= List of Italian films of 1957 =

A list of films produced in Italy in 1957 (see 1957 in film):

Italian films released in 1957
Title	Director	Cast	Genre	Notes
20 Million Miles to Earth	Nathan H. Juran	William Hopper, Joan Taylor, Frank Puglia	Science fiction	American/Italian-West-German co-production
A sud niente di nuovo	Giorgio Simonelli	Corrado Anncelli, Pier Ugo Gragnani	Musical comedy	
A vent'anni è sempre festa	Vittorio Duse	Luisa Rivelli, Memmo Carotenuto		
The Adventures of Arsène Lupin	Jacques Becker	Robert Lamoureux, Liselotte Pulver	Crime	
All'insegna delle sorelle Kadar				
Amanti senza peccato				
Amarti è il mio destino	Ferdinando Baldi	Ferdinando Baldi, Narciso Parigi		
An Eye for an Eye	André Cayatte	Curd Jürgens, Folco Lulli, Lea Padovani	Thriller	Co-production with France
Ángeles sin cielo	Sergio Corbucci; Carlos Arevalo	Lidia San Clemente, Elías Rodríguez	Drama	
Anyone Can Kill Me	Henri Decoin	François Périer, Peter van Eyck, Anouk Aimée	Crime	Co-production with France
Archipelago di fuoco	Marcello Andrei		Documentary	
Arrivano i dollari!	Mario Costa	Alberto Sordi, Nino Taranto	Comedy	
Ascoltami	Carlo Campogalliani	Luciano Tajoli, Joachim Fuchsberger	Musical comedy	
Belle ma povere	Dino Risi	Marisa Allasio, Maurizio Arena	Comedy	
Beneath the Palms on the Blue Sea	Hans Deppe	Bibi Johns, Giulia Rubini	Musical	German/Italian co-production
A Bomb for a Dictator	Alex Joffé	Pierre Fresnay, Michel Auclair	Thriller	French–Italian co-production
Buongiorno primo amore!	Marino Girolami	Claudio Villa, Fulvia Franco		
Burning Fuse	Henri Decoin	Raymond Pellegrin, Charles Vanel, Françoise Fabian	Thriller	French/Italian co-production
C'è un sentiero nel cielo	Marino Girolami	Claudio Villa, Ivana Kislinger		
Campi sperimentali				
Camping				
Casino de Paris	André Hunebelle	Gilbert Bécaud, Caterina Valente	Musical comedy	
Desert Warrior	Goffredo Alessandrini; Fernando Cerchio; León Klimovsky	Carmen Sevilla, Ricardo Montalbán	Adventure	Italian/Spanish co-production
Dimentica il mio passato	Eduardo Manzanos; Primo Zeglio	Maria Luiz Galicia, Ettore Manni	Romance	
Dinanzi a noi il cielo	Roberto Savarese	Lorella De Luca, Enzo Doria		
Dishonorable Discharge	Bernard Borderie	Eddie Constantine, Lino Ventura		
El maestro	Aldo Fabrizi; Eduardo Manzanos	Aldo Fabrizi, Edoardo Nevola	Drama	
Engaged to Death	Romolo Marcellini	Rik Battaglia, Sylva Koscina	Sports drama	
Fathers and Sons	Mario Monicelli	Vittorio De Sica, Lorella De Luca	Comedy	
Femmine tre volte	Steno	Sylva Koscina, Alberto Bonucci		
Fibre en civiltà				
Gates of Paris	René Clair	Pierre Brasseur, Georges Brassens	Drama	French/Italian co-production
Gente felice	Mino Loy	Renato Chiantoni, Riccardo Billi	Comedy	
Gente lontana				
Giocare				
Guendalina	Alberto Lattuada	Jacqueline Sassard, Raf Vallone, Sylva Koscina	—N/a	Italian–French co-production
Hänsel e Gretel				
He Who Must Die	Jules Dassin	Jean Servais, Carl Möhner, Grégoire Aslan	Drama	French–Italian co-production
Ho amato una diva	Luigi Latini Di Marchi	Riccardo Billi, Eloisa Cianni	Comedy	
I colpevoli	Turi Vasile	Isa Miranda, Carlo Ninchi	Comedy	
I dritti	Mario Amendola	Ferruccio Amendola, Valeria Moriconi	Comedy	
I gioiellieri del chiaro di luna				
I misteri di Parigi	Fernando Cerchio	Frank Villard, Lorella De Luca		
I sogni nel cassetto	Renato Castellani	Lea Massari, Enrico Pagani	Romance	
I Vampiri	Riccardo Freda, Mario Bava	Gianna Maria Canale, Carlo D'Angelo, Dario Michaelis	Horror	
Il cielo brucia	Giuseppe Masini	Amedeo Nazzari, Antonella Lualdi	War drama	
Il cocco di mamma	Mauro Morassi	Carlo Pedersoli, Franca Rame		
Il Conte di Matera	Luigi Capuano	Virna Lisi, Otello Toso	Adventure	
Il conte Max	Giorgio Bianchi	Alberto Sordi, Vittorio De Sica	Comedy	Italian–Spanish co-production
Il corsaro della mezzaluna	Giuseppe Maria Scotese	John Derek, Gianna Maria Canale	Adventure	
Il diavolo nero	Sergio Grieco	Gérard Landry, Milly Vitale	Adventure	
Il Grido	Michelangelo Antonioni	Steve Cochran, Alida Valli, Dorian Gray	Drama	
Il medico e lo stregone	Mario Monicelli	Vittorio De Sica, Marcello Mastroianni	Comedy	
Il momento più bello	Luciano Emmer	Marcello Mastroianni, Giovanna Ralli	Drama	
Il pupo dal k.o.	Paolo Saglietto	Giuseppe Aicardi, Beppa Lanfredi		
Il ricatto di un padre	Giuseppe Vari	Eduardo Ciannelli, Janet Vidor	Drama	
Il segreto della Sierra Dorada	Pino Belli		Documentary	
Il sole tornerà	Ferdinando Merighi	Bianca Maria Ferrari, Luisa Rivelli		
Il tiranno del Garda	Ignazio Ferronetti	Irene Genna, Virginia Belmont		
Italia piccola	Mario Soldati	Nino Taranto, Erminio Macario		
L'amore più bello	Glauco Pellegrini	Edoardo Nevola, Eduardo De Filippo	Comedy drama	
L'amore è in gioco				
L'angelo custode	Giuliano Tomei	Paolo Fischnaller, Irma Pichler		
L'angelo delle Alpi	Carlo Campogalliani	Luisella Boni, Alberto Farnese	Melodrama	
L'avaro	Vittorio Cottafavi	Edda Albertini, Warner Bentivegna	Comedy	
L'ex alunno				
L'isola di smeraldo				
L'oceano ci chiama	Giovanni Roccardi		Documentary	
L'ultima violenza	Raffaello Matarazzo	Yvonne Sanson, Lorella De Luca	Drama	
La canzone del destino	Marino Girolami	Claudio Villa, Milly Vitale		
La canzone più bella	Ottorino Franco Bertolini	Jula De Palma, Wandisa Guida		
La cenicienta y Ernesto	Pedro Luis Ramirez	Antonella Lualdi, Antonio Garisa	Comedy	
La chiamavan Capinera...	Piero Regnoli	Irène Galter	Drama	
La donna che venne dal mare	Francesco De Robertis	Sandra Milo, Vittorio De Sica	Thriller	
La finestra sul Luna Park	Luigi Comencini	Giulia Rubini, Pierre Trabaud	Drama	
La grande caccia		Marshall Thompson	Adventure	
La grande ombra	Claudio Gora	Scilla Vannucci, Mara Berni	Drama	
La grande strada azzurra	Gillo Pontecorvo	Alida Valli, Yves Montand	Romance	
La lunga raccolta				
La nonna Sabella	Dino Risi	Tina Pica, Peppino De Filippo	Comedy	
La puerta abierta	César Fernández Ardavín	Amedeo Nazzari, Märta Torén	Crime drama	
La ragazza della salina	František Čáp	Marcello Mastroianni, Isabelle Corey	Comedy	
La regina della povera gente	Pedro Ramirez	Franco Interlenghi, Antonella Lualdi	Adventure	
La spada imbattibile	Hugo Fregonese	Paul Campbell, Peter Trent		
La strega				
La trovatella di Pompei	Giacomo Gentilomo	Alessandra Panaro, Massimo Girotti	Melodrama	
La verde età				
La zia d'America va a sciare	Roberto Bianchi Montero	Tina Pica, Franca Rame	Comedy	
Las manos sucias	Jose Antonio de la Loma	Amedeo Nazzari, Lidia Alfonsi	Drama	
Lazzarella	Carlo Ludovico Bragaglia	Alessandra Panaro, Mario Girotti	Comedy	
Le avventure dei tre moschettieri	Joseph Lerner	Paul Campbell, Domenico Madugno	Opera	
Le avventure di Robi e Buck	Gennaro De Dominicis	Cristoforo Meynier, Beatrice Pini		
Le belle dell'aria	Mario Costa	Gino Cervi, José Calvo	Comedy	
Le meraviglie delle Alpi				
Le notti bianche	Luchino Visconti	Maria Schell, Marcello Mastroianni	Neo-realist	
Le notti di Cabiria	Federico Fellini	Giulietta Masina, Ennio Flaiano	Drama	Academy Award for Best Foreign Language Film
Le schiave di Cartagine	Guido Brignone	Gianna Maria Canale, Jorge Mistral		Italian/Spanish co-production
Legend of the Lost	Henry Hathaway	John Wayne, Sophia Loren	Adventure	American/Italian co-production
Les espions	Henri-Georges Clouzot	Peter Ustinov, Curd Jürgens	Drama	French/Italian co-production
Liane, die weiße Sklavin	Hermann Leitner, Gino Talamo	Adrian Hoven, Marion Michael	—N/a	West German–Italian co-production
Lovers of Paris	Julien Duvivier	Gérard Philipe, Danielle Darrieux		
Malafemma				
The Man in the Raincoat	Julien Duvivier	Fernandel, Bernard Blier	Comedy	French/Italian co-production
Marisa	Mauro Bolognini	Marisa Allasio, Renato Salvatori Francisco Rabal	—N/a	Italian–Spanish co-production
Marisa la civetta	Mauro Bolognini	Ettore Manni, Francisco Rabal	Comedy	
Mariti in città	Luigi Comencini	Nino Taranto, Franco Fabrizi	Comedy	
Mattino di primavera	Giacinto Solito	Anna Amendola, Nino Besozzi	Comedy	
Miracles of Thursday	Luis García Berlanga	Richard Basehart, Paolo Stoppa	Comedy	Spanish/Italian co-production
The Monte Carlo Story	Samuel Taylor	Marlene Dietrich, Vittorio De Sica	Comedy drama	American/Italian co-production
Nathalie	Christian-Jaque	Martine Carol, Mischa Auer, Michel Piccoli	Comedy	Co-production with France
Nights of Cabiria	Federico Fellini	Giulietta Masina, François Périer, Franco Fabrizi	Drama	Italian–French co-production
No Sun in Venice	Roger Vadim	Françoise Arnoul, Christian Marquand	Drama	French/Italian co-production
Noi dell'oceano				
Non cantare...baciami	Giorgio Simonelli	Fiorella Mari, Nunzio Gallo		
Non Sono Piu Guaglione	Domenico Paolella	Sylva Koscina, Gabriele Tinti		French–Italian co-production
On Foot, on Horse, and on Wheels	Maurice Delbez	Noël-Noël, Denise Grey	Comedy	Co-production with France
Onore e sangue	Luigi Capuano	Carlo Giuffrè, Otello Toso	Drama	
Orizzonte infuocato	Roberto Bianchi Montero	Guido Celano, Gérard Landry	Drama	
Padri e figli	Mario Monicelli	Vittorio De Sica, Lorella De Luca	Comedy	
Parola di ladro	Gianni Puccini, Nanni Loy	Gabriele Ferzetti, Abbe Lane	Comedy	
Paul Gauguin				
Peppino, le modelle e chella là	Mario Mattoli	Gino Bramieri, Peppino De Filippo	Comedy	
Poveri ma belli	Dino Risi	Marisa Allasio, Maurizio Arena	Comedy	
Presentimento				
Primo applause	Pino Mercanti	Carlo Dapporto, Claudio Villa		
Questo nostro mondo				
Ragazzi della marina	Francesco De Robertis		Documentary	
Rascel-Fifì	Guido Leone	Renato Rascel, Annie Fratellini	Crime comedy	
Retour de manivelle	Denys de La Patellière	Michèle Morgan, Daniel Gélin	Crime drama	
Ritmi di New York				
S.O.S. Noronha	Georges Rouquier	Jean Marais, Daniel Ivernel	Adventure	French/Italian/West German co-production
Saranno uomini	Dilvio Siano	Massimo Girotti, Aldo Silvani	Drama	
Segno della croce				
Send a Woman When the Devil Fails	Yves Allégret	Edwige Feuillère, Jean Servais		French/Italian co-production
Sénéchal le magnifique	Jean Boyer	Fernandel, Nadia Gray	Comedy	French/Italian co-production
Serenata a Maria	Luigi Capuano	Maria Fiore, Sergio Bruni	Melodrama	
Sette piccole croci				
Sette pittori				
Sigfrido	Giacomo Gentilomo	Sebastian Fischer, Katharina Mayberg	Adventure	
Solo Dio mi fermerà				
Sotto la croce del sud				
Souvenir d'Italie	Antonio Pietrangeli	Gabriele Ferzetti, Isabelle Corey		
Suor Letizia	Mario Camerini	Anna Magnani, Eleonora Rossi Drago	Comedy drama	
Susanna tutta panna	Steno	Marisa Allasio, Germán Cobos	Romantic comedy	
Te sto' aspettanno				
Terra mare cielo				
Totò, Vittorio e la dottoressa				
Traguardi di gloria				
Trapped in Tangiers	Riccardo Freda	Edmund Purdom, Geneviève Page, Gino Cervi	—N/a	Italian–Spanish co-production
Un angelo è sceso a Brooklyn				
Une parisienne				
Until the Last One	Pierre Billon	Raymond Pellegrin, Jeanne Moreau, Paul Meurisse	Thriller	Co-production with France
Vacanze a Ischia				
Vecchio cinema... che passione!				
Via Belgarbo				
Viaggio nella valle del Po alla ricerca di cibi genuini				
Vivendo, cantando che male ti fo?				
White Nights	Luchino Visconti	Maria Schell, Marcello Mastroianni, Jean Marais	Drama, romance	
Whom God Forgives	José María Forqué	Francisco Rabal, Luis Peña	Action	Spanish/Italian co-production
The Window to Luna Park	Luigi Comencini	Giulia Rubini, Gastone Renzelli	Drama	
