= Giovani e belli =

- Directed by: Dino Risi
- Written by: Dino Risi; Bernardino Zapponi
- Produced by: Giovanni Bertolucci
- Starring: Anna Falchi; Luca Venantini; Edoardo Scatà; Carlo Croccolo; Ciccio Ingrassia
- Cinematography: Maurizio Calvesi
- Edited by: Alberto Gallitti
- Music by: Armando Trovajoli
- Release date: 1996
- Running time: 90 min
- Country: Italy
- Language: Italian

Giovani e belli is a 1996 Italian comedy film directed by Dino Risi at his last film. It is loosely based on Poveri ma belli, directed by the same Risi in 1957.

== Plot ==
Gino and Luke are two Roman boys: one's rich, the other is a proletarian. Both the two are in love for a gypsy named Zorilla. But the two young men have to deal with the leader of the band of gypsies where lives Zorilla, who is not willing to entrust the girl with two young men. When Zorilla gets the consent of the boss, she goes to live with Luke and Gino, creating havoc in their families.

== Cast ==
- Anna Falchi: Zorilla
- Luca Venantini: Gino
- Edoardo Scatà: Luca
- Ciccio Ingrassia: King of the Gipsies
- Carlo Croccolo: Bonafoni
- Venantino Venantini: Buby
- Carla Cassola: Mother of Luca
- Gina Rovere: "Astoria" owner
