= Rossella Como =

Italian actress (1939–1986)

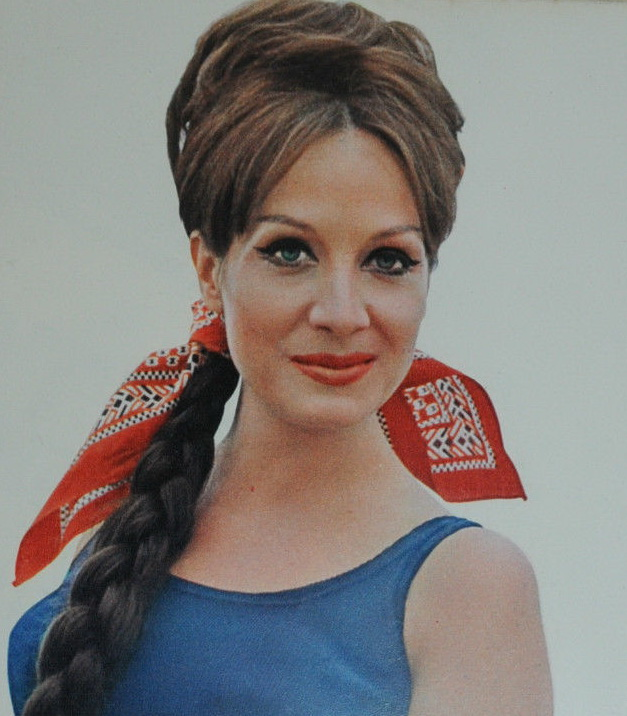
- Born: 29 January 1939; Rome, Kingdom of Italy
- Died: 20 December 1986 (aged 47); Rome, Italy
- Occupation: Actress

Rossella Como (29 January 1939 – 20 December 1986) was an Italian actress and television personality.

== Life and career ==
Born in Rome, Rossella Como started her career at just 16 years old as a TV presenter, in the RAI show Primo applauso. Shortly later she made her film debut in a little but critically appreciated role in the Dino Risi's comedy film Poor, But Handsome.

From then Como appeared with some frequency both as an actress and as a presenter in films and on television, as well as on stage. In 1973 she was author and main actress of Roma Amor, a successful stage musical where she alternated Roman folk songs to sonnets of Pier Paolo Pasolini and Trilussa and with which she long toured in Italy and Latin America.

Rossella Como died of cancer.

== Partial filmography ==
- Roland the Mighty (1956) - Dolores
- Poor, But Handsome (1957) - Jole
- Oh! Sabella (1957) - Evelina Mancuso
- Seven Hills of Rome (1957) - Anita
- Lazzarella (1957) - Fanny
- Io, mammeta e tu (1958) - Carmelina, la figlia
- Legs of Gold (1958) - Carla Fontana
- Elena (uncredited)
- L'amore nasce a Roma (1958) - Doretta
- Carmela è una bambola (1958) - Doretta
- Caporale di giornata (1958) - Margherita
- Marinai, donne e guai (1958) - Juanita, la fotografa
- Perfide.... ma belle (1959) - Angela Antonia Garofalo
- The Loves of Hercules (1960) - Aleia
- Pesci d'oro e bikini d'argento (1961)
- Cacciatori di dote (1961) - Nella, Chambermaid
- Che femmina!! E... che dollari! (1961)
- Nerone '71 (1962)
- Il sangue e la sfida (1962)
- 2 samurai per 100 geishe (1962)
- 8½ (1963) - Un'amica di Luisa
- Toto vs. the Four (1963) - Moglie di Lancetti
- The Magnificent Adventurer (1963) - Angela
- La pupa (1963)
- Scanzonatissimo (1963)
- The Shortest Day (1963) - Infermiera (uncredited)
- I due toreri (1964) - Dolores
- Canzoni, bulli e pupe (1964)
- Seven Vengeful Women (1966) - Katy Grimaldi
- The Million Dollar Countdown (1967) - Claudine
- I Married You for Fun (1967) - Ginestra
- How to Kill 400 Duponts (1967) - Barbara Le Duc, la moglie
- Ragan (1968) - Maria
- Franco, Ciccio e le vedove allegre (1968) - Mara
- It's Your Move (1968) - Mme Guinet
- Il sole è di tutti (1968) - Gianna
- I giardini del diavolo (1971) - Liesel
- Trastevere (1971) - Teresa
- Il sergente Klems (1971) - Miss Schinn, the Reporter
- The Best (1976) - Signora Chiocchietti
- Vacanze di Natale (1983) - Signora Covelli
- Christmas Present (1986) - (uncredited) (final film role)
