= Tonino Delli Colli =

Italian cinematographer

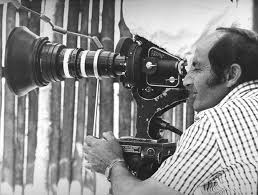
- Delli Colli in the 1960s
- Born: 20 November 1923; Rome, Kingdom of Italy
- Died: 16 August 2005 (aged 81); Rome, Italy
- Years active: 1940–1997
- Relatives: Franco Delli Colli (cousin)

Antonio "Tonino" Delli Colli (20 November 1923 – 16 August 2005) was an Italian cinematographer.

== Life and career ==
Born in Rome, Delli Colli began work at the Cinecittà studio at the age of sixteen.

By the mid-1940s he was working as a cinematographer and shot the first Italian film in colour, Totò a colori. He went on to work with a number of acclaimed and diverse directors including, Sergio Leone, Roman Polanski, Louis Malle, Jean-Jacques Annaud, and Federico Fellini, but it was his collaboration with Pier Paolo Pasolini that proved to be the most fruitful, making together a total of 12 films.

Although Delli Colli did not work regularly with Lina Wertmuller, his cinematography for Seven Beauties (1975) was a major career highlight.

=== Death ===
In 2005 he was awarded the American Society of Cinematographers' International Achievement Award.

In August of the same year, he died from a heart attack at the age of 81 in his home in Rome.

In the same year, Delli Colli was posthumously awarded the Lifetime Achievement Award at the 13th annual Camerimage Film Festival in Łódź, Poland.

== Filmography ==
=== Film ===
Year	Title	Director	Notes
1944	Finalmente sì	Ladislao Kish	
1946	O sole mio	Giacomo Gentilomo	With Anchise Brizzi
1946	Il paese senza pace	Leo Menardi; Carlo Lodovici	
1946	Felicità perduta	Filippo Walter Ratti	With Romolo Garroni
1946	Trepidazione	Toni Frenguelli	
1947	Nada	Edgar Neville	Uncredited
1948	L'isola di Montecristo	Mario Sequi	
1949	City of Pain	Mario Bonnard	
1949	A Night of Fame	Mario Monicelli; Steno	With Leonida Barboni
1949	Hand of Death	Carlo Campogalliani	
1950	Fugitive Lady	Marino Girolami; Sidney Salkow	
1950	Alina	Giorgio Pastina	
1950	The Vow	Mario Bonnard	
1951	The Rival of the Empress	Jacopo Comin; Sidney Salkow	With Erwin Hillier
1951	I'm the Capataz	Giorgio Simonelli	
1951	Milano miliardaria	Marino Girolami; Marcello Marchesi; Vittorio Metz	
1951	Accidents to the Taxes!!	Mario Mattoli	
1951	Toto the Third Man	Mario Mattoli	
1951	Era lui... sì! sì!	Marino Girolami; Marcello Marchesi; Vittorio Metz	With Vincenzo Seratrice
1951	The Steamship Owner	Mario Mattoli	
1952	Toto in Color	Steno	
1952	The Three Pirates	Mario Soldati	
1952	Toto and the Women	Mario Monicelli; Steno	
1952	Brothers of Italy	Fausto Saraceni	
1953	Jolanda, the Daughter of the Black Corsair	Mario Soldati	
1953	Gioventù alla sbarra	Ferruccio Cerio	
1953	Nero and the Burning of Rome	Primo Zeglio	With Mario Albertelli
1953	The Pagans	Ferruccio Cerio	
1953	I Always Loved You	Mario Costa	
1954	Mid-Century Loves	Glauco Pellegrini; Pietro Germi; Mario Chiari; Roberto Rossellini; Antonio Pietrangeli	
1954	Where Is Freedom?	Roberto Rossellini	With Aldo Tonti
1954	Concert of Intrigue	Mario Bonnard	
1954	The Shadow	Giorgio Bianchi	
1954	Red and Black	Domenico Paolella	
1955	Le signorine dello 04	Gianni Franciolini	
1955	The White Angel	Raffaello Matarazzo	
1955	Accadde al penitenziario	Giorgio Bianchi	
1955	The Letters Page	Steno	
1956	The Intruder	Raffaello Matarazzo	
1956	Donatella	Mario Monicelli	
1956	Una voce, una chitarra, un po' di luna	Giacomo Gentilomo	
1957	Poor, But Handsome	Dino Risi	
1957	Oh! Sabella	Dino Risi	
1957	Susanna Whipped Cream	Steno	With Marco Scarpelli
1957	Femmine tre volte	Steno	
1957	Seven Hills of Rome	Roy Rowland	
1957	Pretty But Poor	Dino Risi	
1958	Adorabili e bugiarde	Nunzio Malasomma	
1958	Venice, the Moon and You	Dino Risi	
1959	First Love	Mario Camerini	
1959	Marinai, donne e guai	Giorgio Simonelli	With Alejandro Ulloa
1959	The Friend of the Jaguar	Giuseppe Bennati	
1959	Poor Millionaires	Dino Risi	
1959	Le cameriere	Carlo Ludovico Bragaglia	
1960	Morgan the Pirate	Andre de Toth; Primo Zeglio	
1961	The Thief of Baghdad	Arthur Lubin	
1961	Accattone	Pier Paolo Pasolini	
1961	The Wonders of Aladdin	Henry Levin; Mario Bava	
1962	I nuovi angeli	Ugo Gregoretti	
1962	La monaca di Monza	Carmine Gallone	
1962	Mamma Roma	Pier Paolo Pasolini	
1962	Swordsman of Siena	Étienne Périer; Baccio Bandini	
1963	La bella di Lodi	Mario Missiroli	
1963	The Executioner	Luis García Berlanga	
1964	Liolà	Alessandro Blasetti	With Leonida Barboni and Carlo Di Palma
1964	The Gospel According to St. Matthew	Pier Paolo Pasolini	
1965	The Camp Followers	Valerio Zurlini	
1965	The Mandrake	Alberto Lattuada	
1966	The Hawks and the Sparrows	Pier Paolo Pasolini	With Mario Bernardo
1966	The Sultans	Jean Delannoy	
1966	Andremo in città	Nelo Risi	
1966	Target for Killing	Manfred R. Köhler	With Siegfried Hold
1966	The Good, the Bad and the Ugly	Sergio Leone	
1967	China Is Near	Marco Bellocchio	
1967	Ghosts – Italian Style	Renato Castellani	
1968	The Day of the Owl	Damiano Damiani	
1968	OSS 117 – Double Agent	Jean-Pierre Desagnat; Renzo Cerrato; André Hunebelle	
1968	Once Upon a Time in the West	Sergio Leone	
1969	Metti, una sera a cena	Giuseppe Patroni Griffi	
1969	Pigsty	Pier Paolo Pasolini	With Armando Nannuzzi and Giuseppe Ruzzolini
1970	Rosolino Paternò, soldato...	Nanni Loy	With Riccardo Pallottini
1970	Pussycat, Pussycat, I Love You	Rod Amateau	
1971	The Decameron	Pier Paolo Pasolini	
1971	Man of the Year	Marco Vicario	
1971	Come Together	Saul Swimmer	
1972	Pilgrimage	Beni Montresor	
1972	The Canterbury Tales	Pier Paolo Pasolini	
1972	The Master Touch	Michele Lupo	
1973	Deaf Smith & Johnny Ears	Paolo Cavara	
1973	Bawdy Tales	Sergio Citti	
1973	The Sensual Man	Marco Vicario	
1974	Lovers and Other Relatives	Salvatore Samperi	
1974	Lacombe, Lucien	Louis Malle	
1974	Till Marriage Do Us Part	Luigi Comencini	
1975	Salò, or the 120 Days of Sodom	Pier Paolo Pasolini	
1975	Seven Beauties	Lina Wertmüller	
1976	Caro Michele	Mario Monicelli	
1977	The Forbidden Room	Dino Risi	
1977	The Purple Taxi	Yves Boisset	
1977	Beach House	Sergio Citti	
1977	I nuovi mostri	Dino Risi; Ettore Scola; Mario Monicelli	
1978	First Love	Dino Risi	
1978	Blood Feud	Lina Wertmüller	
1979	Lovers and Liars	Mario Monicelli	
1979	Dear Father	Dino Risi	
1980	Hurricane Rosy	Mario Monicelli	
1980	I'm Photogenic	Dino Risi	
1981	Camera d'albergo	Mario Monicelli	
1981	Fantasma d'amore	Dino Risi	
1981	Tales of Ordinary Madness	Marco Ferreri	
1983	Trenchcoat	Michael Tuchner	
1984	Once Upon a Time in America	Sergio Leone	
1984	The Future Is Woman	Marco Ferreri	
1984	Notti e nebbie	Marco Tullio Giordana	TV movie
1986	Ginger and Fred	Federico Fellini	With Ennio Guarnieri
1986	The Name of the Rose	Jean-Jacques Annaud	
1987	Intervista	Federico Fellini	
1988	Stradivari	Giacomo Battiato	
1990	The Voice of the Moon	Federico Fellini	
1990	The African Woman	Margarethe von Trotta	
1991	A Simple Story	Emidio Greco	
1992	Bitter Moon	Roman Polanski	
1993	La Soif de l'or	Gérard Oury	
1994	Death and the Maiden	Roman Polanski	
1995	Facciamo paradiso	Mario Monicelli	
1997	Marianna Ucrìa	Roberto Faenza	
1997	Life Is Beautiful	Roberto Benigni	

Short film

Year	Title	Director	Notes
1963	La ricotta	Pier Paolo Pasolini	Segment of Ro.Go.Pa.G.
1964	Amore e arte	Gianni Puccini	Segments of Amore in 4 dimensioni
1964	Amore e morte	Mino Guerrini	Segments of Amore in 4 dimensioni
1964	La Feuille de route	Ugo Gregoretti	Segment of The World's Most Beautiful Swindlers
1964	Il generale	Alfredo Giannetti	Segment of Amori pericolosi
1964	La doccia	Massimo Franciosa	Segment of Extraconiugale
1968	Che cosa sono le nuvole?	Pier Paolo Pasolini	Segment of Caprice Italian Style
1968	William Wilson	Louis Malle	Segment of Spirits of the Dead
1980	Armando's Notebook	Dino Risi	Segment of Sunday Lovers
1991	Il cane blu	Giuseppe Bertolucci	Segment of Especially on Sunday
1996	Sanpellegrino Calze	Giuseppe Tornatore	

=== Documentary film ===
Year	Title	Director	Notes
1952	Gli undici moschettieri	Ennio De Concini; Fausto Saraceni	
1957	Questo nostro mondo	Ugo Lazzarini; Eros Macchi; Angelo Negri	With Massimo Dallamano, Paolo Gregori, Alvaro Mancori and Gian Maria Rimoldi
1960	Il mondo di notte	Luigi Vanzi	
1964	Love Meetings	Pier Paolo Pasolini	With Mario Bernardo

Documentary short

Year	Title	Director	Notes
1971	Le mura di Sana	Pier Paolo Pasolini	
1994	Cento di questi anni	Corrado Farina	
2024	Der rabe unheimlich	Erik Mariñelarena	With Boyd Estus

== Awards and nominations ==
Year	Award	Category	Title	Result
1984	BAFTA Awards	Best Cinematography	Once Upon a Time in America	Nominated
2005	American Society of Cinematographers	International Award		Won
2005	Camerimage	Lifetime Achievement Award		Won
1980	David di Donatello	Best Cinematography	Camera d'albergo	Nominated
1981	David di Donatello	Best Cinematography	The Canterbury Tales	Won
1986	David di Donatello	Best Cinematography	Ginger and Fred	Nominated
1987	David di Donatello	Best Cinematography	The Name of the Rose	Won
1988	David di Donatello	Best Cinematography	Intervista	Nominated
1990	David di Donatello	Best Cinematography	The Voice of the Moon	Nominated
1997	David di Donatello	Best Cinematography	Marianna Ucrìa	Won
1998	David di Donatello	Best Cinematography	Life Is Beautiful	Won
