= Gianni Bonagura =

Italian actor (1925–2017)

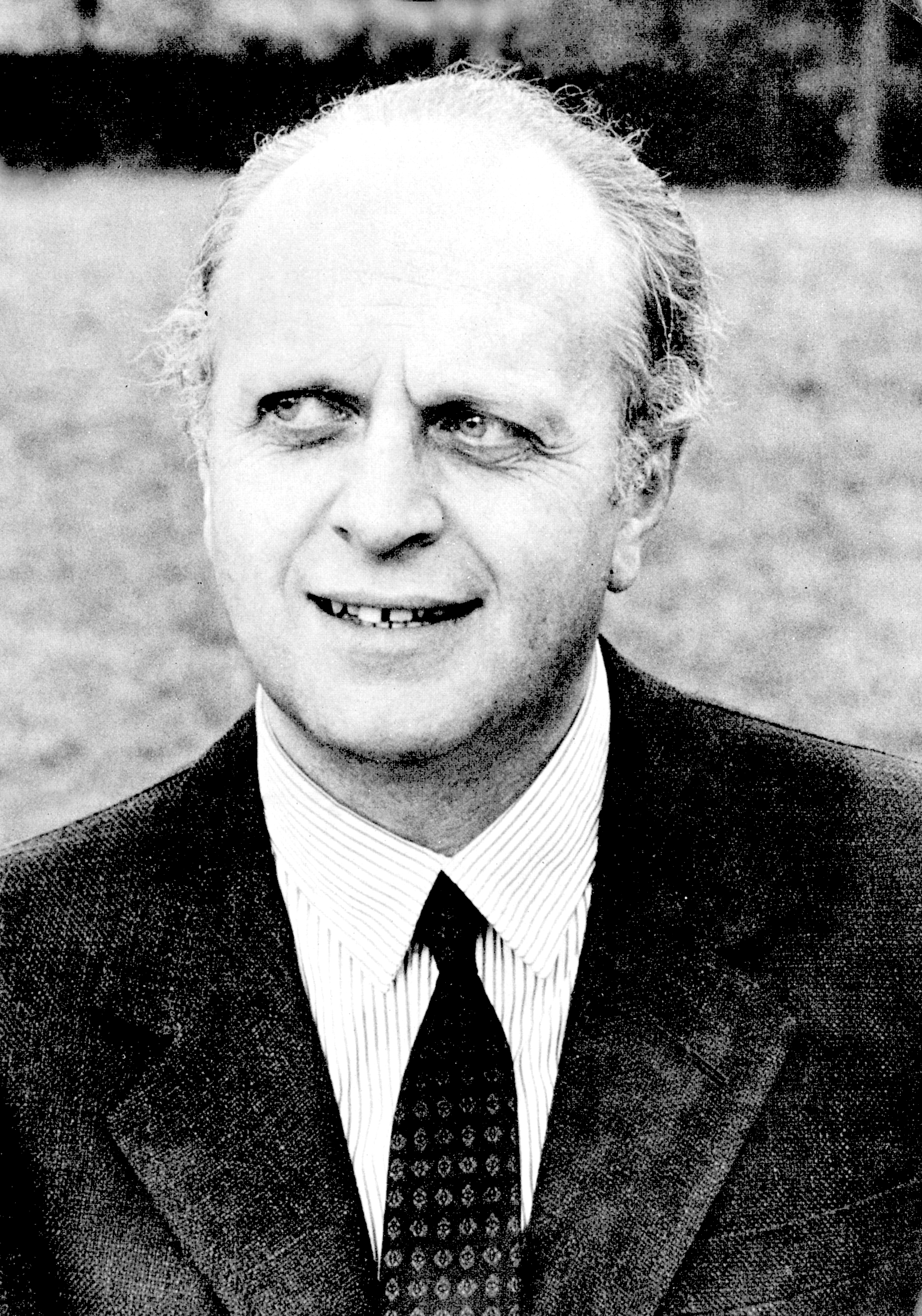
- Bonagura in 1969
- Born: Gianfelice Bonagura; 27 October 1925; Milan, Italy
- Died: 8 October 2017 (aged 91); Milan, Italy
- Occupations: Actor; voice actor
- Years active: 1950–2005

Gianfelice "Gianni" Bonagura (27 October 1925 – 8 October 2017) was an Italian actor and voice actor.

== Life and career ==
Born in Milan, Bonagura was active on film, stage, television and radio. He appeared in 40 films between 1950 and 2001. He arrived at the threshold of a degree in philosophy, then in 1946 he abandoned his studies to attend the Silvio d'Amico National Academy of Dramatic Arts. Essentially a stage actor, Bonagura became popular in the second half of the fifties as a radio actor, protagonist of vignettes together with Nino Manfredi and Paolo Ferrari. In cinema and television, he was only used as a character actor, with the exception of the role of Dr. Watson in the 1968 RAI television series Sherlock Holmes.

Bonagura also worked as a voice actor. He occasionally dubbed over the voices of Danny DeVito, Mel Brooks and Ian Holm for Italian-language versions of foreign films. One of his most popular dubbing roles includes providing the Italian voice of Palpatine's alter ego, Darth Sidious in Star Wars: Episode I – The Phantom Menace. In his animated roles, he dubbed the voices of Uncle Waldo in The Aristocats and Mr. Snoops in The Rescuers.

== Death ==
Bonagura died in Milan on 8 October 2017, 19 days before his 92nd birthday.

== Partial filmography ==
- Against the Law (1950)
- Fugitive in Trieste (1951)
- Susanna Whipped Cream (1957) - Un complice del ladro
- Femmine tre volte (1957) - Cesare, il sindicalista
- Carmela è una bambola (1958) - The Prosecutor
- The Employee (1959) - Amedeo - Totocalcio Accountant
- Audace colpo dei soliti ignoti (1960) - Pippetto aka Father Filippo
- Le signore (1960)
- Le pillole di Ercole (1960) - Un medico al congresso di gerontologia
- The Passionate Thief (1960)
- Behind Closed Doors (1961) - L'avvocato difensore
- Damon and Pythias (1962) - Phylemon
- Le pillole di Ercole (1962) - Cerrocchi
- I cuori infranti (1963) - Filippini (segment "E vissero felici")
- I soldi (1965)
- Marcia nuziale (1966) - Veterinario Coribaldo
- Che notte ragazzi! (1966) - Direttore dell'albergo
- La notte è fatta per... rubare (1967) - Notaio Jacques Gaspard
- Les cracks (1968) - Pifarelli
- Sherlock Holmes (1968, TV Mini-Series) - Dr. Watson
- The Adventures of Pinocchio (1971) - The Coachman (voice)
- In Prison Awaiting Trial (1971) - Avv. Sallustio Giordana
- La Tosca (1973) - Sciarrone
- My Darling Slave (1973) - Balzarini
- The Great Kidnapping (1973) - Il commissario Zenoni
- Il figlioccio del padrino (1973) - RAI-TV General Manager
- Sex Pot (1975) - Receptionist
- Segni particolari: bellissimo (1983) - Professore
- I Am an ESP (1985) - De Angelis
- Grandi magazzini (1986) - Dott. Gruber
- Mia moglie è una bestia (1988) - Professore di scienze naturali
- Tre colonne in cronaca (1990) - Petroni
- In the Name of the Sovereign People (1990) - Pio IX
- Prestazione straordinaria (1994) - Mercantoni
- Ferdinando and Carolina (1999) - Austrian Ambassador
- Padre Pio: Miracle Man (2000, TV Movie) - Padre Benedetto
