= The Shortest Day =

1963 Italian war movie parody

- Directed by: Sergio Corbucci
- Written by: Sandro Continenza; Bruno Corbucci; Giovanni Grimaldi; Giorgio Arlorio
- Produced by: Goffredo Lombardo
- Starring: Ciccio Ingrassia; Franco Franchi; Gino Cervi; Totò; Annie Girardot; Ugo Tognazzi; Eduardo De Filippo; Peppino De Filippo; Aldo Fabrizi; Philippe Leroy; Amedeo Nazzari; Tomas Milian
- Cinematography: Enzo Barboni
- Edited by: Ruggero Mastroianni
- Music by: Piero Piccioni
- Distributed by: Titanus Films
- Release date: 1963
- Running time: 95 minutes
- Country: Italy
- Languages: Italian; English; German; French

The Shortest Day (Italian: Il giorno più corto) is a 1963 Italian comedy film. It is a parody of the war movie The Longest Day and stars the popular duo Franco and Ciccio in the leading roles. Dozens of other well-known actors, from both European and American cinema, agreed to appear in the movie in cameo roles for free to avert the bankruptcy of the production company, Titanus.

== Plot ==
Two Sicilians, Franco and Ciccio, are put before a war tribunal after World War I. Their defense attorney relates the story of how the two men came to be accidentally shipped out to the trenches and how they subsequently found themselves behind enemy lines, mistaken for German soldiers.

== Cast ==
- Gino Cervi
- Totò
- Annie Girardot
- Ugo Tognazzi
- Eduardo De Filippo
- Peppino De Filippo
- Aldo Fabrizi
- Gabriele Ferzetti
- Philippe Leroy
- Amedeo Nazzari
- Tomas Milian
- Romolo Valli
- Renato Salvatori
- Paolo Stoppa
- Walter Chiari
- Franca Valeri
- Anouk Aimée
- Franco Citti
- Sylva Koscina
- Virna Lisi
- Carlo Pisacane
- Giuliano Gemma
- Massimo Girotti
- Mario Girotti
- Franco Fabrizi
- David Niven
- Erminio Macario
- Tiberio Murgia
- Raimondo Vianello
- Memmo Carotenuto
- Nino Castelnuovo
- Luciano Salce
- Nino Taranto
- Aroldo Tieri
- Yvonne Sanson
- Simone Signoret
- Susan Strasberg
- Valentina Cortese
- Lorella De Luca
- Sandra Mondaini
- Ilaria Occhini
- Antonio Acqua
- Ivo Garrani
- Sergio Fantoni
- Paolo Ferrari
- Ángel Aranda
- Fiorenzo Fiorentini
- Paolo Panelli
- Teddy Reno
- Alberto Lupo
- Fausto Tozzi
- Enrico Viarisio
- Pierre Brice
- Aldo Bufi Landi
- Vittorio Caprioli
- Gordon Scott
- Joe Sentieri
- Massimo Serato
- Gabriele Tinti
- Jacques Sernas
- Nino Terzo
- Franco Sportelli
- Luisella Boni
- Lia Zoppelli
- Lilla Brignone
- Rossella Como
- Scilla Gabel
- Cristina Gajoni
- Mark Damon
- Nora Ricci
- Rina Morelli
- Antonella Lualdi
- Frank Latimore
- Franco Giacobini
- Stewart Granger
- Gérard Herter
- Franco Balducci
- Alberto Farnese
- Gianni Garko
- Maurizio Arena
- Giacomo Furia
- Stelvio Rosi
- Umberto Orsini
- Luigi Pavese
- Emilio Pericoli
- Walter Pidgeon
- Steve Reeves
- Roberto Risso
- Mac Ronay
- Folco Lulli
- Piero Lulli
- Ettore Manni
- Rik Battaglia
- Francesco Mulé
- Jean-Paul Belmondo
- Vittorio Gassman
- Aldo Giuffrè
- Renata Mauro
- Sandra Milo
