= Girls of Today =

Girls of Today may refer to:

- Girls of Today (1955 film), an Italian comedy film
- Girls of Today (1933 film), a German comedy film
