= Seven Hills of Rome (film) =

1958 film by Roy Rowland

- Theatrical poster for the USA release
- Directed by: Roy Rowland
- Written by: Art Cohn; Giorgio Prosperi
- Produced by: Lester Welch
- Starring: Mario Lanza; Marisa Allasio; Renato Rascel
- Cinematography: Tonino Delli Colli
- Edited by: Gene Ruggiero
- Music by: Georgie Stoll
- Distributed by: Metro-Goldwyn-Mayer
- Release date: 30 January 1958
- Running time: 107 minutes
- Countries: Italy; United States
- Language: English
- Budget: $908,000
- Box office: $2,155,000

Seven Hills of Rome (Italian title: Arrivederci Roma) is an Italian-American film international co-production released in January 1958 and shot on location in Rome and at the Titanus studios. It was filmed in Technicolor and Technirama, distributed by Metro-Goldwyn-Mayer, was tenor Mario Lanza's penultimate film, and Marisa Allasio’s last film.

== Plot ==
Marc Revere, an American TV singer of Italian heritage, travels to Italy in search of his jet-setting fiancée, Carol Ralston. Revere moves in with his comical and good hearted cousin Pepe Bonelli, a struggling artist who also befriends a beautiful young girl, Raffaella Marini, whom Revere had met on a train, and who develops a crush on him.

Revere, after some difficulty, lands a contract to sing in a fine nightclub, but misses his opening night due to unforeseen circumstances during a date with Carol. When Marc comes to the club later on to apologize, Carol's male escort insults him and the result is a fistfight that damages a good portion of the club. A judge orders Marc to sing there for free until he has attracted enough business to pay for the damages.

This turns out to be a blessing in disguise, as Marc eventually decides Rafaella is his true love and that he will remain in Italy with her.

== Cast ==
- Mario Lanza as Marc Revere
- Marisa Allasio as Raffaella Marini
- Renato Rascel as Pepe Bonelli
- Anna Maria Saritelli as Extra
- Peggie Castle as Carol Ralston
- Clelia Matania as Beatrice
- Carlo Rizzo as Club Ulpia Director
- Rossella Como as Anita
- Guido Celano as Luigi
- Carlo Giuffrè as Franco Cellis
- Marco Tulli as Romoletto
- Paddy Crean as Mr. Fante

== Music ==
The music was supervised and conducted by George Stoll, and included the following songs:

- "The Seven Hills of Rome" – music by Victor Young, lyrics Harold Adamson
- "Arrivederci Roma" – Renato Rascel
- "Calypso Italiano" – George Stoll
- "Vogliamoci tanto bene" – music Renato Rascel, lyrics Roger Berthier
- "Come Dance With Me" – music Richard Leibert, lyrics George Blake
- Imitation Medley (see below)
- "Cielito Lindo" – music by Quirino Mendoza y Cortes (1859–1957)
- "Loveliest Night of the Year" – just a stanza from Lanza's hit song

Among the selections that Lanza sings in this film is "Arrivederci Roma", performed in the Piazza Navona (and recorded) with a young street urchin, Luisa Di Meo. In typical Lanza fashion, the star had encountered the youngster while in Rome and insisted on her appearing in the film. Lanza also performs a sequence of imitations of famous singers of the era — Perry Como, Frankie Laine, Dean Martin, and Louis Armstrong ("When the Saints Go Marching In") — committing to film what was one of his favorite party performances. Opera selections include "Questa o quella" from Rigoletto.

== Production ==
The film was directed by Roy Rowland and was the first of only four films produced by Lester Welch. The screenplay was the last written by Art Cohn, who died two months after the film's release in the same airplane crash that killed famed producer Mike Todd, whose biography Cohn was writing at the time. Cohn partnered with Giorgio Prosperi on the script for the Lanza film, which was based on a story by Giuseppe Amato. The Italian title, Arrivederci Roma, was meant to be the American title of a film Lanza was scheduled to make in 1960, until he died in Rome in October 1959.

== Reception ==
The film performed well at the box office. According to MGM records it earned $680,000 in the US and Canada and $1,275,000 in other countries, resulting in a profit of $162,000 for MGM.

== Awards ==
Seven Hills of Rome was nominated for a Laurel Award (1959) from Motion Picture Exhibitor magazine.

== Sources ==
- Cesari, Armando. Mario Lanza: An American Tragedy (Fort Worth: Baskerville, 2004)
- Notes accompanying the 1990 video release of the film

== See also ==
- List of American films of 1957
