= First Love (1978 film) =

Film by Dino Risi

- Theatrical release poster
- Italian: Primo amore
- Directed by: Dino Risi
- Written by: Ruggero Maccari; Dino Risi
- Produced by: Pio Angeletti; Adriano De Micheli
- Starring: Ugo Tognazzi; Ornella Muti; Mario Del Monaco
- Cinematography: Tonino Delli Colli
- Edited by: Alberto Gallitti
- Music by: Riz Ortolani
- Production company: Dean Film
- Distributed by: United Artists Europa
- Release date: 8 September 1978 (Italy)
- Running time: 115 minutes
- Country: Italy
- Language: Italian

First Love (Italian: Primo amore) is a 1978 Italian comedy-drama film co-written and directed by Dino Risi. For her performance, Ornella Muti won a Grolla d'oro for Best Actress.

== Plot ==
Picchio, a former variety artist, moves into Villa Serena, a retirement home for entertainers in San Pellegrino Terme, where he reunites with several old friends. He also meets a beautiful young servant named Renata, who initially rejects his advances. When he receives a large severance cheque, she agrees to run away with him to Rome, where he promises to launch her into show business, while seeking to revitalise his own career.

Upon arrival in Rome, the two check into the bridal suite of a luxurious hotel. In the morning, Picchio and Renata meet with an old agent friend of his, who explains that live variety shows are no longer popular. She spends the next night in a disco with a male friend who picked her up in the hotel, upsetting Picchio. Following a romantic trip to Capri, the two visit Picchio's estranged son, an inarticulate struggling painter who is in a relationship with a woman who openly despises him. With Picchio unable to find work, he and Renata move into a cheap hotel frequented by prostitutes.

Looking for a job, Picchio takes Renata to a private television station where Emilio, an old colleague, works. Emilio ignores Picchio but is immediately interested in Renata, taking her to another room for an interview. When she does not return, Picchio goes in search and finds the pair having sex in a wardrobe room. Dragging her out and beating her in the street, he is hit in return by a bystander and collapses unconscious. After being hospitalised for some time, he is released with partial amnesia. Outside the TV studio, Picchio runs into Renata, who now hosts her own TV show. The two have coffee together, and she reveals she is having an affair with Emilio. She slips him some money before Emilio picks her up. All hope of love and fame gone, Picchio takes a train back to Villa Serena.

== Cast ==
- Ugo Tognazzi as Ugo Cremonesi a.k.a. Picchio
- Ornella Muti as Renata Mazzetti
- Mario Del Monaco as the director
- Caterina Boratto as Lucy
- Riccardo Billi as Augustarello
- Venantino Venantini as Emilio
- Vittorio Zarfati as the bald boarder
- Marina Lothan Fraiese as the Polish wife
- Enzo Maggio as Trottolino

== See also ==
- List of Italian films of 1978
