= Sherlock Holmes (1968 TV series) =

1968 Italian television series

Sherlock Holmes is an Italian 1968 television series featuring Nando Gazzolo as Sherlock Holmes and Gianni Bonagura as Dr. Watson.

The series aired on Secondo Programma from 25 October to 29 November 1968 and is formed by six episodes: the first three episodes adapt The Valley of Fear while the last three episodes adapt The Hound of the Baskervilles. Each episode is about one hour long.

== Episodes ==
nº	Title	Broadcast date
1	La valle della paura	25 October 1968
2	La valle della paura	1 November 1968
3	La valle della paura	8 November 1968
4	L'ultimo dei Baskerville	15 November 1968
5	L'ultimo dei Baskerville	22 November 1968
6	L'ultimo dei Baskerville	29 November 1968
