= Il figlioccio del padrino =

1973 film

- Directed by: Mariano Laurenti
- Cinematography: Clemente Santoni
- Music by: Carlo Rustichelli
- Release date: 1973
- Country: Italy
- Language: Italian

Il figlioccio del padrino (The Godson of the Godfather) is a 1973 Italian comedy film directed by Mariano Laurenti. A parody of the 1972 film The Godfather, it was mainly shot in Acireale. The film was a commercial success, grossing about ₤500 million (1972) (US$857,300.5) lire.

== Cast ==
- Franco Franchi as Oronzo Musumeci
- Saro Urzì as Don Salvatore Trizzino
- Laura Belli as Apollonia Trizzino
- Carla Romanelli as Onesta Trizzino
- Maurizio Arena as Don Vincenzo Russo
- Riccardo Garrone as Petruzzo
- Tiberio Murgia as Tanuzzo
- Salvatore Puntillo as Michele
- Nunzio Gallo as Himself
- Gianni Bonagura as RAI General Manager
