= Venice, the Moon and You =

1958 film by Dino Risi

- Theatrical release poster
- Italian: Venezia, la luna e tu
- Directed by: Dino Risi
- Written by: Pasquale Festa Campanile; Massimo Franciosa; Dino Risi
- Produced by: Silvio Clementelli
- Starring: Alberto Sordi; Marisa Allasio; Inge Schoener; Niki Dantine; Nino Manfredi
- Cinematography: Tonino Delli Colli
- Edited by: Mario Serandrei
- Music by: Lelio Luttazzi
- Production companies: Titanus; S.G.C.
- Distributed by: Titanus (Italy); Pathé Consortium Cinéma (France)
- Release dates: 3 October 1958 (Italy); 26 August 1959 (France)
- Countries: Italy; France
- Language: Italian

Venice, the Moon and You (Italian: Venezia, la luna e tu) is a 1958 romantic comedy film co-written and directed by Dino Risi and starring Alberto Sordi, Marisa Allasio, Ingeborg Schöner, Niki Dantine and Nino Manfredi. The film follows a womanizing Venetian gondolier who, despite loving his fiancée, becomes entangled with a pair of beautiful American tourists.

== Plot ==
Bepi, a charismatic and womanizing gondolier on the Grand Canal in Venice, is engaged to the jealous Nina. Every time Bepi and Nina argue over his infidelities, she threatens to leave him and instead marry the wealthier Toni, a motorboat driver and her longtime admirer. Bepi has promised Nina that he would only take elderly women on his gondola, but due to a misunderstanding, he ends up taking two beautiful young American tourists, Nathalie and Janet, on board who are staying in Venice for one day.

Nathalie longs for romance and is instantly smitten with Bepi, unaware of his engagement to Nina, while Janet is cynical about love. Unbeknownst to Nina, Bepi takes Nathalie and Janet to a party on their last night in Venice. He later takes them back to their hotel on his gondola, and as Bepi helps an intoxicated Nathalie to bed, she tries to kiss him before they are interrupted by Janet. On the balcony, Janet gives in to Bepi's advances and kisses him despite claiming that she is married with two children.

The next morning, Nathalie and Janet prepare to leave for Florence and Austria, respectively, but both women have a change of heart and return to their hotel, where they miss each other. As Bepi and Nina prepare to move in together, Nathalie suddenly appears and hugs Bepi, announcing that she is staying in Venice. Furious, Nina storms off to marry Toni. In the church, Nina confides in Don Fulgenzio that she does not love Toni but insists that the wedding must take place immediately in secrecy.

Bepi and Nina argue over his involvement with the Americans and her engagement to Toni. When the letters that they have written to each other accidentally fall into the canal below, the two rush outside to retrieve the letters, and Nina agrees to come over to Bepi's so they can talk things over. Bepi is unexpectedly visited by Janet, who confesses that she lied about being married and having children, and suggests that they get married. When Nina arrives at Bepi's, he hides her in the kitchen before telling Janet to go to the American consulate.

In Nathalie's hotel room, she is devastated when Bepi claims he is married with two children, in an attempt to convince her to return to the United States. When Bepi says it was an arranged marriage, Nathalie offers to take him to the U.S. and help him divorce. Meanwhile, Janet visits Nina's gift shop, unaware that she is Bepi's fiancée, to buy him a gift. Janet notices a one-of-a-kind lamp with a music box that plays Bepi's favorite song, which she instantly recognizes. Nina sells the lamp to Janet, suspecting that the gift is for Bepi.

Outside the hotel, Bepi encounters Janet, who hands him the gift and tells him to meet her at the American consulate later that day. At Nina's home, Bepi gives her the lamp as a gift, before Nina reveals that she sold the lamp to one of the Americans that morning. Heartbroken, Nina orders Bepi to leave and smashes the lamp. On Don Fulgenzio's advice, Bepi sets out to convince the two American women to leave Venice. He meets Janet at the American consulate and, dressed in a cassock, tells her that he cannot marry her because he has returned to priesthood.

Arriving at the train station, where Nathalie is waiting for him, Bepi lies that he has left something burning in the kitchen and disembarks the train. Janet boards the same train as Nathalie, and the two women encounter each other. Bepi rushes to Nina and Toni's wedding ceremony, where Nina reveals to Bepi that she said "no" at the altar, and the two happily reconcile. Some time later, Bepi and Nina have a toddler son, and she continues to keep a watchful eye on him when he takes attractive tourists on his gondola.

== Cast ==
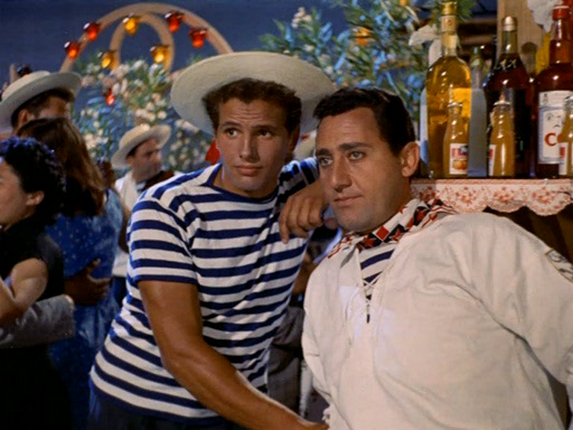
Giuliano Gemma and Alberto Sordi

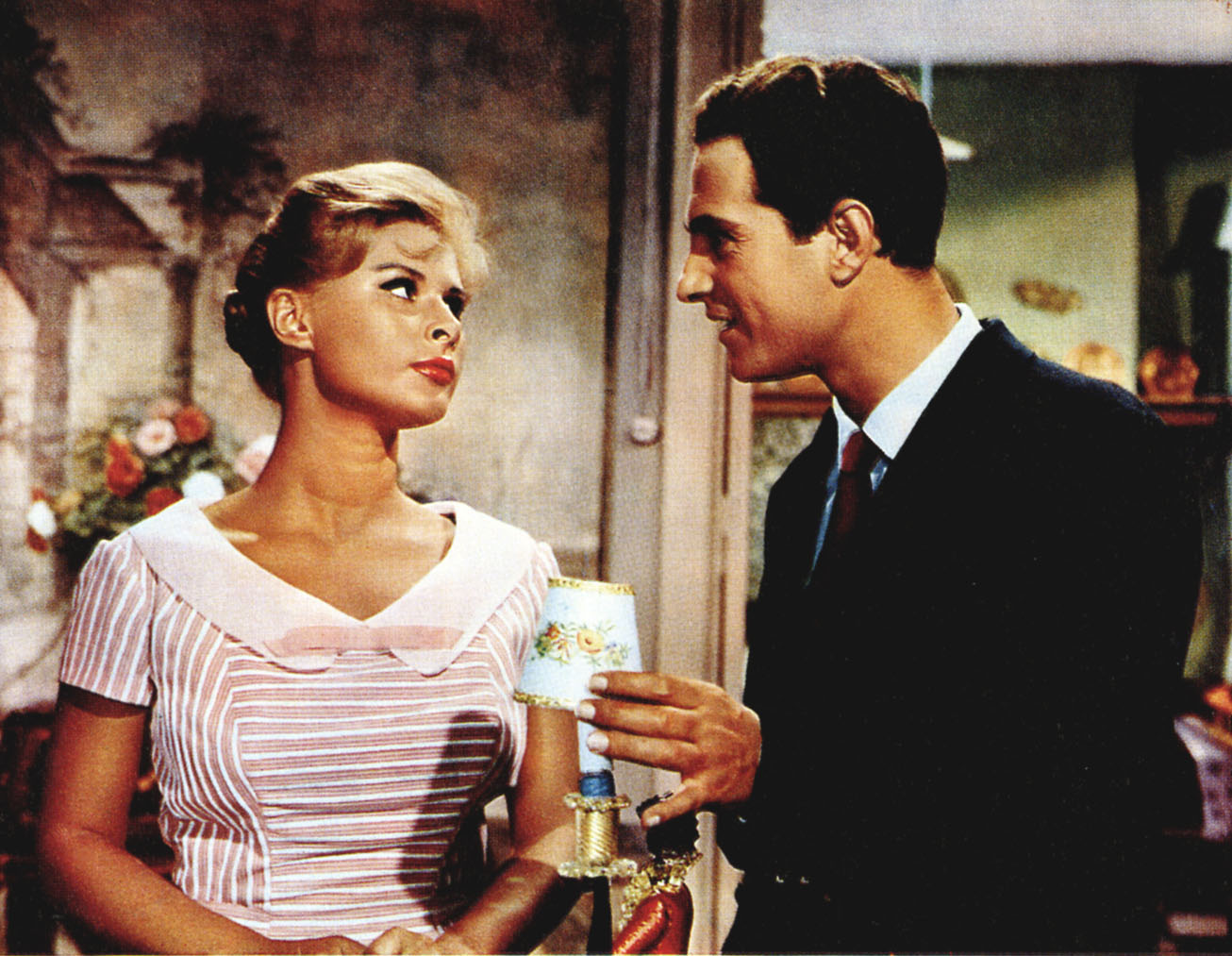
Marisa Allasio and Nino Manfredi

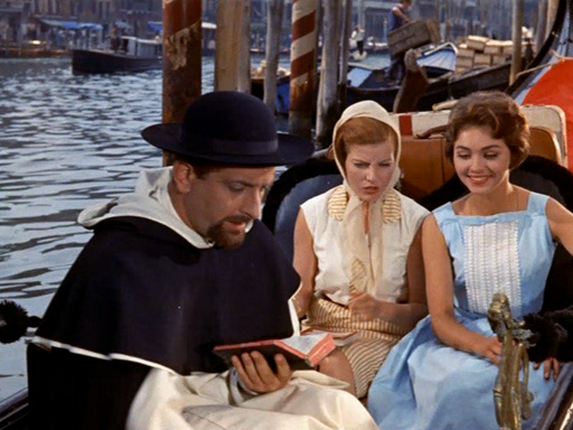
Riccardo Garrone, Niki Dantine and Ingeborg Schöner

- Alberto Sordi as Bepi
- Marisa Allasio as Nina
- Ingeborg Schöner (credited as Inge Schoener) as Nathalie
- Niki Dantine as Janet
- Riccardo Garrone as Don Fulgenzio
- Luciano Marcelli as Don Giuseppe
- Anna Campori as Claudia
- Dina De Santis as Gina
- Nino Manfredi as Toni
- Giuliano Gemma as Brando (uncredited)

== Release ==
Released in October 1958, the film was a major success, grossing 650 million lire. It was later re-released with the titles I due gondolieri (The Two Gondoliers) and Riuscirà Bepi a sventare le astute trame di Toni e sposare la bella Nina? (Will Bepi Manage to Foil Toni's Cunning Schemes and Marry the Beautiful Nina?), emphasizing the presence of Nino Manfredi, who had by then become a major star, as co-protagonist.
