= Maurizio Arena =

Italian actor (1933–1979)

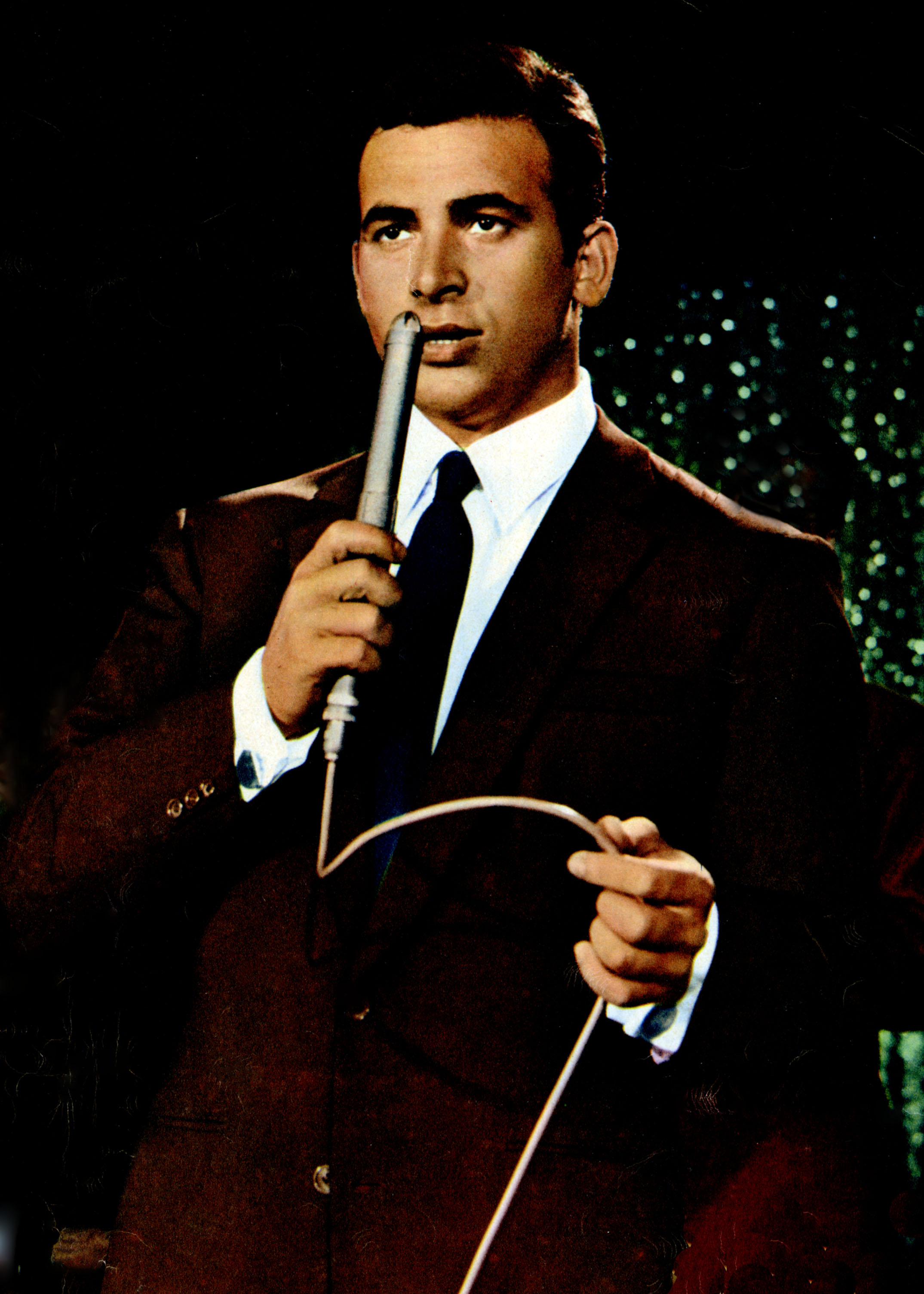
- Born: Maurizio Di Lorenzo; 26 December 1933; Rome, Kingdom of Italy
- Died: 21 November 1979 (aged 45); Rome, Italy
- Occupation: Actor
- Years active: 1952–1978
- Relatives: Rossana Di Lorenzo (sister); Pino Insegno (nephew)

Maurizio Di Lorenzo (26 December 1933 – 21 November 1979), known professionally as Maurizio Arena, was an Italian film actor. He appeared in more than 70 films between 1952 and 1978.

== Life and career ==
Born in Rome as Maurizio Di Lorenzo, Arena made his film debut at nineteen years old, with a small role in Bellezze in moto-scooter. His breakout role came in 1956 with the role of Romolo in the successful Dino Risi's romance-comedy film Poor, But Handsome. Until the early 1960s Arena was one of the most popular actors in the Italian cinema, and was a regular feature of gossip columns for his tumultuous personal life. His sister Rossana Di Lorenzo followed his footsteps and also became an actress.

In later years his celebrity declined, and Arena found roles as a character actor in smaller films, and occasionally worked as a singer. He became an alternative medicine healer with some local following.

He died at age 45 following a heart attack, a complication from a long-standing renal condition.

In 2008 a park was named after him in his native district Garbatella.

== Selected filmography ==
- La figlia del diavolo (1952) - Corrado
- Beauties on Motor Scooters (1952)
- Siamo tutti inquilini (1953) - Carlo
- Roman Holiday (1953) - Young Boy with Car (uncredited)
- La lupa (1953)
- It Happened in the Park (1953) - Il fidanzato di Virginia (segment: Incidente a Villa Borghese)
- Tormento d'anim (1953)
- A Day in Court (1954) - Lorenzo (uncredited)
- Tripoli, Beautiful Land of Love (1954) - Feruccio
- Peppino e la vecchia signora (1954)
- Toto and Carolina (1955) - Mario, il ladro
- The Sign of Venus (1955) - Maurice
- Roman Tales (1955) - Mario
- Processo all'amore (1955)
- La porta dei sogni (1955) - Silvio
- Accadde di notte (1956)
- Tempo di villeggiatura (1956) - Checco
- Un giglio infranto (1956) - Ferdinando
- Sangue di zingara (1956) - Tore
- Poor, But Handsome (1957) - Romolo Toccacieli
- The Black Devil (1957) - Ruggero
- The Man Who Wagged His Tail (1957) - Alfonso
- Pretty But Poor (1957) - Romolo Toccacieli
- Vacanze a Ischia (1957) - Franco
- Buongiorno primo amore! (1957) - Giancarlo
- Il cocco di mamma (1958) - Aldo Manca
- Napoli, sole mio! (1958) - Michele Brunati
- The Italians They Are Crazy (1958) - Benedetti
- Valeria ragazza poco seria (1958) - Mario Renzetti
- Love and Troubles (1958) - Roberto
- Via col para... vento (1958) - Alberto Pompei
- Caporale di giornata (1958) - Felice Fornari
- Marinai, donne e guai (1958) - Mario Santarelli
- Avventura a Capri (1959) - Mario
- Poor Millionaires (1959) - Romolo
- Noi siamo due evasi (1959) - Brigadiere Francesco Curti
- The Defeated Victor (1959) - Romolo De Santis
- La duchessa di Santa Lucia (1959) - Carlo
- The Magistrate (1959) - Orlando Di Giovanni
- Terror of Oklahoma (1959) - Clay Norton
- Simpatico mascalzone (1959) - Mario
- Policarpo (1959) - il fattorino dei fiori
- Il principe fusto (1960) - Ettore
- Il carabiniere a cavallo (1961) - Renato Gorini
- You Must Be Blonde on Capri (1961) - Roberto Calli
- Maurizio, Peppino e le indossatrici (1961) - Maurizio Innocenzi
- Fra' Manisco cerca guai (1961) - Giulio
- Pugni, pupe e marinai (1961) - Alberto Mariani
- The Legion's Last Patrol (1962) - Dolce Vita
- Il giorno più corto (1962)
- I soliti rapinatori a Milano (1963) - Aldo
- Via Veneto (1964)
- La fuga (1965) - Alberto Spina
- Le bambole (1965) - Massimo (segment "Il Trattato di Eugenetica")
- The Peking Medallion (1967) - Danny
- Gli altri, gli altri... e noi (1967) - Antonio
- They Came to Rob Las Vegas (1968) - Clark
- Agnaldo, Perigo à Vista (1969)
- Mazzabubù... quante corna stanno quaggiù? (1971) - Giuseppe
- Er Più – storia d'amore e di coltello (1971) - Bartolo Di Lorenzo
- Storia di fifa e di coltello - Er seguito d'er più (1972) - Bartolo Di Lorenzo
- Anche se volessi lavorare, che faccio? (1972) - Garrone
- Storia de fratelli e de cortelli (1973) - Nino
- The Assassination of Matteotti (1973) - Communist Activist
- Società a responsabilità molto limitata (1973) - Gateano Stipoli
- The Godson of the Godfather (1973) - Don Vincenzo
- The Balloon Vendor (1974) - Romolo
- To Love Ophelia (1974) - Spartaco Cesaroni
- Loaded Guns (1975) - Padre Best
- Hallucination Strip (1975) - Buscemi, Il Siciliano
- Il sogno di Zorro (1975) - Friar Miguel
- Remo e Romolo (Storia di due figli di una lupa) (1976) - Marte
- The Career of a Chambermaid (1976) - Luciani
- Vai col liscio (1976) - Aldemiro
- Atti impuri all'italiana (1976) - Gedeone - the Mayor
- The Mistress Is Served (1976) - Domenico Cardona
- Puttana galera! (1976) - Marpione
- La Bidonata (1977) - Maurizio
- Pugni, dollari e spinaci (1978) - Sammy Mania
