= Trastevere (film) =

1971 Italian comedy by Fausto Tozzi

- Directed by: Fausto Tozzi
- Written by: Fausto Tozzi
- Produced by: Alberto Grimaldi
- Starring: Nino Manfredi; Rosanna Schiaffino; Vittorio Caprioli; Ottavia Piccolo; Vittorio De Sica
- Cinematography: Arturo Zavattini
- Edited by: Nino Baragli; Carlo Reali
- Music by: Maurizio De Angelis; Guido De Angelis
- Release date: 1971
- Country: Italy
- Languages: Italian, Romanesco

Trastevere (Italian pronunciation: [traˈsteːvere]) is a 1971 Italian comedy film. It is the first and only film directed by actor and screenwriter Fausto Tozzi.

== Cast ==
- Nino Manfredi as Carmelo Mazzullo
- Rosanna Schiaffino as Caterina 'Rama' Peretti
- Vittorio Caprioli as Don Ernesto
- Ottavia Piccolo as Nanda
- Vittorio De Sica as Enrico Formichi
- Leopoldo Trieste as The professor
- Mickey Fox (credited as Mikey Fox) as Sora Regina
- Milena Vukotic as Delia, the wife of the professor
- Gigi Ballista as the count
- Ronald K. Pennington (credited as Ronald Kerry Pennington) as Kerry
- Luigi Uzzo as Cesare
- Lino Coletta as Alvaro Diotallevi
- Don Powell as John
- Rossella Como as Teresa
- Fiammetta Baralla as Gigliola
- Enzo Cannavale as Straccale
- Nino Musco as the sergeant
- Luigi Valanzano as the barman
- Lino Murolo as the policeman
- Luciano Pigozzi as the angry man
- Franca Scagnetti as the woman near the other angry man
- Vittorio Fanfoni as Pierre
- Stefano Oppedisano as Gaston
- Leonardo Benvenuti as Officier of GdF (uncredited)
- Nerina Montagnani as Sora Rosa (uncredited)

== Production ==
The film was heavily cut by producer Alberto Grimaldi, who entirely removed the roles of Umberto Orsini, Martine Brochard, and Riccardo Garrone.

== Reception ==
The film was a critical failure but a commercial success, grossing nearly one billion lire at the Italian box office.
