= Pretty But Poor =

Belle ma povere
- Directed by: Dino Risi
- Cinematography: Tonino Delli Colli
- Music by: Piero Piccioni
- Release date: 1957
- Country: Italy
- Language: Italian

Belle ma povere (internationally released as Pretty But Poor) is a 1957 Italian comedy film directed by Dino Risi. It is the sequel of Poor, But Handsome and was followed by Poor Millionaires.

== Plot ==
Romolo and Salvatore are two Roman boys, engaged respectively to Annamaria and Marisa, Salvatore's first sister and Romulus's second. The two girls would like to get married soon, but the two engaged couples have neither a steady job nor (in the case of the men) the intention of putting their heads straight. The men reluctantly follow a radio engineering course in an evening school; however, while Romulus becomes committed to the courses Salvatore quickly abandons them.

The two great friends quarrel when Giovanna, an old flame of both of them, returns. After leaving her beloved Ugo, she now works in the jewelry of her current boyfriend Franco. Romolo thinks that Salvatore is not suitable to marry his sister, and Salvatore thinks the same of Romulus and his sister, and as long as they are both idle the marriage for both will not take place.

But Annamaria and Marisa suffer even more. Marisa, understood that Salvatore will never have a steady job, decides to go to work as a clerk in a shoe shop where she meets a charming young man who courts her. Salvatore, fearing to lose Marisa, decides to become a thief. Meanwhile, Romulus, to open his radio shop, borrows money from Giovanna's boyfriend who, to make her partner jealous and lead him to the wedding, again feigns interest in Romulus, arousing Annamaria's jealousy.

Just when Romulus decides to return the money he had on loan to Giovanna, Salvatore with the help of an accomplice decides to break into Franco's jewelry and steal everything. However, he is stopped by Marisa, who explains to Salvatore that there is nothing between her and the young man. Even between Romulus and Annamaria everything is clarified. Romulus and Salvatore understand that what matters is inner wealth.

The marriages of Romulus with Annamaria and of Salvatore with Marisa are then celebrated on the same day, in the same church, that of Piazza Navona, with the same clothes. And also Giovanna finally gets married with Franco.

== Cast ==
- Marisa Allasio as Giovanna
- Maurizio Arena as Romolo
- Renato Salvatori as Salvatore
- Lorella De Luca as Marisa
- Alessandra Panaro as Anna Maria
- Riccardo Garrone as Franco
- Memmo Carotenuto as Alvaro
- Gildo Bocci
- Marisa Castellani
- Carlo Giuffrè
- Nino Vingelli
