= Marisa Allasio =

Retired Italian actress (born 1936)

- Countess of Bergolo
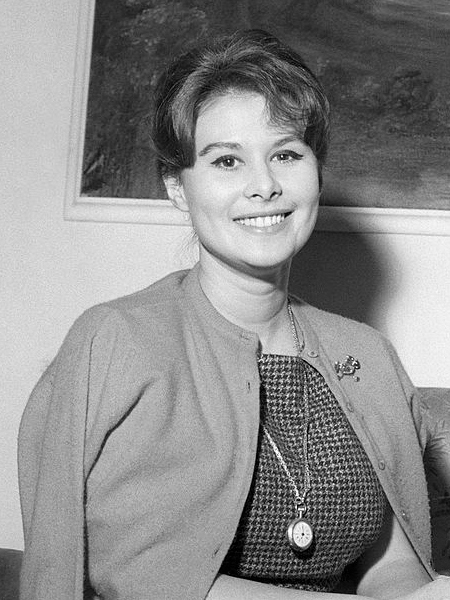
- Allasio in 1959
- Born: Maria Luisa Lucia Allasio; 14 July 1936 (age 89); Turin, Kingdom of Italy
- Spouse: Pier Francesco Calvi, Count of Bergolo (m. 1958; died 2012)
- Issue: Count Carlo of Bergolo; Countess Anda of Bergolo
Names
- Maria Luisa Lucia Allasio
- Father: Federico Allasio
- Mother: Lucia Rocchietti

Maria Luisa Lucia "Marisa" Allasio (born 14 July 1936) is an Italian actress of the 1950s. She appeared in nearly 20 films between 1952 and 1958.

Allasio was considered a typical sex symbol during her film career, which she abandoned in 1958, after marrying Count Pier Francesco Calvi di Bergolo (born 22 December 1932, died 2012), son of Princess Iolanda di Savoia, first-born of Vittorio Emanuele III and Elena del Montenegro. They had two children, Carlo Giorgio Dmitri Drago Maria Laetitia dei Conti Calvi di Bergolo (born 1959, Rome) and Anda Federica Angelica Maria dei Conti Calvi di Bergolo (born 1962, Rome).

== Filmography ==
- Perdonami!, Mario Costa (1953)
- Sunday Heroes, Mario Camerini (1953)
- Cuore di mamma, Luigi Capuano (1954)
- Tragic Ballad, Luigi Capuano (1954)
- Girls of Today, Luigi Zampa (1955)
- Eighteen Year Olds, Mario Mattoli (1955)
- War and Peace, King Vidor (1956)
- Maruzzella, Luigi Capuano (1956)
- Poor, But Handsome, Dino Risi (1957)
- Marisa la civetta, Mauro Bolognini (1957)
- Camping, Franco Zeffirelli (1957)
- Pretty But Poor, Dino Risi (1957)
- Le schiave di Cartagine, Guido Brignone (1957)
- Susanna Whipped Cream, Steno (1957)
- Venice, the Moon and You, Dino Risi (1958)
- Nackt wie Gott sie schuf (Nudi come Dio li creò), Hans Schott-Schöbinger (1958)
- Carmela è una bambola, Gianni Puccini (1958)
- Seven Hills of Rome, Roy Rowland (1958)
