= Fantasma d'amore =

1981 film

- Film poster
- Directed by: Dino Risi
- Screenplay by: Dino Risi; Bernardino Zapponi
- Based on: Fantasma d'amore by Mino Milani
- Produced by: Pio Angeletti; Adriano De Micheli; Luggi Waldleitner
- Starring: Romy Schneider; Marcello Mastroianni
- Cinematography: Tonino Delli Colli
- Edited by: Alberto Gallitti
- Music by: Riz Ortolani
- Production companies: Dean Film; A.M.L.F.; Roxy-Film
- Distributed by: Ceiad
- Release dates: 3 April 1981 (Italy); 29 April 1981 (France); 21 May 1982 (West Germany)
- Running time: 96 minutes
- Countries: Italy; West Germany; France

Fantasma d'amore (transl. Ghost of Love) is a 1981 drama film directed by Dino Risi that stars Romy Schneider and Marcello Mastroianni.

== Plot ==
Nino, a married tax accountant, sees on a bus Anna, the woman he loved 20 years ago, now poor and ill. After he gives her money for her fare, she hops off and disappears. That night she calls him at his home to say she can repay him and he goes to the dingy address she gives, where he takes the money and she again disappears. Later it emerges that the concierge has been bloodily murdered.

To the dismay of his wife, he becomes obsessed with Anna, seeing flashbacks of her when young and beautiful and trying to meet her again. After a doctor friend of his who knew her says she died three years ago, he is found dead at the hospital where he worked. She rings him to say he can visit her at a mansion in the country. To his joy, the young Anna welcomes him, but will not let him have sex since she is now married to the owner, Count Zighi. Later, she rings to say they can have sex in a boat on the river as they used to do. When he stops the boat in a quiet place, she falls in and disappears under the water.

Nino informs the police, who start searching, and his irate wife leaves him. Going to Count Zighi to explain, he is told by the angry count that Anna died three years ago. This is confirmed by the housekeeper, who takes him to the grave. Going back to the police, he apologizes for his story and says he was, in fact, with a prostitute. They say that a body has been found, but it is a man who was on the river bank.

The film ends in the grounds of a nursing home, where a shapely nurse comes to bring Nino indoors. When we see her face, it is the young Anna.

== Cast ==
- Romy Schneider as Anna Brigatti Zighi
- Marcello Mastroianni as Nino Monti
- Eva Maria Meineke as Teresa Monti
- Wolfgang Preiss as Conte Zighi
- Michael Kroecher as Don Gaspare
- Paolo Baroni as Ressi
- Victoria Zinny as Loredana
- Giampiero Becherelli as Prof. Arnaldi
- Ester Carloni
- Riccardo Parisio Perrotti
- Raf Baldassarre as Luciano
- Maria Simona Peruzzi
- Liliana Pacinotti
- Adriana Giuffrè

== Production ==
Fantasma d'amore was shot on location in Pavia and Cine Industrial Studios in Rome. The film started shooting on October 26, 1980.

== Release ==
Fantasma d'amore was distributed by Ceiad in Italy on 3 April 1981. It was released in France as Fantôme d'amour on 29 April 1981 and in West Germany on 21 May 1982 as Die zwei Gesichter einer Frau. The film was also screened at the 1982 Chicago International Film Festival in October 1982.

== See also ==
- List of Italian films of 1981

== Notes ==
=== References ===
- Curti, Roberto (2019). Italian Gothic Horror Films, 1980-1989. McFarland. ISBN 978-1476672434.
