= The Cricket (1980 film) =

- Directed by: Alberto Lattuada
- Written by: Marina Di Leo; Franco Ferrini; Alberto Lattuada; Natale Prinetto
- Produced by: Manolo Bolognini; Bianca Lattuada; Ibrahim Moussa
- Starring: Anthony Franciosa; Virna Lisi
- Cinematography: Danilo Desideri
- Music by: Fred Bongusto
- Distributed by: NIR
- Release date: 18 April 1980
- Running time: 101 min.
- Country: Italy
- Language: Italian

The Cricket (Italian: La Cicala) is a 1980 Italian erotic drama film directed by Alberto Lattuada. For this film Virna Lisi was awarded the David di Donatello for best actress, while Fred Bongusto won the Nastro d'Argento for best score.

== Plot summary ==
As noted in a January 2007 edit summary the following is lifted word for word from IMDb where it is bylined as by Mark van Dyke (Symian) of RealmBBS.

Clio plays a fun-loving girl who likes men. She leaves her home town and meets up with Wilma, a once-famous singer. After Wilma bombs out at a local joint they hook up together and become prostitutes.

Enter Tony who falls for Wilma and opens a gas/food/lodging establishment after they marry. Tony slowly gets fed up with Wilma, especially after her beautiful daughter arrives. An erotic yet tragic film.

== Cast ==
- Virna Lisi: Wilma Malinverni
- Anthony Franciosa: Annibale Mereghetti aka Ulisses
- Renato Salvatori: Carburo
- Clio Goldsmith: Cicala
- Barbara De Rossi: Saveria
- Aristide Caporale: Bretella
- Riccardo Garrone: Ermete
