= La banda Casaroli =

1962 film

- Directed by: Florestano Vancini
- Screenplay by: Florestano Vancini; Federico Zardi
- Produced by: Gianni Hecht Lucari
- Starring: Renato Salvatori; Jean-Claude Brialy; Tomas Milian
- Cinematography: Alessandro D'Eva
- Edited by: Tatiana Casini
- Music by: Mario Nascimbene
- Release date: 1962
- Country: Italy
- Language: Italian

La banda Casaroli is a 1962 Italian crime-drama film directed by Florestano Vancini. The film is based on real life events of criminal group led by Paolo Casaroli.

== Plot ==
In a fog-shrouded square in Bologna, a young man named Gabriele Ingenis roams among onlookers under the arcades, visibly dazed after a recent bloody shootout. Gabriele, an Istrian refugee, had crossed paths with his old friend Corrado Minguzzi and Paolo Casaroli a few months earlier at a Bologna Luna Park.

Together, the trio embarks on a shared destiny, obtaining weapons and forming a gang of bank robbers with occasional accomplices. Their first robbery, almost impromptu, takes place in a Lombardy agricultural center against a small bank. As the gang becomes more organized, they stage a heist in Genoa, targeting a bank full of employees and customers, successfully emptying the safe.

Flush with cash, the three move from Bologna to Venice, living the good life by enjoying the company of easy-going women and trying their luck at the casino. Running low on funds, they decide to make a big score in Rome. However, the plan goes awry when a cashier tries to disarm Casaroli during the heist. Ingenis intervenes, shooting the cashier, and as they flee, Minguzzi fires at a pursuer, triggering an alarm.

Their attempt to evade the police in Rome results in more casualties. Believing his friends are dead, the uninvolved Ingenis commits suicide in a cinema with a gunshot. Casaroli, severely injured but still alive, is hospitalized. A journalist manages to talk to him, and upon leaving, hears the outlaw singing the chorus of "Paquito lindo," a song from the movie Fear and Sand.

== Cast ==
- Renato Salvatori as Paolo Casaroli
- Jean-Claude Brialy as Corrado Minguzzi
- Tomas Milian as Gabriele Ingenis
- Gabriele Tinti as Agent Spinelli
- Leonardo Severini as Pietro Seria
- Marcella Rovena as Gabriele's mother
- Isa Querio as Paolo's mother
- Adriano Micantoni as Giuliano Rinaldi
