= Alessandra Panaro =

Italian actress (1939–2019)

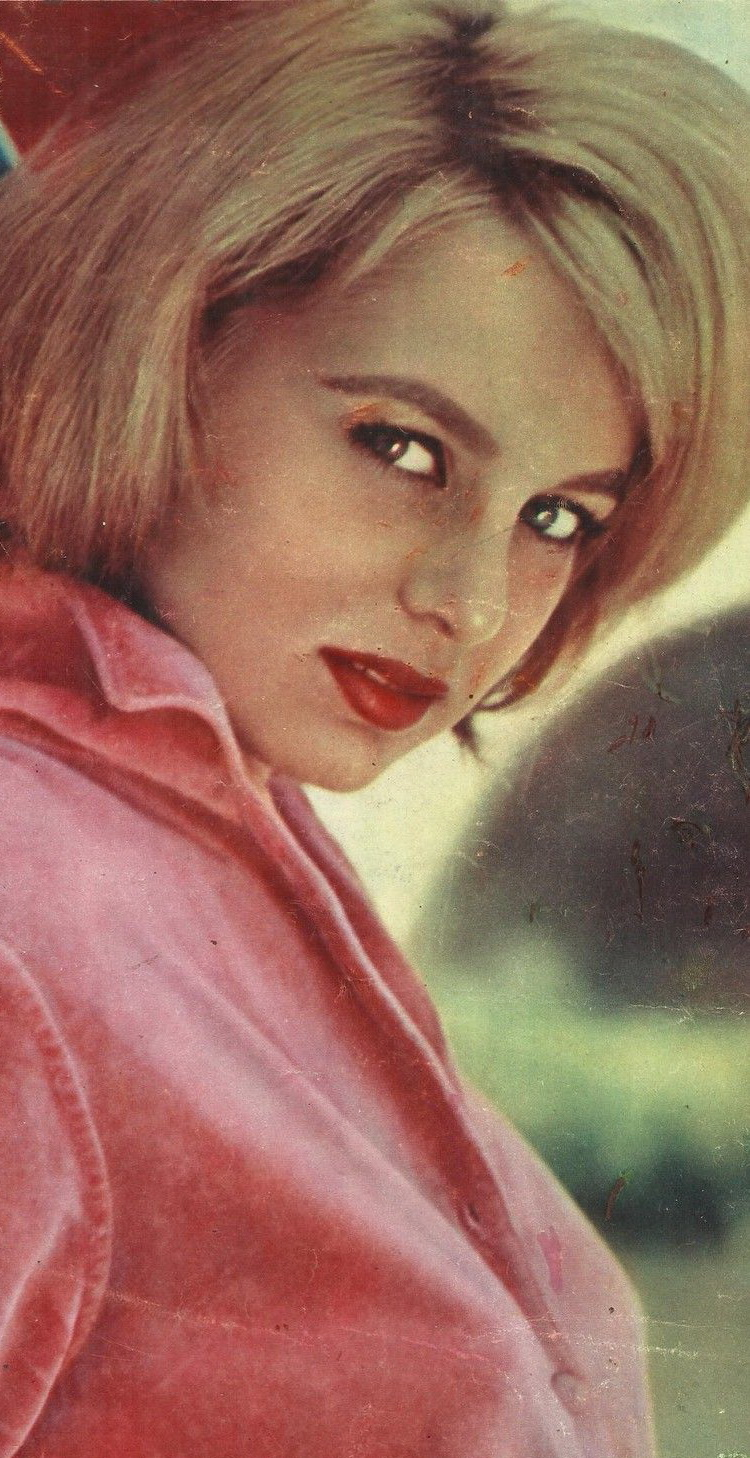
- Panaro in 1959
- Born: 14 December 1939; Rome, Kingdom of Italy
- Died: 1 May 2019 (aged 79); Geneva, Switzerland
- Years active: 1954–2016
- Spouse(s): Jean-Pierre Sabet (?–1983) (his death); Giancarlo Sbragia (1992–1994) (his death)

Alessandra Panaro (14 December 1939 – 1 May 2019) was an Italian film actress of the late 1950s and early 1960s.

Panaro is best known for her films in the early 1960s, notably Luchino Visconti's crime drama Rocco and His Brothers in 1960.

== Life and career ==
Born in Rome into a wealthy family, Panaro studied acting under Teresa Franchini. She made her film debut at 16 years old, and got a large success in 1956 thanks to the Dino Risi's comedy film Poor, But Handsome, then specializing in romantic comedies. In 1957–8, together with her Poor, But Handsome co-star Lorella De Luca, she assisted Mario Riva in presenting the popular RAI game show Il Musichiere.

== Personal life ==
Panaro was first married to the Italian-Egyptian banker Jean-Pierre Sabet. Widowed, in 1992 she married the actor Giancarlo Sbragia.

She died on 1 May 2019 in her home in Geneva at the age of 79.

== Partial filmography ==
- The Boatman of Amalfi (1954)
- Destination Piovarolo (1955)
- Il campanile d'oro (1955)
- Wild Love (1956) – Marcella
- Guardia, guardia scelta, brigadiere e maresciallo (1956) – Charlotte
- I miliardari (1956) – Mariuccia
- Mamma sconosciuta (1956) – Lia
- Cantando sotto le stelle (1956) – Lucia Traversa
- Poor, But Handsome (1957) – Anna Maria
- Lazzarella (1957) – Sandra Carpella
- Pretty But Poor (1957) – Anna Maria
- La trovatella di Pompei (1957) – Maria Molinaro / Curti
- Love and Chatter (1958) – Doddy Paseroni
- Si le roi savait ça (1958) – Mireille
- Toto, Peppino and the Fanatics (1958) – Vignanelli's Daughter
- Te doy mi vida (1958)
- L'ultima canzone (1958)
- Cigarettes, Whiskey and Wild Women (1959)
- I ragazzi dei Parioli (1959) – Susy
- Avventura a Capri (1959) – Sandra
- Poor Millionaires (1959) – Annamaria
- Le notti dei Teddy Boys (1959) – Luisa
- Il raccomandato di ferro (1959) – Wilma
- Cerasella (1959) – Nora
- Rocco and His Brothers (1960) – Ciro's fiancée
- The Bacchantes (1961) – Manto
- Pecado de amor (1961) – Esperanza
- Mariti a congresso (1961)
- Ulysses Against the Son of Hercules (1962) – Elena
- The Son of Captain Blood (1962) – Abigail 'Abby' McBride
- The Secret Mark of D'Artagnan (1962) – Diana
- The Executioner of Venice (1963) – Leonora Danin
- Hercules vs. Moloch (1964) – Medea, Queen of Tyro
- Temple of the White Elephant (1964) – Cynthia Montague
- The Shoot (1964) – Frau des Schut (uncredited)
- The Treasure of the Aztecs (1965) – Rosita Arbellez
- The Pyramid of the Sun God (1965) – Rosita Arbellez
- Gold Train (1965) – Pamela Webb
- La notte dell'addio (1966)
- Sexycop (1976)
- La notte è piccola per noi (2016) – Adelina (final film role)
