= Francesco Mulè =

Italian actor (1926–1984)

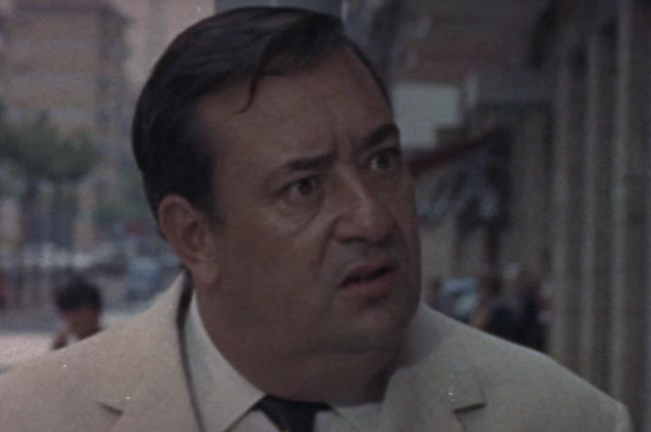
- Mulè in Pensando a te (1969)
- Born: 3 December 1926; Rome, Italy
- Died: 4 November 1984 (aged 57); Rome, Italy
- Occupation: Actor
- Years active: 1953–1979

Francesco Mulè (3 December 1926 – 4 November 1984), was an Italian actor, voice actor and television and radio personality. He appeared in 74 films between 1953 and 1979.

Born in Rome, son of composer Giuseppe Mulè, he studied at the Silvio d’Amico Academy of Dramatic Arts and debuted in the stage company held by Renzo Ricci. He reached a large popularity thanks to his radio and television appearances as a presenter and a comedian. He was also active as a character actor in films and on stage. Mulè was the Italian voice of Yogi Bear.

== Selected filmography ==
- Empty Eyes (1953) - Marcucci, Fernando's colleague
- The Walk (1953) - Un insegnante
- Camilla (1954) - Il pappagallo in auto (uncredited)
- The Bachelor (1956) - Cosimo
- Souvenir d'Italie (1957) - Lawyer Andrea Mazzoni
- Susanna Whipped Cream (1957) - Un altro ladro
- Femmine tre volte (1957) - Presidente squadra baseball
- Camping (1958) - Don Clemente
- Toto in the Moon (1958) - Il vigile urbano
- Girls for the Summer (1958) - L'albergatore
- Totò, Eva e il pennello proibito (1959) - Don Alonzo
- The Friend of the Jaguar (1959) - Ugo, l'orefice
- Le signore (1960) - Dentist Filippo
- Il carro armato dell'8 settembre (1960)
- Totò, Peppino e...la dolce vita (1961) - Guglielmo, un signore eccentrico
- Sua Eccellenza si fermò a mangiare (1961) - Il commissario
- Hercules in the Valley of Woe (1961)
- La ragazza di mille mesi (1961) - Amleto il Cameriere
- Cronache del '22 (1961)
- Psycosissimo (1962) - Arturo Michelotti
- I Don Giovanni della Costa Azzurra (1962) - Baldassarre Giaconia
- Appuntamento in Riviera (1962) - Marengoni
- The Four Musketeers (1963) - Louis XIII
- The Shortest Day (1963) - (uncredited)
- Adultero lui, adultera lei (1963) - Il commissario
- La pupa (1963)
- Follie d'estate (1963) - Altro tipo in spiaggia
- Il treno del sabato (1964) - Mario Mancini
- White Voices (1964) - The Trappist Monk
- I marziani hanno 12 mani (1964) - Ambasciatore Austriaco
- Il Gaucho (1964) - Fiorini
- Corpse for the Lady (1964) - Augusto Ferrante
- Latin Lovers (1965) - L'avvocato (segment "L'irreparabile")
- Spiaggia libera (1966) - Falso Prete
- A Maiden for a Prince (1966) - Don Daniel
- Dr. Goldfoot and the Girl Bombs (1966) - Colonel Doug Benson
- Operation White Shark (1966)
- Mano di velluto (1966)
- Come rubare un quintale di diamanti in Russia (1967) - Groeber
- On My Way to the Crusades, I Met a Girl Who... (1967) - Rienzi
- Ric e Gian alla conquista del West (1967) - Maggiore Jefferson
- The Biggest Bundle of Them All (1968) - Antonio Tozzi
- Danger: Diabolik (1968) - Crematoria Operator (uncredited)
- The Most Beautiful Couple in the World (1968) - Commendatore Gennaroni
- Il marito è mio e l'ammazzo quando mi pare (1968) - Duke Ostanzo
- House of Cards (1968) - Policeman at Trevi Fountain
- Vacanze sulla Costa Smeralda (1968) - Inspector Antonio Grassu
- Il terribile ispettore (1969) - Agapito Trigallo
- Il ragazzo che sorride (1969) - Undertaker's establishment owner
- The Secret of Santa Vittoria (1969) - Francucci
- Diary of a Telephone Operator (1969) - L'Esaminatore
- Pensiero d'amore (1969) - Ser Domenico Meniconi
- Pensando a te (1969) - Undertaker
- Story of a Woman (1970) - Manzetti
- The Divorce (1970) - Friar Leone
- When Women Had Tails (1970) - Uto
- Nel giorno del Signore (1970) - Papa Leone X
- Lacrime d'amore (1970) - Her father
- Riuscirà il nostro eroe a ritrovare il più grande diamante del mondo? (1971) - Gran Capo
- Riuscirà l'avvocato Franco Benenato a sconfiggere il suo acerrimo nemico il pretore Ciccio De Ingras? (1971) - Onorevole Megrini
- When Women Lost Their Tails (1972) - Uto
- Cause for Divorce (1972) - Judge
- Il terrore con gli occhi storti (1972) - Questore
- Meo Patacca (1972) - Roman Prince
- 4 caporali e ½ e un colonnello tutto d'un pezzo (1973)
- Il lumacone (1974) - Pietro
- Calore in provincia (1975) - Calogero Lentini
- L'infermiera di mio padre (1976)
- Confessions of a Lady Cop (1976) - Alfredo Amicucci, Gianna's Father
- Voto di castità (1976) - Teodoro
- Il pomicione (1976) - Raffaele Moscone
- Gli uccisori (1977)
- Orazi e curiazi 3-2 (1977) - Ango
- Kakkientruppen (1977) - Il cuoco
- Malabestia (1978) - Giubileo
- La supplente va in città (1979) - Davide Romiti - the father
