= The Friend of the Jaguar =

1959 film

- Directed by: Giuseppe Bennati
- Written by: Giuseppe Bennati; Fausto Tozzi; Edoardo Anton; Marcello Fondato
- Produced by: Luigi Giacosi
- Starring: Walter Chiari; Isabelle Corey; Carlo Romano
- Cinematography: Tonino Delli Colli
- Edited by: Eraldo Da Roma
- Music by: Alexandre Derevitsky
- Production company: Internazionale Produzione Cinematografica
- Distributed by: CEI Incom
- Release date: March 3, 1959
- Running time: 99 minutes
- Country: Italy
- Language: Italian

The Friend of the Jaguar (Italian: L'amico del giaguaro) is a 1959 Italian comedy film directed by Giuseppe Bennati and starring Walter Chiari, Isabelle Corey and Carlo Romano. The film's sets were designed by the art director Piero Filippone.

== Cast ==
- Walter Chiari as Augusto
- Isabelle Corey as Gianna
- Carlo Romano as Il commendatore
- Mario Carotenuto as Cesare
- Carlo Delle Piane as Pecorino
- Alberto Talegalli as Il rurale
- Toni Ucci as Gettone
- Giuseppe Robby as Vittorio
- Anna Campori as Padrona del bar
- Francesco Mulè as Ugo, l'orefice
- Elke Sommer as Grete
- Riccardo Garrone as Il rappresentante
- Gabriella Pallotta as Marisa
