= The Career of a Chambermaid =

- Directed by: Dino Risi
- Written by: Bernardino Zapponi; Ruggero Maccari; Dino Risi
- Produced by: Pio Angeletti
- Starring: Agostina Belli; Vittorio Gassman; Ugo Tognazzi
- Cinematography: Claudio Cirillo
- Edited by: Alberto Gallitti
- Music by: Armando Trovajoli
- Release date: 1976
- Running time: 120 minutes
- Country: Italy
- Language: Italian

Telefoni bianchi (transl. White Telephones, internationally released as The Career of a Chambermaid) is a 1976 Italian comedy film directed by Dino Risi. For this film Agostina Belli was awarded with a Special David di Donatello for her performance. The title refers to the White Telephone comedies of the 1930s and 1940s.

== Synopsis ==
The film is a comic portrayal of the Italian film industry during the Fascist era in which an ambitious young woman briefly rises to become a film star.

== Cast ==
- Agostina Belli: Marcella Valmarín
- Cochi Ponzoni: Roberto Trevisan
- Maurizio Arena: Luciani
- William Berger: Franz
- Lino Toffolo: Gondrano
- Vittorio Gassman: Franco D’Enza
- Ugo Tognazzi: Adelmo
- Renato Pozzetto: Lt. Bruni
- Dino Baldazzi: Benito Mussolini
- Paolo Baroni: Gabriellino
- Alvaro Vitali: Mario, the son in the brothel

== See also ==
- List of Italian films of 1976
- Telefoni Bianchi (White telephones)

== Bibliography ==
- Gundle, Stephen. Mussolini's Dream Factory: Film Stardom in Fascist Italy. Berghahn Books, 2013.
