= Riccardo Garrone (actor) =

Italian actor (1926–2016)

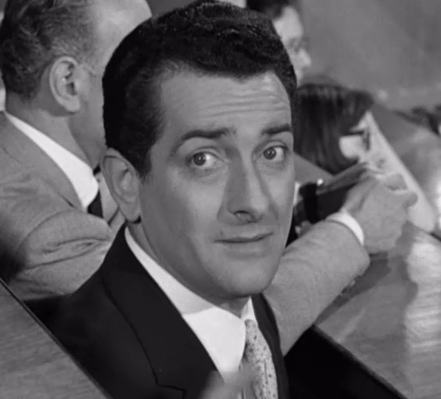
- Garrone in The Most Wonderful Moment (1957)
- Born: 1 November 1926; Rome, Italy
- Died: 14 March 2016 (aged 89); Milan, Italy
- Occupations: Actor; voice actor
- Years active: 1949–2014
- Height: 1.87 m (6 ft 2 in)
- Children: 1
- Relatives: Sergio Garrone (brother)

Riccardo Garrone (1 November 1926 – 14 March 2016) was an Italian actor and dubber.

== Biography ==
Garrone began his acting career in 1949 and attended the Silvio d'Amico National Academy of Dramatic Arts. He appeared in more than 140 films from 1949 until his retirement in 2014. He made his debut in the film Adam and Eve directed by Mario Mattoli. He also worked in several theatre productions alongside other actors such as Vittorio Gassman, Diana Torrieri and Elena Zareschi.

Garrone often portrayed characters with persuasive, polite personalities in a variety of B movie comedies, spaghetti-westerns and horrors. In the 1980s, he made frequent stage collaborations with Antonella Steni and he made more appearances on television. One of his most popular television roles was on Un medico in famiglia in which he portrayed Nicola Solari. He also had a recurring role on Amico mio starring Massimo Dapporto.

Garrone also worked occasionally as a voice actor and dubber. He often dubbed characters in animated films. He was internationally renowned for providing the Italian voice of Lots-O'-Huggin' Bear in Toy Story 3.

=== Personal life ===
Garrone was married to Grazia Maria Verità and they had one daughter, Francesca. Garrone was also the younger brother of director Sergio Garrone. He retired in 2014.

Garrone died in Milan on 14 March 2016 at the age of 89.

== Selected filmography ==
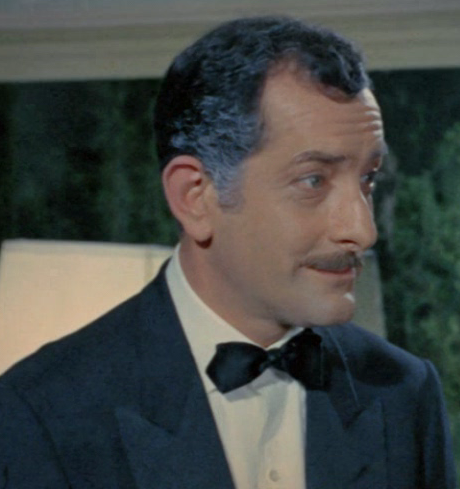
Garrone in Il ragazzo che sorride (1969)

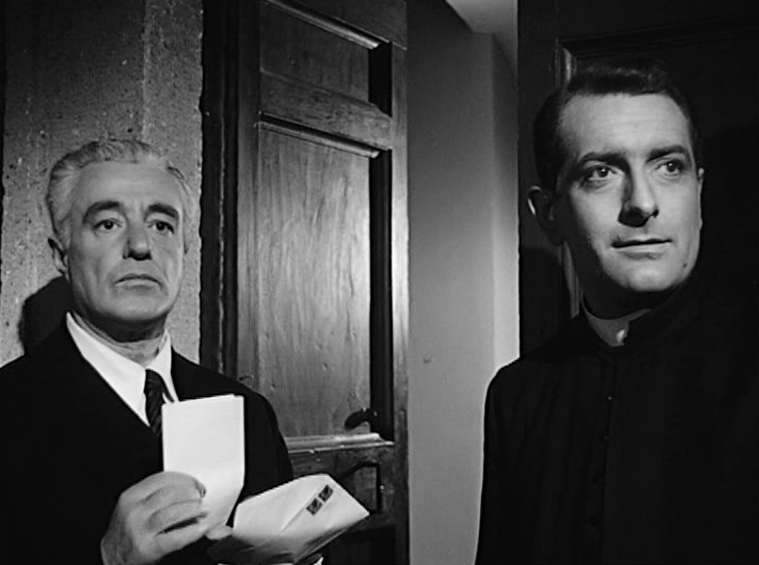
Garrone (right) with Vittorio De Sica in My Wife's Enemy (1959)

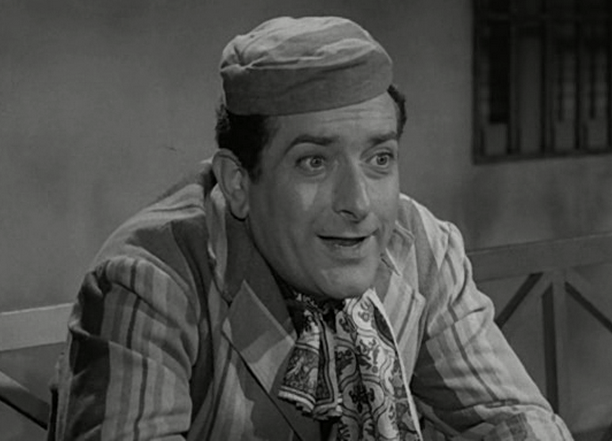
Garrone in I due pericoli pubblici (1964)

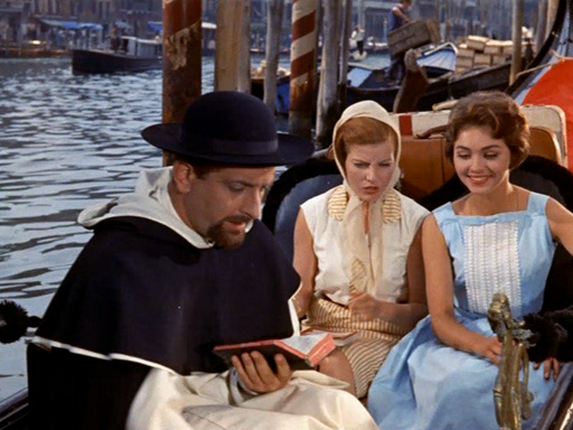
Garrone (left) with Niki Dantine and Ingeborg Schöner in Venice, the Moon and You (1958)

- Adam and Eve (1949) - Pistolero sudista (uncredited)
- Torment of the Past (1952) - Complice di Bianchi
- Brothers of Italy (1952)
- I sette dell'Orsa maggiore (1953)
- Two Nights with Cleopatra (1954) - Ufficiale delle guardie (uncredited)
- Woman of Rome (1954) - Giancarlo
- Il Bidone (1955) - Riccardo
- La rossa (1955) - Pierre
- Una sera di maggio (1955)
- Helen of Troy (1956) - Minor Role (uncredited)
- Guardia, guardia scelta, brigadiere e maresciallo (1956) - The Driver into No-Parking Area
- The Railroad Man (1956) - L'amico di Marcello (uncredited)
- Una voce, una chitarra, un po' di luna (1956) - Mario
- Il prezzo della gloria (1956) - capo macchinista Morabito
- Addio sogni di gloria (1957)
- Fathers and Sons (1957) - Carlo Corallo (uncredited)
- The Most Wonderful Moment (1957) - Il dottor Benvenuti
- Doctor and the Healer (1957) - Sergeant
- Lazzarella (1957) - Sandra's father
- Pretty But Poor (1957) - Franco
- L'ultima violenza (1957) - Giorgio Carani
- Love and Chatter (1958) - Il telecronista
- Le dritte (1958) - Lello
- Venice, the Moon and You (1958) - Don Fulgenzio
- Caporale di giornata (1958) - The Lieutenant
- The Friend of the Jaguar (1959) - Il rappresentante
- My Wife's Enemy (1959) - Michele
- Ciao, ciao bambina! (1959) - Guido Branca
- La cento chilometri (1959) - Cesare Malabrocca
- Audace colpo dei soliti ignoti (1959) - Virgilio, 'Il milanese'
- Nel blu dipinto di blu (1959) - "Tre Stecche"
- La Dolce Vita (1960) - Riccardo
- The Loves of Salammbo (1960) - Hamilcar
- Gentlemen Are Born (1960) - Enzo
- The Warrior Empress (1960) - Hyperbio
- The Traffic Policeman (1960) - Il tenente dei vigili
- Madri pericolose (1960) - Count Massimo Soderini
- Girl with a Suitcase (1961) - Romolo
- Captain Fracasse (1961) - Lampourde
- Laura nuda (1961) - Alvise
- Cronache del '22 (1961)
- Day by Day, Desperately (1961) - Dottore
- Caccia all'uomo (1961) - Commissario Nardelli
- Cacciatori di dote (1961) - Manlio
- Fra' Manisco cerca guai (1961) - Don Liborio
- Pontius Pilate (1962) - Galba
- Peccati d'estate (1962) - Toni
- Eva (1962) - Michele - a player
- Swordsman of Siena (1962) - Don Carlos
- The Legion's Last Patrol (1962) - Paolo
- I Don Giovanni della Costa Azzurra (1962) - Protettore di Assuntina
- The Reunion (1963) - Sandrino
- Il successo (1963) - Ex fidanzato di Laura
- La pupa (1963) - Barone
- I terribili 7 (1963) - Giornalista
- Il treno del sabato (1964) - Riccardo
- Let's Talk About Women (1964)
- Amore facile (1964) - Carlo (segment "Una casa rispettabile")
- The Yellow Rolls-Royce (1964) - Bomba
- 2 mattacchioni al Moulin Rouge (1964) - Proprietario locale
- I due pericoli pubblici (1964) - Il Barone
- Terror-Creatures from the Grave (1965) - Joseph Morgan
- Two Sergeants of General Custer (1965) - Specialista
- I complessi (1965) - Alvaro Morandini (segment "Una Giornata decisiva")
- Idoli controluce (1965) - Arturo Baldi
- I soldi (1965)
- Spiaggia libera (1966) - Riccardo
- Deguejo (1966) - Foran
- Le voyage du père (1966) - Un voyageur
- Maigret a Pigalle (1966) - La Pointe
- Three Bites of the Apple (1967) - Croupier
- The Seventh Floor (1967) - The Barber
- How to Kill 400 Duponts (1967) - Vladimiro Dupont
- Bang Bang Kid (1967) - Killer Kossock
- Un colpo da re (1967) - Moulin Rouge
- Se vuoi vivere... spara! (1968) - Donovan
- The Killer Likes Candy (1968) - Nicolo
- Madigan's Millions (1968) - Matteo Cirini
- La vuole lui... lo vuole lei (1968) - Ferruccio
- I ragazzi di Bandiera Gialla (1968) - Pizzini, the Producer
- Il ragazzo che sorride (1969) - Father of Livia
- A Noose for Django (1969) - Mr. Fargo
- Oh, Grandmother's Dead (1969) - Galeazzo Ghia
- Death Knocks Twice (1969) - Amato Locatelli
- Pensando a te (1969)
- The Avenger, Zorro (1969) - Albert Pison
- How Did a Nice Girl Like You Get Into This Business? (1970) - Olivetti
- La colomba non deve volare (1970)
- Il divorzio (1970) - Umberto
- A Girl Called Jules (1970) - Carvalli
- A Man Called Sledge (1970) - The Warden
- Basta guardarla (1970) - Pediconi
- Mazzabubù... quante corna stanno quaggiù? (1971) - Agilulfo, the crusader
- Grazie zio, ci provo anch'io (1971) - Agente X-15
- Trastevere (1971) - Il produttore (scenes deleted)
- A Girl in Australia (1971) - Giuseppe Bartoni
- Siamo tutti in libertà provvisoria (1971)
- Cerco de terror (1972) - Doctor Warren
- Decameron proibitissimo (Boccaccio mio statte zitto) (1972) - Count Guidobaldo
- Naughty Nun (1972) - Giovanni Piccolomini
- Return of Halleluja (1972) - Zagaya
- Sting of the West (1972) - Sheriff
- What Am I Doing in the Middle of a Revolution? (1972) - Peppino
- Decameroticus (1972) - Gerbino
- Maria Rosa la guardona (1973)
- Giovannona Long-Thigh (1973) - Robertuzzo
- Rugantino (1973) - Il Principe
- Il figlioccio del padrino (1973) - Petruzzo
- 4 marmittoni alle grandi manovre (1974) - Tenente Spezzini
- Il bacio di una morta (1974) - On. Lampedusa
- Di Tresette ce n'è uno, tutti gli altri son nessuno (1974) - Frisco Joe / Tutti Frutti
- Scusi, si potrebbe evitare il servizio militare?... No! (1974)
- L'eredità dello zio buonanima (1974) - Notaio Potenza
- La mafia mi fa un baffo (1974) - Police Manager (uncredited)
- The Silkworm (1974) - Commissario Guarnieri
- Il fidanzamento (1975) - Vincenzo - brother of Luigi
- The Cursed Medallion (1975) - Police Inspector
- The Loves and Times of Scaramouche (1976) - Citoyen Capitain
- Confessions of a Lady Cop (1976) - Federico Innocenti, detto 'Borotalco
- La sposina (1976) - Arnaldi
- Campagnola bella (1976)
- Sins in the Country (1976) - Zito / Lawyer
- The Cynic, the Rat and the Fist (1977) - Natali
- La vergine, il toro e il capricorno (1977) - Enrica's Husband
- Rene the Cane (1977) - Karl
- The Cricket (1980) - Ermete
- Don't Play with Tigers (1982) - Admiral Olderisi
- Odd Squad (1983) - Tenente Rondi
- Vacanze di Natale (1983) - Giovanni Covelli
- Fantozzi subisce ancora (1983) - Ragionier Calboni
- Amarsi un po' (1984) - Principe Cellini
- Windsurf - Il vento nelle mani (1984) - Anacleto Stella
- My First Forty Years (1987)
- Paprika (1991) - Zio
- A Cold, Cold Winter (1996) - Avv. Rossi Mannelli
- Simpatici & antipatici (1998) - Fausto
- The Dinner (1998) - Diomede
- I fobici (1999) - Carlo's father (segment "Ho chiuso il gas?") (voice, uncredited)
- At the Right Moment (2000) - Direttore TG
- Padre Pio: Between Heaven and Earth (2000, TV Movie) - Eminenza
- Arresti domiciliari (2000)
- I Love You Eugenio (2002) - Maresciallo
- Amore 14 (2009) - Tommaso
- La città invisibile (2010) - Nonno Carmine
- La legge è uguale per tutti... forse (2014) - Barbone
