= Girls of Today (1955 film) =

1955 film

- Film poster
- Directed by: Luigi Zampa
- Written by: Luigi Zampa
- Produced by: Antonio Altoviti; Dino De Laurentiis; Carlo Ponti
- Starring: Marisa Allasio
- Cinematography: Enzo Serafin
- Edited by: Eraldo Da Roma
- Music by: Carlo Savina
- Release date: 1955
- Running time: 98 minutes
- Country: Italy
- Language: Italian

Girls of Today (Italian: Ragazze d'oggi) is a 1955 Italian comedy film directed by Luigi Zampa and starring Marisa Allasio and Lili Cerasoli.

== Plot ==
Peppino Bardellotti, a widower, lives in Milan from his modest job as a sales representative. He has four daughters, three of whom are of marriageable age, followed by his sister-in-law Matilde, who incites them to settle down by marrying a wealthy man, and two of the girls, Sofia and Tilde, following these exhortations initiate relationships with two wealthy men, or supposedly so. Anna, the third daughter, on the other hand, is engaged to Sandro, a simple airline employee who, because of his meager income and his more modern ideas about the role of women, is not well received by the family.

But the dreams of affluence pursued by the two girls shatter against a bitter reality. Sofia is deluded by her fiancé Mongardi, who first promises to marry her but then abandons her by yielding to the economic blackmail of her father, a wealthy industrialist opposed to marriage. Tilde will find herself caught up in the shady Armando's attempt to set her on the road to prostitution. They understand the illusion of having wanted to enter the cynical world of the rich and thus return, forgiven, to the family. Anna, on the other hand, rejects a possible road to success in the movies and marries Sandro, happily leaving with him for their honeymoon. Immediately before Anna's departure, Bardellotti has an interview with Mongardi the father, whose son has been estranged from him, working and showing maturity, and the industrialist wishes to make amends for his actions, and if still possible, reunite Sofia and his son.

== Cast ==
- Marisa Allasio as Anna Bardellotti
- Lili Cerasoli as Sofia Bardellotti
- Paolo Stoppa as Giuseppe Bardellotti
- Edoardo Bergamo as Mongardi jr.
- Armenia Balducci as Tilde Bardellotti
- Paola Quattrini as Simonetta Bardellotti
- Françoise Rosay as Innkeeper
- Louis Seigner as Mongardi
- Frank Villard as Armando
- Mike Bongiorno as Sandro
- Camillo Milli as Dr. Vannucci
- Bella Billa as Matilde
- Ada Colangeli as Filomena
- Antonio Acqua as Antiquarian
- Ugo Sasso as Juror
- Enzo Garinei as Juror
- Guido Celano
- Valeria Fabrizi
