= Susanna Whipped Cream =

- Directed by: Steno
- Written by: Marcello Marchesi; Vittorio Metz
- Starring: Marisa Allasio; Germán Cobos; Nino Manfredi; Alberto Bonucci; Bice Valori; Gianrico Tedeschi; Raffaele Pisu; Mario Carotenuto; Memmo Carotenuto; Nuto Navarrini; Sandra Mondaini
- Cinematography: Tonino Delli Colli
- Music by: Mario Gem
- Release date: 1957
- Running time: 90 minutes
- Countries: Italy; Spain
- Language: Italian

Susanna Whipped Cream (Italian: Susanna tutta panna, Spanish: Susana, pura nata) is a 1957 Italian-Spanish romantic comedy film directed by Steno.

== Cast ==
- Marisa Allasio: Susanna
- Germán Cobos: Alberto
- Mario Carotenuto: Alfredo Libotti
- Memmo Carotenuto: Scorcelletti the Younger
- Nino Manfredi: Romoletto, the thief
- Sandra Mondaini: Marisa Trombetti
- Gianni Agus: Trombetti
- Bice Valori: Rossella
- Alberto Bonucci: Massimo
- Gianrico Tedeschi: Gianluca
- Raffaele Pisu: Arturo
- Paolo Ferrari: Tao
- Gianni Bonagura: Milanesi
- Alberto Rabagliati: Commendatore Botta
- Nuto Navarrini: Palpiti
- Anna Campori: Susanna's mother
- Fernando Sancho: Aristide
- Luz Márquez: Maria Dolores
- Fanny Landini: Armida
- Francesco Mulé: Director
- Giulio Calì: Scorcelletti the Older
- Salvo Libassi: Roberto
- Giacomo Furia: Taxi driver from Naples
- Ignazio Leone: Taxi driver from Milan
- Loris Gizzi: Jeweler
- Ángel Aranda
- Ettore Manni

== Production ==
Steno shot the film back-to-back with the less successful Femmine tre volte, which shared most of its cast and crew. Principal cinematography started on February 1957. The theme song of the film is performed by Quartetto Cetra.
