= Oh! Sabella =

- Directed by: Dino Risi
- Written by: Pasquale Festa Campanile; Massimo Franciosa; Ettore Giannini; Dino Risi
- Cinematography: Tonino Delli Colli
- Music by: Michele Cozzoli
- Release date: 1957
- Country: Italy
- Language: Italian

La nonna Sabella (internationally released as Oh! Sabella) is a 1957 Italian comedy film directed by Dino Risi. It is based on the novel of the same name written by Pasquale Festa Campanile. The film won the Golden Shell at the San Sebastián International Film Festival. It was followed by La nipote Sabella.

== Synopsis ==
Raphaël, a young engineer, returns to his native village at the bedside of his dying grandmother, Isabelle. This one is actually doing wonderfully, it was a ruse to get her grandson back because she wants to see him marry a rich heiress, Evelyne. Raphaël bends to his desire and woos Evelyne, but he is much more attracted to the seductive Lucie, a childhood friend. Despite the money and Isabelle's opposition, he ends up marrying Lucie.

== Reception ==
In the magazine Cinema Nuovo, an anonymous review commented that "the film manages to sustain itself throughout the first half, thanks above all to a screenplay which (despite being less quick than that of Poveri ma belli), does not lack tasty ideas and guessed skits"

"The film would like to be a pleasant little picture of the province and show in a humorous key certain situations caught in reality. The screenwriters and director have also trod the hand, filling the story with commonplaces. The acting, especially that of Rascel in a parish priest, is affected by this heaviness of hand. Good photography."

== Cast ==
- Tina Pica as Grandma Sabella
- Peppino De Filippo as Emilio Mescogliano
- Sylva Koscina as Lucia
- Renato Salvatori as Raffaele Renzullo
- Rossella Como as Evelina Mancuso
- Paolo Stoppa as Evaristo Mancuso
- Dolores Palumbo as Carmela Renzullo
- Renato Rascel as Don Gregorio
- Mimo Billi as Eusebio
- Gina Mascetti as Clotilde
- Nino Vingelli
