= Renato Salvatori =

Italian actor (1933–1988)

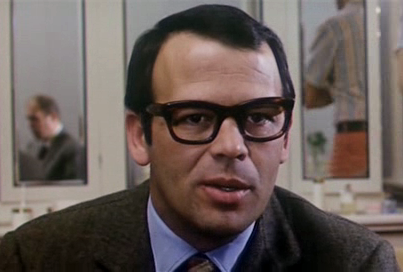
- Salvatori in L'Harem (1967)
- Born: 20 March 1933; Seravezza, Kingdom of Italy
- Died: 27 March 1988 (aged 55); Rome, Italy
- Occupation: Actor
- Years active: 1952–1981
- Spouse: Annie Girardot (m. 1962)

Renato Salvatori (20 March 1933 – 27 March 1988) was an Italian actor.

Born in Seravezza, Province of Lucca, Salvatori began his career in his teens playing juvenile, romantic roles. After working with directors such as Luchino Visconti, Roberto Rossellini and Vittorio De Sica, he developed into one of Italy's strongest character actors.

He met French actress Annie Girardot on the set of the film Rocco and His Brothers (1960) and married her on 6 January 1962. They had a daughter, Giulia; later the couple separated but never divorced.

Salvatori died in Rome of liver cirrhosis on 27 March 1988.

== Selected filmography ==
- Three Girls from Rome (1952) – Augusto Terenzi
- The Three Pirates (1952) – Il Corsaro Rosso – Rolando di Ventimiglia
- Good Folk's Sunday (1953) – Giulio
- Jolanda, the Daughter of the Black Corsair (1953) – Ralf, figlio di Morgan
- What Scoundrels Men Are! (1953) – Carletto
- Public Opinion (1954) – Mario
- The Virtuous Bigamist (1956) – Gino – le frère de Maria
- Poor, But Handsome (1957) – Salvatore
- Husbands in the City (1957) – Mario
- Pretty But Poor (1957) – Salvatore
- Oh! Sabella (1957) – Raffaele Rizzullo
- Big Deal on Madonna Street (1958) – Mario Angeletti
- Mogli pericolose (1958) – Federico Carpi
- ...And the Wild Wild Women (1959) – Piero
- Poor Millionaires (1959) – Salvatore
- Policarpo (1959) – Mario Marchetti
- Winter Holidays (1959) – Gianni
- The Magliari (1959) – Mario Balducci
- Audace colpo dei soliti ignoti (1959) – Mario Angeletti
- Vento del sud (1959) – Antonio Spagara
- Escape by Night (1960) – Renato Balducci
- Rocco and His Brothers (1960) – Simone Parondi
- Two Women (1960) – Florindo, il camionista (uncredited)
- A Day for Lionhearts (1961) – Orlando
- Disorder (1962) – Mario
- Smog (1962) – Mario Scarpelli
- Two Are Guilty (1963) – François Corbier
- The Shortest Day (1963) – Soldier
- Omicron (1963) – Omicron / Angelo
- La banda Casaroli (1963) – Paolo Casaroli
- The Organizer (1963) – Raoul
- Three Nights of Love (1964) – Nicola (segment "La vedova")
- The Reckless (1965) – Ettore Zambrini
- How to Seduce a Playboy (1966) – Boy Schock
- Her Harem (1967) – Gaetano
- Z (1969) – Yago
- Burn! (1969) – Teddy Sanchez
- The Light at the Edge of the World (1971) – Montefiore
- The Burglars (1971) – Renzi
- Indian Summer (1972) – Marcello
- State of Siege (1972) – Captain Lopez
- Au rendez-vous de la mort joyeuse (1972) – Henri
- The Burned Barns (1973) – The Hôtelier
- A Brief Vacation (1973) – Franco Mataro, the husband
- The Suspect (1975) – Gavino Pintus
- Flic Story (1975) – Mario Poncini
- The Gypsy (1975) – Jo Amila, dit "Jo le boxeur"
- Illustrious Corpses (1976) – Police commissary
- Live Like a Cop, Die Like a Man (1976) – Pasquini
- The Last Woman (1976) – Rene
- Todo modo (1976) – Dr. Scalambri
- Origins of the Mafia (1976) – Captain
- Armaguedon (1977) – Albert, called 'Einstein'
- Ernesto (1979) – Cesc
- La Luna (1979) – Communist
- Oggetti smarriti (1980) – Davide
- The Cricket (1980) – Carburo
- Asso (1981) – Bretella
- Tragedy of a Ridiculous Man (1981) – Colonel (final film role)

== Sources ==
- Gierut, Lodovico; Guidi, Umberto; Santucci, Anselmo (2007). Renato Salvatori: il povero ma bello che volle farsi attore. Bulzoni. ISBN 978-88-7870-206-6.
- Riazzoli, Mirko (2017). A Chronology of the Cinema Volume 1 From the pioneers to 1960. Youcanprint. ISBN 978-88-926-8548-2.
