= Fathers and Sons (1957 film) =

1957 film

- Film poster
- Directed by: Mario Monicelli
- Written by: Leonardo Benvenuti; Luigi Emmanuele; Agenore Incrocci; Mario Monicelli; Furio Scarpelli
- Produced by: Guido Giambartolomei
- Starring: Vittorio De Sica
- Cinematography: Leonida Barboni
- Edited by: Otello Colangeli; Mario Serandrei
- Music by: Alessandro Cicognini
- Distributed by: Cineriz
- Release date: 21 February 1957
- Running time: 99 minutes
- Country: Italy
- Language: Italian

Fathers and Sons (Italian: Padri e figli... and also known as A Tailor's Maid) is a 1957 Italian comedy film directed by Mario Monicelli. The film comically depicts the joys and sorrows in five Roman families over several months. At the 7th Berlin International Film Festival Monicelli won the Silver Bear for Best Director award.

== Plot ==
In Italy, in the 1950s, the lives of five families intersect. Vincenzo Corallo is a widowed tailor who has no control over his teenager daughter, Marcella, who skips school to go with her boyfriend, Sandro Bacci, to watch trials. Vincenzo's son, Carlo, is the master of the family who can't stand his sister's bad manners and wants to put her back on the right track.

At the Baccis, the father, Vittorio, has problems with his eldest son, Vezio.

In the same building, Guido and Giula Blasi are expecting their first child. Anxious, Guido contacts a nurse, Ines Santarelli, who offers him injections for his pregnant wife.

Ines Santarelli, married to a zookeeper, is the overworked mother of five children. She entrusts a sick son of theirs to her sister Rita, happy to welcome him, because she cannot have children with her husband Cesare.

== Cast ==
- Vittorio De Sica - Vincenzo Corallo
- Lorella De Luca - Marcella Corallo
- Riccardo Garrone - Carlo Corallo
- Marcello Mastroianni - Cesare
- Fiorella Mari - Rita
- Franco Interlenghi - Guido Blasi
- Antonella Lualdi - Giulia Blasi
- Memmo Carotenuto - Amerigo Santarelli
- Marisa Merlini - Ines Santarelli
- Ruggero Marchi - Vittorio Bacci
- Emma Baron - Mrs. Bacci
- Gabriele Antonini - Sandro Bacci
- Franco Di Trocchio - Alvaruccio
- Raffaele Pisu - Vezio Bacci
