= Le schiave di Cartagine =

The Sword and the Cross
- Theatrical release poster
- Directed by: Guido Brignone
- Screenplay by: Francesco De Feo; Mario Guerra; Nicola Manzari; Francesco Thellung; Duccio Tessari
- Story by: Francesco De Feo; Mario Guerra; Nicola Manzari; Francesco Thellung
- Produced by: Gregorio Walerstein
- Starring: Gianna Maria Canale; Jorge Mistral; Marisa Allasio; Ana Luisa Peluffo
- Cinematography: Bitto Albertini
- Edited by: Jolanda Benvenuti
- Music by: Enzo Masetti
- Production companies: Cinematográfica Filmex SA (Mexico); Società Italiana Cines (Italy); Yago Films (Spain)
- Release dates: 12 November 1956 (Italy); 21 September 1957 (Spain); 22 December 1959 (West Germany)
- Running time: 97 minutes (Italy)
- Countries: Italy; Mexico; Spain

The Sword and the Cross (Italian: Le schiave di Cartagine) is a 1956 sword and sandal film directed by Guido Brignone starring Gianna Maria Canale, Jorge Mistral, Marisa Allasio and Ana Luisa Peluffo. The film, a coproduction between Italy, Spain, and Mexico, was and shot in widescreen (Cinetotalscope) in Italian in Cinecittà, Rome.

Set in Tarsus, in the Roman province of Cilicia, 120 CE, the plot follows two Christian sisters who are sold as slaves in a story of love, vengeance, religious persecution, and martyrdom.

== Plot ==
Beautiful and proud, Julia Marcia, is the spoiled daughter of Julius Tiberius, the Roman Proconsul of the province of Cilicia in the city of Tarsus. Julia's ailing father wants to betroth her to Flavius Metellus, a member of the Senate who is in love with her. This would leave Julia's future settle and Flavius could succeed his future father in law as governor of the province. However, Julia is reluctant to comply with her father's wishes. She is in love, but unrequited, with her friend the tribune Marco Valerio. While together on an excursion through town, Julia and Marcus come across to an auction where two sisters of Carthaginian origin are sold as slaves. Marco is immediately smitten with the blond sister, Lea, while his friend, Tullius, a Roman soldier, is attracted to the other sister, Esther, a brunette. These beautiful and educated slaves command a high asking price so Marco Valerio buys the sisters for Julia Marcia who pays for the transaction.

During a dinner party at her father's opulent palace in Tarsus, Julia Marcia has Lea sung for her guest, but her Carthaginian aria displeases Julia who orders Lea to be harshly punished. Marco Valerio's obvious interest in Lea's beauty and sweetness drives Julia to cruelty. She orders her main servant, Afra, herself a former slave, to lash Lea frequently. Meanwhile, Esther is befriended by a fellow slave, Stephen, who is a Christian like the two sisters. Gradually, Esther and Stephen fall in love.

The greedy and unscrupulous chief treasurer, Publio Cornelio, plots in the Senate to conquer power. With this aim, he convinces the weak-minded Flavius Metellus to assassinate the proconsul and accuse the Christians of the crime leaving a cross on the scene to implicate them. The plan succeeds. After her father's assassination, Julia Marcia, in order to maintain her status and fortune, marries Flavio Metello, the new proconsul. Believing the Christians were responsible for her father's death, Julia orders to persecute them. This is not a difficult task as most of them are already slaves. The Christian, including Lea, Esther, and Stephen are arrested and sent to forced labor in the mills. Marco Valerio is ordered to carry out the campaign of persecuting the Christian, but he is soon convinced of their innocence as his friendship with the pious Lea allows him to see their courage and faith. After trying to defend them before the senate, Marco is forced to flee. The Christian are sent to the dungeons waiting to be put to death. Furious of Marco's escape, Julia Marcia interrogates Lea about his whereabouts. Lea actually does not know where he is. In revenge, Julia orders Lea to be blinded by a white-hot sword.

Marco Valerio finds refuge with fellow soldiers on abandoned caves outside the city and through his friend, Tullius rally up his supporters in the region including the powerful Praetor Licinius and the senators Faustus Domitius and Horace Tiberius. They all plan to remove Flavius Metellus and the corrupt Publio Cornelio from power taking the city military from two sides. They agree to finance the plan. However, Marco Valerio is arrested after a shepherd reveals his location. He joins the two sisters and the Christian in the dungeons. He is outraged finding that Lea is now blind. Esther and Stephen are married in the dungeon by their deacon but all Christian are sentenced to death. They are going to be crucified on the hill and then burned alive.

Marco Valerio is freed by his supporters headed by his friend Tullius. In the bloody battle that follows Marco rescues Lea from the crux but while freeing Esther, Tullios is killed by an arrow. Julia Marcia and her husband, Flavius Metellus try to flee with their lives, but in her escape, Julia falls and is being trampled to death by the horses. Publio Cornelio, very unpopular for raising taxes, is killed when he arrives in the city. Marco Valerio and Flavio Metolius face each other on a chariot race by the beach where hero and villain fight it out to the death on the sands. During the duel, Flavio admitting his guilt, and to expiate his crime, stabs himself with Marco's dagger. Lea and Marco are married and Christianity becomes accepted.

== Cast ==
- Gianna Maria Canale as Julia Marcia
- Jorge Mistral as Marcus Valerius
- Marisa Allasio as Lea
- Ana Luisa Peluffo as Esther
- Rubén Rojo as Flavius Metellus
- Luigi Pavese as Publius Cornelius
- Germán Cobos as Tullius
- Nando Tamberlani as Proconsul Julius Tiberius
- Albert Hehn as Senator Livius Catulus
- Emilio Petacci as Julio Severo
- Nietta Zocchi as Afra
- Marcello Giorda as The deacon
- Carlo Lombardi as Senator Licinius
- Renato Navarrini as Senator Faustus Domitius
- Ugo Sasso as Fulvio
- Edoardo Toniolo as Horace Tiberius
- Ricardo Valle as Octavius
- Vinicio Sofia as the Merchant of slaves

== Release ==
The film was released in Italy on 12 November 1956 in Italy and on 21 September 1957 in Spain. It was released in France as Under the Sign of the Cross and in the United States under the name The Sword and the Cross in April 1960.
