= The Most Wonderful Moment =

1957 film

- Film poster
- Directed by: Luciano Emmer
- Written by: Sergio Amidei; Luciano Emmer; Glauco Pellegrini; Ugo Pirro; Vasco Pratolini
- Produced by: Giorgio Agliani
- Starring: Marcello Mastroianni; Giovanna Ralli; Marisa Merlini
- Cinematography: Luciano Trasatti
- Edited by: Jolanda Benvenuti
- Music by: Nino Rota
- Release date: 21 March 1957
- Running time: 92 minutes
- Country: Italy
- Language: Italian

The Most Wonderful Moment (Italian: Il momento più bello) is a 1957 Italian drama film directed by Luciano Emmer.

This drama deals with natural childbirth, and was described as "clinically pure, informative, edifying and, on occasion, tenderly dramatic". Pietro is in love with a nurse; they keep their affair secret until she falls pregnant. Worried that marriage will affect his career, she prepares for the upcoming childbirth.

== Plot ==
In the maternity ward of a large Roman hospital, we witness the secret love between the young doctor Pietro Valeri and the nurse Luisa Morelli. Pietro has difficulty in making a career and hesitates to marry Luisa as he does not know what future he could offer her.

The situation seems to get worse when Luisa realizes she is expecting a baby. Pietro, always irresolute, seems to be in favor of a clandestine abortion, a solution that the girl refuses to consider. Luisa leaves the hospital and moves to her former colleague Margherita, who has set up on her own as a midwife. Margherita and Luisa organize pre-baby courses in which a revolutionary method of painless childbirth is developed, a technique learned in the same hospital where they worked. One of the young women assisted by Margherita is hospitalized in the ward where Pietro works and actually manages to give birth in conditions of relative serenity, transforming what mothers always considered "the worst moment" into the “most beautiful moment”: the episode comforts the doctor, who finally decides to marry Luisa and assist her in her maternity leave.

== Cast ==
- Marcello Mastroianni as Pietro Valeri
- Giovanna Ralli as Luisa Morelli
- Marisa Merlini as Margherita Rosati
- Bice Valori as Carla
- Memmo Carotenuto as Ticket collector
- Ernesto Calindri as Director of clinic
- Riccardo Garrone as Dr. Benvenuti
- Emilio Cigoli as Morelli
- Giuliano Montaldo as Don Grazini
- Sergio Bergonzelli as Mister Mancini
- Vittorio André as Prof. Grimaldi (as Victor André)
- Clara Bindi as Matilde Fontana
- Edda Soligo as Head of home
