= Poor Millionaires (1959 film) =

- Directed by: Dino Risi
- Produced by: Titanus
- Cinematography: Tonino Delli Colli
- Music by: Armando Trovajoli
- Release date: 1959
- Country: Italy
- Language: Italian

Poor Millionaires (Italian: Poveri milionari) is a 1959 Italian comedy film directed by Dino Risi. It is the final chapter in the trilogy started with Poveri ma belli.

== Cast ==
- Maurizio Arena: Romolo
- Renato Salvatori: Salvatore
- Alessandra Panaro: Anna Maria
- Lorella De Luca: Marisa
- Sylva Koscina: Alice
- Memmo Carotenuto: Alvaro
- Gildo Bocci: Sor Nerone
- Roberto Rey: Psichiatra
- Lina Ferri: Sora Cecilia
- Fred Buscaglione: himself
