= The Black Devil (film) =

1957 film

- Directed by: Sergio Grieco
- Written by: Ottavio Poggi; Sergio Grieco
- Cinematography: Alvaro Mancori
- Music by: Roberto Nicolosi
- Release date: 1957
- Country: Italy
- Language: Italian

The Black Devil (Italian: Il diavolo nero) is a 1957 Italian adventure film written and directed by Sergio Grieco.

== Plot ==
In 1525, the nobleman Lorenzo di Roccabruna tries to establish a union between Italians and Spaniards through the marriage of his niece Isabella of Spain with King Ferdinand of Aragon. Nevertheless, the people of Roquebrune disagree and attack the Spaniards under the command of a mysterious masked man known as "The Black Devil".

== Cast ==
- Gérard Landry: Osvaldo de' Marzi
- Milly Vitale: Isabella
- Nadia Gray: Duchess Lucrezia
- Maurizio Arena: Ruggero
- Leonora Ruffo: Stella
- Andrea Aureli: Lorenzo di Roccabruna
- Nino Crisman: Don Pedro
