= Poor, But Handsome =

- Directed by: Dino Risi
- Written by: Dino Risi; Pasquale Festa Campanile; Massimo Franciosa
- Produced by: Silvio Clementelli
- Starring: Marisa Allasio; Maurizio Arena; Renato Salvatori
- Cinematography: Tonino Delli Colli
- Music by: Giorgio Fabor; Piero Piccioni
- Release date: 1957 (Italy)
- Running time: 101 min.
- Language: Italian

Poor, But Handsome (Italian: Poveri ma belli) is a 1957 Italian comedy film directed by Dino Risi.

There have been two sequels, also directed by Risi and starring Marisa Allasio, Maurizio Arena and Renato Salvatori: Pretty But Poor in 1957 and Poor Millionaires in 1959 (the latter not featuring Allasio, who by then had retired from acting).

In 2008, the film was included on the Italian Ministry of Cultural Heritage’s 100 Italian films to be saved, a list of 100 films that "have changed the collective memory of the country between 1942 and 1978."

== Plot ==
Romolo (Maurizio Arena) and Salvatore (Renato Salvatori) are two young men who are neighbors and friends. They live in Piazza Navona in Rome. They are poor but handsome, and both fall in love with the beautiful Giovanna (Marisa Allasio).

After having briefly flirted in quick succession with both friends (a situation which severely strains their feelings of comradeship), Giovanna realizes she's still in love with Ugo, her previous boyfriend, and returns with him. Romolo and Salvatore, their friendship recovered, ultimately get simultaneously engaged with each other's sister.

== Cast ==
- Marisa Allasio: Giovanna
- Maurizio Arena: Romolo
- Renato Salvatori: Salvatore
- Lorella De Luca: Marisa
- Alessandra Panaro: Anna Maria
- Memmo Carotenuto: Alvaro
- Mario Carotenuto: Uncle Mario
- Virgilio Riento: father of Giovanna
- Ettore Manni: Ugo
- Rossella Como: Ugo's current girlfriend
- Aldo Valletti
- Nino Vingelli
- Erminio Spalla
