= Paolo Ferrari (actor) =

Italian actor (1929–2018)

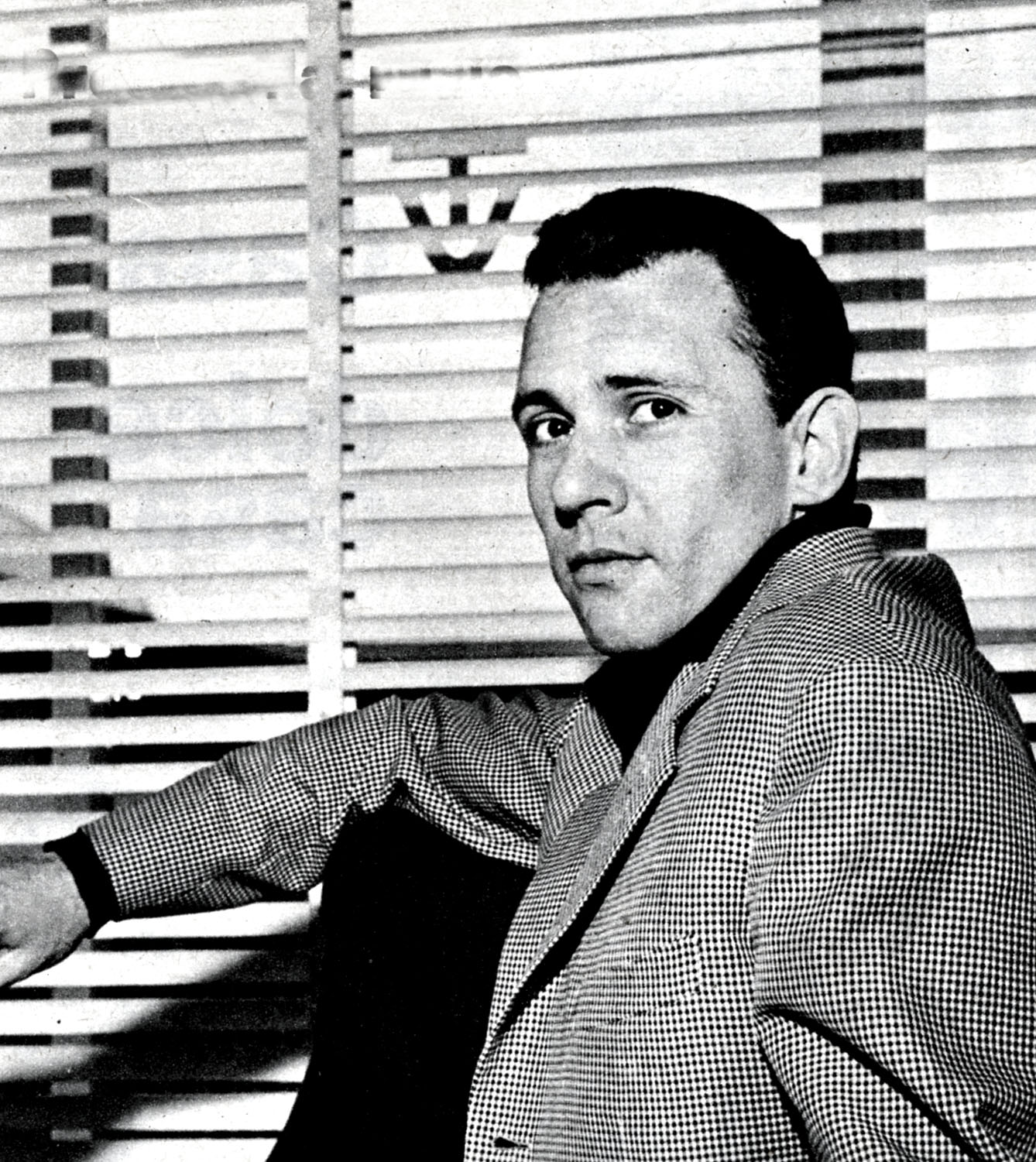
- Ferrari in 1961
- Born: 26 February 1929; Brussels, Belgium
- Died: 6 May 2018 (aged 89); Monterotondo, Italy
- Occupations: Actor; voice actor; television presenter
- Years active: 1938–2018
- Height: 1.70 m (5 ft 7 in)
- Spouses: Marina Bonfigli (m. 1956; div. 19??); Laura Tavanti (m. 1970)
- Children: 3, including Fabio Ferrari

Paolo Ferrari (26 February 1929 – 6 May 2018) was an Italian actor, voice actor and television presenter.

== Biography ==
Ferrari was born in Brussels as his father was at the time the Italian consul in the Belgian Congo, and was in Belgium for a diplomatic mission. His mother, Giulietta, was a concert pianist. He made his acting debut at 9 years old, in Alessandro Blasetti's Ettore Fieramosca and he appeared in over 45 films between 1938 and 2018. He became first known as "the balilla Paolo", a character he played in numerous radio programs for children and teenagers during the fascist era. After the war he studied at the Silvio d’Amico Academy of Dramatic Arts.

Ferrari died in Monterotondo on 6 May 2018, at the age of 89.

== Selected filmography ==
- Kean (1940)
- Odessa in Flames (1942)
- Laugh, Pagliacci (1943)
- Toto Seeks Peace (1954)
- Laugh! Laugh! Laugh! (1954)
- Susanna Whipped Cream (1957)
- Legs of Gold (1958)
- Le signore (1960)
- Akiko (1961)
- I Don Giovanni della Costa Azzurra (1962)
- White Voices (1964)
- Lo scippo (1965)
- Pronto... c'è una certa Giuliana per te (1967)
- A Man for Emmanuelle (1969)
- Once a Year, Every Year (1994)
