= Dino Risi =

Italian film director (1916–2008)

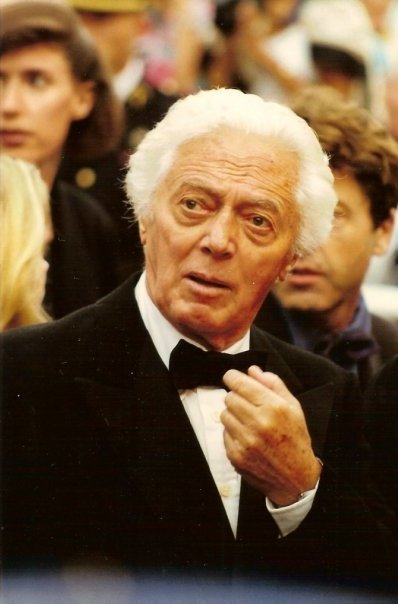
- Risi at the 1993 Cannes Film Festival
- Born: 23 December 1916; Milan, Kingdom of Italy
- Died: 7 June 2008 (aged 91); Rome, Italy
- Occupation: Film director
- Years active: 1946–2002
- Awards: 1976: César Award for Best Foreign Film for Scent of a Woman

Dino Risi (23 December 1916 – 7 June 2008) was an Italian film director. With Mario Monicelli, Luigi Comencini, Nanni Loy, and Ettore Scola, he was one of the masters of commedia all'italiana.

== Biography ==
Risi was born in Milan. He had an uncle, Fernando Risi, a cinematographer, and a younger brother, Nelo (1920–2015), a director and writer. At the age of twelve, Risi became an orphan and was looked after by relatives and friends of his family. He graduated from the Faculty of Medicine and Surgery at the University of Milan, but refused to pursue a career as a psychiatrist, as his family had wished.

Risi started his career in cinema as an assistant director to cinema figures such as Mario Soldati and Alberto Lattuada. Later he began directing his own films and was credited with giving early opportunities to future acting stars such as Sophia Loren and Vittorio Gassman. His 1966 film Treasure of San Gennaro was entered into the 5th Moscow International Film Festival where it won a Silver Prize.

His biggest hits were Poor, But Handsome (Poveri ma belli), followed by two sequels, which he also directed; A Difficult Life (Una vita difficile); The Easy Life (Il sorpasso); Opiate '67 or, in a cut version, 15 From Rome (I Mostri); and Scent of a Woman (Profumo di Donna), which was remade by Martin Brest starring Al Pacino in 1992.

In 2002, he was awarded the Golden Lion – Honorary Award (Leone d'oro alla carriera) at the Venice Film Festival for his lifetime work. Two of his films, Il giovedì and Il commissario Lo Gatto, were shown in a retrospective section on Italian comedy at the 67th Venice International Film Festival.

He died on 7 June 2008 at his residence in Rome. He was 91 and was survived by two children, Claudio Risi (1948–2020) and Marco Risi (1951), both film directors.

== Filmography ==
- Verso la vita (1946)
- Tigullio minore (1947)
- 1848 (1948)
- Vacation with a Gangster (1952)
- Il viale della speranza (1953)
- Love in the City (segment: "Paradiso per 4 ore", 1953)
- The Sign of Venus (1955)
- Scandal in Sorrento (1955)
- Poor, But Handsome (1956)
- Oh! Sabella (1957)
- Pretty But Poor (1957)
- Venice, the Moon and You (1959)
- Il vedovo (1959)
- Poor Millionaires (1959)
- Love and Larceny (1959)
- Love in Rome (1960)
- Behind Closed Doors (1961)
- A Difficult Life (1961)
- The Easy Life (1962)
- March on Rome (1962)
- The Thursday (1963)
- I mostri (1963)
- The Dolls (segment: "La telefonata", 1965)
- The Gaucho (1965)
- I complessi (segment: "Una giornata decisiva", 1965)
- Weekend, Italian Style (1966)
- Our Husbands (segment: "Il marito di Attilia", 1966)
- Treasure of San Gennaro (1966)
- The Tiger and the Pussycat (1967)
- Torture Me But Kill Me with Kisses (1968)
- Mr. Kinky (1968)
- I See Naked (1969)
- Normal Young Man (1969)
- In the Name of the Italian People (1971)
- The Priest's Wife (1971)
- That's How We Women Are (1971)
- Mordi e fuggi (1973)
- How Funny Can Sex Be? (1973)
- Scent of a Woman (1974)
- The Career of a Chambermaid (1976)
- The Forbidden Room (1977)
- The Bishop's Bedroom (1977)
- I nuovi mostri (segments: "Con i saluti degli amici", "Tantum ergo", "Pornodiva", "Mammina mammona" and "Senza parole", 1978)
- First Love (1978)
- Dear Father (1979)
- I'm Photogenic (1980)
- Sunday Lovers (segment: "Roma", 1980)
- Fantasma d'amore (1981)
- Sesso e volentieri (1982)
- ...e la vita continua (TV, 1984)
- Good King Dagobert (1984)
- Madman at War (1985)
- Teresa (1987)
- Il commissario Lo Gatto (1987)
- Il vizio di vivere (TV, 1989)
- I'll Be Going Now (1990)
- Vita coi figli (TV, 1990)
- Giovani e belli (1996)
- Esercizi di stile (segment: "Myriam", 1996)
