= Ugo Pagliai =

Italian actor and voice actor (born 1937)

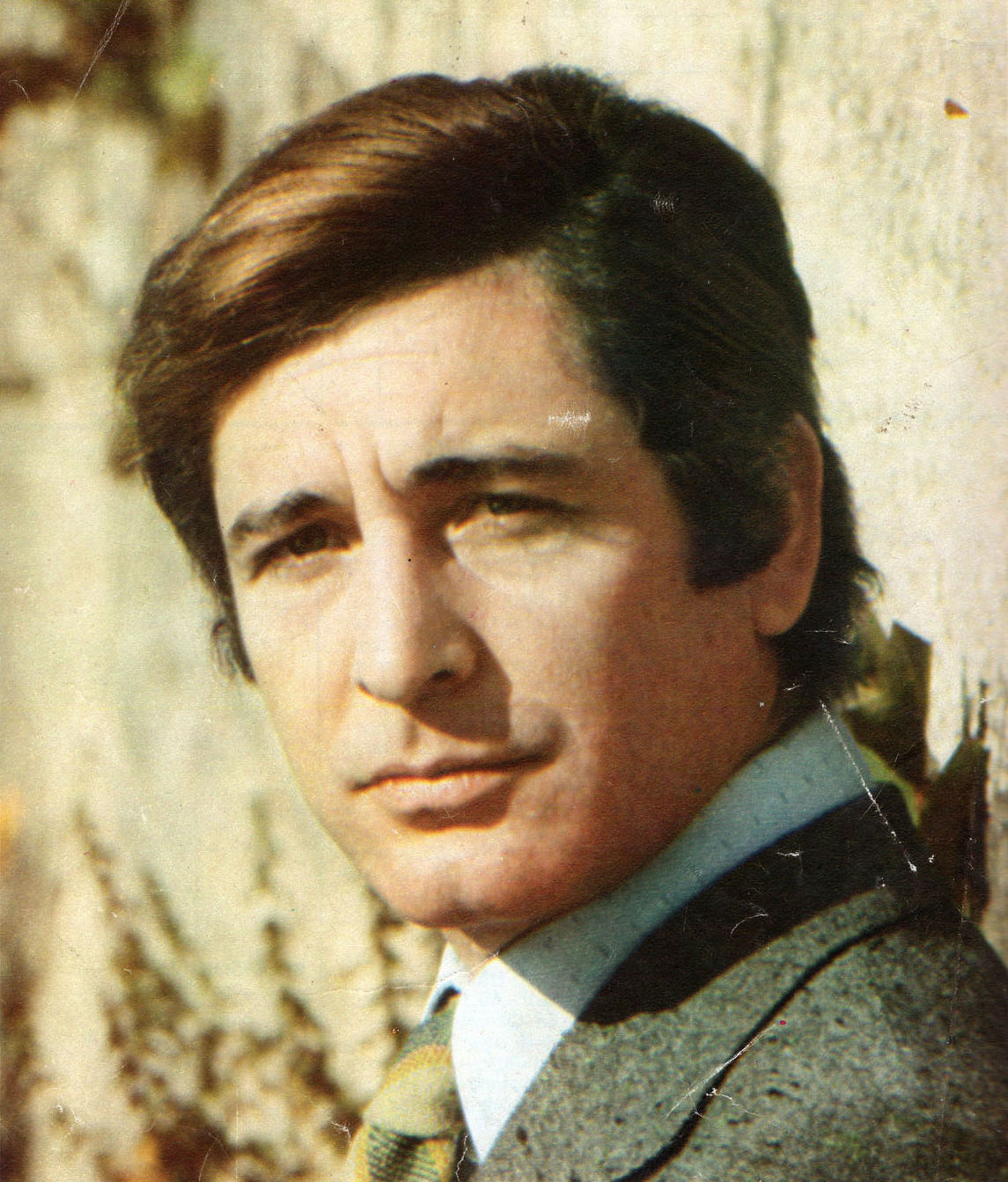
- Pagliai, c. 1975
- Born: 13 November 1937 (age 88); Pistoia, Italy
- Occupations: Actor, voice actor
- Years active: 1963–present
- Partner: Paola Gassman (1973–2024; her death)
- Children: 1

Ugo Pagliai (born 13 November 1937) is an Italian actor and voice actor.

== Life and career ==
In 1958, Pagliai enrolled at the Accademia Nazionale d'Arte Drammatica, starting his career on stage in the early 1960s. He became first known in 1969, thanks to the Giuseppe Fina's critically acclaimed stage play, Ross.

In 1971, he had a major success as the lead actor of the Daniele D'Anza's miniseries, Il segno del comando, and then appeared in a number of other successful RAI TV-series, often directed by D'Anza. He was mainly active onstage, often with his partner, Paola Gassman, the daughter of actors Vittorio Gassman and Nora Ricci. In 1988, Pagliai received a Flaiano Prize for his career.

== Selected filmography ==
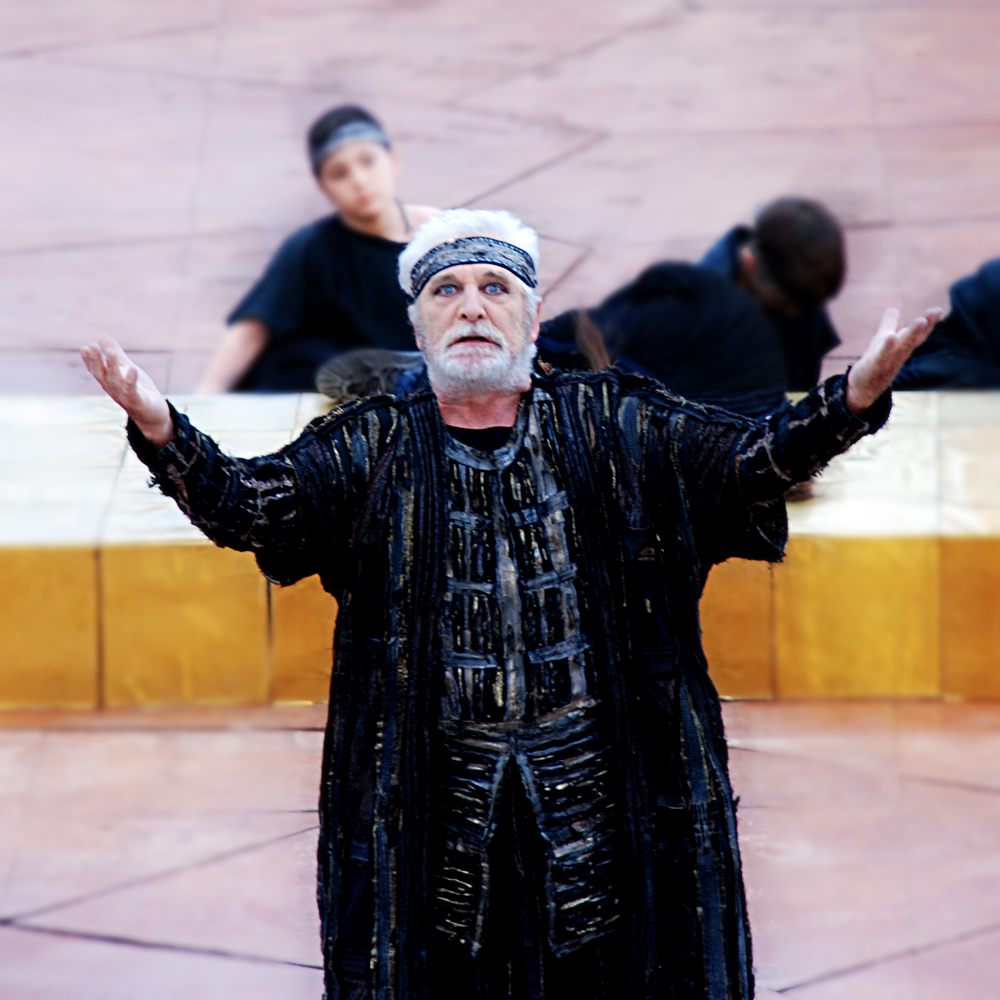
Pagliai performing at the Greek Theatre of Syracuse in 2007

- I complessi (1963) – Failed Applicant (segment "Guglielmo il Dentone") (uncredited)
- Da Berlino l'apocalisse (1967)
- Jerk à Istambul (1967) – Ralph
- Heads or Tails (1969) – Burton
- O Cangaceiro (1970) – Vincenzo Helfen
- Guardami nuda (1972) – Carlo
- The Red Queen Kills Seven Times (1972) – Martin Hoffmann
- La ragazza dalla pelle di luna (1974) – Alberto
- Till Marriage Do Us Part (1974) – Ruggero di Maqueda
- Nuits Rouges (1974) – Paul de Borrego
- Di padre in figlio (1982) – Himself
- Fatal Frames – Fotogrammi mortali (1996) – Commissioner Valenti
- Bagnomaria (1999) – The Mayor
- I giorni dell'amore e dell'odio (2001) – Ten. Col. Barge
- Father of Mercy (2004) – Cardinal Schuster
- Family Game (2007) – Prof. Moroni
- Cars 3 (2017) – Doc Hudson
- Loro (2018) – Mike Bongiorno
