= Paola Gassman =

Italian actress (1945–2024)

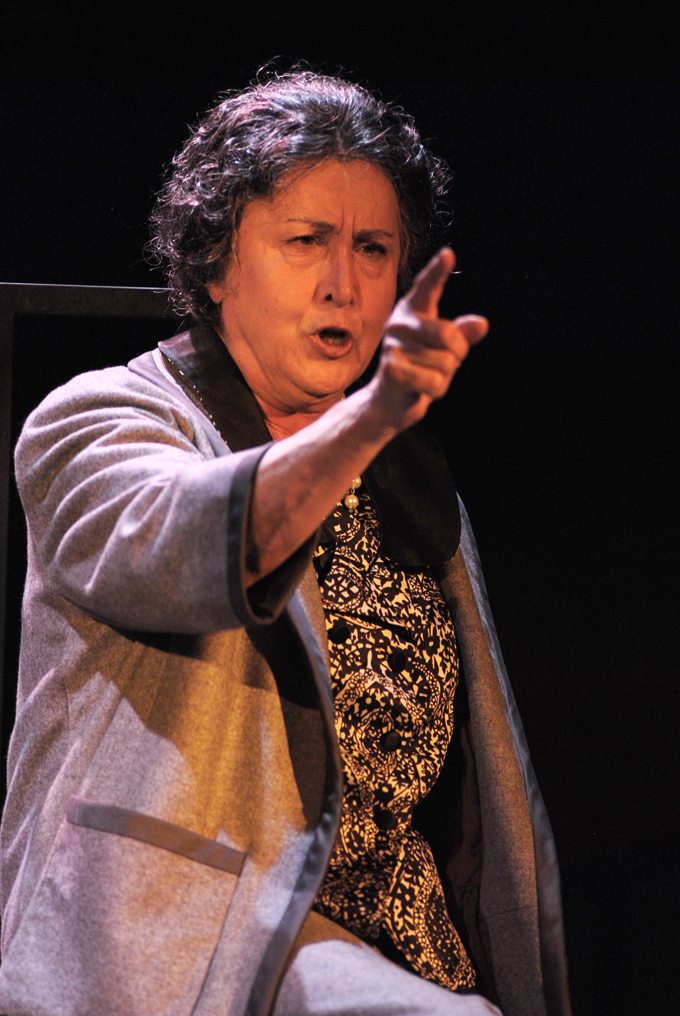
- Gassman in 2012
- Born: 29 June 1945; Milan, Italy
- Died: 9 April 2024 (aged 78); Rome, Italy
- Occupation: Actress
- Years active: 1965–2024
- Spouse: Luciano Virgilio (m. 1967; div. 1973)
- Partner: Ugo Pagliai (1973–2024)
- Children: 2
- Parents: Vittorio Gassman (father); Nora Ricci (mother)
- Relatives: Renzo Ricci (grandfather); Margherita Bagni (grandmother); Alessandro Gassmann (half-brother); Leo Gassmann (half-nephew)

Paola Gassman (29 June 1945 – 9 April 2024) was an Italian actress.

== Biography ==
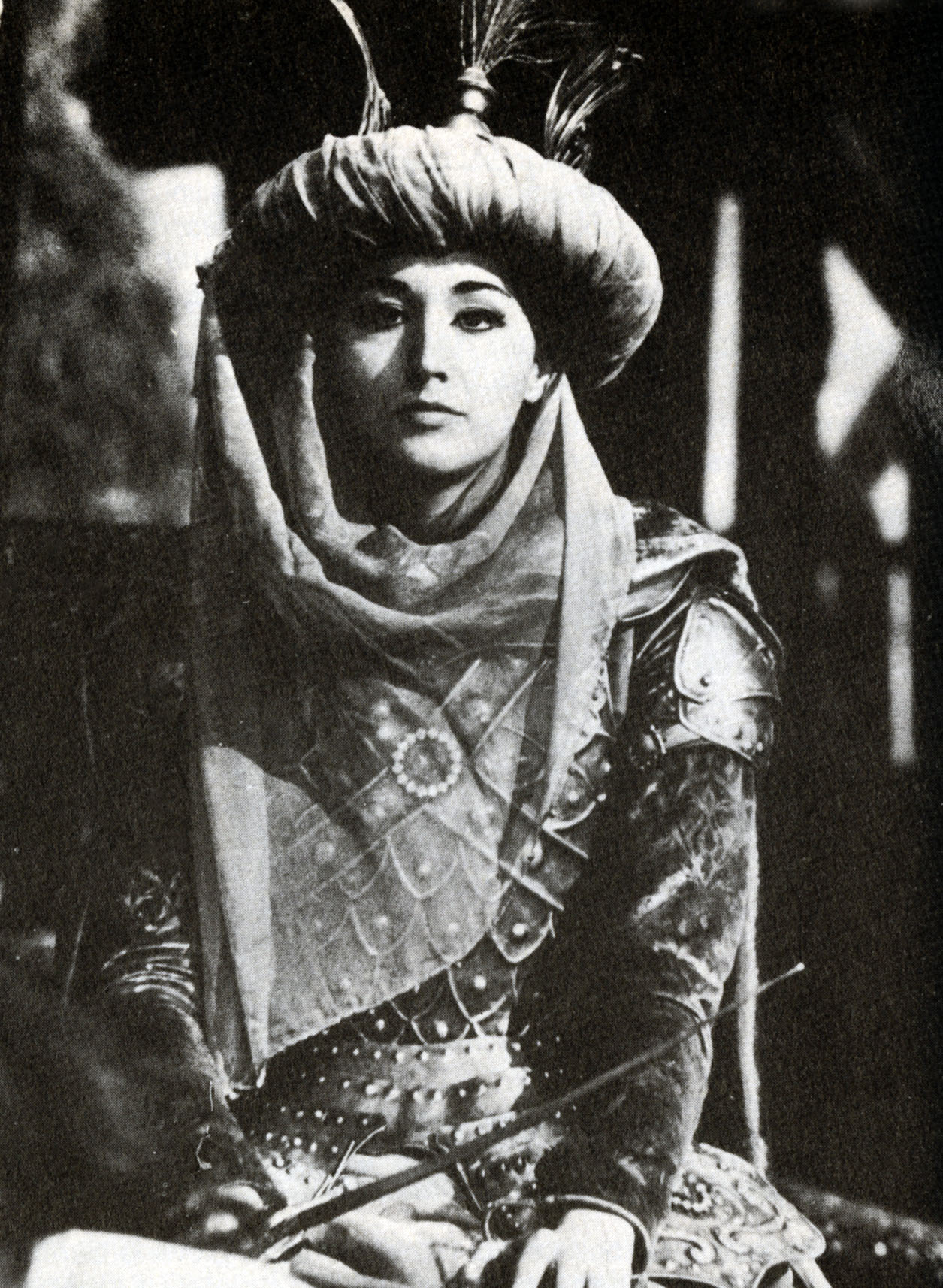
Gassman in the TV miniseries Orlando furioso, 1975

Through her mother, Nora Ricci, Paola Gassman was a fifth generation actor, as Ricci was the daughter of actors Renzo Ricci and Margherita Bagni.

Gassman devoted herself almost exclusively to the theater, with the exception of some sporadic but significant television appearances in comedies and scripts. At the beginning of her career she spent three years in the Milan company Teatro Libero, directed by Luca Ronconi. She performed in their show Orlando furioso, which toured in many European countries and in the United States before being adapted into a television series. Also during that period, she performed in the shows La tragedia del avengeratore and Cucina. She then joined the Brignone-Pagliai company, where she performed in Ibsen's Spectra and Fabbri's Family Process.

Gassman was directed by her father, Vittorio Gassman, onstage. With the theatrical company Pagliai-Gassman staged many shows both in the dramatic and in the comic and brilliant genre. She had a long period dedicated to Luigi Pirandello. She also performed in Goldoni's The Liar, Georges Feydeau's The Cat in the Pocket, Svevo's Wedding Scenes, and Shakespeare's The Merchant of Venice and A Midsummer Night's Dream.

She acted with directors such as Squarzina, Bolognini, Sciaccaluga, and Ronconi. Her later shows included Miller's Down from Mount Morgan; Crouse's Life with Father; Mary Coyle Chase's Harvey; Iphigenia in Aulis and Helen (both by Euripides); and Viaggio a Venezia and La Bottega del Caffe (both by Goldoni).

In recent years with Ugo Pagliai, she dedicated herself to poetry and to all those pieces that are linked to memory and repertoire. In 2007, she published the autobiography A big family behind your back through Marsilio Editori.

== Personal life and death ==
Gassman was a companion of the actor Ugo Pagliai, whom she never married, and with whom she shared one son: Tommaso. She and her then-husband, actor Luciano Virgilio, had a daughter; Simona Virgilio known at the National Academy of Dramatic Art "Silvio D'Amico" (exactly as Paola's parents had done twenty years before). Her father Vittorio Gassman died of a heart attack on her 55th birthday.

After a prolonged illness, Paola Gassman died in Rome on 9 April 2024, at the age of 78.

== Filmography ==
=== Cinema ===
Year	Film	Role	Director	Notes	Ref
1970	Let's Have a Riot		Luigi Zampa		
1982	From Father to Son		Vittorio and Alessandro Gassman		
2001	Days		Laura Muscardin		
2010	Looking for Mary				
2017	Prayer		Davide Cavuti	Documentary	
2021	My Father		Antonio D'Ottavio	Documentary	
2021	A Martian Named Ennio		Davide Cavuti		

=== Television ===
Year	Show	Role	Episode	Notes	Ref
1972	The Famous Evasions		"L'évasion de Casanova"	directed by Jean-Pierre Decourt	
1973	Clash By Night			by Clifford Odets, directed by Maurizio Scaparro	
1975	Orlando furioso			directed by Luca Ronconi	
1976	Forget Lisa			directed by Salvatore Nocita	
1979	Fantastic Tales		"The Fall of House Usher"	directed by Daniele D'Anza	
1981	Portrait of the Unknown			by Diego Fabbri, directed by Mario Ferrero	
1983	The Cat in the Pocket			by Georges Feydeau, directed by Luigi Proietti	
1986	The Physicists			by Friedrich Dürrenmatt, directed by Vittorio Barino	
2013	All the Music of the Heart		"The Call"	directed by Ambrogio Lo Giudice	

=== Dubbing ===
- Margaret Tyzack in The Winter's Tale (1982), directed by Jane Howell.

== Radio ==
- "L'uomo alla moda", by George Etherege, directed by Carlo Di Stefano, 15 October 1969.
- "Under two flags", by Ouida, directed by Ernesto Cortese, 15 episodes, from 29 April to 17 May 1974.
- "The city and the years", by Konstantin Fedin, directed by Marcello Aste, 15 episodes, from 3 to 21 November 1975.
- "Uncle's Dream", by Fyodor Dostoevsky, directed by Romeo De Baggis, 6 episodes, from 23 to 29 June 1982.

== Theatre ==
Year	Show	Role	Director	Company	Notes	Ref
2010	Mia divina Eleonora		Milo Vallone			
	The Balcony of Golda					
2016	I hate Hamlet		Alessandro Benvenuti			

== Discography ==
- 2016 - Vitae, album by Davide Cavuti
