= Vecchio frac =

1955 song by Domenico Modugno

Single by Domenico Modugno
- A-side: "Vecchio frac"
- B-side: "E vene 'o sole"
- Released: September 1955
- Genre: Pop
- Length: 6 min: 11 sec
- Label: RCA Italiana
- Songwriter(s): Domenico Modugno

Domenico Modugno singles chronology
"Mese 'e settembre" (1955)	"Vecchio frac" (1955)	"Cantu d'Amuri" (1955)

"Vecchio frac" (literally "Old tailcoat") is a 1955 song written by Italian singer-songwriter Domenico Modugno.

The song is a dramatic ballad, with Modugno telling a story about an elegant man in tailcoat who is walking at midnight through the deserted streets and at dawn he commits suicide, and Modugno does not know who this man is and where he comes from. This song got its inspiration from the death of nobleman Raimondo Lanza di Trabia, the husband of actress Olga Villi, who committed suicide by jumping from a window of Hotel Eden in Rome, as well as from a short film by a close friend of Modugno, Riccardo Pazzaglia.

The song was initially ignored by audiences, eventually coming to success just after the Sanremo Festival triumphs of Modugno with "Nel blu, dipinto di blu" and "Piove (Ciao, ciao bambina)" and thanks to a RCA reissue, in a slightly modified version. Artists who covered the song include French singers Barbara and Colette Renard (with the title "L'homme en habit", with lyrics by Pierre Delanoë), Đorđe Marjanović (in a Slavic version titled "Stari Frack"), Claudio Villa (on his album Claudio Villa canta Modugno), Gabriella Ferri and Enrico Ruggeri.
