= Sante Notarnicola =

Italian poet and communist (1938–2021)

Sante Notarnicola (15 December 1938 – 22 March 2021) was an Italian communist militant, robber, murderer and poet.

He died due to complications from influenza, in Bologna, after recovering from COVID-19.

== In popular culture ==
Notarnicola was portrayed by Don Backy in the 1968 crime film Bandits in Milan, directed by Carlo Lizzani.

== Bibliography ==
- Alberto Asor Rosa (1991). "Notarnicola, Sante". Letteratura italiana. Gli autori. Dizionario bio-bibliografico e indici. Vol. 2: H-Z. Turin: Einaudi.
