= Luchino Visconti (disambiguation) =

Luchino Visconti (1906–1976) was an Italian filmmaker, theatre and opera director, and screenwriter.

Luchino Visconti may also refer to:

- Luchino Visconti (died 1349), a lord of Milan from 1339 to 1349
- Luchino Visconti (film), a film by Carlo Lizzani, about the Italian director Luchino Visconti
- David Luchino Visconti, an annual Italian cinematographic award given from 1976 to 1995
