= The Teacher from Vigevano =

1963 Italian film

- Directed by: Elio Petri
- Written by: Age & Scarpelli; Elio Petri
- Produced by: Dino De Laurentiis
- Cinematography: Otello Martelli
- Edited by: Ruggero Mastroianni
- Music by: Nino Rota
- Production company: Dino De Laurentiis Cinematografica
- Distributed by: Dino De Laurentiis Distribuzione
- Release date: 24 December 1963 (Italy)
- Running time: 106 minutes
- Country: Italy
- Language: Italian
- Budget: 431 million lire

Il maestro di Vigevano, English title The Teacher from Vigevano, is a 1963 Italian comedy drama film directed by Elio Petri. It is based on the novel of the same name by Lucio Mastronardi.

== Plot ==
Antonio Mombelli is a primary school teacher, married and father of a son. Although he is satisfied with his humble life and salary, his ambitious wife Ada pushes him to quit his job and open a small shoe factory with his severance pay. After his business' bankruptcy due to a tax investigation, Antonio takes a new exam to return to his teacher's job, but is devasteated to learn that Ada betrays him with local industrialist Bugatti.

== Cast ==
- Alberto Sordi as Antonio Mombelli
- Claire Bloom as Ada Mombelli
- Vito De Taranto as Pereghi, the director
- Piero Mazzarella as Bugatti
- Guido Spadea as Nanini
- Eva Magni as Nanini's widow
- Anna Carena as Drivaldi
- Gustavo D'Arpe as Amiconi
- Ya Doucheskaya as Eva
- Lilla Ferrante as the director's daughter
- Enzo Sancrotti as Carlo, Ada's brother
- Ignazio Gibilisco as Maraldi
- Bruno De Cerce as Cipollone
- Adriano Tocchio as Lawyer Racalmuto
- Tullio Scavazzi as Rino Mombelli
- Egidio Casolari as Filippi
- Aniello Coastabile as Zarzalli
- Lorenzo Logli as wholesaler
- Enzo Savone as Bugatti's son
- Olivo Mondin as janitor
- Gaetano Fusari as health insurance doctor
- Carlo Montini
- Nando Angelini
- Umberto Rocco
- Franco Moraldi
- Franco Tuminelli
- Joris Muzio

== Reception ==
The critical reception of The Teacher from Vigevano was mixed. Gianni Rondolino acknowledged Petri's portrayal of the locale, but criticised the film for repeatedly giving in to "the needs of mass entertainment" and "broad and simple tastes".
