= Letter at Dawn =

1948 film

- Directed by: Giorgio Bianch
- Written by: Aldo De Benedetti
- Produced by: Giuseppe Amato
- Cinematography: Václav Vích; Augusto Tiezzi
- Music by: Renzo Rossellini
- Release date: 1948
- Running time: 91 minutes
- Country: Italy
- Language: Italian

Letter at Dawn (Italian: Una lettera all'alba) is a 1948 Italian drama film directed by Giorgio Bianchi.

In 2008 it was restored and shown as part of a retrospective "Questi fantasmi: Cinema italiano ritrovato" at the 65th Venice International Film Festival.

== Cast ==
- Fosco Giachetti as Carlo Marini
- Jacques Sernas as Mario Maggi
- Lea Padovani as Anna Maggi
- Olga Villi as Renata
- Tatiana Pavlova as Countess Koloshky
- Vittorio Sanipoli as Enrico Verri
- Franca Marzi as Lilly
- Margherita Bagni as Sister Maria della Carità
- Nerio Bernardi as Augusto
- Paolo Ferrari as Augusto's son
- Salvo Randone as Donati
- Ernesto Calindri as the public prosecutor
