= Eva Magni =

Italian stage and film actress

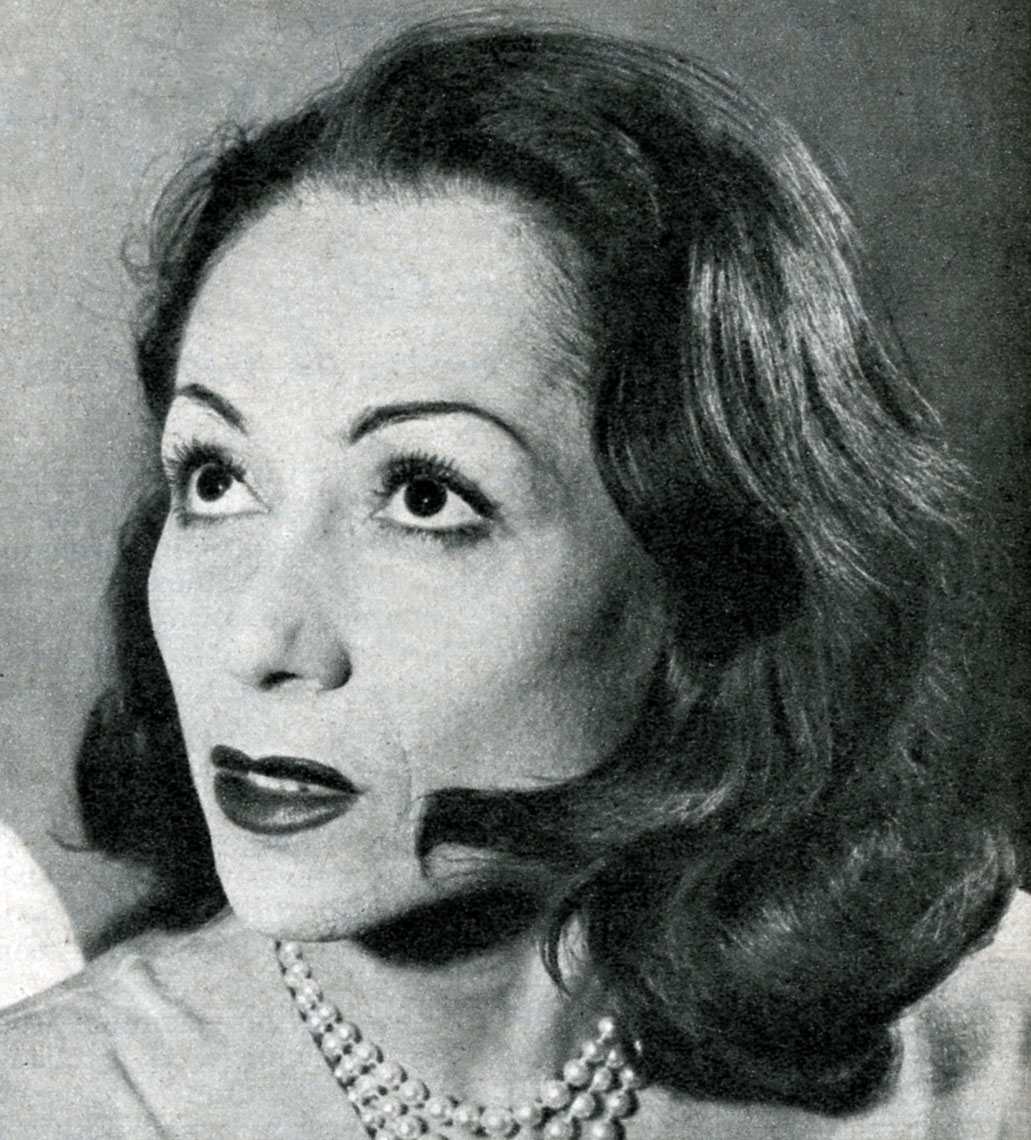
- Magni in 1954
- Born: 28 July 1909; Milan, Kingdom of Italy
- Died: 11 February 2005 (aged 95); Milan, Italy
- Occupation: Actress
- Spouse: Renzo Ricci (m. 1961; died 1978)

Eva Magni (July 28, 1909 – February 11, 2005) was an Italian stage and film actress. She was active between 1926 and the late 1970s.

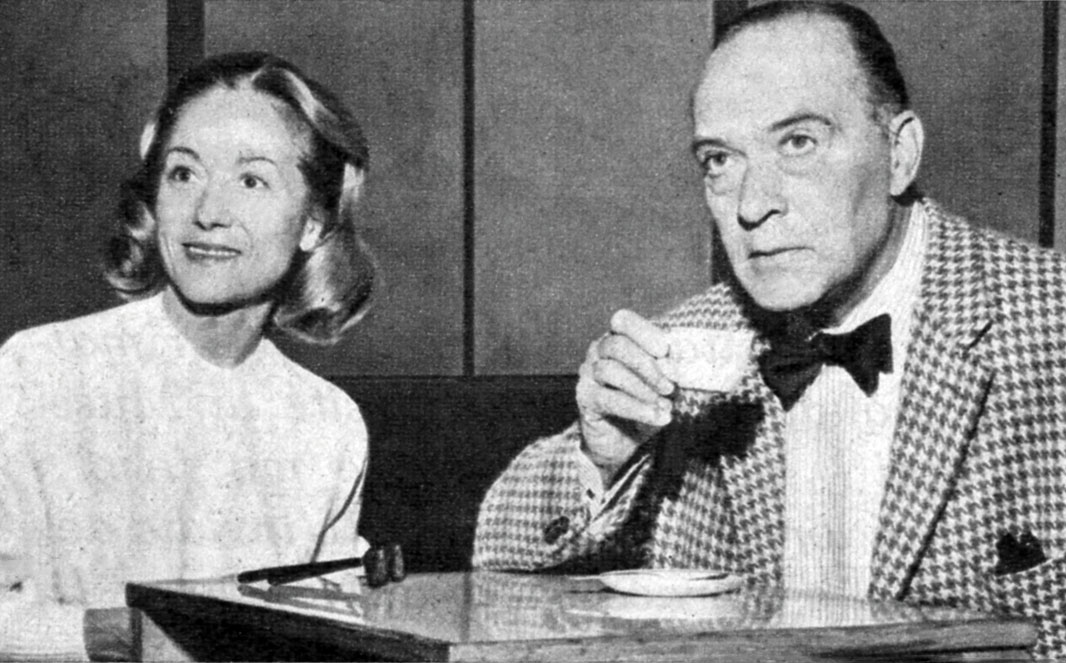
Eva Magni and Renzo Ricci, 1957

== Biography ==
Magni was born in Milan into a family of artists, and made her professional debut in 1926, in the stage company Teatro d'Arte di Roma directed by Luigi Pirandello. She debuted as lead actress two years later, in the company directed by Dario Niccodemi. After working in the stage companies led by Memo Benassi, Maria Melato and Laura Carli, in 1940 she was appointed first actress in the Renzo Ricci's company, with whom she eventually started a sentimental relationship. She married Ricci in December 1960 after the death of his first wife, Margherita Bagni.

Magni's first film appearance was as Lida Bonelli in Paprika (1933), directed by Carl Boese and starring Vittorio De Sica. She was in six more films during the 1930s. Her eighth and last film was in 1963 as the widow Nanni in Il maestro di Vigevano (The Teacher from Vigevano), directed by Elio Petri, and starring Alberto Sordi and Claire Bloom.

Magni was also active on radio.

Magni retired from acting after Ricci’s death in 1978. In the 1990s she was often a guest in the Canale 5 late night talk show Maurizio Costanzo Show. She died in her home in Milan in 2005.

== Filmography ==
- Paprika (1933) - Lida Bonelli
- The Girl with the Bruise (1933)
- Il presidente della Ba.Ce.Cre.Mi. (1933)
- La canzone del sole (The Song of the Sun, 1934) - Signora Bardelli
- Il serpente a sonagli (1935) – Diomira
- Golden Arrow (1935) - Maria
- The Amnesiac (1936) (uncredited)
- Il maestro di Vigevano (The Teacher from Vigevano, 1963) - Nanini’s widow

== Theatre (partial list) ==
- Long Day's Journey into Night
