= The Long Silence =

- Italian theatrical release poster
- Directed by: Margarethe von Trotta
- Written by: Felice Laudadio
- Starring: Carla Gravina; Jacques Perrin; Alida Valli; Ottavia Piccolo
- Cinematography: Marco Sperduti
- Edited by: Nino Baragli; Ugo De Rossi
- Music by: Ennio Morricone
- Production companies: Evento Spettacolo; Bioskop Film; KG Productions
- Distributed by: United International Pictures (Italy)
- Release date: 1993
- Countries: Italy; Germany; France
- Language: Italian

The Long Silence (Italian: Il lungo silenzio, German: Zeit des Zorns, French: Le long silence) is a 1993 Italian-German-French political thriller film directed by Margarethe von Trotta. For her performance in this film Carla Gravina was awarded Best Actress at the 1993 Montreal World Film Festival and won the Italian Golden Globe for Best Actress. The film also won the Italian Golden Globes for Best Original Score and for Best Screenplay.

== Cast ==
- Carla Gravina as Carla Aldrovandi
- Jacques Perrin as Marco Canova
- Paolo Graziosi as Francesco Mancini
- Agnese Nano as Maria Mancini
- Antonella Attili as Fantoni's Wife
- Alida Valli as Carla's Mother
- Ottavia Piccolo as Rosa
- Giuliano Montaldo as Prosecutor
- Ivano Marescotti as Fantoni

== See also ==
- List of Italian films of 1993
