= Carla Gravina =

Italian actress

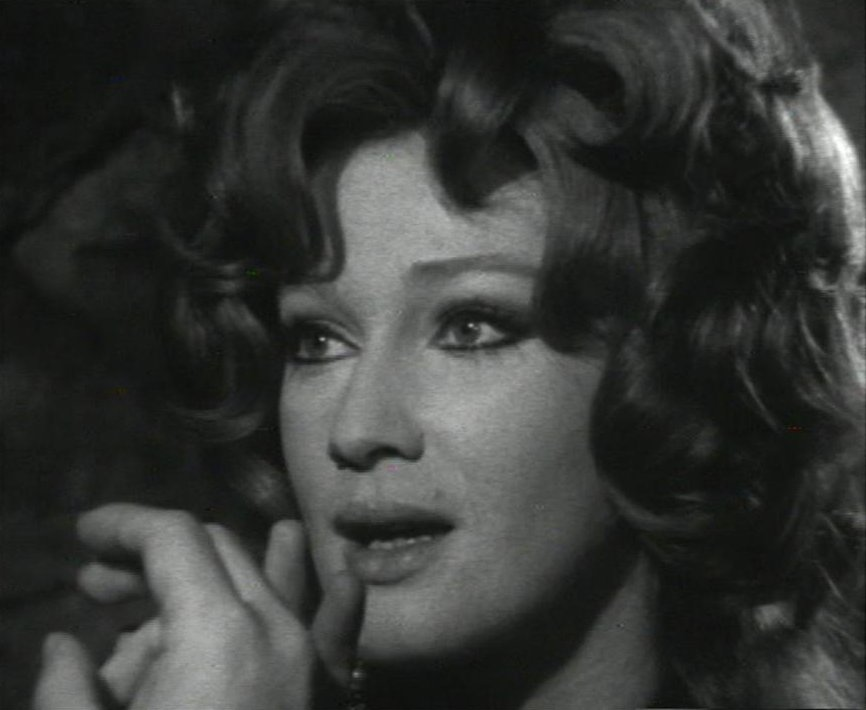
- Gravina in Il segno del comando (1971)
- Born: 5 August 1941 (age 85); Gemona del Friuli, Udine, Kingdom of Italy
- Occupations: Actress; politician
- Years active: 1957–1998
- Political party: Italian Communist Party
- Partner: Gian Maria Volonté (1960–1970)
- Children: 1

Member of the Chamber of Deputies
- In office 10 October 1980 – 10 July 1983

Carla Gravina (born 5 August 1941) is an Italian actress and politician. She received a Cannes Film Festival Award for Best Actress for her role in La Terrazza (1980). Her other notable roles were in Love and Chatter (1957), Esterina (1959), and The Long Silence (1993). Gravina was a member of the Chamber of Deputies for the Italian Communist Party in the 1980s.

== Life and career ==
Born in Gemona del Friuli, Gravina made her film debut at fifteen years old in Alberto Lattuada's Guendalina. Very active in films and television series, both in comedic and dramatic roles, from the late 1970s, she gradually focused her activities on stage and in political activism, being an Italian Communist Party (PCI) deputy between 1980 and 1983. Gravina was involved in a long-term relationship with fellow Italian actor Gian Maria Volonté, with whom she had a daughter.

== Awards ==
During her career, Gravina won a number of international awards, including the Best Actress Award for her performance in Alessandro Blasetti's Love and Chatter at the 1958 Locarno Film Festival, the award for Best Supporting Actress for her role in Ettore Scola's La Terrazza at the 1980 Cannes Film Festival, and the award for Best Actress for Margarethe von Trotta's The Long Silence at the 1993 Montreal World Film Festival.

== Selected filmography ==
- Love and Chatter (1957)
- Big Deal on Madonna Street (1958)
- First Love (1959)
- Policarpo (1959)
- Esterina (1959)
- Everybody Go Home (1960)
- Five Branded Women (1960)
- A Day for Lionhearts (1961)
- A Bullet for the General (1966)
- Bandits in Milan (1968)
- The Seven Cervi Brothers (1968)
- Cuore di mamma (1969)
- The Lady of Monza (1969)
- The Invisible Woman (1969)
- Sierra Maestra (1969)
- Il segno del comando (1971)
- Without Apparent Motive (1971)
- Il caso Pisciotta (1972)
- Alfredo, Alfredo (1972)
- Tony Arzenta (1973)
- The Inheritor (1973)
- The Antichrist (1974)
- And Now My Love (1974)
- Boomerang (1976)
- La terrazza (1980)
- Days of Inspector Ambrosio (1988)
- The Long Silence (1993)
