= Yvonne of the Night =

1949 film

- Directed by: Giuseppe Amato
- Written by: Fabrizio Sarazani; Oreste Biancoli; Giuseppe Amato
- Produced by: Giuseppe Amato; Angelo Rizzoli
- Starring: Totò; Olga Villi; Gino Cervi
- Cinematography: Mario Craveri
- Edited by: Maria Rosada
- Music by: Pasquale Frustaci
- Production companies: Amato Film; Rizzoli Film
- Distributed by: ENIC
- Release date: 24 November 1949
- Running time: 85 minutes
- Country: Italy
- Language: Italian

Yvonne of the Night (Italian: Yvonne la Nuit) is a 1949 Italian melodrama film directed by Giuseppe Amato and starring Totò, Olga Villi, and Frank Latimore. It was shot at the Cinecittà Studios in Rome. The film's sets were designed by the art director Gastone Medin.

== Synopsis ==
The son of a count engages in a romantic relationship with a popular entertainer much to the disgust of his father. While the son is apparently killed fighting for Italy during the First World War, his pregnant lover gives birth to a child.

== Cast ==
- Totò as Nino, il fantasista
- Olga Villi as Nerina Comi
- Frank Latimore as Lt. Carlo Rutelli
- Giulio Stival as Count Rutelli
- Eduardo De Filippo as Lawyer Rubini
- Gino Cervi as Colonel Baretti
- Arnoldo Foà as Senator
- John Strange as Major Tremiti
- Ave Ninchi as Sora Rudegarda
- Paola Veneroni as Rosetta
- Mario Riva as Ragazzo delle sigarette
- Arturo Dominici as Official
