= Mia moglie è una strega =

- Directed by: Castellano & Pipolo
- Screenplay by: Castellano & Pipolo; Laura Toscano; Franco Moratta
- Story by: Laura Toscano; Franco Moratta
- Produced by: Mario Cecchi Gori; Vittorio Cecchi Gori
- Starring: Renato Pozzetto; Eleonora Giorgi; Lia Tanzi; Helmut Berger
- Cinematography: Alfio Contini
- Edited by: Antonio Siciliano
- Music by: Detto Mariano
- Production company: Capital Films
- Distributed by: Cineriz
- Release date: 1 December 1980 (Italy)
- Running time: 88 minutes
- Country: Italy

Mia moglie è una strega (transl. My Wife is a Witch) is a 1980 Italian comedy film directed by Castellano & Pipolo.

== Plot ==
The spirit of Finnicella, a witch burned at the stake, is liberated. She immediately goes on the trail of a descendant of the cardinal who ordered her death, Emilio, a stock broker. Nevertheless, her plans for revenge will collide with love.

== Cast ==
- Renato Pozzetto as Emilio Altieri/Cardinal Altieri
- Eleonora Giorgi as Finnicella
- Lia Tanzi as Tania Grisanti
- Helmut Berger as Asmodeo

== Production ==
Mia moglie è una strega began shooting on May 19, 1980. Often described as a remake of I Married a Witch by René Clair, Castellano & Pipolo denied that the film was a remake, stating that the film was not a "remake, a retelling, or a rip-off" stating the film was more of an attempt at an American fantastique type film comparing it to Mary Poppins or The Love Bug. According to the directors, the film was made for about 800 million Italian lire.

== Release ==
Mia moglie è una strega was distributed theatrically in Italy by Cineriz on 1 December 1980. The film grossed a total 1,835,662,000 Italian lire domestically. It was among the highest-grossing films of the year in Italy, being the seventh highest-grossing film of the year.
