= Let's Have a Riot =

1970 film

- Film poster
- Directed by: Luigi Zampa
- Written by: Silvano Ambrogi; Leonardo Benvenuti; Piero De Bernardi
- Produced by: Mario Cecchi Gori
- Starring: Vittorio Gassman
- Cinematography: Sante Achilli; Giuseppe Ruzzolini
- Edited by: Sergio Montanari; Mario Morra
- Music by: Piero Piccioni
- Release date: 14 March 1970
- Running time: 125 minutes
- Country: Italy
- Language: Italian

Let's Have a Riot (Italian: Contestazione generale) is a 1970 Italian comedy film directed by Luigi Zampa and starring Vittorio Gassman.

== Cast ==
- Vittorio Gassman as Riccardo
- Nino Manfredi as Beretta
- Alberto Sordi as Don Giuseppe
- Enrico Maria Salerno as Don Roberto
- Michel Simon as Cavazza
- Marina Vlady as Imma
- Milly Vitale as Maria
- Sergio Tofano as Bishop of Orvieto
- Paola Gassman as TV Presentator
- Robert Mark as Piero
- Vittorio Duse as Brigadier Morelli
- Enzo Garinei as The Examiner
- Mariangela Melato
- Gastone Pescucci
