= Love and Chatter =

- Directed by: Alessandro Blasetti
- Written by: Cesare Zavattini
- Starring: Vittorio De Sica; Gino Cervi
- Cinematography: Gábor Pogány
- Edited by: Mario Serandrei
- Music by: Mario Nascimbene
- Release date: 1958
- Country: Italy
- Language: Italian

Amore e chiacchiere, internationally released as Love and Chatter, is a 1958 Italian comedy film directed by Alessandro Blasetti. It is based on a Cesare Zavattini's play with the same title.

For this film Carla Gravina was awarded best actress at the Locarno International Film Festival.

== Plot ==
A commendatore owns a splendid villa, which stands in a seaside resort facing a picturesque inlet. The view that can be enjoyed from the villa is however threatened by the presence of an asylum for old people, which the war has partly destroyed, and which is now being rebuilt. The commendatore has high-ranking acquaintances and could prevent the project, but the deputy mayor supports popular demands. A lawyer, who is also a municipal councilor acting as mayor, has the defect of considering himself a skilled speaker, and from this the commendatore tries to profit by offering him to give the inauguration speech of the villa in the presence of many authorities and television. However, he sets a condition: the lawyer will get the job, if he declares in public that he wants to prevent the disfigurement of the landscape. The deputy mayor is willing to accept, also because in the meantime his democratic ideas have suffered a severe blow with the escape from the house of his son, who got engaged to the daughter of the municipal sweeper. This engagement was initially forbidden by the girl's father himself, with rude ways that also included repeated slaps to his own daughter. When the same garbage man, through misunderstandings, comes to talk with the mayor about the engagement between the two young people, the mayor, Vittorio de Sica, indisputably prohibits this possibility, first making a picture of the time necessary for the boys to grow, arriving at the Landing on the Moon, which foresees for 1970, then with the threat of immediate dismissal of the garbage man himself. Meanwhile, the old people, tired of waiting, begin the construction of the kindergarten. At this point the lawyer makes a solemn promise in front of the cameras, and then gives the son permission to marry. The two young men, after a suicide attempt, are stopped by a policeman and taken home; the commendatore must thus accept the fait accompli.

== Cast ==
- Vittorio De Sica: Vittorio Bonelli
- Gino Cervi: Aristide Paseroni
- Carla Gravina: Maria Furlani
- Geronimo Meynier: Paolo Bonelli
- Elisa Cegani: Mrs. Bonelli
- Alessandra Panaro: Doddy Paseroni
- Isa Pola: Mrs. Paseroni
- Nicolas Perchicot: Ernesto Borghi
- Mario Meniconi: Furlani
- Félix Fernández: Salviati
- Renato Malavasi: Ripandelli
