= Vittorio Gassman =

Italian actor and director (1922–2000)

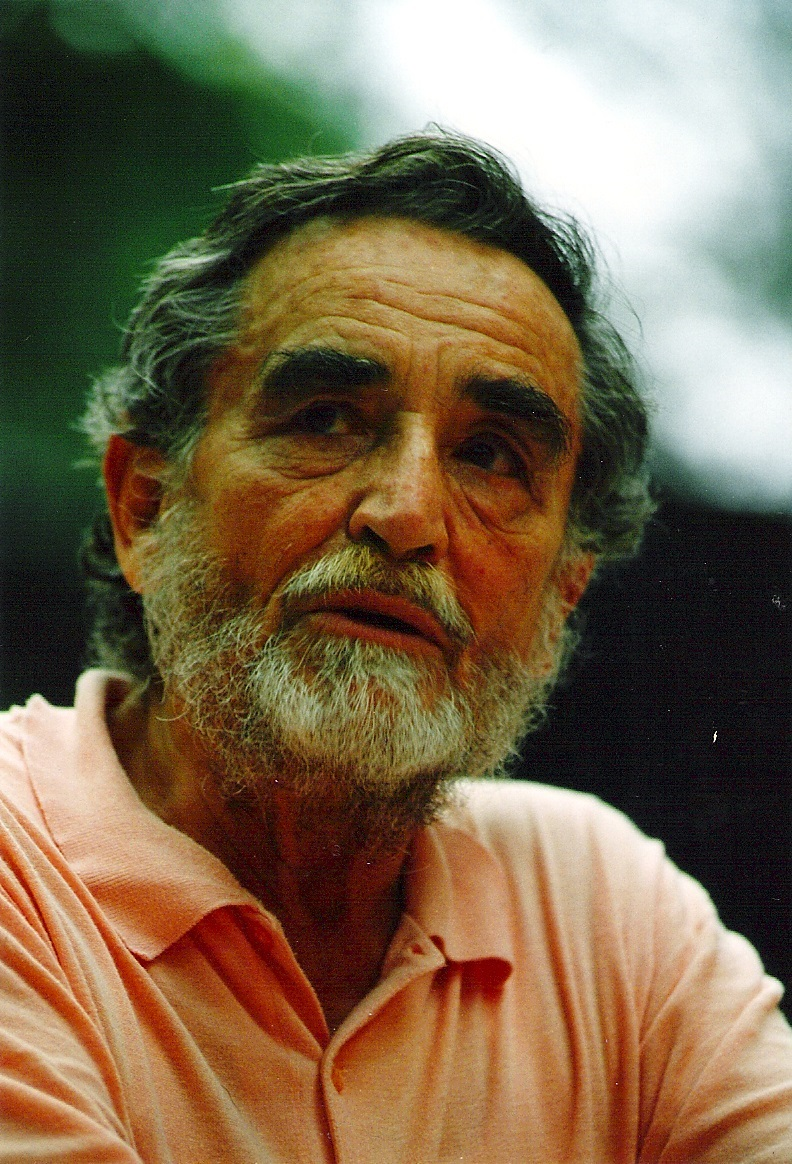
- Born: Vittorio Gassmann; 1 September 1922; Genoa, Italy
- Died: 29 June 2000 (aged 77); Rome, Italy
- Occupations: Actor; film director; writer; screenwriter
- Years active: 1942–1999
- Spouses: Nora Ricci (m. 1944; div. 1952) Shelley Winters (m. 1952; div. 1954) Diletta D'Andrea (m. 1972)
- Partner: Juliette Mayniel (1964–1968)
- Children: 4, including Paola and Alessandro
- Relatives: Leo Gassmann (grandson)
- Awards: Best Actor Award (Cannes Film Festival) (Scent of a Woman, 1975)

Vittorio Gassman (Italian pronunciation: [vitˈtɔːrjo ˈɡazman]; born Gassmann; 1 September 1922 – 29 June 2000), popularly known as Il Mattatore, was an Italian actor, director, and screenwriter.

He is considered one of the greatest Italian actors, whose career includes both important productions as well as dozens of divertissements.

== Early life ==
Gassman was born in Genoa to a German father, Heinrich Gassmann (an engineer from Karlsruhe), and an Italian Jewish mother, Luisa Ambron, born in Pisa. While still very young, he moved to Rome, where he studied at the Silvio D'Amico National Academy of Dramatic Arts.

== Career ==
Gassman's stage debut was in Milan, in 1942, with Alda Borelli in Niccodemi's La Nemica. He then moved to Rome and acted at the Teatro Eliseo joining Tino Carraro and Ernesto Calindri in a stage company that remained famous for some time; with them he acted in a range of plays from bourgeois comedy to sophisticated intellectual theatre. In 1946, he made his film debut in Preludio d'amore, while only one year later he appeared in five films. In 1948, he played in Bitter Rice.

It was with Luchino Visconti's company that Gassman achieved his mature successes, together with Paolo Stoppa, Rina Morelli and Paola Borboni. He played Stanley Kowalski in Tennessee Williams' Un tram che si chiama Desiderio (A Streetcar Named Desire), as well as in Come vi piace (As You Like It) by Shakespeare and Oreste (by Vittorio Alfieri). He joined the Teatro Nazionale with Tommaso Salvini, Massimo Girotti, Arnoldo Foà to create a successful Peer Gynt (by Henrik Ibsen). With Luigi Squarzina in 1952 he co-founded and co-directed the Teatro d'Arte Italiano, producing the first complete version of Hamlet in Italy, followed by rare works such as Seneca's Thyestes and Aeschylus's The Persians.

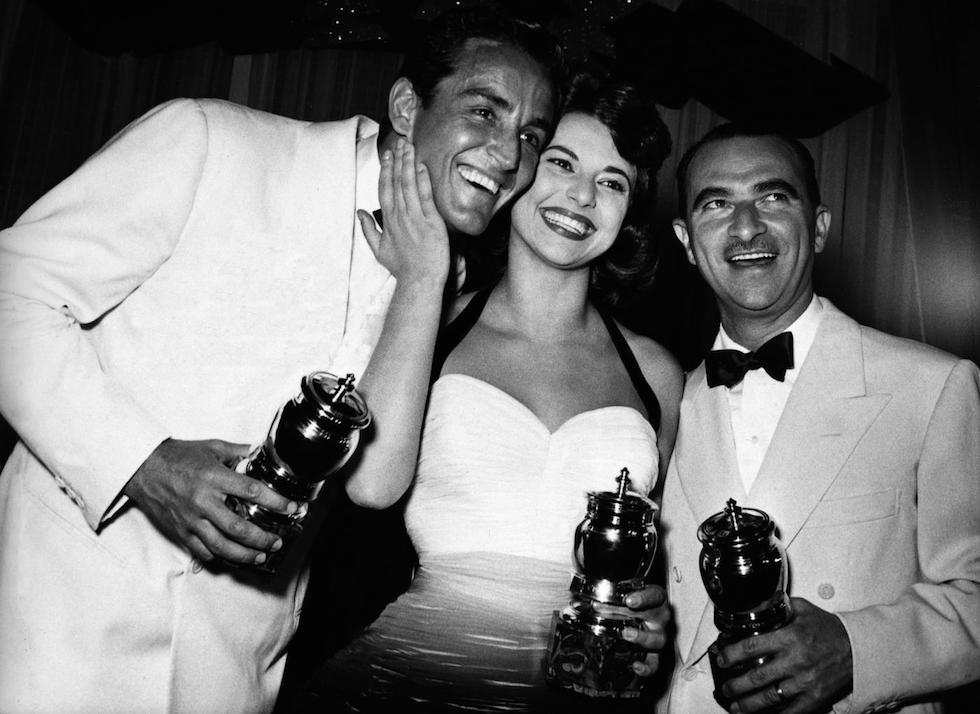
Gassman, Giovanna Ralli and Alberto Lattuada awarded at the 1957 Grolla d'oro

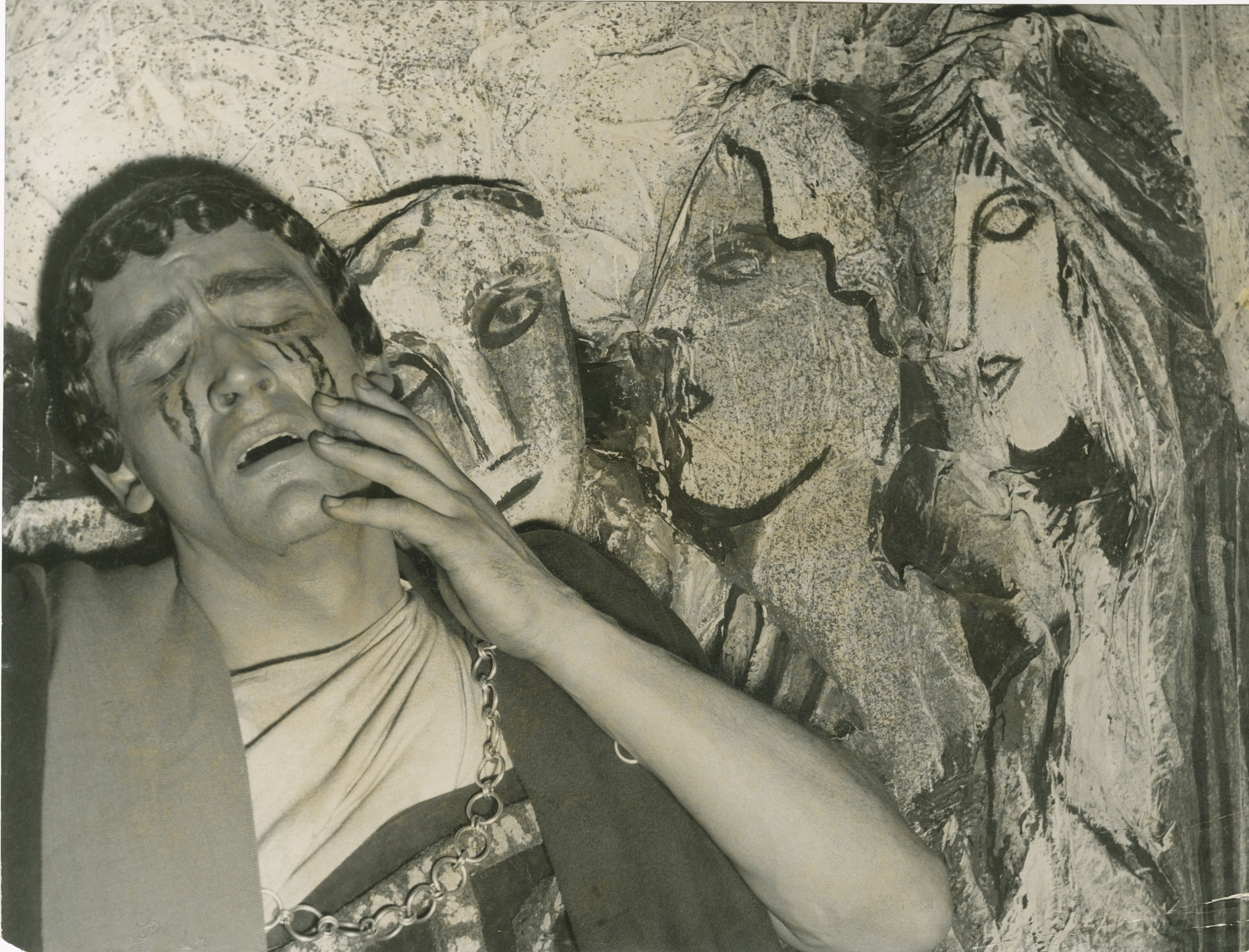
Vittorio Gassman during the performance of the tragedy Oedipus Rex in 1955

In 1956, Gassman played the title role in a production of Othello. He was so well received by his acting in the television series entitled Il Mattatore (Spotlight Chaser) that "Il Mattatore" became the nickname that accompanied him for the rest of his life. Gassman's debut in the commedia all'italiana genre was rather accidental, in Mario Monicelli's Big Deal on Madonna Street (1958). The Istituto Italiano di Cultura in London describes the film as "considered among the masterpieces of Italian cinema … The careers of both Gassman and Mastroianni were considerably helped by the success of the film, Gassman in particular, since before this point he was not deemed suitable for comedic roles."

Subsequent acclaimed films featuring Gassman include: The Easy Life (1962), The Great War (1962), I mostri (1963), For Love and Gold (1966), Scent of a Woman (1974) and We All Loved Each Other So Much (1974).

He directed Adelchi, a lesser-known work by Alessandro Manzoni. Gassman brought this production to half a million spectators, crossing Italy with his Teatro Popolare Itinerante (a newer edition of the famous Carro di Tespi). His productions have included many of the famous authors and playwrights of the 20th century, with repeated returns to the classics of Shakespeare, Dostoyevsky and the Greek tragicians. He also founded a theatre school in Florence (Bottega Teatrale di Firenze), which educated many of the more talented actors of the current generation of Italian thespians.

In cinema, he worked frequently both in Italy and abroad. He met and fell in love with American actress Shelley Winters while she was touring Europe with fiancé Farley Granger. When Winters was forced to return to Hollywood to fulfil contractual obligations, he followed her there and married her. With his natural charisma and his fluency in English, he scored a number of roles in Hollywood, including Rhapsody with Elizabeth Taylor and The Glass Wall before returning to Italy and the theatre.

In the 1990s he took part in the popular Italian Rai 3 TV show Tunnel in which he very formally and "seriously"' recited documents such as utility bills, yellow pages and similar trivial texts, such as washing instructions for a wool sweater or cookies ingredients. He rendered them with the same professional skill that made him famous while reciting Dante's Divine Comedy.

In 1994, Gassman voiced Mufasa in the Italian dubbed version of The Lion King. Gassman's voice was redubbed in several of his films by historical Italian actors and dubbers which include Emilio Cigoli, Sandro Ruffini, Gualtiero De Angelis, Stefano Sibaldi, Enrico Maria Salerno and Pino Locchi.

== Personal life ==
Gassman married three times, all to actresses: Nora Ricci (with whom he had Paola, an actress and wife of Ugo Pagliai); Shelley Winters (mother of his daughter Vittoria); and Diletta D'Andrea (mother of his son Jacopo).

While rehearsing Hamlet, he began an affair with Anna Maria Ferrero, his 16-year-old Ophelia, which ended his marriage to Winters. He and Winters were forced to work together on Mambo just as their marriage was unraveling, providing fodder for tabloids all over the world.

From 1964 to 1968 he was the partner of French actress Juliette Mayniel (mother of his son Alessandro, also an actor). Through Alessandro, he is the grandfather of singer-songwriter Leo Gassmann.

Gassman suffered from bipolar disorder.

== Death ==
On 29 June 2000, Gassman died of a heart attack in his sleep at his home in Rome at the age of 77. He was buried at Campo Verano.

== Filmography ==
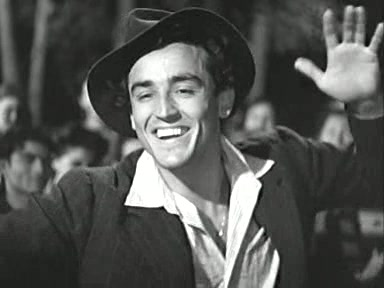
Vittorio Gassman in Bitter Rice (1948)

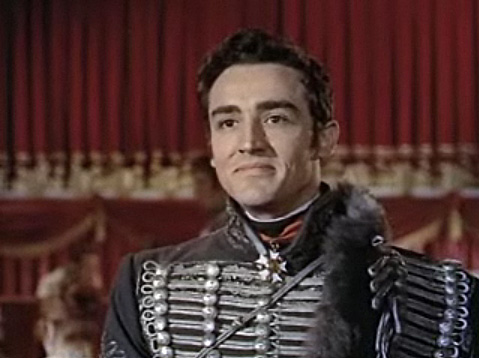
Gassman in War and Peace (1956)

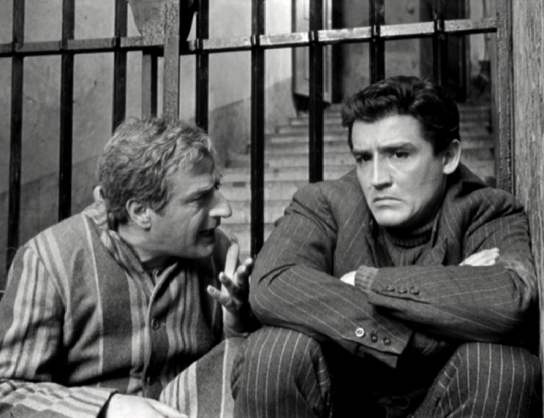
Memmo Carotenuto and Gassman in Big Deal on Madonna Street (1958)

Gassman, Silvana Mangano and Alberto Sordi in The Great War (1959)

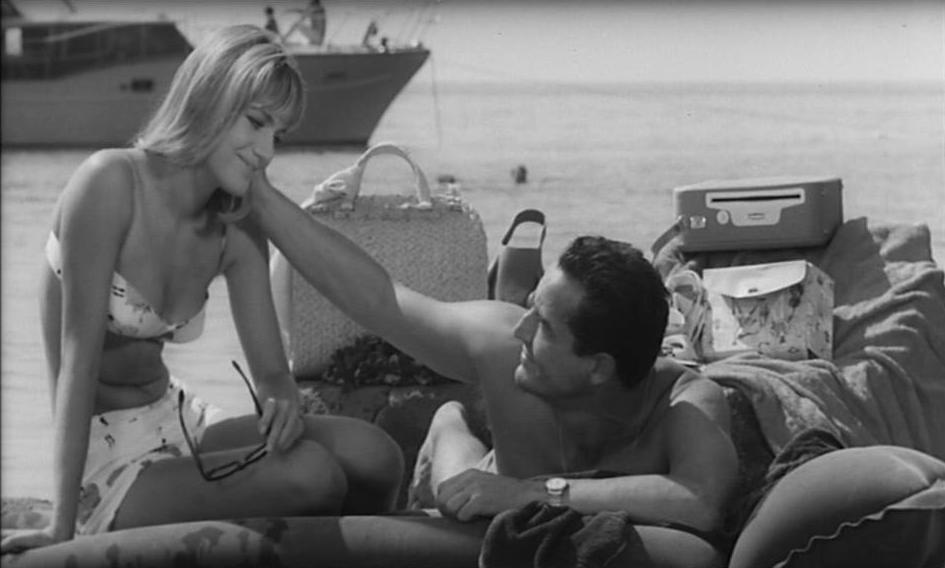
Catherine Spaak and Gassman in Il Sorpasso (1962)

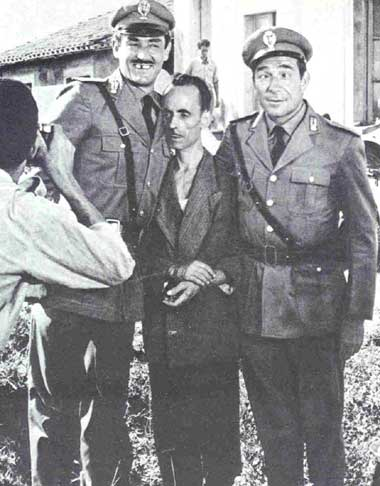
Gassman and Ugo Tognazzi in I Mostri (1963)

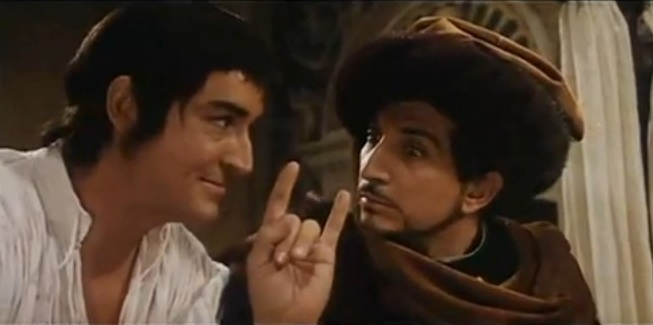
Gassman and Luigi Vannucchi in Pleasant Nights (1965)

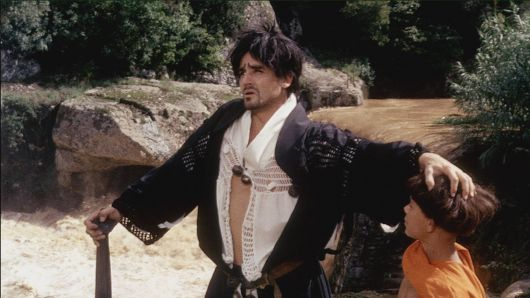
Gassman in L'armata Brancaleone (1965)

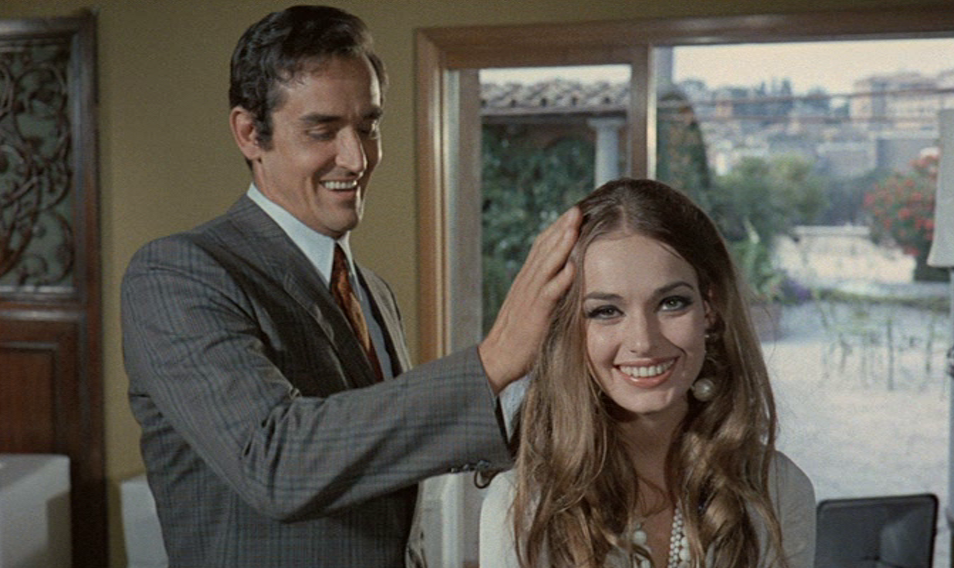
Gassman and Adrienne La Russa in The Black Sheep (1968)

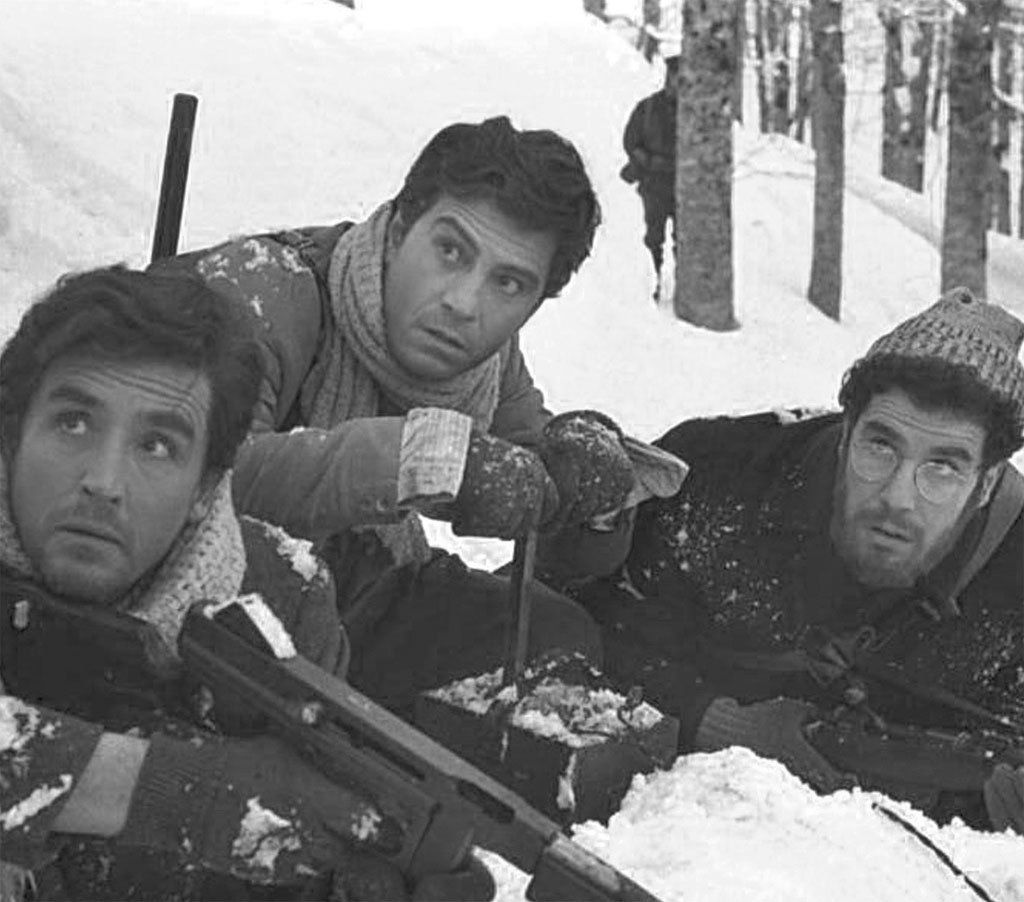
Gassman, Nino Manfredi and Stefano Satta Flores in We All Loved Each Other So Much (1974)

=== Actor ===
- Incontro con Laura (1945)
- The Captain's Daughter (1947) as Svabrin
- Love Prelude (Preludio d'amore, 1947) as Davide
- The Adventures of Pinocchio (Le avventure di Pinocchio, 1947) as The Green Fisherman
- Daniele Cortis (1947) as Daniele Cortis
- The Wandering Jew (L'ebreo errante, 1948) as Mathieu Nahum / Mathieu Blumenthal
- The Mysterious Rider (Il cavaliere misterioso, 1948) as Giacomo Casanova
- Bitter Rice (Riso amaro, 1949) as Walter
- Una voce nel tuo cuore (1949) as Paolo Baldini
- The Wolf of the Sila (Il lupo della Sila, 1949) as Pietro Campolo
- Streets of Sorrow (Ho sognato il paradiso, 1950) as Giorgio
- The Outlaws, (I fuorilegge, 1950) as Turi
- Hawk of the Nile (Lo sparviero del Nilo, 1950) as Yussuf
- The Lion of Amalfi (Il leone di Amalfi, 1950) as Mauro
- Double Cross (Il tradimento, 1951) as Renato Salvi
- The Black Crown (La corona negra, 1951) as Mauricio
- Anna (1951) as Vittorio
- The Dream of Zorro (Il sogno di Zorro, 1952) as Don Antonio / Juan
- Girls Marked Danger (La tratta delle bianche, 1952) as Michele
- The Glass Wall (1953) as Peter Kuban
- Sombrero (1953) as Alejandro Castillo
- Cry of the Hunted (1953) as Jory
- Rhapsody (1954) as Paul Bronte
- Mambo (1954) as Mario Rossi
- Beautiful but Dangerous (La donna più bella del mondo, 1955) as Prince Sergei
- The Violent Patriot (Giovanni dalle Bande Nere, 1956) as Giovanni delle Bande Nere
- War and Peace (1956) as Anatole Kuragin
- Difendo il mio amore (1956) as Giovanni Marchi
- Kean: Genius or Scoundrel (Kean - Genio e sregolatezza, 1957) as Edmund Kean
- Big Deal on Madonna Street (I soliti ignoti, 1958) as Peppe il pantera
- The Love Specialist (La ragazza del palio, 1958) as Piero di Montalcino
- Tempest (La tempesta, 1958) as Prosecutor
- The Great War (La grande guerra, 1959) as Giovanni Busacca
- The Miracle (1959) as Guido
- La cambiale (1959) as Michele
- Le sorprese dell'amore (1959) as The Schoolteacher (uncredited)
- Audace colpo dei soliti ignoti (aka Hold-up à la milanaise, 1959) as Peppe er pantera
- Love and Larceny (Il Mattatore, 1960) as Gerardo Latini
- Crimen (aka Killing in Monte Carlo, 1960) as Remo Capretti
- Ghosts of Rome (Fantasmi a Roma, 1961) as Giovanni Battista Villari, aka 'il Caparra'
- A Difficult Life (Una vita difficile, 1961) as himself (uncredited)
- The Last Judgment (Il giudizio universale, 1961) as Cimino
- The Italian Brigands (I briganti italiani, 1961) as O Caporale
- Barabbas (1961) as Sahak
- Anima nera (1962) as Adriano Zucchelli
- The Shortest Day (Il giorno più corto, 1962)
- The Easy Life (Il Sorpasso, 1962) as Bruno Cortona
- March on Rome (La Marcia su Roma, 1962) as Domenico Rocchetti
- Of Wayward Love (L'amore difficile, 1962) as L'avvocato (segment "L'avaro")
- The Eye of the Needle (La smania addosso, 1963) as Giorgio Mazzanò - lawyer
- Il Successo (1963) as Giulio Ceriani
- I Mostri (aka Opiate '67, 1963) as The Actor / Policeman / Production Assistant & Director / Nicola / Blonde Latin Lover / Lawyer D'Amore / Richetto / Roberto / Elisa / The Road Hog / The Friar / Artemio Altidori
- Shivers in Summer (Frenesia dell'estate, 1964) as Captain Mario Nardoni
- Let's Talk About Women (Se permettete parliamo di donne, 1964) as Stranger / Practical Joker / Client / Lover / Impatient Lover / Waiter / Timid Brother / Ragman / Prisoner
- Il Gaucho (1964) as Marco Ravicchio
- Hard Time for Princes (La Congiuntura, 1965) as Giuliano
- The Dirty Game (1965) as Perego / Ferrari (French)
- Slalom (1965) as Lucio Ridolfi
- A Maiden for a Prince (Una vergine per il principe, 1966) as Prince Don Vincenzo Gonzaga
- For Love and Gold (L'Armata Brancaleone, 1966) as Brancaleone da Norcia
- Pleasant Nights (Le piacevoli notti, 1966) as Bastiano da Sangallo
- The Devil in Love (L'arcidiavolo, 1966) as Belfagor
- The Tiger and the Pussycat (Il Tigre, 1967) as Francesco Vincenzini
- Woman Times Seven (Sette volte donna, 1967) as Cenci (segment "Two Against One")
- Ghosts – Italian Style (Questi fantasmi, 1968) as Pasquale Lojacono
- Catch as Catch Can (Lo scatenato, 1968) as Bob Chiaramonte
- Mr. Kinky (Il profeta, 1968) as Pietro Breccia
- The Black Sheep (La pecora nera, 1968) as Mario Agasti / Filippo Agasti
- Alibi (L'alibi, 1969) as Vittorio
- Where Are You Going All Naked? (Dove vai tutta nuda?, 1969) as Rufus Conforti
- The Thirteen Chairs (1969) as Mario Beretti
- The Archangel (L'arcangelo, 1969) as Furio Bertuccia
- Let's Have a Riot (Contestazione generale, 1970) as Riccardo
- The Divorce (Il divorzio, 1970) as Leonardo Nenci
- Brancaleone at the Crusades (Brancaleone alle Crociate, 1970) as Brancaleone da Norcia
- Scipio the African (Scipione detto anche l'africano, 1971) as Cato the Censor
- In the Name of the Italian People (In nome del popolo italiano, 1971) as Lorenzo Santenocito
- Without Family (Senza famiglia, nullatenenti cercano affetto, 1972) as Armando Zavanatti
- The Audience (L'udienza, 1972) as Prince Donati
- What Am I Doing in the Middle of a Revolution? (Che c'entriamo noi con la rivoluzione?, 1972) as Guido Guidi
- La Tosca (1973) as Scarpia
- Scent of a Woman (Profumo di donna, 1974) as Captain Fausto Consolo
- We All Loved Each Other So Much (C'eravamo tanto amati, 1974) as Gianni Perego
- The Immortal Bachelor (A mezzanotte va la ronda del piacere, 1975) as Andrea Sansoni
- The Career of a Chambermaid (Telefoni bianchi, 1976) as Franco Denza
- Pure as a Lily (Come una rosa al naso, 1976) as Anthony M. Wilson
- Goodnight, Ladies and Gentlemen (Signore e signori, buonanotte, 1976) as CIA Agent / Tuttumpezzo
- The Desert of the Tartars (Il deserto dei tartari, 1976) as Colonel Giovanbattista Filimore
- The Forbidden Room (Anima persa, 1977) as Fabio Stolz
- I nuovi mostri (aka Viva l'Italia!, 1977) as Cardinal / Waiter / Husband / Police Commissioner / Family Man
- A Wedding (1978) as Luigi Corelli
- Quintet (1979) as St. Christopher
- Dear Father (Caro papà, 1979) as Albino Millozza
- Happy Hobos (Due pezzi di pane, 1979) as Pippo Mifà
- I'm Photogenic (Sono fotogenico, 1980) as himself (uncredited)
- La terrazza (aka The Terrace, 1980) as Mario
- The Nude Bomb (1980) as Sauvage / Nino Salvatori Sebastiani
- Camera d'albergo (1981) as Achille Mengaroni
- Il turno (1981) as Ciro Coppa
- Sharky's Machine (1981) as Albert Scarelli / Victor D'Anton
- Di padre in figlio (1982) as himself
- Tempest (1982) as Alonzo
- Count Tacchia (Il Conte Tacchia, 1982) as Prince Torquato Terenzi
- Life Is a Bed of Roses (La Vie est un roman, 1983) as Walter Guarini
- Benvenuta (1983) as Livio Carpi
- Power of Evil (Paradigma, 1985) as Gottfried
- Big Deal After 20 Years (I Soliti ignoti vent'anni dopo, 1985) as Peppe il pantera
- The Family (La famiglia, 1987) as Carlo / Carlo's grandfather
- The Rogues (I Picari, 1987) as Marquis Felipe de Aragona
- Mortacci (1989) as Domenico
- The Sleazy Uncle (Lo zio indegno, 1989) as Uncle Luca
- The Palermo Connection (Dimenticare Palermo, 1990) as the Prince
- I'll Be Going Now (Tolgo il disturbo, 1990) as Augusto Scribani
- 1001 Nights (Les 1001 Nuits, 1990) as Sinbad
- The Amusements of Private Life (I divertimenti della vita privata, 1990) as Marquis
- Rossini! Rossini! (1991) as Ludwig van Beethoven (uncredited)
- The Long Winter (El Largo invierno, 1992) as Claudio
- When We Were Repressed (Quando eravamo repressi, 1992) as The Sexologist
- Abraham (1993, TV series) as Terah
- Once a Year, Every Year (Tutti gli anni una volta l'anno, 1994) as Giuseppe
- Sleepers (1996) as Benny 'King Benny'
- Desert of Fire (Deserto di fuoco, 1997, TV miniseries) as Tarek
- Un homme digne de confiance (1997) as Adriano Venturi
- The Dinner (La cena, 1998) as Maestro Pezzullo
- La bomba (1999) as Don Vito Bracalone
- Luchino Visconti (1999) as himself

=== Director ===
- Kean: Genius or Scoundrel (Kean - Genio e sregolatezza, 1957)
- Alibi (L'alibi, 1969)
- Without Family (Senza famiglia, nullatenenti cercano affetto, 1972)
- Di padre in figlio (1982)

== Dubbing roles ==
=== Animation ===
- Mufasa in The Lion King (1994), dubbing James Earl Jones

=== Live action ===
- Narrator in Romeo and Juliet (1968), dubbing Laurence Olivier

== Writer ==
- Luca de' Numeri. Novel, in 1947, won the Fogazzaro prize, published in 1965 (ed. Lerici).
- Un grande avvenire dietro le spalle. Milan (1981). Longanesi & C.
- Vocalizzi. Milan (1988). Longanesi & C.
- Memorie del sottoscala. Milan (1990). Longanesi & C.

== Audiobooks ==
- CL 0426 – Antologia moderna – Ungaretti, Cardarelli, Palazzeschi, Montale, Quasimodo.
- CL 0401 – Dante Alighieri – Inferno canto quinto.
- CL 0437 – Dante Alighieri – Inferno canto XXVI.
- CL 0402 – Dante Alighieri – Paradiso canto XXXIII.
- CL 0457 – Elogio Olimpico – Poesie sportive.
- CL 0459 – Eschilo – Coefore – with Valentina Fortunato and Maria Fabbri.
- CL 0438 – Foscolo – Sepolcri.
- CL 0439 – Leopardi – Poesie
- CL 0440 – Leopardi – Poesie.
- CL 0458 – Manzoni – Adelchi, with Carlo D'Angelo.
- CL 0414 – Manzoni – Promessi sposi.
- CL 0416 – Manzoni – Il cinque maggio.
- CL 0441 – Mistici del '200.
- CL 0470 – Pascarella – Sonetti.
- CL 0417 – Pascoli – Poesie.
- CL 0420 – Saba – Poesie.
- CL 0415 – Shakespeare – Amleto.
- CL 0427 – Sonetti attraverso i secoli.
- CL 0443 – Gassman nel Mattatore prose varie.
- CL 0444 – Gassman nel Mattatore prose varie.
- CLV 0604 – Shakespeare – Otello.
- CLV 0607 – Irma la dolce.
- CLV 0609 – Gassman – Il Mattatore prose varie.
