= Esterina =

- Directed by: Carlo Lizzani
- Written by: Ennio De Concini; Giorgio Arlorio
- Cinematography: Roberto Gerardi
- Edited by: Mario Serandrei
- Music by: Carlo Rustichelli
- Release date: 1959
- Running time: 95 minutes
- Country: Italy
- Language: Italian

Esterina is a 1959 Italian drama film directed by Carlo Lizzani. It was entered into the main competition at the 20th Venice International Film Festival, in which Carla Gravina received a special mention for her performance.

It was known as Head full of Cloth with filming starting May 1959.

It was one of several European films Horne starred in following his success in Bridge on the River Kwai.

== Cast ==
- Carla Gravina: Esterina
- Geoffrey Horne: Gino
- Domenico Modugno: Piero
- Anna Maria Aveta: Piero's Wife
- Silvana Jachino: Landlady
- Laura Nucci: Hooker
- Raimondo Van Riel: Old man
