= Appuntamento in riviera =

1962 film

- Directed by: Mario Mattoli
- Written by: Roberto Gianviti; Vittorio Metz
- Starring: Tony Renis; Mina; Graziella Granata
- Cinematography: Marco Scarpelli
- Edited by: Adriana Novelli
- Release date: 1962
- Running time: 93 minutes
- Country: Italy
- Language: Italian

Appuntamento in riviera is a 1962 Italian musical comedy film directed by Mario Mattoli and starring Tony Renis. It contains the original song "Quando, quando, quando", performed by one of its writers, Tony Renis.

== Cast ==
- Tony Renis as Tony
- Graziella Granata as Laura
- Francesco Mulé as Marengoni
- Piero Mazzarella as Cazzaniga
- Maria Letizia Gazzoni as Patrizia
- Annarosa Garatti
- Giulio Girola
- Santo Versace as Carlo
- Toni Ucci as Giacomo
- Lilli Lembo
- Mimmo Palmara as De Marchi
