= Modena, città dell'Emilia Rossa =

- Directed by: Carlo Lizzani
- Release date: 1950
- Country: Italy
- Language: Italian

Modena, città dell'Emilia Rossa is a 1950 Italian documentary film directed by Carlo Lizzani.
