= The Birds, the Bees and the Italians =

1966 film by Pietro Germi

- Italian theatrical release poster
- Italian: Signore & signori
- Literally: Ladies & Gentlemen
- Directed by: Pietro Germi
- Screenplay by: Age & Scarpelli; Luciano Vincenzoni; Pietro Germi
- Story by: Luciano Vincenzoni; Pietro Germi
- Produced by: Robert Haggiag; Pietro Germi
- Starring: Virna Lisi; Gastone Moschin; Nora Ricci; Alberto Lionello; Beba Lončar; Franco Fabrizi; Nora Ricci; Gigi Ballista
- Cinematography: Aiace Parolin
- Edited by: Sergio Montanari
- Music by: Carlo Rustichelli
- Production companies: Dear Film Produzione; R.P.A.; Les Films du Siècle
- Distributed by: Dear Film (Italy); 20th Century Fox (France)
- Release dates: 10 February 1966 (Italy); 24 June 1966 (France)
- Running time: 115 minutes
- Countries: Italy; France
- Language: Italian

The Birds, the Bees and the Italians (Italian: Signore & signori, lit. 'Ladies & Gentlemen') is a 1966 commedia all'italiana anthology film co-written and directed by Pietro Germi. It stars Virna Lisi, Gastone Moschin, Nora Ricci, Alberto Lionello, Beba Lončar, Franco Fabrizi, Nora Ricci and Gigi Ballista. The film consists of three segments set in a small town in Veneto: A married man pretends to be impotent to cover up an affair; a bank employee abandons his wife for his mistress; and a group of prominent local men discover that they all had sex with the same underage girl.

The film shared the Grand Prix with A Man and a Woman at the 1966 Cannes Film Festival. It was later selected for screening as part of the Cannes Classics section of the 2016 Cannes Film Festival.

In 2008, the film was included on the Italian Ministry of Cultural Heritage's 100 Italian films to be saved, a list of 100 films that "have changed the collective memory of the country between 1942 and 1978."

== Plot ==
In the fictional Venetian town of Rezega, a group of merchants and professionals from the upper-middle class conceal a complex web of underlying mutual betrayals.

Toni Gasparini, a charismatic playboy both admired and feared by friends, confides in Dr. Castellan, a friend and physician, admitting that he has been impotent for several months. This revelation is intended to make Castellan lower his guard regarding his young and lively wife, Noemi. Insensitively, the doctor spreads this confidential information among friends, purely for the pleasure of gossip, oblivious to the fact that he is inadvertently aiding Toni's scheme. Following a party, Castellan, along with others, continues the night of revelry at a nightclub, allowing Toni to accompany Noemi home. When a disbelieving friend, who had witnessed Toni's recent escapade approximately ten days prior, reveals this information, the doctor rushes home but arrives too late to prevent Noemi from being seduced. He is then compelled to conceal the incident to preserve his own honor. The historic phrase he utters while leaving the house is, "and let it stay between us", underscoring the importance of not being perceived as a "béco" or "cuckold" in Venetian dialect (and in the northeast in general).

Osvaldo Bisigato, an unassuming bank employee burdened by an oppressive and resentful wife, Gilda, who incessantly reproaches him for failures and a lack of ambition, believes he can embark on a new life by eloping with Milena Zulian, the young and beautiful cashier of the bar frequented by the group. However, while adultery is tacitly tolerated, separation is not socially acceptable in Italy, prompting the entire town to unite against him: Gilda's cousin (the influential Ippolita, Toni's wife), the so-called "friends", the employer, the parish priest, and even the Carabinieri commander. They all coerce him to reconsider and maintain the illusion of the sanctity of marital union. Don Schiavon convinces Milena to leave town, and Bisigato, after a suicide attempt and a stint in a clinic, returns submissive and resigned.

Alda Cristofoletto, a young and beautiful country girl (characterized as "white as milk" and "tough as marble" by shoe salesman Lino Benedetti), arrives in town for shopping and attracts the attention of a group of womanizers. However, the following day, farmer Bepi Cristofoletto, the father of the 16-year-old girl, reports them all for statutory rape. To prevent the community from being tarnished by the scandal of the trial, economic magnates and religious authorities silence the local press. Through a series of calls, they prompt reporter Tosato to erase names until no culprits remain in the article. The cold and calculating Ippolita, the wife of one of the accused, convinces the naive and honest farmer Cristofoletto to withdraw the complaint. She offers him a substantial sum of money in return, satisfying her own carnal desires and securing a considerable portion of the funds collected for "mediation", ostensibly intended for the poor.

== Cast ==
- Virna Lisi as Milena Zulian
- Gastone Moschin as Osvaldo Bisigato
- Alberto Lionello as Toni Gasparini
- Olga Villi as Ippolita Gasparini
- Beba Lončar as Noemi Castellan
- Franco Fabrizi as Lino Benedetti
- Nora Ricci as Gilda Bisigato
- Gigi Ballista as Giacinto Castellan
- Gia Sandri as Betty Soligo
- Quinto Parmeggiani as Giovanni Soligo
- Moira Orfei as Giorgia Casellato
- Aldo Puglisi as Carabiniere Mancuso
- Gustavo D'Arpe as Scarabello
- Alberto Rabagliati as Commander Galeazzo Casellato
- Patrizia Valturri as Alda Cristofoletto
- Carlo Bagno as Bepi Cristofoletto
- Giulio Questi as Franco Zaccaria
- Stefano Satta Flores as young carabiniere
- Virginio Gazzolo as Tosato
- Virgilio Scapin as Don Schiavon

== See also ==
- Divorce Italian Style
- Seduced and Abandoned (1964 film)
