= Corpse for the Lady =

1964 film

- Film poster
- Directed by: Mario Mattoli
- Written by: Franco Enna; Roberto Gianviti; Mario Mattoli
- Produced by: Isidoro Broggi; Dino De Laurentiis; Renato Libassi
- Starring: Franco Franchi; Ciccio Ingrassia; Sylva Koscina; Sandra Mondaini; Scilla Gabel
- Cinematography: Alessandro D'Eva
- Edited by: Roberto Cinquini
- Music by: Gianni Ferrio
- Release date: 1964
- Running time: 90 minutes
- Country: Italy
- Language: Italian

Corpse for the Lady (Italian: Cadavere per signora) is a 1964 Italian comedy film directed by Mario Mattoli and starring Sylva Koscina.

== Cast ==
- Sylva Koscina - Laura Guglielmetti
- Sergio Fantoni - Commisario
- Scilla Gabel - Renata
- Sandra Mondaini - Marina
- Lando Buzzanca - Enzo
- Franco Franchi - Gianni
- Ciccio Ingrassia - Luigi
- Rosalba Neri - Giovanna
- Elsa Vazzoler - Costanza
- Francesco Mulé - Augusto Ferrante (as Francesco Mulè)
- Toni Ucci - Michele
- Piero Mazzarella - Tommaso Borsotti
- Angelo Santi (as Angelo Santi Amantini)
- Paolo Bonacelli - Gedeon
