= Piero Chiara =

Italian writer

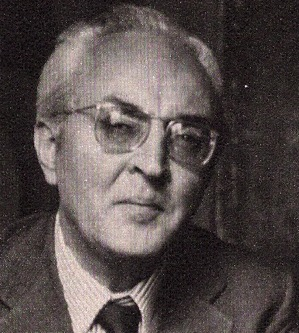
- Chiara in 1971
- Born: 23 March 1913; Luino, Varese, Kingdom of Italy
- Died: 31 December 1986 (aged 73); Varese, Italy
- Occupation: Writer
- Notable work: La stanza del vescovo
- Movement: Lombard line
- Spouse: Jula Sherb (m. 1936, divorced)
- Children: 1

Piero Chiara (23 March 1913 – 31 December 1986) was an Italian writer.

He was born in Luino, Italy. His father Eugenio was from Resuttano, Sicily, and his mother Virginia Maffei was from Comnago, a Piedmontese village in the municipality of Lesa. Sought by the Fascist militia during World War II, he fled to Switzerland in 1944. He returned to Italy two years later, starting his writing career. His most famous work is La stanza del vescovo of 1976, which was turned into a film by Dino Risi soon afterwards.

He was married to Jula Sherb of Swiss origin. They had one son Marco Chiara who was married and divorced from Judith Loeb Chiara of the Lehman family. He died in Varese in 1986.

The Disappearance of Signora Giulia was the first of his books to be translated into English.

== Biography ==
Piero Chiara was born in 1913 in Luino, a Lombard town on Lake Maggiore on the Switzerland. His father Eugenio was from Resuttano, Sicily, and had found work as a customs officer; his mother, Virginia Maffei, came from Comnago, a center on the Piedmont shore, and ran a basket and umbrella store with her brother. He spent a very restless youth, which resulted in his poor academic performance: his habit of playing hooky from school to loiter in the countryside or at the market earned him a failing grade in third grade.The following year he was promoted, but was precluded from attending public school and, as a result, went to the San Luigi boarding school in Verbania, but in fifth grade his parents transferred him to the De Filippi boarding school in Arona, Piedmont.

Flunking again in the second grade of gymnasium, he was sent to a photographer's shop to be a shop assistant. Having failed the latter, he enrolled at the Omar Institute in Novara where he earned a diploma as a mechanical engineer. He returned to Luino, however, and prepared there as a private student for the complementary license exams, finally passing them in June 1929. Meanwhile, he cultivated a passion for literature, alternating his free time between libraries and gyms where he practiced Boxing and Wrestling to fortify his slender build.

After a period in Rome and Naples, he emigrated to France, to Nice and then to Paris, where he worked in various trades. Returning to his homeland in 1931, at the medical examination for Military service conscription he was reformed due to severe Myopia. He led the next period substantially in idleness, among cafes and gambling halls, often staying in Milan, where he frequented the reading rooms of the Ambrosiana and the Biblioteca di Brera library.

In October 1932 he won a competition as a chancellor's aide and was sent to the Pontebba Magistrate's Court in Val Canale. He was then transferred to Aidussina, near the border with the Kingdom of Yugoslavia, but the following spring he moved to Cividale del Friuli. In the small town he encountered a more stimulating environment that led him to develop a critical view of Fascism.

After being caught with a mistress at his workplace, he spent a leave of absence until the spring of 1934, when he was sent to the Varese Magistrate's Court. Here, too, he pursued his literary interests, fortifying his cultural background: he read Baudelaire, Verlaine, Rimbaud, the 19th-century French and Russian novelists, as well as Giovanni Boccaccio and the Lazarillo de Tormes. He also collaborated with some local periodicals, publishing some art articles.

Meanwhile, after a series of romances, he fell in love with Jula Scherb, daughter of a prominent Zurich doctor.The couple married on October 20, 1936, in the Basilica of Sant'Ambrogio, thus settling in Varese. However, the marriage soon went into crisis, and the misunderstandings were not smoothed out even by the birth of their son Marco in 1937, who spent the first ten years of his life in a Swiss boarding school, seeing his father only sporadically; the relationship between the two would always remain seesaw.

Aspiring for a radical change in his existence, Chiara applied for and received a visa to settle in Bolivia, but the outbreak of World War II forced him to remain in Italy.

After his brief call to arms, despite his lack of interest in politics, he was forced to flee to Switzerland (1944) following an arrest order issued by the Tribunale speciale per la difesa dello Stato (1926–1943) for placing, on July 25, 1943, at the fall of Fascism, the bust of Mussolini in the defendants' cage of the court where he worked. In Switzerland he lived in some camps where Italian refugees were interned. When the war ended, he taught literature at the Italian high school in Zugerberg and returned to Italy the following year. Thus began a period of fervid inventiveness and continuous creativity.In 1955 he met Mimma Buzzetti, whose partner he became first and then husband in 1974.

In 1962 with the novel Il piatto piange he inaugurated at Mondadori publishing house the series “Il Tornasole,” directed by Niccolò Gallo and Vittorio Sereni. The novel was quite successful to the point that an expanded edition was published in 1964.

In 1970 Piero Chiara has an acting role in Venga a prendere il caffè... da noi, a film directed by Alberto Lattuada and starring Ugo Tognazzi, based on his 1964 novel La spartizione, for which he also collaborated on the screenplay. In the same year he also took part as an actor in the Rai screenplay I giovedì della signora Giulia, also based on his novel of the same name (partially modified in the ending), playing the part of the praetor.

His writing career culminated in 1976 with the masterpiece The Bishop's Room, a sales champion and immediately transposed into a highly successful film directed by Dino Risi and also starring Ugo Tognazzi, along with Ornella Muti and Patrick Dewaere. Clare himself, though always highly skeptical of film versions of his works, appears in them as an extra or acting in small parts, for example as a court judge in Homo Eroticus and Sono stato io!

Chiara was also a militant in the Italian Liberal Party, going as far as the national deputy secretary, and was affiliated with Freemasonry in Italy in the lodges of Varese, Milan, Como and Laveno-Mombello.

Stricken by a form of cancer, he died Dec. 31, 1986, in his apartment in Varese; on Jan. 2, 1987, after an initial blessing in the church of Sant'Antonio alla Motta, the body was moved to the church of San Pietro in Campagna in Luino, where the funeral was celebrated. Curiously, the secular funeral of Felice Fo, father of actor and playwright Dario Fo, was held on the same day, so that several bystanders who had come to pay their last respects to the writer were misled and followed the said funeral procession, realizing their mistake only after several minutes. At the end of the rite, Piero Chiara was buried in the graveyard adjoining the church.

In her will, Chiara named as her editorial heir the historical collaborator Federico Roncoroni (1944–2021), entrusting him with the administration of the rights to her works and the curatorship of her own private archive, partly kept by Roncoroni himself; most of the fund is instead divided between the municipalities of Varese (at Villa Mirabello and the Biblioteca Civica) and Luino (at Palazzo Verbania). Part of the inheritance also passed to his son Marco, who later died in 2011.

Three years after his death, the City of Varese, with the approval of his heirs, will honor his memory by establishing the Chiara Prize, an annual literary competition aimed at short story collections published in Italy and Languages of Switzerland.
