= Bandits in Milan =

1968 film by Carlo Lizzani

- Film poster under alternative English title
- Italian: Banditi a Milano
- Directed by: Carlo Lizzani
- Screenplay by: Massimo De Rita; Dino Maiuri; Carlo Lizzanii
- Story by: Carlo Lizzani
- Produced by: Dino De Laurentiis
- Starring: Gian Maria Volonté; Don Backy; Ray Lovelock; Margaret Lee; Tomas Milian
- Cinematography: Giuseppe Ruzzolini
- Edited by: Franco Fraticelli
- Music by: Riz Ortolani
- Production company: Dino de Laurentiis Cinematografica
- Distributed by: Paramount Pictures
- Release date: 30 March 1968
- Running time: 98 minutes
- Country: Italy
- Language: Italian
- Box office: ₤1.768 billion

Bandits in Milan (Italian: Banditi a Milano; also known as The Violent Four) is a 1968 Italian crime film directed and co-written by Carlo Lizzani, and starring Gian Maria Volonté, Tomas Milian, Don Backy, and Ray Lovelock. It also features Agostina Belli in her film debut. The docudrama-style film is based on a real September 1967 bank robbery in Milan by the Banda Cavallero, a far-left militant cell.

The film was a critical and commercial success, with Lizzani winning the David di Donatello for Best Director. The success of the film helped spawn the poliziottesco sub-genre in the following decade.

In 2008, the film was included on the Italian Ministry of Cultural Heritage’s 100 Italian films to be saved, a list of 100 films that "have changed the collective memory of the country between 1942 and 1978."

== Cast ==
- Gian Maria Volonté as Piero Canestraro (based on Pietro Cavallero)
- Don Backy as Sandro Giannantonio (Sante Notarnicola)
- Ray Lovelock as Tuccio (Donato Lopez)
- Tomas Milian as Commissario Basevi
- Ezio Sancrotti as Bartolini (Adriano Rovoletto)
- Piero Mazzarella as Piva
- Laura Solari as Tuccio's Mother
- Margaret Lee as the Prostitute
- Carla Gravina as Anna
- Agostina Belli as Female Hostage
- María Rosa Sclauzero as Piero's Secretary

== Production ==
Like director Carlo Lizzani's previous film Wake Up and Die is based on a real life event, specifically a bank robbery that went wrong in Milan on 25 September 1967. The film was made during the seven months following the arrest of the gang, but before their trial, which lead to a legal challenge in an attempt to block its release in theaters. As such, the members of the gang had their names changed for the film.

It was one of two high-profile crime films produced by Dino De Laurentiis in 1968, the other was Bandits in Rome, which shared two of the same screenwriters.

== Release ==
Bandits in Milan was listed to compete at the 1968 Cannes Film Festival, but the festival was cancelled due to the events of May 1968 in France. It had its world premiere at the Teatro Carignano in Turin on 30 March 1968.

Due to lingering rights issues, the film has long been unavailable on home video.

== Reception ==
The film grossed just over ₤1.768 million in Italy.

=== Awards and nominations ===
| Institution | Year | Category | Nominee | Result |
|---|---|---|---|---|
| Berlin International Film Festival | 1968 | Golden Bear | Carlo Lizzani | Nominated |
| Cannes Film Festival | 1968 | Palme d'Or | Carlo Lizzani | Nominated (Note: Event cancelled before outcome decided.) |
| David di Donatello | 1968 | Best Director | Carlo Lizzani | Won |
| David di Donatello | 1968 | Best Production | Dino De Laurentiis | Won (Note: Tied with Ermanno Donati and Luigi Carpentieri The Day of the Owl) |
| Nastro d'Argento | 1969 | Best Director | Carlo Lizzani | Nominated |
| Nastro d'Argento | 1969 | Best Screenplay | Dino Maiuri, Massimo De Rita, Carlo Lizzani | Won |
| Nastro d'Argento | 1969 | Best Actor | Gian Maria Volonté | Nominated |

== Notes ==
=== References ===
- Curti, Roberto (2013). Italian Crime Filmography, 1968-1980. McFarland. ISBN 978-0786469765.
