= Raimondo Lanza di Trabia =

Italian nobleman, soldier, diplomat and sportsman

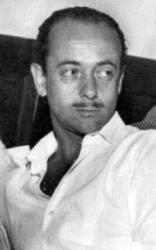
- Born: 11 September 1915; Arcellasco, Italy
- Died: 30 November 1954 (aged 39); Rome, Italy
- Occupations: Soldier, sportsman
- Known for: Former Chairman of Palermo Football Club
- Spouse: Olga Villi
- Children: Venturella (1953), Raimonda (1955)

Raimondo Lanza di Trabia (Arcellasco, 11 September 1915 – Rome, 30 November 1954) was an Italian nobleman, soldier and sportsman. Member of an important Sicilian noble family, he was chairman of the football team Palermo Football Club from 1951 to 1952.

== Biography ==
Raimondo Lanza di Trabia was born in a little town of Lombardy, from an underground relation between the Sicilian prince Giuseppe Lanza Branciforte, belonging to the ancient Lanza family, and a Venetian noblewoman, Maddalena Papadopoli Aldobrandini. Thanks to his paternal grandmother, Giulia Florio it, he was legitimised and raised by his grandparents in Palermo, in the family residence of Palazzo Butera.

In 1936 he served as volunteer in the Italian Army during the Spanish Civil War and took part in the Battle of Guadalajara. During the first years of the World War II he served as an Army officer and secret agent. He opened a secret communication channel with the Allies. After the Armistice of Cassibile Lanza di Trabia served as sidekick of the General Giacomo Carboni and liaison officer. He enrolled with Office of Strategic Services and collaborated with British and American Intelligence.

Jet setter and bon vivant, he was friend with Galeazzo Ciano, Gianni Agnelli and his sister Susanna and, after the war, Giuseppe Tomasi di Lampedusa, Luchino Visconti, Aristotle Onassis and the Persian Shah Mohammad Reza Pahlavi. According to his biographers, Lanza di Trabia had relations with Rita Hayworth and Carroll Baker.

After the war he studied in England and then moved to Paris in order to undertake the diplomatic career. He became chairman of U.S. Palermo on 26 January 1951. He brought to Palermo some talented players, like Helge Bronée, but terminated his presidency on 30 June 1952, just one year after assuming the office. He also took part in the Targa Florio race.

In 1953 Lanza di Trabia married the actress Olga Villi and had two daughters, Venturella (1953) and Raimonda (1955). Lanza di Trabia died under suspicious circumstances on 30 November 1954, falling from the window of a hotel in Rome. The singer Domenico Modugno dedicated the song "Vecchio frac" to him.

== Bibliography ==
- Vincenzo Prestigiacomo, Il principe irrequieto, Nuova Ipsa 2006
- Marcello Sorgi, Il grande dandy. Vita spericolata di Raimondo Lanza di Trabia, ultimo principe siciliano, Rizzoli, 2011
- Giuseppe Bagnati; Vito Maggio; Vincenzo Prestigiacomo (2004). Il Palermo racconta: storie, confessioni e leggende rosanero. Palermo: Grafill. p. 10. ISBN 88-8207-144-8.
- Raimonda Lanza di Trabia; Ottavia Casagrande (2014). Mi toccherà ballare. Milano: Feltrinelli. ISBN 978-88-07-49168-9.
- Ottavia Casagrande (2018). Quando si spense la notte. Feltrinelli. ISBN 9788807492358.

== See also ==
- Lanza (family)
- List of unsolved deaths
- Olga Villi
- U.S. Città di Palermo
