= Four Red Roses =

1952 film directed by Nunzio Malasomma

- Film poster
- Directed by: Nunzio Malasomma
- Written by: Franco Bondioli; Gaspare Cataldo; Nunzio Malasomma
- Produced by: Nino Angioletti
- Starring: Olga Villi; Jean-Claude Pascal; Fosco Giachetti
- Cinematography: Mario Craveri
- Edited by: Gabriele Varriale
- Music by: Ezio Carabella
- Production company: Cinematografica Distributori Indipendenti
- Distributed by: Cinematografica Distributori Indipendenti
- Release date: February 1952
- Running time: 99 minutes
- Country: Italy
- Language: Italian

Four Red Roses (Italian: Quattro rose rosse) is a 1952 Italian historical melodrama film directed by Nunzio Malasomma and starring Olga Villi, Jean-Claude Pascal and Fosco Giachetti. A melodrama, it is set during the early years of the twentieth century.

The film's sets were designed by the art directors Piero Filippone and Mario Rappini. It earned around 136 million lira at the box office.

== Plot ==
In the early years of the twentieth century, during horse racing, a banker fails to conquer a model spotted by an already engaged boy and, in revenge, he makes the latter believe that he has conquered her and warns his girlfriend of her betrayal. The young man is challenged to a duel by her brother, but before the fight he manages to obtain evidence (which will later prove to be bogus) of the woman's betrayal. Several years later, the protagonists will meet again; when all things seem to be smoothed out, the banker's sudden jealousy sets off tragedy.

== Main cast ==
- Olga Villi as Luisa
- Jean-Claude Pascal as Pietro Leandri
- Fosco Giachetti as Antonio Berti
- Valerie Darc as Colette
- Aldo Nicodemi as Massimo, fratello di Luisa
- Bianca Maria Fusari as Carla
- Carlo Ninchi as Gustavo Leandri
- Margherita Bagni as Signora Tonelli

== Bibliography ==
- Chiti, Roberto; Poppi, Roberto (1991). Dizionario del cinema italiano: Dal 1945 al 1959. Gremese Editore.
