= The Bishop's Bedroom =

- Directed by: Dino Risi
- Written by: Leo Benvenuti
- Story by: Piero Chiara
- Starring: Ugo Tognazzi; Ornella Muti; Patrick Dewaere
- Cinematography: Franco Di Giacomo
- Edited by: Alberto Gallitti
- Music by: Glenn Miller; Parish; Armando Trovajoli
- Distributed by: Titanus Produzione
- Release dates: 18 March 1977 (Italy); 14 September 1977 (France)
- Running time: c. 110 minutes
- Countries: Italy; France
- Language: Italian

The Bishop's Bedroom (Italian: La stanza del vescovo) is an Italian thriller-drama film directed by Dino Risi adapted from the novel of the same name by Piero Chiara. It stars Ugo Tognazzi, Ornella Muti and Patrick Dewaere. Supporting actors include Lia Tanzi and Piero Mazzarella. The film was presented out of competition at the 1977 Cannes Film Festival.

Lake Maggiore provides a beautiful and evocative backdrop to the action: the central events of the film take place around Baveno as opposed to Oggebbio in the novel.

== Plot ==
After spending World War II in neutral Switzerland to avoid military service, an unsure young man named Marco arrives in his boat on Lake Maggiore. He is befriended by a quirky man named Mario, a womanizing liar who, after a colorful life as an army officer in Africa, has married Cleofe Berlusconi, a rich older woman who resents his laziness and his weakness of character. Invited to dinner in the crumbling Berlusconi mansion, Marco meets the sour wife and a glamorous young widow. This is Matilde, hastily married to Cleofe's brother before he went off to the war in Africa, from which he did not return.

Mario cultivates Marco as an escape from his stifling home life and joins him on his boat for a cruise with two uninhibited Swiss girls. Later, Mario confesses to Marco that he has reached an understanding with Matilde, his sister-in-law, but lacks the means to run away with her. Marco is hurt, because he too is smitten with the young woman, but is talked into taking Mario and Matilde for another cruise on the boat, during which the two consummate their relationship. When a fierce storm hits the lake, they all take refuge in a hotel and, stepping out for some fresh air after dark, Marco sees a man on a bicycle who looks just like Mario. In the morning, the police bring the news that Cleofe has been found dead. For lack of any other explanation, the verdict is suicide.

The newly-widowed Mario now marries the widow Matilde, who proves to be no sweeter a spouse than her predecessor. Their deteriorating relationship is shattered when Angelo Berlusconi, the husband she thought dead, reappears and says that he had been exchanging letters with Cleofe all along. Her last letter to him, just before her death, ruled out any suspicion of suicide.

At Matilde's suggestion, Marco then shares with the police his suspicion that the man on the bicycle was Mario, who was not in bed with Matilde but on his way to murder Cleofe. A fresh inquiry is launched, in which Matilde says Mario did leave the room but she had no idea of his intention. On being confronted, Mario admits his guilt and is given ten minutes to collect his things from his room, where he hangs himself.

Angelo Berlusconi then renounces his share in the inheritance, leaving all the family wealth to the again-widowed Matilde. She invites Marco into her bed but, after one wild night together, he knows that she will betray him as well and in the morning disappears on his boat.

== Cast ==
- Ugo Tognazzi: Temistocle Mario Orimbelli
- Ornella Muti: Matilde Scrosati in Berlusconi
- Patrick Dewaere: Marco Maffei
- Lia Tanzi: Landina
- Gabriella Giacobbe: Cleofe Berlusconi In Orimbelli
- Max Turilli: Angelo Berlusconi
- Piero Mazzarella: Brighenti
- Renzo Ozzano: Brigadiere
- Katia Tchenko: Charlotte

== See also ==
- List of Italian films of 1977
