= La Celestina P... R... =

1965 film

- Directed by: Carlo Lizzani
- Starring: Assia Noris; Beba Lončar; Raffaella Carrà; Marilù Tolo; Venantino Venantini; Piero Mazzarella
- Cinematography: Oberdan Troiani
- Edited by: Mario Serandrei
- Music by: Piero Umiliani
- Release date: 1965
- Language: Italian

La Celestina P... R... is a 1965 Italian comedy film directed by Carlo Lizzani. It is loosely based on the Medieval novel La Celestina by Fernando de Rojas.

The film marked the film comeback of Assia Noris after a 15 years break; it is also her last film.

== Cast ==
- Assia Noris: Celestina
- Venantino Venantini: Carlo
- Massimo Serato: Marcello
- Piero Mazzarella: Moretti
- Franco Nero: Fabrizio
- Marilù Tolo: Silvana
- Beba Lončar: Luisella
- Raffaella Carrà: Bruna
- Goffredo Alessandrini: Montesti
- Daliah Lavi: Daniela
