= Alibi (1969 film) =

1969 film

- Film poster
- Directed by: Adolfo Celi; Vittorio Gassman; Luciano Lucignani
- Written by: Adolfo Celi; Sandro Continenza; Vittorio Gassman; Luciano Lucignani
- Produced by: Franco Cristaldi
- Starring: Vittorio Gassman
- Cinematography: Stelvio Massi
- Edited by: Mariano Arditi
- Music by: Ennio Morricone
- Release date: 13 February 1969
- Running time: 106 minutes
- Country: Italy
- Language: Italian

Alibi (Italian: L'alibi) is a 1969 Italian comedy film directed by Adolfo Celi and starring Vittorio Gassman.

== Cast ==
- Vittorio Gassman - Vittorio
- Adolfo Celi - Adolfo
- Luciano Lucignani - Luciano
- Tina Aumont - Filli
- Franco Giacobini - Luca
- Jovanna Knox - La contessa
- Ines Kummernus - Moglie di Adolfo
- Grande Otelo - Tranviere
- Marcia Rodriguez - Gracia
- Lina Sadun - Madre di Vittorio
- Vincenzo Sartini - Enrico
- Silvana Venturelli - Paola
- Alberto Moravia - himself
