= Kidnap (1974 film) =

1974 film

- Italian film poster
- Directed by: Giovanni Fago
- Screenplay by: Adriano Bolzoni; Giovanni Fago
- Story by: Adriano Bolzoni
- Produced by: Ottavio Oppo
- Starring: Henry Silva; Rada Rassimov; Philippe Leroy; Lia Tanzi; Gabriele Ferzetti
- Cinematography: Roberto Gerardi
- Edited by: Alberto Gallitti
- Music by: Piero Piccioni
- Production company: Produzioni Associate Delphos
- Distributed by: United Artists
- Release date: 1974
- Running time: 99 minutes
- Country: Italy
- Language: Italian

Kidnap (Italian: Fatevi vivi, la polizia non interverrà) is a 1974 Italian poliziottesco film. It stars actor Gabriele Ferzetti.

== Cast ==
- Henry Silva as Commissario Caprile
- Rada Rassimov as Marta
- Philippe Leroy as Il Professore
- Gabriele Ferzetti as Frank Salvatore
- Franco Diogene as Nino
- Lia Tanzi as Marisa
- Calisto Calisti as Mafioso
- Pino Ferrara: Mercuri
- Armando Brancia as Avvocato
- Loris Bazzocchi as Mafioso
- Paul Muller as Jimmy
- Fausta Avelli as Luisa Barsanti
- Luciano Bartoli as Pino
- Renato Pinciroli
- Rosita Torosh
