= Lia Tanzi =

Italian actress and television personality

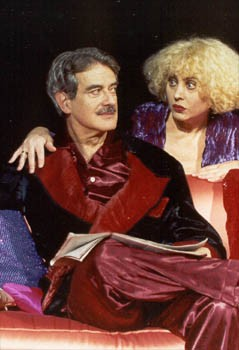
- Tanzi with Giuseppe Pambieri (2003)
- Born: 3 November 1948 (age 77); Buenos Aires, Argentina
- Occupation: actress

Lia Tanzi (born 3 November 1948) is an Italian actress and television personality.

== Life and career ==
Born in Buenos Aires to Italian parents, Tanzi moved to Parma at young age. She studied acting at the Drama School of the Piccolo Teatro in Milan where she met her future husband, the actor Giuseppe Pambieri. She is mainly active on stage, often together with Pambieri and with their daughter, Micol. Tanzi is also active in TV-series and films, mainly of comedic genre.

== Selected filmography ==
- Claretta and Ben (1973)
- The Violent Professionals (1973)
- High School Girl (1974)
- Poker in Bed (1974)
- Kidnap (1974)
- The Suspicious Death of a Minor (1975)
- Strip First, Then We Talk (1975)
- Al piacere di rivederla (1976)
- The Virgo, the Taurus and the Capricorn (1977)
- La stanza del vescovo (1977)
- Speed Cross (1980)
- Mia moglie è una strega (1980)
- Quando la coppia scoppia (1981)
- Bollenti spiriti (1981)
- Le ali della vita (2000)
