= Virginio Gazzolo =

Italian actor (1936–2026)

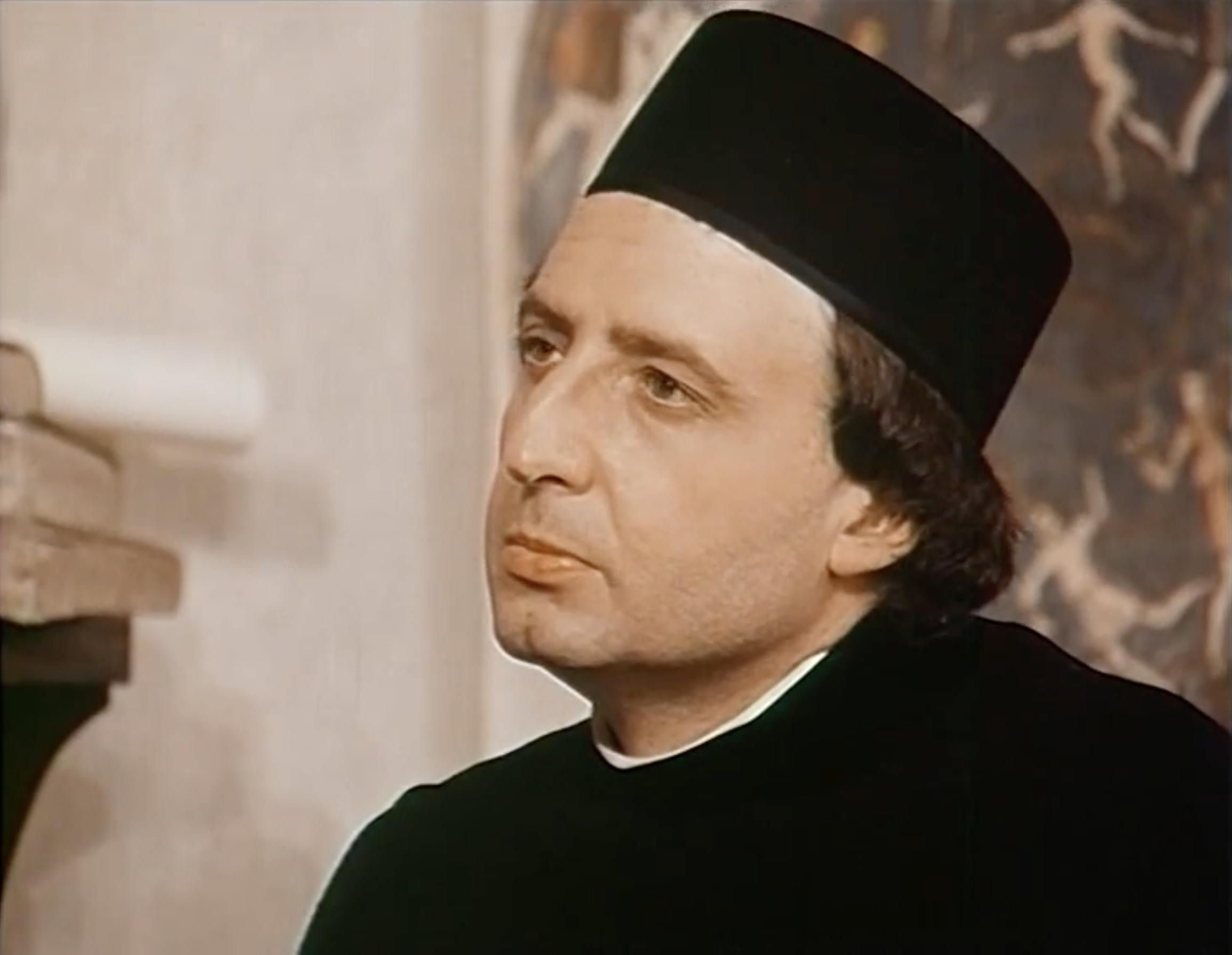
- Gazzolo in 1972 in The Age of the Medici
- Born: 19 November 1936; Rome, Italy
- Died: 19 August 2026 (aged 89); Monte Castello di Vibio, Italy
- Occupation: Actor

Virginio Gazzolo (19 November 1936 – 19 August 2026) was an Italian actor.

In addition to his numerous on-screen credits, he also specialised in dubbing.

Gazzolo died in Monte Castello di Vibio on 19 August 2026, at the age of 89.

== Filmography ==
- The Birds, the Bees and the Italians (1966)
- Day of Anger (1967)
- Fantabulous Inc. (1968)
- Deadly Inheritance (1969)
- Don't Torture a Duckling (1972)
- The Age of the Medici (1973)
