= Il segno del comando =

1971 film

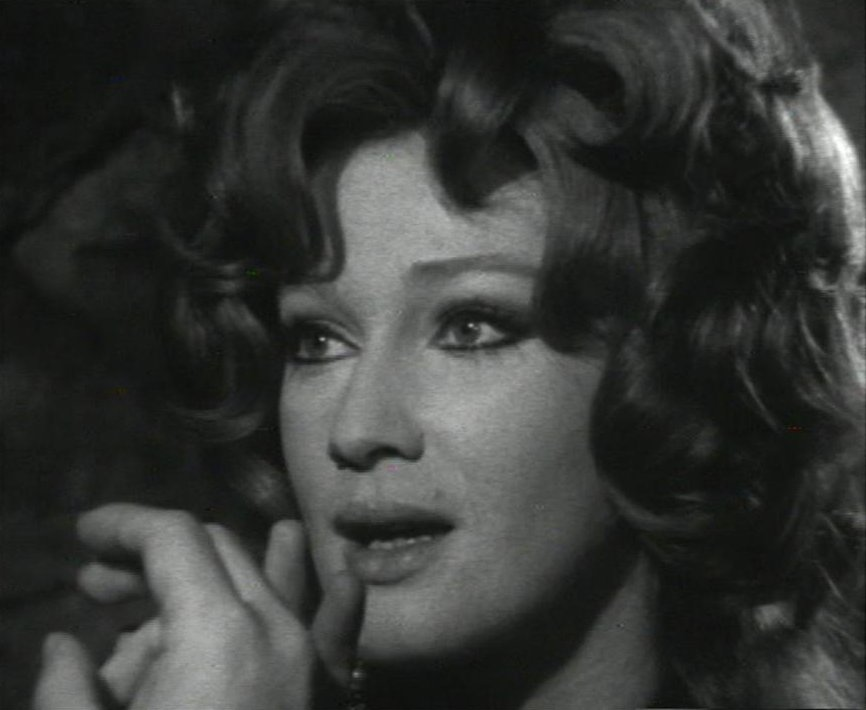
- Carla Gravina
- Created by: Flaminio Bollini; Dante Guardamagna
- Screenplay by: Giuseppe D'Agata; Flaminio Bollini; Dante Guardamagna; Lucio Mandarà
- Directed by: Daniele D'Anza
- Starring: Ugo Pagliai; Carla Gravina
- Composer: Romolo Grano
- Original language: Italian
- No. of episodes: 5

Production
- Cinematography: Marco Scarpelli
- Running time: 300 min.

Original release
- Network: Programma Nazionale
- Release: 1971

Il segno del comando (i.e. "The sign of the command") is a 1971 Italian giallo-fantasy television miniseries directed by Daniele D'Anza and starring Ugo Pagliai, Carla Gravina and Massimo Girotti. It was broadcast on Programma Nazionale. It was remade in 1992 by Giulio Questi.

== Main cast ==
- Ugo Pagliai as Lancelot Edward Forster
- Carla Gravina as Lucia
- Massimo Girotti as George Powell
- Carlo Hintermann as Lester Sullivan
- Rossella Falk as Olivia
- Paola Tedesco as Barbara
- Franco Volpi as Prince Raimondo Anchisi
- Augusto Mastrantoni as Col. Marco Tagliaferri
- Angiola Baggi as Giuliana
- Andrea Checchi as Inspector Bonsanti
- Silvia Monelli as Miss Giannelli
- Roberto Bruni as Prospero Barengo
- Amedeo Girardi as Paselli
- Laura Belli as Powell's Friend
- Luciana Negrini as Powell's Friend
- Adriano Micantoni as Maresciallo
