= Evil Thoughts =

- Directed by: Ugo Tognazzi
- Written by: Antonio Leonviola; Ugo Tognazzi
- Produced by: Edmondo Amati
- Starring: Ugo Tognazzi; Edwige Fenech; Paolo Bonacelli; Piero Mazzarella; Mircha Carven; Yanti Somer; Mara Venier; Laura Bonaparte; Veruschka; Orazio Orlando; Massimo Serato
- Cinematography: Alfio Contini
- Edited by: Nino Baragli
- Music by: Armando Trovajoli
- Release date: 1976
- Language: Italian

Evil Thoughts, (Italian title: Cattivi pensieri, also known as Who Mislaid My Wife?) is a 1976 Italian comedy film written, directed and starred by Ugo Tognazzi.

== Plot ==
The Milanese lawyer Mario Marani, due to fog at the airport, is forced to return home because his flight was canceled. At home, he finds his wife Francesca half asleep and realizes that a person is hiding in the closet of shotguns. Convinced that he is the lover of Francesca, he closes the utility room and the next morning he departs with his wife for work purposes, continuing to mull over the alleged infidelity of his wife.

== Cast ==
- Ugo Tognazzi as Mario Marani
- Edwige Fenech as Francesca Marani
- Paolo Bonacelli as Antonio Marani
- Piero Mazzarella as portinaio
- Yanti Somer as Paola
- Mara Venieras Miss Bocconi
- Luc Merenda as Recrosio
- Veruschka: lover of Mario
- Laura Bonaparte as lover of Recrosio
- Mircha Carven as Lorenzo Macchi
- Orazio Orlando as lawyer Borderò
- Massimo Serato as Carlo Bocconi
- Pietro Brambilla as Duccio
- Beppe Viola as police commissioner
- Guido Nicheli as Ospite
- Riccardo Tognazzi: Gino

== See also ==
- List of Italian films of 1976
