= Renzo Ricci =

Italian actor and theatre director

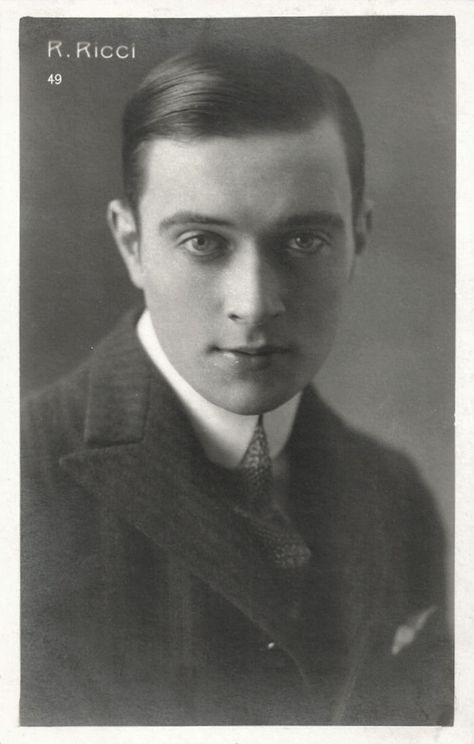
- Ricci c. 1920
- Born: 27 September 1899; Florence, Tuscany, Italy
- Died: 20 October 1978 (aged 79); Milan, Lombardy, Italy
- Occupation: Actor
- Years active: 1931–1978 (film)
- Spouses: Margherita Bagni (m. 1923; died 1960) Eva Magni (m. 1961)
- Children: Nora Ricci

Renzo Ricci (27 September 1899 – 20 October 1978) was an Italian stage and film actor. He was also a noted theatre director. Ricci played the title role in Roberto Rossellini's 1961 film Garibaldi.

== Life and career ==
Born in Florence, Ricci started acting in a local dramatic society while still being a student of the Istituto tecnico, and made his professional debut in 1915, with the stage company held by Emma Gramatica. Mainly active on stage, he was a member of several companies, notably the Giorgio Strehler's company at the Piccolo Teatro in Milan. In 1957 he won the San Genesio Prize for his performance in Eugene O'Neill's Long Day's Journey into Night. He was married with actress Margherita Bagni with whom he had a daughter, Eleonora "Nora", also an actress. After his first wife's death he married his lover, another stage actress, Eva Magni.

== Selected filmography ==
- Before the Jury (1931)
- La Wally (1932)
- Nini Falpala (1933)
- Disturbance (1942)
- Nero and the Burning of Rome (1953)
- Casta Diva (1954)
- Garibaldi (1961)
- I am Semiramis (1963)
- Sandra (1965)
