= Nora Ricci =

Italian actress

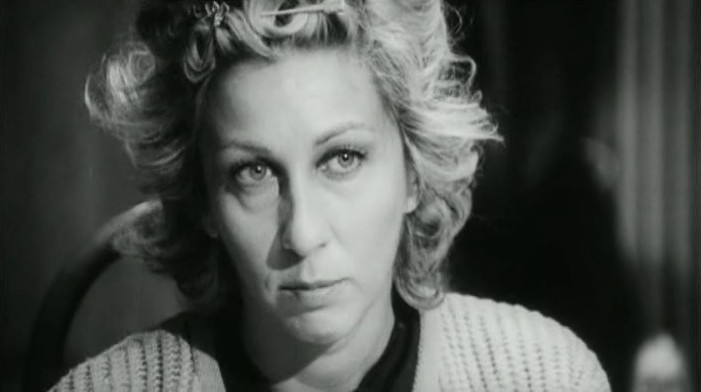
- Ricci in The Birds, the Bees and the Italians (1966)
- Born: Eleonora Ricci; 19 July 1924; Viareggio, Italy
- Died: 16 April 1976 (aged 51); Rome, Italy
- Occupation: Actress
- Years active: 1951–1974
- Spouse: Vittorio Gassman (m. 1944; div. 1952)
- Children: Paola Gassman
- Parent(s): Renzo Ricci; Margherita Bagni
- Relatives: Ermete Zacconi (step-grandfather); Ines Cristina (grandmother); Ambrogio Bagni (grandfather); Olinto Cristina (great-uncle)

Eleonora Ricci (19 July 1924 – 16 April 1976) was an Italian actress.

== Life and career ==
Born in Viareggio, Tuscany, Ricci was the daughter of actors Renzo Ricci and Margherita Bagni. Ermete Zacconi was her mother's stepfather. At 17 years old, she moved to Rome to enroll in the Academy of Dramatic Arts, where she met Vittorio Gassman, who became her husband in 1944 and from whom she separated shortly after the birth of her only child, actress Paola Gassman (born June 1945), divorcing Vittorio in 1952 so he could marry Shelley Winters.

Ricci made her professional debut in 1943, in the theatrical company led by Laura Adani. During her career she was active on stage, radio, television and in films, notably working with Luchino Visconti, Pietro Germi, Liliana Cavani. She died after a long illness, aged 51.

== Filmography ==
Films and television
Year	Title	Role	Notes
1951	Bellissima	La Stiratrice	
1954	The Doctor of the Mad	Rosina	
1955	Motivo in maschera	Unknown	
1955	Eighteen Years Old	College assistant	Cameo appearance
1961	A Very Private Affair	Nora	Uncredited
1962	The Shortest Day	Train attendant	Cameo appearance
1964	Giuseppe Verdi	Unknown	
1966	The Birds, the Bees and the Italians	Gilda Bisigato	
1967	The Witches	Secretary	Segment: "Strega bruciata viva"
1967	La fiera della vanità	Mrs. O'Dowd	Episode "3" and "4"
1968	The Libertine	Mimmi's mother	
1969	Metti, una sera a cena	First Actress	
1969	The Damned	The Governess	
1970	FBI – Francesco Bertolazzi investigatore	Princess Ippolita	Episode: "Ulisse's Return"
1971	Come un uragano	Kitty Ryan	Miniseries
1971	Roma Bene	Donna Serena	
1971	Death in Venice	The Governess	
1972	Sorelle Materassi	Giselda	Miniseries
1973	Ludwig	Countess Ida Ferenczy	
1974	Il commissario De Vincenzi	Madame Firmino	Episode: "Il mistero delle tre orchidee"
1974	The Night Porter	Mrs. Holler	
1974	Il mondo di Alice	The Chef	
1974	Anna Karenina	Lidia Ivanovna	Miniseries

Stage
Year	Title	Role	Place
2 October 1945	La macchina da scrivere	The Post Lady	Teatro Eliseo, Rome
