= Piero Mazzarella =

Italian actor

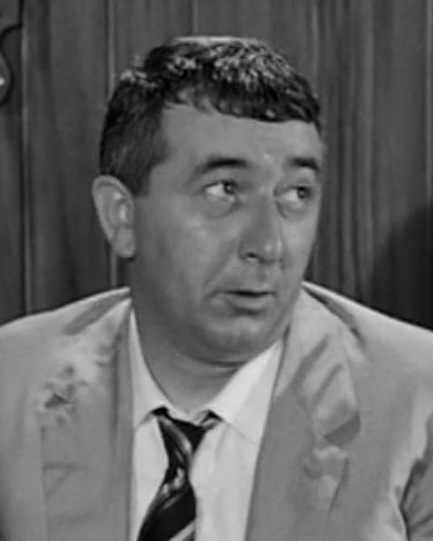
- Piero Mazzarella in Corpse for the Lady (1964)
- Born: 2 March 1928; Caresana, Italy
- Died: 25 October 2013 (aged 85); Milan, Italy
- Occupation: Actor
- Years active: 1962–2008

Piero Mazzarella (2 March 1928 – 25 October 2013) was an Italian actor who became legendary for his comic performances delivered in the Milanese dialect. He appeared in more than thirty films from 1962 to 2008.

== Selected filmography ==
| Year | Title | Role | Notes |
|---|---|---|---|
| 2009 | Torno a vivere da solo | | |
| 1983 | Un povero ricco | | |
| 1981 | Sweet Pea | | |
| 1977 | The Bishop's Bedroom | | |
| 1976 | Evil Thoughts | | |
| 1970 | Lonely Hearts | | |
| 1968 | Bandits in Milan | | |
| 1965 | La Celestina P... R... | | |
| 1964 | Corpse for the Lady | | |
| 1963 | Obiettivo ragazze | | |
| 1962 | Appuntamento in Riviera | | |
