= Olga Villi =

Italian actress (1922–1989)

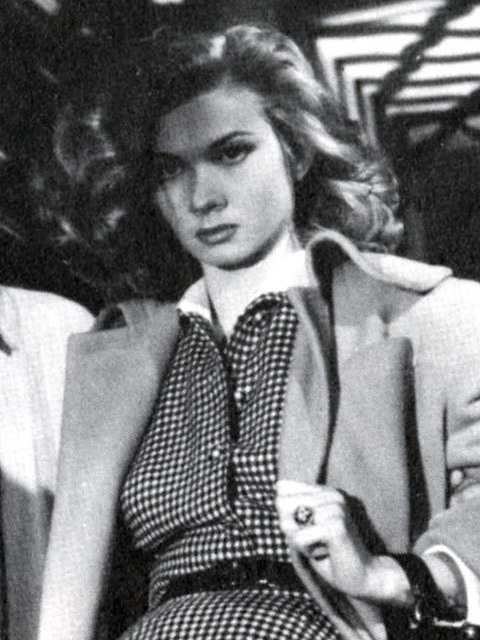
- Villi in Letter at Dawn (1948)
- Born: Olga Villani; 20 January 1922; Suzzara, Mantua, Italy
- Died: 12 August 1989 (aged 67); Rapallo, Italy
- Occupation: Actress
- Years active: 1943–1975 (film/television)

Olga Villi (20 January 1922 – 12 August 1989), was an Italian model and actress.

== Life and career ==
Born in Suzzara, Mantua as Olga Villani, Villi began to work, only twelve years old, as a saleswoman and seamstress at the Milanese fashion house Biki.

A few years later her employer hired her as a model; noted by Macario, she was hired by him in 1942 for the rivista-operetta Il grillo al castello, where she had to act, sing and dance. Thanks to the success of the show Villi became one of the most quoted soubrettes of the period, working with Anna Magnani, Nino Taranto and Alberto Sordi, and in mid-1940s she also starred in several drama plays, working among others with Luchino Visconti, Alessandro Blasetti and Giorgio Strehler.

Also active in films and on television, in 1967 Villi won a Nastro d'Argento for Best Supporting Actress thanks to her performance in Pietro Germi's The Birds, the Bees and the Italians. After having announced her retirement in 1972, she came back on stage in 1984.

She was married to the nobleman Raimondo Lanza di Trabia until his death in 1954. Villi died after a long illness in Rapallo, where she lived for about thirty years.

== Selected filmography ==
- Macario Against Zagomar (1944)
- Christmas at Camp 119 (1948)
- Letter at Dawn (1948)
- Yvonne of the Night (1949)
- Four Red Roses (1952)
- Half a Century of Song (1952)
- Adriana Lecouvreur (1955)
- Sex Quartet (1966)
- The Birds, the Bees and the Italians (1966)
- Il fischio al naso (1967)
