= Margherita Bagni =

Italian actress (1902–1960)

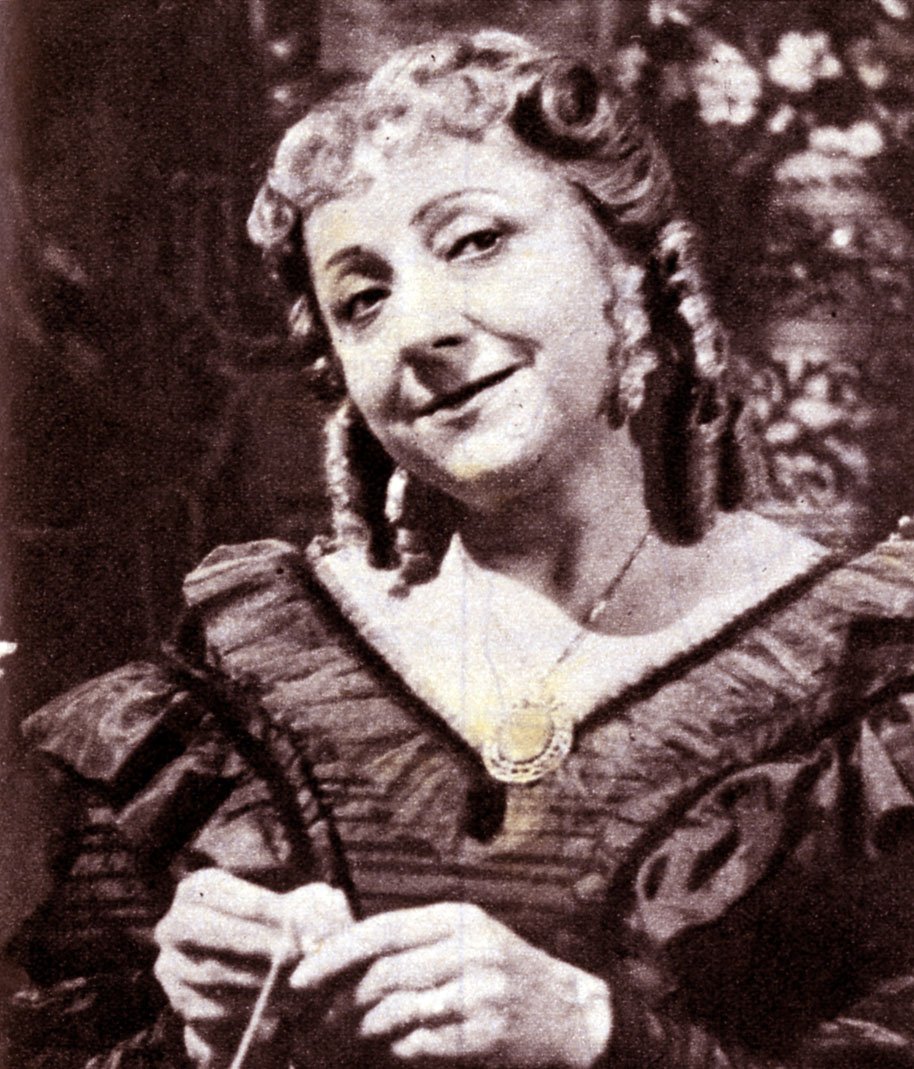
- Bagni in 1958
- Born: Margherita Maria Bagna; 21 February 1902; Turin, Kingdom of Italy
- Died: 2 July 1960 (aged 58); Rome, Italy
- Occupation: Actress
- Years active: 1918–1959
- Spouse: Renzo Ricci (m. 1923)
- Children: Nora Ricci
- Parent(s): Ambrogio Bagni; Ines Cristina Zacconi; Ermete Zacconi (stepfather)
- Relatives: Olinto Cristina (uncle); Vittorio Gassman (former son-in-law); Paola Gassman (granddaughter)

Margherita Bagni (pseudonym of Margherita Maria Bagna; 21 February 1902 – 2 July 1960) was an Italian actress and voice actress. She appeared in 37 films between 1918 and 1959.

== Biography ==
Daughter of actress Ines Cristina and prompter Ambrogio Bagni (pseudonym of Ambrogio Bagna), Bagni entered at very young age the stage company of her stepfather Ermete Zacconi. After having married Renzo Ricci, in 1925 she formed with him the company Ricci-Bagni. She made her film debut at 15, in Gli spettri, but her real film career began in mid-1930s. In cinema she was mainly a character actress, and at the same time she was also very active as a voice actress. She also appeared on several television series of great success.

Her daughter Eleonora "Nora" was an actress and she also was the first wife of Vittorio Gassman.

== Partial filmography ==
- Thirty Seconds of Love (1936)
- Adam's Tree (1936)
- The Two Sergeants (1936)
- Doctor Antonio (1937)
- I, His Father (1939)
- Eternal Melodies (1940)
- The Last Dance (1941)
- The Queen of Navarre (1942)
- The Jester's Supper (1942)
- Christmas at Camp 119 (1948)
- Abbiamo vinto! (1951)
- Operation Mitra (1951)
- Four Red Roses (1951)
- Le infedeli (1953)
- I Chose Love (1953)
- If You Won a Hundred Million (1953)
- The Boatman of Amalfi (1954)
- Too Bad She's Bad (1954)
- A Slice of Life (1954)
- Lucky to Be a Woman (1956)
- Prepotenti più di prima (1959)
