= Carlo Lizzani =

Italian film director, screenwriter and critic (1922-2013)

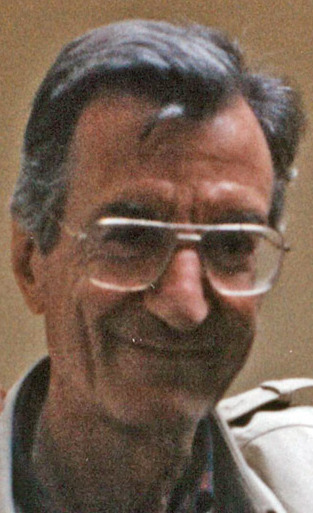
- Lizzani (left) on the set of Celluloide (Rome, 1996)
- Born: 3 April 1922; Rome, Italy
- Died: 5 October 2013 (aged 91); Rome, Italy
- Other name: Lee W. Beaver
- Occupations: Film director; Screenwriter
- Years active: 1949–2013

Carlo Lizzani (3 April 1922 – 5 October 2013) was an Italian film director, screenwriter and critic.

== Biography ==
Born in Rome, before World War II Lizzani worked as a scenarist on such films as Roberto Rossellini's Germany Year Zero, Alberto Lattuada's The Mill on the Po (both 1948), and Giuseppe De Santis' Bitter Rice (1949), for which he received an Academy Award nomination for Best Original Story.

After directing documentaries, he debuted as a feature director with the admired World War II drama Attention! Bandits! (1951). Respected for his awarded drama Chronicle of Poor Lovers (1954), he has proven a solid director of genre films, notably crime films such as The Violent Four (1968) and Crazy Joe (1974) or crime-comedy Roma Bene (1971). His film Gold of Rome (1961) examined events around the final deportation of the Jews of Rome and the Roman roundup, grande razzia, of October 1943. For his 1968 film Bandits in Milan, he won a David di Donatello award as best director and a Nastro d'Argento award for best screenplay.

Lizzani worked frequently for Italian television in the 1980s and supervised the Venice International Film Festival for four editions, from 1979 to 1982. In 1994 Lizzani was a member of the jury at the Berlin Film Festival.

For his 1996 film Celluloide, which deals with the making of Rome, Open City, he received another David di Donatello award for his screenplay.

While preparing for the film L'orecchio del potere ("The Ear of Power", a project he cultivated since the late nineties with the title Operazione Appia Antica), Lizzani committed suicide in Rome at the age of 91, when he jumped from the balcony of his apartment in Via dei Gracchi on 5 October 2013. On 10 October his coffin was transferred to a room in the Capitol that was set up as a funeral home, and the following day the civil funeral was held. Later, his body was transferred to the Flaminian cemetery for cremation.

== Legacy ==
In 2014 his family established the Lizzani Prize in his honor, which became one of the collaterals of the Venice Film Festival and is destined for Italian exhibitors that have given more space to quality cinema in cinemas.

== Personal life ==
Since 1949 he was married to painter Edith Bieber, whom he met in Berlin during the filming of the Roberto Rossellini film Germania anno zero.

== Filmography ==
- The Sun Still Rises (1946)
- Viaggio al sud, documentary (1949)
- Via Emilia Km 147, documentary (1949)
- Nel Mezzogiorno qualcosa è cambiato, documentary (1950)
- Modena, città dell'Emilia Rossa, documentary (1950)
- Attention! Bandits! (1951)
- L'amore che si paga, episode of the film L'amore in città (1953)
- At the Edge of the City, coregia di Massimo Mida (1953)
- Chronicle of Poor Lovers (1953)
- Human Torpedoes, uncredited – Antonio Leonviola and Marc-Antonio Bragadin (1954)
- Lo svitato (1955)
- La muraglia cinese (1958)
- Esterina (1959)
- The Hunchback of Rome (1960)
- Carabiniere a cavallo (1961)
- Gold of Rome (1961)
- La vita agra (1963)
- The Verona Trial (1963)
- Amori pericolosi (1964)
- La Celestina P... R... (1964)
- The Dirty Game (1965)
- Thrilling (segment "L'autostrada del Sole", 1965)
- Requiescant (1966)
- Wake Up and Die (1966)
- The Hills Run Red (1967)
- Bandits in Milan (1968)
- The Bandit (1969)
- The Tough and the Mighty (1969)
- Love and Anger (1969)
- Roma Bene (1971)
- Black Turin (1972)
- Crazy Joe (1973)
- Last Days of Mussolini (1974)
- Storie di vita e di malavita (1975)
- San Babila-8 P.M. (1976)
- Kleinhoff hotel (1977)
- Fontamara (1980)
- The House of the Yellow Carpet (1983)
- Mamma Ebe (1985)
- Un'isola (1986)
- Dear Gorbachev (1988)
- 12 registi per 12 città (1989) documentary
- The Wicked (1991)
- Celluloide (1996)
- Luchino Visconti (1999) documentary
- Cesare Zavattini (2002) documentary
- Napoli Napoli Napoli (2006) documentary
- Agusta-Westland, un primato italiano (2007) documentary
- Hotel Meina (2007)
