= Daniele D'Anza =

Italian director, playwright and screenwriter

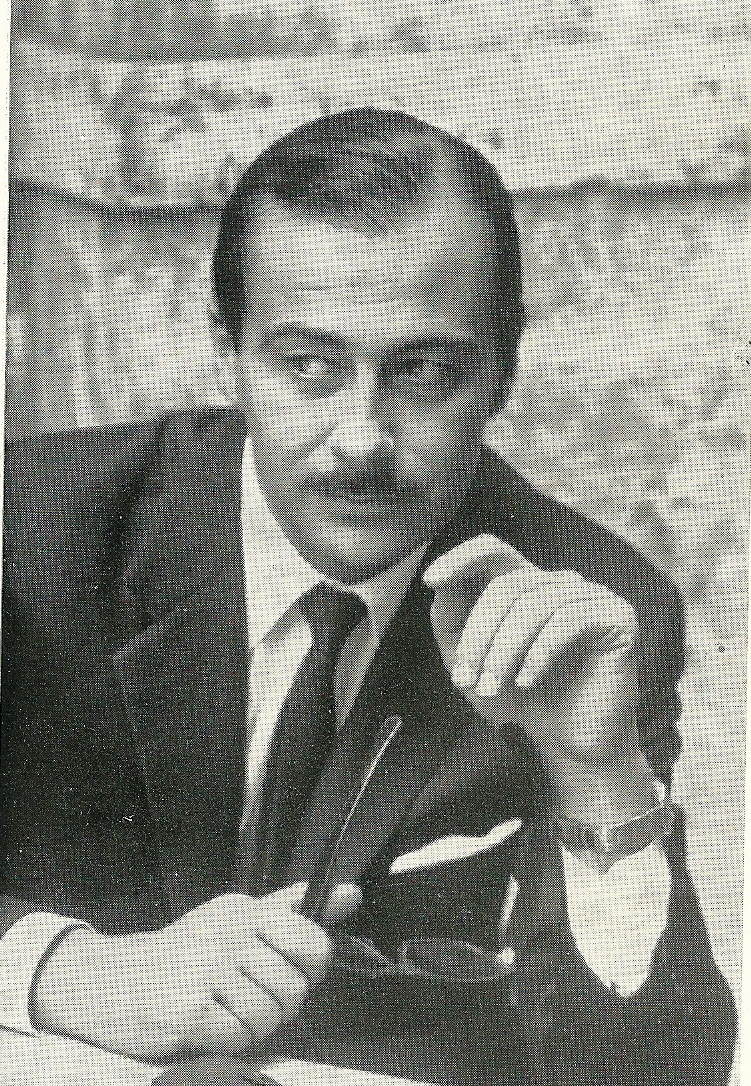
- Born: 20 April 1922; Milan, Lombardy, Italy
- Died: 12 April 1984 (aged 61); Rome, Lazio, Italy
- Occupations: Director; Screenwriter
- Years active: 1947-1984 (film)

Daniele D'Anza (20 April 1922 – 12 April 1984) was an Italian director, playwright and screenwriter.

== Life and career ==
Born in Milan, D'Anza started his career on stage, in which he is best known for the direction of the antimilitarist play Venticinque metri di fango that he presented in Milan in 1946, raising several controversities as well as critical appreciation. Another of his works, the rivista Tempo di musica, a satire of Italian history from the 1930s to the 1950s, was heavily censored, being first banned and later allowed only after having received heavy cuts.

He is regarded as a pioneer of Italian television, for which he worked since the early 1950s, when RAI started experimental broadcasting before starting the regular TV service. He directed several successful TV-series, in particular Il segno del comando (1971) and L'amaro caso della Baronessa di Carini (1976). His last work, the TV miniseries La ragazza dell'addio was broadcast on RAI posthumously, two months after his death. He was also active on films, notably working on the screenplay of Michelangelo Antonioni's Story of a Love Affair (1950).

== Personal life ==
D'Anza was first married to Edith Malanesan, a British woman, and they had a daughter, Cristina. The couple separated (divorce not yet existing in Italy) in 1950 and in 1967 he was prosecuted for concubinage with the actress Luisella Boni, with whom he had had a second daughter, Vittoria Michaela.

== Selected filmography ==
=== Screenwriter ===
- Story of a Love Affair (1950)
- The Two Sergeants (1951)
- The Temptress (1952)
- Tom Toms of Mayumba (1955)
- The Wanderers (1956)

=== Director ===
- The Adventures of Nicholas Nickleby (1958, TV series)
- Call Girls of Rome (1960)
- Il segno del comando (1971, TV series)
- Extra (1976)
- Madame Bovary (1978, TV series)
- I racconti fantastici di Edgar Allan Poe (1979, TV series)
