= Luchino Visconti (film) =

- Directed by: Carlo Lizzani
- Written by: Luigi Filippo D'Amico; Carlo Lizzani
- Produced by: Laura Pettini; Silvia Pettini
- Starring: Claudia Cardinale
- Narrated by: Carlo Lizzani
- Cinematography: Bruno Di Virgilio
- Edited by: Danilo Perticara
- Music by: Franco Mannino
- Release date: 1999
- Running time: 60
- Country: Italy
- Language: Italian

Luchino Visconti is a 1999 Italian documentary film about the filmmaker Luchino Visconti and directed by Carlo Lizzani. It stars Claudia Cardinale.
