= List of Italian films of 1959 =

A list of films produced in Italy in 1959 (see 1959 in film):

Title	Director	Cast	Genre	Notes
1959
A qualcuna piace calvo	Mario Amendola	Gisela Sofio, Antonio Cifariello, Magali Noel	Comedy	
Adolescenza	Francesco Maselli	–	Short film	
Agi Murad il diavolo bianco	Riccardo Freda	Steve Reeves; Giorgia Moll	Adventure	Based on Tolstoy's Hadji Murat
Agosto, donne mie non vi conosco	Guido Malatesta	Lorella De Luca; Raffaele Pisu	Comedy	
Annibale	Edgar G. Ulmer; Carlo Ludovico Bragaglia	Victor Mature; Gabriele Ferzetti	Historical drama	
Arrangiatevi!	Mauro Bolognini	Peppino De Filippo; Totò; Laura Adani	Comedy	One of 100 Italian films to be saved
Arriva la banda	Tanio Boccia	Maria Fiore; Matteo Spinola	Comedy	
Avventura a Capri	Giuseppe Lipartiti	Maurizio Arena; Alessandra Panaro; Nino Taranto	Comedy	
Avventura in città	Roberto Savarese	Luisella Boni; Daniela Calvino; Nick Pagano	Romance	
The Big Chief	Henri Verneuil	Fernandel, Gino Cervi, Florence Blot	Comedy	Co-production with France
Brigliadoro	Angio Zane	Dario Cipani; Alessandro Zane; Ignazio Colnaghi	Adventure	
Caltiki – The Immortal Monster	Riccardo Freda; Mario Bava	John Merivale; Didi Perego; Daniela Rocca	Science fiction horror	Italian-French co-production
Carosello spagnolo	Gian Rocco	–	Documentary	
Caterina Sforza, la leonessa di Romagna	Giorgio Walter Chili	Virna Lisi; Carlo Giuffrè; Sergio Fantoni	Historical drama	
Cerasella	Raffaello Matarazzo	Claudia Mori; Mario Girotti; Luigi De Filippo	Teen comedy	
Checkerboard	Claude Bernard-Aubert	Grégoire Aslan, Toto Bissainthe, Roger Blin	Drama	Co-production with France
Ciao, ciao bambina!	Sergio Grieco	Elsa Martinelli; Antonio Cifariello	Comedy	
Costa Azzurra (Wild Cats on the Beach)	Vittorio Sala	Alberto Sordi; Giovanna Ralli; Elsa Martinelli	Comedy	Co-production with France
Destinazione Sanremo	Domenico Paolella	Yvonne Monlaur; Gabriele Tinti	Musicarello	
Due selvaggi a corte	Ferdinando Baldi	Leonora Ruffo; Fiorella Mari; Erno Crisa	Adventure	
Ercole e la regina di Lidia (Hercules Unchained)	Pietro Francisci	Steve Reeves; Sylva Koscina; Sylvia Lopez	Sword-and-sandal	Co-production with France
Erode il grande (Herod the Great)	Victor Tourjansky	Edmund Purdom; Sylvia Lopez	Historical drama	Co-production with France
Estate violenta	Valerio Zurlini	Jean-Louis Trintignant; Jacqueline Sassard; Eleonora Rossi Drago	Drama, War	Winner of two Nastro d'Argento
Esterina	Carlo Lizzani	Carla Gravina; Geoffrey Horne; Domenico Modugno	Drama	
Europa dall'alto	Severino Casara	–	Documentary	
Europa di notte	Alessandro Blasetti	–	Documentary	
Fantasmi e ladri	Giorgio Simonelli	Tina Pica; Mario Riva	Comedy	
Ferdinando I, re di Napoli	Gianni Franciolini	Peppino De Filippo; Eduardo De Filippo; Nino Taranto	Comedy	
Festa a Pamplona	Gianfranco Mingozzi	–	Documentary	
Giuditta e Oloferne (Head of a Tyrant)	Fernando Cerchio	Massimo Girotti; Isabelle Corey	Historical drama	Co-production with France
Gli ultimi giorni di Pompei	Mario Bonnard; Sergio Leone	Steve Reeves; Christine Kaufmann	Sword-and-sandal	Co-production with Spain and West Germany
Gli uomini del lago	Gillo Pontecorvo	–	Short documentary	
Gli uomini e i tori	Gianfranco Mingozzi	–	Short documentary	
Guardatele ma non toccatele	Mario Mattoli	Ugo Tognazzi; Caprice Chantal; Johnny Dorelli	Comedy	
Guinguette	Jean Delannoy	Zizi Jeanmaire, Jean-Claude Pascal, Paul Meurisse	Comedy drama	Co-production with France
I cattivi vanno in paradiso	Lorenza Mazzetti; Dionisio Horne	Piero Lulli; Claudio Liberatore; Walter Moresi	Drama	
I cavalieri del diavolo	Siro Marcellini	Frank Latimore; Anthony Steffen; Emma Danieli	Adventure	
I dimenticati	Vittorio De Seta	–	Short documentary	
I ditteri	Alberto Ancilotto	–	Short	
I ladri	Lucio Fulci	Totò; Armando Calvo; Giovanna Ralli	Comedy	Co-production with Spain
I mafiosi	Roberto Mauri	Erno Crisa; Wandisa Guida; Philippe Hersent	Drama	
I magliari	Francesco Rosi	Alberto Sordi; Renato Salvatori; Belinda Lee	Drama	One of 100 Italian films to be saved
I ragazzi	Giacomo Vaccari	Evi Maltagliati; Alberto Lupo; Paolo Carlini	TV movie	
I ragazzi dei Parioli	Sergio Corbucci	Raf Mattioli; Alessandra Panaro; Ennio Girolami	Drama	
I Reali di Francia (Attack of the Moors)	Mario Costa	Chelo Alonso; Rik Battaglia; Gérard Landry	Adventure	
I tartassati (The Overtaxed)	Stefano Vanzina	Totò; Aldo Fabrizi; Louis de Funès	Comedy	
Il cavaliere del castello maledetto (Cavalier in Devil's Castle)	Mario Costa	Massimo Serato; Irène Tunc; Luisella Boni	Swashbuckler film	
Il figlio del corsaro rosso (The Son of the Red Corsair)	Primo Zeglio	Lex Barker; Sylvia Lopez; Vira Silenti	Adventure	
Il generale della Rovere	Roberto Rossellini	Vittorio De Sica; Sandra Milo	Drama	Golden Lion winner. Academy Award nominee for best script.
Il magistrato	Luigi Zampa	José Suárez; Jacqueline Sassard; Claudia Cardinale	Drama	Co-production with Spain and France
Il mondo dei miracoli	Luigi Capuano	Virna Lisi; Jacques Sernas; Marisa Merlini	Drama	
Il moralista	Giorgio Bianchi	Alberto Sordi; Vittorio De Sica; Franca Valeri	Comedy	
Il nemico di mia moglie	Gianni Puccini	Marcello Mastroianni; Giovanna Ralli	Comedy	
Il padrone delle ferriere	Anton Giulio Majano	António Vilar; Virna Lisi	Drama	Co-production with Spain
Il povero fornaretto di Venezia	Mario Landi	Gabriele Antonini; Mario Feliciani; Lydia Alfonsi	TV movie	
Il raccomandato di ferro	Marcello Baldi	Mario Riva; Franca Marzi; Alessandra Panaro	Comedy	
Il tempo si è fermato	Ermanno Olmi	Natale Rossi; Roberto Seveso; Paolo Quadrubbi	Drama	
Il terrore dei barbari (Goliath and the Barbarians)	–	Steve Reeves; Chelo Alonso; Bruce Cabot	Sword-and-sandal	
Il terrore dell'Oklahoma	Mario Amendola	Maurizio Arena; Delia Scala; Alberto Bonucci	Western comedy	
Il vedovo	Dino Risi	Alberto Sordi; Franca Valeri	Commedia all'italiana	
Il vendicatore	William Dieterle	John Forsythe; Rosanna Schiaffino; Paul Dahlke	Historical drama	Co-production with Yugoslavia. Based on Dubrovsky by Alexander Pushkin
India: Matri Bhumi	Roberto Rossellini	–	Documentary	Entered into the 1st Moscow International Film Festival
Juke box urli d'amore	Mauro Morassi	Mario Carotenuto; Marisa Merlini; Karin Baal	Musicarello	
Kapò	Gillo Pontecorvo	Susan Strasberg; Laurent Terzieff; Emmanuelle Riva	WWII drama	Co-production with France. Academy Award nominee
L'altro uomo	Enrico Colosimo	Franco Volpi; Margherita Bagni; Gabriella Andreini	TV movie	
L'amico del giaguaro (The Friend of the Jaguar)	Giuseppe Bennati	Walter Chiari; Isabelle Corey; Carlo Romano	Comedy	
L'arciere nero	Piero Pierotti	Gérard Landry; Federica Ranchi; Livio Lorenzon	Adventure	
L'impiegato	Gianni Puccini	Nino Manfredi	Comedy	
L'ultimo formicchiere	Renzo Ragazzi	–	Short	
La battaglia di Maratona (The Giant of Marathon)	Jacques Tourneur; Mario Bava	Steve Reeves; Mylène Demongeot	Sword-and-sandal	Co-produced with France
La cambiale	Camillo Mastrocinque	Totò; Ugo Tognazzi; Vittorio Gassman	Comedy	
La cento chilometri	Giulio Petroni	Massimo Girotti; Mario Carotenuto; Riccardo Garrone	Comedy	
La congiura dei Borgia	Antonio Racioppi	Frank Latimore; Constance Smith; Gisèle Gallois	Historical drama	
La costruzione dell'acquadotto Ischia-Procida	Fausto Saraceni	–	Documentary	
La duchessa di Santa Lucia	Roberto Bianchi Montero	Tina Pica; Lorella De Luca; Raimondo Vianello	Comedy	
La grande guerra (The Great War)	Mario Monicelli	Alberto Sordi; Vittorio Gassman; Silvana Mangano	WWI comedy-drama	Golden Lion winner. One of 100 Italian films to be saved
La legge (Where the Hot Wind Blows)	Jules Dassin	Gina Lollobrigida; Pierre Brasseur; Marcello Mastroianni	–	Co-production with France
La luce sul monte	Mario Costa; Rinaldo Dal Fabbro	–	Documentary	
La notte brava (Bad Girls Don't Cry)	Mauro Bolognini	Rosanna Schiaffino; Elsa Martinelli; Laurent Terzieff	Drama	Written and adapted from his own novel by Pier Paolo Pasolini
La peccatrice del deserto (Desert Desperadoes)	Steve Sekely	Ruth Roman; Akim Tamiroff; Alan Furlan	Biblical drama	Co-production with the USA
La pica sul Pacifico	Roberto Bianchi Montero	Tina Pica; Elke Sommer; Memmo Carotenuto	Comedy	
La prima notte (Venetian Honeymoon)	Alberto Cavalcanti	Martine Carol; Vittorio De Sica; Philippe Nicaud	Romantic comedy	Co-production with France
La sceriffa	Roberto Bianchi Montero	Tina Pica; Ugo Tognazzi	Western comedy	
La scimitarra del Saraceno (The Pirate and the Slave Girl)	Piero Pierotti	Lex Barker; Chelo Alonso; Massimo Serato	Adventure	
La storia delle invenzioni	Bruno Bozzetto	–	Short Documentary; Animation	
La tarantella di Pulcinella	Giulio Gianini; Emanuele Luzzati	–	Short; Animation	
La vigilia di mezza estate	Gian Vittorio Baldi	–	Short Documentary	
Le cameriere	Carlo Ludovico Bragaglia	Giovanna Ralli; Andrea Checchi; Valeria Moriconi	Comedy	
Le donne ci tengono assai	Antonio Amendola	Pierre Cressoy; Mara Berni; Carlo Campanini	Comedy	
Le legioni di Cleopatra	Vittorio Cottafavi	Linda Cristal; Ettore Manni; Georges Marchal	Adventure, Drama, Romance	Co-production with France & Spain
Le notti dei Teddy Boys	Leopoldo Savona	Alessandra Panaro; Ennio Girolami; Corrado Pani	Drama	
Le notti di Lucrezia Borgia	Sergio Grieco	Belinda Lee; Jacques Sernas; Arnoldo Foà	Historical drama	
Le sorprese dell'amore	Luigi Comencini	Dorian Gray; Walter Chiari; Anna Maria Ferrero	Romantic comedy	
Le legioni di Cleopatra	Vittorio Cottafavi	Linda Cristal; Ettore Manni; Georges Marchal	Adventure, Drama, Romance	Co-production with France & Spain
Lettera da El Alamein	Enrico Fulchignoni	–	Short	
Lettere dei condannati a morte	Mario Monicelli	–	Drama	
Lupi nell'abisso (Wolves of the Deep)	Silvio Amadio	Massimo Girotti; Folco Lulli; Jean-Marc Bory	War film	Entered into the 9th Berlin International Film Festival
Maigret and the Saint-Fiacre Case	Jean Delannoy	Jean Gabin, Valentine Tessier, Michel Auclair	Crime	Co-production with France
Malinconico autunno	Raffaello Matarazzo	Amedeo Nazzari; Yvonne Sanson; Mercedes Monterrey	Drama	Co-production with Spain
Mantelli e spade insanguinate	Nathan Juran; Frank McDonald	Jeffrey Stone; Paul Campbell; Sebastian Cabot	Drama	Based on The Three Musketeers, edited from episodes of the TV series I tre moschettieri
Moana	Serge Arnoux; Bernard Gorki	Turi Vasile (narrator)	Documentary	
Monetine da cinque lire	Claudio Fino	Dario Fo; Nino Castelnuovo	TV movie	
Morte di un amico	Franco Rossi	Spyros Focas; Gianni Garko; Didi Perego	Drama	
Napoli è tutta una canzone	Ignazio Ferronetti	Dina De Santis; Paolo Sardisco; Elio Steiner	Musical drama	
Nathalie, Secret Agent	Henri Decoin	Martine Carol, Félix Marten, Darío Moreno	Comedy	Co-production with France
Natura e chimica	Ermanno Olmi	–	Short documentary	
Nel blu dipinto di blu	Piero Tellini	Domenico Modugno; Giovanna Ralli; Vittorio De Sica	Comedy	
Nel Segno di Roma (Sheba and the Gladiator)	Guido Brignone; Michelangelo Antonioni	Anita Ekberg; Georges Marchal; Folco Lulli	Historical drama	Co-production with France, West Germany & Yugoslavia
Nella città l'inferno	Renato Castellani	Anna Magnani; Giulietta Masina	Prison film	
Neurose (Labyrinth)	Rolf Thiele	Nadja Tiller; Peter van Eyck; Amedeo Nazzari	Drama	Co-production with West Germany
Non perdiamo la testa	Mario Mattoli	Ugo Tognazzi; Franca Valeri	Comedy	
Pane e zolfo	Gillo Pontecorvo	–	Documentary	
Passo falso	Vittorio Cottafavi	Giuseppe Pagliarini; Carlo Alighiero; Giuseppe Caldani	TV movie	
Perfide ma belle	Giorgio Simonelli	Claudio Villa; Susana Canales; Tecla Scarano	Musical comedy	
Pierino Salvadanaio	Filippo Paolone	–	Documentary	
Policarpo, ufficiale di scrittura	Mario Soldati	Renato Rascel; Renato Salvatori; Carla Gravina	Comedy	Entered into the 1959 Cannes Film Festival
Poveri milionari	Dino Risi	Maurizio Arena; Renato Salvatori; Alessandra Panaro	Comedy	
Prepotenti più di prima	Mario Mattoli	Aldo Fabrizi; Nino Taranto; Ave Ninchi	Comedy	
Primavera a Mornese	Achille Rizzi	–	Documentary	
Processo di famiglia	Vittorio Cottafavi	Gianni Santuccio; Evi Maltagliati; Nando Gazzolo	TV movie	
Quanto sei bella Roma	Marino Girolami	Claudio Villa; Ennio Girolami; Lorella De Luca	Romantic comedy	Co-production with Spain
Quay of Illusions	Émile Couzinet	Gaby Morlay, Louis Seigner, Lise Bourdin	Drama	Co-production with France
Quel tesoro di papà	Marino Girolami	Aurelio Fierro; Ennio Girolami; Yvonne Monlaur	Comedy	
Ragazzi del Juke-Box	Lucio Fulci	Mario Carotenuto; Elke Sommer; Anthony Steffen	Musical comedy	
Roulotte e roulette	Turi Vasile	Abbe Lane; Antonio Cifariello; Irene Aloisi	Comedy	
Scacco matto	Alberto Gagliardelli	Ernesto Calindri; Renato De Carmine; Delia Bartolucci	TV movie	
Scrollina	Eros Macchi	Wandisa Guida; Armando Francioli; Franco Volpi	TV movie	
Selvaggia	Aldo Bassan	Letizia Stephan; Elio Guarino; Stefano Maggini	Drama	
Simpatico mascalzone	Mario Amendola	Maurizio Arena; Carlo Campanini; Cathia Caro	Comedy	
Sogno di una notte di mezza sbornia	Eduardo De Filippo	Eduardo De Filippo; Pupella Maggio; Pietro De Vico	Comedy	
Soledad	Enrico Gras; Mario Craveri	Pilar Cansino; Fernando Fernán Gómez; Germán Cobos	Drama	Spanish co-production
Spavaldi e innamorati	Giuseppe Vari	Terence Hill; Ennio Girolami; Yvonne Monlaur	Drama	
Spera di sole	Vittorio Brignole	Nerina Bianchi; Anna Bolens; Ugo Bologna	TV movie	
Tempi duri per i vampiri (Uncle Was a Vampire)	Stefano Vanzina	Renato Rascel; Sylva Koscina; Christopher Lee	Comedy horror	
Tipi da spiaggia	Mario Mattoli	Ugo Tognazzi; Christiane Martel; Lauretta Masiero	Comedy	
Totò, Eva e il pennello proibito	Stefano Vanzina	Totò; Louis de Funès; Abbe Lane	Comedy	
Tunisi top secret	Bruno Paolinelli	Elsa Martinelli; Giorgia Moll; Raf Mattioli	Adventure; Comedy	Co-production with West Germany
Tutti innamorati	Giuseppe Orlandini; Franco Rossi	Marcello Mastroianni; Jacqueline Sassard; Marisa Merlini	Comedy	
Un ettaro di cielo	Aglauco Casadio	Marcello Mastroianni; Rosanna Schiaffino; Silvio Bagolini	Comedy	
Un giorno come ogni giorno	Dino B. Partesano	–	Documentary	
Un giorno in Europa	Emilio Marsili	–	Documentary	
Un maledetto imbroglio (The Facts of Murder)	Pietro Germi	Pietro Germi; Claudia Cardinale; Franco Fabrizi; Eleonora Rossi Drago; Saro Urzì; Nino Castelnuovo	Crime drama	
Uomini e nobiluomini	Giorgio Bianchi	Vittorio De Sica; Silvia Pinal; Antonio Cifariello	Comedy	
Vacanze d'inverno	Camillo Mastrocinque; Giuliano Carnimeo	Michèle Morgan; Georges Marchal; Vittorio De Sica	Comedy	
Venezia, la luna e tu	Dino Risi	Alberto Sordi; Marisa Allasio	–	
Vento del sud	Enzo Provenzale	Renato Salvatori; Claudia Cardinale; Romolo Valli	Mafia drama	
Via dei Cessati Spiriti	Gian Vittorio Baldi	–	Short documentary	
Vite perdute	Adelchi Bianchi; Roberto Mauri	Virna Lisi; Jacques Sernas; Sandra Milo	Drama	
Witness in the City	Édouard Molinaro	Lino Ventura, Sandra Milo, Franco Fabrizi	Crime	Co-production with France
