= Castellano & Pipolo =

Italian film directors and screenwriters

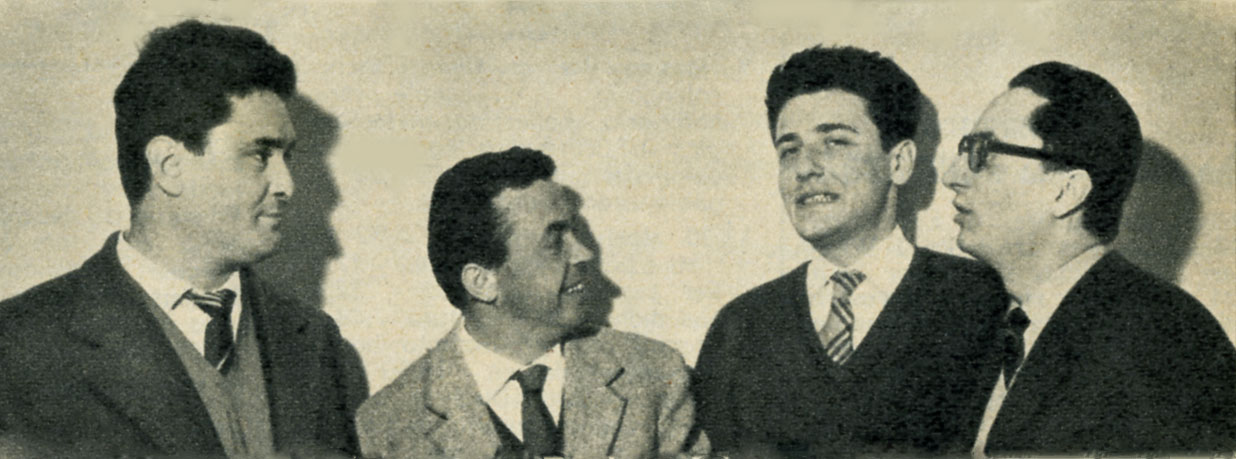
Franco Castellano and Giuseppe "Pipolo" Moccia, first and third from the left respectively

Castellano & Pipolo is the stage name used by the pair of Italian screenwriters and film directors Franco Castellano (1925–1999) and Giuseppe "Pipolo" Moccia (1933–2006). Together, they wrote the screenplays for about seventy films, and directed twenty films, mainly comedies. Their 1984 film Il ragazzo di campagna was shown as part of a retrospective on Italian comedy at the 67th Venice International Film Festival.

On 21 January 2025, the municipality of Rome placed a plaque at the Municipio III park in memory of the duo.

== Selected filmography ==
- My Wife's Enemy (1959)
- Tipi da spiaggia (1959)
- Guardatele ma non toccatele (1959)
- Signori si nasce (1960)
- Toto, Fabrizi and the Young People Today (1960)
- The Fascist (1961)
- 5 marines per 100 ragazze (1962)
- Obiettivo ragazze (1963)
- The Thursday (1963)
- I due pericoli pubblici (1964)
- Slalom (1965)
- The Man, the Woman and the Money (1965)
- I nuovi mostri (1977)
- Mia moglie è una strega (1980)
- Attila flagello di Dio (1982)
- Il ragazzo di campagna (1984)
