= Elsa Vazzoler =

Italian actress

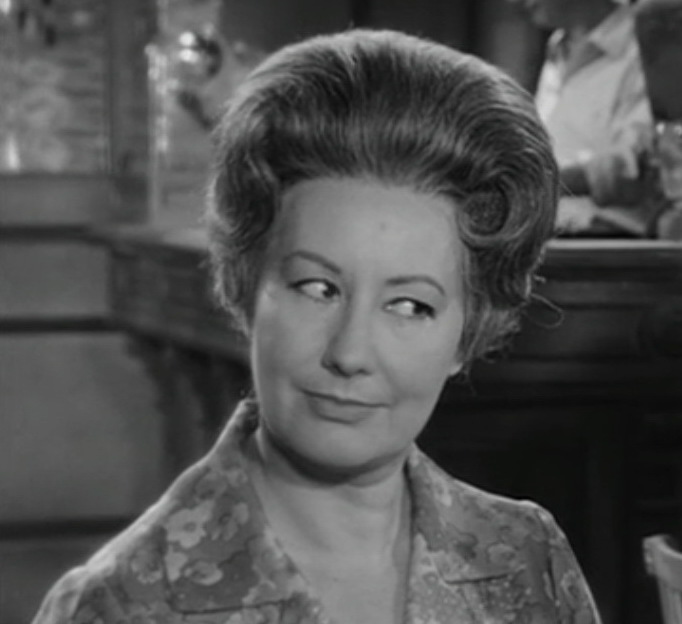
- Vazzoler in Corpse for the Lady (1964)
- Born: 10 May 1920; Treviso, Italy
- Died: 8 August 1989 (aged 69); Rome, Italy
- Occupation: Actress

Elsa Vazzoler (10 May 1920 – 8 August 1989) was an Italian stage, film, television and voice actress.

== Life and career ==
Born in Treviso, Vazzoler started studying acting and ballet after finishing high school. She debuted with dialect amateur dramatics, and in 1945 entered the stage company led by Memo Benassi. Vazzoler got her first leading role in 1949 under the stage direction of Anton Giulio Bragaglia, and later was first actress in the Cesco Baseggio company for several years. She was specialized in the Carlo Goldoni repertoire.

Vazzoler was also active in cinema, in which she was mainly chosen to play character roles in comedies, in radio and on television, which gave her the greatest popularity with the general public thanks to the participation to some successful TV-series.

== Filmography ==
- Ritrovarsi (1947, directed by Oreste Palella) - Laura
- Il richiamo nella tempesta (1950, directed by Oreste Palella)
- Nero and the Burning of Rome (1953, directed by Primo Zeglio)
- Golden Vein (1955, directed by Mauro Bolognini) - Duchessa Giulia Carena
- The Miller's Beautiful Wife(1955, directed by Mario Camerini) - Concettina
- I quattro del getto tonante (1955, directed by Fernando Cerchio) - Donna del Maresciallo
- The Great War(1959, directed by Mario Monicelli) - Moglie di Bordin
- Appuntamento a Ischia (1960, directed by Mario Mattoli) - Anna
- Lettere di una novizia (1960, directed by Alberto Lattuada) - Zaira Michetti
- 5 marines per 100 ragazze (1961, directed by Mario Mattoli) - Una professoressa
- The Fascist (1961, directed by Luciano Salce) - Matilde Bardacci
- I terribili 7 (1963, directed by Raffaello Matarazzo) - Portiera
- Un angelo per Ribot (1963, directed by Carlo Capriata)
- Romeo and Juliet (1964, directed by Riccardo Freda) - Lady Montague
- Corpse for the Lady (1964, directed by Mario Mattoli) - Costanza
- I Kill, You Kill (1965, directed by Gianni Puccini) - Adalgisa (segment "Giochi acerbi")
- Me, Me, Me... and the Others (1966, directed by Alessandro Blasetti) - Old woman eating ice-cream
- Il lungo, il corto, il gatto (1967, directed by Lucio Fulci) - Countess Nora d'Evita
- The Head of the Family (1967, directed by Nanni Loy) - Maria
- Cuore matto... matto da legare (1967, directed by Mario Amendola) - Cesira
- Riderà (Cuore matto) (1967, directed by Bruno Corbucci) - Signora Cesira
- Police Chief Pepe (1969, directed by Ettore Scola) - Vecchia prostituta
- Story of a Woman (1970, directed by Leonardo Bercovici) - Luisa
- Quelli belli... siamo noi (1970, directed by Giorgio Mariuzzo) - Elsa - wife of 'Gino'
- Secret Fantasy (1971, directed by Pasquale Festa Campanile) - Costanza's Mother
- Gli ordini sono ordini (1972, directed by Franco Giraldi)
- Il bacio di una morta (1974, directed by Carlo Infascelli) - Marquise De Kohm
- La presidentessa (1977, directed by Luciano Salce) - Egle Trecanti
- Wifemistress (1977, directed by Marco Vicario) - Teresa, the maid
- How to Lose a Wife and Find a Lover (1978, directed by Pasquale Festa Campanile) - Anita
- Il corpo della ragassa (1979, directed by Pasquale Festa Campanile) - Caterina
- Chaste and Pure (1981, directed by Salvatore Samperi) - Assunta
- I'm Going to Live by Myself (1982, directed by Marco Risi)
- Attila flagello di Dio (1982, directed by Castellano e Pipolo) - Cornaia
- Troppo forte (1986, directed by Carlo Verdone)
- Un uomo di razza (1988, directed by Bruno Rasia)
