= College (TV series) =

- Created by: Federico Moccia, Franco Castellano, Giuseppe Moccia
- Starring: Federica Moro; Keith Van Hoven; Fabrizio Bracconeri; Fabio Ferrari; George Hilton
- Country of origin: Italy
- No. of seasons: 1
- No. of episodes: 14

Production
- Camera setup: Federico Moccia, Lorenzo Castellano
- Running time: 60 min ca. (episode)

Original release
- Network: Italia 1
- Release: March 6 – June 5, 1990

College is a 1990 Italian comedy television series, based on the 1983/4 film College. It aired on Tuesdays at 20.30 in Italy from March 6 to June 5, 1990 for a total of 14 episodes. The episodes were directed by Lorenzo Castellano and Federico Moccia. The music for the series was provided by Claudio Simonetti. The female lead in the series is Federica Moro, Miss Italy, while her male counterpart, and her boyfriend, is Keith Van Hoven.

The college featured in the series is located near the Naval Academy in the heart of Tuscany. The show was produced by Reteitalia and had excellent results in the ratings, with a peak of 6 million viewers per episode. It has since been re-run on numerous satellite channels.

== Cast ==
- Federica Moro: Arianna Silvestri
- Keith Van Hoven: Marco Poggi
- Fabrizio Bracconeri: Carletto Staccioli
- Fabio Ferrari: Capocamerata Emilio Baldani
- George Hilton: Colonnello Armando Madison
- Lara Wendel: Beatrice Barbieri
- Nico Davenia: Pietro Rocco ("Roccia")
- Katalyn Hoffner: Samantha
- Gérard Bonn: Diego Sanchez
- Jessi Calzà: Vally Chiaro
- Daniele Giarratana: Paul Dupont
- Raffaella Monti: Cinzia Bernardini
- Cristina Giani: Samantha
- Ann Margaret Hughes: Prof.ssa Muller
- Roberto Della Casa: Capitano Salice
- Stefano Masciarelli: Marcello il barista
- Anna Teresa Rossini: Dott.ssa Marisa Ricci
- Deborah Cocco: Elena
- Aldina Martano: Silvia
- Renee Rancourt: Manuela (ep. Carletto innamorato)
- Antonio Zequila: Giulio Carta (ep. Il bellimbusto)

== See also ==
- List of Italian television series
