= Segni particolari: bellissimo =

- German theatrical release poster by Renato Casaro
- Directed by: Castellano & Pipolo
- Written by: Castellano & Pipolo
- Produced by: Giovanni Di Clemente
- Starring: Adriano Celentano; Federica Moro
- Cinematography: Danilo Desideri
- Edited by: Antonio Siciliano
- Music by: Gino Santercole
- Distributed by: Cinema International Corporation
- Release date: 1983
- Running time: 90 minutes
- Country: Italy
- Language: Italian

Segni particolari: bellissimo (Distinguishing features: beautiful) is a 1983 Italian comedy film directed by Castellano & Pipolo. The film was a commercial success, grossing over 3,4 billion lire at the Italian box office.

== Plot ==
Mattia is a nice guy, famous writer, who is about to marry Rosalie. Mattia, the day before the wedding, goes to confession to the priest, and reveals that he is in love with another woman, younger, named Michela. Mattia says that the two, before the decision of marriage, lived happy, and when embarrassing situations threatened to discover people the truth about Michela, Mattia used the excuse that she is his daughter. When the wedding are now celebrating, in church bursts Michela, and Mattia escapes away with her.

== Cast ==
- Adriano Celentano: Mattia
- Federica Moro: Michela
- Gianni Bonagura: Professor
- Silvio Spaccesi: Priest
- Tiberio Murgia: Saruzzo
- Anna Kanakis: Rosalia
- Simona Mariani: Lidia
