= Riccardo Rossi (actor, born 1962) =

Italian actor (born 1965)

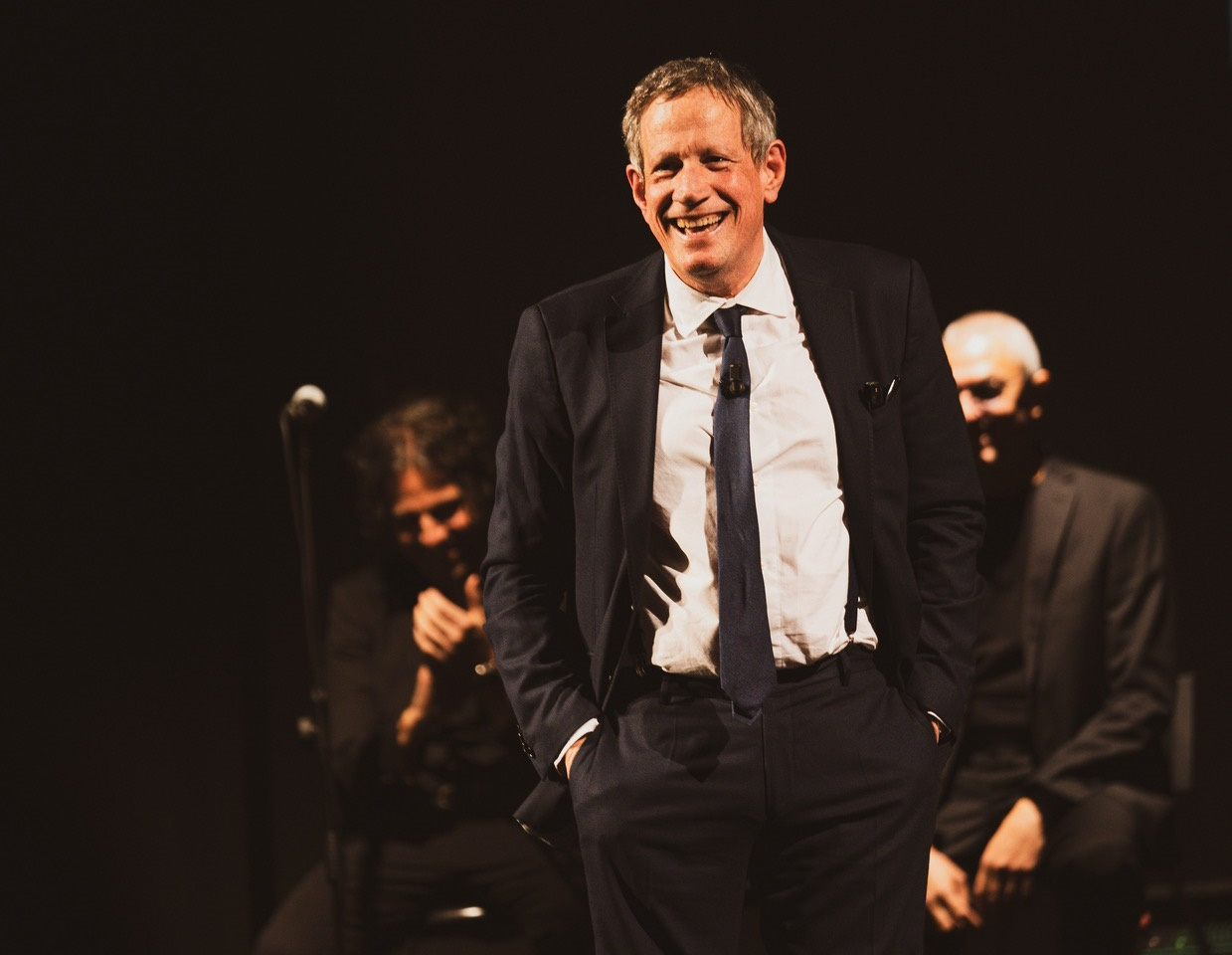
- Rossi in 2024
- Born: 24 October 1962 (age 63); Rome, Italy
- Occupation: Actor

Riccardo Rossi (born 5 September 1962) is an Italian actor, comedian and television presenter, whose career spanned over 40 years.

== Life and career ==
Born in Rome, Rossi began his professional career in 1984, starring in a Fiat commercial directed by Paolo Bianchini. The same year, he made his film debut in Castellano & Pipolo's College. At the end of the decade, he became first known playing Mazzocchi in the Italia 1 comedy series I ragazzi della 3ª C.

In 1992, Rossi worked as a comedian on the television program Non è la Rai, and one year later, he made his debut as television presenter in the Canale 5 children's show A tutto Disney. He then worked in a large number of television programs, notably Forum, Buona domenica, Carràmba che fortuna, Quelli che... il calcio. In 2004, he co-hosted with Paola Cortellesi Nessundorma. Between 2010 and 2017, he was a juror in the La7competitive cooking reality show Cuochi e fiamme, appearing in about 350 episodes.

In 2015, Rossi made his directorial debut with La prima volta (di mia figlia). Starting from 2017, Rossi is the presenter of I miei vinili, later renamed I vinili di..., a talk show first broadcast on Sky and later on RAI.
