= È arrivato mio fratello =

- Theatrical release poster
- Directed by: Franco Castellano; Giuseppe Moccia
- Written by: Franco Castellano; Giuseppe Moccia
- Produced by: Luciano Luna; Achille Manzotti
- Starring: Renato Pozzetto; Massimo Boldi
- Cinematography: Sergio D'Offizi
- Edited by: Antonio Siciliano
- Music by: Detto Mariano
- Release date: December 20, 1985 (Italy)
- Running time: 92 minutes
- Country: Italy
- Language: Italian

È arrivato mio fratello ("Here's My Brother") is a 1985 Italian comedy film directed by Franco Castellano and Giuseppe Moccia.

== Plot ==
The boring and mundane Professor Ovidio has a twin brother called Raf who, on the contrary is an exuberant, womanizing night club pianist. His arrival will bring trouble to Ovidio but in the end his drab life will take a turn for the best.

== Cast ==
- Renato Pozzetto Ovidio Ceciotti/Raffaele Ceciotti
- Carin McDonald as Esmeralda
- Armando Bandini as the principal
- Beatrice Palme as Lidia Cairoli
- Pamela Prati as Mrs. Piranesi
- Richard Harrison as Spinetti
- Enzo Andronico as notary
- Roberto Ceccacci
- Pietro Ghislandi as stand-in of Raf & Ovidio

== See also ==
- List of Italian films of 1985
