= College (1984 film) =

- Directed by: Castellano & Pipolo
- Screenplay by: Franco Castellano; Giuseppe Moccia
- Produced by: Giovanni Di Clemente
- Starring: Christian Vadim; Federica Moro
- Cinematography: Sebastiano Celeste
- Edited by: Antonio Siciliano
- Music by: Claudio Simonetti
- Distributed by: Titanus
- Release date: 1984
- Language: Italian

College is a 1984 Italian comedy film directed by Castellano & Pipolo. It stars Christian Vadim and Federica Moro.

== Cast ==
- Federica Moro as Arianna Mancini
- Christian Vadim as Marco Poggi
- Milla Sannoner as the headmistress
- George Hilton as the Captain
- Fabrizio Baga as Andrea Rispoli
- Francesca Mori as Costanza Forti
- Maurizia De Leone Pandolfelli as Caterina Cataldi
- Nicola Farron as Roberto
- Claudia Dietrich as Livia Grandi
- Michele Mariotti as Derini
- Maria Pia Marsala as Serena De Luca
- Riccardo Rossi as the officer cadet
- Graziella Polesinanti as teacher
- Antonio Barrios as sergeant
