= Armando Bandini =

Italian actor (1926–2011)

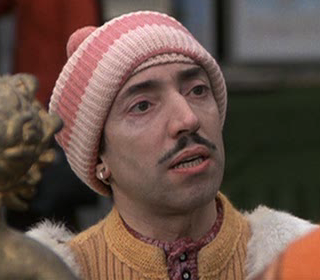
- Bandini in The Sex Machine (1975)
- Born: Armando Burlando; 5 June 1926; Genoa, Italy
- Died: 27 May 2011 (aged 84); Rome, Italy
- Occupations: Actor; voice actor
- Years active: 1955–2011
- Spouses: Emma Fedeli (m. 1950; died 1980): Daniela Igliozzi

Armando Bandini (born Armando Burlando; 5 June 1926 – 27 May 2011) was an Italian actor and voice actor.

== Biography ==
Born in Genoa, Bandini began his career as an actor after the war at the Teatro Sperimentale Luigi Pirandello. In the 1950s he moved to Rome, where he was the protagonist of the revue Il dente senza giudizio and started working in films and on television. Bandini even worked as a voice dubber. He performed the Italian voices of some major Hollywood stars in at least one of two of their films. Among his most prominent dubbing roles, he was the Italian voice of Chi-Fu in the 1998 animated film Mulan.

=== Personal life ===
In the late 1940s, Bandini married stage actress Emma Fedeli and they were together until her death in 1980. He then married actress Daniela Igliozzi.

== Death ==
Bandini died in Rome on 27 May 2011, nine days before his 85th birthday. His wife Daniela Igliozzi survived him.

== Filmography ==
=== Cinema ===
- Tipi da spiaggia (1959) — Prince Joakim's Assistant
- Love and Larceny (1960) — Il ragioniere
- Tu che ne dici? (1960) — Gangster 'Tritolo Joe'
- Bellezze sulla spiaggia (1961) — Ciccio
- Don Camillo: Monsignor (1961) — Don Carlino
- His Women (1961) — Bandini
- The Success (1961) — Romanelli (uncredited)
- La pupa (1963)
- Latin Lovers (1965)
- The Mandrake (1965) — Il servo de Ligurio
- Maigret a Pigalle (1966) — Il portiere del Picrate
- Ace High (1968) — Bank Cashier
- Togli le gambe dal parabrezza (1969)
- The Eroticist (1972) — Bartolino, Maravidi's Secretary
- Giovannona Long-Thigh (1973) — Gay Train Passenger
- The Lady Has Been Raped (1973) — Lama
- The Sex Machine (1975) — Antique Dealer
- Son tornate a fiorire le rose (1975) — Commissario
- Pure as a Lily (1976) — Sandro Scibetta
- Per amore di Cesarina (1976) — L'impiegato del Grand Hotel
- Ride bene... chi ride ultimo (1977) — Armandino (segment "La visita di controllo")
- Ridendo e scherzando (1978) — Il commissario
- Fontamara (1980)
- A Proper Scandal (1984) — Orlando Gastaldelli
- Here's My Brother (1985) — Il preside
- Una casa in bilico (1987) — Tonino, portiere
- A Violent Life (1990) — Treasurer

== Dubbing roles ==
=== Animation ===
- Chi-Fu in Mulan
- Doctor Mouse in The Rescuers Down Under
- Barney Rubble in The New Fred and Barney Show
- Mr. Piccolo in Porco Rosso

=== Live action ===
- Otis in Superman
- Frank McCallister in Home Alone
- Frank McCallister in Home Alone 2: Lost in New York
