= Gentlemen Are Born =

Gentlemen Are Born can refer to:

- Gentlemen Are Born (1934 film), a 1934 American film
- Gentlemen Are Born (1960 film), a 1960 Italian film
