= Geronimo Meynier =

Italian actor (1941–2021)

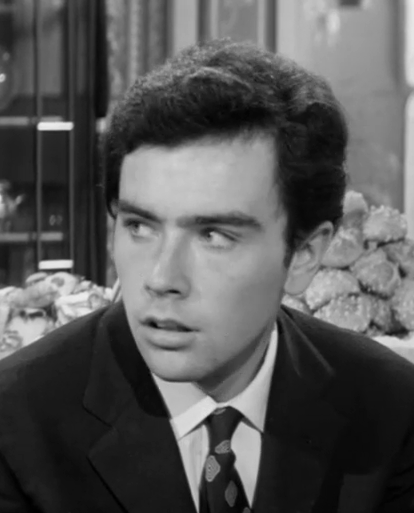
- Meynier in Toto, Fabrizi and the Young People Today (1960)
- Born: July 5, 1941; Fiume, Kingdom of Italy
- Died: January 23, 2021 (aged 79); Milan, Italy
- Years active: 1955–1968
- Children: 3

Geronimo Meynier (5 July 1941 – 23 January 2021) was an Italian film actor who starred in Italian cinema of the 1950s and 1960s. He debuted in Amici per la pelle in 1955 at age 14. His last film was in 1968.

The Italian actor Geronimo Meynier shone in the mid-1950s as a child star, his filmography stopped at eighteen films, but he lives in private for almost half a century. He was born during the Second World War in the port of Fiume, which today bears the name Rijeka and is located in Croatia, but then it belonged to Italy. Geronimo came from a well-to-do family, his grandfather founded a large paper factory in Fiume, his ancestors were from France, which is also indicated by the surname. Rijeka was annexed to Yugoslavia after the war, but the Meynier family fled from communist partisans in 1943 due to their belonging to a higher social class.

Geronimo spent part of his childhood in a boys' boarding school in Austria, in 1954 he returned to his parents in Italy. Shortly thereafter, he auditioned for the upcoming film directed by Franco Rossi, Friends for Life (Amici per la pelle, 1955). He already impressed the jury by the fact that, unlike the other three hundred boys, he came to the audition without his parents. Finally, he was chosen and his father then signed a contract with the film company Cinecittà, which guaranteed Geronimo an income of ten times the average salary at the time. The film Friends for Life, about the friendship of two teenagers from different social strata, attracted the attention of experts in particular, triumphed at the Venice festival and won a trophy at the awards given by the Italian Syndicate of Film Journalists.

Even though the fourteen-year-old Geronimo Meynier became a well-paid celebrity in the mid-1950s, he retained his boyish immediacy, which is evidenced, among other things, by the note mentioned in the biographies about his arrival at the festival in Venice on a second-class train. With his sympathetic face and natural acting, he also appealed to other filmmakers and became the cast representative of teenage boys. He got a minor role in the film Guendalina (1957) directed by Alberto Lattuada, then he got a bigger opportunity in the romantic comedy Love and Chatter (Amore e chiacchiere, 1958) directed by Alessandro Blasetti, in which his father was the famous Vittorio de Sica.

As an eighteen-year-old, Meynier starred in six films in 1959, the most successful domestic title being the World War I comedy The Great War (La grande guerra, 1959), where, however, he flashed only in a minor role as a messenger. On the contrary, he played big roles again in mediocre comedies of that time (First Love - Primo amore, 1959; Winter Holidays - Vacanze d'inverno, 1959). He got even bigger opportunities in extremely successful comedies alongside the famous comedian Totò (Toto, Fabrizi and the Young People Today – Totò, Fabrizi e giovani d'oggi, 1960; Totòtruffa 62, 1962).

Meynier's filmography closes with the title role of Romeo in the adaptation of Shakespeare's classic drama Romeo and Juliet (Romeo e Giulietta, 1964) directed by Riccardo Freda. Although this film went through Italian cinemas without much interest, it was a great success, for example, in Japan, where Geronimo received thousands of letters from female admirers. However, Geronimo Meynier resigned to another film career; the reason was not only the general crisis of Italian cinematography, but also the problematic transformation of child actors into male roles.

Geronimo Meynier lived in Milan since the mid-1960s, where he worked for a long time in the automotive industry (his love for technical fields has accompanied him since childhood). He had three children with his wife Monica.

== Sources ==
- "Geronimo Meynier - Attore". coming soon.it.

== Selected filmography ==
- 1955 : Amici per la pelle
- 1958 : Amore e chiacchiere
- 1959 : La cento chilometri
- 1959 : Vacanze d'inverno
- 1959 : First Love
- 1960 : Toto, Fabrizi and the Young People Today
- 1961 : Totòtruffa 62
- 1962 : Love at Twenty
- 1964 : Romeo and Juliet (1964 film)
- 1968 : Totò Story
