= Move and I'll Shoot =

1958 film

- Directed by: Mario Mattoli
- Written by: Pietro Garinei; Alessandro Giovannini; Mario Mattoli
- Produced by: Giuseppe Amato
- Starring: Renato Rascel
- Cinematography: Aldo Tonti
- Music by: Gorni Kramer
- Release date: 1958
- Running time: 90 minutes
- Country: Italy
- Language: Italian

Move and I'll Shoot (Italian: Come te movi, te fulmino!) is a 1958 Italian comedy film directed by Mario Mattoli and starring Renato Rascel.

== premises ==
Renato Tuzzi is a shy primary school teacher. His students are noisy and do not listen to him.

== Cast ==
- Renato Rascel: Renato Tuzzi
- Giovanna Ralli: Giovanna
- Mario Carotenuto: Annibale
- Xenia Valderi: Sophelin Lolloe
- Franco Andrei: Scardocchia
- Dori Dorika: Augusta
- Cesare Bettarini
