= Miss Europe 1981 =

International beauty pageant

- Date: 9 June 1981
- Venue: The Night Out Theatre Restaurant, Birmingham, England, United Kingdom
- Entrants: 21
- Placements: 11
- Debuts: Gibraltar
- Withdrawals: Malta
- Returns: Cyprus
- Winner: Anne Mette Larsen; Denmark

Miss Europe 1981 was the 41st edition of the Miss Europe pageant and the 30th edition under the Mondial Events Organization. It was held in Birmingham, England, United Kingdom on 9 June 1981. Anne Mette Larsen of Denmark was crowned Miss Europe 1981 by outgoing titleholder Karin Zorn of Austria.

== Results ==
=== Placements ===
Placement	Contestant
Miss Europe 1981	Denmark – Anne Mette Larsen
1st Runner-Up	Holland – Ingrid Johanna Maria Schouten
2nd Runner-Up	Italy – Anna Kanakis
3rd Runner-Up	Sweden – Eva-Lena Lundgren
4th Runner-Up	Finland – Eija Helena Korolainen
Top 11	Austria – Edda Schnell; France – Isabelle Benard; Iceland – Elísabet Traustadóttir; Ireland – Valerie "Vicki" Roe; Spain – María Agustina García; Switzerland – Jolanda Egger

== Contestants ==
- Austria – Edda Schnell
- Belgium – Else Desplenter
- Cyprus – Rolly Stylianidou
- Denmark – Anne Mette Larsen
- England – Joanna Longley
- Finland – Eija Helena Korolainen
- France – Isabelle Benard
- Germany – Edith Maciejek
- Gibraltar – Maria Pilar Wahnon
- Greece – Natassa Zanthopoulou (Natasa Xanthopoulou)
- Holland – Ingrid Johanna Maria Schouten
- Iceland – Elísabet Traustadóttir
- Ireland – Valerie "Vicki" Roe
- Italy – Anna Kanakis
- Norway – Mona Olsen
- Scotland – Anne McFarlane
- Spain – María Agustina García Alcaide
- Sweden – Eva-Lena Lundgren
- Switzerland – Jolanda Egger
- Turkey – Ayşegül Ercan
- Wales – Karen Ruth Stannard

== Notes ==
=== Debuts ===
- Gibraltar

=== Returns ===
- Cyprus

=== Withdrawals ===
- Malta
