= The Mandrake (1965 film) =

1965 film by Alberto Lattuada

La Mandragola
- Directed by: Alberto Lattuada
- Written by: Alberto Lattuada; Luigi Magni; Stefano Strucchi (from the play written by Niccolò Machiavelli)
- Produced by: Alfredo Bini
- Starring: Rosanna Schiaffino; Philippe Leroy; Jean-Claude Brialy; Totò
- Cinematography: Tonino Delli Colli
- Edited by: Nino Baragli
- Music by: Gino Marinuzzi Jr.
- Production company: Arco Film
- Distributed by: Titanus Distribuzione
- Release date: 1965
- Running time: 103 minutes 97 minutes (Home Video cut)
- Countries: Italy; France
- Language: Italian

The Mandrake (Italian: La Mandragola; also called Mandragola: The Love Root) is a 1965 Franco-Italian co-production directed by Alberto Lattuada and based on the eponymous 16th-century play Niccolò Machiavelli. It was nominated for the Academy Award for Best Costume Design.

== Plot ==
During a long stay in Paris, the young Callimaco learns from his friend Cammillo Calfucci of the beauty of Lucrezia, who has been married for four years with the rich and silly notary Nicia Calfucci, from whom she cannot have children. Returning to Florence, he sees for the first time and falls in love with the woman, who tries to meet and seduce but without success. To help him in the enterprise, in addition to his servant Siro, is Ligurio, who has a great influence on Nicia; Ligurio advises Callimaco to pretend to be a doctor and to convince the notary to let his wife drink an infusion of mandragola, capable of curing her presumed sterility (in fact it is Nicia who is sterile: according to a belief then widespread, a man who was not impotent must necessarily have been able to procreate). However, this magical cure has a contraindication: whoever has the first sexual relationship with the woman will be infected with the poison of the mandragola and will die within eight days. To remedy the problem and at the same time protect Nicia's honor, all you have to do is meet her secretly with the first street "boy" who will absorb all the deadly poison.

Persuaded Nicia, all that remains is to convince Lucrezia, who will never consent given her pious and devoted character. This time also the mother Sostrata and the friar Timothy will intervene, who playing on her Christian devotion - dramaturgically important the biblical quotation of Lot and the daughters - will convince her to "cure". That night Callimaco will disguise himself as a beggar and will be carried by the husband himself into the arms of his wife, who will not be satisfied with this fleeting encounter but will want to reiterate it in the time to come.

== Cast ==
- Rosanna Schiaffino as Lucrezia
- Philippe Leroy as Callimaco
- Jean-Claude Brialy as Ligurio
- Totò as Il Frate Timoteo
- Romolo Valli as Messer Nicia
- Nilla Pizzi as La Madre
- Armando Bandini as Il servo de Ligurio
- Pia Fioretti as La francesina
- Jacques Herlin as Frate Predicatore
- Donato Castellaneta as L'Uomo-Donna
- Ugo Attanasio as Lo Stregone
- Luigi Leoni
- Renato Montalbano
- Mino Bellei as Cliente Osteria
- Walter Pinelli
