= Youth March =

1969 drama film

- Directed by: Franco Rossi
- Screenplay by: Franco Rossi
- Produced by: Elio Scardamaglia; Ugo Guerra
- Starring: Alain Noury
- Cinematography: Vittorio Storaro
- Edited by: Giorgio Serrallonga
- Music by: Piero Piccioni
- Distributed by: Titanus
- Release date: 1969
- Language: Italian

Youth March (Italian: Giovinezza giovinezza) is a 1969 Italian drama film written and directed by Franco Rossi.

== Cast ==
- Alain Noury as Giulio Govoni
- Katia Moguy as Mariuccia Cavallari
- Roberto Lande as Giordano Cavallari
- Olimpia Carlisi as Olimpia
- Leonard Mann as Efrem
- Colomba Ghiglia as Laura
- Antonio Centa as Cavallari, father of Giordano and Mariuccia
- Guido Alberti as Milazzo, lawyer
- Alessandro Haber as Guido Cohen
- Piero Gerlini as Arlotti, barber

== Production ==
The film is loosely based on the novel with the same name by Luigi Preti. It was shot in the fall of 1968 between Ferrara, Cento, Tresigallo, Pomposa di Codigoro, and Albarella.

The film, shot in black and white, marked the official debut as cinematographer of Vittorio Storaro.

== Reception ==
A contemporary Variety review described the film as 'an unpretentious but subtle and conscientious low-budgeter' noting: 'Rossi deliberately envelopes the neo-realistic yarn in intermittent modern styling. Rapid cutting, free camera, overlapping commentary and dialog and flash flashbacks—puzzling in spots—succeed in blending with the slower poetic passages of his Po Valley setting as well as the underpaced scenes of human and social conflict'.

For this film, Vittorio Storaro won a Nastro d'Argento for Best Cinematography.
