= Dori Dorika =

Russian-born Italian actress (1913–1996)

- Born: Dorotea Massa; 1 October 1913; Odesa, Ukraine
- Died: 1 January 1996 (aged 82); Lariano, Rome, Italy
- Occupation: Actress

Dori Dorika (1 October 1913 – 1 January 1996) was a Russian-born Italian actress. She was sometimes credited as Dory Dorika.

== Life and career ==
Born Dorotea Massa in Odesa, Ukraine, the daughter of a Russian mother and a Neapolitan father, she moved in Milan at very young age, and started her career on stage, in operettas and revues. She got a large popularity in the musical comedy theatre, notably thanks to Un paio d’ali, whose film adaptation marked her debut on the big screen. From then she started an intense film career as a character actress, usually cast in humorous roles.

== Filmography ==
| Year | Title | Role | Notes |
|---|---|---|---|
| 1957 | Rascel-Fifì | Donna francese al Rascel la Nuit | |
| 1958 | Angel in a Taxi | La moglie del fornaio | |
| 1958 | Move and I'll Shoot | Augusta | |
| 1959 | Men and Noblemen | Olga | Uncredited |
| 1959 | Juke box urli d'amore | Franchina | |
| 1960 | The Dam on the Yellow River | Mamie | |
| 1960 | Gentlemen Are Born | Adelina Maniglia | |
| 1960 | My Friend, Dr. Jekyll | Yvonne Trelati Norcia | |
| 1960 | Fountain of Trevi | La sora Nannina | |
| 1960 | The Passionate Thief | Milena | |
| 1960 | Anônimas Cocottes | | |
| 1960 | Ferragosto in bikini | La moglie del bagnante paesano | |
| 1961 | Bellezze sulla spiaggia | Mimma De Matteis | |
| 1961 | Scandali al mare | Eleonora De Lollis | |
| 1962 | Toto's First Night | | Uncredited |
| 1962 | Il medico delle donne | The bespectacled Woman with a Fur Hat | |
| 1963 | I soliti rapinatori a Milano | Maria Tibiletti | |
| 1963 | La donna degli altri è sempre più bella | Invitata | Uncredited |
| 1965 | Non son degno di te | Mrs. Scannapieco | |
| 1972 | White Sister | Dorotea, the cook | |
| 1973 | The Sensual Man | Sister of Paolo | |
| 1975 | Dracula in the Provinces | Night club singer | Uncredited |
| 1976 | Nick the Sting | Minor Role | Uncredited, (final film role) |
