= Anna Kanakis =

Italian actress and model (1962–2023)

- Kanakis in 'O Re (1989)
- Born: Anna Maria Kanakis; 1 February 1962; Messina, Italy
- Died: 19 November 2023 (aged 61); Rome, Italy
- Height: 173 cm (68 in)
- Spouse(s): Claudio Simonetti (1981–?); Marco Merati Foscarini (2004–2023)
- Beauty pageant titleholder
- Title: Miss Italia 1977
- Major competitions: Miss Italia 1977 (Winner); Miss World 1977; Miss Universe 1981; Miss Europe 1981 (2nd Runner-Up)

Anna Kanakis (Greek: Άννα Κανάκη; 1 February 1962 – 19 November 2023) was an Italian actress, novelist, model and beauty pageant titleholder.

== Life and career ==
Born in Messina from a Greek father from Crete and a Sicilian mother, in 1977 Kanakis was Miss Italy at 15 years old, being the younger winner at the time. In 1981, she entered the Miss Universe competition. Kanakis worked in cinema as early as 1980, being mainly active in comedy films. In later years, her career transitioned to television, where she had leading roles in series and TV-movies.

Starting from You're So Mine When You Sleep, a 2010 novel about George Sand's life, Kanakis specialized in historical novels. Her last work was Don't judge me ("Non giudicarmi"), a novel about the life events of Jacques d'Adelswärd-Fersen.

Kanakis also had a brief political experience as national leader of Culture and Entertainment in the Democratic Union for the Republic.

== Personal life and death ==
In 1981, Kanakis married the composer Claudio Simonetti, but their marriage only lasted a few years. From 2004, she was married to Marco Merati Foscarini, a descendant of Marco Foscarini, one of the last Doges of Venice. Kanakis had no children. She died of lymphoma on 19 November 2023, aged 61.

== Selected filmography ==
=== Film ===
Year	Title	Role	Notes
1981	Attila flagello di Dio	Sirena	
1983	Acapulco, prima spiaggia... a sinistra	Marina	
1983	Occhio, malocchio, prezzemolo e finocchio	Customer	
1983	The New Barbarians	Alma	Italian film; released in the U.S. as Warriors of the Wasteland
1983	2019, After the Fall of New York	Eurac Officer Ania	Italian film; original title 2019 - Dopo la caduta di New York
1983	Segni particolari: bellissimo	Rosalia	Credited as Anna Maria Kanakis
1989	'O Re	The Brigand	
1990	The Miser	Elisa	
1991	Money	Anna Lupino	
1991	Reflections in a Dark Sky	Chim	
1997	Gli inaffidabili	Gena	
2006	The Final Inquiry	Claudia Procula	Italian film; original title L'inchiesta

=== Television ===
Year	Title	Role	Notes
1990	A Season of Giants	Sister Ilaria	TV movie
1991	Young Catherine	Countess Vorontsova	TV mini-series
1995	La famiglia Ricordi	Maria	TV mini-series; 4 episodes
1999	Turn of the Century	Giulia Cairo	TV mini-series; original title Fine secolo; 5 episodes
