= Three Nights of Love (1964 film) =

1964 film

- Film poster
- Directed by: Renato Castellani; Luigi Comencini; Franco Rossi
- Written by: Franco Castellano; Marcello Fondato; Massimo Franciosa
- Produced by: Silvio Clementelli
- Starring: Catherine Spaak; Enrico Maria Salerno; Adolfo Celi
- Cinematography: Roberto Gerardi; Mario Montuori
- Edited by: Jolanda Benvenuti; Renato Cinquini; Giorgio Serrallonga
- Music by: Giovanni Fusco; Piero Piccioni; Carlo Rustichelli
- Release date: 1964
- Running time: 100 minutes
- Country: Italy
- Language: Italian

Three Nights of Love (Italian: Tre notti d'amore) is a 1964 omnibus comedy film in three segments directed by Renato Castellani, Luigi Comencini and Franco Rossi and starring Catherine Spaak, Enrico Maria Salerno and Adolfo Celi.

== Cast ==
- Adolfo Celi (segment "La moglie bambina")
- Anna Maria Checchi
- Diletta D'Andrea as Gabriella (segment "La moglie bambina")
- Rina Franchetti
- John Phillip Law as Fra Felice (segment "Fatebenefratelli")
- Tiberio Murgia
- Dante Posani
- Aldo Puglisi (segment "La vedova")
- Enrico Maria Salerno as Giuliano (segment "La moglie bambina")
- Renato Salvatori as Nicola (segment "La vedova")
- Joe Sentieri
- Catherine Spaak as Ghiga (segment "Fatebenefratelli"), Giselle (segment "La vedova"), Cirilla (segment "La moglie bambina")
- Toni Ucci
