= Sharon Gusberti =

Italian film actress and fashion model (born 1964)

- Born: 6 August 1964 (age 61); Milan, Italy
- Occupation: Actress
- Children: Valentina and Martina

Sharon Gilberto (born August 6, 1964) is an Italian film actress and former fashion model.

== Career ==
Following her debut in the film Yuppies by Carlo Vanzina in 1986, she also starred in Via Montenapoleone, the same year.

In the following year, she was cast as Sharon Zampetti in the television series I Ragazzi Della 3ª C. She portrayed the snobbish daughter of industrialist Camillo Zampetti (played by Guido Nicheli). She took a hiatus from acting following the third and final season of the show.

== Personal life ==
She is married to a Milanese nobleman and as of 2021, has no apparent plans to return to her former career path. She has two daughters; Valentina and Martina.

Her family resides with her in Milan.

== Filmography ==
=== Film ===
Year	Title	Role	Notes	Ref
1986	Yuppies - I giovani di successo	Amanda		
1987	Via Montenapoleone	Raffaella		

=== Television ===
Year	Title	Role	Notes
1987–1989	I ragazzi della 3ª C	Sharon Zampetti	31 episodes
