= Pietro Sarubbi =

Italian actor and writer

- Born: Pietro Sarubbi; June 22, 1961 (age 65); Milan, Italy
- Occupations: Actor and writer
- Years active: 1985–present

Pietro Sarubbi (born 22 June 1961) is an Italian actor and writer.

== Biography ==
Sarubbi was born in Milan and attended a directing course at the Civica Scuola d'Arte Drammatica del Piccolo Teatro in his hometown. He began his artistic career in 1979 by working in the theater. In 1980, he started working in programs at RAI.

Born artistically as a circus and theater actor, Sarubbi then worked for cinema and television. In 1985 he made his debut both at the cinema in the film Yuppies 2 and on television in the series Io e Il Duce. Subsequently, he acted under the direction of great Italian directors: Gabriele Salvatores and Nanni Loy. From 1985 to 2021, Sarubbi took part in numerous television series and films.

He became known to the public thanks to the roles played in foreign productions such as Captain Corelli's Mandolin directed by John Madden and as Barabbas in The Passion of the Christ directed by Mel Gibson.

Inspired while filming Passion, Sarubbi converted to Roman Catholicism. He wrote of this experience in his book From Barabbas to Jesus: Converted with a Look.

== Filmography ==
=== Cinema ===
- Yuppies 2, directed by Enrico Oldoini (1985)
- Kamikazen: Last Night in Milan, directed by Gabriele Salvatores (1988)
- Scugnizzi, directed by Nanni Loy (1989)
- Music for Old Animals, directed by Stefano Benni and Umberto Angelucci (1989)
- Panama Sugar, directed by Marcello Avallone (1990)
- Piedipiatti, directed by Carlo Vanzina (1991)
- Papa Says Mass, directed by Renato Pozzetto (1996)
- Ardena, directed by Luca Barbareschi (1997)
- The Italian Shorts (1997)
- My Dearest Friends, directed by Alessandro Benvenuti (1998)
- Captain Corelli's Mandolin, directed by John Madden (2001)
- Three Wives, directed by Marco Risi (2001)
- The Passion of the Christ, directed by Mel Gibson (2004)
- Escape from the Call Center, directed by Federico Rizzo (2008)
- Little A, directed by Salvatore D'Alia and Giuliano Ricci (2009)
- The Canticle of Maddalena, directed by Mauro Campiotti (2011)
- Welcome Mr. President, directed by Riccardo Milani (2013)
- People Who Are Well, directed by Francesco Patierno (2014)
- The Rich, the Pauper and the Butler, directed by Aldo, Giovanni & Giacomo and Morgan Bertacca (2014)
- Sea View, directed by Andrea Castoldi (2017)
- Agadah, directed by Alberto Rondalli (2017)
- The Longest Night of the Year, directed by Simone Aleandri (2021)

=== Television ===
- Mussolini and I – TV miniseries (1985)
- Atelier – TV miniseries (1985)
- Der lange Sommer – TV movie (1989)
- Voyage of Terror: The Achille Lauro Affair – Journey into Terror – TV movie (1990)
- Eurocops – TV series (1992)
- Running for Life – TV miniseries (1992)
- Il maresciallo Rocca – TV series (1996)
- The Lawyer – TV series (1996)
- Casa Vianello – TV series (1991–2003)
- John Paul II – TV miniseries (1996)
- Camera Café – TV series (1996)
- Watch Out for Those Two – TV movie (2009)
- Nebbie e delitti – TV series (2009)
- Piloti – TV series (2009)
- Imma Tataranni: Deputy Prosecutor – TV series, episode 1x02 (2019)

=== Short films ===
- The Overseer, directed by Francesca Frangipane (1993)
- The Perfectionist, directed by Claudio Malaponti (1996)
- The Vanishing Killer, directed by Paolo Doppieri (1999)
- Selection, directed by Simone Andrizzi (2008)
- Last Supper, directed by Leo Fiorica (2011)
- Little Talks, directed by Yassen Genadiev (2014)
