= Yuppies (film) =

1986 Italian film by Carlo Vanzina

- Italian: Yuppies – I giovani di successo
- Directed by: Carlo Vanzina
- Written by: Carlo Vanzina; Enrico Vanzina
- Produced by: Luigi De Laurentiis; Aurelio De Laurentiis
- Starring: Massimo Boldi; Jerry Calà; Christian De Sica; Ezio Greggio; Federica Moro; Corinne Cléry; Guido Nicheli; Valeria D'Obici
- Cinematography: Luigi Kuveiller
- Edited by: Raimondo Crociani
- Music by: Detto Mariano
- Release date: 20 March 1986
- Running time: 93 minutes
- Country: Italy
- Language: Italian

Yuppies (Italian: Yuppies – I giovani di successo) is a 1986 Italian comedy film directed by Carlo Vanzina.

A sequel entitled Yuppies 2, directed by Enrico Oldoini, was released later in the same year.

== Cast ==
- Jerry Calà as Giacomo
- Christian De Sica as Sandro
- Massimo Boldi as Lorenzo
- Ezio Greggio as Willy
- Corinne Cléry as Françoise
- Federica Moro as Margherita
- Guido Nicheli as director of Giacomo
- Ugo Bologna as Lorenzo's father in law
- Valeria D'Obici as Virginia
- Sharon Gusberti as Amanda
- Isaac George as waiter of Lorenzo
- Jinny Steffan as Gioietta
- Sergio Vastano as Police commissioner
- Renzo Marignano as Françoise's husband
