= Monte Napoleone =

1986 film

- Italian: Via Montenapoleone
- Directed by: Carlo Vanzina
- Written by: Jaja Fiastri; Carlo Vanzina
- Produced by: Dino De Laurentiis
- Starring: Renée Simonsen; Carol Alt; Luca Barbareschi; Paolo Rossi; Sharon Gusberti; Corinne Cléry; Fabrizio Bentivoglio; Johan Bramberg
- Cinematography: Fabrizio Bentivoglio
- Edited by: Ruggero Mastroianni
- Music by: Beppe Cantarelli
- Release date: 1986
- Running time: 104 minutes (version for the cinema)
- Country: Italy
- Language: Italian

Monte Napoleone (Italian: Via Montenapoleone) is a 1986 Italian comedy film directed by Carlo Vanzina.

== Cast ==
- Carol Alt as Margherita
- Luca Barbareschi as Guido
- Corinne Cléry as Chiara
- Renée Simonsen as Elena
- Renato Scarpa as Francesca's Husband
- Paolo Rossi as Luca
- Gianfranco Manfredi
- Lorenzo Lena as Francesca's Daughter
- Sharon Gusberti as Raffaella
- Daniel Gélin as Padre di Elena
- Valentina Cortese as Madre di Guido
- Johan Bramberg as Tom
- Marisa Berenson as Francesca
- Fabrizio Bentivoglio as Roberto
- Carmen Loderus as Young Model

== The "long version" for television ==
An alternative cut of the film was made for television. It runs three hours and was aired in two episodes.
