= Pure as a Lily =

1976 film

- Film poster
- Directed by: Franco Rossi
- Written by: Vittorio Bonicelli; Roberto Leoni; Franco Lerici; Ugo Tucci
- Produced by: Franco Cuccu; Bernard J. Kingham; Basil Rayburn
- Starring: Vittorio Gassman
- Cinematography: Silvano Ippoliti
- Edited by: Frederick Wilson
- Music by: John Cameron
- Distributed by: Variety Distribution
- Release date: 1976
- Running time: 100 minutes
- Country: Italy
- Language: Italian

Pure as a Lily (Italian: Come una rosa al naso) is a 1976 Italian comedy film directed by Franco Rossi and starring Vittorio Gassman.

== Cast ==
- Vittorio Gassman - Anthony M. Wilson
- Ornella Muti - Lucia Mantuso
- Madeleine Hinde - Vanessa Hampton
- Adolfo Celi - L'onorevole
- Alessandro Haber - Vittorio
- Armando Bandini - Sandro Scibetta
- Antonino Faa Di Bruno - Don Gerlando
- Graham Stark - Detective Mike
- Dudley Sutton - Jack
- Lou Castel - Luciano
- John Bryant - Basil
- Stan Jay - Anthony's Father
- Malya Woolf - Polimena
- Michael Da Costa - Giulio
- Guido Adorni - Waiter
- Tony Osoba - Othello
