= Edy Vessel =

Italian actress and businesswoman

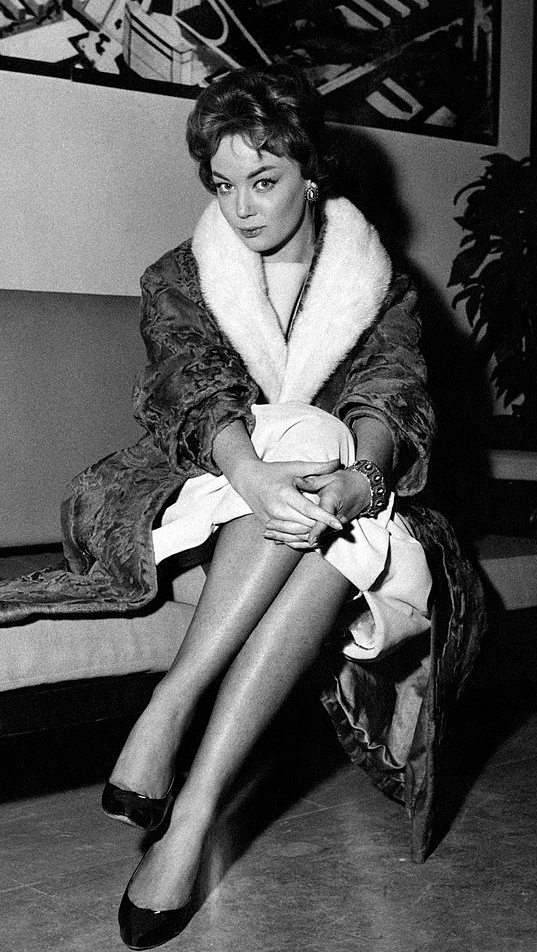
- Edy Vessel in 1959
- Born: Edoarda Vesselovsky; 8 March 1940 (age 86); Trieste, Italy
- Occupation: Actress
- Years active: 1959-1963
- Spouses: Camillo Crociani (m. 1970; died 1980): Count Pierluigi Vitalini
- Children: Princess Camilla Crociani, Duchess of Castro; Cristiana Delrieu
- Website: www.edyvesel.it/it/

Edoarda Vesselovsky (born 8 March 1940), better known by her stage name Edy Vessel, Edi Vessel, or Edy Vesel, is an Italian actress and businesswoman.

== Biography ==
Vesselovsky was born in Trieste in 1940. In her youth, she worked as a model in the local boutiques while attending school. She landed a part as a chorus girl in a Wanda Osiris revue, where she was discovered by Mario Mattoli, who cast her in her debut film role in the 1959 film Guardatele ma non toccatele [Look, But Don't Touch Them].

This was followed by a dozen films, culminating with a role in Fellini's 8½. After this film, Vessel abandoned her film career.

== Personal life ==
In 1965 Vessel started a relationship with Italian businessman Camillo Crociani; once he obtained the annulment of his first marriage from the Roman Rota, the couple married in 1970; they had two daughters. Heavily implicated in a bribery scandal involving Lockheed Corporation's alleged bribery of government officials to induce the purchase of Lockheed planes, Crociani moved the whole family to Mexico. Upon Crociani's death in 1980, Vessel remarried to Count Pierluigi Vitalini and assumed control of Crociani's company Ciset (later to become Vitrociset), resulting in a court battle with Crociani's children from his first marriage.

Vessel purchased Les canots amarrés by Vincent van Gogh at Sotheby's from Scottish collector Royan Middleton in 1991.

== Filmography ==
- Guardatele ma non toccatele (Mario Mattoli, 1959) - Maggie
- Il raccomandato di ferro (Marcello Baldi, 1959)
- Tipi da spiaggia (Mario Mattoli, 1959) - Lucy
- Un dollaro di fifa (Giorgio Simonelli, 1960)
- The Passionate Thief (Mario Monicelli, 1960) - La ragazza
- The Thief of Baghdad (Arthur Lubin and Bruno Vailati, 1961) - Kadeejah
- Sword of the Conqueror (Carlo Campogalliani, 1961) - Matilda
- The Trojan Horse (Giorgio Ferroni, 1961) - Helen
- Psycosissimo (Steno, 1962) - Annalisa Michelotti
- Seven Seas to Calais (Primo Zeglio, 1962) - Arabella Ducleau
- 8½ (Federico Fellini, 1963) - L'indossatrice
- Rocambole (Bernard Borderie, 1963) - Cléo Santelli (singer) (final film role)
