= The Passionate Thief =

1960 film

- Film poster
- Directed by: Mario Monicelli
- Screenplay by: Suso Cecchi d'Amico; Age & Scarpelli; Mario Monicelli
- Story by: Suso Cecchi d'Amico; Age & Scarpelli; Mario Monicelli
- Based on: Alberto Moravia (stories)
- Produced by: Silvio Clementelli
- Starring: Anna Magnani; Totò; Ben Gazzara; Fred Clark; Edy Vessel
- Cinematography: Leonida Barboni
- Edited by: Adriana Novelli
- Music by: Lelio Luttazzi
- Color process: Black and white
- Production company: Titanus
- Distributed by: Titanus
- Release date: 13 October 1960
- Running time: 106 minutes
- Country: Italy
- Language: Italian

The Passionate Thief (Italian: Risate di gioia) is a 1960 Italian comedy film directed by Mario Monicelli and starring Anna Magnani and Totò and Ben Gazzara.

== Plot ==
Two friends (Toto and Magnani) live by their wits working as comedians and cabaret at Cinecittà, before being invited to friends' parties or masked balls during New Year's Eve in Rome. The two, however, even though they make people laugh all the time in public, live an inner conflict, namely that the two have always to be aware to give a smile to someone, but they can never be rich and happy because they are street artists and with a precarious wage.

== Cast ==
- Anna Magnani as Gioia "Tortorella' Fabbricotti
- Totò as Umberto 'Infortunio' Pennazzuto
- Ben Gazzara as Lello
- Fred Clark as L'americano
- Edy Vessel as La ragazza
- Gina Rovere as Mimi
- Toni Ucci as L'amico de Milena
- Kurt Polter as Himself
- Mac Ronay as Il guidatore della metropolitana
- Alberto De Amicis as Himself
- Gianni Bonagura as Himself
- Rik Van Nutter as Himself (as Rik Von Nutter)
- Dori Dorika as Milena (as Dory Dorika)
- Peppino De Martino as Himself
- Marcella Rovena as Himself
- Carlo Pisacane as Il nonno di Gioia

== Reception ==
On review aggregator website Rotten Tomatoes, the film holds an approval rating of 100% based on 5 reviews.

== See also ==
- List of films set around New Year
