= The Gamble (1988 film) =

- Directed by: Carlo Vanzina
- Starring: Matthew Modine; Faye Dunaway
- Cinematography: Luigi Kuveiller
- Edited by: Ruggero Mastroianni
- Music by: Pino Donaggio
- Production companies: Cecchi Gori Group; Tiger Cinematografica
- Distributed by: Prism Entertainment
- Release date: 1988
- Running time: 104 minutes
- Country: Italy
- Languages: Italian; English

The Gamble (originally titled: La partita) is a 1988 Italian comedy film directed by Carlo Vanzina. It was shot in Rome and Venice. The film is based on the novel with the same name written by Alberto Ongaro. It was generally panned by critics.

== Cast ==
- Matthew Modine as Francesco Sacredo
- Faye Dunaway as Countess Matilda Von Wallenstein
- Jennifer Beals as Lady Olivia Candioni
- Ian Bannen as Francesco's father
- Corinne Cléry as Jacqueline
- Federica Moro as Lucrezia
- Ana Obregón as the actress
- Feodor Chaliapin, Jr. as Federico
- Jacques Herlin as Old fiancé of Olivia
- Karina Huff as Blond Maid
- Gianfranco Barra as Manolo
- Vernon Wells as First Brother Podestà
