= Friends for Life (film) =

1955 film by Franco Rossi

- Theatrical release poster
- Directed by: Franco Rossi
- Written by: Ottavio Alessi; Leonardo Benvenuti; Piero De Bernardi; Ugo Guerra; Franco Rossi
- Produced by: Carlo Civallero
- Starring: Geronimo Meynier; Andrea Scirè; Vera Carmi; Luigi Tosi; Carlo Tamberlani
- Cinematography: Gábor Pogány
- Edited by: Otello Colangeli
- Music by: Nino Rota
- Production companies: Cines; S.N. Pathé Cinéma
- Distributed by: Diana Cinematografica
- Release dates: 3 September 1955 (Venice); 16 September 1955 (Italy)
- Running time: 94 minutes
- Countries: Italy; France
- Language: Italian

Friends for Life (Italian: Amici per la pelle; released in France as Amis pour la vie) is a 1955 Italian–French comedy-drama film directed by Franco Rossi and starring Geronimo Meynier and Andrea Scirè. It was produced by Cines and S.N. Pathé Cinéma and distributed in Italy by Diana Cinematografica.

The film was presented at the 16th Venice International Film Festival, where it received the award of the International Catholic Office for Cinema. It was nominated for Film from Any Source at the 10th British Academy Film Awards, while Cines received the 1956 Nastro d'Argento for producing the year's best film.

== Plot ==
In Rome, Mario Camurati is a confident 14-year-old schoolboy whose father owns a ceramics business. When Franco Petrocinetti joins Mario's class, the teacher assigns him a seat beside Mario. Mario initially resents the newcomer, but Franco quickly earns the approval of their classmates and teachers through his intelligence and reserved manner.

Despite their differences, Mario and Franco become close friends. Unlike Mario, who lives with his parents in a stable household, Franco is the son of a diplomat and lives in a hotel while accompanying his father. Franco tells Mario that he is in love with a black-haired girl who lives in a villa on the Appian Way, although he never sees her leave the house.

Intrigued, Mario skips school and visits the villa. He discovers that it is Franco's former home and that the mysterious girl does not exist. Franco has instead invented the story as a way of preserving his memories of his mother, who died there. Franco is angered by Mario's intrusion, but the two later return to the abandoned house together, where Franco confronts his grief. Mario's parents subsequently offer to allow Franco to live with their family.

The boys later compete against each other in the final of a national cross-country championship. Franco wins the race, leaving Mario humiliated and jealous. In retaliation, Mario tells their classmates about Franco's mother, breaking his promise to keep the matter private.

Hurt by the betrayal, Franco decides to leave Rome with his father. Mario regrets what he has done and rushes to the airport to apologize. He reaches Franco before his departure, and the boys reconcile before sharing a final farewell.

== Cast ==
The cast was listed as follows:

- Geronimo Meynier as Mario Camurati
- Andrea Scirè as Franco Petrocinetti
- Vera Carmi as Mario's mother
- Luigi Tosi as Mario's father
- Carlo Tamberlani as Consul Petrocinetti, Franco's father
- Paolo Ferrara as Professor Martinelli
- Marcella Rovena as the English teacher
- Leonilde Montesi as the Latin teacher
- Ignazio Leone as the gymnastics teacher
- Maria Chiara Bettinali as Margherita
- Isabella Nobili as a student
- Renata Bousquet as a student
- Roberto Illuminati as a student
- Emilio Telve as a student
- Giancarlo Tiburzi as a student
- Vittorio Casale as a student
- Giancarlo Margheriti as a student
- Cesare Ciucchi as a student
- Angelo Bizzone as a student

== Production ==
Rossi developed the film after reading Alain-Fournier's 1913 novel Le Grand Meaulnes and the author's correspondence with Jacques Rivière. Film scholar Franco Perrelli describes Friends for Life as a free variation on the novel rather than a direct adaptation. The film retains the novel's themes of idealized adolescent friendship, emotional discovery and betrayal while transferring the story to contemporary Rome.

The film was produced by Cines, then a state-controlled company headed by Carlo Civallero, in association with the French company S.N. Pathé Cinéma. It was conceived as a film for young audiences, although Rossi intended its treatment of friendship and adolescence to appeal to adults as well. The filmmakers also studied the interests and experiences of schoolchildren while developing the story.

Rossi prepared two endings. In the version shown at the Venice Film Festival, Mario reaches the airport after Franco's plane has departed. The version released commercially allows the boys to meet and reconcile before Franco leaves.

== Release ==
Friends for Life was shown at the Venice Film Festival on 3 September 1955 and was released theatrically in Italy on 16 September. It was released in France in October 1956 under the title Amis pour la vie.

The film received the award of the International Catholic Office for Cinema at Venice. The award organization praised films that it considered to have artistic merit and human or spiritual value.

== Reception ==
The film received a favorable response from the audience at its Venice screening, although Italian critics were divided. Some reviewers objected to the film's movement from a school comedy into melodrama, while others praised Rossi's treatment of the boys' friendship and the performances of its young actors. French critical reception following the film's 1956 release was generally more favorable.

In Rossi's 2000 obituary, The Guardian identified Friends for Life as one of the director's best-remembered films. The newspaper described it as a moving treatment of loyalty between young friends and compared its atmosphere to the films of Vittorio De Sica.
