= Joan Lui =

1985 film by Adriano Celentano

- Italian theatrical release poster by Renato Casaro
- Directed by: Adriano Celentano
- Written by: Adriano Celentano
- Produced by: Mario & Vittorio Cecchi Gori
- Starring: Adriano Celentano; Claudia Mori; Federica Moro; Gian Fabio Bosco; Mirko Setaro; Haruhiko Yamanouchi; Marthe Keller
- Cinematography: Alfio Contini
- Edited by: Adriano Celentano
- Music by: Adriano Celentano; Pinuccio Pirazzoli; Ronny Jackson; Gino Santercole
- Distributed by: Variety Distribution
- Release date: 1985
- Running time: 163 min 133 min (cut edition); 125 min (Home Video cut)
- Country: Italy
- Language: Italian

Joan Lui (also known as Joan Lui - Ma un giorno nel paese arrivo io di lunedì) is a 1985 Italian musical comedy film by Adriano Celentano. It was the fourth and last film Celentano wrote, starred in and directed. The plot is a modernized take on the story of Jesus of Nazareth, with Celentano portraying Joan Lui, a new incarnation of Jesus, with his adversary Jarak being an incarnation of Satan.

== Plot ==
One day in Italy, as Emanuela Carboni, daughter of a large corporation's CEO, is violently kidnapped, a strange wanderer of mysterious origin naming himself Joan Lui appears to condemn the hypocrisy and atrocities of Western culture. When questioned by the police, he starts delivering his message through song, which quickly affects the assembled crowd. His unusual aura and unorthodox style quickly attracts international attention, and he eventually signs a contract with ambitious talent agent Judy Johnson and goes into the music business, attracting a huge fan following. Only the Soviet Union refuses to cover his exploits.

Joan Lui's presence gradually instigates chaos as people begin to split in their opinions of him, and Tina Foster, editor of a pro-Russian newspaper and an acquaintance of Judy's, begins investigating him to publish bad press about him. While visiting one of his concerts in a disco, a supernatural storm breaks out inside the hall, and many people are injured in the ensuing panic. As Joan Lui continues singing, many of the wounded are wondrously healed. For his cultural influence, the President of Italy prepares a public reward for Joan Lui, but in exchange Joan Lui demands total access to the entirety of Italy's television network. The President grants the request, kicking up a massive wave of protest within the government.

After another concert, Joan Lui is kidnapped by Jarak, a powerful Oriental businessman and one of the people who were healed by Joan Lui during the disco incident. Demanding access to the television network through Joan Lui, Jarak keeps him and his companions in his residence for 40 days, offering him wealth and power; Joan Lui refuses and is released at the end of the deadline, although his absence creates a lot of public controversy, and an argument between her and Joan Lui convinces Judy to sell him off to another studio. After his return, Joan Lui seeks to create a band composed of young and inexperienced musicians to better spread his message. Following that, he announces a televised speech by him, but as soon as the broadcast begins, he abruptly cuts it off, confusing the audience. Foster's attempt to find and exploit a chink in Joan Lui's history reaches a degree of obsession for which she is reprimanded by her colleagues, who all quit on her, and her boss. Unexpectedly, Joan Lui comes to her office and declares that he loves her, though his actual agenda behind this announcements remains unexplained.

An accidental live broadcast by Joan Lui's crew and the "thou shalt not kill" message Joan Lui delivers in that show prompts Emanuela's kidnappers, who had just planned to kill her, to release her instead. At the same time, a secret shipment of dead human foetuses for the cosmetic industry, organized by Jarak, is discovered, leading to another government crisis when it is found that numerous high-level politicians are involved. Jarak calls Joan Lui, warning him to stop influencing the public or else get assassinated during his next broadcast.

Despite this threat, Joan Lui holds his televised speech, criticizing all facets of humanity for their self-inflicted corruption and the decline of human society. In the midst of his recital, he is indeed assassinated, but miraculously rises again. Watching this on live TV, Jarak goes berserk, triggering an apocalypse which destroys the world, including himself. As the world falls apart, Judy tearfully apologizes to Joan Lui for trying to profit from him; Joan Lui commends her for being the first person to actually understand his message and then disappears. Foster, who still keeps trying to finish her negative article about Joan Lui even as her office collapses around her, is killed by falling debris; the film ends with a view of her hand protruding from the rubble clutching a bloodied note reading "Ti amo" ("I love you").

== Cast ==
- Adriano Celentano: Joan Lui
- Claudia Mori: Tina Foster
- Marthe Keller: Judy Johnson
- Federica Moro: Emanuela Carboni
- Edwin Marian: Cap. Arthur
- Gian Fabio Bosco: Winston
- Mirko Setaro: Musico
- Rita Rusic: Temple singer
- Haruhiko Yamanouchi: Jarak
- Piero Nuti: Franky
- Edoardo Romano: Prime Minister
- Sal Borgese: Frank
- Gino Cogliandro: Bartender
- Francesco Salvi: Journalist
- Romano Puppo: Assassin

== Soundtrack ==
1. L'uomo perfetto
2. Sex without Love
3. Il tempio
4. Mistero
5. Lunedì
6. Qualcosa nascerà
7. Splendida e nuda
8. L'ora è guinta
9. La prima stella

== Production ==
The film was the center of a dispute between Mario and Vittorio Cecchi Gori and Celentano as the producers decided, a month after theatrical release, to replace the original cut with another version with a different editing and 30 minutes shorter.

== Reception ==
The film was a box office bomb, grossing 7.3 billion lire at the Italian box office in spite of a budget of about 20 billion lire.

The film also received generally bad reviews. Morando Morandini described it as "an enormous music video based on visual shock, jam-packed with music, with some monumental sets and elaborate editing. A true festival of kitsch also on an ideological level". According to Paolo Mereghetti the film, "a personal reading of Christianity in musicals", "a personal delusion of omnipotence", and "a mock-apocalyptic madness that is just able to list the worst clichés of indifference".
