= Yuppies 2 =

- Directed by: Enrico Oldoini
- Written by: Liliana Betti; Enrico Oldoini
- Produced by: Luigi De Laurentiis; Aurelio De Laurentiis
- Starring: Massimo Boldi; Jerry Calà; Christian De Sica; Ezio Greggio; Athina Cenci; Gioia Scola; Lisa Stothard; Federica Moro
- Cinematography: Sergio D'Offizi
- Edited by: Raimondo Crociani
- Music by: Manuel De Sica
- Production company: Filmauro
- Release date: 23 December 1986
- Running time: 99 minutes
- Country: Italy
- Language: Italian
- Box office: 2.8 million admissions (Italy)

Yuppies 2 is a 1986 Italian comedy film directed by Enrico Oldoini. The film is a sequel to Carlo Vanzina's comedy Yuppies, released earlier in the same year.

== Cast ==
- Massimo Boldi as Lorenzo / Lorenzo's sister
- Jerry Calà as Giacomo
- Christian De Sica as Sandro
- Ezio Greggio as Willy
- Athina Cenci as Countess Isabella Barattini Tenti / Gina Maris
- Federica Moro as Margherita
- Gioia Scola as Anna
- Jinny Steffan as Gioietta
- Lisa Stothard as Irina
- Isaac George as the waiter
- Claudio Boldi as Countess' employee
- Enzo De Toma as the valet
- Pietro Sarubbi as Inseminator
- Emanuele Vezzoli as Countess' bodyguard

== Release and reception ==
Yuppies 2 was released in Italy on December 23, 1986 in Rome. It was the second most popular Italian film in Italy during 1987, behind The Name of the Rose with 2.8 million admissions.

Deborah Young of Variety complimented the films camear work by Sergio D'Offizi but said the score was dull and that it was a "tired comedy", stating that "No matter how flat the joke, "Yuppies 2" uses it twice."
