= Claudio Risi =

Italian film director (1948–2020)

- Born: 12 November 1948; Bern, Switzerland
- Died: 26 April 2020 (aged 71); Rome, Italy
- Occupation: Film director
- Years active: 1984–2016

Claudio Risi (12 November 1948 – 26 April 2020) was an Italian film director. His father Dino and his brother Marco are also film directors.

== Selected filmography ==
Film
| Year | Title | Notes |
|---|---|---|
| 1984 | Windsurf - Il vento nelle mani | trans.: The wind in the hands |
| 2011 | Wedding in Paris | |

TV
| Year | Title | Notes |
|---|---|---|
| 1987–1989 | I ragazzi della 3ª C | |
