= Nel blu, dipinto di blu (film) =

- Directed by: Piero Tellini
- Written by: Ettore Scola; Piero Tellini; Cesare Zavattini
- Starring: Domenico Modugno; Giovanna Ralli; Vittorio De Sica
- Cinematography: Gianni Di Venanzo
- Music by: Mario Nascimbene
- Release date: 1959
- Language: Italian

Nel blu, dipinto di blu (Italian pronunciation: [nel ˈblu diˈpinto di ˈblu]), also known as Nel blu, dipinto di blu – Volare, is a 1959 Italian comedy film written and directed by Piero Tellini and starring Domenico Modugno, Giovanna Ralli and Vittorio De Sica.

== Cast ==
- Domenico Modugno as Turi La Rosa
- Giovanna Ralli as Assuntina
- Vittorio De Sica as Spartaco
- Ida Galli as Donata
- Franco Migliacci as Peppe
- Carlo Taranto as Remo
- Riccardo Garrone as "Tre Stecche"
- Gino Buzzanca as the Sicilian industrialist
- Elisabetta Velinska as the daughter of the industrialist
- José Jaspe as Maresciallo
- Juan Calvo as Sor Ettore
- Loris Bazzocchi as Carlino (credited as Antonio Bazzocchi)
- Gianni Meccia as Carabinieri Brigadier
- Elvira Tonelli as Sora Teresa
- Anna Campori as Donata's mistress
- Ada Colangeli as the owner of the shop

== See also ==
- List of Italian films of 1959
