= Federica Moro =

Italian model and actress (born 1965)

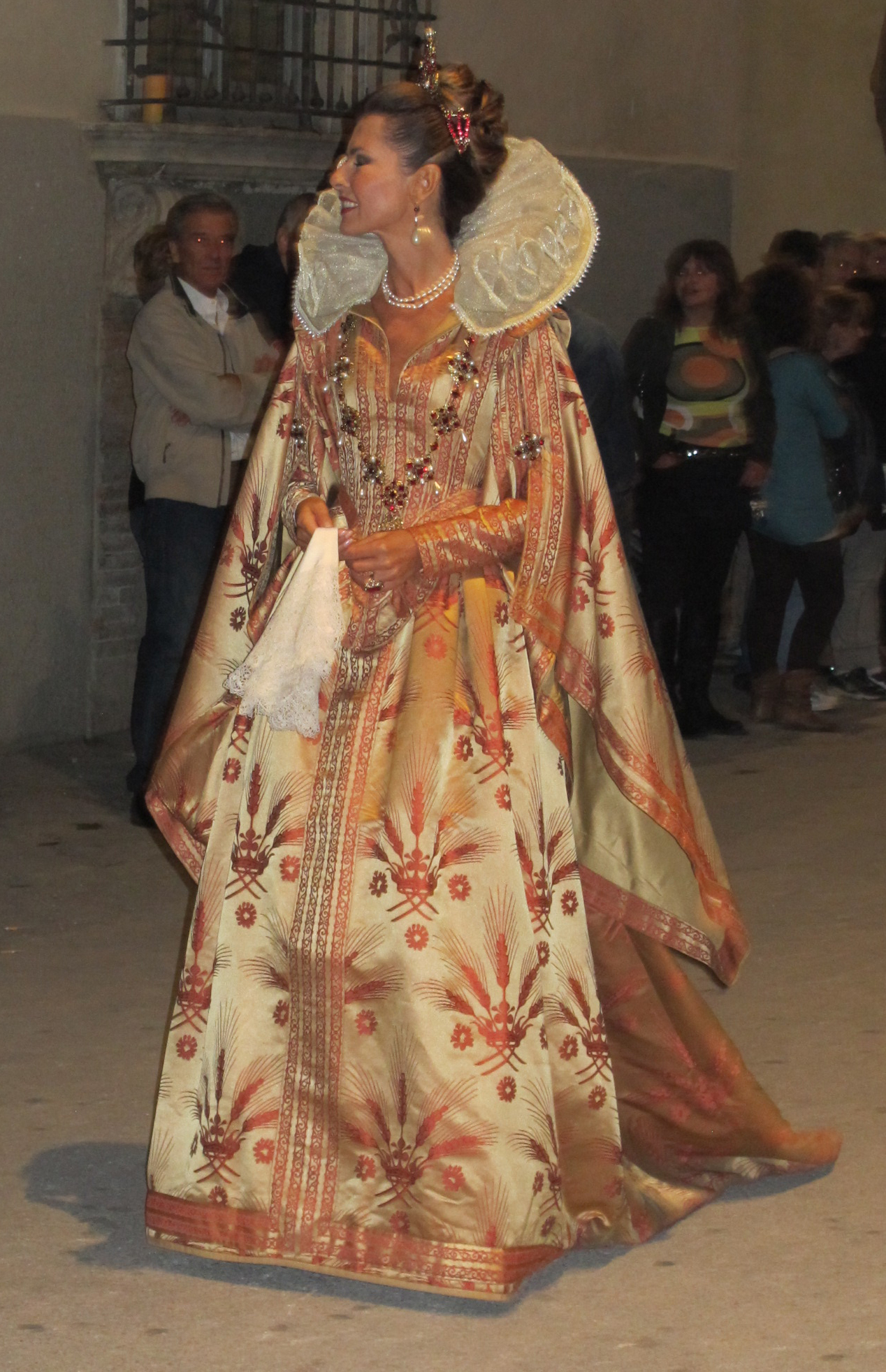
- Moro in 2012
- Born: Federica Moro; 20 February 1965 (age 61); Carate Brianza, Monza and Brianza, Italy
- Height: 5 ft 9 in (1.75 m)
- Beauty pageant titleholder
- Title: Miss Italia 1982
- Hair color: Dark brown
- Eye color: Brown
- Major competitions: Miss Italia 1982 (Winner); Miss Universe 1983 (Top 12)

Federica Moro (born 20 February 1965) is an Italian actress, model and beauty pageant titleholder who was Miss Italia 1982.

She began her career in 1982 when, at age 17, she won the title of Miss Italy in Sanremo. She then entered the film industry and became a major spokesperson for cosmetics.

== Career ==
Born in Carate Brianza passes her first part of life at Mariano Comense. She began her career in 1982 when, at age 17, she won the title of Miss Italia in Sanremo. This win opens the doors of the movie world, where she later recites in several films, after being classified in the top 15 of Miss Universe 1983. Already in 1983, Adriano Celentano was the protagonist of the film of specialty film: Segni particolari: bellissimo, where she interprets the part of a girl stealing her heart from the most implacable bachelor she knows, even coming to marry her.

The following year is Arianna in College, a film from which a large-scale television spin-off was released in 1990 by the same title, in which she is the lead performer. After another film at the side of Celentano (Joan Lui - But one day in the country I arrive on Monday), in 1986 she participated in the two episodes of Yuppies (Yuppies, Successful Youths and Yuppies 2).

Two years later, she plays in her first international film, La partita, directed by Carlo Vanzina. The film turns out to be very modest and it diminishes the cinematographic ambitions of the actress. In 1990 she was the protagonist of college, one of the cult festivals of the time with the boys of 3rd C; In fact, college had a great listening success, with 6 million viewers in replies, and great popularity among young people.

After College on Rai Due is one of the protagonists in Aquile, a TV set based on an Italian base and the life of some aeronautical pilots. There is virtually all flying aeronautical material (C-130, G-222, HH-3F, SF-260, MB-339, etc.). The productions that follow, Ultimo respiro and Tre addii, mark his last appearances on the big screen.

He later participates in numerous television broadcasts as a guest and becomes the testimonial of an important cosmetic home. He is the goddess of the Giostra della Quintana, a historic chivalrous event held in Foligno, every year, in June and September. He conducted, on Telenorba, L'Aia, a transmission on the tarantula and folk music of Puglia. He is currently involved in conducting the World Boat broadcast on Yacht & Sail.

In Lugano Switzerland, she hosted the Spring Ball Lugano / Monte-Carlo three times, organized by the Five Stars Events agency in Monaco. A Vip and Jet-Set dance sponsored by the Consulate of the Principality of Monaco in Lugano and supported by the City of Lugano.

== Filmography ==
=== Cinema ===
- Segni particolari: bellissimo (1983)
- College (1984)
- Joan Lui - Ma un giorno nel paese arrivo io di lunedì (1985)
- Yuppies (1986)
- Yuppies 2 (1986)
- Nessuno... Torna Indietro (1987)
- The Gamble (1988)
- Ultimo respiro (1992)

=== Television ===
- Aquile (1989)
- College (1990)
- Scoop (1992)
- Tre addii (1999)
