= Psycosissimo =

- Directed by: Steno
- Written by: Vittorio Metz; Roberto Gianviti; Steno
- Cinematography: Tino Santoni
- Music by: Carlo Rustichelli
- Distributed by: Variety Distribution
- Release date: 1961
- Country: Italy
- Language: Italian

Psycosissimo is a 1961 Italian crime-comedy film directed by Steno. The title is a parody of Alfred Hitchcock's Psycho.

== Cast ==
- Ugo Tognazzi as Ugo Bertolazzi
- Raimondo Vianello as Raimondo Vallardi
- Edy Vessel as Annalisa Michelotti
- Monique Just as Marcella Bertolazzi
- Franca Marzi as Clotilde Scarponi
- Spiros Focás as Pietro, Annalisa's Driver and Lover
- Francesco Mulé as Arturo Michelotti
- Leonardo Severini as Inspector
- Nerio Bernardi as Professor
- Toni Ucci as Augusto
- Renato Montalbano as Doctor
- Ugo Pagliai as Student
