= Maigret a Pigalle =

- Directed by: Mario Landi
- Written by: Sergio Amidei; Mario Landi; Pierre Kalfon
- Story by: Georges Simenon
- Starring: Gino Cervi
- Cinematography: Giuseppe Ruzzolini
- Music by: Armando Trovajoli
- Release date: 1966
- Country: Italy
- Language: Italian

Maigret a Pigalle (Maigret in Pigalle) is a 1966 Italian crime film directed by Mario Landi. It is based on the novel Maigret al Picratt's by Georges Simenon.

== Synopsis ==
One evening, Arlette, a stripper in a Paris nightclub called the "Picrate" in Pigalle, walks into a police station to inform Inspector Lognon of a crime. She overheard two strangers planning to assassinate an old countess in order to rob her of her gold. Nobody gives her any consideration, but in the following hours, the bodies of Arlette and the noblewoman are found; both died by strangulation. Inspector Maigret is about to depart for his annual leave, but he decides to stay in town to help his colleague Lognon in the investigations.

== Cast ==
- Gino Cervi: Maigret
- Lila Kedrova: Rose
- Raymond Pellegrin: Fred
- Alfred Adam: Lognon
- Josè Greci: Arlette
- Christian Barbier : Torrence
- Enzo Cerusico: Albert
- Riccardo Garrone: La Pointe
- Armando Bandini: Gatekeeper at Picrate
- Mario Feliciani: Director of the Criminal Investigation
- Marie-France Pisier (uncredited)

== See also ==
- Le inchieste del commissario Maigret (TV series, 1964–1972)
