= Romeo and Juliet (1964 film) =

- Directed by: Riccardo Freda
- Screenplay by: Riccardo Freda
- Starring: Geronimo Meynier; Rosemarie Dexter; Carlos Estrada
- Cinematography: Gábor Pogány
- Edited by: Anna Amedi
- Music by: Bruno Nicolai
- Production companies: Imprecine; Hispamer Film
- Distributed by: Titanus
- Release date: 28 August 1964 (Italy)
- Countries: Italy; Spain

Romeo and Juliet (Italian: Romeo e Giulietta) is a 1964 film directed and written by Riccardo Freda.

== Production ==
Riccardo Freda maintained that it was himself who had the idea to adapt Romeo and Juliet, having been an admirer of William Shakespeare since his youth and that he convinced Goffredo Lombardo, who had gone bankrupt after the production of Sodom and Gomorrah, to create the production company Imprecine and set up a co-production deal with Spain for this film and Genoveffa di Brabante. Other sources such as Stefano Della Casa state that Freda was commissioned to shoot a Shakespeare adaptation by the Spanish company Hispamer Films, and accepted only as it would allow him to make a period drama, which he could inject elements of his favourite genre, the adventure film. The film reinvents the Montague and Capulets as land and cattle owners with disputes over land pastures. Minutella had suggested that the elements are borrowed from Sergio Leone's Westerns of the period, which Italian film critic and historian Curti stated was impossible as the films were only released days apart from each other.

Geronimo Meynier was cast as Romeo in the film, which was his final acting role. Originally, Brett Halsey was going to play the lead, with Halsey stating that Freda planned to shoot the film in English in four weeks and feared he would not have adequate time for rehearsal and turned down the role, which led to Freda and him not speaking for years.

Romeo and Juliet was shot in Madrid and Ávila. Ruggero Deodato was an assistant director on set, and claimed that "Freda was a genius. I learned a lot from him. He was an intelligent person, cultured, and even a bit nasty on the set. He mistreated the crew, and to film a good chase on horseback, he did not hesitate to cripple the horses, even though he owned a stable... he always came up with ideas which I hadn't thought of, both on set as in the editing room."

== Release ==
Romeo and Juliet was released in Italy on 28 August 1964 where it was distributed by Titanus. The film grossed 50 million Italian lire domestically, which Curti described as "disappointing" and that the film "remained virtually unknown abroad." A few years later director Franco Zeffirelli directed his own adaptation of Romeo and Juliet, which Freda commented on later stating that "No one harmed Shakespeare more than Zeffirelli".
