= Obiettivo ragazze =

1963 film

- Film poster
- Directed by: Mario Mattoli
- Written by: Franco Castellano; Giuseppe Moccia
- Produced by: Isidoro Broggi; Renato Libassi
- Starring: Franco Franchi
- Cinematography: Riccardo Pallottini
- Edited by: Roberto Cinquini
- Music by: Gianni Ferrio
- Release date: 5 August 1963
- Running time: 99 minutes
- Country: Italy
- Language: Italian

Obiettivo ragazze is a 1963 Italian comedy film directed by Mario Mattoli and starring the comic duo Franco and Ciccio.

== Plot ==
Four ex-soldiers meet and reminisce about the times they were in the military: a parachutist mistaking his sergeant's home for a brothel, a hypnotized sailor that believes he changed his sex, and two soldiers captured by an African tribe.

== Cast ==
- Franco Franchi
- Ciccio Ingrassia as Franco
- Alighiero Noschese
- Walter Chiari as Alberto
- Vittorio Congia
- Diletta D'Andrea
- Renzo Palmer
- Elio Pandolfi as Aurelio
- Antonella Steni
- Carlo Campanini as Roberto
- Marisa Del Frate as Gina
- Tony Renis as himself
