= Anna Bolens =

Italian actress (1912 - 2002)

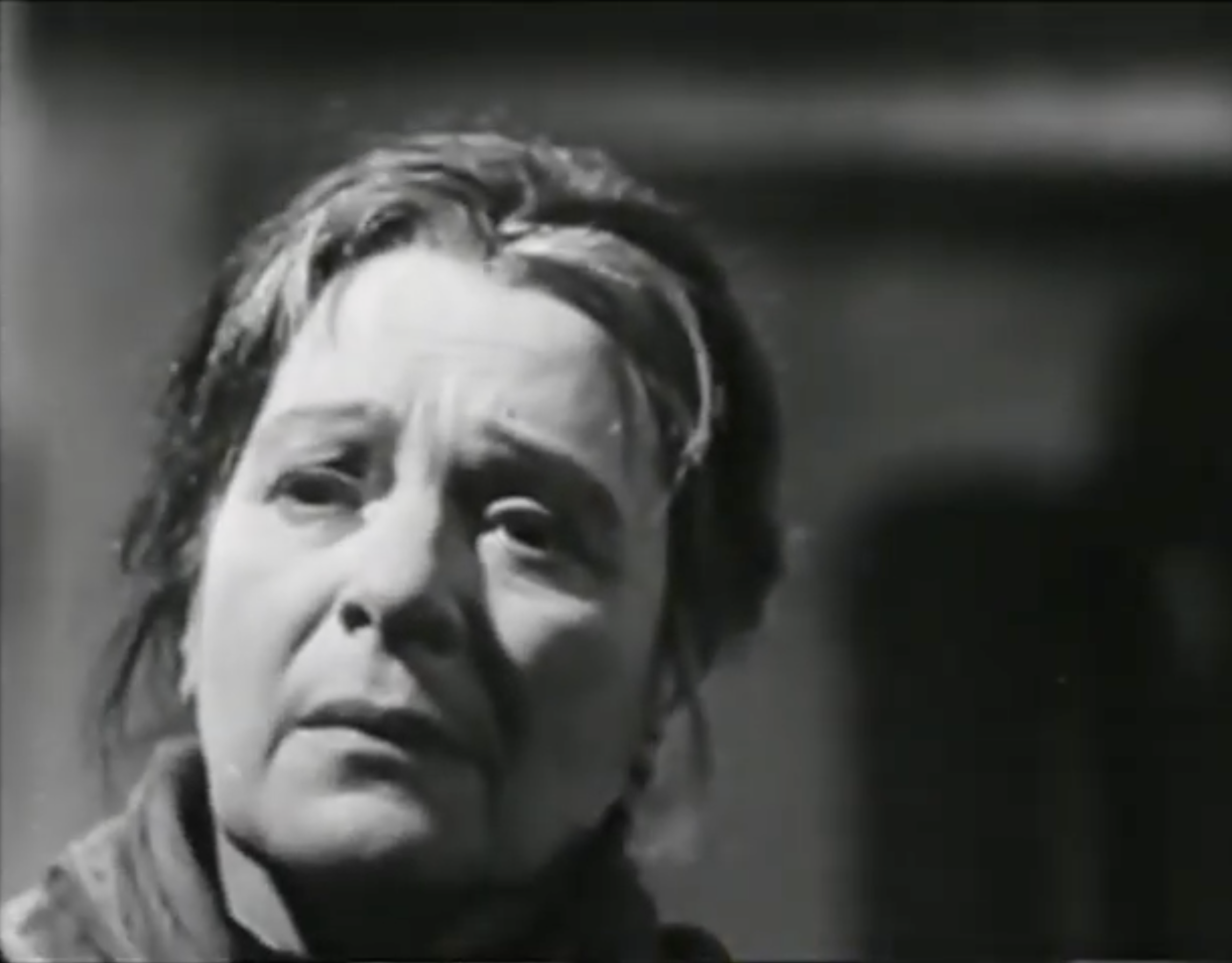
- Photo of Bolens
- Born: 1912
- Died: 6 October 2002 (aged 89–90)
- Citizenship: Italian
- Occupation: Actor

Anna Bolens (1912 – 2002) is an Italian actress known for her collaborations with Gilberto Govi.

Starting in the 1930s, she worked with the theater companies of Guglielmo Giannini, Aldo Fabrizi, and Kiki Palmer, and later collaborated extensively with Gilberto Govi. In 1961, she founded her own theater company, which remained active until 2010, after her death.

Among her major successes were Ten Little Indians by Agatha Christie, staged for two seasons at the Teatro delle Dieci in Turin between 1976 and 1977, her interpretations of Jean Cocteau and her direction of The Pelican by August Strindberg and Sancta Susanna by August Stramm. In addition to her theater work, she also worked as a voice actress and in radio and television acting.

She died on 6 October 2002, at the age of 90.
