= The Thursday =

1963 film

- Film poster
- Directed by: Dino Risi
- Written by: Franco Castellano; Giuseppe Moccia; Dino Risi
- Produced by: Dino De Laurentiis
- Starring: Walter Chiari; Michèle Mercier; Kessler Twins
- Cinematography: Alfio Contini
- Music by: Armando Trovajoli
- Release date: 1963
- Running time: 105 minutes
- Country: Italy
- Language: Italian

The Thursday (Italian: Il giovedì) is a 1963 Italian comedy film directed by Dino Risi. It was shown as part of a retrospective on Italian comedy at the 67th Venice International Film Festival.

== Cast ==
- Walter Chiari as Dino Versini
- Michèle Mercier as Elsa
- Roberto Ciccolini as Robertino
- Umberto D'Orsi as Rigoni
- Alice Kessler as herself
- Ellen Kessler as herself
- Silvio Bagolini as Doctor
- Emma Baron as Giulia
- Edy Biagetti
- Olimpia Cavalli as Olimpia
- Consalvo Dell'Arti as Concierge
- Margherita Horowitz as Kleptomaniac
- Salvo Libassi
- Liliana Maccalè (as Siliana Maccalè)
