= Giuseppe Moccia =

Italian screenwriter (1933–2006)

- Born: 22 June 1933; Viterbo, Italy
- Died: 20 August 2006 (aged 73); Rome, Italy
- Occupations: Screenwriter; film director
- Years active: 1958–2001
- Children: Federico Moccia

Giuseppe "Pipolo" Moccia (22 June 1933 – 20 August 2006) was an Italian screenwriter and film director. He wrote for 96 films between 1958 and 2001. He also directed 21 films between 1964 and 1997. Most of the films he co-wrote and co-directed as a part of the Castellano & Pipolo duo alongside Franco Castellano. Their 1984 film Il ragazzo di campagna was shown as part of a retrospective on Italian comedy at the 67th Venice International Film Festival.

He was born in Viterbo and died in Rome. His son, Federico, is a well-known writer and also a screenwriter and director.

== Selected filmography ==
- My Wife's Enemy (1959)
- Tipi da spiaggia (1959)
- Guardatele ma non toccatele (1959)
- Gentlemen Are Born (1960)
- Totò, Fabrizi e i giovani d'oggi (1960)
- The Two Rivals (1960)
- The Fascist (1961)
- Toto's First Night (1962)
- 5 marines per 100 ragazze (1962)
- Obiettivo ragazze (1963)
- The Thursday (1963)
- Slalom (1965)
- The Man, the Woman and the Money (1965)
- Tell Me You Do Everything for Me (1976)
- I nuovi mostri (1977)
- Il ragazzo di campagna (1984)
