= I ragazzi della 3ª C =

- Genre: Comedy
- Created by: Federico Moccia; Claudio Risi
- Directed by: Claudio Risi
- Starring: Fabio Ferrari; Renato Cestiè; Fabrizio Bracconieri; Sharon Gusberti; Stefania Dadda; Francesca Ventura; Giacomo Rosselli; Claudia Vegliante; Nicoletta Elmi; Antonio Allocca; Guido Nicheli
- Composer: Augusto Martelli
- Country of origin: Italy
- No. of seasons: 3
- No. of episodes: 33

Production
- Running time: 60 min (episode)

Original release
- Network: Italia 1
- Release: 13 January 1987 – 21 March 1989

I ragazzi della 3ª C (transl. The Boys of 3C) is an Italian teen comedy television series.

== Plot ==
The TV series, set in Italy in the 1980s, tells the story of a class at "Leopardi" high school in Rome, on the way to the final exams. It consists of three seasons for a total of 33 episodes broadcast from 1987 to 1989 on Italy 1, TV station of Fininvest (now Mediaset).

== See also ==
- List of Italian television series
