= Il ragazzo di campagna =

1984 film

- Film poster
- Directed by: Franco Castellano; Giuseppe Moccia
- Written by: Franco Castellano; Giuseppe Moccia
- Produced by: Luciano Luna; Achille Manzotti
- Starring: Renato Pozzetto; Massimo Boldi
- Cinematography: Danilo Desideri
- Edited by: Antonio Siciliano
- Music by: Detto Mariano
- Release date: 1984
- Running time: 92 minutes
- Country: Italy
- Language: Italian

Il ragazzo di campagna ("The country boy") is a 1984 Italian comedy film directed by Franco Castellano and Giuseppe Moccia. It was shown as part of a retrospective on Italian comedy at the 67th Venice International Film Festival.

Il ragazzo di campagna has a cult status in Italian culture in its satyrical representation of the contradictions of the hectic life in Milan in the mid-1980s, the years of the sorpasso (e.g., when Artemio resolves to take a taxi cab to cross the street in the impossibly trafficked Piazza San Babila). The inadequateness of Pozzetto-"country boy" in relating to Milan is reminiscent of that of Totò in another extremely popular film, Toto, Peppino, and the Hussy.

== Plot ==
Artemio (Pozzetto) is annoyed by his monotonous life as a farmer in the countryside of Lombardy. On his 40th birthday, he decides to move to the big city of Milan and look for a job and a new life there. There he meets his cousin Severino (Massimo Boldi), who is supposed to help him familiarize with the city, but actually turns out to be a trickster and purse snatcher. Having realized the illicitness of Severino's businesses, Artemio quits him. He later falls in love with a victim of Severino's snatching, a career girl named Angela. The gap between his countryman mentality and her modern and dynamic lifestyle leads to a number of comical misunderstandings, but also provides a basis for their friendship to grow. Meanwhile, Artemio's attempts at finding a job are impeded by his naivety and candor. The love affair with Angela seems to be taking a good fold, until Artemio understands that Angela is not interested in a stable relationship as that would interfere with her job. Disenchanted and disappointed, Artemio finally resolves to go back to his country town. There, he is welcomed by his long time admirer, Maria Rosa, who has in the meantime grown to a beautiful girl. When Angela unexpectedly visits Artemio, he rejects her in favor of Maria Rosa.

== Cast ==
- Renato Pozzetto as Artemio
- Massimo Serato as the rower
- Enzo Cannavale as the blind man
- Donna Osterbuhr as Angela
- Clara Colosimo as Giovanna - mother of Artemio
- Renato D'Amore as the blacksmith
- Massimo Boldi as Severino Cicerchia
- Sandra Ambrosini as Maria Rosa
- Dino Cassio as Commissario Polizia (Pirata)
- Armando Celso
- Franco Diogene as 1st Recruitment Manager
- Enzo Garinei as the manager of apartment house
- Jimmy il fenomeno
