= Winter Holidays =

Vacanze d'inverno
- Directed by: Camillo Mastrocinque; Giuliano Carnimeo
- Written by: Oreste Biancoli; Rodolfo Sonego; Camillo Mastrocinque; Jacques Sigurd dialogue : Jacques Sigurd; Dominique Feri; Story: Oreste Biancoli
- Produced by: Luigi Carpentieri; Ermanno Donati
- Cinematography: Aldo Tonti
- Edited by: Roberto Cinquini
- Music by: Armando Trovajoli
- Production companies: Athena Cinematografica; Gallus Films
- Release date: 18 June 1959
- Running time: 100 minutes
- Countries: Italy; France
- Language: Italian

Winter Holidays (Italian: Vacanze d'inverno) is a 1959 Italian comedy film directed by Camillo Mastrocinque and Giuliano Carnimeo (collaborating director), based on a story by Oreste Biancoli. The music score is by Armando Trovajoli.

== Cast ==
- Alberto Sordi as Roger Moretti
- Michèle Morgan as Steffa Tardier
- Georges Marchal as Georges Tardier
- Vittorio De Sica as Maurice
- Eleonora Rossi Drago as La comtesse Paola Parioli
- Denise Provence as Marceline
- Dorian Gray as Carol Field
- Vira Silenti as Vera
- Christine Kaufmann as Florence
- Geronimo Meynier as Franco
- Mario Valdemarin as Toni
- Arielle Coigney as Dina Moretti
- Renato Salvatori as Gianni
- Pierre Cressoy as Le comte Alfredo Parioli
- Ruggero Marchi as Produttore
- Enzo Turco as Magri
- Mercedes Brignone as Princess Valmarin
- Lola Braccini as Marchesa Serti
- Anna Campori as Virginia
