= The Fascist =

1961 film

Il federale
- Italian film poster
- Directed by: Luciano Salce
- Written by: Franco Castellano; Giuseppe Moccia; Luciano Salce
- Produced by: Dino De Laurentiis
- Starring: Ugo Tognazzi; Georges Wilson; Stefania Sandrelli
- Cinematography: Erico Menczer
- Edited by: Roberto Cinquini
- Music by: Ennio Morricone
- Release dates: 1961 (Italy); 17 June 1965 (U.S.)
- Running time: 100 minutes
- Country: Italy
- Language: Italian

The Fascist (Italian: Il federale) is a 1961 Italian comedy-drama film directed by Luciano Salce.

It was coproduced with France. It was also the first feature film scored by Ennio Morricone.

== Plot ==
In 1944, Italy is divided between the fascist state Repubblica Sociale Italiana (RSI), which retains control of the northern and central half of the country, and the Allied-occupied southern half. Fascist bosses gathered in Cremona pick militant Primo Arcovazzi to take into custody professor Bonafè, a noted anti-fascist philosopher and agreed upon new government leader among the opposition forces who prepare the new democratic government after the war. Primo is lured by the promise of a promotion. During a first raid at the professor's home, Primo does not recognize Bonafè, who escapes to his family residence in rural Abruzzo.

Equipped with a motorcycle-sidecar combination, Primo captures Bonafè and must lead him to Rome, still controlled by the RSI. En route, they have an accident to avoid running over a girl, who turns out to be a thief. They share part of the way after the motorcycle is wrecked, but the girl disappears after having scammed Bonafè out of 150 lire.

Primo asks for assistance with his vehicle to Wehrmacht soldiers passing by. But his sidecar gets confiscated and the two are taken prisoner by the Germans, who recognize Bonafè as they have him in a list of wanted men, due to a publication opposing the persecution of Jews.

The couple escape thanks to Bonafè's ability to improvise an explosive formula, and taking advantage of confusion during an allied air raid. Bonafè dons a German uniform to pass unnoticed during the commotion. While Primo is stealing a Schwimmwagen to continue his mission, Bonafè tries in vain to desert him.

The following night, the two men stop to sleep in a barn and meet again the girl. The trio eventually reconcile over the attempts to capture and cook a chicken for dinner.

In the morning, the girl leaves with all of Primo's and Bonafè's clothes and accessories, except for their Schwimmwagen. Depressed, Primo tries to continue his mission. He attempts to ford a stream, but, due to previous damage or his own ineptitude, the Schwimmwagen sinks.

Upon reaching a village on foot, Primo tries to ask for help at the local fascist party cell ("Casa del Fascio"). The place is however deserted, and the only people around are armed, fascist teenagers. Primo is kept at gun point until able to prove his knowledge of fascist lore. Only Bonafè's help allows him to answer the last challenge and to avoid being shot. After gaining the teenagers' trust, Primo is only able to confiscating a tandem bicycle and a pistol.

Again the duo has to stop when bursting a tire, in the town of Rocca Sabina. It is the home of nationalist poet Arcangelo Bardacci, whom he idolizes and whose writings prompted him to become a fascist. Upon reaching Bardacci's house, he hears that the poet had joined the Regia Aeronautica in Albania and perished in a plane crash. Bardacci is actually alive, planning to hide in the cellar until the fascist regime collapses.

Bonafè discovers this and is allowed to escape in exchange of a promise to assist with Bardacci's political rehabilitation in the future. Primo eventually catches Bonafè once again. For a while the two can travel on a methane powered pullman, but during one stop, Bonafè escapes again. By the time Primo recaptures him, the pullman is gone and again they must walk, eventually reaching Rome's outskirts early June.

Upon meeting once again the girl, he demands back his clothes but accepts her "even better" offer of a fascist "Federale" uniform, anticipating his promotion for Bonafè's delivery. Unbeknown to them, Rome has been conquered by the Allies. GIs are celebrating their victory, but Primo mistakes them for war prisoners.

Primo is initially mocked by the GIs that they meet further on and is eventually spotted by resistance fighters. They and other civilians attack Primo, who is about to be lynched. However, Bonafè saves Primo, pretending to shoot him. In reality, Bonafè throws away Primo's uniform and offers his owm jacket to allow him to hide. Primo is let go, while Bonafè joins the resistance leaders to prepare a post-war free government.

== Cast ==
- Ugo Tognazzi as Primo Arcovazzi
- Georges Wilson as Professor Erminio Bonafè
- Stefania Sandrelli as Lisa
- Gianrico Tedeschi: Arcangelo Bardacci
- Elsa Vazzoler as Matilde Bardacci
- Gianni Agus as Cremona fascist boss
- Luciano Salce as German Lieutenant
- Renzo Palmer as Partisan Taddei

== Reception ==
John Simon of the National Review called Il federale "one of my favorite films of all time".

== See also ==
- Military history of Italy during World War II
- Allied invasion of Italy
- Rome, Open City, Paisà, General della Rovere, Violent Summer, Long Night in 1943, Escape by Night, Two Women, Everybody Go Home, The Four Days of Naples, Salò o le 120 giornate di Sodoma
