= Sergio Raimondi =

Argentine poet

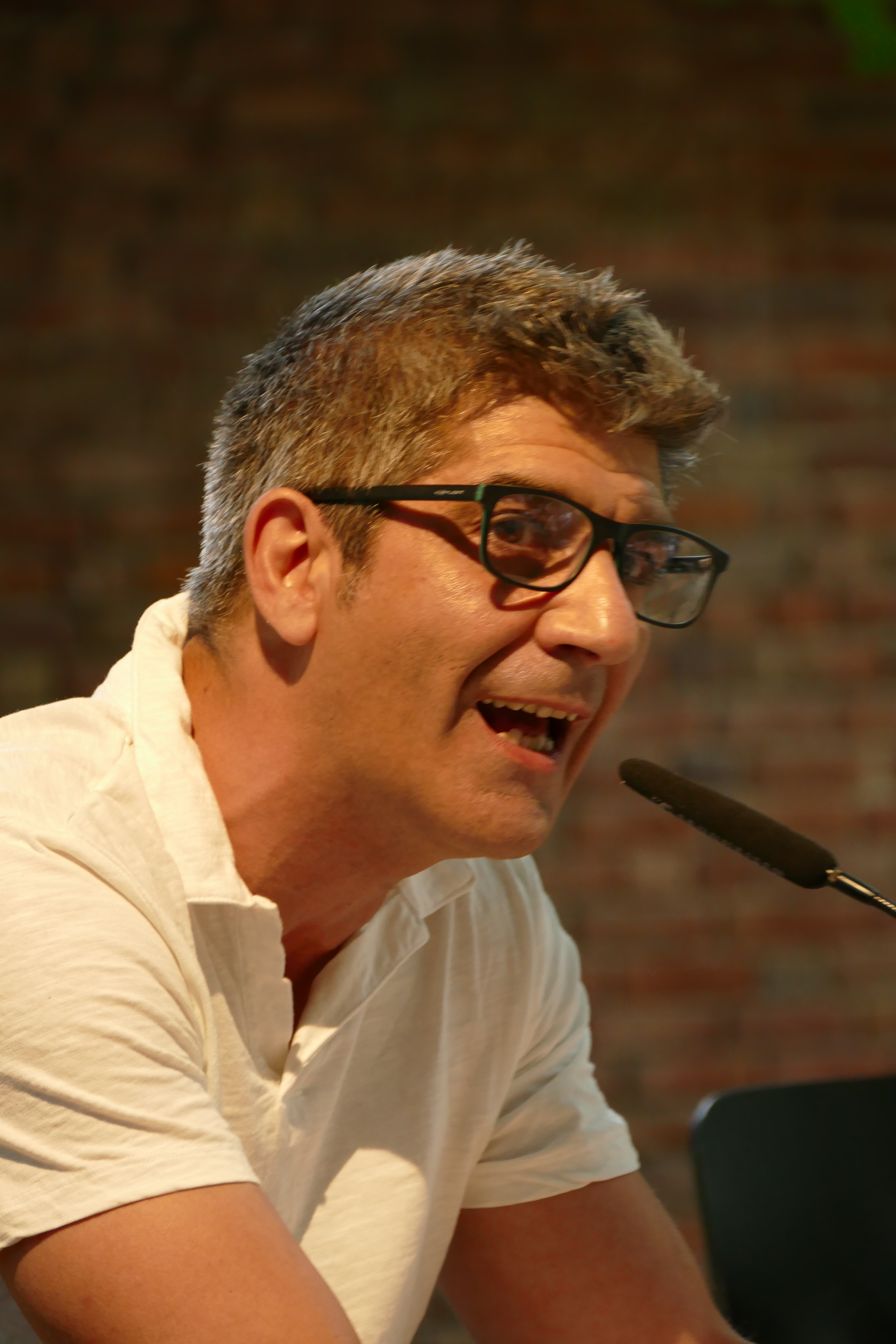
Sergio Raimondi at the Poesiefestival in Berlin 2018

Sergio Raimondi (1968, Bahía Blanca) is an Argentine poet. He is also a professor at Universidad Nacional del Sur, where he is in charge of the subject Contemporary Literature (I & II). Until June, 2011, he was the director of the Museo del Puerto de Ingeniero White.

== Awards ==
- 2007 Guggenheim Fellowship

== Works ==
- "Limón solo"; "se queman los ojos pero no se ven astros"; "el tema"; "Egipto", La Corota, January 19, 2005
- Catulito Vox, 1999 (translations of [Catullus]'s poetry)
- Poesía civil Bahia Blanca: Vox, 2001
- Zivilpoesie, Berlin, Wissenschaftlicher Verlag Berlin, 2005, ISBN 978-3-86573-112-8
- Für ein kommentiertes Wörterbuch, Berlin, Berenberg Verlag, 2012, ISBN 978-3-937834-58-0

=== Anthologies ===
- "Di fronte a un esplanare di Defense of Poetry"; "Il poeta minore alla nascito del figlio"; "Pittori della domenica a Puerto Piojo", Smerialliana. Semestrale di civilta poetiche, Volumes 7-8, Lìbrati Editrice, 2007, ISBN 978-88-87691-50-4
