= Juke box urli d'amore =

- Directed by: Mauro Morassi
- Written by: Ugo Guerra; Fabio De Agostini; Ottavio Alessi
- Produced by: Mario Pescino
- Starring: Mario Carotenuto; Marisa Merlini; Karin Baal
- Cinematography: Luciano Trasatti
- Edited by: Mario Serandrei
- Music by: Ezio Leoni
- Distributed by: A.C.I. di
- Release date: 1959
- Running time: 93 minutes
- Country: Italy
- Language: Italian

Juke box - Urli d'amore is a 1959 Italian musicarello film directed by Mauro Morassi. The film stars Mario Carotenuto and contains cameos by singers Mina and Adriano Celentano.

== Plot ==
Mario, a little slacker who thrives on his wits, has just been released from prison after serving a sentence for scam. Always looking for a way to make ends meet without working by taking advantage of the gullibility of others, he meets Marisa, a mature woman, owner of a record company. Marisa, although she soon realizes who she is dealing with, despite everything, she falls in love with him and is even willing to marry him. To strengthen her intention, the woman decides to impose the blocking of the wedding on her employees: in fact, no one will be able to marry until she is married. The fact is that among the employees there are some couples who have already fixed their wedding day...

== Cast ==
- Mario Carotenuto as Mario
- Marisa Merlini as Marisa
- Mario Girotti as Otello
- Raffaele Pisu as Orlando
- Aroldo Tieri as the accountant Anzillotto
- Aldo Giuffrè as Bruno
- Tiberio Murgia as Calogero
- Mara Berni as Domenica
- Tiberio Mitri as Kid la tigre
- Fedele Gentile as brigadiere
- Ciccio Barbi as singer
- Adriano Celentano as singer
- Mina as singer
- Giorgio Gaber as singer
- Grazia Maria Spina
- Pina Gallini
- Karin Baal Otello's girlfriend
- Gordana Miletic
- Dori Dorika (Dorika Dory) as Franchina
- Wanda Ibba as singer
- Coleen Hicks as singer
- Leopoldo Valentini
- Jacqueline Derval
- Germano Longo

== Censorship ==
When Juke box urli d'amore was first released in Italy in 1959 the Committee for the Theatrical Review of the Italian Ministry of Cultural Heritage and Activities rated it as VM16: not suitable for children under 16. In addition the committee imposed the following revisions: 1) the scene in which “Diva del Varietà” appears, half-undressed, and she displays the back of her body wiggling her hips obscenely; 2) the scene in which Anzilotto attempts to rape Elsa; 3) the scene in which Rosa appears on the bed wearing a negligee with her legs excessively uncovered. The official document number is: 31287, it was signed on 17 November 1959 by Minister Domenico Magrì.
