= Slalom (1965 film) =

1965 film

- Film poster
- Directed by: Luciano Salce
- Written by: Franco Castellano; Giuseppe Moccia
- Produced by: Mario Cecchi Gori
- Starring: Vittorio Gassman
- Cinematography: Alfio Contini
- Edited by: Marcello Malvestito
- Music by: Ennio Morricone
- Release date: 24 September 1965
- Running time: 108 minutes
- Country: Italy
- Language: Italian

Slalom is a 1965 Italian comedy film directed by Luciano Salce and starring Vittorio Gassman.

== Plot ==
Lucio and Riccardo, a pair of married pals, take their wives on a ski vacation in Sestriere but get distracted by the beautiful and seductive Nadia and Helen, who lure them into unexpected adventure and danger where Lucio is forced to go to Egypt with another passport and identity.

== Cast ==
- Vittorio Gassman as Lucio Ridolfi
- Adolfo Celi as Riccardo
- Daniela Bianchi as Nadia
- Lobna Abdel Aziz as Fahra, Egyptian flight attendant (as Loubna A.Aziz)
- Beba Lončar as Helen
- Emma Danieli as Hilde, Lucio's wife
- Bob Oliver as George
- Nagwa Fouad as Nabila
- Corrado Olmi as Italian Consulat Official
- Isabella Biagini as Simonetta, Riccardo's wife
- Piero Vida as The Murderer
