= Franco Castellano =

Italian film director (1925–1999)

- Born: 20 June 1925; Rome, Italy
- Died: 28 December 1999 (aged 74); Rome, Italy
- Occupations: Screenwriter; film director
- Years active: 1958–1997

Franco Castellano (20 June 1925 – 28 December 1999) was an Italian screenwriter and film director. He wrote for 94 films between 1958 and 1997. He also directed 21 films between 1964 and 1992. Most of the films he co-wrote and co-directed as a part of the Castellano & Pipolo duo alongside Giuseppe Moccia. Their 1984 film Il ragazzo di campagna was shown as part of a retrospective on Italian comedy at the 67th Venice International Film Festival.

== Selected filmography ==
- My Wife's Enemy (1959)
- Tipi da spiaggia (1959)
- Guardatele ma non toccatele (1959)
- Gentlemen Are Born (1960)
- Totò, Fabrizi e i giovani d'oggi (1960)
- The Two Rivals (1960)
- The Fascist (1961)
- 5 marines per 100 ragazze (1962)
- Toto's First Night (1962)
- Obiettivo ragazze (1963)
- The Thursday (1963)
- Three Nights of Love (1964)
- Slalom (1965)
- The Man, the Woman and the Money (1965)
- Di che segno sei? (1975)
- Tell Me You Do Everything for Me (1976)
- Il ragazzo di campagna (1984)
