= Attila flagello di Dio =

1982 Italian film by Castellano e Pipolo

- Theatrical release poster by Renato Casaro
- Directed by: Castellano e Pipolo
- Written by: Castellano e Pipolo
- Story by: Mario Cecchi Gori; Castellano e Pipolo
- Starring: Diego Abatantuono
- Cinematography: Alberto Spagnoli
- Edited by: Raimondo Crociani
- Music by: Armando Trovajoli
- Production company: Intercapital
- Distributed by: Titanus
- Release date: 22 November 1982
- Running time: 91 minutes
- Country: Italy
- Language: Italian

Attila flagello di Dio ("Attila Scourge of God") is a 1982 Italian comedy film written and directed by Castellano e Pipolo.

== Plot ==
The misadventures of a tribe of barbarians from Lombardy whose leader erroneously identifies with Attila and who wants to lead the army to Rome and take back what the Romans have stolen from their people.

== Cast ==
- Diego Abatantuono as Attila
- Mauro Di Francesco as Tartufo
- Rita Rusic as Uraia
- Angelo Infanti as Fusco Cornelio
- Toni Ucci as Fabio Massimo
- Franz Di Cioccio as Giallo
- Francesco Salvi as Barbaro Grippo
- Vincenzo Crocitti as Osvaldo
- Tony Kendall as Serpicio
- Anna Kanakis as Sirena

== See also ==
- List of Italian films of 1982
