= My Wife's Enemy =

1959 Italian comedy film

- Film poster
- Directed by: Gianni Puccini
- Written by: Bruno Baratti; Franco Castellano; Gino Mangini; Giuseppe Moccia; Gianni Puccini
- Produced by: Isidoro Broggi; Renato Libassi
- Starring: Marcello Mastroianni; Giovanna Ralli; Memmo Carotenuto; Luciana Paluzzi; Giacomo Furia; Riccardo Garrone; Andrea Cecchi; Raimondo Vianello; Gisella Sofio; Vittorio De Sica; Teddy Reno
- Cinematography: Gianni Di Venanzo
- Edited by: Gisa Radicchi Levi
- Music by: Lelio Luttazzi
- Release date: 1959
- Running time: 100 minutes
- Country: Italy
- Language: Italian

My Wife's Enemy (Italian: Il nemico di mia moglie) is a 1959 Italian comedy film directed by Gianni Puccini.

== Cast ==
- Marcello Mastroianni - Marco Tornabuoni
- Giovanna Ralli - Luciana, sua moglie
- Vittorio De Sica - Ottavio Terenzi, padre di Marco
- Memmo Carotenuto - Nando Terenzi, padre di Lucia
- Luciana Paluzzi - Giulia
- Andrea Checchi - Dr. Giuliani
- Teddy Reno - Himself
- Giacomo Furia - Peppino
- Riccardo Garrone - Michele
- Raimondo Vianello - Mister La Corata
- Enzo Garinei - Scienziato tedesco
- Gisella Sofio - Worker
