= Franco Rossi (director) =

Italian film screenwriter and director

Franco Rossi (19 April 1919, Florence – 5 June 2000, Rome) was an Italian film screenwriter and director, mainly known for having directed the six-hour Italian-German-British-Swiss TV mini-series Quo Vadis? in 1985.

== Biography ==
Rossi was born in Florence, Italy. He studied law and then began to work on theatre. He was assistant director of Mario Camerini, Luis Trenker, Renato Castellani, Aldo Vergano. Rossi made his debut as a director with the crime thriller I Falsari. He went on to have his first success with Il seduttore, starring by Alberto Sordi, and among Rossi's other films were The Woman in the Painting (Amici per la pelle, 1955), Odissea Nuda (1961), "Smog" (1962), Three Nights of Love (1964), an episode of Le bambole (1965), and Porgi l'altra guancia with Bud Spencer (1974).

Rossi was one of the first established Italian film directors also doing work for television, being one of the three directors for the 1968 mini-series L'Odissea. His largest TV undertaking was directing the international co-production of the six-hour mini-series Quo Vadis? in 1985.

== Filmography ==
Rossi was involved in the direction of 33 feature films or TV films/TV mini-series between 1951 and 1994, according to the Internet Movie Database.

- 1951: The Counterfeiters
- 1952: Solo per te Lucia
- 1953: The Counterfeiters
- 1954: Il seduttore
- 1955: Friends for Life
- 1958: Amore a prima vista
- 1958: Calypso
- 1959: Death of a Friend
- 1959: Everyone's in Love (supervisor)
- 1961: Nude Odyssey
- 1962: Smog
- 1964: Countersex (segment "Cocaina di domenica")
- 1964: High Infidelity (segment "Scandaloso")
- 1964: Three Nights of Love (segment "La moglie bambina")
- 1965: I complessi (segment "Il complesso della schiava nubiana")
- 1965: Le bambole (segment "La minestra")
- 1966: Make Love, Not War
- 1967: The Witches (segment "La siciliana")
- 1967: A Rose for Everyone
- 1968: Caprice Italian Style (segment "Viaggio di lavoro")
- 1968: The Odyssey (TV mini-series)
- 1969: Youth March
- 1971: Eneide (TV serial)
- 1974: Il giovane Garibaldi (TV mini-series)
- 1974: Two Missionaries / Turn the Other Cheek
- 1976: Pure as a Lily
- 1977: L'altra metà del cielo
- 1982: Storia d'amore e d'amicizia (TV series)
- 1985: Quo Vadis? (TV mini-series)
- 1987: Lo scialo (TV mini-series)
- 1987: Un bambino di nome Gesù (TV movie)
- 1994: Michele va alla guerra (TV movie)

== Preservation ==
Smog was preserved and restored by Fondazione Cineteca di Bologna and the UCLA Film & Television Archive in collaboration with Warner Bros. Entertainment, Inc. from the 35mm original picture negative, a 35mm composite fine grain master positive and a 35mm optical track negative. Restoration funding was provided by the Golden Globe Foundation. The restoration had its Los Angeles premiere at the 2024 UCLA Festival of Preservation.
