= Guardatele ma non toccatele =

1959 film

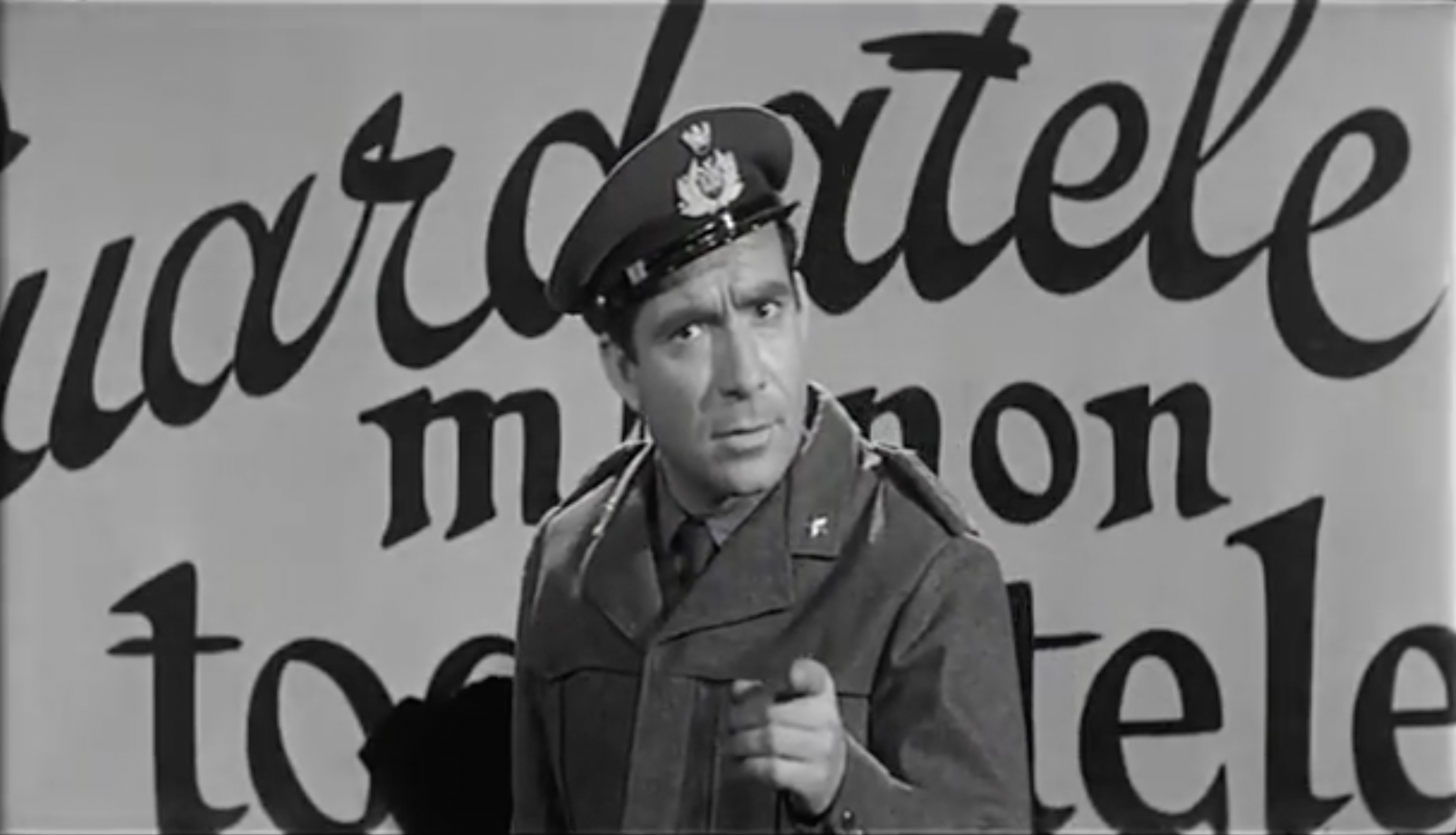
- Tognazzi in a film scene
- Directed by: Mario Mattoli
- Written by: Bruno Baratti; Franco Castellano; Giuseppe Moccia; Ettore Scola
- Produced by: Isidoro Broggi; Renato Libassi
- Starring: Ugo Tognazzi
- Cinematography: Riccardo Pallottini
- Edited by: Gisa Radicchi Levi
- Release date: 1959
- Running time: 90 minutes
- Country: Italy
- Language: Italian

Guardatele ma non toccatele is a 1959 Italian comedy film directed by Mario Mattoli and starring Ugo Tognazzi.

== Cast ==
The cast included:

- Ugo Tognazzi – Maresciallo La Notte
- Caprice Chantal – Rebecca O'Connor
- Johnny Dorelli – Tenente Altieri
- Lynn Shaw – Un'ausiliara
- Bice Valori – Irma La Notte
- Corrado Pani – Claudio
- Liana Orfei – Un'ausiliaria
- Edy Vessel – ausiliaria americana bionda
- Raimondo Vianello – Il colonnello
- Fred Buscaglione – Himself
- Bruce Cabot – Il pilota americano DC-3
- Chelo Alonso – Pepita un'ausiliaria latino-americana
- Giacomo Furia – Addetto allo spaccio
- Rik Van Nutter – secondo pilota americano.
