= Toto, Fabrizi and the Young People Today =

1960 film

- Film poster
- Directed by: Mario Mattoli
- Written by: Castellano & Pipolo
- Produced by: Isidoro Broggi; Renato Libassi; Gianni Minervini
- Starring: Totò; Aldo Fabrizi
- Cinematography: Alvaro Mancori
- Edited by: Gisa Radicchi Levi
- Music by: Gianni Ferrio
- Release date: 1960
- Running time: 87 minutes
- Country: Italy
- Language: Italian

Toto, Fabrizi and the Young People Today (Italian: Totò, Fabrizi e i giovani d'oggi) is a 1960 Italian comedy film directed by Mario Mattoli and starring Totò.

== Plot ==
Two bourgeois families live in Rome: the family of the "Cavaliere del Lavoro" Antonio Cocozza, owner of a pastry shop, father of Gabriella, and that of professor Giuseppe D'Amore, father of Carlo. Carlo and Gabriella love each other happily, so when they think of getting married, they want the two families to get to know each other. While the women make friends, Antonio and Giuseppe immediately begin to fight for anything, and the quarrels continue even when the couple have to choose the wedding dress, the house where to move, the organization of the wedding and reception. Gabriella and Carlo, tired of the constant bickering of the fathers, decide to run away, wanting to scare the parents, to get the wedding at all costs.

== Cast ==
- Totò as Antonio Cocozza
- Aldo Fabrizi as Giuseppe D'Amore
- Christine Kaufmann as Gabriella Cocozza
- Geronimo Meynier as Carlo D'Amore
- Luigi Pavese as Il commendator La Sarta
- Angela Luce
- Liana Del Balzo
- Nando Angelini
- Carlo Pisacane as Il nonno
- Ester Carloni
- Serenella Verdirosi
- Franca Marzi as Matilde Cocozza
- Rina Morelli as Teresa D'Amore
- Renato Mambor as Ermanno Tazzoli

== Bibliography ==
- Aprà, Adriano. The Fabulous Thirties: Italian cinema 1929-1944. Electa International, 1979.
