= 5 marines per 100 ragazze =

1961 film by Mario Mattoli

- Film poster
- Directed by: Mario Mattoli
- Written by: Castellano & Pipolo
- Produced by: Antonio Colantuoni
- Starring: Virna Lisi; Mario Carotenuto; Hélène Chanel; Little Tony; Vicky Ludovisi; Vittorio Congia; Daniela Calvino
- Cinematography: Riccardo Pallottini
- Edited by: Roberto Cinquini
- Music by: Gianni Ferrio
- Release date: 1961
- Running time: 96 minutes
- Country: Italy
- Language: Italian

5 marines per 100 ragazze is a 1961 Italian musicarello comedy film directed by Mario Mattoli and starring Virna Lisi.

== Cast ==
- Virna Lisi as Grazia
- Mario Carotenuto as Admiral Michigan
- Hélène Chanel as Elena
- Little Tony as Tony Collina
- Vittorio Congia as Charlie
- Daniela Calvino as Aurora
- Paul Wynter as Sam
- Raffaella Carrà as Mirella
- Sergio Raimondi as Robert
- Franco Franchi as Factotum
- Ciccio Ingrassia as Factotum
- Pietro De Vico as Attendant
- Bice Valori as Director
- Raimondo Vianello as General Patterson
- Ugo Tognazzi as Sgt. Imparato
