= Gentlemen Are Born (1960 film) =

1960 film

- Film poster
- Directed by: Mario Mattoli
- Written by: Edoardo Anton; Franco Castellano; Dino Falconi; Giuseppe Moccia; Luigi Motta
- Produced by: Isidoro Broggi; Renato Libassi
- Starring: Totò, Peppino De Filippo, Carlo Croccolo, Delia Scala, Riccardo Garrone
- Cinematography: Alvaro Mancori
- Edited by: Gisa Radicchi Levi
- Music by: Gianni Ferrio
- Distributed by: D.D.L.
- Release date: 1960
- Running time: 95 minutes
- Country: Italy
- Language: Italian

Gentlemen Are Born (Italian: Signori si nasce) is a 1960 Italian historical comedy film directed by Mario Mattoli and starring Totò, Peppino De Filippo and Delia Scala.

== Plot ==
Rome 1906: Baron Ottone Spinelli degli Ulivi, said Zaza, is a rich spendthrift who likes pretty girls. His brother Pio degli Ulivi is a miser tailor who hates Zazà because he is always in his house asking for money to pay off family debts. One day Zazà intends steal 300 lire to his brother, and makes him believe that he has a daughter to support.

== Cast ==
- Totò as Ottone Degli Ulivi, also known as Zazà
- Peppino De Filippo as Pio Degli Ulivi, Ottone's brother
- Delia Scala as Patrizia
- Riccardo Garrone as Enzo, Patrizia's fiancé
- Lidia Martora as Maria Luisa, Pio's wife
- Luigi Pavese as Bernasconi
- Angela Luce as Fedele, Pio's maid
- Dori Dorika as Adelina Maniglia
- Nico Pepe as Binotti
- Liana Orfei as Titì
- Carlo Croccolo as Battista, Ottone's butler

== Bibliography ==
- Aprà, Adriano. The Fabulous Thirties: Italian cinema 1929-1944. Electa International, 1979.
