= Tipi da spiaggia =

1959 film

- Film poster
- Directed by: Mario Mattoli
- Written by: Castellano & Pipolo
- Produced by: Isidoro Broggi; Renato Libassi
- Starring: Johnny Dorelli
- Music by: Gianni Ferrio
- Release date: 1959
- Running time: 97 minutes
- Country: Italy
- Language: Italian

Tipi da spiaggia (Italian for 'Beach Types') is a 1959 Italian comedy film directed by Mario Mattoli and starring Johnny Dorelli.

== Cast ==
- Ugo Tognazzi: Pasubio Giovinezza
- Christiane Martel: Barbara Patton
- Giustino Durano: Nick Balmora
- Johnny Dorelli: Giorgio Binotti
- Lauretta Masiero: Silvia Barentson
- Gino Buzzanca: Giovanni
- Edy Vessel: Lucy
- Liana Orfei: Magalì
- Annie Gorassini: Hildegarde
- Cesare Polacco: Prince Joakim
- Luciano Salce: Dr. Ionescu
