= Vittorio De Sica filmography =

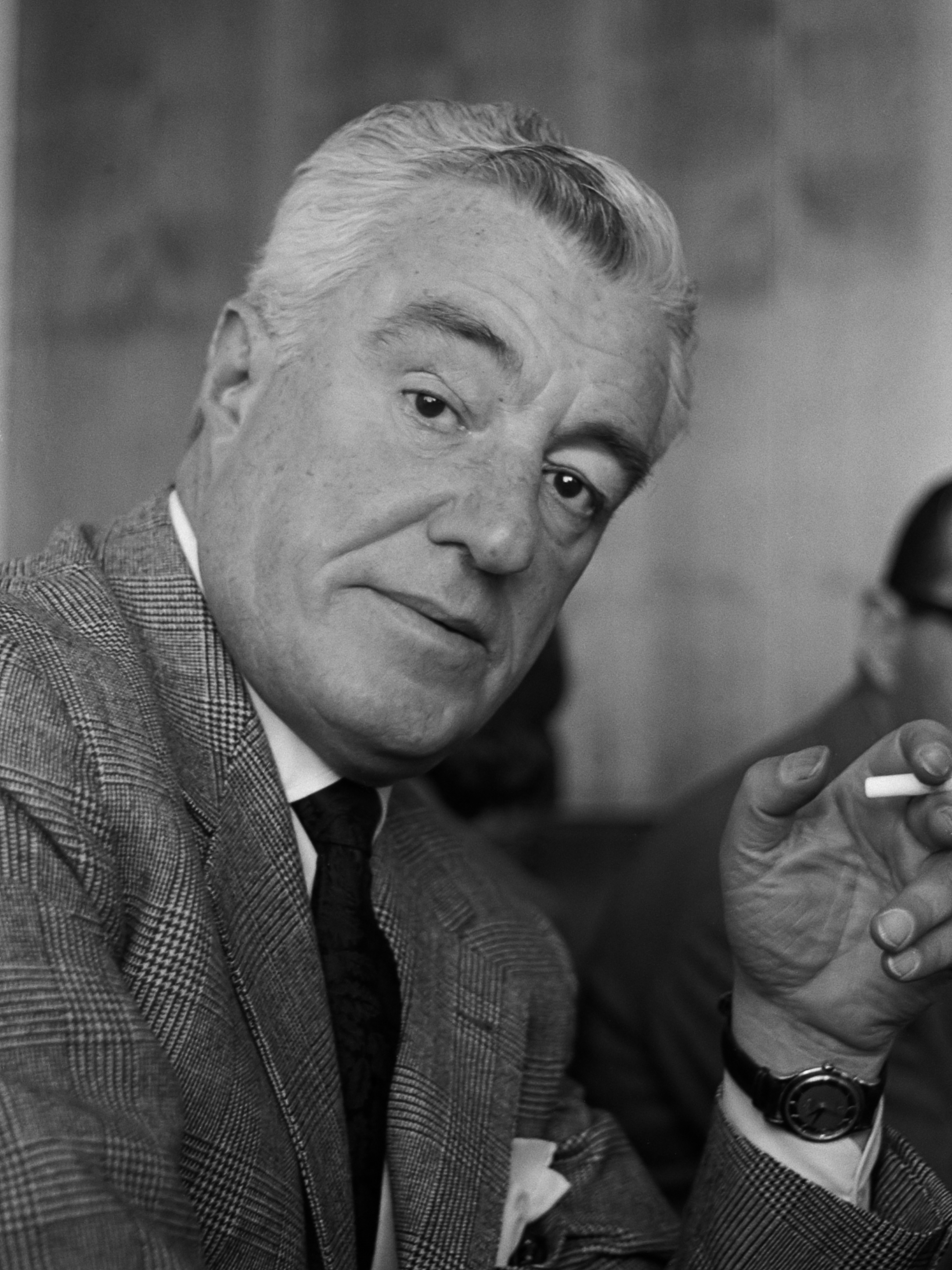
De Sica in 1962

Vittorio De Sica (7 July 1901 – 13 November 1974) was an Italian filmmaker and actor. He became a popular leading actor in interwar Italy where he primarily performed in comedic roles. Shortly after the World War II, he became one of the major filmmakers of the neorealist movement (Neorealismo). Four of his films have won the Academy Award for Best Foreign Film.

Vittorio De Sica's acting and directing screen credits consist of:

== Filmography ==
=== Directing credits ===
Year	English title	Original title	Notes
1940	Red Roses	Rose scarlatte	Co-directed with Giuseppe Amato
1940	Maddalena, Zero for Conduct	Maddalena, zero in condotta	
1941	Do You Like Women	Teresa Venerdì	
1942	A Garibaldian in the Convent	Un garibaldino al convento	
1944	The Children Are Watching Us	I bambini ci guardano	
1945	The Gate of Heaven	La porta del cielo	
1946	Shoeshine	Sciuscià	Academy Award for Best Foreign Film – Special Award
1948	Heart and Soul	Cuore	Co-directed with Duilio Coletti
1948	Bicycle Thieves	Ladri di biciclette	Academy Award for Best Foreign Film – Special Award
1951	Miracle in Milan	Miracolo a Milano	
1952	Umberto D.		
1953	Terminal Station	Stazione Termini	
1954	The Gold of Naples	L'oro di Napoli	
1956	The Roof	Il Tetto	
1958	Anna of Brooklyn	Anna di Brooklyn	Co-directed with Carlo Lastricati
1960	Two Women	La Ciociara	
1961	The Last Judgment	Il Giudizio universale	
1962	The Condemned of Altona	I sequestrati di Altona	
1962	Boccaccio '70		segment La riffa
1963	Il Boom		
1963	Yesterday, Today and Tomorrow	Ieri, oggi e domani	Academy Award for Best Foreign Film – Winner
1964	Marriage Italian-Style	Matrimonio all'italiana	Academy Award for Best Foreign Film – Nominee
1966	Un monde nouveau		
1966	After the Fox	Caccia alla volpe	
1967	Woman Times Seven	Sette Volte Donna	
1967	The Witches	Le streghe	segment Una sera come le altre
1968	A Place for Lovers	Amanti	
1970	Sunflower	I Girasoli	
1970	The Garden of the Finzi-Continis	Il Giardino dei Finzi-Contini	Academy Award for Best Foreign Film – Winner
1970	Man and Wife	Le coppie	segment Il Leone
1971	From Referendum to the Constitution: 2 June	Dal referendum alla costituzione: Il 2 giugno	Documentary
1971	The Knights of Malta	I Cavalieri di Malta	Documentary
1972	We'll Call Him Andrea	Lo chiameremo Andrea	
1973	A Brief Vacation	Una breve vacanza	
1974	The Voyage	Il viaggio	

=== Acting credits ===
- The Clemenceau Affair (1917, by Alfredo De Antoni) as Pierre Clémenceau bambino
- Beauty of the World (1927, by Mario Almirante)
- Company and the Crazy (1928, by Mario Almirante) as Prof. Rosolillo
- The Old Lady (1932, by Amleto Palermi) as Il fine dicitore
- What Scoundrels Men Are! (1932, by Mario Camerini) as Bruno
- Two Happy Hearts (1932, by Baldassarre Negroni) as Mister Brown
- Paprika (1933, by Carl Boese)
- Pasa el amor (1933, by Adolf Trotz)
- The Lucky Diamond (1934, by Carl Boese) as Fritz Peters
- The Song of the Sun (1934, by Max Neufeld (he also stars in the German version titled Das lied der sonne) as Dr. Giuseppe Paladino
- Bad Subject (1933, by Carlo Ludovico Bragaglia) as Willy
- Everybody's Secretary (1933, by Amleto Palermi) as Un gagà
- Full Speed (1934, by Mario Mattoli) as Il professore Giacomo Banti
- Mr. Desire (1934, by Gennaro Righelli) as Martino
- The Song of the Sun (1934, by Max Neufeld) as Paladino, il avvocato
- I'll Give a Million (1935, by Mario Camerini) as Gold
- I Love You Only (1936, by Mario Mattoli) as Prof. Giovanni Agano
- I Don't Know You Anymore (1936, by Nunzio Malasomma) as Il dottore Alberto Spinelli
- Lohengrin (1936, by Nunzio Malasomma) as Alfredo
- The Man Who Smiles (1937, by Mario Mattoli) as Pio Fardella
- Il signor Max (1937, by Mario Camerini) as Gianni / Max Varaldo
- But It's Nothing Serious (1937, by Mario Camerini) as Memmo Speranza
- Naples of Olden Times (1938, by Amleto Palermi) as Mario Esposito
- La mazurka di papà (1938, by Oreste Biancoli) as Stefano San Mauro / Il figlio di San Mauro
- Triumph of Love (1938, by Mario Mattoli) as Vincenzo
- The Cuckoo Clock (1938, by Camillo Mastrocinque) as Il capitano Ducci
- Departure (1938, by Amleto Palermi) as Paolo Veronda
- They've Kidnapped a Man (1938, by Gennaro Righelli) as L'attore cinematografico
- At Your Orders, Madame (1939, by Mario Mattoli) as Pietro Haguet
- Naples That Never Die (1939, by Amleto Palermi)
- These Children (1939, by Mario Mattoli) as Vincenzo
- Castles in the Air (1939, by Augusto Genina (He stars too the German version Ins blaue leben)) as Riccardo Pietramola
- Department Store (1939, by Mario Camerini) as Bruno Zacchi
- It Always Ends That Way (1939, by Enrique Telémaco Susini) as Alberto Miller
- Manon Lescaut (1940, by Carmine Gallone) as Renato Des Grieux
- Two on a Vacation (1940, by Carlo Ludovico Bragaglia) as Il conte Corrado Valli
- Red Roses (1940, by Giuseppe Amato and Vittorio De Sica) as Alberto Verani
- The Two Mothers (1940, by Amleto Palermi) as Salvatore
- The Sinner (1940, by Amleto Palermi) as Pietro Bandelli
- Maddalena, Zero for Conduct (1940, by Vittorio De Sica) as Alfredo Hartman
- The Adventuress from the Floor Above (1941, by Raffaello Matarazzo (script too, not credited)) as Fabrizio Marchini
- Teresa Venerdì (1941, by Vittorio De Sica) as Dott. Pietro Vignali
- Se io fossi onesto (1942, by Carlo Ludovico Bragaglia (script too)) as Pietro Kovach
- A Garibaldian in the Convent (1942, by Vittorio De Sica) as Nino Bixio (uncredited)
- La guardia del corpo (1942, by Carlo Ludovico Bragaglia (script too)) as Riccardo, L'investigatore privato
- Non sono superstizioso... ma! (1943, by Carlo Ludovico Bragaglia (script too)) as Il barone Roberto
- I nostri sogni (1943, by Vittorio Cottafavi (script too)) as Leo
- No Turning Back (1945, by Alessandro Blasetti) as Maurizio
- L'ippocampo (1945, by Gian Paolo Rosmino (script too, and assistant to director, not credited)) as Pio Sandi
- Vivere ancora (1945, by Nino Giannini)
- My Widow and I (1945, by Carlo Ludovico Bragaglia) as Adriano Lari
- Rome, Free City (1946, by Marcello Pagliero) as Il signore distinto
- Peddlin' in Society (1946, by Gennaro Righelli (story and script too)) as Il conte Ghirani
- Christmas at Camp 119 (1947, regia di Pietro Francisci (script too and supervision director, not credited)) as Don Vicenzino
- Lost in the Dark (1947, by Camillo Mastrocinque) as Nunzio
- Unknown Man of San Marino (1948, by Michal Waszynski and Vittorio Cottafavi) as Leo, l'ateo
- Heart and Soul (1948, by Duilio Coletti (producer and script too)) as Professor Perboni
- Il mondo vuole così (1949, by Giorgio Bianchi) as Paolo Morelli
- Tomorrow Is Too Late (1949, by Léonide Moguy (consulting director too, not credited)) as Il professor Landi
- Cameriera bella presenza offresi... (1951, by Giorgio Pàstina) as Leonardo Leonardi
- Mamma Mia, What an Impression! (1951, by Roberto Savarese)
- Hello Elephant (1952, by Gianni Franciolini (producer too)) as Carlo Caretti
- Gli uomini non guardano il cielo (1952, by Umberto Scarpelli)
- In Olden Days (1952, by Alessandro Blasetti) as L'Avvocato Difensore (segment "Il processo di Frine")
- The Earrings of Madame de... (1953, by Max Ophüls) as Baron Fabrizio Donati
- It Happened in the Park (1953, by Gianni Franciolini) as L'avvocato Arturo Cavazzuti (segment: Incidente a Villa Borghese)
- Bread, Love and Dreams (1953, by Luigi Comencini) as Maresciallo Carotenuto
- Marriage (1954, by Antonio Petrucci) as Gregory Stefanovich Smirnov
- 100 Years of Love (1954, by Lionello De Felice) as Duke Giovanni del Bagno aka Signor Pallini (segment "Pendolin")
- Gran Varietà (1954, by Domenico Paolella) as Veneziani - il fine dicitore (segment "Il censore")
- A Slice of Life (1954, by Alessandro Blasetti et Paul Paviot) as Il conte Ferdinando (segment "Don Corradino")
- The Bed (1954, by Gianni Franciolini) as Roberto (segment "Divorce, Le")
- Modern Virgin (1954, by Marcello Pagliero) as Antonio Valli
- The Cheerful Squadron (1954, by Paolo Moffa) as Il generale
- Bread, Love and Jealousy (1954, by Luigi Comencini) as Maresciallo Carotenuto
- The Gold of Naples (1954, by Vittorio De Sica) as Il conte Prospero B. (segment "I giocatori") (uncredited)
- Too Bad She's Bad (1954, by Alessandro Blasetti) as Vittorio Stroppiani
- The Sign of Venus (1955, by Dino Risi) as Alessio Spano
- The Last Five Minutes (1955, by Giuseppe Amato) as Carlo Reani
- The Miller's Beautiful Wife (1955, by Mario Camerini) as Don Teofilo - governatore
- Roman Tales (1955, by Gianni Franciolini) as Avvocato Mazzoni Baralla
- Scandal in Sorrento (1955, by Dino Risi) as Comandante Carotenuto
- Lucky to Be a Woman (1955, by Alessandro Blasetti) as Minor Role (uncredited)
- The Bigamist (1956, by Luciano Emmer) as Attorney Principe
- I giorni più belli (1956, by Mario Mattoli)
- Nero's Weekend (1956, by Steno) as Seneca
- Time of Vacation (1956, by Antonio Racioppi) as Aristide Rossi
- The Monte Carlo Story (1956, by Samuel Taylor and Giulio Macchi (director's assistant too)) as Count Dino della Fiaba
- Noi siamo le colonne (1956, by Luigi Filippo D'Amico) as Alfredo Celimontani
- Fathers and Sons (1957, by Mario Monicelli) as Vincenzo Corallo
- I colpevoli (1957, by Turi Vasile) as Giorgio
- Souvenir d'Italie (1957, by Antonio Pietrangeli) as The Count
- Count Max (1957, by Giorgio Bianchi) as Conte Max Orsini Varaldo
- Casinò de Paris (1957, by André Hunebelle) as Alexandre Gordy
- La donna che venne dal mare (1957, by Francesco De Robertis (1957) as Console Bordogin
- Doctor and the Healer (1957, by Mario Monicelli) as Antonio Locoratolo
- A Farewell to Arms (1957, directed by Charles Vidor (Oscar nomination for Best Supporting Actor) as Major Alessandro Rinaldi
- Vacanze a Ischia (1957, by Mario Camerini) as Ingegner Occhipinti
- The Lady Doctor (1957, by Camillo Mastrocinque) as Marchese De Vitti
- Amore e chiacchiere (1958, by Alessandro Blasetti) as Avvocato Bonelli
- Domenica è sempre domenica (1958, by Camillo Mastrocinque) as Comandante Castaldi
- Anna of Brooklyn (1958, by Carlo Lastricati and Vittorio De Sica) as Don Luigi
- Pezzo, capopezzo e capitano (1958, by Wolfgang Staudte) as Il comandante Ernesto De Rossi
- Angel in a Taxi (1958, by Antonio Leonviola) as God
- Gli zitelloni (1958, by Giorgio Bianchi) as Il professore
- Bread, Love and Andalusia (1958, by Javier Setó (director's assistant too)) as Maresciallo Carotenuto
- La ragazza di Piazza San Pietro (1958, by Piero Costa) as Armando Conforti
- Venetian Honeymoon (1959, by Alberto Cavalcanti) as Alfredo
- My Wife's Enemy (1959, by Gianni Puccini) as Ottavio Terenzi, padre di Marco
- Men and Noblemen (1959, by Giorgio Bianchi) as Marchese Nicola Peccori Macinelli di Afragola
- Winter Holidays (1959, by Camillo Mastrocinque) as Maurice
- World of Miracles (1959, by Luigi Capuano) as Director Pietro Giordani
- The Moralist (1959, by Giorgio Bianchi) as The O. I. M. P. President
- General Della Rovere (1959, by Roberto Rossellini) as Bardone AKA 'Grimaldi'
- Ferdinando I, re di Napoli (1959, by Gianni Franciolini) as Salvatore Caputo
- Nel blu dipinto di blu (1959, by Piero Tellini) as Spartaco
- Policarpo, ufficiale di scrittura (1959, by Mario Soldati)
- Gastone (1960, by Mario Bonnard) as The prince
- The Angel Wore Red (1960, by Nunnally Johnson) as Gen. Clave
- Austerlitz (1960, by Abel Gance) as Pope Pius VII
- It Started in Naples (1960, by Melville Shavelson) as Mario Vitale
- Le tre eccetera del colonnello (1960, by Claude Boissol) as Colonel Belalcazar
- Le pillole di Ercole (1960, by Luciano Salce) as Piero Cuocolo
- The Millionairess (1960, by Anthony Asquith) as Joe
- The Traffic Policeman (1960, by Luigi Zampa) as Il sindaco
- Love in Rome (1960, by Dino Risi) as Director
- The Orderly (1961, by Giorgio Bianchi) as Attore di Fumetti
- L'onorata società (1961, by Riccardo Pazzaglia) as Salvatore, the 'Capintesta'
- Vive Henri IV, vive l'amour (1961, by Claude Autant-Lara) as L'ambassadeur d'Espagne
- The Last Judgment (1961, director) as Defense lawyer
- The Wonders of Aladdin (1961, by Mario Bava and Henry Levin) as Genie
- Gli incensurati (1961, by Francesco Giaculli) as Colonnello Filippo Bitossi
- The Two Marshals (1961, by Sergio Corbucci) as Maresciallo Vittorio Cottone
- La Fayette (1962, by Jean Dréville) as Bancroft
- Eva (1962, by Joseph Losey and Guidarino Guidi) (uncredited)
- The Amorous Adventures of Moll Flanders (1965, by Terence Young) as The Count
- Me, Me, Me... and the Others (1966, by Alessandro Blasetti) as Commendator Trepossi
- An Italian in America (1967, by Alberto Sordi) as Giuseppe's Father
- After the Fox (1966, director) as Himself (uncredited)
- Gli altri, gli altri e noi (1967, by Maurizio Arena)
- The Biggest Bundle of Them All (1968, by Ken Annakin) as Cesare Celli
- Darling Caroline (1968, by Denys de la Patellière) as Le comte de Bièvre - le père de Caroline
- The Shoes of the Fisherman (1968, by Michael Anderson) as Cardinal Rinaldi
- If It's Tuesday, This Must Be Belgium (1969, by Mel Stuart) as Shoemaker
- The Thirteen Chairs (1969, by Nicolas Gessner and Luciano Lucignani) as Carlo De Seta - The Commendatore
- Gang War (1970, by Steno) as Don Michele
- Io non-vedo, tu non-parli, lui non-sente (1971, by Mario Camerini) as Player in Venice casino
- Trastevere (1971, by Fausto Tozzi) as Enrico Formichi
- We Are All in Temporary Liberty (1972, by Manlio Scarpelli) as Giuseppe Mancini 'Pulcinella'
- Hector the Mighty (1972, by Enzo G. Castellari) as Giove
- Snow Job (1972, by George Englund) as Enrico Dolphi
- L'odeur des fauves (1972, by Richard Balducci) as Milord
- The Adventures of Pinocchio (1972, by Luigi Comencini (both Film and TV versions)) as Il giudice
- The Small Miracle (1973, TV Movie, by Jeannot Szwarc) as Father Damico
- Storia de fratelli e de cortelli (1973, by Mario Amendola) as Maresciallo Cenciarelli
- The Assassination of Matteotti (1973, by Florestano Vancini) as Mauro Del Giudice
- Viaggia, ragazza, viaggia, hai la musica nelle vene (1973, by Pasquale Squitieri)
- Blood for Dracula (1974, by Paul Morrissey and Antonio Margheriti) as Il Marchese Di Fiore
- We All Loved Each Other So Much (1974, by Ettore Scola) as Himself
- Intorno (1974, Short film, by Manuel De Sica)
- L'eroe (1976, TV Movie, by Manuel De Sica) (final film role)

Note: on many sources, Fontana di Trevi by Carlo Campogalliani (1960) and La bonne soupe by Robert Thomas (1964) are included but de Sica does not appear in those films.

=== Television appearances as actor ===
- The Four Just Men, by Sapphire Films (1959) (10 of the 39 episodes made)
