= A Breath of Scandal =

1960 film

- Theatrical release poster
- Directed by: Michael Curtiz; Vittorio De Sica (uncredited)
- Screenplay by: Walter Bernstein
- Based on: Olympia by Ferenc Molnár
- Produced by: Carlo Ponti; Marcello Girosi
- Starring: Sophia Loren; Maurice Chevalier; John Gavin; Angela Lansbury; Milly Vitale; Roberto Risso; Isabel Jeans; Tullio Carminati
- Cinematography: Mario Montuori
- Edited by: Howard A. Smith
- Music by: Alessandro Cicognini; Robert Stolz
- Distributed by: Paramount Pictures
- Release dates: March 16, 1960 (Italy); December 16, 1960 (United States)
- Running time: 97 minutes
- Countries: United States; Italy
- Languages: English; Italian

A Breath of Scandal (released as Olympia in Italy) is a 1960 American/Italian international co-production romantic comedy-drama film directed by Michael Curtiz, based on the stage play Olympia by Ferenc Molnár. It stars Sophia Loren, Maurice Chevalier, and John Gavin, with Angela Lansbury, Milly Vitale, Roberto Risso, Isabel Jeans and Tullio Carminati. The film is set at the turn of the 20th century and features lush Technicolor photography of Vienna and the countryside of Austria. The costumes and lighting were designed by George Hoyningen-Huene. Loren disagreed with Curtiz's direction, so director Vittorio De Sica was hired to reshoot certain scenes with Loren after hours without Curtiz's knowledge.

Molnár's 1928 play was also the basis of the 1929 MGM film His Glorious Night.

== Plot ==
In 1907, the widowed Princess Olympia of the Austro-Hungarian Empire has been banished from the imperial court to her late husband's country estate. The bored princess spends her time improving her rifle marksmanship by using flowers, statues and the postman as her targets. When she tires of that, as an expert equestrian as well as an expert markswoman, she rides a wild stallion to her hunting lodge. On the way, she is thrown from her mount by the appearance of an automobile driven by American mining engineer Charlie Foster. Intrigued with Charlie, Olympia feigns injury and keeps her royal heritage a secret from him, for Charlie believes her to be a peasant. Treating her with first aid, Charlie lends her his own pajamas but mistakenly gives her a sleeping pill with a glass of wine that sends Olympia into a deep sleep.

Waking in Charlie's pajama top, but not the bottom, Olympia fears the worst has happened and flees home, where news has arrived that she is able to return to the imperial court in Vienna and is to be married to Prince Ruprecht of Prussia. She is reunited with Charlie, who has come to visit her father about mining and refining bauxite in the empire. Her rival Countess Lina is determined to ruin Olympia's life by informing the imperial chamberlain Count Sandor of Olympia's scandalous conduct with the American.

== Cast ==
- Sophia Loren as Princess Olympia
- Maurice Chevalier as Prince Philip
- John Gavin as Charlie Foster
- Angela Lansbury as Countess Lina
- Isabel Jeans as Princess Eugénie
- Tullio Carminati as Albert
- Milly Vitale as can-can girl
- Carlo Hinterman as Prince Ruprecht
- Roberto Risso as Aide-de-camp
- Friedrich von Ledebur as Count Sandor
- Adrienne Gessner as Amelia

== Production ==
The film was one of three that Loren was obligated to make under her contract with Paramount. It was a coproduction between Paramount and producers Carlo Ponti and Marcello Girosi. Filming began on June 1, 1959, in Vienna.

== Reception ==
In a contemporary review for The New York Times, critic Bosley Crowther called A Breath of Scandal "an utterly foolish lot of nothing" and wrote:

The most scandalous thing about "A Breath of Scandal" ... is the fortune squandered in it upon a slip of an idea. Thousands of dollars worth of costumes, buckets of pseudo-Habsburg jewels, indoor and outdoor settings at some of Vienna's most regal palaces and a cast headed up by Sophia Loren, John Gavin and Maurice Chevalier are tossed away on a skinny fable. ... And to think that so much scenery and costumes, in color, was spent on so much absolute twaddle. Well, as they say in the picture, the Emperor shall hear of this!

== See also ==
- List of American films of 1960
