= Toto, Peppino and the Outlaws =

- Directed by: Camillo Mastrocinque
- Written by: Ruggero Maccari; Vittorio Metz; Mario Amendola
- Starring: Totò; Peppino De Filippo; Franco Interlenghi; Dorian Gray; Maria Pia Casilio; Memmo Carotenuto
- Cinematography: Mario Albertelli
- Edited by: Gisa Radicchi Levi
- Music by: Alessandro Cicognini
- Production company: D.D.L.
- Distributed by: D.D.L. (Italy); Multicom Entertainment Group (International)
- Release date: 1956
- Running time: 98 min
- Country: Italy
- Language: Italian

Toto, Peppino and the Outlaws (Italian: Totò, Peppino e i fuorilegge) is a 1956 Italian comedy film directed by Camillo Mastrocinque.

For this film Peppino De Filippo was awarded with a Silver Ribbon for best supporting actor.

== Plot ==
Antonio and Peppino live in a small town in central Italy: Peppino is the barber, Totò is maintained by the rich but avaricious wife Teresa, who does not allow him in any way to have fun, as Antonio would like. One day Antonio and Peppino take advantage of the fact that the bandit "Il Torchio" has returned to terrorizing the country, pretending to be kidnapped by the band. The two astutely send a message with threats to Teresa, asking for money for the payment of the ransom, with which they go to spend a night of joy. Teresa, however, learns the truth and is furious, and does not believe the stories of Antonio, even when he is really kidnapped by the "Torchio".

== Cast ==
- Totò: Antonio
- Peppino De Filippo: Peppino
- Titina De Filippo: Teresa
- Dorian Gray: Valeria
- Franco Interlenghi: Alberto
- Maria Pia Casilio: Rosina
- Barbara Shelley: la baronessa
- Teddy Reno: himself
- Memmo Carotenuto: Ignazio detto "il Torchio"
- Mario Castellani: il braccio destro del Torchio
