= Angels of Darkness =

1954 film

- Directed by: Giuseppe Amato
- Written by: Bruno Paolinelli (novel); Elio Petri; Gianni Puccini; Cesare Zavattini; Siro Angeli; Giuseppe De Santis; Gigliola Falluto; Giuseppe Mangione; Giuseppe Amato
- Produced by: Giuseppe Amato; Tino Buazzelli; Piero Cocco
- Starring: Linda Darnell; Anthony Quinn; Valentina Cortese
- Cinematography: Anchise Brizzi
- Edited by: Gabriele Varriale
- Music by: Renzo Rossellini
- Production company: Amato Film
- Distributed by: CEI Incom
- Release date: 27 January 1954
- Running time: 94 minutes
- Country: Italy
- Languages: Italian; English

Angels of Darkness (Italian: Donne proibite) is a 1954 Italian melodrama film directed by Giuseppe Amato and starring Linda Darnell, Anthony Quinn and Valentina Cortese.

The film's sets were designed by the art director Virgilio Marchi.

== Plot ==
A brothel is suddenly closed as a prostitute, Tamara, attempts suicide by throwing herself out of the window; she is admitted to the hospital in serious condition. Three of her colleagues, Vally, Franca and Lola, are forced to ask for hospitality from Rosa, who has long since abandoned the profession and now has a nice apartment. Vally wants to change her life and meets Francesco from Abruzzo. They decide to get married, but since the man has to emigrate, they resort to a marriage by proxy. When the young man discovers his troubled past about him, he reproaches it; the woman escapes from despair and goes to meet a tragic death. Tamara, physically damaged, after her hospitalization, has a mystical crisis and will be welcomed in an institute of nuns; Franca, who already has a daughter, finds a job and welcomes her into her new home. Lola, on the other hand, under the armor of unscrupulousness actually has a sensitive and generous soul. She decides to return to her elderly parents, but discovers that her sister is now close to marriage: to avoid a scandal she decides to give up and resigns herself to returning to the city, to the brothel which has reopened its doors in the meantime; but she realizes that she is seriously ill.

== Cast ==
- Linda Darnell as Lola Baldi
- Anthony Quinn as Francesco Caserto
- Valentina Cortese as Vally
- Lea Padovani as Franca
- Giulietta Masina as Rosita
- Lilla Brignone as Tamara
- Carlo Dapporto as Vittorio
- Alberto Farnese as The Sportsman
- Alberto Talegalli as A relative of Francesco's
- Checco Durante as Another relative of Francesco's
- Roberto Risso as Bruno
- Lola Braccini as Signora Capello
- Maria Pia Casilio as The Young Girl
- Rossella Falk as Morena
- Tino Buazzelli as mayor of Stefano
- Aldo Silvani as senior doctor
- Anita Durante as wife of Amilcare
- Gina Amendola
- Mariolina Bovo as Gelsomina
- Anna Maria Bottini as Tamara's friend
- Miranda Campa as woman with red carnation
- Antonio Cifariello as Dr. Carlo
- Edoardo Toniolo as third doctor
- Pina Piovani
- Maria Zanoli as elderly patient
- Alberto Plebani
- Antonio Cifariello
- Margherita Bagni as mother of Bruno
- Memmo Carotenuto as baker
- Cristina Fantoni
- Rina Dei
- Mino Doro
- Luigi Pigliacelli
- Patrizia Remiddi as Bambola

== Bibliography ==
- Gino Moliterno. The A to Z of Italian Cinema. Scarecrow Press, 2009.
