= The Rival (film) =

1955 film

- Film poster
- Directed by: Anton Giulio Majano
- Cinematography: Carlo Carlini
- Music by: Alessandro Cicognini
- Release date: 15 December 1955 (Italy)
- Countries: Italy; France
- Language: Italian

The Rival (Italian: La rivale) is a 1955 Italian-French melodrama film directed by Anton Giulio Majano.

== Cast ==
- Anna Maria Ferrero: Barbara
- Gérard Landry: Roberto
- Maria Mauban: Agnese
- Luisa Rivelli: Fides
- Roberto Risso: Ugo Perelli
- Nerio Bernardi: Prefect Candi
- Aldo Bufi Landi: Corporal Ruffo
- Laura Nucci: Miss Cardi
- Nino Vingelli: Piedigrotta
- Gastone Moschin: Marco
- Franca Dominici: Fides' Mother
- Antonio Battistella: Gerardo
- Arturo Bragaglia: Giuseppe
- Ivo Garrani: Official
- Cesare Fantoni
