= Maria Pia Casilio =

Italian actress (1935–2012)

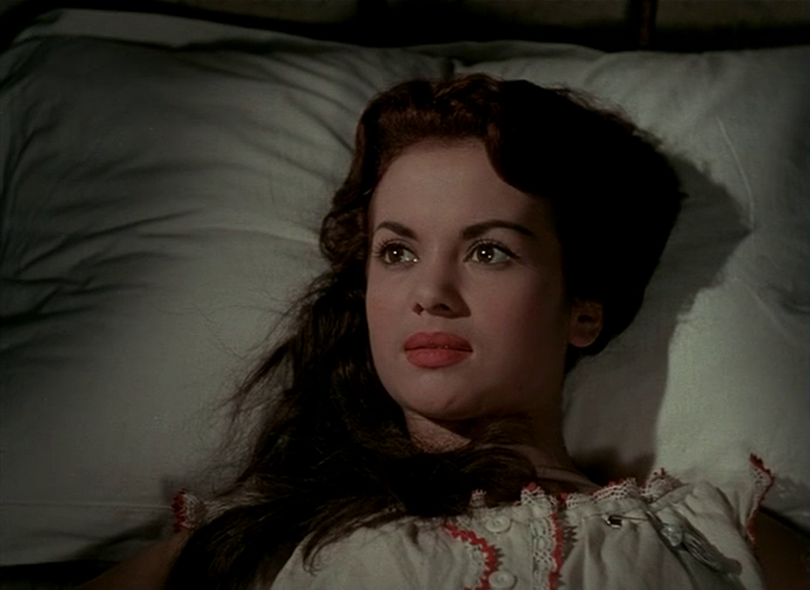
- Casilio in Mid-Century Loves (1954)
- Born: 5 May 1935; L'Aquila, Italy
- Died: 10 April 2012 (aged 76); Rome, Italy
- Occupation: Actress
- Years active: 1952–1997
- Spouse: Giuseppe Rinaldi (died 2007)
- Children: Francesca Rinaldi

Maria Pia Casilio (5 May 1935 – 10 April 2012) was an Italian film actress, best known for major roles in Umberto D. and An American in Rome.

Born in San Pio delle Camere, L'Aquila, Casilio was quite active between 1952 and 1960, usually filling roles as a querulous and naive small-town girl. After her marriage with voice actor Giuseppe Rinaldi, she semi-retired from acting. On the Criterion Collection DVD release of Umberto D., Vittorio De Sica comments she was a lucky charm to have her in his films.

== Partial filmography ==
- Umberto D. (1952) - Maria
- Half a Century of Song (1952)
- Siamo tutti inquilini (1953) - Una cameriera
- Terminal Station (1953) - Young bride from Abruzzo (uncredited)
- Il viale della speranza (1953) - Concettine
- Therese Raquin (1953) - Georgette, la bonne
- La valigia dei sogni (1953) - Mariannina
- Bread, Love and Dreams (1953) - Paoletta
- Angels of Darkness (1954) - The Young Girl
- Mid-Century Loves (1954) - Carmela (segment "Guerra 1915-18")
- Neapolitan Carousel (1954) - Nannina
- The Air of Paris (1954) - Maria Pozzi
- Appassionatamente (1954) - Giannina
- The Doctor of the Mad (1954) - Margherita
- Bread, Love and Jealousy (1954) - Paoletta
- An American in Rome (1954) - Elvira
- Dangerous Turning (1954) - Paquita Simoni
- Due soldi di felicità (1954) - Carmela
- An American in Rome (1955) - Anita
- I pappagalli (1955) - Fulvia
- Toto, Peppino and the Outlaws (1956) - Rosina
- Il canto dell'emigrante (1956) - Anna Benetti
- Amarti è il mio destino (1957) - Maria
- Pezzo, capopezzo e capitano (1958) - Maria
- Mogli pericolose (1958) - Elisa
- Gagliardi e pupe (1958) - Rosina
- Arrivederci Firenze (1958) - Patrizia Taylor
- La banda del buco (1960) - Cordelia
- La donna di ghiaccio (1960) - Antonietta, la cuoca
- The Last Judgment (1961) - Waitress
- Cuore matto... matto da legare (1967)
- Lo chiameremo Andrea (1972) - Bruna Parini
- Noi uomini duri (1987) - Ines
- Three Men and a Leg (1997) - Cecconi's wife
