= Tina Pica =

Italian actress (1884–1968)

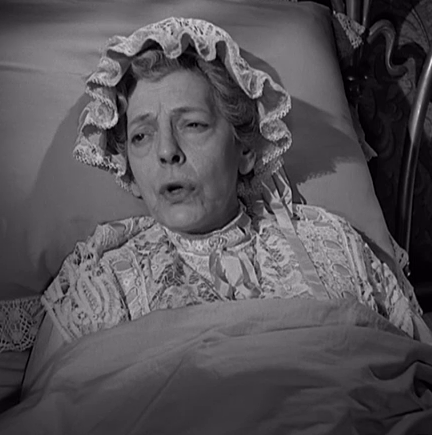
- Pica in the movie Oh! Sabella (1957)
- Born: 7 February 1888; Naples, Kingdom of Italy
- Died: 15 August 1968 (aged 84); Naples, Italy
- Occupation: Actress
- Years active: 1916–1963

Tina Pica (7 February 1888 – 15 August 1968) was an Italian supporting actress who played character roles on stage. Her film debut came in 1935 with The Three-Cornered Hat.

In the 1950s, she became a celebrity thanks to her role as Caramella in the successful film series Bread, Love and Dreams (1953), Bread, Love and Jealousy (1954), Scandal in Sorrento (1955), Bread, Love and Andalusia (1958) and the last one, Pane, amore e così sia (which was never filmed).

In 1955, she won the Nastro d'Argento for Best Supporting Actress.

== Partial filmography ==
- Carmela, la sartina di Montesanto (1916)
- Ciccio, il pizzaiuolo del Carmine (1916)
- The Three-Cornered Hat (1935) as Assunta, a commoner (uncredited)
- Hands Off Me! (1937) as Giulia, the housemaid
- A Lady Did It (1938) as Teresa, the doorkeeper
- The Marquis of Ruvolito (1939) as Miss Mangialardo
- No Man's Land (1939) as Maruzza
- Lost in the Dark (1947)
- Hey Boy (1948) as Maddalena, the cook
- The Vow (1950) as La maligna
- Filumena Marturano (1951) as Rosalia Solimena
- Fiamme sulla laguna (1951)
- Porca miseria (1951) as Donna Rosa
- Destiny (1951) as Nunziata
- Ha da venì... don Calogero (1952)
- Ergastolo (1952) as Mrs. De Giorgi
- The City Stands Trial (1952) as the restaurant owner
- Deceit (1952) as an ill old lady
- Rimorso (1952)
- Husband and Wife (1952) as Rosalia / zia Fedora
- Bread, Love and Dreams (1953) as Caramella
- Naples Sings (1953)
- Siamo ricchi e poveri (1953)
- Melody of Love (1954) as Concetta
- Neapolitan Carousel (1954) as Capera
- Cuore di mamma (1954) as Semmentella
- Bread, Love and Jealousy (1954) as Caramella
- Naples Is Always Naples (1954) as Donna Bettina
- The Gold of Naples (1954) as an old lady (segment "Il professore")
- Due soldi di felicità (1954) as aunt Rachele
- Le signorine dello 04 (1955) as aunt Vittoria
- Graziella (1955) as grandma Assunta
- Toto and Carolina (1955) as the lady at the hospital (uncredited)
- The Sign of Venus (1955) as aunt Tina
- Buonanotte... avvocato! (1955) as Antonia
- A Hero of Our Times (1955) as Clotilde
- La moglie è uguale per tutti (1955) as Beretta's wife
- Io piaccio (1955) as Sibilla
- Destination Piovarolo (1955) as Beppa
- Scandal in Sorrento (1955) as Caramella
- Un po' di cielo (1955) as Antonietta
- Da qui all'eredità (1955) as aunt Tina
- Tragic Ballad (1955) as the boatswain's wife
- Ci sposeremo a Capri (1956) as Donna Concetta Spestacano
- The Virtuous Bigamist (1956) as aunt Camilla
- Guaglione (1956) as Tina
- Amaramente (1956)
- Arriva la zia d'America (1956) as Tecla Camarano
- La nonna Sabella (1957) as grandma Sabella
- Count Max (1957) as the aunt
- Una pelliccia di visone (1957) as grandma Matilde
- Lazzarella (1957) as Mrs. Capuano
- La zia d'America va a sciare (1957) as Tecla Cammarano
- Napoli, sole mio! (1958) as Teresa
- Io, mammeta e tu (1958) as the grandmother
- Il bacio del sole (Don Vesuvio) (1958)
- Non sono più Guaglione (1958) as Nini Bijou
- Mia nonna poliziotto (1958) as Tina De Cupis
- Fantasmi e ladri (1959) as Annunziata
- Non perdiamo la testa (1959) as Mrs. Cuccar
- La duchessa di Santa Lucia (1959) as aunt Carmela, duchess of Santa Lucia
- La nipote Sabella (1959) as Donna Sabella
- La Pica sul Pacifico (1959) as Adelaide Harold
- La sceriffa (1960) as Carmela Esposito
- Che femmina!! E... che dollari! (1961)
- Yesterday, Today and Tomorrow (1963) as grandma Ferrario (segment "Mara") (final film role)
