= Carlo Battisti =

Italian linguist and actor (1882–1977)

Carlo Battisti (10 October 1882 – 6 March 1977) was an Italian acting coach and actor, famed for his starring role in Vittorio De Sica's Umberto D..

== Biography ==
Battisti was born in Trento, Austria-Hungary in 1882 (nowadays Trento, Trentino-Alto Adige, Italy). He studied linguistics at the University of Vienna and founded, along with Ettore Tolomei, the nationalist journal Archivio per l'Alto Adige in 1906. In the early 1920s he became professor of glottology of the University of Florence. Throughout his life he published numerous books and articles on a wide gamut of linguistic topics, ranging from phonetics to Italian dialectology to toponomastics and Vulgar Latin. In recognition of his accomplishments and expertise, Battisti was elected to the Italian national language academy, Accademia della Crusca, in 1925. A member of the National Fascist Party himself, Battisti maintained always a sympathetic position towards the Italianization program which the Fascism pursued towards the South Tyrolean populations and opposed strongly the return of the German-speaking people, who had to leave their region due to the South Tyrol Option Agreement of 1939, to the Alto Adige after World War II.

Battisti starred in Vittorio De Sica's neorealist film Umberto D., his first and last as an actor. It was filmed in 1951 and released in 1952. In 1955 he directed the documentary Nozze fassane.

Battisti died in 1977 in Empoli.
