= Tuppe tuppe, Marescià! =

- Directed by: Carlo Ludovico Bragaglia
- Written by: Ettore Margadonna; Luciana Corda
- Starring: Peppino De Filippo; Giovanna Ralli
- Cinematography: Raffaele Masciocchi
- Edited by: Mario Serandrei
- Music by: Carlo Savina
- Release date: 1958
- Language: Italian

Tuppe tuppe, Marescià! (nap. approx. 'Knock, knock Sarge'), also known as È permesso Maresciallo? ('May I, Sergeant/Marshal?'), is a 1958 Italian comedy film directed by Carlo Ludovico Bragaglia and starring Peppino De Filippo and Giovanna Ralli.

== Plot ==
Sagliena, a (fictitious) village in Abruzzo: Pietro Stelluti as a newly promoted maresciallo (lit. marshal, i.e. warrant officer) of the Carabinieri greets the photo of his former superior Antonio Carotenuto, now on leave. Meanwhile, his long-time colleague Baiocchi rose to the lower rank of brigadiere (Sergeant) and is now under his command. In a dialogue between Stelluti and Baiocchi, it is revealed that the love story with the "Bersagliera" ended badly (see Bread, Love and Dreams).

Now the young marshal has fallen in love with Maria, a girl who has a bar in the town square, but her shyness prevents him from declaring himself. Meanwhile, Maria is asked in marriage by Percuoco, a mature upstart who has returned to the village after making a fortune in France. Maria rejects the advances of the latter who then, to force her to surrender, opens another place and hires Carmelina, a busty waitress who attracts all of Maria's old customers to the new bar.

== Cast ==
- Peppino De Filippo as Percuoco
- Giovanna Ralli as Carmelina
- Roberto Risso as Maresciallo Pietro Stelluti
- Lorella De Luca as Maria
- Aroldo Tieri as Angiolino Angelucci
- Vittoria Crispo as Mariannina
- Memmo Carotenuto as Brigadier Baiocchi
- Maria Paris as Ninetta
- Nino Vingelli as Novità
- Arturo Bragaglia as The Major
- Aldo Bufi Landi as Carabinieri Lieutenant
- Fulvio Pellegrino as Arnaldo
- Jole Fierro as Rosina
- Gildo Bocci as Client at the Bar
- Bruno Corelli as Client at the Bar
- Renato Terra as Client at the Bar
