= La valigia dei sogni =

- Directed by: Luigi Comencini
- Screenplay by: Giuseppe Bennati; Ettore Margadonna
- Produced by: Luigi Comencini
- Cinematography: Václav Vích
- Edited by: Franco Fraticelli
- Music by: Mario Nascimbene
- Release date: 1953
- Running time: 84 minutes
- Country: Italy
- Language: Italian

La valigia dei sogni ("Suitcase of dreams") is a 1953 Italian comedy film directed by Luigi Comencini.

== Cast ==
- Umberto Melnati: Ettore Omeri
- Maria Pia Casilio: Mariannina
- Roberto Risso: Giorgio Astori
- Ludmilla Dudarova: Baronessa Caprioli
- Helena Makowska as herself
- Giulio Calì: Impiegato della Biblioteca Nazionale
- Xenia Valderi: Direttrice del museo
- Giuseppe Chinnici: Commissario
- Nino Vingelli: Detenuto
- Pietro De Vico: Director
