= La Pica sul Pacifico =

La pica sul Pacifico
- Directed by: Roberto Bianchi Montero
- Written by: Roberto Bianchi Montero; Giulio Scarnicci
- Produced by: Ettore Rossi
- Starring: Tina Pica; Elke Sommer; Memmo Carotenuto
- Distributed by: Variety Distribution
- Release date: 1959
- Running time: 90 minutes
- Country: Italy
- Language: Italian

La pica sul Pacifico is a 1959 Italian comedy film written and directed by Roberto Bianchi Montero and starring Tina Pica, Memmo Carotenuto, Elke Sommer and Matteo Spinola.

== Cast ==
- Tina Pica - Adelaide Harold
- Memmo Carotenuto - Jack Carlone
- Elke Sommer - Rossana
- Matteo Spinola - Lorenzo
- Silvio Bagolini - Adone
- Ugo Tognazzi - Roberto De Nobel
