= The Seven Dwarfs to the Rescue =

- Directed by: Paolo W. Tamburella
- Edited by: Giuseppe Vari
- Music by: Alessandro Cicognini
- Release date: 1951
- Country: Italy
- Language: Italian

I sette nani alla riscossa, internationally released as The Seven Dwarfs to the Rescue in 1965, is a 1951 Italian fantasy-comedy film directed by Paolo W. Tamburella.

== Cast ==
- Rossana Podestà: Princess Snow White
- Georges Marchal: The Black Prince
- Roberto Risso: Prince Charming (Biondello)
- Ave Ninchi: The Nanny
- Rossana Martini: The Handmaiden of Darkness
- Guido Celano
- Pietro Tordi
