= Jean Leccia =

French composer and conductor (1938–2023)

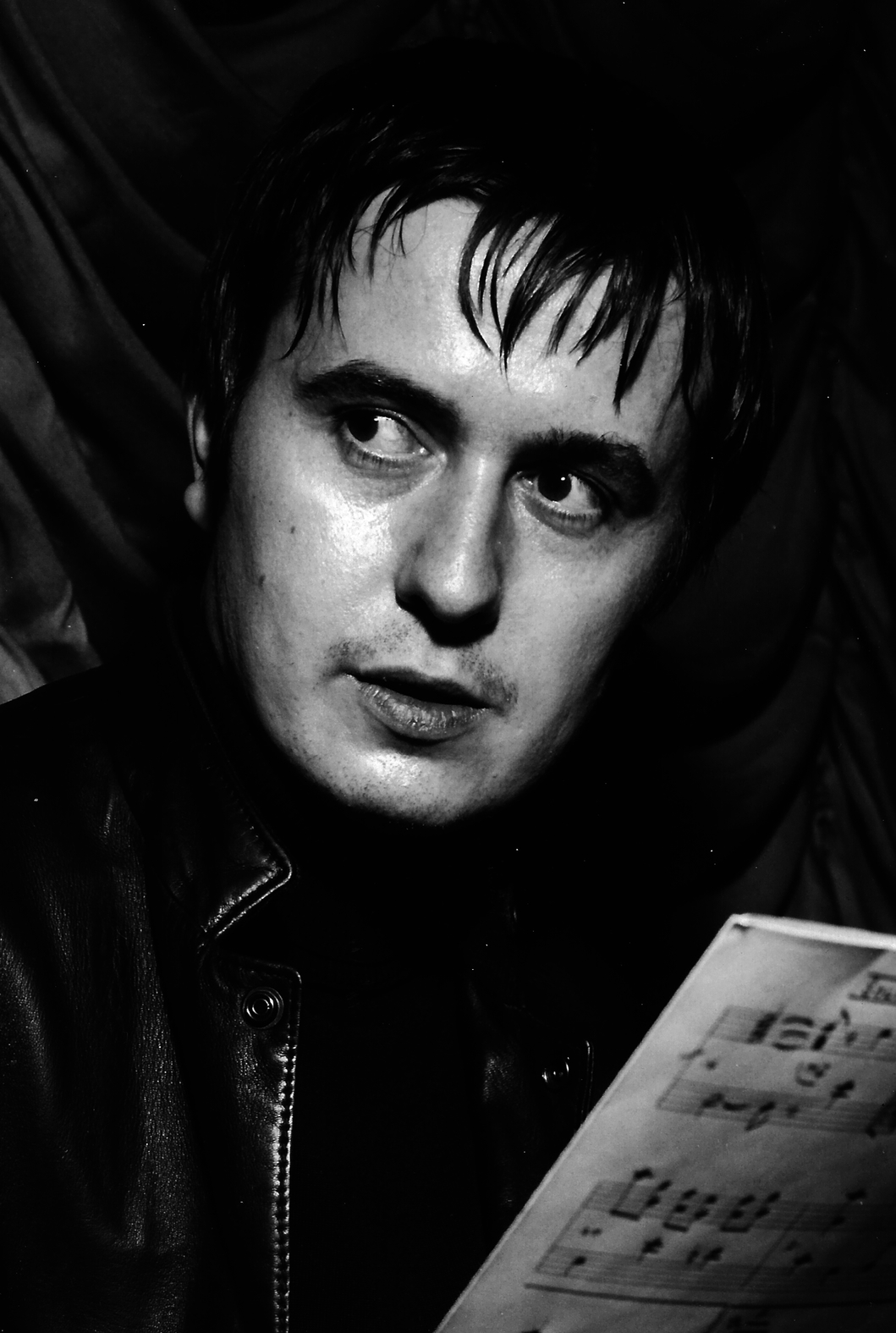
- Leccia in 1978
- Born: Jean Hubert Leccia; 19 February 1938; Lyon, France
- Died: 10 January 2023 (aged 84); Paris, France
- Education: Conservatoire national supérieur de musique et de danse de Lyon
- Occupations: Composer; Conductor

Signature
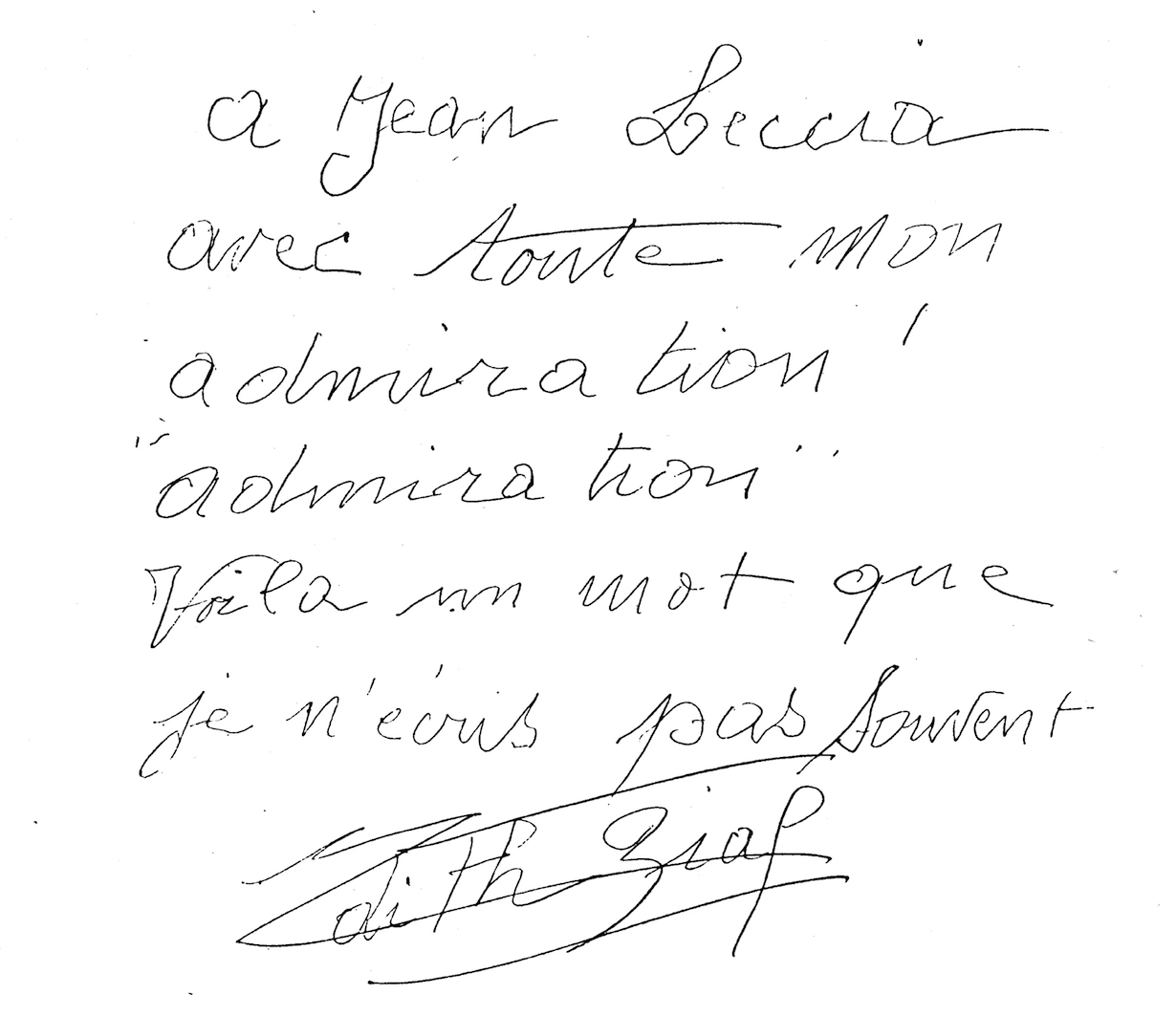

Jean Hubert Leccia (19 February 1938 – 10 January 2023), known in the United States as Jean Lexia, was a French composer, conductor, singer, and pianist.

Leccia was active in various musical genres, such as pop, jazz, ballet, electronic, and classical. He collaborated with many artists, including Charles Aznavour, Édith Piaf, Charles Trenet, and Line Renaud. He was also the composer of several film scores and television series, such as the soap opera Les Saintes Chéries.

== Biography ==
Born in Lyon on 19 February 1938, Leccia was a child prodigy and began studying music at the age of five. When he was nine years-old, he enrolled in the Conservatoire national supérieur de musique et de danse de Lyon, where he studied music theory, piano, accompaniment, harmony, and counterpoint. He began playing in balls and galas to finance his studies.

In 1952, Latin American conductor Benny Bennet gave a concert in Lyon, in which Leccia became the replacement pianist after the original had fallen ill. Although Leccia was only 14, Bennet was highly impressed and invited him to come to Paris after his studies. He came to Paris two years later and became a pianist at the Moulin Rouge. In Paris, he gained notoriety and met Charles Aznavour, who hired him as a pianist. He went on to compose music for the Alhambra-Maurice Chevalier, the Olympia, and the Casino de Paris. In 1957, he met the film director Bernard Borderie, who tasked him with recording music for the film Dishonorable Discharge. He also played for the films The Mask of the Gorilla, La Valse du Gorille, Hit and Run, and La Nuit des traqués.

In 1960, Leccia composed music for the film Cocagne and joined the label Casa Ricordi. Throughout the 1960s, he turned mostly to show music, composing ballet scores for Gilbert Bécaud at the Olympia. In 1966, he co-wrote music for Loulou Gasté at the Casino de Paris show Désirs de Paris alongside Line Renaud. After increasing demand for his music in stage productions, he moved to Las Vegas in 1967, where he lived until 1992. In 1971, he recorded the album Jean Leccia Interpolation in Los Angeles. On the Metro-Goldwyn-Mayer label, his name shows as "Jean Lexia". With this label, he represented the United States at the Tokyo International Film Festival, where he placed third. In 1976, he signed a contract with the Dunes casino as a composer, arranger, and musical director, where he conducted an 18-instrument orchestra described as the best in Las Vegas.

In 1980, Leccia began arranging music and conducting shows for Marlene Ricci at the request of Don Costa, the arranger for Frank Sinatra. In 1985, he ended his collaboration with Dunes and began living between France and the United States. He returned to France for good in 1992 and contributed to the book L'Ouverture metatonale. In 1995, he composed sound illustration for the album Encore Merci. In 2002, he married Aimée Gandois.

Leccia died in Paris on 10 January 2023, at the age of 84.

== Filmography ==
- Dishonorable Discharge (1957)
- The Mask of the Gorilla (1958)
- La Valse du Gorille (1959)
- Hit and Run (1959)
- La Nuit des Traqués (1959)
- Cocagne (1960)
- Réveille toi chérie (1961)
- Tartarin of Tarascon (1962)
- Dyonisos noir (1973)
