= Roberto Risso =

Italian actor (1925–2010)

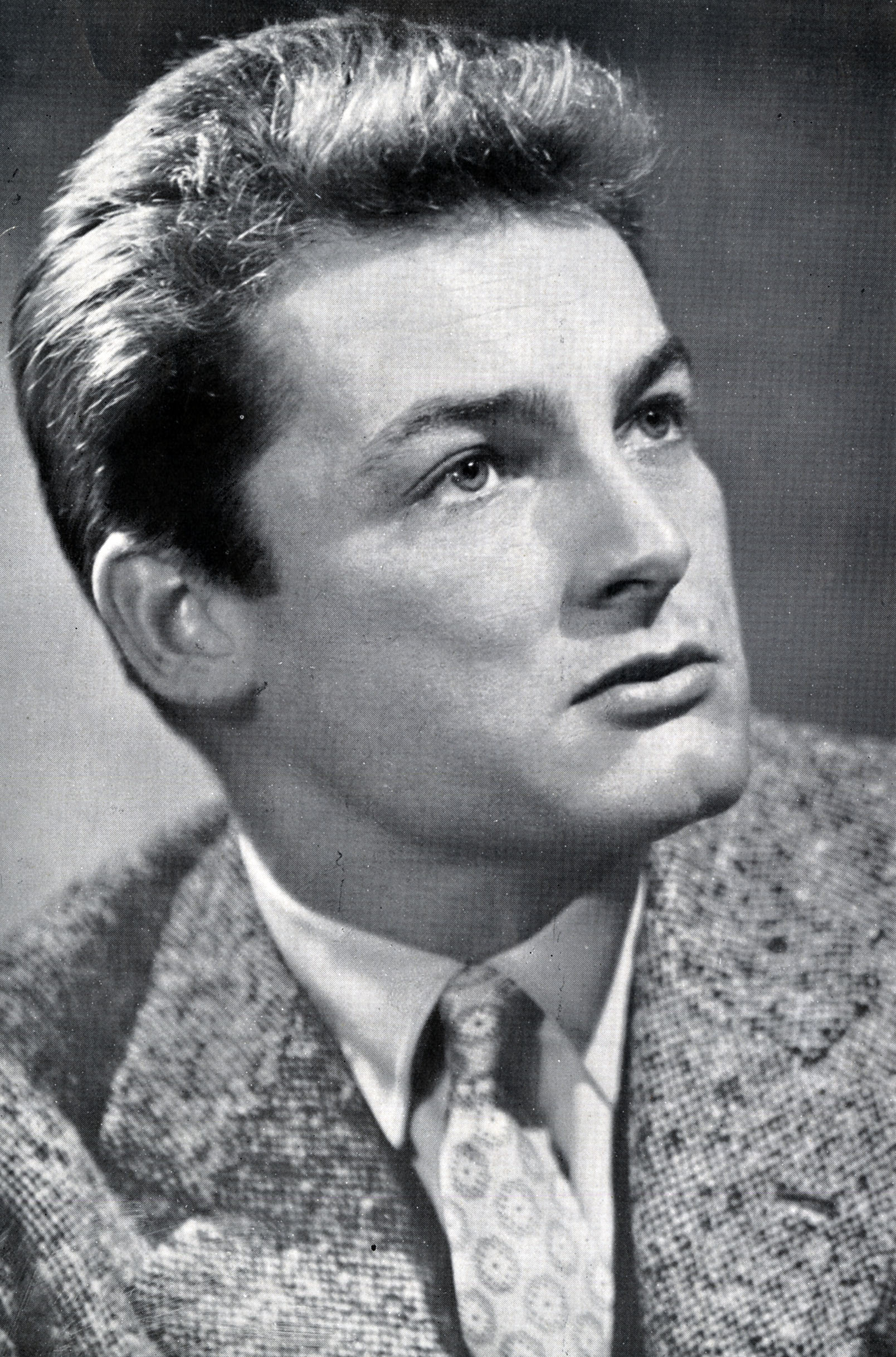
- Born: Pietro Roberto Strub; 22 November 1925; Geneva, Switzerland
- Died: 16 November 2010 (aged 84); Milan, Italy
- Occupation: Actor

Roberto Risso (22 November 1925 – 16 November 2010) was a Swiss-born Italian film actor.

== Life and career ==
Born Pietro Roberto Strub in Geneva, Risso joined the cinema industry when he was still a university student of architecture, playing a minor role in Pietro Francisci's The Lion of Amalfi (1950). One year later he was chosen to play the seducer of Pier Angeli in Tomorrow Is Another Day, and the success of the film allowed him to play similar roles in a large number of films, mainly romantic comedies. In 1953 Risso touched the peak of his career with the role of the shy Carabiniere Pietro Stelluti madly in love with Gina Lollobrigida in Luigi Comencini's Bread, Love and Dreams, a role that he reprised in the film sequel Bread, Love and Jealousy. Later his career continued in many films in which he appeared mostly in character roles, until his retirement in 1968.

== Selected filmography ==
- The Lion of Amalfi (1950)
- Tomorrow Is Another Day (1951) - Paolo
- The Black Captain (1951) - Paolo Adinolfi
- Revenge of the Pirates (1951) - Miguel
- The Seven Dwarfs to the Rescue (1951) - Prince Charming
- Operation Mitra (1951) - Marco Fornari
- La voce del sangue (1952) - Sergio Scala
- Rosalba, la fanciulla di Pompei (1952) - Giorgio de Montera
- Three Forbidden Stories (1952) - Bernardo (First segment)
- Finishing School (1952) - Steve
- La figlia del diavolo (1952) - Roberto
- Nessuno ha tradito (1952) - Bruno
- I Piombi di Venezia (1953) - Il Tintoretto
- Francis the Smuggler (1953) - Davide
- La valigia dei sogni (1953) - Giorgio Astori
- Bread, Love and Dreams (1953) - Carabiniere Stelluti
- Tormento d'anime (1953) - Michele
- Sua altezza ha detto: no! (1953) - Giorgio Rovere
- Il bacio dell'Aurora (1953)
- Balocchi e profumi (1953) - Raimundo Muzzi
- Angels of Darkness (1954) - Bruno
- The Desperate Women (1954) - Jimmy
- Bread, Love and Jealousy (1954) - Carabiniere Stelluti
- One Step to Eternity (1954) - Mario Mirador, l'amant de Véra
- Le signorine dello 04 (1955) - Carlo Conti
- La moglie è uguale per tutti (1955) - Michele
- Il campanile d'oro (1955) - Pasquale
- Songs of Italy (1955)
- Accadde di notte (1956)
- Paris, Palace Hotel (1956) - Gérard Necker dit Brugnon
- The Rival (1956) - Tenente Ugo Perelli
- Una pelliccia di visone (1957) - Franco
- Si le roi savait ça (1958) - Pascal
- Adorabili e bugiarde (1958) - Gino Gorni
- Angel in a Taxi (1958) - Filippo
- Tuppe tuppe, Marescià! (1958) - Maresciallo Pietro Stelluti
- Te doy mi vida (1958)
- Sergente d'ispezione (1958) - Bacci
- L'ultima canzone (1958)
- Caterina Sforza, la leonessa di Romagna (1959) - Giovanni de Medici dalle Bande Nere
- Il raccomandato di ferro (1959)
- A Breath of Scandal (1960) - Aide de camp
- Call Girls of Rome (1960) - Carlo Malpighi
- A Qualcuna Piace Calvo (1960) - Renato Salustri
- Cocagne (1961) - Vincente
- Un figlio d'oggi (1961) - Raul
- The Valiant (1962) - Emilio Bianchi
- Gladiator of Rome (1962) - Valerio jr.
- The Fury of Achilles (1962) - Paris
- The Captive City (1962) - Loveday
- Zorro and the Three Musketeers (1963) - Aramis
- The Shortest Day (1963) - Soldato austriaco (uncredited)
- Rocambole (1963)
- Revenge of the Musketeers (1963) - Aramis
- Hate Thy Neighbor (1968) - Duke (final film role)
