= The Window to Luna Park =

1957 film

- Film poster
- Directed by: Luigi Comencini
- Written by: Luigi Comencini; Suso Cecchi d'Amico; Luciano Martino; Luigi Trabaud
- Produced by: Tonino Cervi
- Starring: Giulia Rubini
- Cinematography: Armando Nannuzzi
- Edited by: Nino Baragli
- Music by: Alessandro Cicognini
- Release date: 27 June 1957
- Running time: 90 minutes
- Countries: Italy; France
- Language: Italian

The Window to Luna Park (Italian: La finestra sul Luna Park) is a 1957 Italian drama film directed by Luigi Comencini.

It was entered into the 7th Berlin International Film Festival.

== Cast ==
- Giulia Rubini - Ada, Aldo's wife
- Gastone Renzelli - Aldo
- Pierre Trabaud - Righetto
- Calina Classy - Aida
- Gisella Mancinotti - Antonietta
- Luigi Russo - Spartaco
- Remo Galli - Niccodemo
- Lina Galli - Rosa
- Primo Raschi - Il nonno
- Vittoria Marone - La nonna
- Giancarlo Damiani - Mario, Aldo's son
- Silvana Jachino - The teacher
- Luigi Russo - Spartaco
