= Terminal Station (film) =

1954 film by Vittorio De Sica

- Italian theatrical release poster
- Italian: Stazione Termini
- Directed by: Vittorio De Sica
- Written by: Luigi Chiarini; Giorgio Prosperi; Truman Capote
- Based on: Stazione Termini (short story) by Cesare Zavattini
- Produced by: Vittorio De Sica
- Starring: Jennifer Jones; Montgomery Clift
- Cinematography: G. R. Aldo
- Edited by: Eraldo Da Roma; Jean Barker
- Music by: Alessandro Cicognini
- Production companies: Produzione Film Vittorio De Sica; Produzioni De Sica; Selznick Releasing Organization
- Distributed by: Columbia Pictures (United States); Lux Film (Italy)
- Release dates: April 2, 1953 (Italy); June 25, 1954 (New York)
- Running time: 89 minutes
- Countries: Italy; United States
- Languages: English; Italian

Terminal Station (Italian: Stazione Termini, released in the United States as Indiscretion of an American Wife) is a 1953 romantic drama film directed and produced by Vittorio De Sica and starring Jennifer Jones, Montgomery Clift and Richard Beymer. It tells the story of the love affair between a married American woman and an Italian academic. The title refers to the Roma Termini railway station in Rome, where the film takes place. The film was entered into the 1953 Cannes Film Festival.

Terminal Station was the first Hollywood film by Italian director De Sica, as an international coproduction with American mogul David O. Selznick. The collaboration was fraught with constant and severe creative differences that resulted in two different versions of the film, an 89-minute Italian version and a 72-minute American recut version under the alternate title Indiscretion of an American Wife. After this experience, De Sica never again worked with a Hollywood producer, although he later directed English-language films with American actors.

== Plot ==
The following synopsis reflects the 89-minute Italian version.

Mary Forbes, an American housewife, has fallen in love with an Italian–American man named Giovanni Doria while visiting her sister in Rome. She arrives at his apartment door but decides not to ring the door bell. Mary hitches a ride to the train station, where she schedules a journey from Milan to Paris and telephones her young nephew Paul to bring her luggage. Mary next writes a telegram to Giovanni, expressing her love and pleads for his forgiveness. Mary boards a train compartment but before the train leaves the station, Mary sees Giovanni: he had learned about Mary's departure from her sister after not hearing from her. Their conversation is interrupted by Paul, who has arrived with Mary's luggage. As the train moves away, Mary decides to stay with Giovanni.

Inside the terminal, they talk inside a restaurant where Giovanni reminds Mary she had told him yesterday that she loved him. Mary however felt conflicted as she is married to her husband Howard and has a young daughter, Catherine. Regardless, Giovanni has accepted a teaching job at the University of Pisa and wants to live with Mary and Catherine along the Marina di Pisa. Giovanni invites Mary to his apartment, and as they leave the terminal, she sees Paul. Because of her unexpected reunion with her nephew, Mary expresses doubt about continuing their affair. Angered by Mary's indecision, Giovanni slaps her and leaves the station. Paul witnesses the assault.

While Paul and Mary wait for the next train to Paris, an Italian woman sitting next to them goes into labor. Her husband and Mary help the woman to a first aid station, where she is treated by a doctor. Mary has Paul watch the woman's three children. Inside the first aid station, the woman recovers and her husband thanks Mary.

Meanwhile, Giovanni returns to the station to search for Mary. Paul is suspicious of their relationshp, and Mary instructs him to return home, with a promise to invite him to visit her for Christmas. As Paul leaves the station, Giovanni sees him and asks him where Mary is. Paul refuses to answer Giovanni, who then runs back to the train station. He locates Mary and runs across the tracks, narrowly avoiding being hit by an incoming train, to Mary's dismay.

Mary and Giovanni climb into an empty train compartment where they embrace each other. Moments later, they are arrested by the police for public sex and escorted to a nearby police station. As they wait for the police commissioner, Giovanni confronts an officer about their arrest as Mary will miss her train. An overhead announcer also calls for Mary to reclaim her luggage. When the commissioner arrives, he states their actions will require a trial but instead he drops the charges since Mary is a married woman with a child. Giovanni escorts Mary to the station where she reclaims her luggage. Before the train leaves, they bid their final farewells. As Mary's train leaves, Giovanni exits the terminal.

== Cast ==
- Jennifer Jones as Mary Forbes
- Montgomery Clift as Giovanni Doria
- Richard Beymer as Paul Stevens
- Gino Cervi as the Commissario
- Memmo Carotenuto as Signor Venturini
- Paolo Stoppa as the traveling salesman
- Oscar Blando as the 1st train driver
- Nando Bruno as the 2nd train driver
- Enrico Glori as the Brigadier
- Enrico Viarisio as the post office clerk
- Maria-Pia Casilio as the Abruzzan bride
- Gigi Reder as the Abruzzan groom
- Clelia Matania as the mother with children
- Giuseppe Porelli as Gentleman on Train
- Liliana Gerace as the pregnant Sicilian woman
- Roberto Rai as the brakeman
- Attilio Torelli as the migrant
- Mariolina Bovo as the girl on the train
- Amina Pirani Maggi as the telegram mother
- Charles Fernley Fawcett as the sad man at the post office
- Mimmo Poli as the fat man

== Production ==
The film is based on the story Stazione Termini by Cesare Zavattini. Truman Capote was credited with writing the entire screenplay, but later claimed to have written only two scenes. The film was an international coproduction between De Sica's own company and the Hollywood producer David O. Selznick, who commissioned it as a vehicle for his wife, Jennifer Jones. The production of the film was troubled from the very beginning. Carson McCullers was originally chosen to write the screenplay, but Selznick replaced her with a series of writers, including Paul Gallico, Alberto Moravia and Capote. Disagreements ensued between De Sica and Selznick, and during production, Selznick would write 40- and 50-page letters to De Sica, who could not read English. Montgomery Clift sided with De Sica in his disputes with Selznick, claiming that Selznick wanted the film to look like a slick little love story, while De Sica wanted to depict a ruined romance.

During filming, Jones was distracted and saddened by the recent death of her former husband, actor Robert Walker, and badly missed her two sons, who were at school in Switzerland. She had been married to Selznick less than two years at that point, and they were having difficulties in the marriage.

The movie was the feature debut of Richard Beymer.

The original 1953 Italian release of the film ran for 89 minutes, but it was later reedited by Selznick down to 64 minutes. This was too short to qualify it as a feature film, so Selznick hired singer Patti Page and James Wong Howe filmed her singing the songs "Indiscretion" and "Autumn in Rome" on a soundstage. This unrelated "overture" footage was inserted at the beginning of the film, before the credits, extending its running time to 72 minutes. He also added additional close-ups and insert shots of Jones and Clift, directed by Oswald Morris. Selznick released this version in the United States as Indiscretion of an American Wife (and as Indiscretion in the UK).

== Reception ==
In a contemporary review for The New York Times, critic Bosley Crowther called the film "a tense and troubled drama" and wrote:

Herein it bears a resemblance to another of Signor De Sica's films—"The Bicycle Thief," which likewise pictured a private crisis against the vast backdrop of Rome. But whereas the latter had overtones of real social tragedy, this new film of Signor De Sica implies nothing but a personal mistake. The crisis may be no less painful for the individual person involved, but for the ordinary person who sees it, it has small significance. And this, we're afraid, is the weakness in Signor De Sica's film: the sole contemplation of is [sic] as a lady's—and gentleman's—brief distress over a private indiscretion of which the lady, at least, appears ashamed. For an hour and a half, they thrash the question: shall she go or shall she stay? Shall she cruelly abandon her husband and child back in Philadelphia, or shall she get on the train and highball? It is as open and shut as that.

According to Simone Brioni, De Sica’s film portrays Termini as a site of encounters between different social classes, highlighting diverse histories of mobility in Italy.

Montgomery Clift declared that he hated the picture and denounced it as "a big fat failure."

Filmink argued it "doesn't have enough story for a feature".

== Home media ==
The two versions of the film have been released together on DVD by the Criterion Collection. A 1998 remake of the film was produced for television under the title Indiscretion of an American Wife.

== Accolades ==
- Nomination for the Grand Prix of 1953 International Film Festival in Cannes (Vittorio De Sica).
- Nomination for the 1955 Academy Award for Best Costume Design in black and white (Christian Dior).
