= Nessuno ha tradito =

- Directed by: Roberto Bianchi Montero
- Written by: Carlo De Sanctis; Camillo De Filippis; Fulvio Palmieri
- Cinematography: Giovanni Pucci
- Music by: Carlo Innocenzi
- Distributed by: Showcase Entertainment
- Release date: 1952
- Country: Italy
- Language: Italian

Nessuno ha tradito (also known as Il ponte della concordia, in English formerly known as The Not Gentle War) is a 1952 Italian war melodrama film directed by Roberto Bianchi Montero.

== Cast ==
- Virginia Belmont as Laura
- Aldo Silvani as Colombo
- Roberto Risso as Bruno
- Vincenzo Musolino as Sandro
- Laura Redi as Bruno's Sister
- Leopoldo Valentini as Priest
- Sandro Ruffini
- Renato Chiantoni
- Marco Guglielmi
