= Alessandro Cicognini =

Italian composer

Alessandro Cicognini (15 January 1906 – 9 November 1995) was an Italian composer who is chiefly remembered for his film scores.

== Biography ==
Born in Pescara, Cicognini graduated with a degree in music composition from the Milan Conservatory in 1927 where he was a pupil of Giulio Cesare Paribeni and Renzo Bossi. In 1933 his opera, Donna Lombarda, inspired by a popular folk ballad, premiered at the Teatro Regio in Turin. From then, with the exceptions of Messa a 5 voci and Saul, he focused his activities on composing musical scores for over 100 films, often collaborating with filmmakers Vittorio de Sica and Alessandro Blasetti. Much of his film music makes use of small ensembles and unusual instrumentation, rather than the lush orchestral scores common to film music of the mid-20th century. His style has been described as late-romantic, and was characterized by immediacy and catchiness. In 1965 he retired from film composition and became a teacher; one of his soundtracks, to the 1953 film Terminal Station, was reused in What's Eating Gilbert Grape in 1993.

Cicognini died in Rome on 9 November 1995 at the age of 89.

== Film scores ==
- The Two Sergeants (1936, uncredited)
- The Black Corsair (1937)
- I due misantropi (1937, uncredited)
- Ettore Fieramosca (1938)
- Naples of Olden Times (1938)
- Departure (1938)
- The Two Mothers (1938)
- An Adventure of Salvator Rosa (1939)
- Backstage (1939)
- The Document (1939)
- Cavalleria rusticana (1939)
- A Wife in Danger (1939)
- Department Store (1939)
- Castles in the Air (1939)
- Naples Will Never Die (1939)
- Senza cielo (1940)
- Don Pasquale (1940)
- A Romantic Adventure (1940)
- The Sinner (1940)
- Beyond Love (1940)
- Eternal Melodies (1940)
- The Birth of Salome (1940)
- One Hundred Thousand Dollars (1940)
- First Love (1941)
- The Iron Crown (1941)
- Ridi pagliaccio! (1941)
- Giuliano de' Medici (1941)
- Four Steps in the Clouds (1942)
- Pastor Angelicus (1942)
- Fourth Page (1942)
- The Little Teacher (1942)
- Sad Loves (1943)
- A Living Statue (1943)
- Il nostro prossimo (1943)
- Two Anonymous Letters (1945)
- La resa di Titì (1945)
- No Turning Back (1945)
- Shoeshine (1946)
- La sua strada (1946)
- The Unknown Man of San Marino (1946)
- Il cavaliere del sogno (1947)
- Last Love (1947)
- Il duomo di Milano (1947)
- Crime News (1947)
- Le avventure di Pinocchio (1947)
- Bicycle Thieves (1948)
- The Mysterious Rider (1948)
- The Flame That Will Not Die (1949)
- The Earth Cries Out (1949)
- The Iron Swordsman (1949)
- Ho sognato il Paradiso (1949)
- Paolo e Francesca (1949)
- Flying Squadron (1949)
- Hawk of the Nile (1949)
- Father's Dilemma (1950)
- Cavalcade of Heroes (1950)
- Tomorrow Is Too Late (1950)
- The Thief of Venice (1950)
- Ring Around the Clock (1950)
- Stormbound (1951)
- Cops and Robbers (1951)
- The Seven Dwarfs to the Rescue (1951)
- Cameriera bella presenza offresi... (1951)
- Miracle in Milan (1951)
- The Shameless Sex (1952)
- Two Cents Worth of Hope (1952)
- Little World of Don Camillo (1952)
- Hello Elephant (1952)
- Umberto D. (1952)
- In Olden Days (1952)
- Wife for a Night (1952)
- The Secret of Three Points (1952)
- Bread, Love and Dreams (1953)
- We, the Women (1953)
- The Return of Don Camillo (1953)
- Terminal Station (1953)
- Sunday Heroes (1953)
- Ulysses (1954)
- Too Bad She's Bad (1954)
- The Gold of Naples (1954)
- Bread, Love and Jealousy (1954)
- A Slice of Life (1954)
- Graziella (1954)
- Scandal in Sorrento (1955)
- Don Camillo's Last Round (1955)
- Summertime (1955)
- The Last Five Minutes (1955)
- The Art of Getting Along (1955)
- Are We Men or Corporals? (1955)
- The Roof (1956)
- The Bigamist (1956)
- Lucky to Be a Woman (1956)
- The Band of Honest Men (1956)
- The Window to Luna Park (1956)
- Loser Takes All (1956)
- Time of Vacation (1956)
- Toto, Peppino and the Outlaws (1956)
- Vacanze a Ischia (1957)
- The Black Orchid (1958)
- Anna of Brooklyn (1958)
- È arrivata la parigina (1958)
- Bread, Love and Andalusia (1959)
- A Breath of Scandal (1960)
- It Started in Naples (1960)
- The Last Judgement (1961)
- Don Camillo: Monsignor (1961)
- The Pigeon That Took Rome (1962)
- Don Camillo in Moscow (1965)
