= Le signorine dello 04 =

- Directed by: Gianni Franciolini
- Written by: Sergio Amidei; Age & Scarpelli
- Cinematography: Tonino Delli Colli
- Music by: Carlo Innocenzi
- Release date: 1955
- Country: Italy
- Language: Italian

Le signorine dello 04 (The ladies of the 04) is a 1955 Italian romantic comedy-drama film directed by Gianni Franciolini.

== Cast ==
- Antonella Lualdi: Maria Teresa Landolfi
- Antonio Cifariello: Amleto
- Giovanna Ralli: Bruna
- Roberto Risso: Carlo Conti
- Sergio Raimondi: Fernando
- Franca Valeri: Carla, capoturno
- Peppino De Filippo: Dellisanti
- Marisa Merlini: Vera Colasanti
- Giulia Rubini: Gabriella
- Aldo Giuffrè: Guido Colasanti
- Turi Pandolfini: Cavaliere
- Tina Pica: Zia Vittoria
- Ferruccio Amendola: brother of Bruna
- Enzo Garinei: suitor of Bruna
- Miranda Campa: mother of Carlo Conti
- Maria Zanoli: Clementina
- Nando Bruno: upset user
