= Il viale della speranza =

1953 film

- DVD cover
- Directed by: Dino Risi
- Written by: Franco Cannarosso; Gino De Santis; Ettore Maria Margadonna; Dino Risi
- Starring: Cosetta Greco
- Cinematography: Mario Bava
- Edited by: Eraldo Da Roma
- Music by: Mario Nascimbene
- Release date: 10 April 1953
- Running time: 100 minutes
- Country: Italy
- Language: Italian

Il viale della speranza (English: The street of hope) is a 1953 Italian drama film directed by Dino Risi. It grossed over 100 million lire at the Italian box office.

== Cast ==
- Cosetta Greco as Luisa Guglielmi
- Liliana Bonfatti as Giuditta Robotti
- Piera Simoni as Franca Albani
- Marcello Mastroianni as Mario Montesi
- Pietro De Vico as Tonino
- Nerio Bernardi as Franzi
- Gisella Monaldi as Titina
- Maria Pia Casilio as Concettina
- Achille Majeroni as Acting teacher
- Bianca Maria Fusari as Stefania
- Odoardo Girotti as Giorgio
- Franco Migliacci
- Silvio Bagolini
- Corrado Pani
- Carlo Hintermann
- Alessandro Fersen
- Nino Marchetti
- Giulio Calì
