= Scandal in Sorrento =

1955 film by Dino Risi

- Italian poster
- Directed by: Dino Risi
- Written by: Marcello Girosi; Ettore Margadonna; Dino Risi; Vincenzo Talarico
- Produced by: Marcello Girosi
- Starring: Vittorio De Sica; Sophia Loren; Lea Padovani; Antonio Cifariello; Tina Pica; Mario Carotenuto; Yoka Berretty
- Cinematography: Giuseppe Rotunno
- Edited by: Mario Serandrei
- Music by: Alessandro Cicognini
- Distributed by: Titanus
- Release date: 22 December 1955 (Italy)
- Running time: 106 minutes
- Country: Italy
- Language: Italian

Scandal in Sorrento (Italian: Pane, amore e...) is a 1955 Italian comedy film directed by Dino Risi. This is the third film of the trilogy, formed by Bread, Love and Dreams in 1953, Bread, Love and Jealousy in 1954. Innovations include the use of color rather than black and white, as well the location of Sorrento instead of the small village of the previous films of the series. At the 6th Berlin International Film Festival it won the Honorable Mention (Best Humorous Film) award.

== Plot ==
In this Italian romantic comedy set in the beautiful Bay of Naples, Marshal Antonio Carotenuto arrives back in his home town of Sorrento to take care of the local municipal police. Donna Sofia, an attractive fishmonger, has rented the home from the marshal who wants to reclaim his home. The woman refuses to leave but almost accepts marriage to Antonio almost as a joke to make Nicolino, a fisherman who she is genuinely in love with, jealous. She goes along with the marshal's courting, agrees to dump her fiancé and says she will marry him. When the marshal realizes what she is doing, he breaks up with her and decides to pursue his own landlady instead.

== Cast ==
- Vittorio De Sica as Maresciallo Carotenuto
- Sophia Loren as Donna Sofia, a Smargiassa
- Lea Padovani as Donna Violante Ruotolo
- Antonio Cifariello as Nicola Pascazio, Nicolino
- Tina Pica as Caramella
- Mario Carotenuto as Don Matteo Carotenuto
- Virgilio Riento as Don Emidio

== Reception ==
In line with its predecessors, the film performed very well at the Italian box office, ranking as the fourth highest-grossing film of the 1955–56 film season. At the 1956 David di Donatello Awards, the film won Best Production (Migliore Produzione) for Goffredo Lombardo and Best Actor (Migliore Attore) for Vittorio De Sica.
