= Giulia Rubini =

Italian actress (born 1935)

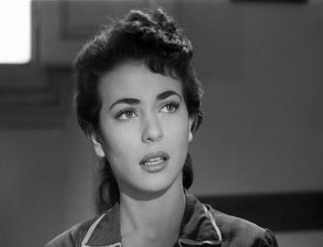
- Giulia Rubini, 1954
- Born: 2 June 1935 (age 90); Pescara, Italy
- Occupation: Actress
- Years active: 1953–1968

Giulia Rubini (born 2 June 1935) is an Italian actress. She appeared in 35 films between 1953 and 1968. She starred in the film The Window to Luna Park.

== Selected filmography ==
- Le ragazze di San Frediano (1954)
- High School (1954)
- The Two Friends (1955)
- Le signorine dello 04 (1955)
- The Virtuous Bigamist (1956)
- The Band of Honest Men (1956)
- The Window to Luna Park (1957)
- El Hakim (1957)
- Beneath the Palms on the Blue Sea (1957)
- Peppino, le modelle e chella là (1957)
- Goliath and the Barbarians (1959)
- The Night They Killed Rasputin (1960)
- David and Goliath (1960)
- The Magnificent Rebel (1961)
- Rage of the Buccaneers (1961)
- La monaca di Monza (1962)
- The Sign of the Coyote (1963)
- Kidnapped to Mystery Island (1964)
- Canadian Wilderness (1965)
- Johnny Oro (1966)
- 7 pistole per un massacro (1967)
- A Stranger in Paso Bravo (1968)
