= Last Love (1947 film) =

- Directed by: Luigi Chiarini
- Written by: Mario Serandrei; Brunello Rondi; Ettore Maria Margadonna; Cesare Ludovici; Rodolfo Gentile; Giuseppe De Santis
- Starring: Clara Calamai; Andrea Checchi; Carlo Ninchi; Dante Maggio
- Cinematography: Otello Martelli
- Edited by: Mario Serandrei
- Music by: Alessandro Cicognini
- Production company: Pan Film
- Distributed by: Variety Distribution
- Release date: 5 April 1947
- Running time: 106 minutes
- Country: Italy
- Language: Italian

Last Love (Italian: Ultimo amore) is a 1947 Italian melodrama film directed by Luigi Chiarini and starring Clara Calamai, Andrea Checchi and Carlo Ninchi. It set during the Second World War with Italy close to defeat and increasingly occupied by German troops. Three Italian soldiers are enjoying some leave when they become involved with an enigmatic female singer!.

== Cast ==
- Clara Calamai as Maria, la canzonetista
- Andrea Checchi as Il capitano Rastelli
- Carlo Ninchi as Il cappelano
- Dante Maggio as Il partner di Maria
- Aroldo Tieri as Il sergente d'aviazione
- Vira Silenti as La sorella del sergente
- Giacomo Rondinella as Il tenente
- Pina Piovani as La madre del tenente
- Ughetto Bertucci
- Cesare Ludovici
- Guido Salvini

== Bibliography ==
- Moliterno, Gino. Historical Dictionary of Italian Cinema. Scarecrow Press, 2008.
