= Graziella (1954 film) =

- Film poster
- Directed by: Giorgio Bianchi
- Written by: Alphonse de Lamartine (novel); Suso Cecchi D'Amico; Sandro Continenza
- Starring: Maria Fiore; Jean-Pierre Mocky
- Cinematography: Mario Bava
- Music by: Alessandro Cicognini
- Production company: Trionfalcine
- Distributed by: Cei-Incom
- Release date: 25 February 1955
- Country: Italy
- Language: Italian

Graziella is a 1954 Italian historical melodrama film directed by Giorgio Bianchi and starring Maria Fiore and Jean-Pierre Mocky. It is the third adaptation of the 1852 novel Graziella by Alphonse de Lamartine.

== Plot ==
In Naples in 1821, Alphonse de Lamartine, a young poet belonging to a noble French family, ventures on a lampara with local fishermen. A storm hits them; luckily they manage to get to the shores of Procida, where the young man is welcomed into the family of Andrea, one of the fishermen. Here he meets Graziella, a young and beautiful girl with whom a good friendship is born immediately, and he wins the sympathy of the whole family by buying back the boat that was destroyed. One evening he reads some passages from the novel Paolo e Virginia. The story particularly strikes Graziella, who already seems to have experienced her fate. The following morning, Alphonse, pressed by the French consul to return to Paris, promises Graziella that he will return soon. During her absence, she Graziella prepares a coral depicting the hermit's hut, a place on the island where they had spent time, to give to Alphonse. She begs Andrea to take him to the French consulate and hand him over to the young man, who has already left. Afflicted by her prolonged absence, Graziella accepts with consternation her engagement to her cousin Cecco. On the eve of the ceremony, the grandparents go to Naples to buy clothes and there they meet Alphonse, who has just arrived, who is returning with the two elders to Procida. Here is the disconcerting news: Graziella has run away from home. Attempts to find it fail until Alphonse sees the coral on which the hut is depicted. He goes to the place and finds her. There they exchange love for each other, promising to spend a happy life together. A new intervention by the consul forces Alphonse to return to his parents again in France, who dissuade him from marrying a girl not of the same social rank and promising him that his poems will be published by a well-known publisher. Graziella, waiting for her made more and more lasting, slowly wears out. No doctor can identify the disease that both mentally and physically afflicts the girl. At the end of her strength, Graziella writes a farewell letter to Alphonse, arguing that "dying can't be worse than living without him". Having received the letter, he hurriedly rushes to Italy. When he arrives in Procida an unusual silence welcomes him, broken only by the touch of the church bells. The angel who is accompanied to heaven by the procession is the beloved Graziella.

== Cast ==
- Maria Fiore as Graziella
- Jean-Pierre Mocky as Alphonse de Lamartine
- Elisa Cegani as Alphonse's mother
- Tina Pica as Grandma Assunta
- Franco Nicotra as Cecco, Graziella's fiancé
- Nino Imparato as Papè
- Francesco Tomalillo as Nonno Andrea
- Nanda Primavera as Donna Concetta
- Eduardo Passarelli as Don Michele
- Enzo Maggio as Servant

== Bibliography ==
- Goble, Alan. The Complete Index to Literary Sources in Film. Walter de Gruyter, 1999.
