= Cesare Zavattini =

Italian screenwriter (1902–1989)

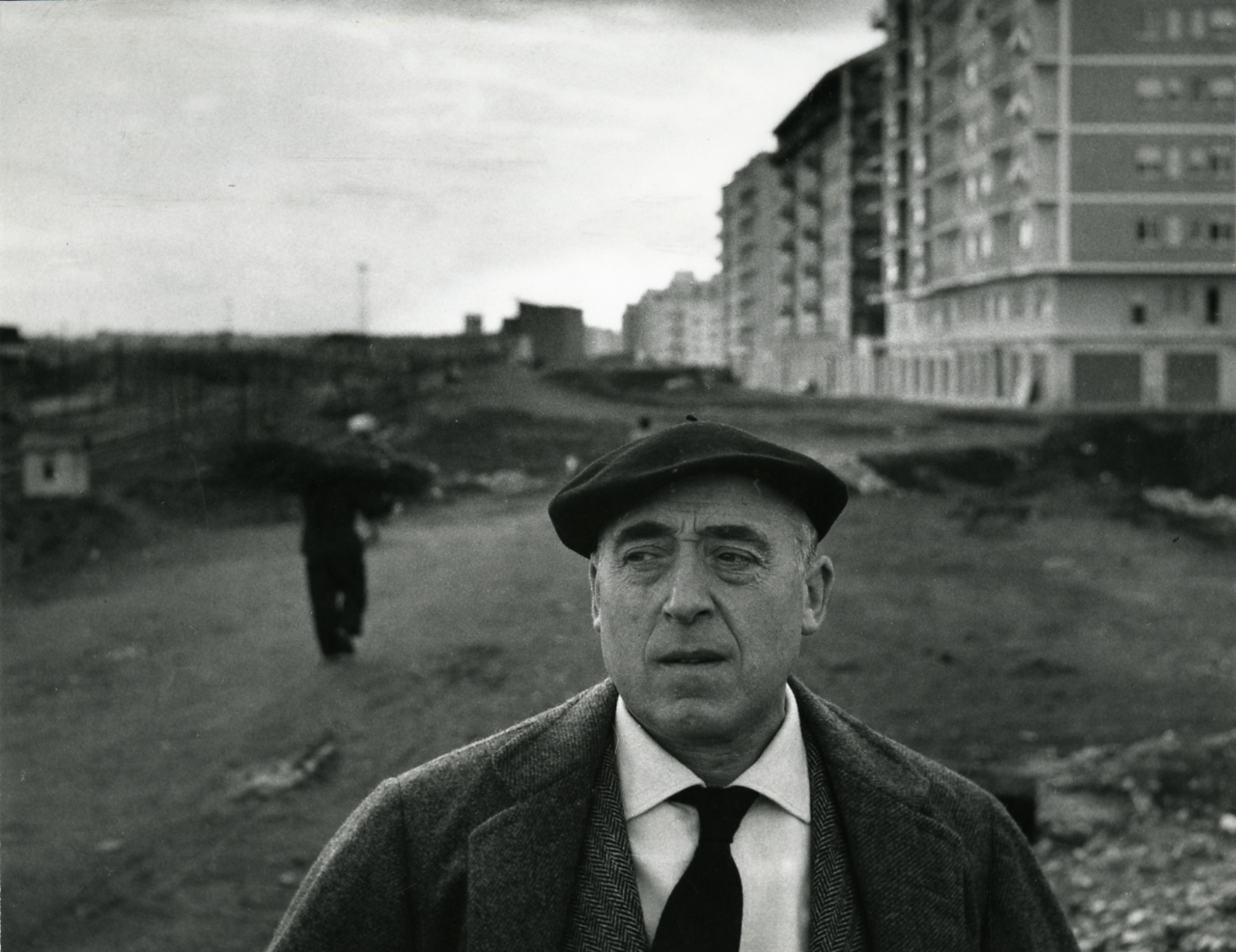
- Cesare Zavattini (photo by Paolo Monti, 1975)
- Born: 20 September 1902; Luzzara, Italy
- Died: 13 October 1989 (aged 87); Rome, Italy
- Occupation: Screenwriter
- Years active: 1936–1975
- Children: Arturo Zavattini

Cesare Zavattini (20 September 1902 – 13 October 1989) was an Italian screenwriter and one of the first theorists and proponents of the Neorealist movement in Italian cinema.

== Biography ==
Born in Luzzara near Reggio Emilia in northern Italy, on 20 September 1902, Zavattini studied law at the University of Parma, but devoted himself to writing. He started his career in Gazzetta di Parma. In 1930 he relocated to Milan, and worked for the book and magazine publisher Angelo Rizzoli. After Rizzoli began producing films in 1934, Zavattini received his first screenplay and story credits in 1936. At the same time he was writing the plot for the comic strip Saturn against the Earth with Federico Pedrocchi (script) and Giovanni Scolari (art) for I tre porcellini (1936–1937) and Topolino (1937–1946).

In 1935, he met Vittorio De Sica, beginning a partnership that produced some twenty films, including such masterpieces of Italian neorealism as Sciuscià (1946), Ladri di biciclette (1948), Miracolo a Milano (1951), and Umberto D. (1952).

In 1952, Zavattini gave an interview to The Italian Film Magazine 2, republished in English as "Some Ideas on the Cinema". The thirteen points Zavattini outlined are widely regarded as his manifesto to Italian neorealism.

In his only experience in Hollywood, Zavattini wrote the screenplay for The Children of Sanchez (1978) based on Oscar Lewis's book of the same title, a classic study of a Mexican family. At the 11th Moscow International Film Festival in 1979, he was awarded the Honorable Prize for the contribution to cinema. In 1983 he was a member of the jury at the 13th Moscow International Film Festival.

Zavattini died in Rome on 13 October 1989.

== Directors ==
Among the many celebrated directors of Italian and international cinema Zavattini worked with in his more than 80 films are:

- Vittorio De Sica
- Michelangelo Antonioni
- Hall Bartlett
- Alessandro Blasetti
- Mauro Bolognini
- Mario Camerini
- René Clément
- Federico Fellini
- Pietro Germi
- Alberto Lattuada
- Mario Monicelli
- Elio Petri
- Dino Risi
- Roberto Rossellini
- Mario Soldati
- Paolo and Vittorio Taviani
- Luchino Visconti

Also, In the short story "La Santa", by Nobel Prize winner Gabriel García Márquez a character is named after Zavattini. In the story, the character is a teacher of cinema.

== Selected filmography ==
- I'll Give a Million (1936)
- The Dance of Time (1936)
- Una famiglia impossibile (1940)
- Saint John, the Beheaded (1940)
- A Woman Has Fallen (1941)
- Don Cesare di Bazan (1942)
- Before the Postman (1942)
- Fourth Page (1942)
- The Children Are Watching Us (1943)
- The Gates of Heaven (1945)
- Rome, Free City (1946)
- Biraghin (1946)
- Un giorno nella vita (1946)
- The Testimony (1946)
- Shoeshine (1946)
- The Unknown Man of San Marino (1946)
- Tragic Hunt (1947)
- Crime News (1947)
- The Great Dawn (1947)
- Lost in the Dark (1947)
- Bicycle Thieves (1948)
- Twenty Years (1949)
- The Bride Can't Wait (1949)
- The Walls of Malapaga (1949)
- Father's Dilemma (1950)
- The Sky Is Red (1950)
- Miracle in Milan (1951)
- Bellissima (1951)
- Mamma Mia, What an Impression! (1951)
- Rome 11:00 (1952)
- Five Paupers in an Automobile (1952)
- Umberto D. (1952)
- The Overcoat (1952)
- A Husband for Anna (1953)
- The Walk (1953)
- Love in the City (1953)
- Terminal Station (1953)
- Cavallina storna (1953)
- We, the Women (1953)
- Ali Baba and the Forty Thieves (1954)
- The Gold of Naples (1954)
- Angels of Darkness (1954)
- The Doll That Took the Town (1956)
- The Awakening (1956)
- The Roof (1956)
- Love and Chatter (1958)
- Nel blu, dipinto di blu (1958)
- Two Women (1960)
- Atomic War Bride (1960)
- Lipstick (1960)
- Blood Feud (1961)
- The Last Judgment (1961)
- The Condemned of Altona (1962)
- Arturo's Island (1962)
- Yesterday, Today and Tomorrow (1963)
- Il Boom (1963)
- Marriage Italian Style (1964)
- Un monde nouveau (1966)
- After the Fox (1966)
- Woman Times Seven (1967)
- Caprice Italian Style (1968)
- A Place for Lovers (1968)
- Sunflower (1970)
- The Garden of the Finzi-Continis (1970)
- Lo chiameremo Andrea (1972)
- A Brief Vacation (1973)
- The Voyage (1974)
- A Simple Heart (1977)

== Bibliography ==
- Mino Argentieri, Neorealismo ecc. / Cesare Zavattini, Milano : Bompiani, 1979.
- Guglielmo Moneti, Lessico zavattiniano : parole e idee su cinema e dintorni, Venezia, Marsilio, 1992.
- Félix Monguilot Benzal, Piruetas juveniles: génesis, desarrollo y fortuna de la película olvidada de Cesare Zavattini en España, Actas del XIII Congreso de la AEHC, Vía Láctea Editorial, Perillo, 2011, pp. 381–390.
- Cesare Zavattini, Parliamo tanto di me, Milano, Bompiani, 1977.
- Cesare Zavattini, 'Some Ideas on the Cinema,' Sight and Sound 23:2 (October–December 1953),64-9. Edited from a recorded interview published in La revista del cinema italiano 2 (December 1952). Translated by Pier Luigi Lanza
