= Bread, Love and Jealousy =

- Belgian poster
- Directed by: Luigi Comencini
- Written by: Luigi Comencini; Ettore Margadonna
- Produced by: Marcello Girosi
- Starring: Vittorio De Sica; Gina Lollobrigida
- Cinematography: Arturo Gallea
- Edited by: Mario Serandrei
- Music by: Alessandro Cicognini
- Distributed by: Titanus
- Release date: 6 December 1954
- Running time: 97 minutes
- Country: Italy
- Language: Italian

Bread, Love and Jealousy (Italian: Pane, amore e gelosia), known as Frisky in the US, is a 1954 Italian romantic comedy film directed by Luigi Comencini. It is the second part of the Italian trilogy, preceded by Bread, Love and Dreams and followed by Scandal in Sorrento.

== Plot ==
Antonio (Vittorio De Sica) is in love with the midwife Annarella (Marisa Merlini), knowing that she has a son. Both of them are in love with each other, until the father of the child, who also serves in the military, appears and, with the help of the priest Don Emidio (Virgilio Riento), is reunited with his son.

Having to spend the next twenty months far from the village, Pietro (Roberto Risso) asks the marshal to take care of Maria (Gina Lollobrigida). Despite not being happy to spend time with the captain, because of her poverty and her need to collect the dowry, she goes to serve at the marshal’s house, since his maid, Caramella (Tina Pica), is ill.

The villagers start spreading gossips about the marshal and Maria, which will reach to Pietro too. One day, during a lunch at the house of Maria's cousin, the marshal dances with her and is seen by both Pietro and Annarella. Seeing them dancing intimately, Maria and Pietro break up. As the relationship is over, Maria leaves the house and joins a dancing group. Her mother asks the marshal to help her, saying that she is under-aged. When the marshal goes for an enquiry, the owner of the dance company convinces the mother of Maria with money, while the marshal discovers that she is not actually under age. Maria tries to seduce the marshal but without success.

Finally Pietro and Maria will be reunited and will leave the village. The marshal comes wave them goodbye at the station. While going back, he meets a middle aged spinster who's going to the village as the new midwife.

== Cast ==
- Vittorio De Sica as Antonio Carotenuto
- Gina Lollobrigida as Maria De Ritis
- Marisa Merlini as Annarella Mirziano
- Maria-Pia Casilio as Paoletta
- Virgilio Riento as Don Emidio
- Tina Pica as Caramella
- Tecla Scarano as Teresinella
- Saro Urzì as Don Nicola, il capocomico
- Roberto Risso as Pietro Stelluti
- Memmo Carotenuto as Sirio Baiocchi
- Vittoria Crispo as Maria Antonia De Ritis

== Overview and response ==
Pane, amore e gelosia is usually considered one of the most famous examples of Pink neorealism. Tina Pica won the Nastro d'Argento as Best Supporting Actress for this film.

== Soundtrack ==
- "Aida" (Composed by Giuseppe Verdi)
