= Cocagne (film) =

- Directed by: Maurice Cloche
- Written by: Yvan Audouard (story); Maurice Cloche; Jean Manse
- Produced by: Bernard Roland
- Starring: Fernandel; Dora Doll; Leda Gloria
- Cinematography: Roger Hubert
- Edited by: Fanchette Mazin
- Music by: Jean Leccia
- Production companies: David Films; Jad Films; Paris Elysées Films
- Distributed by: Société nouvelle de cinématographie
- Release date: 8 March 1961
- Running time: 92 minutes
- Countries: France; Italy
- Language: French

Cocagne is a 1961 French-Italian comedy film directed by Maurice Cloche and starring Fernandel, Dora Doll and Leda Gloria. A simple man unexpectedly gains enormous fame as a celebrated artist, to the scepticism of his family and friends.

It was shot at the Billancourt Studios in Paris with location shooting in Arles and the Camargue. The film's sets were designed by the art director Jacques Paris.

== Plot ==
Marc-Antoine, a garbage truck driver in Arles, lives a quiet life with his wife, Mélanie, and their two children. When the local petanque club's mascot is stolen, Marc-Antoine suggests painting a new one. His artwork makes him a local sensation, leading him to leave his family for a painting venture with a young waitress named Hélène. However, he soon realizes that his newfound success feels empty and dishonest. Understanding that true happiness lies with his family and friends, Marc-Antoine returns to his simple life without any regrets.

== Cast ==
- Fernandel as Marc-Antoine
- Dora Doll as Hélène
- Leda Gloria as Mélanie
- Rellys as Septime
- Andrex as Amedee
- René Génin as Mathias
- Paul Préboist as Banane
- Edmond Ardisson as Un collègue de Marc-Antoine
- Paul Boussard as Claude
- José Casa as Un collègue de Marc-Antoine
- Jean Franval as Un habitué du bistrot
- Marie-Thérèse Izar as Augusta
- Josette Jordan as Mireille
- Julien Maffre as Le facteur
- Léon Zitrone as himself
- Memmo Carotenuto as Mauricio, le cinéaste
- Roberto Risso as Vincente
- Marie-Therese Eicholtzer as Louise
- Pierre Mirat as Le docteur

== Bibliography ==
- Goble, Alan. The Complete Index to Literary Sources in Film. Walter de Gruyter, 1999.
