= The Roof (1956 film) =

1956 film

- Directed by: Vittorio De Sica
- Written by: Cesare Zavattini
- Produced by: Vittorio De Sica
- Starring: Gabriella Pallotta; Giorgio Listuzzi
- Cinematography: Carlo Montuori
- Edited by: Eraldo Da Roma
- Music by: Alessandro Cicognini
- Release dates: October 6, 1956 (Italy); May 12, 1959 (US)
- Running time: 91 minutes
- Country: Italy
- Language: Italian

The Roof (Italian: Il tetto) is a 1956 Italian drama film directed and produced by Vittorio De Sica.

== Plot ==
Natale, an apprentice bricklayer, and Luisa, who has no marketable skill, marry and try to live with Natale's parents and other relatives in one apartment, what might happen in the poorest classes in Rome about 1950. After a quarrel Natale and Luisa precipitately leave without a place to live. The remainder of the film is devoted to their finding housing. The solution is building a one-room brick dwelling as a squat on unused railway land on the outskirts of Rome. As it was illegal, Natale arranges for his workmates to assist him during the night. According to the rules, if a dwelling has a door and a roof the householder cannot be evicted. At dawn when the police arrive to remove them the dwelling is complete except for part of the roof, but a humane policeman looks the other way. The happy ending is not without realism. In financial straits, and facing imprisonment later, Natale and Luisa, now pregnant, will encounter difficulties ahead.

"[The Roof] is a confirmation of the power of neorealist principles ... De Sica has seen to it that every incident, every detail in every shot contributes to a sense of unstrained, unforced actuality" (Arthur Knight, Saturday Review). We have secured a recent restoration of the film that marked De Sica's final return to the classic neorealism of Bicycle Thieves after forays into romantic melodrama (Terminal Station) and Neapolitan comedy (The Gold of Naples). Two non-professional actors (one a soccer star) give winning performances as a newly married couple who, after a family quarrel, are left homeless in Rome. A bricklayer by trade, the husband conscripts his co-workers to help build an abode overnight, hoping that the police won't find the couple's new "roof" illegal and have it destroyed. "A lovely little seriocomic film ... deeply touching" (Bosley Crowther, The New York Times).

== Cast ==
- Gabriella Pallotta - Luisa (as Gabriella Pallotti)
- Giorgio Listuzzi - Natale, Luisa's husband
- Luisa Alessandri - Signora Baj
- Angelo Bigioni
- Maria Di Fiori - Giovanna, Natale's sister
- Maria Di Rollo - Gina
- Emilia Maritini - Luisa's mother
- Giuseppe Martini - Luisa's father
- Gastone Renzelli - Cesare, Giovanna's husband
- Maria Sittoro - Natale's mother
- Angelo Visentin - Natale's father

== Honors ==
The film was presented in the official selection in competition at the 1956 Cannes Film Festival where it received the Prix de l'Office Catholique (OCIC).

He also received the 1957 Silver Ribbon of Italian Cinema for the screenplay.

== Awards ==
- 1956 Cannes Film Festival: OCIC Award
- Nastro d'Argento: Best Script.

== Restoration ==
The film was restored in 1999 thanks to the Vittorio De Sica Friends Association and edited by Manuel De Sica. The restored film was then screened on April 4, 2004, at the Morlacchi Theater in Perugia.
