= Umberto D. =

1952 Italian film by Vittorio De Sica

- Directed by: Vittorio De Sica
- Written by: Cesare Zavattini
- Produced by: Angelo Rizzoli; Vittorio De Sica; Giuseppe Amato
- Starring: Carlo Battisti; Maria-Pia Casilio; Lina Gennari
- Cinematography: G. R. Aldo
- Edited by: Eraldo Da Roma
- Music by: Alessandro Cicognini
- Distributed by: Dear Film
- Release dates: 20 January 1952 (Italy); 7 November 1955 (USA)
- Running time: 89 minutes
- Country: Italy
- Language: Italian

Umberto D. (pronounced [umˈbɛrto (d)ˈdi]) is a 1952 Italian neorealist film directed by Vittorio De Sica. Most of the actors were non-professional, including Carlo Battisti who plays the title role of Umberto Domenico Ferrari, a poor elderly man in Rome who is desperately trying to keep his rented room. His landlady (Lina Gennari) is evicting him and his only true friends, the housemaid (Maria-Pia Casilio) and his dog Flike (called 'Flag' in some subtitled versions of the film) are of no help.

According to Robert Osborne of Turner Classic Movies, this was De Sica's favorite of all his films. The movie was included in TIME magazine's "All-TIME 100 Movies" in 2005. The film's sets were designed by Virgilio Marchi. In 2008, the film was included on the Italian Ministry of Cultural Heritage’s 100 Italian films to be saved, a list of 100 films that "have changed the collective memory of the country between 1942 and 1978."

== Plot ==
Police disperse an organized street demonstration of elderly men demanding a raise in their meager pensions. One of the marchers is Umberto D. Ferrari, a retired government worker.

He returns to his room and finds that his landlady has rented it out for an hour to a young couple to have sex. She threatens to evict Ferrari at the end of the month if he cannot pay the overdue rent, fifteen thousand lire. He sells a watch and some books, but only raises a third of the amount. The landlady refuses to accept partial payment.

Meanwhile, the sympathetic maid confides in Umberto that she has her own problems. She is three months pregnant, but is unsure which of her two lovers (both soldiers) is the father, the tall one from Naples or the short one from Florence.

Feeling ill, Umberto gets himself admitted to a hospital. It turns out to be tonsillitis and he is discharged after a few days. When he returns to the apartment, he finds workmen renovating the entire place. The landlady is getting married. Umberto's room has a gaping hole in the wall. The maid tells him it is to become part of an enlarged living room. The maid was taking care of his dog Flike, but a door was left open and Flike ran away.

Umberto rushes to the city pound and is relieved to find his dog; however, when he makes a veiled plea for a loan to one of his friends who has a job, the friend refuses to listen. Unable to bring himself to beg from strangers on the street Umberto contemplates suicide, but knows he must first see that Flike is taken care of. He packs his belongings and leaves the apartment. His parting advice to the maid is to get rid of the boyfriend from Florence.

Umberto attempts to find a place for Flike, first with a couple who board dogs, then a little girl he knows, but the latter's nanny makes her give the dog back. Flike goes to play with some children and Umberto slips away, hoping that one of them will adopt him. Despite Umberto's attempt to abandon Flike, the dog finds him hiding under a footbridge. Finally in desperation, Umberto takes the dog in his arms and walks on to a railway track as a speeding train approaches. Flike becomes frightened, wriggles free and flees. Umberto runs after him. At first, Flike seems to be frightened and hides from Umberto, but Flike seems to be coaxing Umberto away from the tracks and back into the park. The chase slowly morphs into play as Umberto lures Flike with a pine cone. The movie ends with Umberto and Flike running and playing down the park lane.

== Cast ==
- Carlo Battisti as Umberto Domenico Ferrari
- Maria-Pia Casilio as Maria, the maid
- Lina Gennari as Antonia Belloni, the landlady
- Ileana Simova as the woman in Umberto's room
- Elena Rea as the nun at the hospital
- Memmo Carotenuto as a patient at the hospital
- Alberto Albari Barbieri as Antonia's friend
- Napoleone as Flike [uncredited]

== Reception ==
De Sica said that the film was quite unpopular in Italy because it was in a period after World War II when the country was just getting back on its feet. Subsequently, they saw Umberto D. as too critical of the pride they were trying to engender in themselves. It evoked such opposition in conservatives that Giulio Andreotti, the minister responsible for cinema at the time, published an open letter against De Sica, saying that if the movie was perceived as a realistic depiction of mid-twentieth century Italy, he "[would] have rendered a very bad service to [the] country". However, it was quite popular overseas and the film remained the one he was most proud of (even dedicating the film to his father).

In an interview where he discussed Diary of a Country Priest, Psycho and Citizen Kane, Ingmar Bergman is quoted as saying, "Umberto D. is ... a movie I have seen a hundred times, that I may love most of all."

Martin Scorsese included it on a list of "39 Essential Foreign Films for a Young Filmmaker."

Roger Ebert included the film in his selection of Great Movies, writing that "Vittorio De Sica's Umberto D (1952) is the story of the old man's struggle to keep from falling from poverty into shame. It may be the best of the Italian neorealist films--the one that is most simply itself, and does not reach for its effects or strain to make its message clear."

On review aggregator Rotten Tomatoes, the film holds a 98% score based on 41 critic reviews, with an average rating of 9.0/10. The website's critics consensus reads, "Anchored by Carlo Battisti's moving performance as Umberto D, Vittorio de Sica's deeply empathetic character study is a bracing glimpse into the lives of the downtrodden." Metacritic, which uses a weighted average, assigned the film a score of 92 out of 100, based on 9 critics, indicating "universal acclaim".

=== Awards and nominations ===
- Vittorio De Sica was nominated for the Grand Prix – 1952 Cannes Film Festival
- 1955 New York Film Critics Circle Award for Best Foreign Film
- Cesare Zavattini was nominated for the Academy Award for Best Story at the 29th Academy Awards in 1957

== Remake ==
A French remake entitled A Man and His Dog premiered in 2008. The film was directed by Francis Huster, co-written by Huster and Murielle Magellan, and stars Jean-Paul Belmondo in his first role in seven years, alongside Hafsia Herzi, Julika Jenkins and Francis Huster among others.
