= The Gold of Naples =

L'Oro di Napoli
- Poster
- Directed by: Vittorio De Sica
- Written by: Giuseppe Marotta (novel); Vittorio De Sica; Cesare Zavattini
- Produced by: Dino De Laurentiis; Marcello Girosi; Carlo Ponti
- Starring: Silvana Mangano; Sophia Loren; Paolo Stoppa; Totò
- Cinematography: Carlo Montuori
- Edited by: Eraldo Da Roma
- Music by: Alessandro Cicognini
- Production company: Ponti-De Laurentiis Cinematografica
- Distributed by: Paramount Films
- Release dates: 23 December 1954 (Italy); 11 February 1957 (USA)
- Running time: 131 minutes (Italy); 107 minutes (USA)
- Country: Italy
- Language: Italian
- Box office: $72,000 (US rental)

The Gold of Naples (Italian: L'oro di Napoli [ˈlɔːro di ˈnaːpoli]) is a 1954 Italian anthology film directed by Vittorio De Sica. It was entered into the 1955 Cannes Film Festival. In 2008, the film was included on the Italian Ministry of Cultural Heritage’s 100 Italian films to be saved, a list of 100 films that "have changed the collective memory of the country between 1942 and 1978."

== Plot ==
The film is a tribute to Naples, where director De Sica spent his first years, this is a collection of 6 Neapolitan episodes: a clown exploited by a hoodlum; an unfaithful pizza seller (Loren) losing her wedding ring; the funeral of a child; the impoverished inveterate gambler Count Prospero B. being reduced to force his doorman's preteen kid to play cards with him (and losing regularly); the unexpected and unusual wedding of Teresa, a prostitute; the exploits of "professor" Ersilio Miccio, a "wisdom seller" who "solves problems".

== Cast ==
=== "Il guappo" ("El Camorrista ") ===
- Totò – Don Saverio Petrillo
- Lianella Carell – Carolina, Saverio's wife
- Pasquale Cennamo – Don Carmine Savarone, the squatter
- Agostino Salvietti – Gennaro Esposito, El Camorrista.

=== "Pizze a credito" ("Pizza on Credit") ===
- Sophia Loren – Sofia
- Paolo Stoppa – Don Peppino, the widower
- Giacomo Furia – Rosario, Sofia's husband
- Alberto Farnese – Alfredo, Sofia's lover
- Tecla Scarano – Don Peppino's friend

=== "Funeralino" ===
- Teresa De Vita – The mother

=== "I giocatori" ("Ludopata") ===
- Vittorio De Sica – Count Prospero B.
- Pierino Bilancioni – Gennarino, the young gambler
- Lars Borgström – Federico, the doorkeeper
- Mario Passante – Giovanni, the butler
- Irene Montaldo – Countess B.

=== "Teresa" ("Theresa") ===
- Silvana Mangano – Teresa
- Erno Crisa – Don Nicola
- Ubaldo Maestri – Don Ubaldo

=== "Il professore" ===
- Eduardo De Filippo – Don Ersilio Miccio
- Tina Pica – The elderly lady
- Nino Imparato – Gennaro
- Gianni Crosio – Alfonso Maria di Sant'Agata dei Fornai

== Release ==
The original Italian release comprises six segments: "Il guappo", "Pizze a credito", "Funeralino", "I giocatori", "Teresa", and "Il professore". The US version omits the third and the sixth, leaving the following: "The Racketeer", "Pizza on Credit", "The Gambler", and "Theresa".

Paramount did not take up its option to release the film in the United States and it wasn't until February 1957 that the film was finally distributed there, being shown at the Paris Theater in New York for 18 weeks, earning the distributor, Distributors Corporation of America, $72,000. The film was voted one of the Ten Best Foreign Language Films of 1957 by The New York Times.
