= Bread, Love and Andalusia =

1958 film

- Directed by: Javier Setó
- Written by: Jesús María de Arozamena; Sandro Continenza; Luciana Corda; Ettore Maria Margadonna; Mariano Ozores; Alfonso Paso; Antonio Quintero
- Produced by: Vittorio De Sica; Benito Perojo
- Starring: Carmen Sevilla; Vittorio De Sica; Vicente Parra
- Cinematography: Antonio L. Ballesteros
- Edited by: Antonio Ramírez de Loaysa
- Music by: Alessandro Cicognini
- Production companies: Producciones Benito Perojo; Produzione Films Vittorio De Sica; Trevi Cinematografica
- Release date: 4 December 1958
- Running time: 95 minutes
- Countries: Italy; Spain
- Language: Spanish

Bread, Love and Andalusia (Italian: Pane, amore e Andalusia, Spanish: Pan, amor y Andalucía) is a 1958 Italian-Spanish comedy film directed by Javier Setó and starring Carmen Sevilla, Vittorio De Sica and Vicente Parra. De Sica reprises his role as the Carabinieri officer Carotenuto from Bread, Love and Dreams. He travels to Seville where he falls in love with a beautiful young dancer.

== Plot ==
A commander of the municipal police of Sorrento (Italy) and director of the music band, makes a trip to Seville to appear at a festival. There, he falls in love with a young singer and dancer.

== Cast ==
- Carmen Sevilla as Carmen García
- Vittorio De Sica as Maresciallo Carotenuto
- Vicente Parra as Paco
- Peppino De Filippo as Peppino
- Lea Padovani as Donna Violante Ruotolo
- Pastora Imperio as Maestra de baile
- Mario Carotenuto as Don Matteo Carotenuto
- Josefina Serratosa as Tía de Carmen
- Jacinto San Emeterio
- Carmen Sánchez as Tía de Paco
- Julio Goróstegui as Prior
- María de los Ángeles Such
- Miguel del Castillo as Músico
- Rodolfo del Campo
- Dolores Palumbo
- José Nieto as Don Pablo
- Columba Domínguez
- Antonio as Bailarín
- Vitoria Parra

== Bibliography ==
- Bentley, Bernard. A Companion to Spanish Cinema. Boydell & Brewer, 2008.
