= Bread, Love and Dreams =

- Directed by: Luigi Comencini
- Written by: Luigi Comencini; Ettore Margadonna
- Produced by: Marcello Girosi
- Starring: Vittorio De Sica; Gina Lollobrigida
- Cinematography: Arturo Gallea
- Edited by: Mario Serandrei
- Music by: Alessandro Cicognini
- Distributed by: Titanus (Italy); I.F.E. Releasing Corporation (USA)
- Release date: 22 December 1953
- Running time: 90 minutes
- Country: Italy
- Language: Italian

Bread, Love and Dreams (Italian: Pane, amore e fantasia) is a 1953 Italian romantic comedy film directed by Luigi Comencini. At the 4th Berlin International Film Festival it won the Silver Bear award. In 2008, the film was included on the Italian Ministry of Cultural Heritage’s 100 Italian films to be saved, a list of 100 films that "have changed the collective memory of the country between 1942 and 1978".

== Plot ==
The film is set in Sagliena, an imaginary small town in central Italy; Marshal Antonio Carotenuto, an elderly womanizer who will have to adapt to the monotonous and quiet life of the village, is transferred here immediately after the war. Supported by the maid Caramella, the marshal runs the local Carabinieri station. Here he meets "Pizzicarella la Bersagliera", a young local girl secretly in love with the carabiniere Stelluti. At first the marshal tries to get engaged to the "Bersagliera", as Paoletta, the sacristan of the parish, is in love with the carabiniere Stelluti, but the latter is actually in love with the Bersagliera and wants her mother to know her. So, thanks to the intervention of Don Emidio, who informs the marshal, Stelluti and the Bersagliera get engaged while the marshal, on the evening of the feast of Sant'Antonio, gets engaged to the town's midwife: Annarella.

== Cast ==
- Vittorio De Sica as Antonio Carotenuto
- Gina Lollobrigida as Maria De Ritis
- Marisa Merlini as Annarella Mirziano
- Virgilio Riento as Don Emidio
- Tina Pica as Caramella
- Maria-Pia Casilio as Paoletta
- Roberto Risso as Pietro Stelluti
- Memmo Carotenuto as Sirio Baiocchi
- Vittoria Crispo as Maria Antonia De Ritis
- Guglielmo Barnabò as Don Concezio

== Reception ==
Pane, amore e fantasia is usually considered the most famous example of Pink neorealism.

The film contains what many critics regard as Gina Lollobrigida's best and most naturalistic performance.

== Sequels ==
The film's popularity resulted in two sequels, one with Lollobrigida in 1954: Pane, amore e gelosia (Bread, Love and Jealousy, US title: Frisky) and the open-ended Pane, amore e... (English title: Scandal in Sorrento) in 1955, starring Sophia Loren in the female lead role. De Sica also reprised his role in the Spanish-set Bread, Love and Andalusia (1958).

== In popular culture ==
In The Andy Griffith Show, Season 5, Episode 17, Barney Fife sends a letter saying he watched this movie while on vacation in Raleigh, NC. However, he calls the movie “Bread, Love and Beans” in his letter to Andy.
