= Memmo Carotenuto =

Italian actor (1908–1980)

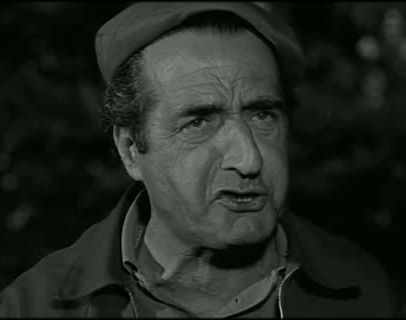
- Memmo Carotenuto in Gli onorevoli (1963)
- Born: 23 August 1908; Rome, Italy
- Died: 23 December 1980 (aged 72); Rome, Italy
- Occupation: Actor
- Years active: 1941–1980
- Children: Bruno Carotenuto
- Father: Nello Carotenuto
- Relatives: Mario Carotenuto (brother)

Memmo Carotenuto (23 August 1908 – 23 December 1980) was an Italian actor. He appeared in 125 films between 1941 and 1980.

== Selected filmography ==
- The Wedding Trip (1969)
- Assassination in Rome (1965)
- Male Companion (1964)
- Cocagne (1961)
- Ten Ready Rifles (1959)
- Ferdinando I, re di Napoli (1959)
- Everyone's in Love (1959)
- My Wife's Enemy (1959)
- Tuppe tuppe, Marescià! (1958)
- The Italians They Are Crazy (1958)
- Legs of Gold (1958)
- Big Deal on Madonna Street (1958)
- The Most Wonderful Moment (1957)
- Fathers and Sons (1957)
- Poor, But Handsome (1957)
- The Bigamist (1956)
- Lucky to Be a Woman (1956)
- The Band of Honest Men (1956)
- Chéri-Bibi (1955)
- Bread, Love and Jealousy (1954)
- A Slice of Life (1954)
- Too Bad She's Bad (1954)
- Disowned (1954)
- The Three Thieves (1954)
- House of Ricordi (1954)
- Via Padova 46 (1953)
- Bread, Love and Dreams (1953)
- If You Won a Hundred Million (1953)
- Umberto D. (1952)
- Bicycle Thieves (1948)
