= Ettore Margadonna =

Italian screenwriter

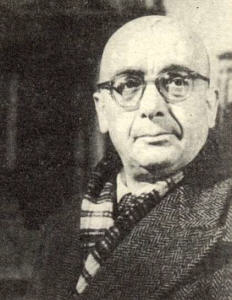
Ettore Maria Margadonna

Ettore Margadonna (30 November 1893 – 28 October 1975) was an Italian screenwriter. He was nominated for the Academy Award for Best Story for the film Bread, Love and Dreams (1953).

== Selected filmography ==
- The Ferocious Saladin (1937)
- All of Life in One Night (1938)
- Star of the Sea (1938)
- Pietro Micca (1938)
- Mad Animals (1939)
- The Sons of the Marquis Lucera (1939)
- Backstage (1939)
- Diamonds (1939)
- The Happy Ghost (1941)
- Malombra (1942)
- Last Love (1947)
- The Opium Den (1947)
- The Black Captain (1951)
- Bread, Love and Dreams (1953)
- Il viale della speranza (1953)
- Tuppe tuppe, Marescià! (1958)
