= Vittorio De Sica =

Italian film director and actor (1901–1974)

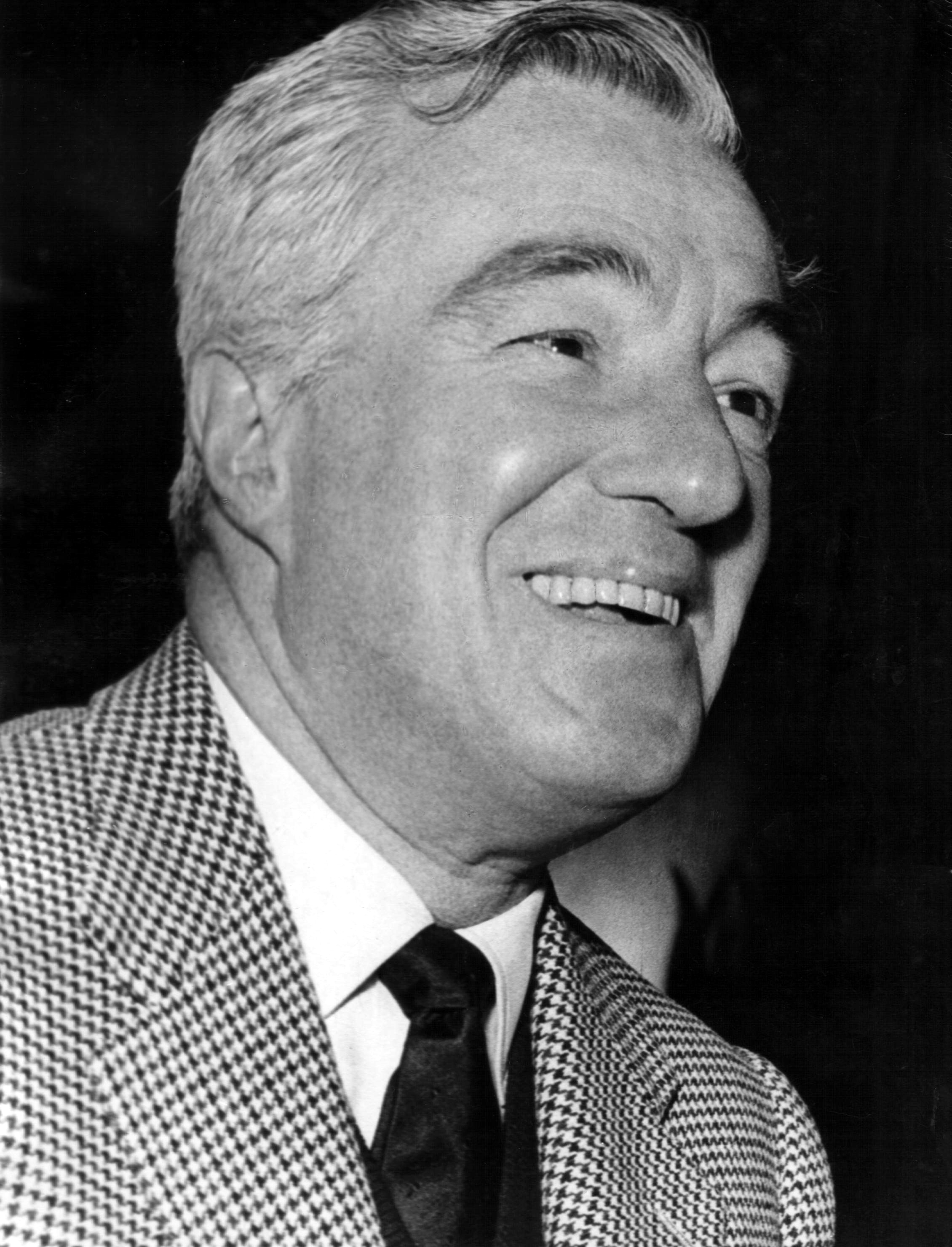
- De Sica in 1959
- Born: 7 July 1901; Sora, Lazio, Kingdom of Italy
- Died: 13 November 1974 (aged 73); Neuilly-sur-Seine, France
- Occupations: Film director; actor
- Years active: 1917–1974
- Spouses: Giuditta Rissone (m. 1937; div. 1954); María Mercader (m. 1968)
- Children: 3, including Christian and Manuel

Signature
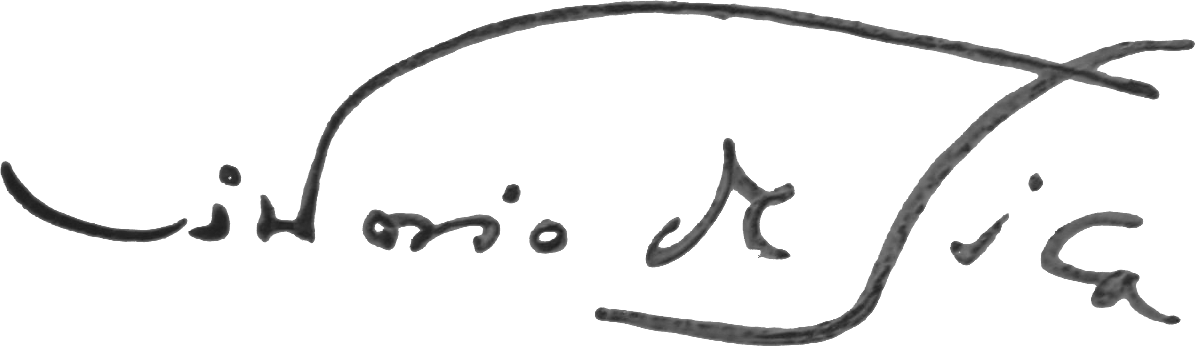

Vittorio De Sica (/də ˈsiːkə/ də SEE-kə; Italian: [vitˈtɔːrjo de ˈsiːka]; 7 July 1901 – 13 November 1974) was an Italian film director and actor, a leading figure in the neorealist movement.

Widely considered one of the most influential filmmakers in the history of cinema, four of the films he directed won Academy Awards: Sciuscià and Bicycle Thieves (honorary), while Yesterday, Today and Tomorrow, and Il giardino dei Finzi Contini won the Academy Award for Best Foreign Language Film. Indeed, the great critical success of Sciuscià (the first foreign film to be so recognized by the Academy of Motion Picture Arts and Sciences) and Bicycle Thieves helped establish the permanent Best Foreign Film Award. These two films are considered part of the canon of classic cinema. Bicycle Thieves was deemed the greatest film of all time by Sight & Sound magazine's poll of filmmakers and critics in 1952, and was cited by Turner Classic Movies as one of the 15 most influential films in cinema history.

De Sica was also nominated for the Academy Award for Best Supporting Actor for playing Major Rinaldi in American director Charles Vidor's 1957 adaptation of Ernest Hemingway's A Farewell to Arms, a movie that was panned by critics and proved a box office flop. De Sica's acting was considered the highlight of the film.

== Early life ==
De Sica was born on 7 July 1901 in Sora, Lazio. His father Umberto De Sica was from Giffoni Valle Piana, Campania; he was a journalist, and in the later years worked for the Bank of Italy. Teresa Manfredi, his mother, had Neapolitan origins. De Sica was baptised in the church of San Giovanni Battista in Sora under the name Vittorio Domenico Stanislao Gaetano Sorano De Sica. He had a very close relationship with his father and later dedicated to him the film Umberto D. The first interest in cinema sparked in Vittorio due to his father's occasional performances in silent movies: he filled in for the pianists. As an adult, Vittorio De Sica described their family state in his early years as 'tragic and aristocratic poverty'.

In 1914, the family moved to Naples. Upon the outbreak of the First World War, they moved to Florence. Eventually, they settled down in Rome. At the age of 15, De Sica started performing as an actor in amateur plays staged in hospitals for recovering soldiers. He began studying to become an accountant, but in 1917, through a family friend, Edoardo Bencivenga, he obtained a minor role in a film directed by Alfredo De Antoni, The Clemenceau Affair.

== Career ==
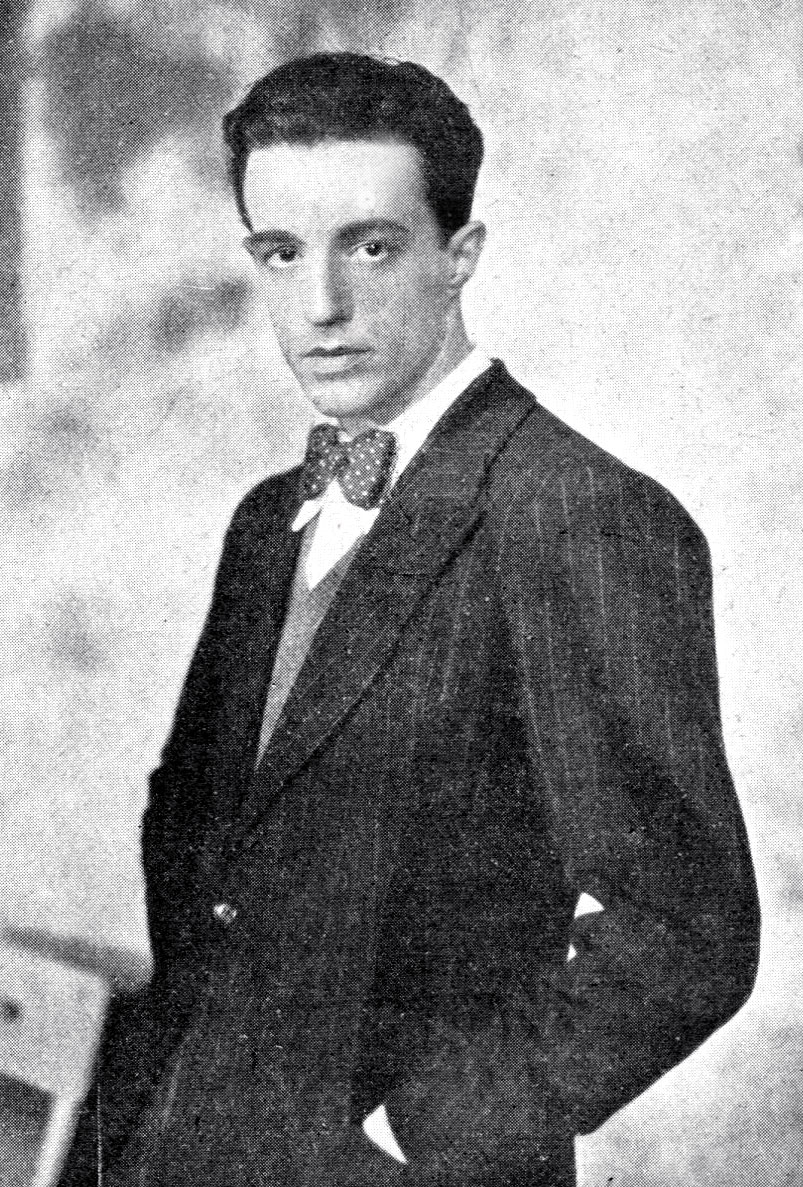
De Sica in the late 1920s

=== Theatre ===
De Sica was laureated in 1923. Described as strikingly handsome, already in the early 1920s he began his career as a theatre actor and joined Tatiana Pavlova's theatre company in 1923. With Pavlova he worked for two years and toured South America. In 1925, he joined the company of Italia Almirante Manzini and was soon referred to as the second-best in her troupe. Two years later he joined the company of Luigi Almirante, Sergio Tofano and Giuditta Rissone. De Sica debuted as a romantic protagonist in Ferenc Molnár's Gli occhi azzurri dell'imperatore. During that period he met Umberto Melnati, an actor from Livorno, with whom he formed a successful comic duo and collaborated in many films and theatre plays. On 3 October 1930, they premiered in Teatro Manzoni with L'isola meravigliosa based on Ugo Betti's play. They were soon spotted by Mario Mattoli who was then an impresario in Teatro Mazoni. Mattoli was impressed by the quality of their rehearsals and offered to join his company Za-Bum. With Za-Bum, De Sica, Rissone and Melnati played in Una segretaria per tutti, Un cattivo soggetto, Il signore desidera?, Lisetta, and many other revues written by Mattoli and Luciano Ramo. The duo became famous on the national level after the success of radio sketch Düra minga, dura no and a popular song Lodovico sei dolce come un fico sung by De Sica.

In 1933, De Sica, Rissone, and Tofano founded their own company. The period of Tofano-Rissone-De Sica was notable also due to De Sica's acquaintance to Aldo De Benedetti and Gherardo Gherardi, the screenwriters with whom he had a long and fruitful collaboration. Tofano-Rissone-De Sica performed mostly light comedies, but they also staged plays by Beaumarchais and worked with famous directors like Luchino Visconti. In 1936, the company was reformed into Rissone-De Sica-Melnati, and eventually disbanded in 1939. The play Due dozzine di rose scarlatte, written by Aldo De Benedetti, premiered on 11 March 1936, in Teatro Argentina. It is considered the best Italian comedy of the 1930s.

In 1937, De Sica married Giuditta Rissone, around that time the duo with Melnati was ended. In 1940, the spouses reconciled with Tofano and founded the mutual company again, where all the management tasks were taken over by Tofano. Together they released a series of successful plays: La scuola della maldicenza (based on Richard Brinsley Sheridan), Ma non è una cosa seria written by Luigi Pirandello, Il paese delle vacanze by Ugo Betti, Liolà, etc.

In 1945–46, he played in two productions directed by Alessandro Blasetti: Il tempo e la famiglia Conway written by John Boynton Priestley and Ma non è una cosa seria by Luigi Pirandello. During the season 1945–46 he spent playing in The Marriage of Figaro and collaborated with Luchino Visconti, Vivi Gioi and Nino Besozzi. In 1948–49 he acted in two new plays: The Time of Your Life and The Magnificent Cuckold written by Fernand Crommelynck and adapted by Mario Chiari. The Magnificent Cuckold became De Sica's last theatre performance after which he concentrated fully on cinema and TV projects. Between 1923 and 1949 De Sica took part in over 120 theatre performances.

=== Cinema ===
In the early years, De Sica combined his theatre and cinema careers: in the summer months, he was engaged in filmmaking and spent the winters performing on stage. In cinema, his first notable role was in 1932 Gli uomini, che mascalzoni directed by Mario Camerini. The song Parlami d'amore Mariù became a hit and remained his signature song for many years. In the 1930s his credits included many notable performances such as in I'll Give a Million (1935), Il signor Max (1937), Department Store (1939), and Manon Lescaut (1940). Between 1931 and 1940, he starred in and directed 23 productions.

In 1940, supported by producer Giuseppe Amato, De Sica debuted as a director and created Rose scarlatte.

In 1944, De Sica received an invitation from Goebbels to make a film in Prague, but refused, using an offer from the Catholic Film Centre in Rome as an excuse.

De Sica had first met screenwriter Cesare Zavattini in Verona in 1934. For many years they would become inseparable collaborators and created some of the most celebrated films of the post-war neorealistic age, like Sciuscià (Shoeshine) and Bicycle Thieves (released as The Bicycle Thief in America), both directed by De Sica.

De Sica's 1946 drama Sciuscià won the Academy Awards for Best Foreign Language Film in 1947. Despite the film's critical success, it failed in the Italian box office because the public craved easier films and mostly went to comedies. It was also heavily criticized by the Ministry of Justice and the Department of Correction. This alienation by the Italian authorities made it difficult for De Sica to finance his subsequent projects. To produce Bicycle Thieves, De Sica had to invest own money and rely on the support of several Italian businessmen. The film brought De Sica his second Oscar as well as multiple other awards and accolades, however, again the success in Italian box office was tepid. The relationship with the government remained bad, after the release of Umberto D. prime minister Giulio Andreotti sent De Sica a letter accusing him of 'rendering bad service for the country'.

In 1951, De Sica co-authored (with Alberto Sordi) and played in Mamma Mia, What an Impression! In 1952, he played along Gina Lollobrigida in In Olden Days and then again in 1953 in the comedy Bread, Love and Dreams. De Sica's character, Marshal Antonio Carotenuto, immediately became the public's favourite. The film was an enormous success, it was nominated for Academy Awards and won the Silver Bear at Berlinale. It was followed with three sequels: Bread, Love and Jealousy (1954), Scandal in Sorrento (1955), and Bread, Love and Andalusia (1958).

In 1961, he starred in The Two Marshals alongside Totò.

His 1963 film Ieri, oggi, domani (Yesterday, Today and Tomorrow) and his 1970 film Il giardino dei Finzi-Contini both won Academy Awards for Best Foreign Language film.

In 1974 he acted in Paul Morrissey's comedy horror film Blood for Dracula starring Joe Dallesandro and Udo Kier also including Roman Polanski. De Sica wrote his own lines on the set.

=== Television ===
In 1959, De Sica appeared in the British television series The Four Just Men.

His final role was in the 1976 television movie L'eroe by his son, Manuel.

== Personal life ==
His passion for gambling was well known and because of it, he often lost large sums of money and accepted work that might not otherwise have interested him. He never kept his gambling a secret from anyone; in fact, he projected it on characters in his own movies, like Count Max (which he acted in but did not direct) and The Gold of Naples, as well as in General Della Rovere, a film directed by Rossellini in which De Sica played the title role.

In 1937 Vittorio De Sica married the actress Giuditta Rissone, who gave birth to their daughter, Emilia (10 February 1938 – 23 March 2021). In 1942, on the set of Un garibaldino al convento, he met Spanish actress María Mercader (cousin of Ramon Mercader, Leon Trotsky's assassin), with whom he started a relationship. De Sica never parted from his first family: he led a double family life, with double celebrations on holidays. It is said that, at Christmas and on New Year's Eve, he used to put back the clocks by two hours in Mercader's house so that he could make a toast at midnight with both families. Rissone agreed to keep up the facade of a marriage so as not to leave her daughter without a father. After finally divorcing Rissone in France in 1954, he married Mercader in 1959 in Mexico, but this union was not considered valid under Italian law. In 1968 he obtained French citizenship and married Mercader in Paris. Meanwhile, he had already had two sons with her: Manuel (1949–2014), a musician and composer, and Christian (b. 1951), who would follow his father's path as an actor and director. Only when Christian was 18 would the brothers find out they had a half-sister and started communication. Christian's son and Vittorio's grandson Brando De Sica continued the dynasty and became an actor and film director.

He was a Roman Catholic and a communist.

=== Death ===
De Sica died on 13 November 1974 after surgery due to lung cancer at the Neuilly-sur-Seine hospital in Paris.

== Legacy ==
Pauline Kael recalls:

When Shoeshine opened in 1947, I went to see it alone after one of those terrible lovers' quarrels that leave one in a state of incomprehensible despair. I came out of the theater, tears streaming, and overheard the petulant voice of a college girl complaining to her boyfriend, "Well I don't see what was so special about that movie." I walked up the street, crying blindly, no longer certain whether my tears were for the tragedy on the screen, the hopelessness I felt for myself, or the alienation I felt from those who could not experience the radiance of Shoeshine. For if people cannot feel Shoeshine, what can they feel? ... Later I learned that the man with whom I had quarreled had gone the same night and had also emerged in tears. Yet our tears for each other, and for Shoeshine, did not bring us together. Life, as Shoeshine demonstrates, is too complex for facile endings.

Kael quotes Orson Welles as saying: "In handling a camera I feel that I have no peer. But what De Sica can do, that I can't do. I ran his Shoeshine again recently and the camera disappeared, the screen disappeared, it was just life..."

Andre Bazin wrote "the Neapolitan charm of De Sica becomes, thanks to the cinema, the most sweeping message of love that our times have heard since Chaplin."

== Accolades ==
Vittorio De Sica was given the Interfilm Grand Prix in 1971 by the Berlin International Film Festival.

- Miracolo a Milano
  - Cannes Film Festival Palme d'Or Winner
- Umberto D.
  - Cannes Film Festival Official Selection
- Stazione Termini
  - Cannes Film Festival Official Selection
- L'oro di Napoli
  - Cannes Film Festival Official Selection
- Il Tetto
  - Cannes Film Festival OCIC Award Winner
- Anna di Brooklyn
  - Berlin International Film Festival Official Selection
- La Ciociara
  - Cannes Film Festival Official Selection
- Matrimonio all'italiana
  - Moscow International Film Festival Official Selection
- Il Giardino dei Finzi-Contini
  - Berlin International Film Festival Golden Bear Winner
  - Berlin International Film Festival Interfilm Award Winner – Otto Dibelius Film Award
- Nastro d'Argento for Best Director 1946 for Sciuscià
- Academy Award 1947 Honorary Award to the Italian production for Sciuscià (Shoeshine)
- Academy Award 1949 Special Foreign Language Film Award for Bicycle Thieves
- BAFTA (British Academy Award) 1950 Best film Bicycle Thieves
- Academy Award 1965 Best Foreign Language film for Ieri, oggi, domani (Yesterday, Today and Tomorrow)
- Academy Award 1972 Best Foreign Language film for Il giardino dei Finzi-Contini

== Bibliography ==
- Brancaleone, David (2021). Cesare Zavattini's Neo-realism and the Afterlife of an Idea: An Intellectual Biography. Bloomsbury Publishing USA. ISBN 9781501317002.
- Cardullo, Bert (2002). Vittorio De Sica: Director, Actor, Screenwriter. Jefferson, North Carolina: McFarland & Company. ISBN 078641135X.
- Curle, Howard; Snyder, Stephen (2000). Vittorio De Sica: Contemporary Perspectives. Toronto: University of Toronto Press. ISBN 080200654X.
- Curti, Roberto (2017). Italian Gothic Horror Films, 1970–1979. McFarland. ISBN 978-1476629605.
- Darretta, John (1 November 1983). Vittorio De Sica: a guide to references and resources. G.K. Hall. ISBN 978-0-8161-8468-2.
- Mallozzi, Giuseppe (2021). Vittorio De Sica: Visioni di Cinema Quaderni di Visioni Corte Film Festival vol. 2. Ali Ribelli. ISBN 9788833468778.
- Marrone, Gaetana (2007). Encyclopedia of Italian Literary Studies: A-J. Taylor & Francis. p. 621. ISBN 9781579583903.
- Sica, Vittorio De (1968). The Bicycle Thief: A Film. Simon & Schuster.
- Sica, Vittorio De; Zavattini, Cesare (1969). Miracle in Milan. Orion Press.
- Snyder, Stephen; Curle, Howard (1 January 2000). Vittorio De Sica: Contemporary Perspectives. University of Toronto Press. ISBN 978-0-8020-8381-4.
