= Commedia all'italiana =

Italian film genre

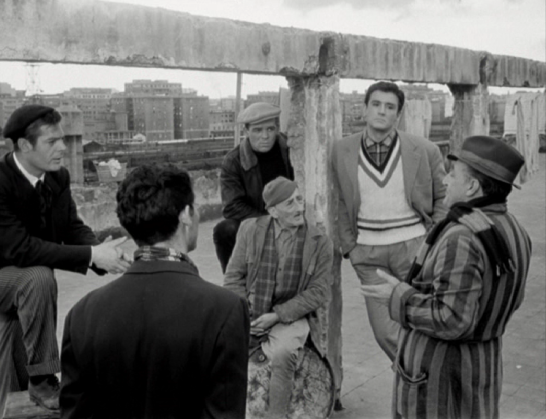
Big Deal on Madonna Street by Mario Monicelli (1958)

Commedia all'italiana (Italian: [komˈmɛːdja allitaˈljaːna]) or Italian-style comedy is an Italian film genre born in Italy in the 1950s and developed in the 1960s and 1970s. It is widely considered to have started with Mario Monicelli's Big Deal on Madonna Street in 1958, and derives its name from the title of Pietro Germi's Divorce Italian Style (1961). La Terrazza (1980) by Ettore Scola is considered to be the last work that is part of the commedia all'italiana.

Rather than a specific genre, the term indicates a period (approximately from the late 1950s to the early 1970s) in which the Italian film industry was producing many successful comedies, with some common traits like satire of manners, farcical and grotesque overtones, a strong focus on spicy social issues of the period (like sexual matters, divorce, contraception, marriage of the clergy, the economic rise of the country and its various consequences, the traditional religious influence of the Catholic Church in Italy) and a prevailing middle class setting, often characterized by a substantial background of sadness and social criticism that diluted the comic contents.

== Characteristics ==
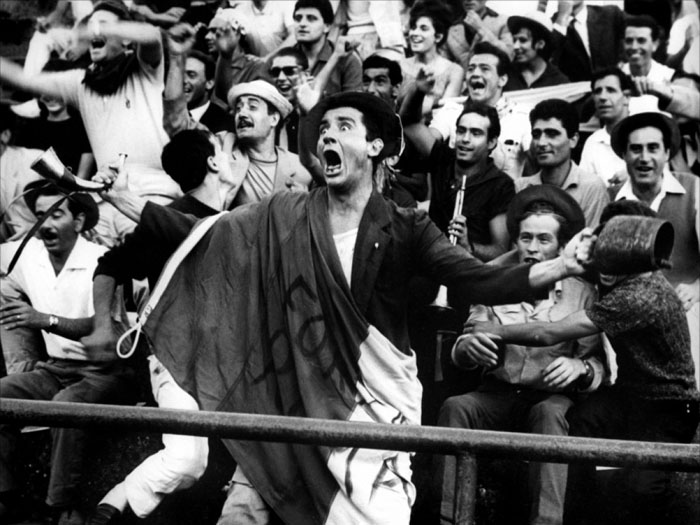
I mostri (1963) by Dino Risi

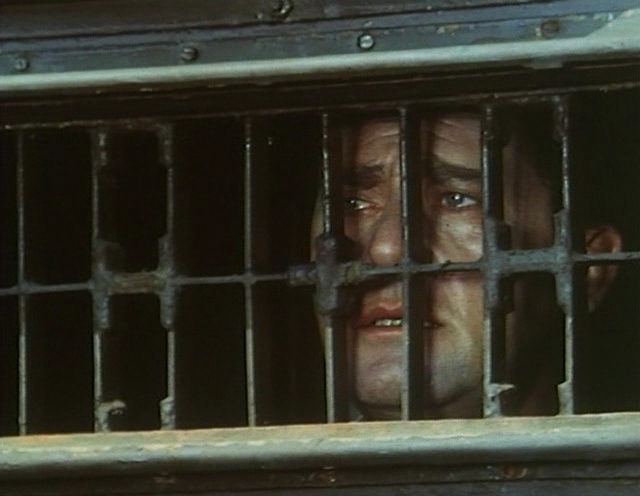
In Prison Awaiting Trial (1971) by Nanni Loy

The genre of commedia all'italiana differed markedly from the light and disengaged comedy of the so-called "pink neorealism" trend, in vogue during the 1950s, in its departure from neorealism's strict adherence to reality. Alongside the comic situations and plots typical of traditional comedy, it combined a biting and sometimes bitter satire of manners with irony to highlight the contradictions of contemporary Italian society. The setting was often Italy of the time period, although films that used different historical contexts to take aim at social current affairs were not uncommon.

From the end of the 1950s and throughout the 1970s, social changes affected the mentality and customs of Italians. The economic situation, student unrest and the search for new emancipations in the world of work and family, became the ideal context for comedy depicting those changes in civil society.

For Italy, these were a time of economic boom, in which radical change took place in the mentality and the sexual habits of the Italians, the birth of a new relationship with power and with religion, the search for new forms of economic and social emancipation, in the world of work, family and marriage, all themes that can be traced in the films belonging to this genre. During the 1970s, the commedia all'italiana touched on more complex social issues, with works with a basically dramatic background (for example, In Prison Awaiting Trial by Nanni Loy or An Average Little Man by Mario Monicelli).

The success of films belonging to the commedia all'italiana genre is due both to the presence of a generation of great actors, who knew how to masterfully embody the vices (many) and virtues (few), and the attempts at emancipation but also the vulgarities of the Italians of the time, and to the work of directors, storytellers and screenwriters, .

If one wanted to identify a manifesto of this kind, whose charm also rests, in part, on the vagueness of shared or in any case easily identifiable aesthetic canons, one could probably refer to three films out of all, I mostri by Dino Risi (with Vittorio Gassman and Ugo Tognazzi, who during the various episodes of the film are transformed into a series of grotesque characters), Be Sick... It's Free by Luigi Zampa, and its sequel Il Prof. Dott. Guido Tersilli, primario della clinica Villa Celeste, convenzionata con le mutue by Alberto Sordi, and Monicelli's Big Deal on Madonna Street, where Gassman is joined by Marcello Mastroianni, Totò, and a roundup of exceptional character actors. This last film, the first in chronological order among those mentioned (1958), is considered by many critics, due to its setting, themes, typology of characters and aesthetic settings, the starting point of the real commedia all'italiana.

== Directors and films ==
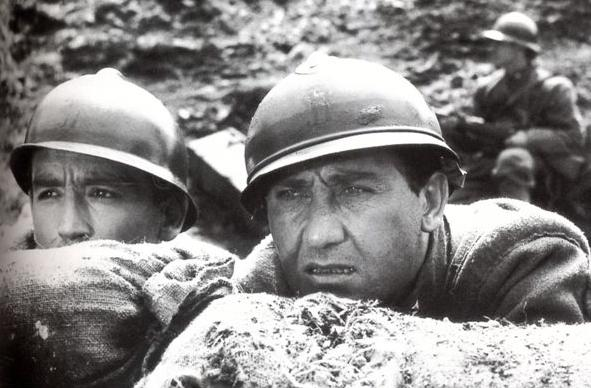
The Great War (1959) by Mario Monicelli

It is generally believed that it was the director Mario Monicelli, progenitor and among the greatest exponents (with Dino Risi, Luigi Comencini, Pietro Germi and Ettore Scola) of the commedia all'italiana, who inaugurated this new phase with the feature film Big Deal on Madonna Street (1958), written together with Suso Cecchi D'Amico and the screenwriting duo Agenore Incrocci and Furio Scarpelli. The work combines grotesque cues with sequences typical of underclass drama, filming with great detail a peripheral and degraded Rome, still extraneous to the economic processes of the Italian economic miracle. The film proved to be a success (even across borders) so much so that it was nominated for an Oscar as best foreign film.

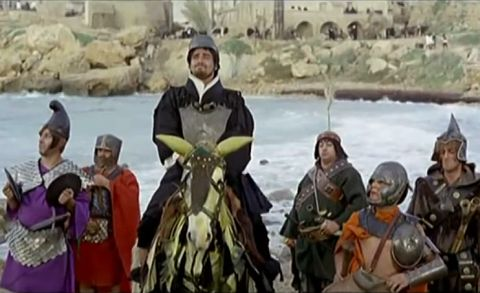
For Love and Gold by Mario Monicelli (1966)

In 1959, The Great War by Monicelli was released in theaters, with Alberto Sordi and Vittorio Gassman. The feature film, inspired by a story by Guy de Maupassant, contaminates historical tragedy with comedy modules, the massacres of World War I, taboo for all national cinema. After The Organizer (1963), Monicelli directed For Love and Gold (1966). The film is a mixture of fantasy and farcical adventures that unfold throughout an unbridled and carnivalesque Middle Ages, in clear controversy with the opposite vision of the middle age proposed by Hollywood cinema. Some time later, in full protest, he brought The Girl with the Pistol (1968) to the screens, sensing the comic qualities of the actress Monica Vitti. Among subsequent films by Monicelli are We Want the Colonels (1973), Come Home and Meet My Wife (1974), My friends (1975) and An Average Little Man (1977). The latter work is explicitly affected by the repressive climate of the Years of Lead and gives the actor Alberto Sordi one of his darkest and most suffered characters.

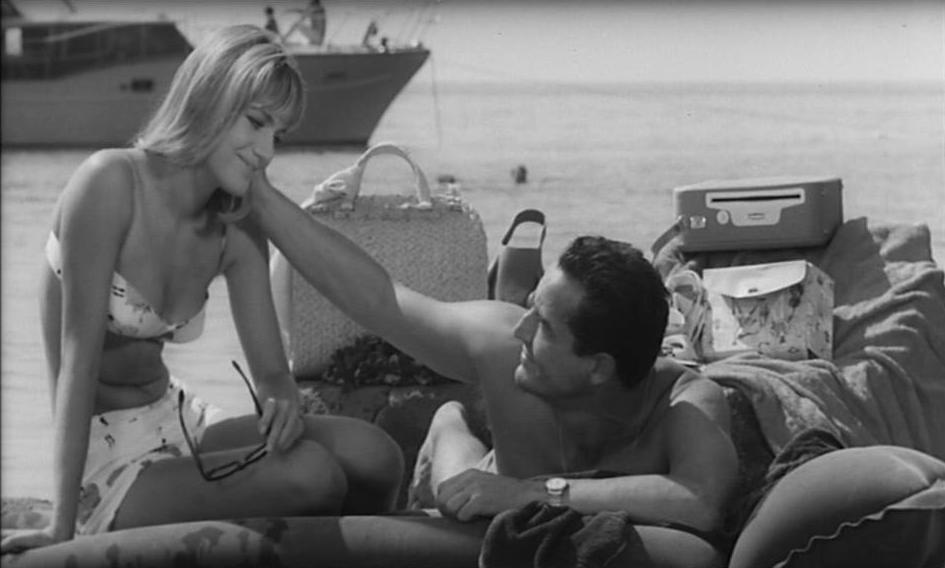
Il Sorpasso (1962) by Dino Risi

The 1960s was the period of the Italian economic miracle and consequently the cinema is affected by the changes that modify Italian society. One of the first artists to document these changes was the Milanese filmmaker Dino Risi. In his best known feature film Il Sorpasso (1962), the director mixes, with acute sensitivity, comedy and seriousness of the subject, veering, in an unusual way, in a dramatic and chilling ending. The histrionics of Vittorio Gassman and the soundtrack, with pieces by Edoardo Vianello and Domenico Modugno, photograph the picture of the time, making the comedy genre reach full authorial maturity. Also directed by Dino Risi is the cult movie I mostri (1963) and A Difficult Life (1961), which brings an intense Alberto Sordi to the scene. The film is an artistic document on post-war Italy and the nascent democracy, in a perfect balance between farce and drama, between sociological ambitions and political disillusionment. Other works worth mentioning are Il vedovo (1959), Il Mattatore (1960), The Thursday (1964), Weekend, Italian Style (1965), Torture Me But Kill Me with Kisses (1968), In the Name of the Italian People (1971) and the film Scent of a Woman (1974), fully supported by the acting verve of Vittorio Gassman.

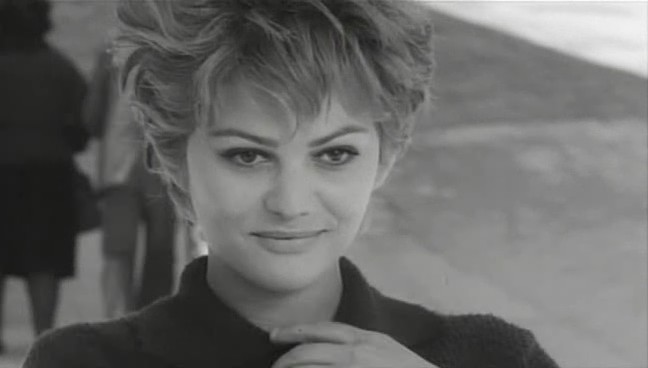
La ragazza di Bube (1963) by Luigi Comencini

It should be highlighted how often the constituent elements of comedy have been artfully intertwined with different genres, giving rise to decidedly unclassifiable films. In inaugurating this technique, the filmmaker Luigi Comencini was undoubtedly one of the most important authors. After having achieved popularity in the 1950s with some pink comedies (among all the well-known Bread, Love and Dreams 1953), in 1960 he gave Italian cinema the war opera Everybody Go Home. The feature film, constantly poised between humor and drama, reconstructs the days following the Armistice of Cassibile, helping to break the wall of silence that had fallen on the Italian Civil War, a topic hitherto ignored by a large part of national cinema. Among his best works are On the Tiger's Back (1961), La ragazza di Bube (1963), The Scientific Cardplayer (1972), the drama The Adventures of Pinocchio (1972), The Cat (1978) and Traffic Jam (1979), in which different genres and styles merge.

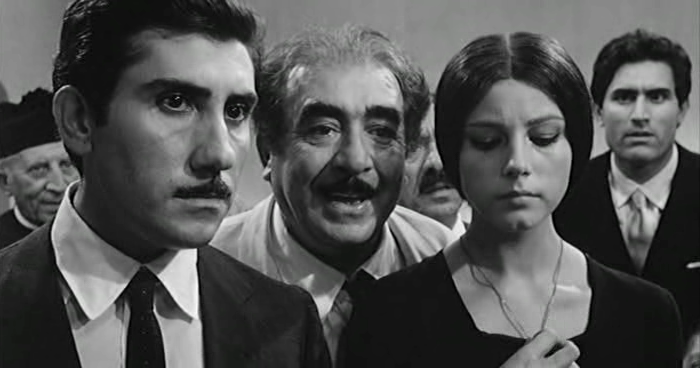
Seduced and Abandoned by Pietro Germi (1964)

Another leading figure for the development and imposition of the commedia all'italiana is the director Pietro Germi. After having ventured into works with an evident civil content, somehow attributable to the canons of neorealism, in the last phase of his career he directed films that could be inserted within the range of comedy, where components of criticism survive alongside the usual humorous tones on the customs of the middle class. The already mentioned Divorce Italian Style opened the doors to Germi's success which materialized with Seduced and Abandoned (1964) and with the clear and caustic The Birds, the Bees and the Italians (1965). The film (a satire on the bourgeois hypocrisy of a small town in the upper Veneto region) won the Palme d'Or at the Cannes Film Festival equal to A Man and a Woman (1966) by Claude Lelouch.

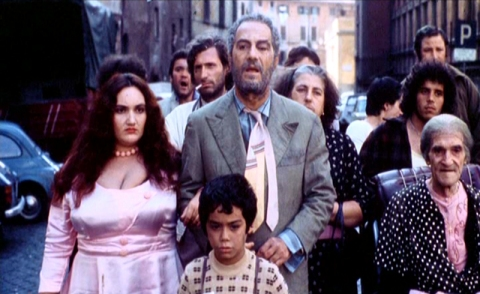
Ugly, Dirty and Bad by Ettore Scola (1976)

The latest protagonist of the great season of comedy was the Roman director Ettore Scola. Throughout the 1950s, he played the role of screenwriter, to then make his directorial debut in 1964 with the film Let's Talk About Women. In 1974 he directed his best-known film, We All Loved Each Other So Much, which retraces 30 years of Italian history through the stories of three friends: the lawyer Gianni Perego (Vittorio Gassman), the porter Antonio (Nino Manfredi) and the intellectual Nicola (Stefano Satta Flores). Other important films are Ugly, Dirty and Bad (1976), led by Nino Manfredi, and A Special Day (1977), where Sophia Loren and Marcello Mastroianni give one of their most high and poignant performances.

In 1980, the director sums up the commedia all'italiana in the generational pamphlet of La terrazza, which effectively describes the bitter existential balance sheet of a group of left-wing intellectuals. According to most of the critics, the film is the last work still attributable to the commedia all'italiana.

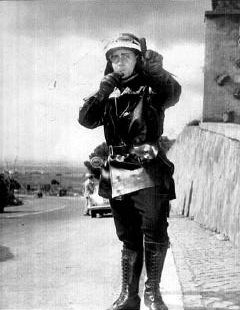
The Traffic Policeman by Luigi Zampa (1960)

A separate place is occupied by Antonio Pietrangeli, who in almost all of his films has dealt with female psychology, outlining portraits of unhappy and tormented women with marked sensitivity, from Adua and Her Friends (1960) to La visita (1963), from The Girl from Parma (1963) to I Knew Her Well (1965), considered his masterpiece. Other significant works are the timeless The Traffic Policeman (1960) and Be Sick... It's Free (1968) by Luigi Zampa, Crimen (1961) by Mario Camerini, Leoni al sole (1961) by Vittorio Caprioli, To Bed or Not to Bed (1963) by Gian Luigi Polidoro, as well as some comedies by Vittorio De Sica, such as Il Boom (1963), Yesterday, Today and Tomorrow (1963) and Marriage Italian Style (1964).

Between the 1960s and 1970s, the cinema of Luciano Salce, author of many comedies with guaranteed box-office receipts, became famous. In addition to the comic cycle of films based on the adventures of the accountant Ugo Fantozzi, we can mention The Fascist (1961), Crazy Desire (1962), The Hours of Love (1963) and Duck in Orange Sauce (1975), all enriched by the recitative flair of Ugo Tognazzi. Also is Franco Brusati's film Bread and Chocolate (1973), which revisits the various problems of Italian diaspora with biting intelligence, aided in this by the incisive interpretation of Nino Manfredi. Brusati himself directed To Forget Venice (1979).

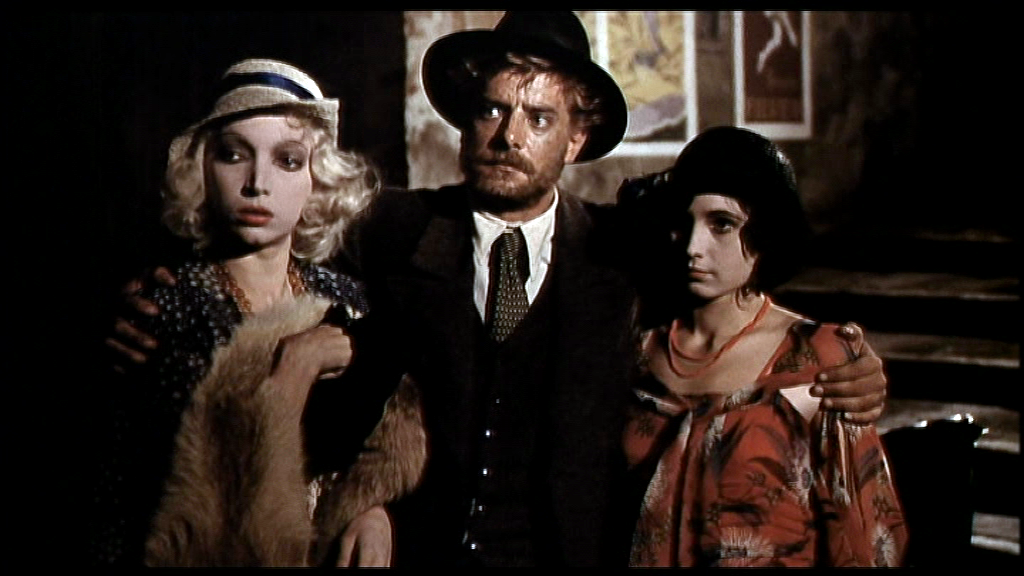
Love and Anarchy (1973) by Lina Wertmüller

Also in this context, the work done by the director Lina Wertmüller, who together with the experienced couple of actors Giancarlo Giannini and Mariangela Melato gave life, in the first half of the 1970s, to successful films among The Seduction of Mimi (1972), Love and Anarchy (1973) and Swept Away (1974). Two years later, with Seven Beauties (1976), she obtained four Academy Awards nominations, making her the first woman ever to receive a nomination for best director.

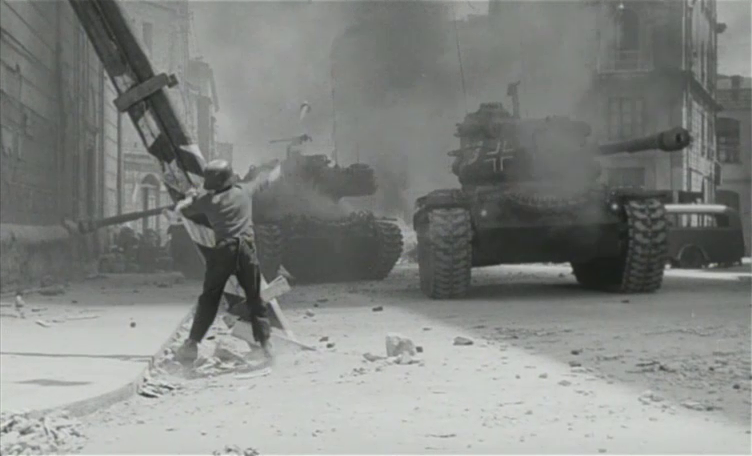
The Four Days of Naples (1962) by Nanni Loy

Of note is the artistic product of Sergio Citti, who along the lines of certain Pasolinian cinema directs bizarre and surreal comedies, achieving convincing results in more than one film among which are Ostia (1970), Beach House (1977) and Il minestrone (1981). Other directors worth mentioning are Nanni Loy for the film The Four Days of Naples (1962), Steno in the successful film Febbre da cavallo (1976), Sergio Corbucci, Salvatore Samperi, Gianni Puccini and Marcello Fondato. Others are Pasquale Festa Campanile, Luigi Filippo D'Amico, Tonino Cervi, Flavio Mogherini, Franco Rossi and Luigi Magni, who in his small but significant production, outlined comedies set in papal and Risorgimento Rome that often saw Nino Manfredi as the leading actor.

== Actors and actresses ==
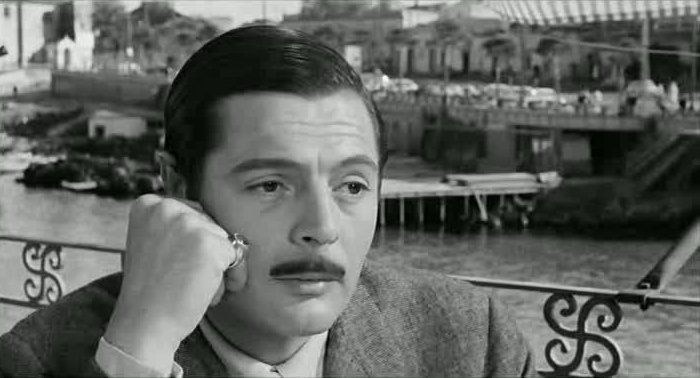
Divorce Italian Style (1961) by Pietro Germi

Among the forerunners of the commedia all'italiana are certainly two of the great actors of the 20th century, Aldo Fabrizi, who anticipated the genre with some successful films of the early 1950s, and Totò, forerunner of the commedia all'italiana with the popular trend of "Totò e Peppino" in which another famous actor of Neapolitan comedy appeared as a sidekick, Peppino De Filippo. The two actors, in addition to playing leading roles in a large number of feature films of the genre, left an indelible mark, as guests of honor, in some masterpieces of the time. Totò for example, in Big Deal on Madonna Street (1958) and Peppino de Filippo in Fellini's episode The Temptations of Doctor Antonio in Boccaccio '70 (1962).

Among the actors, in addition to Totò and Aldo Fabrizi, the main representatives are Alberto Sordi, Ugo Tognazzi, Vittorio Gassman, Marcello Mastroianni and Nino Manfredi, while among the actresses is Monica Vitti. However, there are numerous high-level interpreters working in the genre. Among these are Sophia Loren, Gina Lollobrigida, Claudia Cardinale, Vittorio De Sica, Franco and Ciccio, Raimondo Vianello, Gino Cervi, Walter Chiari, Aroldo Tieri, Franca Valeri, Stefania Sandrelli, Gastone Moschin, Silvana Mangano, Carla Gravina, Adolfo Celi, Carlo Giuffrè, Aldo Giuffrè and Lando Buzzanca.

Subsequently (from the end of the 1960s and the beginning of the following decade), Paolo Villaggio, Gigi Proietti, Giancarlo Giannini, Michele Placido, Laura Antonelli, Stefano Satta Flores, Mariangela Melato, as well as a number of character actors and supporting cast, among which are Gianni Agus, Tiberio Murgia, Carlo Pisacane (better known as "Capannelle"), Renato Salvatori, Mario Carotenuto, Memmo Carotenuto, Tina Pica, Marisa Merlini, Ave Ninchi, Carlo Delle Piane, Leopoldo Trieste, Giacomo Furia, Luigi Pavese and Raffaele Pisu. Even great actors who tend to be dramatic, such as Gian Maria Volonté, Enrico Maria Salerno and Salvo Randone, have sometimes successfully ventured into commedia all'italiana. There are also many foreign performers who have often been protagonists or co-stars in films belonging to the commedia all'italiana genre, including Catherine Spaak, Louis de Funès, Fernandel, Sylva Koscina, Bernard Blier, Mario Adorf, Tomas Milian, Philippe Noiret, Senta Berger, Jean-Louis Trintignant, Claudine Auger, Ann-Margret and Dustin Hoffman.

== Settings ==
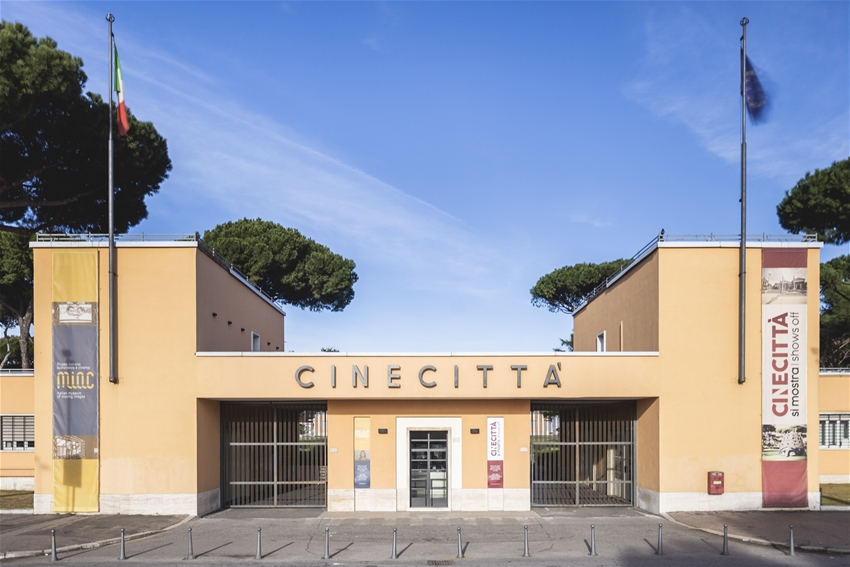
Entrance to the Cinecittà in Rome, the largest film studio in Europe

The commedia all'italiana was a creation of Cinecittà and initially was often set in Rome, with Roman actors or, even more often, Roman by adoption (for example, Vittorio Gassman, born in Genoa, moved to Rome at a very young age, Ugo Tognazzi, from Cremona, took his first steps in the avanspettacolo of the capital, Marcello Mastroianni and Nino Manfredi, both originally from the province of Frosinone, trained artistically in Rome). After all, Italian public life of the time was mainly centered in the capital, where Via Veneto, with its cafés frequented by artists, actors, adventurers and photographers (the so-called paparazzi), who made the social life of the Capitoline beau monde famous throughout the world.

Throughout the 1950s, Milan was perceived more as a center of business than of worldly events, only to return to a leading role with the Italian economic miracle of the 1960s. The Roman actor Alberto Sordi, who participated in over 140 cinematographic works, ended up embodying his city of origin, portraying a vast range of characters representing situations and societal issues.

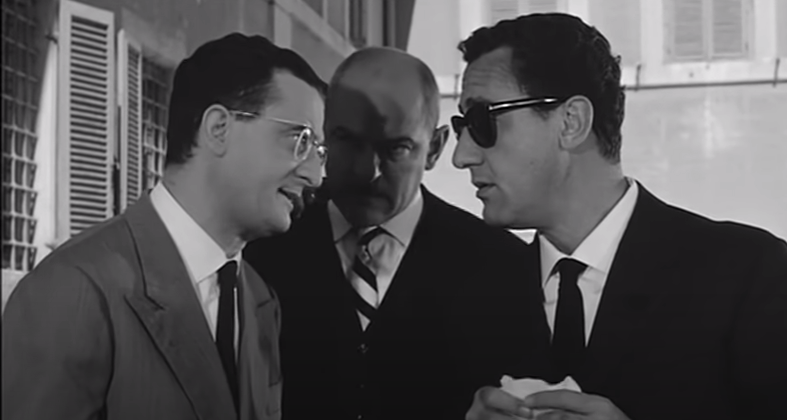
Il vedovo by Dino Risi (1959), set in Milan

However, although the Roman setting was very frequent, the genre always represented Italian society in its most different facets and many films attributable to the genre were therefore set in other important Italian urban realities (for example Naples in Seven Beauties and Treasure of San Gennaro, Florence in My Friends, Milan in Il vedovo and Come Home and Meet My Wife) or in the microcosm of the small Italian province (for example Veneto in Police Chief Pepe and The Birds, the Bees and the Italians, Sicily in Divorce Italian Style, the Lombard town of Vigevano in The Teacher from Vigevano and the Marche village of Sacrofante Marche in Torture Me But Kill Me with Kisses and the Ascoli Piceno in Alfredo, Alfredo).

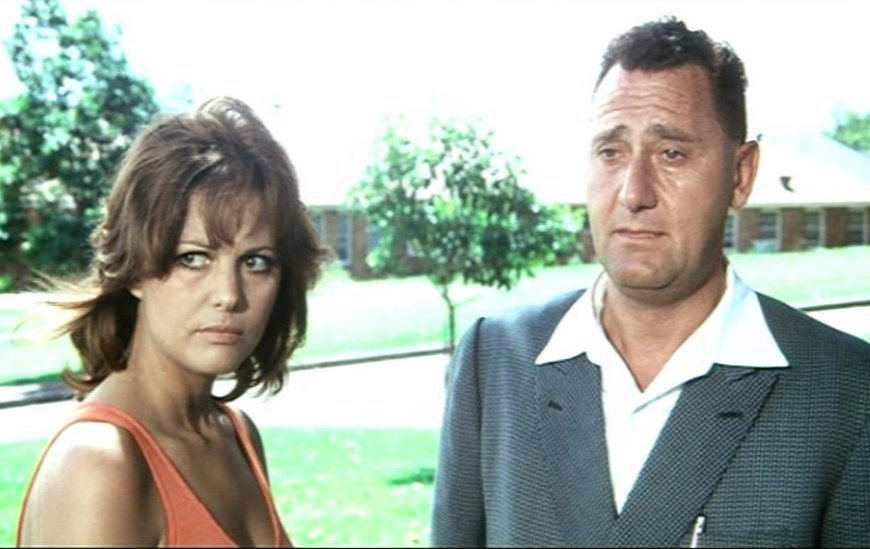
A scene from the film A Girl in Australia (1971) by Luigi Zampa, focused on the Italian diaspora

Since the 1960s, there have also been numerous films portraying Italians struggling with the rest of the world, starting with the figures of emigrants abroad during the Italian diaspora. Nino Manfredi played an immigrant to Switzerland in Bread and Chocolate and Alberto Sordi played an immigrant to Australia in A Girl in Australia. Italians abroad find themselves, in the most diverse situations, also in The Girl with the Pistol, Will Our Heroes Be Able to Find Their Friend Who Has Mysteriously Disappeared in Africa?, To Bed or Not to Bed, Fumo di Londra, An Italian in America, Run for Your Wife, My Brother Anastasia, and many others.

Comedies in which the Italian setting is transposed into different historical contexts are also not infrequent. From the Middle Ages by Mario Monicelli in For Love and Gold and Brancaleone at the Crusades, to the papal Rome of the Risorgimento by Luigi Magni in The Conspirators and In the Name of the Pope King, to the numerous films that portray Italians grappling with the ups and downs over the years of the fascist regime and World War II, such as The Fascist, Roaring Years, We All Loved Each Other So Much, The Two Marshals, Everybody Go Home, or even Polvere di stelle, the story of a shabby avanspettacolo company struggling with the upheavals of the Badoglio Proclamation, and many other films.

== Success and decline ==
=== The rise of a successful genre ===
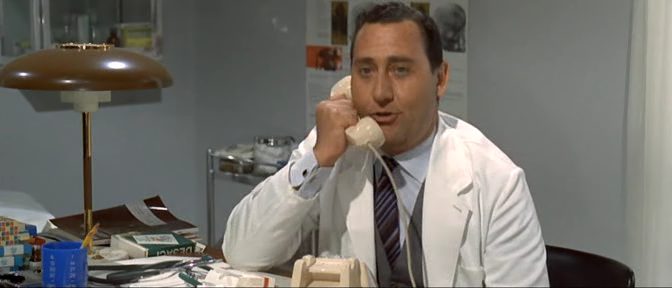
Be Sick... It's Free (1968) by Luigi Zampa

The genre had great success for over 20 years, from the end of the 1950s to the end of the 1970s. In its climax, especially around the second half of the 1960s, the best commedie all'italiana frequently found themselves at the top of the box office charts, not only in Italy, but also in various other European countries. The success in some cases was such that it allowed actors such as Sophia Loren, Walter Chiari, Vittorio Gassman, Gina Lollobrigida, Virna Lisi to attempt cinematic experiences in Hollywood as well. In fact, the genre, together with neorealism and spaghetti Westerns, was the only one that could be successfully exported and also appreciated abroad, despite the fact that the situations and contexts represented were sometimes so typically "Italian" as not to always be fully perceived by the foreign public.

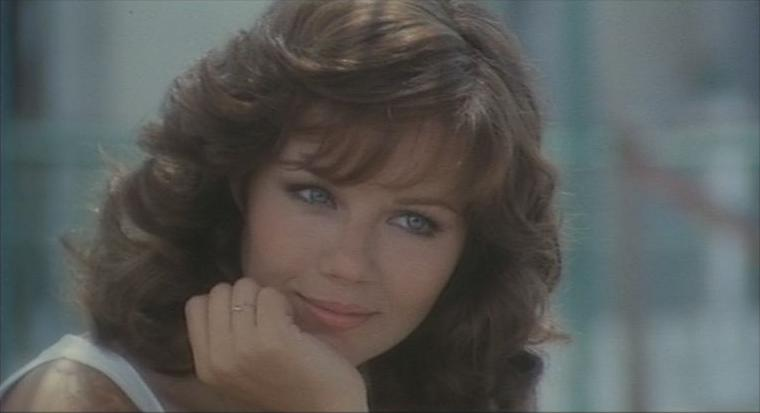
Scent of a Woman (1974) by Dino Risi. An American remake, Scent of a Woman, was released in 1992.

In some cases, due to the particular themes dealt with, even of significant social relevance, some commedie all'italiana not only caused a stir at the time, but even contributed to animating the debate on the proposed themes. This is the case, for example, of Be Sick... It's Free, on the mechanisms of the Italian health system, or In Prison Awaiting Trial, on the judicial and prison system, or Divorce Italian Style, on the law concerning crimes of honour.

Even after many years, even Hollywood has rediscovered some commedie all'italiana, making more or less successful remakes of them. This is the case, for example, of Once upon a Crime by Eugene Levy, a remake of Crimen by Mario Camerini, or Crackers by Louis Malle and Welcome to Collinwood by Russo brothers, with George Clooney, both remakes of Big Deal on Madonna Street, or Swept Away by Guy Ritchie, remake of Swept Away by Lina Wertmüller, as well as the more famous Scent of a Woman by Martin Brest, starring Al Pacino, remake of Scent of a Woman by Dino Risi.

=== The decline ===
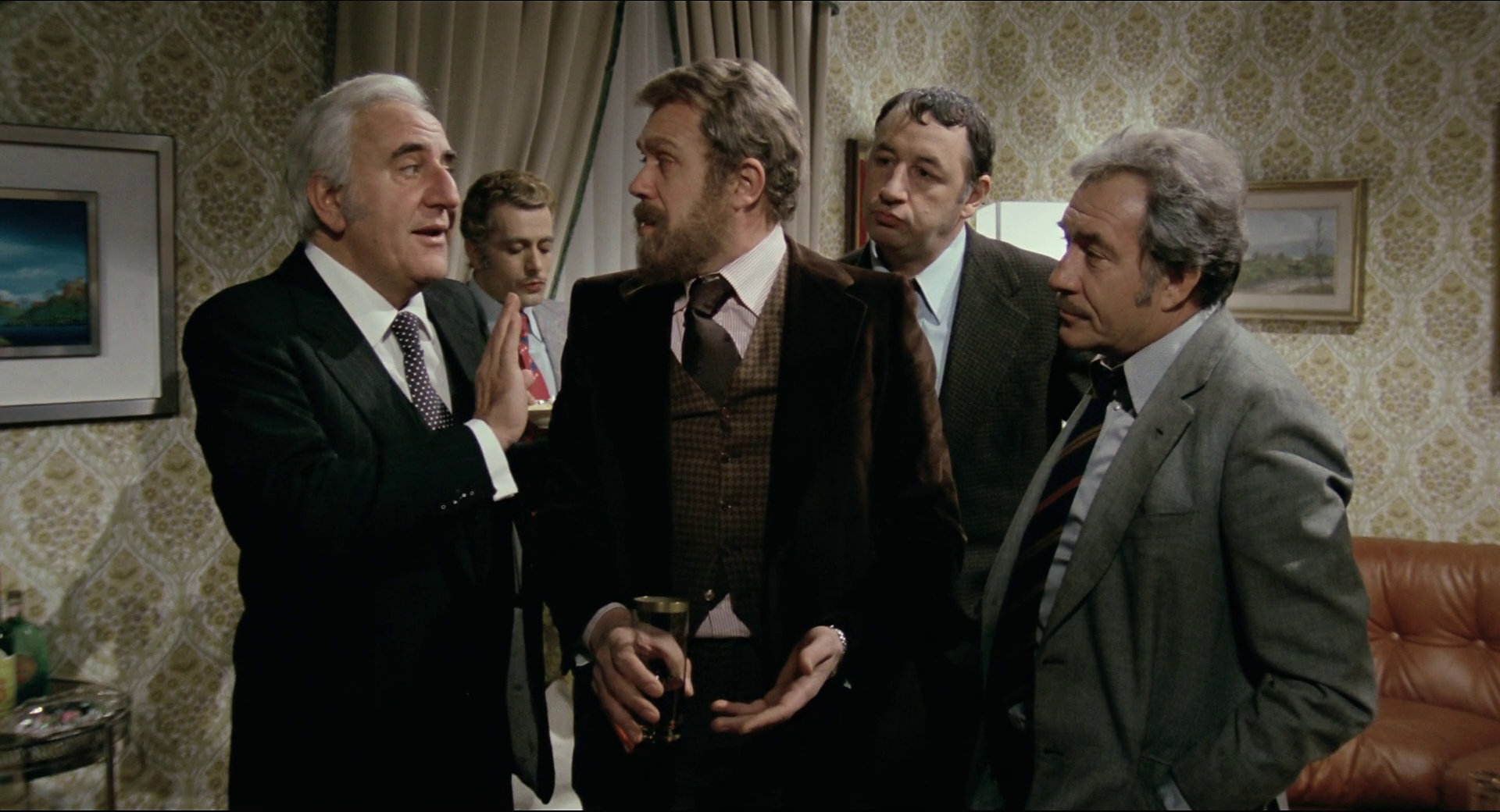
My Friends by Mario Monicelli (1975)

After the great public successes and critical acknowledgments, the commedia all'italiana genre began to decline around the end of the 1970s, to run out almost completely at the beginning of the following decade. Due to the disappearance, in those years and in the immediate period precedent, of some of its most charismatic protagonists (this is the case, for example, of Vittorio De Sica, Totò, Peppino De Filippo, Pietro Germi, Antonio Pietrangeli, Gino Cervi, Tina Pica, Camillo Mastrocinque), the inevitable aging of a whole generation of directors and actors who had been the architect in the first years and, above all, the changing socio-economic and political conditions of Italy at the time.

The progressive escalation of social and political conflict in Italy in the 1970s, with the eruption of terrorism, the economic crisis, and a widespread sense of insecurity, in fact ended up extinguishing that drive towards an ironic smile which had been the dominant feature of the commedia all'italiana in the best years, replaced little by little by an ever more crude and dramatic vision of reality.

Already in 1975, Mario Monicelli, with his My Friends, gave a fundamental turning point to comedy in this sense as the happy ending and the light ending definitively disappear, the characters remain comical but become bitter and pathetic, in an atmosphere of general bitterness and disenchantment. Even further, between 1977 and 1980, some of the best films of the period seem to go, such as An Average Little Man or La terrazza, considered by many critics to be among the last fully attributable in the genre of commedia all'italiana, which they mark a rather decisive inversion from the comic to the dramatic in the first case, and from the comic to a bitter historical-cultural reflection in the second. La terrazza in particular, from 1980, constitutes according to most of the critics last works still attributable to the commedia all'italiana.

== Aftermath ==
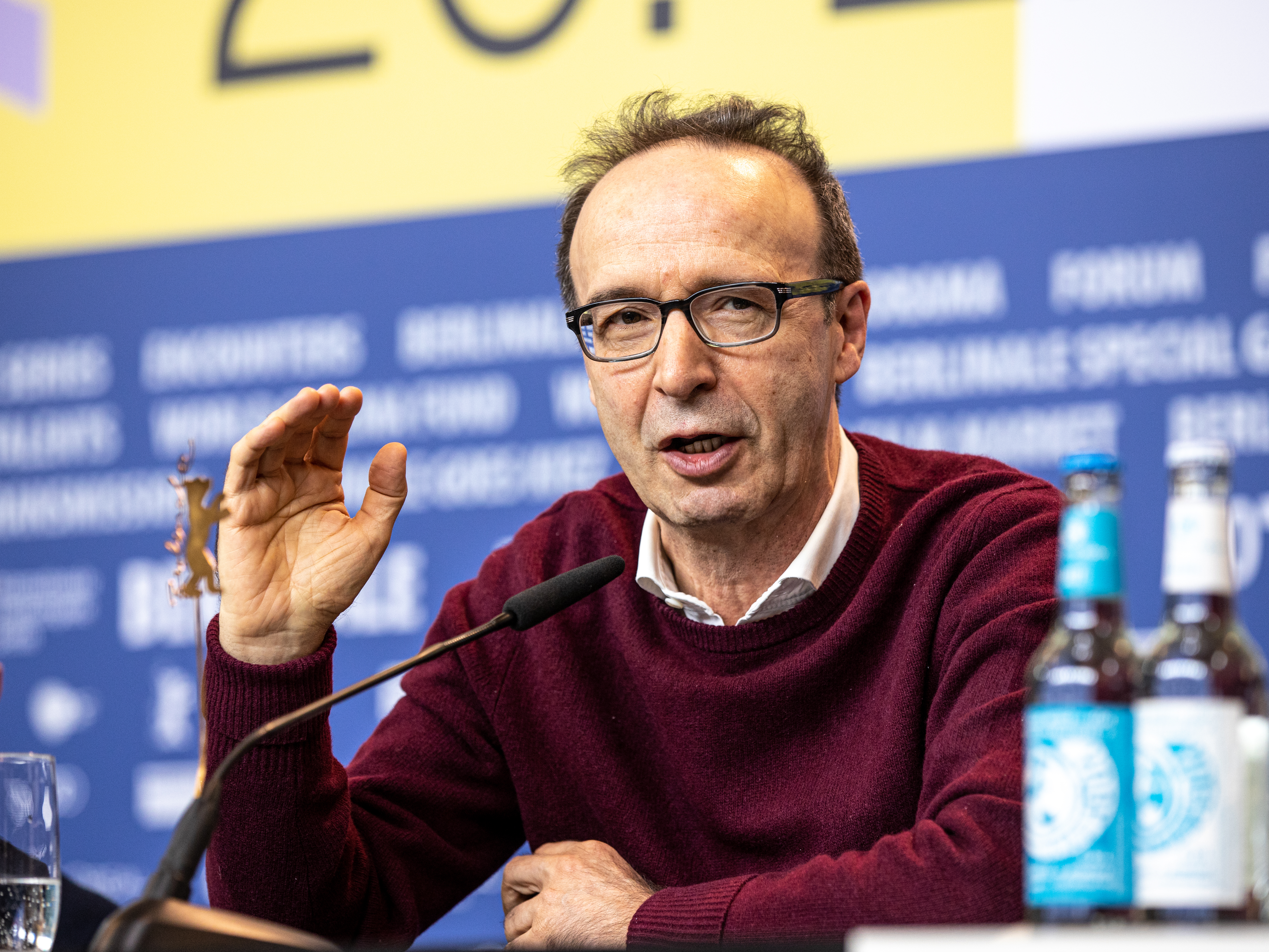
Roberto Benigni

The genre of commedia all'italiana in a broad sense, albeit with characteristics that are by now profoundly different from those of the 1950s and 1970s, found its place in the Italian film scene in the early 1980s with filmmakers such as Carlo Verdone, Nanni Moretti, Maurizio Nichetti, Roberto Benigni, Francesco Nuti, Alessandro Benvenuti and Massimo Troisi. Starting from the 1990s, feature films by Gabriele Salvatores, Paolo Virzì, Francesca Archibugi, Daniele Luchetti and Silvio Soldini, joined by more disengaged comedies such as those by Leonardo Pieraccioni, Vincenzo Salemme, Giovanni Veronesi and others. These artists represent the ideal heirs of the film genre, even if for the majority of critics the true and proper commedia all'italiana is to be considered by now definitively waned since the beginning of the 1980s, giving way, at most, to a commedia italiana ("Italian comedy"). The stylistic differences between the various filmmakers would be excessive, such as to be able to trace a common school, and the socio-cultural conditions with which current Italian cinema is confronted are too different by now, for one to think to a continuity with the period in which this genre was born and developed (1958–1980). It is no coincidence that the very term commedia all'italiana now unanimously identifies an era which, with rare exceptions, does not go beyond the early 1980s, so much so that, from then on, it has almost never been used by critics and journalists to tag newly produced comedies.

== Notable films ==
Title	Year	Director	Notable actors
Big Deal on Madonna Street	1958	Mario Monicelli	Marcello Mastroianni, Vittorio Gassman, Totò
The Great War	1959	Mario Monicelli	Vittorio Gassman, Alberto Sordi, Silvana Mangano
Il vedovo	1959	Dino Risi	Alberto Sordi, Franca Valeri
Il Mattatore	1959	Dino Risi	Vittorio Gassman
Everybody Go Home	1960	Luigi Comencini	Alberto Sordi
Adua and Her Friends	1960	Antonio Pietrangeli	Simone Signoret, Marcello Mastroianni, Sandra Milo
A Difficult Life	1961	Dino Risi	Alberto Sordi
Fiasco in Milan	1961	Nanni Loy	Vittorio Gassman, Claudia Cardinale, Nino Manfredi
The Fascist	1961	Luciano Salce	Ugo Tognazzi, Stefania Sandrelli
Divorce, Italian Style	1962	Pietro Germi	Marcello Mastroianni, Stefania Sandrelli
Boccaccio '70	1962	Mario Monicelli, Federico Fellini, Luchino Visconti, Vittorio De Sica	Sophia Loren, Anita Ekberg, Peppino De Filippo, Marisa Solinas, Romy Schneider, Thomas Milian, Romolo Valli
The Easy Life	1962	Dino Risi	Vittorio Gassman, Catherine Spaak
The Last Judgement	1962	Vittorio De Sica	Vittorio Gassman, Nino Manfredi
Mafioso	1962	Alberto Lattuada	Alberto Sordi
March on Rome	1962	Dino Risi	Vittorio Gassman, Ugo Tognazzi
The Conjugal Bed	1963	Marco Ferreri	Ugo Tognazzi, Marina Vlady
I mostri	1963	Dino Risi	Vittorio Gassman, Ugo Tognazzi
High Infidelity	1965	Mario Monicelli, Franco Rossi, Elio Petri, Luciano Salce	Ugo Tognazzi, Nino Manfredi
To Bed or Not to Bed	1963	Gian Luigi Polidoro	Alberto Sordi
Il Boom	1963	Vittorio De Sica	Alberto Sordi
Yesterday, Today and Tomorrow	1963	Vittorio De Sica	Marcello Mastroianni, Sophia Loren
The Reunion	1963	Damiano Damiani	
Seduced and Abandoned	1964	Pietro Germi	Stefania Sandrelli
Let's Talk About Women	1965	Ettore Scola	Vittorio Gassman
Il successo	1965	Mauro Morassi, Dino Risi	Vittorio Gassman, Anouk Aimée
Le bambole	1965	Mauro Bolognini, Luigi Comencini, Dino Risi, Franco Rossi	Nino Manfredi
Casanova 70	1965	Mario Monicelli	Marcello Mastroianni, Virna Lisi, Enrico Maria Salerno
The Birds, the Bees and the Italians	1965	Pietro Germi	Virna Lisi
I complessi	1965	Dino Risi, Luigi Filippo D'Amico, Franco Rossi	Nino Manfredi, Ugo Tognazzi, Alberto Sordi
The Gaucho	1965	Dino Risi	Vittorio Gassman, Silvana Pampanini, Nino Manfredi
I Knew Her Well	1965	Antonio Pietrangeli	Stefania Sandrelli, Ugo Tognazzi, Nino Manfredi, Enrico Maria Salerno
The Man, the Woman and the Money	1965	Eduardo De Filippo, Marco Ferreri, Luciano Salce	Marcello Mastroianni
Me, Me, Me... and the Others	1966	Alessandro Blasetti	
For Love and Gold	1966	Mario Monicelli	Vittorio Gassman, Enrico Maria Salerno, Gian Maria Volonté
Weekend, Italian Style	1966	Dino Risi	Sandra Milo, Enrico Maria Salerno, Jean Sorel
A Question of Honour	1966	Luigi Zampa	Ugo Tognazzi
The Tiger and the Pussycat	1967	Dino Risi	Vittorio Gassman
The Witches	1967	Luchino Visconti, Pier Paolo Pasolini, Vittorio De Sica, Franco Rossi, Mauro Bolognini	Silvana Mangano, Clint Eastwood, Annie Girardot, Totò, Alberto Sordi
The Girl with the Pistol	1968	Mario Monicelli	Monica Vitti
Be Sick... It's Free	1968	Luigi Zampa	Alberto Sordi
The Libertine	1968	Pasquale Festa Campanile	Catherine Spaak
Police Chief Pepe	1969	Ettore Scola	Ugo Tognazzi
I See Naked	1969	Dino Risi	Nino Manfredi, Sylva Koscina
Brancaleone at the Crusades	1970	Mario Monicelli	Vittorio Gassman
Between Miracles	1971	Nino Manfredi	Nino Manfredi, Mariangela Melato
In the Name of the Italian People	1971	Dino Risi	Ugo Tognazzi, Vittorio Gassman, Ugo Tognazzi
Secret Fantasy	1971	Pasquale Festa Campanile	Laura Antonelli
A Girl in Australia	1971	Luigi Zampa	Alberto Sordi, Claudia Cardinale
The Seduction of Mimi	1972	Lina Wertmüller	Giancarlo Giannini, Mariangela Melato
The Scientific Cardplayer	1972	Luigi Comencini	Alberto Sordi, Silvana Mangano
We Want the Colonels	1973	Mario Monicelli	Ugo Tognazzi
Bread and Chocolate	1973	Franco Brusati	Nino Manfredi
We All Loved Each Other So Much	1974	Ettore Scola	Vittorio Gassman, Nino Manfredi, Stefania Sandrelli
Swept Away	1974	Lina Wertmüller	Giancarlo Giannini, Mariangela Melato
Scent of a Woman	1974	Dino Risi	Vittorio Gassman
Come Home and Meet My Wife	1974	Mario Monicelli	Ugo Tognazzi, Ornella Muti
My Friends	1975	Mario Monicelli	Ugo Tognazzi, Adolfo Celi
Ugly, Dirty and Bad	1976	Ettore Scola	Nino Manfredi
The Career of a Chambermaid	1976	Dino Risi	Vittorio Gassman, Ugo Tognazzi
The Bishop's Bedroom	1977	Dino Risi	Ugo Tognazzi
An Average Little Man	1977	Mario Monicelli	Alberto Sordi
Traffic Jam	1977	Luigi Comencini	Alberto Sordi, Marcello Mastroianni, Ugo Tognazzi, Stefania Sandrelli
Goodnight, Ladies and Gentlemen	1976	Luigi Comencini, Nanni Loy, Mario Monicelli, Ettore Scola, Luigi Magni	Vittorio Gassman, Ugo Tognazzi, Nino Manfredi, Marcello Mastroianni
Dear Father	1979	Dino Risi	Vittorio Gassman
Café Express	1980	Nanni Loy	Nino Manfredi
La terrazza	1980	Ettore Scola	Marcello Mastroianni, Vittorio Gassman, Ugo Tognazzi

== See also ==
- Cinema of Italy
- Commedia sexy all'italiana
- Italian neorealism

== Bibliography ==
- Lanzoni, Rémi Fournier (2009). Comedy Italian Style: The Golden Age of Italian Film Comedies. Continuum. ISBN 978-0-8264-1822-7.
- Bini, Andrea (2015). Male Anxiety and Psychopathology in Film: Comedy Italian Style. Palgrave Macmillan. ISBN 978-1137516886.
