= Erminia Ferrari =

Italian model and costume designer (1931–2026)

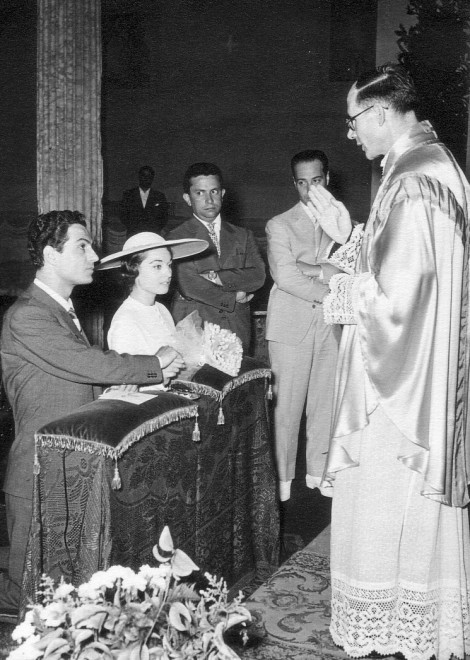
- Ferrari at her wedding with Nino Manfredi in 1955
- Born: 4 November 1931; Taormina, Italy
- Died: 2 November 2026 (aged 94); Rome, Italy
- Occupations: Model; Costume designer

Erminia Ferrari (4 November 1931 – 2 November 2026) was an Italian model and costume designer.

The daughter of a hotel director in the Italian colonies of Libya and Ethiopia, she moved to Rome in 1950 to do modeling under Roberto Capucci. On 14 July 1955, she married actor Nino Manfredi; the couple remained married until his death in 2004. She worked as a costume designer for many of her husband's films. In the 1992 parliamentary election, she ran for a seat in the Chamber of Deputies under the Pannella List banner in the Province of Frosinone, winning only 1157 votes, or 0.79%. In April 2006, she became honorary president of the association Viva la Vita, which raised money for people suffering from amytrophic lateral sclerosis.

Ferrari died in Rome on 2 November 2026, at the age of 94.

== Costume designs in films ==
- A Dangerous Toy (1979)
- Café Express (1980)
- Portrait of a Woman, Nude (1981)
- Spaghetti House (1982)
