= Franco Brusati =

Italian screenwriter and director

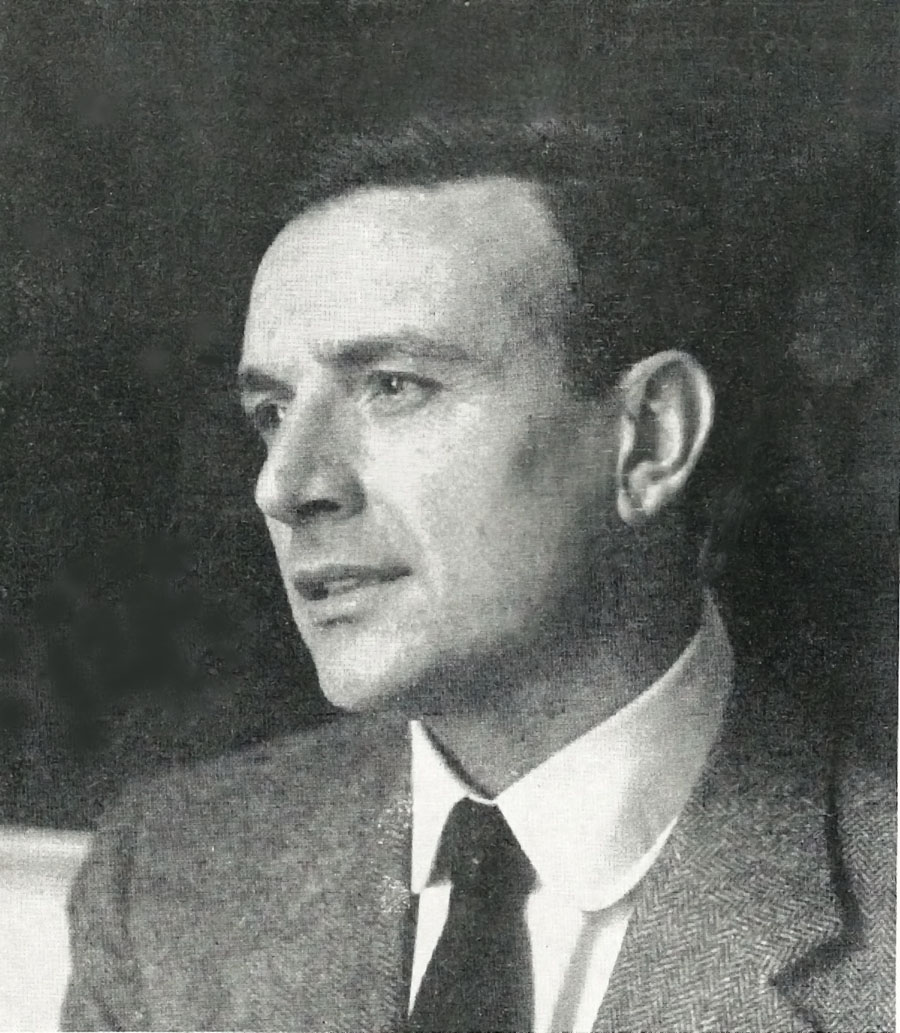
- Franco Brusati c. 1964
- Born: 4 August 1922; Milan, Kingdom of Italy
- Died: 28 February 1993 (aged 70); Rome, Italy
- Resting place: Cimitero Monumentale di Milano
- Education: University of Geneva; University of Milan
- Occupations: Screenwriter; Director; Playwright
- Years active: 1948–1989
- Awards: David di Donatello for Best Film; 1974 Bread and Chocolate; 1979 To Forget Venice
- Website: francobrusati.com

Franco Brusati (4 August 1922 in Milan – 28 February 1993 in Rome) was an Italian screenwriter and director.

== Biography ==
He directed the internationally commended film hit Bread and Chocolate, one of the finest examples of Commedia all'italiana films in the 1970s.

In 1979, his film To Forget Venice was nominated for an Academy Award for Best International Feature Film at the 52nd Academy Awards. In Italy, the film was awarded the David di Donatello for Best Film.

In 1983, Brusati was a member of the jury at the 33rd Berlin International Film Festival.

== Filmography ==
Year	Title	Credited as			Notes
Year	Title	Writer	Director	Other	Notes
1948	Under the Sun of Rome	No	No	Yes	Second assistant director
1950	Sunday in August	Yes	No	No	
1950	The Accusation	Yes	No	No	
1950	Il Brigante Musolino	Yes	No	No	
1951	Honeymoon Deferred	Yes	No	Yes	Assistant director
1951	Without a Flag	Yes	No	No	
1951	Anna	Yes	No	No	
1952	The Machine to Kill Bad People	Yes	No	No	
1952	Wife for a Night	Yes	No	No	
1952	The Three Pirates	Yes	No	No	
1952	Article 519, Penal Code	Yes	No	No	
1952	Sunday Heroes	Yes	No	No	
1953	The Unfaithfuls	Yes	No	No	
1953	Jolanda, the Daughter of the Black Corsair	Yes	No	No	Uncredited
1953	Too Young for Love	Yes	No	No	
1954	100 Years of Love	Yes	No	No	
1954	The Three Thieves	Yes	No	No	
1954	Ulysses	Yes	No	No	
1954	Human Torpedoes	Yes	No	No	Uncredited
1955	Il padrone sono me	Yes	Yes	No	Directorial debut
1960	Run with the Devil	Yes	No	No	
1962	Disorder	Yes	Yes	No	
1962	Violent Life	Yes	No	No	
1962	Smog	Yes	No	No	
1964	Amori pericolosi	Yes	No	No	"La ronda" segment
1968	Romeo and Juliet	Yes	No	No	Co-written with Masolino D'Amico and Franco Zeffirelli
1968	Black Jesus	Yes	No	No	Co-written with Valerio Zurlini
1968	The Girl Who Couldn't Say No	Yes	Yes	No	Co-written with Ennio De Concini
1968	La pietà di novembre	Yes	No	No	Television film
1970	Tulips of Haarlem	Yes	Yes	No	Co-written with Sergio Bazzini
1970	Documenti su Giuseppe Pinelli	No	No	Yes	Support
1970	The Garden of the Finzi-Continis	Yes	No	No	Uncredited
1974	Bread and Chocolate	Yes	Yes	No	David di Donatello for Best Film; Awarded the European David at the 19th David di Donatello Awards; Awarded the Silver Bear at the 1974 Berlin Film Festival; Co-written with Jaja Fiastri and Nino Manfredi
1978	Lundi la fête	Yes	No	No	Television film
1979	To Forget Venice	Yes	Yes	Yes	Producer; David di Donatello for Best Film; Nominated – Academy Award for Best International Feature Film; Co-written with Jaja Fiastri
1982	The Good Soldier	Yes	Yes	No	Nominated – Golden Lion Award at the 39th Venice International Film Festival; Co-written with Ennio De Concini
1989	The Sleazy Uncle	Yes	Yes	No	Nominated – Nastro d'Argento for Best Director; Nominated – Globo d'oro for Best Film; Co-written with Piero De Bernardi and Leonardo Benvenuti
