= Heads I Win, Tails You Lose =

- Italian theatrical release poster
- Directed by: Nanni Loy
- Written by: Franco Ferrini; Enrico Oldoini; Nanni Loy; Renato Pozzetto; Nino Manfredi
- Starring: Nino Manfredi; Renato Pozzetto
- Cinematography: Claudio Cirillo
- Music by: Carlo Rustichelli; Paolo Rustichelli
- Release date: 1982
- Country: Italy
- Language: Italian

Heads I Win, Tails You Lose (Italian: Testa o Croce, also known as Heads or Tails) is a 1982 Italian comedy film written and directed by Nanni Loy.

The film consists in two back-to-back stories that deals with two "taboo" themes: the celibacy of the clergy in the episode of Renato Pozzetto, and homosexuality in the one with Nino Manfredi.

== Cast ==
=== La pecorella smarrita ===
- Renato Pozzetto as Father Remigio
- Mara Venier as Teresa
- Carla Monti as Remigio's mother
- Giovanni Frezza as Silvano
- Mario Cei as Don Ugo

=== Il figlio del Beduino ===
- Nino Manfredi as Beduino
- Claudio Aliotti as Marco
- Paolo Stoppa as the grandfather
- Leo Gullotta as Walter
- Ida Di Benedetto as Stefania
- Maurizio Micheli as Doctor
- Franco Diogene as Massironi

== Reception ==
The film was a major success, grossing over 3 billion lire at the Italian box office.
