= Un commissario a Roma =

- Genre: Detective fiction
- Starring: Nino Manfredi; Françoise Fabian; Christine Lemler; Barbara Scoppa; Nadia Rinaldi; Jacques Barbot; Roberta Manfredi; Giorgio Tirabassi; Dario Cantarelli
- Country of origin: Italy
- No. of seasons: 1
- No. of episodes: 10

Original release
- Network: Rai 1
- Release: February 21 – April 25, 1993

Un commissario a Roma is an Italian television series.

== Cast ==
- Nino Manfredi: Commissario Franco Amidei
- Françoise Fabian: Renata Amidei
- Christine Lemler: Francesca Amidei
- Barbara Scoppa: Chiara Amidei
- Nadia Rinaldi: Albina
- Jacques Barbot: Simone
- Roberta Manfredi: Magistrato
