= Linda e il brigadiere =

Italian television series

- Starring: Nino Manfredi; Claudia Koll; Caterina Deregibus
- Country of origin: Italy
- Original language: Italian
- No. of seasons: 3
- No. of episodes: 16

Original release
- Network: Rai Uno
- Release: April 6, 1997 – March 31, 2000

Linda e il brigadiere is an Italian television series.

== Cast ==
- Nino Manfredi: Nino Fogliani
- Claudia Koll: Linda Fogliani (1-2)
- Caterina Deregibus: Linda (3)
- Michael Reale: Pierre Torrigiani
- Franca Valeri: Olga, Pierre's mother (3)
- Renato De Carmine: Piperno

== See also ==
- List of Italian television series
