= Fulvia Franco =

Italian actress (1931–1988)

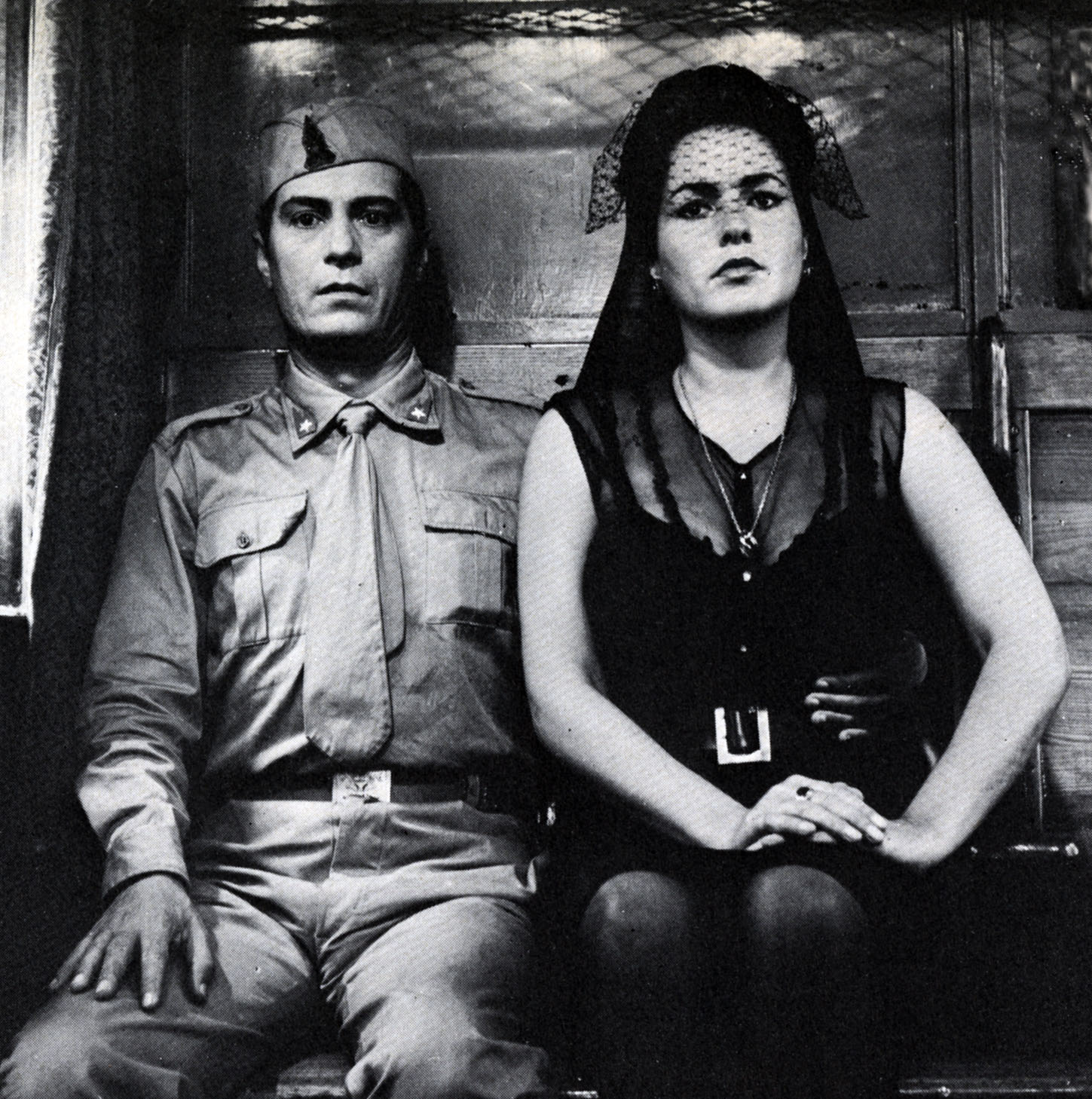
Franco with Nino Manfredi in Of Wayward Love (1962)

Fulvia Franco (21 May 1931 – 15 May 1988) was an Italian actress, model and beauty pageant titleholder.

== Life and career ==
Born in Trieste, the daughter of a businessman, Franco won the third edition of the Miss Italia beauty contest held in 1948 in Stresa. As the winner, Franco was also awarded a small role in an upcoming movie, Totò al giro d'Italia, starring Totò, who was a member of the jury. Thanks to the success of the film, Franco continued her film career, even appearing in leading roles; her most significant and critically appreciated role was the sensual widow in L’avventura di un soldato, the directorial debut of Nino Manfredi which was part of the anthology film Of Wayward Love.

Franco was married to the actor and boxer Tiberio Mitri for about twenty years, and she starred with him on several fotoromanzi.

== Partial filmography ==
- Toto Tours Italy (1948) - Miss Italia
- Romanticismo (1949) - Mrs. Pochini
- Toto in Color (1952) - Poppy
- Il romanzo della mia vita (1952) - Clara Ricci
- Primo premio: Mariarosa (1952)
- Beauties on Motor Scooters (1952) - Marcella
- Finalmente libero! (1953) - Giuditta
- Matrimonial Agency (1953) - Mara
- Tripoli, Beautiful Land of Love (1954) - Nadia
- Bertoldo, Bertoldino e Cacasenno (1954) - Ortensia
- Toto in Hell (1955) - Una moglie
- Carovana di canzoni (1955)
- Sins of Casanova (1955) - Bettina
- La rossa (1955) - Amelia - detta 'La Rossa'
- La moglie è uguale per tutti (1955) - Agatina Cuccurullo
- Scapricciatiello (1955) - Carmela
- La catena dell'odio (1955) - Lidia
- Donne, amore e matrimoni (1956) - Maria
- The Knight of the Black Sword (1957) - Livia
- Le belle dell'aria (1957) - Edmunda
- The Lady Doctor (1957) - Caterina
- Peppino, le modelle e chella là (1957) - Lucia
- Onore e sangue (1957) - Arturo's Fiancée
- Buongiorno primo amore! (1957) - Leandra
- A sud niente di nuovo (1957) - Fulvia
- Tempest (1958) - Palaska
- Hercules Unchained (1959) - Anticlea - Mother of Ulysses
- The Black Archer (1959) - La zingara
- Some Like It Cold (1961) - Luisa
- Of Wayward Love (1962) - La vedova (segment "L'avventura di un soldato")
- Obiettivo ragazze (1963) - Dolores
- Hercules, Samson and Ulysses (1963) - Ithaca Queen
- High Infidelity (1964) - Raffaella (segment "Scandaloso")
- Queste pazze pazze donne (1964) - The Lady ('Pochi ma buoni'
- Massacre at Marble City (1964) - Ilona
- Letti sbagliati (1965) - La moglie du Filippo (segment "00-Sexy, missione bionda platino")
- A Coffin for the Sheriff (1965) - Lulu Belle
- For Love and Gold (1966) - Luisa
- Two Sons of Ringo (1966) - Margaret
- Una rete piena di sabbia (1966)
- The Magnificent Texan (1967) - Estella
- Brutti di notte (1968) - Madame Ananas
- Don Chisciotte and Sancio Panza (1968) - Duchess
- Mercanti di vergini (1969)
- Tara Pokì (1971) - Donna Grazia (final film role)
