= Of Wayward Love =

1962 film

- Directed by: Alberto Bonucci; Sergio Sollima; Nino Manfredi; Luciano Lucignani
- Screenplay by: Fabio Carpi; Sandro Continenza; Renato Mainardi; Nino Manfredi; Giuseppe Orlandini; Guglielmo Santangelo; Ettore Scola
- Starring: Nino Manfredi; Vittorio Gassman; Enrico Maria Salerno
- Cinematography: Erico Menczer
- Edited by: Eraldo Da Roma
- Music by: Piero Umiliani
- Release date: 24 December 1962
- Country: Italy
- Language: Italian

Of Wayward Love (Italian: L'amore difficile), also known as Sex Can Be Difficult, is a 1962 Italian comedy anthology film directed by Alberto Bonucci, Sergio Sollima, Nino Manfredi and Luciano Lucignani. The film represents the directorial debut of the four authors, who were however all experienced in other areas of the film industry (Manfredi and Bonucci as actors, Lucignani and Sollima as writers). The four episodes are based on short stories by well-known Italian novelists (Mario Soldati, Alberto Moravia, Italo Calvino and Ercole Patti) and share the themes of love and betrayal.

The film was co-produced with West Germany where it was released with the title Schwierige Liebe.

== Cast ==
=== Le donne ===
- Enrico Maria Salerno: The man
- Catherine Spaak: Valeria
- Claudia Mori: Bruna

(directed by Sergio Sollima)

=== L'avaro ===
- Vittorio Gassman: Tullio Monari
- Nadia Tiller: Elena De Gasperis
- Adriano Rimoldi: Tino De Gasperis
- Lilla Brignone: Tullio's mother

(directed by Luciano Lucignani)

=== L'avventura di un soldato ===
- Nino Manfredi: The soldier
- Fulvia Franco: The widow
- Rosita Pisano: The mother

(directed by Nino Manfredi)

=== Il serpente ===
- Gastone Moschin: The police sergeant
- Bernhard Wicki: Bernhard, the husband
- Lilli Palmer: Hilde, the wife
- Corrado Olmi: Carabiniere

(directed by Alberto Bonucci)
