= The Sleazy Uncle =

1989 Italian film by Franco Brusati

- Directed by: Franco Brusati
- Starring: Vittorio Gassman; Giancarlo Giannini; Andréa Ferréol; Simona Cavallari
- Cinematography: Romano Albani
- Music by: Stefano Marcucci
- Release date: 1989
- Country: Italy
- Language: Italian

Lo zio indegno (internationally released as The Sleazy Uncle) is a 1989 Italian comedy film directed by Franco Brusati. Vittorio Gassman was awarded a Nastro d'Argento Best Actor for his portrayal of Uncle Luca.

== Cast ==
- Vittorio Gassman: Uncle Luca
- Giancarlo Giannini: Riccardo
- Andréa Ferréol: Teresa
- Kim Rossi Stuart: Andrea
- Beatrice Palme: La Chanteuse
- Simona Cavallari: Marina
- Stefania Sandrelli: Isabella
- Caterina Boratto
