= Will Our Heroes Be Able to Find Their Friend Who Has Mysteriously Disappeared in Africa? =

1968 film by Ettore Scola

- Theatrical release poster
- Italian: Riusciranno i nostri eroi a ritrovare l'amico misteriosamente scomparso in Africa?
- Directed by: Ettore Scola
- Written by: Agenore Incrocci; Furio Scarpelli; Ettore Scola
- Produced by: Gianni Hecht Lucari
- Starring: Alberto Sordi; Bernard Blier; Nino Manfredi
- Cinematography: Claudio Cirillo
- Edited by: Franco Arcalli
- Music by: Armando Trovajoli
- Production company: Documento Film
- Distributed by: Titanus
- Release date: 19 December 1968
- Running time: 130 minutes
- Country: Italy
- Language: Italian

Will Our Heroes Be Able to Find Their Friend Who Has Mysteriously Disappeared in Africa? (Italian: Riusciranno i nostri eroi a ritrovare l'amico misteriosamente scomparso in Africa?) is a 1968 Italian adventure-comedy film co-written and directed by Ettore Scola.

The film was the sixth highest-grossing release at the Italian box office in the 1968–69 season.

== Plot ==
The Roman businessman Fausto Di Salvio can no longer stand his work and his sloppy and emotionless way of life. The chance to escape from this "prison" occurs when the news of the death of his brother-in-law, Oreste Sabbatini, known as "Titino", arrives from Africa. Fausto, with his employee Ubaldo, his firm's accountant, leaves immediately to Angola in search of Titino, a journey that will take many months of travel and will involve them in many adventures. They follow in Titino's tracks, but it seems that he cannot be found. From what they learn by speaking to people who have met him, Titino appears to be a man of many resources who has left behind him many people crazy of him, but even someone who was cheated by him and who would be glad to lay hands on him.

As they lose hope that they will ever find Titino, Fausto and Ubaldo are captured by a tribe of natives who turn out to be governed by the shaman Oreste, the brother-in-law of Fausto. They propose to Titino to come back with them to Italy. After some hesitation, Titino decides to accompany them to Italy. However, once aboard the ship departing the place where he had long lived among the natives, he finds himself unable to endure separation from the tribe that had welcomed and cared for him. He therefore leaps from the vessel bound for Europe and swims back to the people he loves.

== Cast ==
- Alberto Sordi as Fausto Di Salvio
- Nino Manfredi as Oreste Sabatini (Titino)
- Bernard Blier as Ubaldo Palmarini
- Giuliana Lojodice as Marisa
- Franca Bettoia as Rita
- Manuel Zarzo as Pedro Tomeo
- Erika Blanc as Genevieve

== Production ==
The plot is loosely based on books by Salgari, Verne and Conrad that Scola read as a child and on Italian Disney comics artist Romano Scarpa's comic Topolino e il Pippotarzan (1957).

Production of the film started in 1965, with the working title Mister Sabatini, suppongo ('Mister Sabatini, I Suppose'). Except for a few scenes shot in Pescasseroli and in some locations near Rome, the film was entirely shot in Angola. It started a trend in Italian cinema of using extremely long film titles.

== Reception ==
The film was released in Italy on 19 December 1968 and was a massive success, grossing almost 2 billion lire at the Italian box office. In France, the film's anti-colonialist themes were opposed by its distributor, who cut several scenes without Scola's knowledge; the actor Bernard Blier discovered the cuts while dubbing his role and alerted Scola, resulting in the film's French release being delayed for about ten years.
