= Bread and Chocolate =

Bread and Chocolate (Pane e cioccolata)
- DVD cover
- Directed by: Franco Brusati
- Written by: Franco Brusati; Jaja Fiastri; Nino Manfredi
- Produced by: Maurizio Lodi-Fe; Turi Vasile
- Starring: Nino Manfredi; Johnny Dorelli; Anna Karina
- Cinematography: Luciano Tovoli
- Edited by: Mario Morra
- Music by: Daniele Patucchi
- Production company: Verona Produzione
- Distributed by: Cinema International Corporation
- Release dates: 1974 (Italy, France); July 14, 1978 (USA)
- Running time: 111 minutes
- Country: Italy
- Languages: Italian; German; English
- Box office: $1.7 million

Bread and Chocolate (Italian: Pane e cioccolata) is a 1974 Italian comedy-drama film directed by Franco Brusati. This film chronicles the misadventures of an Italian immigrant to Switzerland and is representative of the commedia all'italiana film genre. In 2008, the film was included on the Italian Ministry of Cultural Heritage’s 100 Italian films to be saved, a list of 100 films that "have changed the collective memory of the country between 1942 and 1978."

== Plot ==
Like many southern Europeans of the period (1960s to early 1970s), Nino Garofalo is a migrant "guest worker" from Italy, working as a waiter in Switzerland. He loses his work permit when he is caught urinating in public, so he begins to lead a clandestine life in Switzerland.

At first he is supported by Elena, a Greek woman and political refugee. Then he is befriended by an Italian industrialist, relocated to Switzerland because of financial problems. The industrialist takes him under his wing and invests his savings for him, but kills himself after his financial scheme collapses, without having told Nino where he deposited his savings.

Nino is constrained to find shelter with a group of clandestine Neapolitans living in a chicken coop, together with the same chickens they tend to in order to survive.

Intrigued by the sight of a group of blonde Swiss youths bathing in a river, he decides to dye his hair and pass himself off as a local. In a bar, when openly rooting for the Italy national football team during the broadcast of a match, he is found out as a migrant Italian worker, after celebrating a goal scored by Fabio Capello.

He is arrested and brought to a police station. He meets Elena again, who wants to give him a renewed permit but he refuses. He embarks on a train and finds himself in a cabin filled with returning Italian guest workers. Amid the songs of "sun" and "sea", he is seen having second thoughts.

== Cast ==
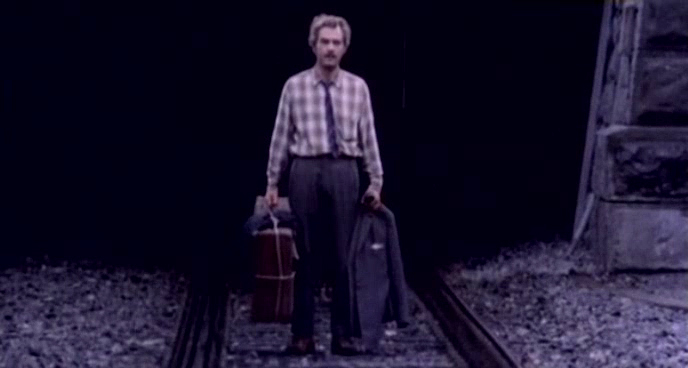
A scene from the film

- Nino Manfredi as Nino Garofalo
- Johnny Dorelli as Italian Industrialist
- Anna Karina as Elena
- Paolo Turco as Gianni
- Ugo D'Alessio as Old Man
- Tano Cimarosa as Giacomo
- Gianfranco Barra as The Turk
- Giorgio Cerioni as Police Inspector
- Francesco D'Adda as Rudiger
- Geoffrey Copleston as Boegli
- Federico Scrobogna as Grigory
- Max Delys as Renzo
- Umberto Raho as Maitre
- Nelide Giammarco as The Blonde
- Manfred Freyberger as The Sportman

== Production ==
Ugo Pirro worked uncredited on the script during its early stages of development. The first choice for the main role was Ugo Tognazzi, who soon clashed with Brusati and exited the project; Alberto Sordi was interested in the film but also pretended to direct it. Brusati eventually offered the project to Manfredi in the autumn 1972; Manfredi, who came from a family of emigrants, immediately accepted and revised the screenplay, with uncredited contributions from Leonardo Benvenuti and Piero De Bernardi. The working title was Le porte del paradiso ('The doors of Paradise'). Principal cinematography started on February 1973 and ended in November; locations include Rome, the canton of Bern, Lake Lucerne and Lake Bracciano.

== Reception ==
Released on 18 January 1974, the film was a massive success at the Italian box office, grossing 2,8 billion lire.

In the Chicago Sun-Times, film critic Roger Ebert wrote:

Bread and Chocolate is a sneaky comedy that winds up being serious about its subject. It reminds us of some of Chaplin's later features, and maybe it's no coincidence that the lead character looks like Chaplin. He's a Southern Italian waiter named Nino (Nino Manfredi), who goes to Switzerland to tryout for a restaurant job and finds himself caught in a net of discrimination...

The only sympathy he gets comes from a neighbor (Anna Karina), a Greek immigrant who's concealing her child from the immigration authorities. Despondent, he goes into the country to find work on a chicken farm, and the film finds its best and most unforgettable image: a chicken-coop filled with immigrant laborers, who peer with admiration and envy through chicken wire at a crowd of Swiss kids frolicking in a pool.

It's here that we most completely feel the movie's underlying tension and seriousness. Other films have considered the dilemma of immigrant workers in Europe ... but not until this film by Franco Brusati has the subject been approached as a comedy.

== Awards ==
- The film won several international awards including the Silver Bear at the 24th Berlin International Film Festival in 1974.
- New York Film Critics Circle Award for Best Foreign Language Film 1978
