= A Dangerous Toy =

- Directed by: Giuliano Montaldo
- Written by: Sergio Donati; Giuliano Montaldo; Nino Manfredi
- Produced by: Claudio Mancini; Fulvio Morsella
- Starring: Nino Manfredi; Marlène Jobert; Arnoldo Foà; Olga Karlatos; Vittorio Mezzogiorno; Pamela Villoresi
- Cinematography: Ennio Guarnieri
- Edited by: Nino Baragli
- Music by: Ennio Morricone
- Release date: 21 February 1979
- Running time: 118
- Country: Italy
- Language: Italian

A Dangerous Toy (originally titled Il giocattolo) is a 1979 Italian noir film written and directed by Giuliano Montaldo. It was co-produced by Sergio Leone. The toy of the title is a gun. The film chronicles how a frustrated and shy accountant may become a cruel and ruthless executioner.

== Plot ==
The accountant Vittorio Barletta lives in Milan with his wife Ada. A friend since childhood of the industrialist Nicola Griffo, Vittorio serves him as a security carrier and as a cover for "black funds". Wounded in the course of a robbery at a supermarket, Barletta is replaced by a more aggressive former carabinieri marshal for the tasks of security guard of the Griffo. In the meantime, having made acquaintance and friendship with the agent Sauro Civera, Vittorio finds out of having a talent for pistol shooting and becomes so expert as to win shooting competitions. Robbed of his newly acquired weapon, the accountant receives a pistol as a gift from Sauro. Having gone with his policeman friend to a pizzeria, the latter recognizes a convict who reacts by killing him, but Vittorio too, after a few moments of perplexity, shoots and kills the bandit. The TV and the press cover the hero but the noise doesn't last long and doesn't bring in money. Ada is seriously ill. Vittorio is teased by Nicola, by his wife, Laura, and by the reckless daughter of the Griffos, Patrizia. Meanwhile, threats of evil are multiplying, communicated by telephone or through anonymous letters. During an ambush, he shots and wounds the attackers then he spends a few days in jail. Abandoned by Nicola, who fires him after making him sign the sale of a phantom company, the accountant locks himself up in the house with the increasingly weak Ada. Then, when he can't take it anymore, Vittorio decides to humiliate the Griffos, but his dying wife is determined to stop him.

== Cast ==
- Nino Manfredi as Vittorio Barletta
- Marlène Jobert as Ada Barletta
- Arnoldo Foà as Nicola Griffo
- Vittorio Mezzogiorno as Sauro Civera
- Olga Karlatos as Laura Griffo
- Pamela Villoresi as Patrizia Griffo
- Mario Brega as the robber
- Luciano Catenacci as Griffo's bodyguard
- Renato Scarpa as the gunsmith
- Daniele Formica as Gualtiero
- Arnaldo Ninchi as TV interviewer

== Production ==
The film was co-produced by Sergio Leone, who preferred to stay uncredited and leave the credit to his brother-in-law Fulvio Morsella. It marked the return to collaboration between Leone and his long-time associate Sergio Donati (who had been brought into the project before Leone's involvement) after the pair had had a falling out during the post-production of Duck, You Sucker!. The Donati's original script, titled Mi faccio la pistola ('I'll get myself a gun'), was inspired by the accidental killing of Lazio footballer Luciano Re Cecconi. The first choice for the role of Vittorio was Giancarlo Giannini. Principal cinematography started on November 1978; the film was shot between Rome, Milan and Verderio Superiore. The original screenplay had a darker ending, which was eventually re-written at the request of the leading actor Nino Manfredi against the wishes of Leone and Donati.

== Reception ==
Domestically the film was a box office hit, grossing over 1,2 billion lira and being the tenth highest-grossing film of the year. For his performance in this film Vittorio Mezzogiorno won the Silver Ribbon for Best Supporting Actor.
