= Armando Nannuzzi =

Italian cinematographer (1925–2001)

- Born: 21 September 1925; Rome, Kingdom of Italy
- Died: 14 May 2001 (aged 75); Ostia, Italy
- Occupation: Cinematographer

Armando Nannuzzi (21 September 1925 – 14 May 2001) was an Italian cinematographer and camera operator active from the 1940s until the 1990s. His career spanned six decades and over 100 films.

== Biography ==
Nannuzzi briefly worked in the United States in the mid-1980s, and during this period he collaborated with horror novelist Stephen King on Maximum Overdrive, King's directorial debut.

An accident occurred on 31 July 1985, during shooting in a suburb of Wilmington, North Carolina, for Maximum Overdrive. A radio controlled lawnmower used in a scene went out of control and struck a block of wood used as a camera support, shooting out wood splinters which injured Nannuzzi, the director of photography on the production. As a result, Nannuzzi lost his right eye.

After the incident, Nannuzzi sued Stephen King, and 17 others on 18 February 1987 for $18 million in damages due to unsafe working practices. The suit was settled out of court, for $975,000.

Other films in which he served as a cinematographer include Sandra (1965) and Frankenstein Unbound (1990). He was also a frequent collaborator of Mauro Bolognini's.

Nannuzzi died on 14 May 2001 in Ostia, Italy, although some sources say he died in April 2001. He was 75.

== Selected filmography ==
=== 1950s ===
1955 Lo Svitato
1956 The Window to Luna Park
1956 Donna del giorno
1957 Mariti in città
1958 Young Husbands
1958 Three Strangers in Rome
1958 Mogli pericolose
1959 Tunisi top secret
1959 Everyone's in Love
1959 Bad Girls Don't Cry

=== 1960s ===
1960 Il Bell'Antonio
1961 The Brigand
1962 Mafioso
1963 The Girl from Parma
1964 The Magnificent Cuckold
1965 Sandra
1965 I Knew Her Well
1969 The Damned

=== 1970s ===
1970 Waterloo
1977 Jesus of Nazareth
1978 La Cage aux Folles

=== 1980s ===
1980 La Cage aux Folles II
1985 Silver Bullet
1986 Maximum Overdrive

=== 1990s ===
1990 Frankenstein Unbound
1992 Acquitted for Having Committed the Deed
