= Café Express (film) =

1980 film

- Film poster
- Directed by: Nanni Loy
- Written by: Elvio Porta; Nanni Loy; Nino Manfredi
- Produced by: Nicola Carraro; Franco Cristaldi
- Starring: Nino Manfredi
- Cinematography: Claudio Cirillo
- Edited by: Franco Fraticelli
- Music by: Giovanna Marini
- Distributed by: Showcase Entertainment
- Release date: 1980
- Running time: 100 minutes
- Country: Italy
- Language: Italian

Café Express is a 1980 Italian comedy film directed by Nanni Loy and starring Nino Manfredi.

== Plot ==
Michele Abbagnano ekes out a living by abusively selling coffee, hot milk and cappuccino on the night trains running between Naples and Vallo della Lucania; each night, his goods held in a set of vacuum flasks which he carries in a basket along with handfuls of sugar packets he steals from railway cafés, he moves from carriage to carriage peddling warm drinks to the dazed, sleepy passengers.

The need to maintain his young son (who suffers from a congenital heart deficiency) in an institution and the hope to amass a large enough sum to have him undergo surgery to make him healthy for good is more than enough to keep Michele in his awkward and exhausting line of business, to which, however, he's exceptionally suited.

Keen of eye and wit he manages to befriend most of the passengers on the night trains, helping them with small favours (like waking them up before the stations they need to descend at) and telling tall tales centered on his right arm, which he keeps wrapped in a long leather glove pretending it to be wooden.

Michele tailors the stories to the people he's telling them to...pretending of having been a successful pianist who had his career ruined to a young cross-eyed man pining about having been rejected from the Carabinieri, telling how he saved orphanage boys from a roaring fire to the nun leading some schoolboys, narrating how he lost the limb to freezing on the Eastern Front to the WW2 veteran and so on.

During one night of work Michele will be chased across the train by a trio of conductors who have been ordered by the Ministry of Transports to put an end to his activities once and for all; he'll meet his son (who has escaped from the institution) and will cross paths with a trio of petty thieves decided to enroll him as an accomplice in their misdeeds.

== Cast ==
- Nino Manfredi - Michele Abbagnano
- Adolfo Celi - chief inspector Ramacci-Pisanelli of the Ministry of Transportation
- Vittorio Caprioli - Improta, chief of the pickpockets
- Vittorio Mezzogiorno - Diodato "mad man" Amitrano, Improta's accomplice
- Antonio Allocca - Califano, Improta's accomplice
- Gigi Reder - Antonio Cammarota, the stretcher-bearer
- Silvio Spaccesi - Giuseppe Sanguigno, train conductor
- Gerardo Scala - Nicola Scognamiglio, train controller (the cooled one)
- Luigi Basagaluppi - Vigorito, train controller (the drunkard one)
- Marisa Laurito - Liberata, Ferdinando's lover
- Marzio Honorato - Ferdinando, Liberata's lover
- Vittorio Marsiglia - Picone, the neapolitan businessman
- Maurizio Micheli - The piedmontese businessman
- Clara Colosimo - Valmarana, the piedmontese businesswoman
- Giovanni Piscopo - Michele's son, nicknamed Cazzillo
- Leo Gullotta - Imbastaro, the cross-eyed man
- Tano Cimarosa - Panepino, railroad police officer
- Lina Sastri - Mother Camilla, a nun
- Ester Carloni - the old passenger
- Nino Terzo - Zappacosta, stationmaster of Vallo della Lucania
- Italo Celoro - the worker with bandaged finger
- Nino Vingelli - the trickster dressed as a priest
- Franca Scagnetti - the passenger leaving the bathroom

== Production ==
Nanni Loy developed the idea for the film in 1977 while working on the television candid-camera show Viaggio in seconda classe, whose pranks took place aboard a moving train; in one episode, broadcast on 6 April 1977, he knew and interviewed an abusive coffee seller who served as main inspiration for the role of Michele Abbagnano. The film was initially conceived as a segment of a two-part film titled "Fa male mischiare" (lit. 'Mixing Hurts '); the two segments were eventually developed into full-length films, the other of them becoming Steno's Hot Potato.

For the shootings, the crew used a railway carriage purchased from a Castellammare di Stabia metalworking company and dismantled at the Vides Studios in Prima Porta.

== Reception ==
The film was a massive success, grossing about 7 billion lire at the Italian box office. The film won three Nastro d'Argento awards, for best actor (Manfredi), best script and a special Nastro for the producers. Vittorio Caprioli won a Globo d'oro for best supporting actor.

== See also ==
- List of Italian films of 1980
