= Treasure of San Gennaro =

Treasure of San Gennaro (Operazione San Gennaro)
- Directed by: Dino Risi
- Written by: Adriano Baracco; Ennio De Concini; Dino Risi
- Produced by: Turi Vasile
- Starring: Nino Manfredi; Senta Berger; Totò; Claudine Auger; Mario Adorf; Harry Guardino
- Cinematography: Aldo Tonti
- Music by: Armando Trovajoli
- Distributed by: Interfilm (Italy); Gaumont Distribution (France)
- Release date: 25 November 1966
- Running time: 104 minutes
- Countries: Italy; France
- Language: Italian
- Box office: $2 million (Italy)

Treasure of San Gennaro (Italian: Operazione San Gennaro) is a 1966 Italian comedy film starring Nino Manfredi, Senta Berger, Totò and Claudine Auger. Directed by Dino Risi, it is the story of a heist gone wrong. It won a Silver Prize at the 5th Moscow International Film Festival.

== Plot ==
A group of American criminals arrive in Naples to steal the holy treasures of its patron saint. They enlist the help of the local mafia, who are torn between the multibillion-lire proposition and their loyalty to the community.

== Cast ==
- Nino Manfredi as Armandino "Dudu" Girasole
- Senta Berger as Maggie
- Harry Guardino as Jack
- Claudine Auger as Concettina
- Totò as Don Vincenzo
- Mario Adorf as Sciascillo
- Ugo Fangareggi as Agonia
- Dante Maggio as Il capitano
- Giovanni Bruti as Il cardinale
- Pinuccio Ardia as Il barone
- Vittoria Crispo as Mamma Assunta
- Ralf Wolter as Frank

== Production ==
The film was originally conceived as a serious heist film, with Jean-Paul Belmondo intended to play the lead role. Principal cinematography started in Naples on July 1966. Carlo Croccolo dubbed the voices of at least 15 characters, including those portrayed by Harry Guardino, Totò, Mario Adorf, Pinuccio Ardia, and Ralf Wolter.

== Cancelled sequel ==
Following the success of the film, in the early 1967, Manfredi and Ennio De Concini started working on a sequel set in New York titled Dudù a Nuova York. Following the release of numerous rip-offs and unofficial sequels, most notably Lucio Fulci's Operation St. Peter's, the project was eventually shelved.
