= Portrait of a Woman, Nude =

1981 film by Nino Manfredi

- Directed by: Nino Manfredi
- Written by: Silvana Buzzo; Age; Ruggero Maccari; Nino Manfredi; Giuseppe Moccia; Furio Scarpelli
- Produced by: Franco Committeri
- Starring: Nino Manfredi; Eleonora Giorgi
- Cinematography: Danilo Desideri
- Edited by: Sergio Montanari
- Music by: Roberto Gatto; Maurizio Giammarco
- Release date: 6 November 1981
- Country: Italy
- Language: Italian

Portrait of a Woman, Nude (Italian: Nudo di donna, also known as Portrait of a Nude Woman) is a 1981 Italian mystery-comedy film. It is the third and final film directed by Nino Manfredi.

== Cast ==
- Nino Manfredi as Sandro
- Eleonora Giorgi as Laura / Riri
- Jean-Pierre Cassel as Pireddu
- Georges Wilson as Arch. Zanetto
- Carlo Bagno as Giovanni
- Beatrice Ring as Beatrice
- Donato Castellaneta as Ciccio
- Giuseppe Maffioli as the drunkard

== Production ==
After penning the initial script, Manfredi asked Mario Monicelli to direct it; during pre-production, Monicelli found himself at odds with Manfredi over several aspects of the project and ultimately withdrew from it. Alberto Lattuada was called to replace Monicelli, and principal cinematography started in Venice on April 1981. Three weeks before filming wrapped, on 8 July, Lattuada abruptly abandoned the direction of the film following his repeated clashes with Manfredi, and was replaced by the same Manfredi.

== Reception ==
The film was a moderate success, grossing slightly more than one billion lire at the Italian box office. It received mixed reviews from critics.
