= The Girl from Parma =

- Directed by: Antonio Pietrangeli
- Starring: Nino Manfredi
- Cinematography: Armando Nannuzzi
- Music by: Piero Piccioni
- Release date: 1963
- Country: Italy
- Language: Italian

La parmigiana (internationally released as The Girl from Parma) is a 1963 Italian comedy drama film directed by Antonio Pietrangeli. The film describes the disappointing sentimental experiences of an orphan girl (Catherine Spaak).

== Cast ==
- Catherine Spaak: Dora
- Nino Manfredi: Nino Meciotti
- Salvo Randone: Scipio Pagliughi
- Didi Perego: Amneris Pagliughi
- Lando Buzzanca: Michele Pantanò
- Vanni De Maigret: Giacomo Doselli
- Rosalia Maggio: Iris
- Umberto D'Orsi: ingegnere Masselli
- Francesco Barilli: the boy from Montechiarugolo, in Parma (uncredited)
- Mario Brega: plainclothes policeman, in Rome (uncredited)
