= I Knew Her Well =

1965 Italian comedy-drama film by Antonio Pietrangeli

- Io la conoscevo bene
- Directed by: Antonio Pietrangeli
- Written by: Antonio Pietrangeli; Ruggero Maccari; Ettore Scola
- Produced by: Turi Vasile
- Starring: Stefania Sandrelli; Mario Adorf; Jean-Claude Brialy; Nino Manfredi; Enrico Maria Salerno; Ugo Tognazzi; Karin Dor; Franco Fabrizi; Turi Ferro; Joachim Fuchsberger; Robert Hoffmann; Franco Nero; Véronique Vendell
- Cinematography: Armando Nannuzzi
- Edited by: Franco Fraticelli
- Music by: Benedetto Ghiglia; Piero Piccioni
- Distributed by: Titanus
- Release dates: December 1, 1965 (Italy); August 3, 1966 (France)
- Running time: 115 minutes 97 minutes (France, Spain, West Germany)
- Countries: Italy; France; West Germany
- Language: Italian

I Knew Her Well (Italian: Io la conoscevo bene) is a 1965 Italian comedy-drama film directed by Antonio Pietrangeli and starring Stefania Sandrelli.

In 2008, the film was included on the Italian Ministry of Cultural Heritage's 100 Italian films to be saved, a list of 100 films that "have changed the collective memory of the country between 1942 and 1978."

== Plot synopsis ==
Adriana (Stefania Sandrelli) is a provincial Italian young woman who moves to Rome because she wants to be a celebrity.

== Cast ==
- Stefania Sandrelli as Adriana Astarelli
- Mario Adorf as Emilio Ricci, aka Bietolone
- Jean-Claude Brialy as Dario Marchionni
- Joachim Fuchsberger as The Writer
- Nino Manfredi as Cianfanna
- Enrico Maria Salerno as Roberto
- Ugo Tognazzi as Gigi Baggini
- Karin Dor as Barbara, the lady friend of Adriana
- Franco Fabrizi as Paganelli
- Turi Ferro as Il commissario
- Robert Hoffmann as Antonio Marais
- Franco Nero as Italo - The garage attendant
- Véronique Vendell as Alice Stendhal (credited as Veronique Vendell)
- Franca Polesello as Maria - The usherette
- Renato Terra as Man in the caravan (credited as Renato Terra Caizzi)

== Soundtrack ==
- "L'Eclisse twist"
  - Performed by Mina
- "Addio"
  - Performed by Mina
- "Ogni giorno che passa"
  - Performed by Mia Genberg
- "Le stelle d'oro"
  - Performed by Peppino Di Capri
- "Sweet William"
  - Performed by Millie
- "Surf della Frusta"
  - By Gino Marinacci
- "Oggi e domenica per noi"
  - Performed by Sergio Endrigo
- "Mani bucate"
  - Performed by Sergio Endrigo
- "Lasciati baciare col Letkiss"
  - Performed by Gemelle Kessler
- "Roberta"
  - Performed by Peppino Di Capri
- "What Am I Living For"
  - Performed by Millie
- "More"
  - Performed by Gilbert Bécaud
- "E se domani"
  - Performed by Mina
- "Abbracciami forte"
  - Performed by Ornella Vanoni
- "Dimmi la verità"
  - Performed by Sergio Endrigo
- "Toi"
  - Performed by Gilbert Bécaud
- "Let Kiss"
  - Orchestrated by Yvar Sanna

== Reception ==
On review aggregator website Rotten Tomatoes, the film holds an approval rating of 91% based on 11 reviews, with an average rating of 7.2/10.

== Awards ==
- Three Nastro d'Argento awards: Best Director, Best Script, and Best Supporting Actor (Ugo Tognazzi).
- Pietrangeli was named Best Director at the Mar del Plata Film Festival
