= High Infidelity =

1964 film

- Film poster
- Directed by: Mario Monicelli; Elio Petri; Franco Rossi; Luciano Salce
- Written by: Ruggero Maccari; Elio Petri; Ettore Scola
- Produced by: Gianni Hecht Lucari
- Starring: Nino Manfredi; Charles Aznavour; Monica Vitti; Ugo Tognazzi
- Cinematography: Gianni Di Venanzo; Ennio Guarnieri
- Edited by: Giorgio Serrallonga
- Music by: Armando Trovajoli
- Release date: 22 January 1964
- Running time: 95 minutes
- Country: Italy
- Language: Italian

High Infidelity (Italian: Alta infedeltà) is a 1964 Italian comedy film directed by Mario Monicelli, Elio Petri, Franco Rossi and Luciano Salce.

== Cast ==
"Scandaloso" segment

- Nino Manfredi as Francesco
- Fulvia Franco as Raffaella
- John Phillip Law as Ronald
- Eleanor Beacour
- Vittorio La Paglia
- Luigi Zerbinati

"Peccato nel Pomeriggio" segment

- Charles Aznavour as Giulio
- Claire Bloom as Laura

"La Sospirosa" segment

- Monica Vitti as Gloria
- Jean-Pierre Cassel as Tonino
- Sergio Fantoni as Luigi

"Gente Moderna" segment

- Ugo Tognazzi as Cesare
- Michèle Mercier as Clara
- Bernard Blier as Sergio
