= On the Tiger's Back =

- Directed by: Luigi Comencini
- Written by: Agenore Incrocci (as Age); Furio Scarpelli (as Scarpelli)
- Screenplay by: Agenore Incrocci (as Age); Furio Scarpelli (as Scarpelli); Luigi Comencini; Mario Monicelli
- Story by: Agenore Incrocci (as Age); Furio Scarpelli (as Scarpelli); Luigi Comencini; Mario Monicelli
- Produced by: Alfredo Bini
- Starring: Nino Manfredi; Mario Adorf; Valeria Moriconi; Gian Maria Volonté; Raymond Bussières
- Cinematography: Aldo Scavarda
- Edited by: Nino Baragli
- Music by: Piero Umiliani
- Color process: Black and white
- Production company: Film 5
- Distributed by: Titanus
- Release date: 20 December 1961
- Running time: 110 minutes
- Country: Italy
- Language: Italian

A cavallo della tigre is a 1961 Italian comedy-drama film written and directed by Luigi Comencini and starring Nino Manfredi, Mario Adorf, Valeria Moriconi, Gian Maria Volonté and Raymond Bussières. It was released as Jailbreak in the United Kingdom and On the Tiger's Back in the United States. In 2002 the film was remade. Giuseppe Mazzacurati directed and Fabrizio Bentivoglio starred in the new version.

== Plot ==
An inept thief wants to escape prison and return to his family, but two of his prison mates also want out.

== Cast ==
- Nino Manfredi as Giacinto Rossi
- Mario Adorf as Tagliabue
- Valeria Moriconi as Ileana Rossi
- Gian Maria Volonté as Papaleo
- Raymond Bussières as Il Sorcio
- Luciana Buzzanca as Olga
- Ferruccio De Ceresa as Coppola
- Vincenzo Fortunati as Himself
- Ferdinando Gerra as Himself
- Franco Giacobini as Medico del carcere
- Franco Morici as Himself (as Franco Morici)

== See also ==
- List of Italian films of 1961
- A Cavallo della Tigre (2002 film)
