= Nino Manfredi =

Italian actor (1921–2004)

Nino Manfredi OMRI
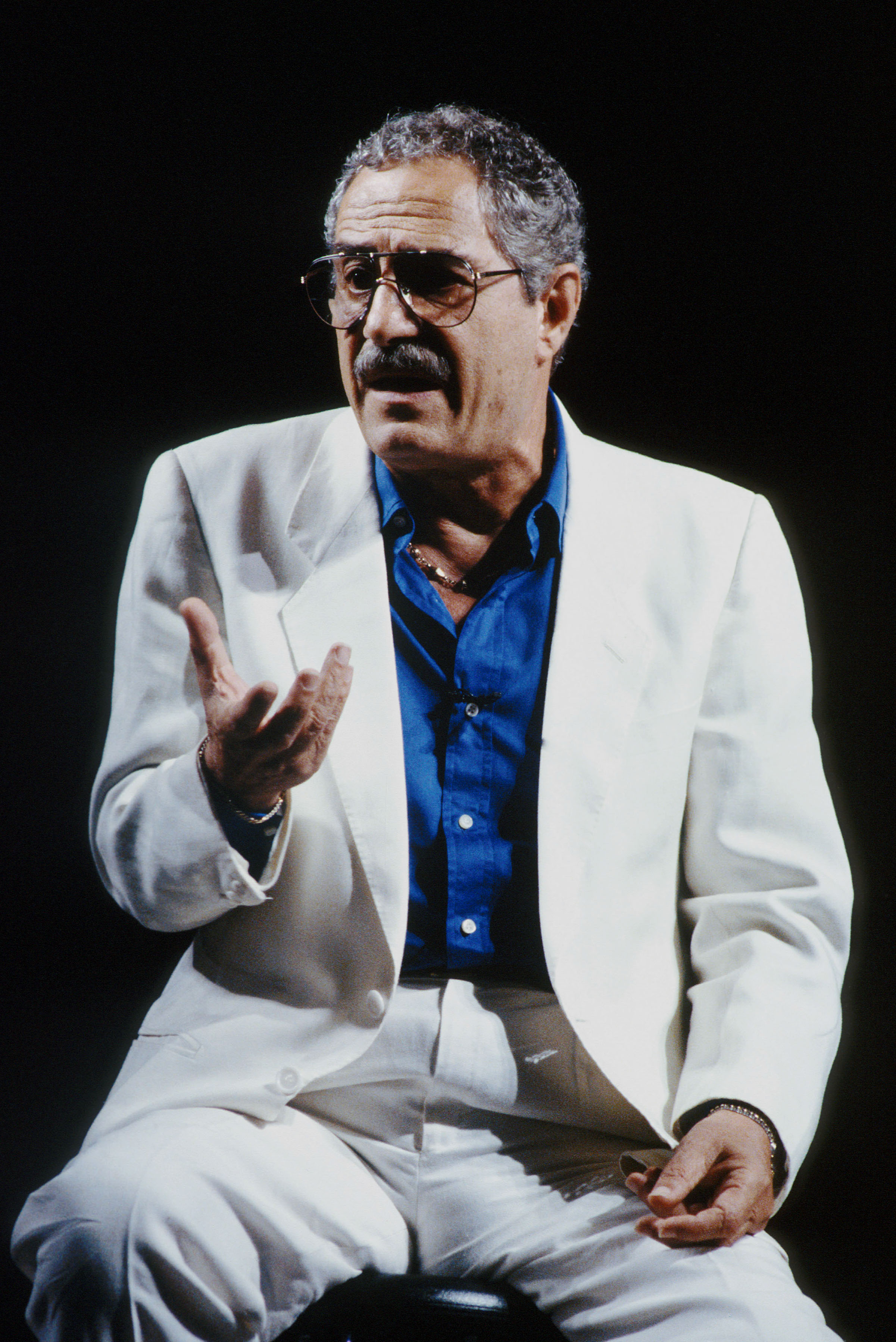
- Manfredi in 1990
- Born: Saturnino Manfredi; 22 March 1921; Castro dei Volsci, Italy
- Died: 4 June 2004 (aged 83); Rome, Italy
- Occupations: Actor; voice actor; director; screenwriter; comedian; singer
- Years active: 1949–2004
- Height: 1.75 m (5 ft 9 in)
- Spouse: Erminia Ferrari (m. 1955)
- Children: 4, including Luca and Roberta

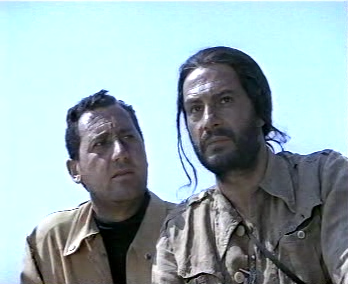
Alberto Sordi and Manfredi in Will Our Heroes Be Able to Find Their Friend Who Has Mysteriously Disappeared in Africa? (1968)

Saturnino "Nino" Manfredi (22 March 1921 – 4 June 2004) was an Italian actor, voice actor, director, screenwriter, playwright, comedian, singer, author, radio personality and television presenter.

He was one of the most prominent Italian actors in the commedia all'italiana genre. During his career he won several awards, including six David di Donatello awards, six Nastro d'Argento awards and the Prix de la première oeuvre (Best First Work Award) at the 1971 Cannes Film Festival for Between Miracles. Typically playing losers, marginalised, working-class characters yet "in possession of their dignity, morality, and underlying optimism", he was referred to as "one of the few truly complete actors in Italian cinema".

== Life and career ==
=== Early life ===
Manfredi was born in Castro dei Volsci, Frosinone into a humble family of farmers. His father recruited in Public Safety, where he reached the rank of Maresciallo, and in the early 1930s, he was transferred to Rome, where Nino and his younger brother Dante spent their childhood in the popular neighborhood of San Giovanni. In 1937, he became seriously ill with bilateral pleurisy, and after a doctor gave him only three months to live, he remained several years hospitalized in a sanatorium; there he learned to play a banjo built by himself and he entered the musical band of the hospital. To please his family in October 1941, he enrolled at the university in the Faculty of Law, but already in the same year he showed an interest and a natural inclination for the stage, making his debut as a presenter and an actor in the theater of a parish in Rome.

After 8 September 1943, in order to avoid conscription, he took refuge for a year with his brother in the mountains above Cassino; returned to Rome in 1944, he resumed his university studies and, at the same time, he enrolled at the National Academy of Dramatic Art. In October 1945, he graduated in law with a thesis in criminal law, without ever practicing the profession, and in June 1947, he graduated from the academy.

=== Early career ===
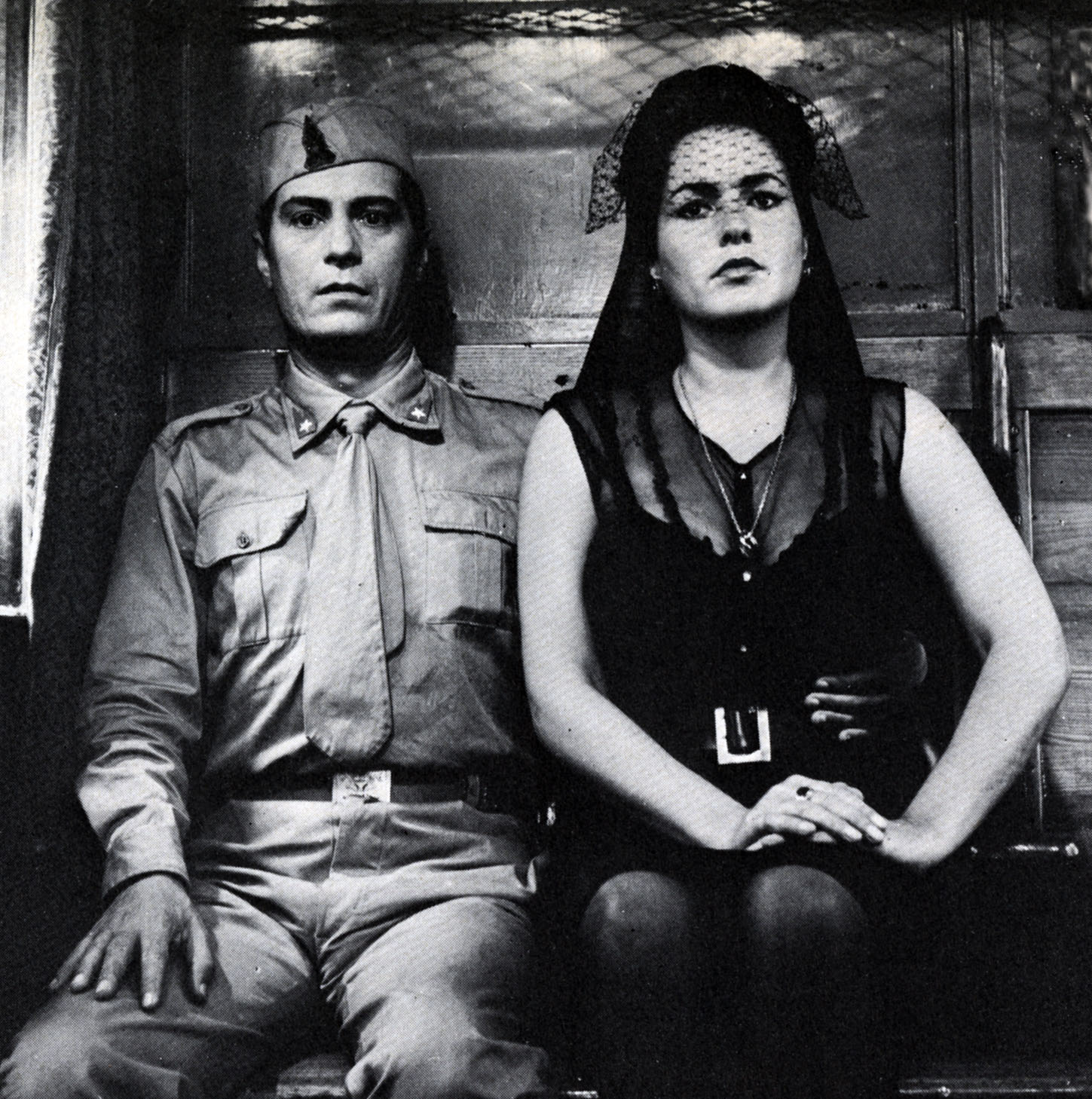
Manfredi and Fulvia Franco in Of Wayward Love (1962)

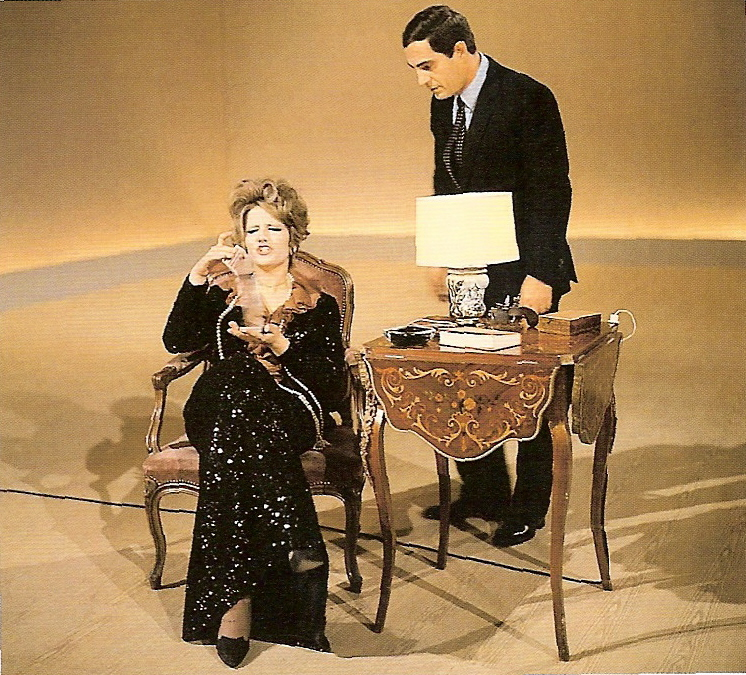
Manfredi and Mina on the TV show Studio Uno (1965)

Manfredi made his official stage debut in 1947, working in plays directed by Luigi Squarzina and Vito Pandolfi. The same year, he entered the Maltagliati-Gassman stage company, mostly acting in dramatic roles. In 1948, he entered the company of the Piccolo Teatro di Milano under Giorgio Strehler, playing in tragedies such as Romeo and Juliet and The Storm. The same year he started working on radio as a comedian and an impersonator. In 1949, he made his film debut in the melodrama Monastero di Santa Chiara. In 1952, he worked with Eduardo De Filippo in Tre atti unici, along with Tino Buazzelli, Paolo Panelli and Bice Valori. The same year he entered the revue company of the Nava sisters, and started working as a voice actor and a dubber. In 1955, he took part in his first high-profile films, The Bachelor by Antonio Pietrangeli and Wild Love by Mauro Bolognini.

=== First successes ===
In 1958, Manfredi got his first film role as the main actor. The same year he formed a revue company with Delia Scala and Paolo Panelli, getting some success with the musical Un trapezio per Lisistrata. In 1959, the trio was chosen by RAI to host Canzonissima; the show marked the turning point of the career of Manfredi, who enjoyed a very large popularity, mainly thanks to the "macchietta" (i.e. comic caricature) of the "Barman from Ceccano". The success immediately got him a contract with Dino De Laurentiis which he dropped after one year to be free to choose his favorite projects.

In 1962, Manfredi enjoyed an even larger success playing the title role in the stage musical Rugantino, with which he toured also in Canada, the US, and Argentina. The same year he directed the critically appreciated segment "L'avventura di un soldato" in the anthology film Of Wayward Love. In 1963 he starred in Luis García Berlanga's masterpiece The Executioner.

=== Commedia all'italiana icon ===
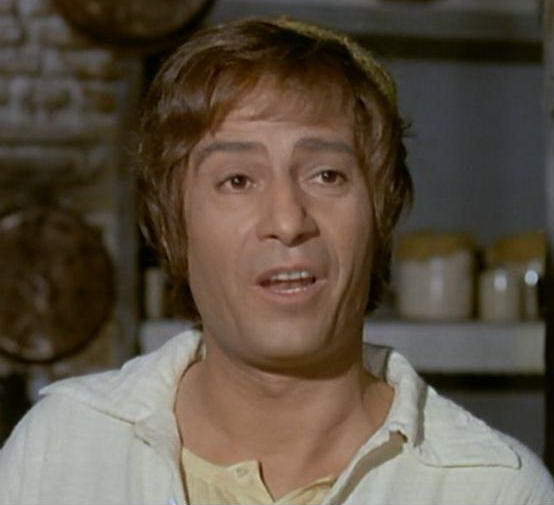
Manfredi in The Conspirators (1969)

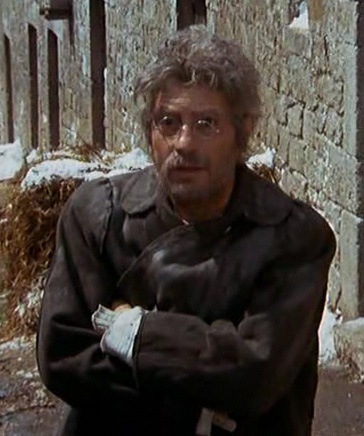
Manfredi as Geppetto in the TV series The Adventures of Pinocchio (1972)

Starting from the second half of the 1960s, Manfredi became a top actor at the Italian box office, starring in some of the most successful and critically acclaimed films in the Commedia all'italiana genre, often directed by Dino Risi. In 1969, with The Conspirators, he started a fruitful collaboration with the director Luigi Magni. In the same period he started collaborating, often uncredited, to the screenplays of his films.

In 1970, he enjoyed a large musical success with the Ettore Petrolini's song "Tanto pe' cantà"; the song premiered, out of competition, at the Sanremo Music Festival and it peaked at fourth place on the Italian hit parade. In 1971, he made his feature film debut as director with the semi-autobiographical Between Miracles, with which he got almost unanimous critical acclaim, winning the Best Film Work Award at the Cannes Film Festival, the Italian Golden Globe for Best First Feature, two Silver Ribbons (for best screenplay and best original story) and a special David di Donatello. In 1972 he got a major television success playing Geppetto in the Luigi Comencini's adaptation The Adventures of Pinocchio. In the 1970s and early 1980s, he continued alternating high-profile works and less ambitious comedies; among the most successful performances of the time, the emarginated immigrant of Bread and Chocolate (1973), the idealist worker of We All Loved Each Other So Much (1974), the old shanty town patriarch of Down and Dirty (1976), the Vatican's magistrate of In the Name of the Pope King (1977), the abusive coffee-seller in Café Express (1980).

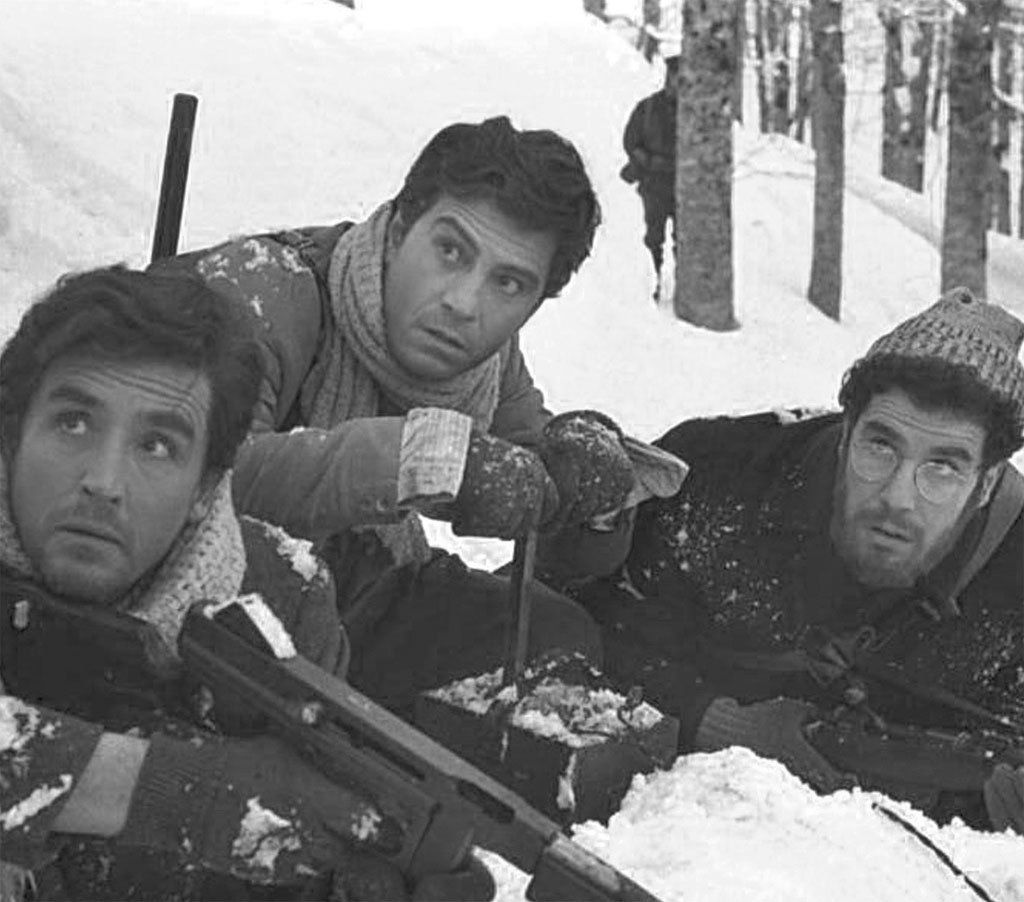
Manfredi (centre) with Vittorio Gassman and Stefano Satta Flores in We All Loved Each Other So Much (1974)

=== Later career ===
Following his last film as director (Portrait of a Woman, Nude) and two commercial hit films starred alongside Renato Pozzetto (Heads I Win, Tails You Lose and Questo e Quello), in the 1980s, Manfredi significantly slowed his cinema activities.

In 1983, he debuted as an author with the book Proverbi e altre cose romanesche, while in 1984, he signed his first work as playwright and stage director (Viva gli sposi), an activity in which he gradually focused. In 1990 he received a David di Donatello career award. In 1992, after having first accepted to be a candidate at the elections with the Pannella List, he withdrew his candidature to not give up his artistic commitments. In 1993, during the shooting of Un commissario a Roma, he suffered a hypoxia which compromised his memory functions. Starting from Un commissario a Roma his popularity revamped thanks to a series of successful RAI TV-series and miniseries, notably Linda e il brigadiere.

=== Last role and death ===
Manfredi's last role was Galapago, an almost mute stranger with no memory in Miguel Hermoso's Spanish drama film The End of a Mystery. On 7 July 2003, a few months after the release of the film, he was struck by a cerebral infarction in his home in Rome. In August, he received a Career Bianchi Prize at the Venice Film Festival. In September, an improvement allowed him to return home, but in December, he was hit by a new cerebral haemorrhage. After spending six months in a continuous alternation of improvements and deteriorations, he died on 4 June 2004, aged eighty-three years old.

== Personal life ==
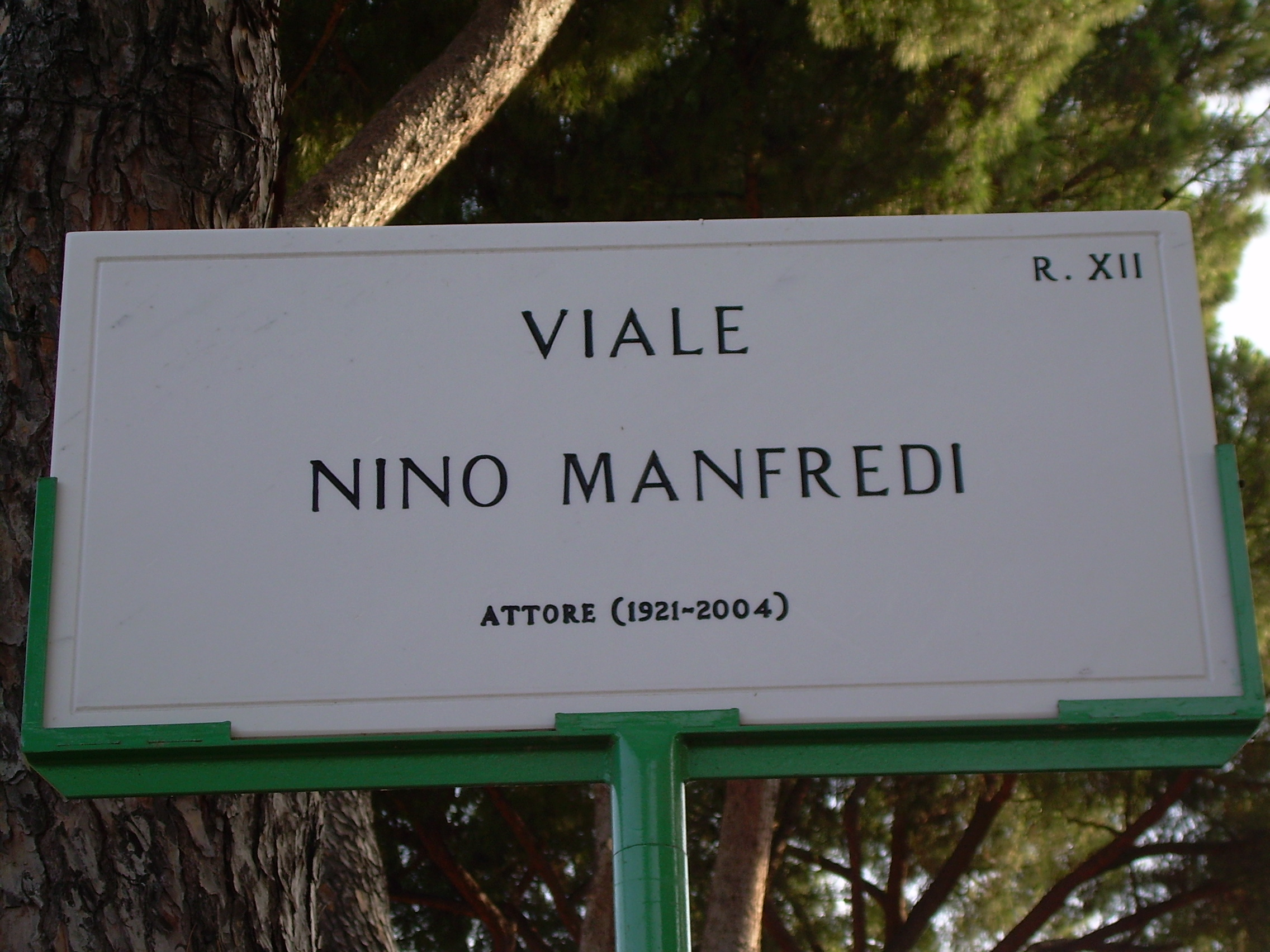
"Viale Nino Manfredi", a street named after him in Rome

Manfredi was married to model Erminia Ferrari from 1955 till his death. The couple had a son, Luca (who is a film and television director), and two daughters, Roberta (an actress, television presenter and producer) and Giovanna. He had another daughter, Tonina, from a Bulgarian woman.

From an early age, Manfredi suffered from a biliary disorder, which forced him to a very strict diet, and his meals often consisted of just light tea or caffè d'orzo. He was an atheist. Active in volunteering, in 1991, he was nominated Goodwill Ambassador for UNICEF.

== Legacy ==
In 2007, an asteroid (73453 Ninomanfredi) was named after him. In 2009, a Nino Manfredi Prize was established at the Nastro d’Argento Awards. Manfredi also named a theatre in Ostia, Rome.

On the occasion of the tenth anniversary of his death, in 2014, Manfredi was remembered by "Nino!", a series of events, held in various places including Los Angeles, New York, Rome and Paris, which included retrospectives, exhibitions, and the staging of an unreleased play of Manfredi.

In 2017, his son Luca Manfredi directed a biographical film about Manfredi's early years, In arte Nino; Manfredi was played by Elio Germano, while Miriam Leone played his wife Erminia.

== Filmography ==
=== Cinema ===
- The Monastery of Santa Chiara (1949) as Enrico
- Return to Naples (1949) as Francisco
- My Heart Sings (1951) as Enrico
- Viva il cinema! (1952) as Tonino's friend
- Good Folk's Sunday (1953) as Lello
- I Chose Love (1953)
- Prisoner in the Tower of Fire (1953) as Stornello
- Cavalcade of Song (1953)
- Laugh! Laugh! Laugh! (1954) as Signore che non vuole pagare (segment "Al Night Club Bar Zellette")
- Scandal in Sorrento (1955) as Sindaco di Sorrento (voice, uncredited)
- Non scherzare con le donne (1955) as Tifoso ciclista
- Revelation (1955) as Mario Giorgi
- Lo scapolo (1955) as Peppino
- Wild Love (1956) as Otello – il parrucchiere
- Guardia, guardia scelta, brigadiere e maresciallo (1956) as Paolo
- Toto, Peppino, and the Hussy (1956) as Raffaele, Gianni's friend
- Time of Vacation (1956) as Carletto
- Susanna Whipped Cream (1957) as Un ladro
- Femmine tre volte (1957) as Nando Martinoni
- Camping (1958) as Nino
- Pezzo, capopezzo e capitano (1958) as Pilota
- Adorabili e bugiarde (1958) as Mario
- Venice, the Moon and You (1958) as Toni
- Il bacio del sole (Don Vesuvio) (1958)
- Caporale di giornata (1958) as Corporal Enea Serafini
- Maid, Thief and Guard (1958) as Otello Cucchiaroni
- Carmela è una bambola (1958) as Antonio 'Totò' Improta
- I ragazzi dei Parioli (1959) as Giuseppe Spallotta
- Audace colpo dei soliti ignoti (1959) as Ugo Nardi aka Piede Amaro
- The Employee (1960) as Ferdinando 'Nando' Guida
- Toto, Fabrizi and the Young People Today (1960) (voice, uncredited)
- Le pillole di Ercole (1960) as dottor Pasqui
- Crimen (1960) as Quirino Filonzi
- Il carabiniere a cavallo (1961) as Franco Bartolucci
- The Last Judgment (1961) as Waiter
- On the Tiger's Back (1961) as Giacinto Rossi
- Roaring Years (1962) as Omero Battifiori
- I motorizzati (1962) as Nino Borsetti
- Of Wayward Love (1962) as the soldier (segment "L'avventura di un soldato")
- The Girl from Parma (1963) as Nino Meciotti
- The Executioner (1963) as José Luis Rodríguez
- I cuori infranti (1963) as Quirino (segment "E vissero felici")
- High Infidelity (1964) as Francesco (segment "Scandaloso")
- Il Gaucho (1964) as Stefano
- Countersex (1964) as Sandro Cioffi (segment "Cocaina di domenica") / Spadini (segment "Una donna d'affari")
- Le bambole (1965) as Giorgio (segment "La telefonata")
- Questa volta parliamo di uomini (1965) as Federico (segment "Un uomo d'onore"), Morgas (segment "Il lanciatore di coltelli"), Raffaelle (segment "Un uomo superiore"), Salvatore (segment "Un brav'uomo")
- I complessi (1965) as Quirino Raganelli (segment "Una Giornata decisiva")
- Thrilling (1965) as Nanni Galassi (segment "Il vittimista")
- I Knew Her Well (1965) as Cianfanna
- Made in Italy (1965) as Attilio Lamborecchia (segment "4 'Cittadini, stato e chiesa', episode 1")
- Me, Me, Me... and the Others (1966) as 'Millevache'
- Adultery Italian Style (1966) as Franco Finali
- Treasure of San Gennaro (1966) as Armandino Girasole / Dudu
- A Rose for Everyone (1967) as The doctor
- The Head of the Family (1967) as Marco
- Italian Secret Service (1968) as Natale Tartufato aka Capellone
- Torture Me But Kill Me with Kisses (1968) as Marino Balestrini
- Will Our Heroes Be Able to Find Their Friend Who Has Mysteriously Disappeared in Africa? (1968) as Oreste Sabatini
- I See Naked (1969) as Cacopardo / Angelo Perfili / Ercole / Voyeur / Phone-technician / Maurizio / Nanni
- The Conspirators (1969) as Cornacchia
- Operation Snafu (1970) as Rosolino Paternò
- Let's Have a Riot (1970) as Beretta (segment "Concerto a tre pifferi")
- Between Miracles (1971) as Benedetto Parisi
- Roma Bene (1971) as Il Commissario Quintilio Tartamella
- Trastevere (1971) as Carmelo Mazzullo
- In Love, Every Pleasure Has Its Pain (1971) as Nale
- The Assassin of Rome (1972) as Gino Girolimoni
- Lo chiameremo Andrea (1972) as Paolo Antonazzi
- Bread and Chocolate (1974) as Giovanni 'Nino' Garofoli
- We All Loved Each Other So Much (1974) as Antonio
- Eye of the Cat (1975) as Marcello Ferrari
- Down and Dirty (1975) as Giacinto Mazzatella
- Goodnight, Ladies and Gentlemen (1976) as Cardinale Caprettari (segment "Il Santo Soglio")
- Basta che non si sappia in giro (1976) as Enzo Lucarelli (segment "Il superiore") / Paolo Gallizzi (segment "L'equivoco")
- Strange Occasion (1976) as Antonio Pecoraro (segment "Cavalluccio Svedese, Il")
- In the Name of the Pope King (1977) as Monsignor Colombo da Privano
- The Payoff (1978) as Sasà Iovine
- A Dangerous Toy (1979) as Vittorio Barletta
- Gros-Câlin (1979) as Parisi
- Café Express (1980) as Michele Abbagnano
- Portrait of a Woman, Nude (1981) as Sandro
- Spaghetti House (1982) as Domenico Ceccacci
- Heads I Win, Tails You Lose (1982) as Beduino
- Questo e Quello (1983) as Doctor (segment "Questo... amore impossibile") / Alessandro Cipollini (segment "Quello... col basco rosso")
- Il tenente dei carabinieri (1986) as Colonnello Vinci
- Grandi magazzini (1986) as Marco Salviati
- Secondo Ponzio Pilato (1987) as Ponzio Pilato
- Helsinki Napoli All Night Long (1987) as Grandpa
- The Rogues (1987) as Il cieco
- Alberto Express (1990) as Le père d'Alberto
- In the Name of the Sovereign People (1991) as Angelo Brunetti, also known as Ciceruacchio
- Mima (1991) as Grandpa
- Colpo di luna (1995) as Salvatore
- The Flying Dutchman (1995) as Campanelli
- Grazie di tutto (1999) as Pietro
- La Carbonara (1999) as Cardinale
- Una milanese a Roma (2001) as Giordano
- Apri gli occhi e... sogna (2002) as Il barbone
- The End of a Mystery (2003) as Galapago
- L'apetta Giulia e la signora Vita (2003) as Bobo (voice) (final film role)

=== Television ===
- The Adventures of Pinocchio (1972) as Geppetto
- La vita di Gesù (1975)
- Julianus barát (1991) as Endre the Second
- Un commissario a Roma (series, 1992) as Commissario Franco Amidei
- Linda e il brigadiere (series, 1997) as Nino Fogliani
- Linda e il brigadiere 2 (series, 1998) as Nino Fogliani
- Dio ci ha creato gratis (1998) as Cardinal Forseca
- Linda, il brigadiere e... (series, 1999) as Nino Fogliani
- Meglio tardi che mai (1999) as Antonio Di Carlo
- Una storia qualunque (2000) as Michele
- Le ragioni del cuore (2002)
- Un difetto di famiglia (2002) as Francesco Gammarota
- Chiaroscuro (2003) as Sor Peppe
- La notte di Pasquino (2003) as Pasquino
- Un posto tranquillo (2003) as Padre Roberto

=== Director ===
- Of Wayward Love (segment "L'avventura di un soldato", 1962)
- Between Miracles (Per grazia ricevuta, 1970)
- Nudo di donna (1981)
