= Claudio Cirillo =

Italian cinematographer

Claudio Cirillo (31 August 1926) is an Italian cinematographer. He is best known for his collaborations with Ettore Scola, and work on prominent films such as Scent of a Woman (1974), We All Loved Each Other So Much (1974) and Crime Busters (1977).
