= An Italian in America =

- Directed by: Alberto Sordi
- Written by: Rodolfo Sonego; Alberto Sordi
- Produced by: Jacques Dorfmann
- Starring: Alberto Sordi; Vittorio De Sica
- Cinematography: Benito Frattari
- Music by: Piero Piccioni
- Release date: 1967
- Running time: 96 minutes
- Country: Italy
- Language: Italian

An Italian in America (Italian: Un italiano in America) is a 1967 Commedia all'italiana film co-written and directed by Alberto Sordi and starring the same Sordi opposite Vittorio De Sica. Screenwriter Rodolfo Sonego was inspired for the plot by the participation of one of his friends, the painter Salvatore Scarpitta, to the NBC program This Is Your Life.

== Plot ==
Giuseppe Marossi (Alberto Sordi), working in a Gulf gas station in Viterbo, Italy, receives a visit from an American television producer inviting him to New York to film his reunion with his long-lost father Lando Marossi (Vittorio De Sica) on a show based on This is Your Life. Lando had abandoned the family when Giuseppe was a child, and was assumed dead; in fact, he emigrated to America and became a wealthy businessman. Giuseppe accepts and has a joyous on-air reunion with Lando, followed by a cross-country road trip visiting Lando's properties and investments. These, however, turn out to be illusory or failed. It emerges that Lando is a swindler and gambler who went on the show to make money to pay his mobster creditors. During a confrontation with them in Las Vegas, it is Giuseppe who is beaten up while Lando absconds with Giuseppe's money and return ticket to Italy. Hoping to track down his father, Giuseppe travels to Lando's home in Memphis, which he finds empty. It is, however, across the street from a general store and gas station, which are managed by Lando's wife's sister (played by the amateur actress and Memphis belle Alice Conden). The two young people fall in love, and Giuseppe ends the film pumping gas at another Gulf station, but near the shore of the Mississippi River, with an American woman at his side.

== Cast ==
- Alberto Sordi as Giuseppe Marozzi
- Vittorio De Sica as Lando Marozzi
- Franco Valobra as Giuseppe's Communist friend
- Bill Dana as TV presenter
- Gray Frederickson
- Lou Perry
- Valentino Macchi
- Alice Conden
