= Strange Occasion =

- Directed by: Luigi Comencini; Nanni Loy; Luigi Magni
- Written by: Sergio Corbucci; Leo Benvenuti; Piero De Bernardi; Rodolfo Sonego
- Produced by: Fausto Saraceni
- Starring: Nino Manfredi; Stefania Sandrelli; Alberto Sordi; Paolo Villaggio
- Cinematography: Armando Nannuzzi; Aldo Tonti
- Edited by: Nino Baragli; Ruggero Mastroianni; Franco Fraticelli
- Music by: Piero Piccioni
- Distributed by: Cineriz
- Release date: 23 December 1976
- Running time: 120 minutes
- Country: Italy
- Language: Italian

Quelle strane occasioni, internationally released as Strange Occasion, is a 1976 Italian anthology comedy film directed by Luigi Comencini, Nanni Loy and Luigi Magni. Loy opted not to be credited for his segment, Italian Superman, which is shown as being directed by "Anonimo" (Anonymous).

== Plot ==
=== Italian Superman ===
Giobatta and Piera are a couple of poor Italian immigrants in the Netherlands, who barely earn a living selling castagnaccio to the locals. One night, Giobatta is robbed by a gang of muggers who, while checking his pockets, realize he is particularly well-endowed: they take him to the owner of a nightclub, who forcibly hires him as a live sex performer without Piera’s knowledge. While the new job improves the couple's livelihood, their sexual life suffers. When Piera finally learns about Giobatta's moonlighting, she allows him to continue on the condition that she shall be his partner female performer. However Giobatta is too shy to publicly perform with his own wife, failing to get an erection. The nightclub owner therefore demotes him to doorman and hires another male performer for Piera.

=== The Swedish Rocking Horse ===
When middle-aged architect Antonio Pecoraro is left home alone while his wife and daughter are away on vacation, he is visited by Kristina, the daughter of a Swedish friend of the family. That night, the now adult Kristina admits she never overcame the secret crush she harbored for Antonio as a child, and proceeds to seduce him. The next day, ignoring Antonio's traditionalist conception of sex, Kristina reveals that Antonio's wife Giovanna had previously conducted a three-month carnal affair with her father—which, according to Kristina, saved both marriages. When Giovanna returns, Antonio greets her coldly, hinting that he now knows the truth.

=== The Elevator ===
On the eve of Ferragosto, Monsignor Ascanio La Costa becomes trapped in an elevator with the young and attractive Donatella inside a large, deserted housing complex in Rome. Through an entire day of forced cohabitation, the pair develop a rapport, during which Donatella confides certain details of her sentimental life. During a power outage, the prelate and Donatella have sex in the pitch-black cabin. Once the elevator is back in service, he persuades her to forget the incident on the argument that it happened without their responsibility, due to being temporarily deprived of free will while stuck together in the elevator. However, he gives her at the same time his calling card and instructions on how to reach him for further appointments. At the end, it is furthermore revealed that the Monsignor was in the building on his way to meet his mistress.

== Cast ==
- Paolo Villaggio: Giobatta
- Nino Manfredi: Antonio Pecoraro
- Alberto Sordi: Mons. Ascanio La Costa
- Stefania Sandrelli: Donatella
- Olga Karlatos: Giovanna
- Beba Lončar: Vedova Adami
- Valeria Moriconi: Giobatta's wife
- Jinny Steffan: Cristina
