= Tiziana Pini =

Italian actress and television personality

- Born: 13 August 1958 (age 67); Sanremo, Italy
- Occupation: Actress

Tiziana Pini (born 13 August 1958) is an Italian actress and television personality.

== Life and career ==
Born in Sanremo, Italy, Pini started her career in 1976, when at eighteen years old she was chosen by Erminio Macario to enter his stage company for the comedy play Medico si fa per dire; still together with Macario she made her television debut in 1978, in the RAI variety show Macario più. In 1984 she co-hosted the Sanremo Music Festival alongside Pippo Baudo and Edi Angelillo. Pini also appeared in several films, mainly comedies, between the 1970s and the 1990s. She was nominated as Best New Actress at the 1983 David di Donatello Awards for her performance in Alberto Sordi's In viaggio con papà and in 1984 she received a nomination as Best Supporting Actress at the Nastro d'Argento Awards for her performance in Pupi Avati's A School Outing.

== Filmography ==
=== Film ===
- House of Pleasure for Women, directed by Pupi Avati (1976)
- Per vivere meglio, divertitevi con noi, directed by Flavio Mogherini (1978)
- Journey with Papa, directed by Alberto Sordi (1982)
- State buoni se potete, directed by Luigi Magni (1983)
- A School Outing, directed by Pupi Avati (1983)
- 7 chili in 7 giorni, directed by Luca Verdone (1986)
- Merry Christmas... Happy New Year, directed by Luigi Comencini (1989)
- Le comiche, directed by Neri Parenti (1990)
- The Raffle, directed by Francesco Laudadio (1991)
- Boom, directed by Andrea Zaccariello (1999)

=== Television ===
- Accadde ad Ankara – TV series (1979)
- Caccia al ladro d'autore – TV series, episode 1x04 (1985)
- Casa Vianello – TV series, episode 4x16 (1993)
- S.P.Q.R. – TV series, episode 1x02 (1998)
