= I complessi =

I Complessi
- Italian Film Poster
- Directed by: Dino Risi; Luigi Filippo D'Amico; Franco Rossi
- Written by: Leo Benvenuti; Piero De Bernardi; Marcello Fondato; Ruggero Maccari; Ettore Scola; Rodolfo Sonego; Alberto Sordi
- Produced by: Gianni Hecht Lucari
- Starring: Nino Manfredi; Ugo Tognazzi; Alberto Sordi
- Cinematography: Ennio Guarnieri; Mario Montuori
- Music by: Armando Trovaioli
- Release date: 15 August 1965
- Running time: 100 minutes
- Country: Italy
- Language: Italian

I complessi is a 1965 commedia all'italiana anthology film consisting of three episodes.

== Cast ==
Una giornata decisiva

- Nino Manfredi: Quirino Raganelli
- Ilaria Occhini: Gabriella
- Riccardo Garrone: Alvaro Morandini
- Umberto D'Orsi: Ernesto

Segment directed by Dino Risi, written by Marcello Fondato, Ruggero Maccari and Dino Risi.

Il complesso della schiava nubiana

- Ugo Tognazzi: prof. Gildo Beozi
- Claudie Lange: Erminia
- Paola Borboni: Baracchi-Croce, Beozi's assistant
- Nanda Primavera: Beozi's Mother-in-law
- Claudio Gora: Antiquary
- Carletto Sposito: Massimo Tabusso

Segment directed by Franco Rossi, written by Leonardo Benvenuti, Piero De Bernardi, Ettore Scola, Age & Scarpelli.

Guglielmo il dentone

- Alberto Sordi: Guglielmo Bertone
- Franco Fabrizi: Francesco Martello
- Romolo Valli: Father Baldini
- Armando Trovajoli: Himself
- Lelio Luttazzi: Himself
- Nanni Loy: Himself
- Vincenzo Talarico: Himself
- Alessandro Cutolo: Himself
- Edy Campagnoli: Herself
- Kessler Twins: Themselves
- Gaia Germani: Herself
- Leo J. Wollemborg: Himself
- Pina Cei: Atelier Fabiani's Owner
- Renato Terra: Contestant
- Ugo Pagliai: Contestant
- Piero Gerlini: Edoardo

Segment directed by Luigi Filippo D'Amico, written by Rodolfo Sonego and Alberto Sordi.
