= The Three Faces =

1965 Italian film

- Theatrical release poster
- Directed by: Michelangelo Antonioni; (segment "Il provino"); Mauro Bolognini; (segment "Gli amanti celebri"); Franco Indovina; (segment "Latin Lover")
- Written by: Michelangelo Antonioni; (segment "Il provino"); Tullio Pinelli; (segment "Gli amanti celebri"); Clive Exton; (segment "Gli amanti celebri"); Alberto Sordi; (segment "Latin Lover"); Rodolfo Sonego; (segment "Latin Lover"); Franco Indovina; (segment "Latin Lover")
- Produced by: Dino De Laurentiis
- Cinematography: Carlo Di Palma; (segment "Il provino"); Otello Martelli; (other segments)
- Edited by: Eraldo Da Roma; (segment "Il provino"); Nino Baragli; (other segments)
- Music by: Piero Piccioni
- Release date: 11 February 1965 (Italy)
- Running time: 117 minutes
- Country: Italy
- Language: Italian

The Three Faces (Italian: I tre volti) is a 1965 Italian anthology film consisting of three segments directed by Michelangelo Antonioni, Mauro Bolognini, and Franco Indovina, starring Soraya either as herself or in fictitious roles.

== Cast ==
"Il provino"

- Soraya as Herself
- Ivano Davoli as Davoli - Journalist
- Alfredo De Laurentiis as Himself
- Dino De Laurentiis as Himself
- Piero Tosi as Costumista
- Giorgio Sartarelli as Fotografo
- Ralph Serpe as Produttore

"Gli amanti celebri"

- Soraya as Linda
- Richard Harris as Robert
- Jean Rougeul as Speaker
- Esmeralda Ruspoli as Edda
- José Luis de Vilallonga as Rodolph

"Latin Lover"

- Soraya as Mrs Melville
- Alberto Sordi as Armando Tucci
- Nando Angelini as Fernando Angeli
- Goffredo Alessandrini as Direttore dell'agenzia
- Alberto Giubilo as 2nd journalist in Fiumicino
- Renato Tagliani

== Background ==
According to Antonioni, producer De Laurentiis had imposed severe cuts on his segment, which in the theatrically released version served as a "preface" (Italian "prefazione") to the other two segments.
