= Vacations in Majorca =

- Directed by: Giorgio Bianchi
- Written by: Vittorio Metz; Rodolfo Sonego; Roberto Gianviti
- Based on: story by Vittorio Metz; Roberto Gianviti; Rodolfo Sonego
- Produced by: Nino Crisman; Francesco Giaculli
- Starring: Alberto Sordi
- Cinematography: Alvaro Mancori
- Music by: Piero Piccioni
- Release date: 2 December 1959
- Running time: 98 minutes
- Country: Italy
- Language: Italian

Vacations in Majorca (Italian: Brevi amori a Palma di Majorca) is a 1959 Italian comedy film directed by Giorgio Bianchi.

== Plot ==
Anselmo Pandolfini lives in Palma de Mallorca. He meets a famous American diva Mary Moore who initially dislikes him, but persuades her to let him act as her bodyguard.

== Cast ==
- Alberto Sordi: Anselmo Pandolfini
- Gino Cervi: André Breton
- Belinda Lee: Mary Moore
- Dorian Gray: Hélène
- Antonio Cifariello: Ernesto
- Rossana Martini: Angela
- Mercedes Alonso: Clementina
- Vicente Parra: Gianni
- Giulio Paradisi: Miguel

== Production ==
The cast featured British actor Belinda Lee, then based in Europe.
