= Pardon, Are You For or Against? =

1966 Italian film by Alberto Sordi

Pardon, Are You For or Against? (Scusi, lei è favorevole o contrario?)
- Directed by: Alberto Sordi
- Written by: Alberto Sordi; Sergio Amidei; Dario Argento
- Starring: Alberto Sordi; Anita Ekberg; Bibi Andersson; Tina Aumont; Paola Pitagora; Silvana Mangano; Giulietta Masina
- Cinematography: Benito Frattari
- Music by: Piero Piccioni
- Release date: 1966
- Running time: 129 minutes
- Country: Italy
- Language: Italian

Pardon, Are You For or Against? (Italian: Scusi, lei è favorevole o contrario?) is a 1966 Italian comedy film written, directed by and starring Alberto Sordi.

The title refers to debates on the issue of divorce, still illegal in Italy at the time of the film's release.

== Plot ==
Tullio Conforti is a successful entrepreneur who is opposed to divorce on religious grounds. While claiming to be a role model, and that no other man is more faithful than him, he is de facto separated from his wife and has relations with many women.

== Cast ==
- Alberto Sordi as Tullio Conforti
- Silvana Mangano as Emanuela
- Giulietta Masina as Anna
- Anita Ekberg as Baroness Olga
- Paola Pitagora as Valeria Conforti
- Laura Antonelli as Piera
- Bibi Andersson as Ingrid
- Franca Marzi as Camilla
- Lina Alberti as Celeste
- Tina Aumont as Romina
- Mario Pisu as Baron Renato Santambrogio
- Eugene Walter as Igor
- Mirella Pamphili as Fiorella Conforti
- Maria Cumani Quasimodo as Baroness Cornianu
- Caterina Boratto as Agnese Frustalupi
- Enza Sampò as Interviewer
- Dario Argento as Priest
- Lino Banfi as Pharmaceutical sales representative
- Marco Tulli as Doorman
- Milena Milani as Herself
- Kitty Swan as Emanuela's employee
