= Franco Angrisano =

Italian actor (1926–1996)

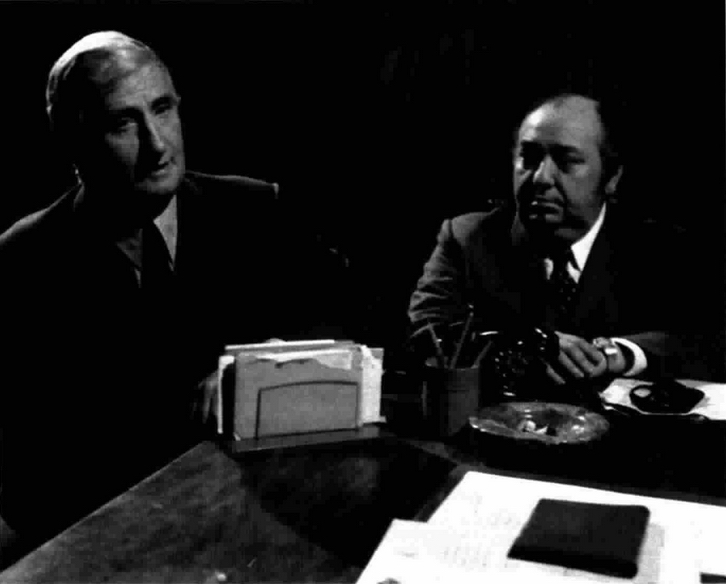
- Mario Carotenuto and Franco Angrisano (1972)
- Born: 10 May 1926; Potenza, Italy
- Died: 20 September 1996 (aged 70); Salerno, Italy
- Occupation: Actor

Franco Angrisano (10 May 1926 – 20 September 1996) was an Italian actor. He appeared in more than seventy films.

== Life and career ==
Born in Potenza, Angrisano was mainly active on stage, where he often worked with Eduardo De Filippo. He made his film debut in late 1950s, but his career in cinema was mainly confined to character roles. He was also active on television, in which he had roles of weight in several TV-series and television movies.

== Filmography ==
Year	Title	Role	Notes
1969	Gli infermieri della mutua		
1971	In the Name of the Italian People	Giudice Colombo	
1972	Guardami nuda		
1972	Shadows Unseen	Usciere	
1972	Decameron n° 3 - Le più belle donne del Boccaccio	The Abbott	(segment "Eyes Heavenward")
1972	Canterbury proibito	Bishop	(segment "Due suore")
1972	Il caso Pisciotta	Don Nitto	
1972	Avanti!	Arnoldo Trotta	
1973	My Brother Anastasia	Commissario De Felice	
1973	Counselor at Crime	Torrillo	
1973	Flatfoot	Commissario	
1973	Polvere di stelle	Fascist Party Secretary	
1973	The Great Kidnapping		
1973	My Name Is Nobody	Ferroviere	
1974	The Beast	Mafioso	
1974	Processo per direttissima	Professor Mario Ricciarini	
1975	The Sex Machine	Landlord	
1976	Goodnight, Ladies and Gentlemen	Brigadiere	Uncredited
1976	Passi furtivi in una notte boia	Marshal	
1977	Sette note in nero	First Cab Driver	
1979	Napoli... la camorra sfida, la città risponde	L'avvocato	
1980	Razza selvaggia		
1980	Una moglie, due amici, quattro amanti	Genaro Visentin	
1980	The Iron Hand of the Mafia / Mafia, una legge che non perdona	"Sic-Sic"	
1982	Monsignor	Priest In Confessional	
1982	Pronto... Lucia		
1983	Stangata napoletana		
1983	Benvenuta	Le Gardien de la Villa des Mystères	
1983	And the Ship Sails On	Il Cuoco	
1984	Cinderella '80	Rocco	
1985	Camorra		
1986	Detective School Dropouts	Uncle Baba	
1987	Ternosecco	Gargiulo	
1988	Chiari di luna	Padre Davide	
1988	Cavalli si nasce	Carmela	
1989	Vanille fraise	Le Chef Douanier	
1990	L'avaro	Don Paolini	
1991	Vacanze di Natale '91	Pistolesi	
1992	Once Upon a Crime	Train Passenger	
1993	Pacco, doppio pacco e contropaccotto		
1995	Il verificatore	Father	
