= Fumo di Londra =

- Directed by: Alberto Sordi
- Written by: Alberto Sordi; Sergio Amidei
- Produced by: Giorgio Bianchi
- Starring: Alberto Sordi
- Cinematography: Benito Frattari
- Edited by: Antonietta Zita
- Music by: Piero Piccioni
- Release date: 1966
- Running time: 131 min
- Countries: Italy; United Kingdom
- Languages: English; Italian

Fumo di Londra (internationally released as Smoke Over London and Gray Flannels) is a 1966 Italian comedy film written, directed and starred by Alberto Sordi. For his performance Sordi won the David di Donatello for Best Actor. This movie marked the directorial debut of Alberto Sordi.

== Plot ==
Dante Fontana is an antique dealer from Perugia infatuated with the culture of the British upper classes. His wife and relatives mock him and snub him, seeing him as a silly daydreamer doing no serious work. Undaunted, Dante plans a vacation to London to learn more about the culture he so admires. However, once in London, he struggles to fit in, is awkward, often makes mistakes that betray his Italian origins, attracting the scorn of the British upper classes he would like to impress. After taking part in a fox hunt, Dante is invited to the house of an English aristocrat who shows him a supposedly ancient Etruscan statuette. Dante says the object is fake and breaks it, provoking an angry reaction from the English, who open fire on him. Terrified, Dante hides with a group of hippies and joins them in a demonstration. Arrested, Dante is sent back to Italy, where he resumes his monotonous routine.

Belvoir Castle was the location (as the country-house of the Duchess of Bradford).

== Cast ==
- Alberto Sordi as Dante Fontana
- Fiona Lewis as Elizabeth
- Amy Dalby as Duchess of Bradford
- Alfredo Marchetti as Count Bolla
- Clara Bindi as The Wife
- Michael Trubshawe as The Colonel
- Jean St. Clair as Headmistress
