= Thrilling (film) =

- Directed by: Carlo Lizzani; Ettore Scola; Gian Luigi Polidoro
- Written by: Ruggero Maccari; Ettore Scola; Rodolfo Sonego
- Starring: Walter Chiari; Nino Manfredi; Alberto Sordi; Sylvia Koscina; Alexandra Stewart; Dorian Gray; Nicoletta Machiavelli; Tino Buazzelli
- Cinematography: Roberto Gerardi
- Music by: Bruno Nicolai; Ennio Morricone
- Release date: 21 October 1965
- Running time: 117 minutes
- Country: Italy
- Language: Italian

Thrilling is a 1965 Italian comedy film. The film is split into three distinct segments, each directed by a different director; namely Carlo Lizzani, Ettore Scola and Gian Luigi Polidoro.

== Cast ==
=== Il vittimista ===
- Directed by Ettore Scola
- Nino Manfredi as Nanni Galassi
- Alexandra Stewart as Frida
- Tino Buazzelli as The Shrink
- Magda Konopka as Luciana
- Milena Vukotic as The Laboratory Assistant

=== Sadik ===
- Directed by Gian Luigi Polidoro
- Walter Chiari as Bertazzi
- Dorian Gray as Veronique

=== L'autostrada del sole ===
- Directed by Carlo Lizzani
- Alberto Sordi as Fernando Boccetta
- Sylva Koscina as Paola
- Giampiero Albertini as Il Rosso
- Alessandro Cutolo as Eraldo
- Nicoletta Machiavelli
- Federico Boido
- Renato Terra
