= I Am an ESP =

- Directed by: Sergio Corbucci
- Written by: Bernardino Zapponi; Giovanni Romoli; Sergio Corbucci; Alberto Sordi
- Starring: Alberto Sordi
- Cinematography: Sergio d'Offizi
- Music by: Piero Piccioni
- Distributed by: Variety Distribution
- Release date: 1985
- Running time: 112 minutes
- Country: Italy
- Language: Italian

I Am an ESP (Italian: Sono un fenomeno paranormale, also known as I'm a Paranormal Phenomenon) is a 1985 Italian comedy film written and directed by Sergio Corbucci.

== Plot ==
Roberto Razzi, the skeptical and atheist host of the TV-program "Future", is a well-known debunker of pseudoscientists and gurus. During a travel in India, he will receive paranormal powers, that will put at risk his professional and sentimental life.

== Cast ==
- Alberto Sordi as Roberto Razzi
- Eleonora Brigliadori as Olga
- Elsa Martinelli as Carla Razzi
- Claudio Gora as Prof. Palmondi
- Maurizio Micheli as Priest
- Gianni Bonagura: De Angelis
- Donald Hodson as Babasciò
- Rocco Barocco as Maraja
- Ines Pellegrini as Concubine of Maraja
- Néstor Garay as TV owner
- Pippo Baudo as himself
