= The Scientific Cardplayer =

1972 film by Luigi Comencini

The Scientific Cardplayer Lo Scopone Scientifico
- Theatrical release poster by Renato Casaro
- Directed by: Luigi Comencini
- Screenplay by: Rodolfo Sonego
- Produced by: Dino De Laurentiis
- Starring: Alberto Sordi, Silvana Mangano, Joseph Cotten and Bette Davis
- Cinematography: Giuseppe Ruzzolini
- Edited by: Nino Baragli
- Music by: Piero Piccioni
- Production company: Dino de Laurentiis Cinematografica
- Release date: 1972
- Running time: 115 minutes
- Country: Italy
- Language: Italian

The Scientific Cardplayer, also known as The Scopone Game (Italian: Lo scopone scientifico), is a 1972 Italian comedy-drama film directed by Luigi Comencini. The screenplay was written by Rodolfo Sonego. In 2008, the film was included on the Italian Ministry of Cultural Heritage’s 100 Italian films to be saved, a list of 100 films that "have changed the collective memory of the country between 1942 and 1978."

== Plot ==
An aging and wealthy American woman journeys to Rome each year with her chauffeur George to play the card game scopone with destitute Peppino and his wife Antonia. The annual scenario remains unchanged: she donates the initial stakes, then ultimately wins the game, shattering the couple's dream of scoring a victory and improving their lot in life. Eventually their daughter Cleopatra seeks revenge on her parents' behalf.

== Production ==
Bette Davis was in the midst of a three-week vacation at the La Costa health spa in Carlsbad, California when she received the script. On 24-hour notice, she flew to Rome for filming, but did not learn that the dialogue was to be recorded in Italian until the first day of shooting.

This was the third on-screen pairing of Davis and Joseph Cotten. They had previously costarred in Beyond the Forest (1949) and Hush...Hush, Sweet Charlotte (1964).

== Cast ==
- Bette Davis (dubbed by Lia Zoppelli) as The Millionairess
- Joseph Cotten as George
- Alberto Sordi as Peppino
- Silvana Mangano as Antonia
- Antonella Demaggi (dubbed by Georgia Lepore) as Cleopatra
- Mario Carotenuto as The Professor
- Domenico Modugno as Righetto

== Production credits ==
- Produced by Dino De Laurentiis
- Original music by Piero Piccioni
- Cinematography by Giuseppe Ruzzolini
- Art direction by Luigi Scaccianoce
- Costume design by Bruna Parmesan

== Awards ==
- 1973 David di Donatello Award for Best Actor (Alberto Sordi, winner)
- 1973 David di Donatello Award for Best Actress (Silvana Mangano, winner)
- 1973 Italian National Syndicate of Film Journalists Nastro d'Argento for Best Supporting Actor (Mario Carotenuto, winner)
