= Acquitted for Having Committed the Deed =

- Directed by: Alberto Sordi
- Written by: Rodolfo Sonego; Alberto Sordi
- Produced by: Claudio Grassetti; Peter Shepherd
- Starring: Alberto Sordi; Angela Finocchiaro
- Cinematography: Armando Nannuzzi
- Edited by: Tatiana Casini Morigi
- Music by: Piero Piccioni
- Production company: Mito Film
- Distributed by: Filmauro
- Release date: 17 April 1992
- Running time: 118 minutes
- Country: Italy
- Language: Italian

Acquitted for Having Committed the Deed (Italian: Assolto per aver commesso il fatto) is a 1992 Italian comedy film directed by and starring Alberto Sordi. It also features Angela Finocchiaro and Lou Castel.

It was shot on location in Rome and Los Angeles. The film's sets were designed by the art director Marco Dentici.

== Synopsis ==
A former official of the SIAE acquires a vast empire of broadcasting companies.

== Cast ==
- Alberto Sordi as Emilio Garrone
- Angela Finocchiaro as Mariuccia
- Enzo Monteduro as Enzo
- David Byrd as Shapiro
- Lou Cutell as Hartman
- Robert Nadder as Spielberg
- Marco Predolin as Max
- Byron Chung as Kawabata
- Paul Fujimoto as Mishima
- Roberto Sbaratto as Serra
- Gianfranco Barra
- Franco Diogene
- Francesca Reggiani as Ilaria - segretaria di Serra
- Mauro Bosco as Bistolfi
- Will Gill Jr. as Butler
- Claudio Bertoni as Security Guard
- Flora Carosello as Portiera
- Sandra Collodel as Telecronista TV
- Elsa De Giorgi as Contessa Nicoletta
- Mary Dicorato as Rita
- Tiziana Kinkela as Journalist
- Monica Leofreddi as Giornalista RAI
- Mauro Leuce
- Rosanna Muzzi Magni as Contessa Guglielmint
- Bruno Vetti as Direttore Hotel Bristol

== Bibliography ==
- Claudio G. Fava. Alberto Sordi. Gremese Editore, 2003.
