= The Witness (1978 film) =

- French theatrical release poster
- Directed by: Jean-Pierre Mocky
- Written by: Rodolfo Sonego; Augusto Caminito; Sergio Amidei; Jean-Pierre Mocky; Alberto Sordi; Jacques Dreux
- Produced by: Jacques Dorfmann
- Starring: Alberto Sordi; Philippe Noiret
- Cinematography: Sergio D'Offizi
- Edited by: Michel Lewin
- Music by: Piero Piccioni
- Distributed by: Cinema International Corporation
- Release date: 20 September 1978
- Running time: 110 minutes
- Country: France
- Language: French

The Witness (French: Le Témoin, Italian: Il testimone) is a French-Italian crime-thriller film written and directed by Jean-Pierre Mocky and starring Alberto Sordi and Philippe Noiret. It is loosely based on the novel Shadow of a Doubt by Harrison Judd.

== Plot ==
Italian artist Antonio Berti is invited by his French friend Robert Maurisson to restore the paintings in the Reims Cathedral. He needs a model and selects Cathy, a teenage girl from the local church choir. Despite her angelic demeanor, the girl makes sexually explicit comments while posing for Antonio. One day, Cathy goes missing, and her dead body is later found in a canal, not far from an empty house owned by Maurisson. Antonio remembers seeing his friend Robert near the house on the night of the crime, but the latter denies it and has an alibi. Instead, the police turn their attention to Berti who is an outsider and cannot provide an alibi. Later, Robert privately confesses to Antonio, and suggests they both would escape to a country that does not have capital punishment. Cathy's father then mistakenly assassinates Maurisson, who was driving Berti's car. Having lost the only person who could prove his innocence, Antonio is convicted and sentenced to death.

== Cast ==
- Alberto Sordi as Antonio Berti
- Philippe Noiret as Robert Maurisson
- Roland Dubillard as Inspector Guerin
- Gisèle Préville as Madame Louise Maurisson
- Paul Crauchet as Cathy's father
- Madeleine Colin as Mrs. Valentine
- Dany Bernard as Le chasseur
- Sandra Dobrigna as Cathy Massis
- Gérard Hoffman as Inspector's assistant
- Dominique Zardi as Moignard
- Henri Attal as Le garde-chasse
- Jean-Claude Remoleux as Le paysan
- Consuelo Ferrara as Hélène
- Paul Müller as Le beau-frère de Maurisson

== Production ==
Initially, the director Mocky chose Jean Gabin for the leading role, that of a piano teacher accused of murdering a young girl. The actor agreed but said he wanted Philippe Noiret to be his screen partner. Noiret agreed as well but Gabin died during the pre-production stage. Noiret suggested Alberto Sordi, in that case the film could be a co-production with Italy. The profession of the protagonist was changed to be an art restorer, and the production was moved to Rome though several scenes were filmed in and around Reims where the action takes place. Sordi's participation posed another problem—there is no capital punishment in Italy, and screenwriter Sergio Amidei had to find an acceptable ending for the Italian audiences. Thus two endings were created: Sordi's character is guillotined in the French version, and the Italian version only alludes to it, and shows flashbacks with a smiling Sordi having good times in Reims.

Some scenes were shot at the forest in Verzy and the church in Taissy, both located in the Marne department.
