= Il marito =

Il marito (The Husband)
- Directed by: Nanni Loy; Gianni Puccini
- Written by: Alberto Sordi, Rodolfo Sonego, Ettore Scola, Nanni Loy, Gianni Puccini, Ruggero Maccari
- Produced by: Felice Zappulla
- Starring: Alberto Sordi, Luigi Tosi
- Cinematography: Roberto Gerardi
- Music by: Carlo Innocenzi
- Release date: 20 February 1958
- Running time: 100 min
- Country: Italy
- Language: Italian

Il marito (lit. transl. The Husband) is a 1958 Italian-Spanish comedy film directed by Nanni Loy and Gianni Puccini, at their second and last collaboration after Parola di ladro. Alberto Sordi, who was author of the story together with Rodolfo Sonego, submitted the script to Angelo Rizzoli, that was not at all enthusiastic about the subject. Later, he met a Spanish producer, married with eleven children, who recognized himself in the story, so the film, which was initially set in uptown Rome, was shot in Madrid. In Spain the film was released with the title El Marido.

== Plot ==
Alberto has an unbearable wife who treats him like a nerd and that forces him to satisfy every whim of her. But Alberto decides to get respect and to prove his masculinity, initially destroying the cello's wife, the object that she loved, and after betraying her with a young woman. When the wife deliberately shatters an important deal with a rich and Alberto old widow, her husband is about to kill her in despair, but he is resoundingly beaten by his wife and sent to the hospital. At the end of the story Alberto remains meek as a child and his wife will decide his every move in the future.

== Cast ==
- Alberto Sordi as Alberto Mariani
- Aurora Bautista as Elena, Alberto's wife
- Luigi Tosi as Ernesto Finardi
- Alberto De Amicis as Aurelio
- Carlo Ninchi as Monsignor
- Marcello Giorda as On. Tocci
- Pino Patti as Colonel
- Rosita Pisano as Sofia, Alberto's sister
- Mario Passante as Gargano

== Plot ==
The small entrepreneur Alberto Mariani (Alberto Sordi) marries graduated cellist Elena Bonfanti (Aurora Bautista). Elena is a woman with a flaw: wanting at home the constant presence of an intrusive mother and an intrusive sister. Married life becomes a prison for Alberto, among many waivers, loans, bills, late payments and missed contracts.
