= A Common Sense of Modesty =

- Directed by: Alberto Sordi
- Written by: Alberto Sordi; Rodolfo Sonego
- Produced by: Fausto Saraceni
- Starring: Alberto Sordi; Claudia Cardinale; Philippe Noiret; Cochi Ponzoni; Florinda Bolkan
- Cinematography: Luigi Kuveiller; Giuseppe Ruzzolini
- Edited by: Tatiana Casini Morigi
- Music by: Piero Piccioni
- Distributed by: Medusa Film
- Release date: 1976
- Running time: 126 minutes
- Country: Italy
- Language: Italian

A Common Sense of Modesty (Italian: Il comune senso del pudore) is a 1976 Italian anthology comedy film directed by Alberto Sordi and starring Sordi, Claudia Cardinale and Philippe Noiret.

== Plot ==
The film consists of four segments. The plot centers on the changes in morality that involved Italian society in the 1970s, mainly focusing on the widespread circulation of erotic movies and magazines.

=== First segment ===
A mature worker, Giacinto, decides to celebrate his silver wedding anniversary bringing his wife Erminia to the cinema after a long time. Wandering around Rome, they innocently fall into a number of erotic movies. The couple is initially shocked, but soon starts to be somehow fascinated by the sexual content.

=== Second segment ===
Ottavio Caramessa, a small-town teacher and writer, is hired as a director by a pornographic magazine, jumping suddenly from rags to riches with the help of his extrovert typist, Loredana. He is soon arrested but has no regrets, being certain to fight a noble fight against obscurantism.

=== Third segment ===
Tiziano Ballarin, the local magistrate of a small town in Veneto, takes strict measures against adult magazines. While the village is excited by his moralistic – and in some cases hypocritical – campaign, Tiziano's wife, Armida, becomes the target of one of the magazines her husband harshly fights.

=== Fourth segment ===
The award-winning German actress Ingrid Streissberg refuses to shoot a sodomy scene in a film adaptation of Lady Chatterley's Lover, produced by the hot tempered Giuseppe Costanzo (somewhat inspired by Dino De Laurentiis). Having invested a great amount of money, he tries everything to convince the star, and even hires a "group of experts" – among which a self-styled progressive priest – to assert the considerable social and cultural relevance of the scene.

=== Epilogue ===
The day of the premiere, all the characters express their favorable opinion about the movie.

== Cast ==
First segment

- Alberto Sordi as Giacinto Colonna
- Rossana Di Lorenzo as Erminia Colonna
- Enrico Marciani as Jolly Cinema director
- Macha Magall as the Countess in La cavalcata
- Franca Scagnetti as trattoria waitress

Second segment

- Cochi Ponzoni as prof. Ottavio Caramessa
- Florinda Bolkan as Loredana Davoli
- Gisela Hahn as Ursula Keller
- Silvia Dionisio as Orchidea
- Giò Stajano as fashion photographer

Third segment

- Claudia Cardinale as Armida Ballarin
- Pino Colizzi as Tiziano Ballarin

Fourth segment

- Philippe Noiret as Giuseppe Costanzo
- Dagmar Lassander as Ingrid Streissberg
- David Warbeck as Mellors
- Renzo Marignano as Lady Chatterley 76 director
- Giacomo Furia as Lady Chatterley 76 production manager
- Armando Brancia as Mainardi
- Manfred Freyberger as Ingrid's husband
- Ugo Gregoretti as critic
- Giulio Cesare Castello as second critic
- Marina Cicogna as production advisor
- Jimmy il Fenomeno as himself

== Production ==
The film was announced by Cineriz in 1975, as an omnibus comedy film starring Sordi, Nino Manfredi, Monica Vitti and Paolo Villaggio, each one directing his segment.

== Release ==
The film was released in Italian cinemas by Cineriz on 10 April 1976.

== Reception ==
Film historian Rémi Fournier Lanzoni described A Common Sense of Modesty as "a courageous film, as it represented a difficult subject and in particular the immaturity of an Italian public poorly prepared to face the amorality of the pornographic film industry and the subsequent sottocultura (mass subculture) it provided". Domestically, the film was a box office success, grossing over 1,700 million lire.

== See also ==
- List of Italian films of 1976
