= Everybody in Jail =

- Directed by: Alberto Sordi
- Written by: Alberto Sordi; Rodolfo Sonego; Augusto Caminito
- Produced by: Augusto Caminito
- Starring: Alberto Sordi; Joe Pesci; Dalila Di Lazzaro; Giorgia Moll
- Cinematography: Sergio D'Offizi
- Edited by: Tatiana Casini
- Music by: Piero Piccioni
- Distributed by: Variety Distribution
- Release date: 1984
- Running time: 110 min
- Country: Italy
- Language: Italian

Tutti dentro, internationally released as Everybody in Jail, is a 1984 Italian comedy film written, starred and directed by Alberto Sordi. The main character, a hyperactive, vain and logorrheic judge, is referred as one of the most famous fictional judges in the Italian collective imagination.

== Plot ==
The judge Annibale Salvemini is an incorruptible magistrate of Rome who, although close to retirement, does not intend to show any sign of weakness. He continues his severe work and continues feeding without pity all the poor people that comes within range, including of course the criminals. All his colleagues admire him, including his girlfriend with whom he is to marry. But also an honest judge and moralist like Annibale has secrets. In fact he, in addition to his life full of lies and worldliness, has entered into an agreement with an American mafia boss: Corrado Parisi. In fact, Annibale was forced against his will to accept the assignment to not send to jail the whole company of the boss, who is preparing a shady traffic. Annibale eventually tries to rebel, but can not make it in time for the television journalists discover it. Comments are added to the scandal of the best friends of Annibale and his esteemed colleagues of the court immediately condemn him as the worst of all parasites. The life of Annibale is destroyed in one fell swoop.

== Cast ==
- Alberto Sordi as Annibale Salvemini
- Joe Pesci as Corrado Parisi
- Dalila Di Lazzaro as Iris Del Monte
- Giorgia Moll as Giovanna Salvemini
- Armando Francioli as Enrico Patellaro
- Tino Bianchi as Counsilor Vanzetti
- Franco Scandurra as General Attorney
- Marisa Solinas as Luisella
- Giordano Falzoni as Prior
- Gianni Rizzo as Euclide
- Franco Scandurra as Attorney General
- Cristiano Audone as Angelo Mariotti
- Gérard Landry as Claudio Ferrero
- Victoria Zinny as Salvemini's friend
