= Journey with Papa =

- Directed by: Alberto Sordi
- Written by: Rodolfo Sonego; Alberto Sordi; Carlo Verdone; Augusto Caminito
- Produced by: Goffredo Lombardo
- Starring: Alberto Sordi; Carlo Verdone; Edi Angelillo; Ugo Bologna; Flora Carabella; Giuseppe Mannajuolo; Margit Evelyn Newton; Tiziana Pini; Giuliana Calandra; Angelo Infanti
- Cinematography: Sergio D'Offizi
- Edited by: Tatiana Casini Morigi
- Music by: Piero Piccioni
- Distributed by: Variety Distribution
- Release date: 1982
- Running time: 118 min
- Country: Italy
- Language: Italian

Journey with Papa (Italian: In viaggio con papà) is a 1982 Italian road comedy film directed by Alberto Sordi.

== Plot ==
Armando does not spend much time with his shy son Cristiano, so he decides to go with him a beach holiday. This is the first occasion for years for the two to know each other: Cristiano is a naif, idealist boy, while Armando is an egocentric and hedonist mature businessman. During the trip the two meet various people, amongst which a wealthy friend and his wife, who betrays her husband with Armando. Cristiano accidentally discovers the relationship, generating an uproar and causing Armando to lose an important deal. They also visit Cristiano's mother and Armando's ex-wife, who lives with a writer and has caused decadence in the family. Armando then has a definitive rupture with his young lover, who leaves him because of his egoism, and has sex with Cristiano (ignorant of the girl's relationship with his father). Armando, having known of the encounter, at first seems to abruptly leave Cristiano on the road, but ultimately decides to go on with the trip.

== Cast ==
- Alberto Sordi as Armando D'Ambrosi
- Carlo Verdone as Cristiano D'Ambrosi
- Edi Angelillo as Soraya Canegatti
- Giuliana Calandra as Rita Canegatti
- Tiziana Pini as Federica Benedetti
- Ugo Bologna as Eng. Rinaldo Benedetti
- Angelo Infanti as Gianni
- Maria Pia Monicelli as Fausta
- Flora Carabella as Luciana D'Ambrosi
- Francesca Ventura as Valentina D'Ambrosi
- Gabriele Torrei as the Professor
- Margit Evelyn Newton as Billy
- Orsetta Gregoretti as Tiziana
- Paola Rinaldi as Carmela
- Ivana Milan as Marika
- Ester Carloni as Palmira
- Victoria Zinny as Susanna

== See also ==
- List of Italian films of 1982
