= A Difficult Life =

A Difficult Life (Una vita difficile)
- Directed by: Dino Risi
- Written by: Rodolfo Sonego
- Produced by: Dino De Laurentiis
- Starring: Alberto Sordi; Lea Massari; Franco Fabrizi; Claudio Gora
- Cinematography: Leonida Barboni
- Music by: Carlo Savina
- Release date: 19 December 1961
- Running time: 118 minutes
- Country: Italy
- Language: Italian
- Box office: $71,257 (2023 re-release)

A Difficult Life (Italian: Una vita difficile) is a Commedia all'italiana or Italian-style comedy film directed by Dino Risi in 1961. In 2008, the film was included on the Italian Ministry of Cultural Heritage’s 100 Italian films to be saved, a list of 100 films that "have changed the collective memory of the country between 1942 and 1978."

== Plot ==
The film tells the story of Italian politics from 1944 to 1960, from the poverty of World War II to the end of fascism and the birth of the Italian Republic and the rise of the Italian Communist Party. It follows the life of Silvio, who strongly believes his political activism should be rewarded but eventually realizes that the Italy he once knew has changed and he must change with it.

In 1944, Roman student Silvio Magnozzi (Alberto Sordi), is a second lieutenant in the Royal Army serving near Lake Como. After the Italian surrender on September 8, 1943, the Italian king abandons his army and flees south. Silvio joins a local partisan group to continue fighting the Nazis still occupying the Italian countryside. Looking for a safe place to stay, he is sent to a hotel. He is quickly discovered by a German soldier who intends to shoot him on the spot. Elena (Lea Massari), the daughter of the hotel owner, saves his life by killing the German with an iron. She guides him to a safe place: the mill owned by her late grandparents. For three months, he and Elena live as lovers. He eventually sneaks out away without saying goodbye and joins back up with the partisans.

After the liberation, Silvio returns to Rome where he works as a journalist at "The Worker," a poorly funded communist newspaper. Seven months after the war ends, Silvio and his friend Franco travel to Lombardy on assignment for the newspaper. Silvio winds up in the same town in which he met Elena so arranges to see her again. She agrees to live with him in Rome despite his extremely modest income and poor prospects.

On the day of the 1946 referendum deciding whether Italy would become a republic or remain a monarchy, Elena and Silvio are turned away from several different restaurants after trying to obtain a meal on credit. They run into a friend of Elena's who invites them to dinner at the home of an elderly Italian princess. The table is filled with snobby aristocrats anxiously awaiting the results of the referendum. They explain that they only allowed them to dinner because they could not have a table with only 13 people. Silvio barely refrains from openly declaring his republican faith in order not to give up their first real meal in days. Finally, the victory of the republic is announced and everyone but Elena and Silvio leave the table devastated at the results of the referendum.

Silvio and Elena eventually marry and have a son named Paolo. Their lives proceed with difficulty because Silvio, not wanting to compromise his political ideals, refuses to obtain a better paying job. His journalistic career comes to an end when he is arrested for libel after publishing an unverified story about a group of wealthy industrialists. In 1948, Silvio is sentenced to 2.5 years in prison for rioting after an assassination attempt on Togliatti, a popular communist leader. While in prison, he writes a novel called "A Difficult Life."

After his release, Elena suggests he finish his degree and move to Cantù-Cermenate where her mother could get him a permanent job with a good salary. Silvio tries to go back to his old job at the newspaper, but eventually agrees to take the architecture exam. He winds up failing the test, getting drunk and telling Elena that he has only ever felt physical attraction for her because she is too ignorant to understand him. Hurt and disappointed, Elena disappears from Silvio's life.

Two years pass and we find Silvio intent on publishing his novel. He is told that his writing is mediocre and uninteresting so he approaches well-known directors and actors (Alessandro Blasetti, Silvana Mangano and Vittorio Gassman at Cinecitta, all of whom refuse him because his book is too critical of the government. "There is a generation ignoring the facts of what I'm describing even though they must know them," he says. He learns of Elena's whereabouts and travels to Viareggio to win her back. He drunkenly begs Elena to come back but she explains that love doesn't matter to her anymore, only economic security. "It's easy to make money like all these people do. What is more difficult, to write an ugly novel, or to sell household appliances?" he asks. Elena storms away and Silvio vents his bitterness by spitting on luxury cars circulating in the town and shouting at tourists.

Many years later in 1961, the funeral of Elena's mother Amalia takes place in Lombardy. Silvio, to everyone's surprise, shows up behind the wheel of a luxury car. He begs Elena to take him back, stating that he has found a permanent job and set aside his political ideas to seek economic stability. Elena is moved at seeing the mill where they had spent happy days and decides to return with him.

The film ends with a party organized by the businessman Bracci, who hired Silvio as a secretary. Silvio is now able to afford luxuries like a fur coat and a car, but is forced to perform all kinds of humiliating tasks for his boss. Bracci ridicules Silvio in front of the guests and Elena by spraying seltzer in his face. Unable to bear this last affront, Silvio slaps Bracci, making him fall into the pool. He and Elena leave the party and walk home.

== Cast ==
- Alberto Sordi: Silvio Magnozzi
- Lea Massari: Elena Pavinato
- Franco Fabrizi: Franco Simonini
- Lina Volonghi: Amalia Pavinato
- Claudio Gora: Commendator Bracci
- Antonio Centa: Carlo
- Loredana Nusciak: Giovanna
- Daniele Vargas: Marquis Capperoni
- Franco Scandurra: President of the examination board
- Mino Doro: Ragana

== Production ==
Filming took place in part on Lake Como in Lenno (Tremezzina) and between Lierna and Varenna. The film opens at the Golfo di Venere beach. The town by the windmill where Elena and Silvio spent their first months together was filmed at Cerano d’Intelvi near the Telo River. The famous scene of spitting on cars, although in the film it is said that it is set in Viareggio, was actually shot on the seaside avenue of Ronchi, in the district of Marina di Massa.

The actor playing the German soldier killed by Elena was Borante Domizlaff. During the Second World War, he served in the SS security service (SD) as a Sturmbannführer (major). During the German occupation of Rome, Domizlaff participated in the organization and execution of the massacre of the Fosse Ardeatine under the orders of Lieutenant Colonel Herbert Kappler. Domizlaff was one of the defendants in the trial held after the war, which ended in 1948 with a sentence of life imprisonment of Kappler alone. Domizlaff and the rest of Kappler's officers were acquitted.

== Famous scenes ==
Some scenes are famous in the history of Italian cinema: the dinner at the princess' palace during the referendum of the Italian Republic; when Silvio asks a shepherd guard, "Dimmi, pastore, tu sei felice?" (Tell me, are you happy?); when a drunken Silvio spits at all the cars that drive by on the road after his wife had escaped from a night club; when Silvio visits Cinecitta and asks famous actors to make a movie of his book.
