= The President of Borgorosso Football Club =

- Directed by: Luigi Filippo D'Amico
- Written by: Sergio Amidei; Alberto Sordi; Adriano Zecca
- Starring: Alberto Sordi; Tina Lattanzi; Margarita Lozano
- Cinematography: Sante Achilli
- Edited by: Antonio Siciliano
- Music by: Piero Piccioni
- Production company: Produzioni Atlas Consorziate
- Release date: 1970
- Running time: 115 minutes
- Country: Italy
- Language: Italian

The President of Borgorosso Football Club (Italian: Il presidente del Borgorosso Football Club) is a 1970 Italian sports comedy film directed by Luigi Filippo D'Amico and starring Alberto Sordi, Tina Lattanzi and Margarita Lozano.

The film was mostly shot in the Province of Ravenna, using football stadiums in Bagnacavallo and Lugo as well as the home of Molinella Calcio 1911. The film's sets were designed by the art director Umberto Turco.

Although not clearly specified, the film refers to the history of a football club based in Cesena, Emilia-Romagna, that reached Serie A in the 1970s, achieving a best result of sixth place in 1975–76 Serie A season, a result that allowed it to compete in the 1976–77 UEFA Cup season the following year, equivalent to today's Europa League. In total, Cesena Football Club played 13 seasons in Serie A from 1973 to 2015. It currently holds first place in Serie B for the 2025–26 Serie B season season, with the stated goal to return to Serie A.

== Synopsis ==
After inheriting a small-town football club in Romagna from his long-estranged father, Vatican official Benito Fornaciari shows little interest despite the club being promoted shortly afterwards. However, after selling several top players provokes a riot in the town, he has a damascene conversion and begins to plough huge amounts of money in the club and hires a supposedly brilliant Peruvian coach. When he proves to be inept and the club loses several games at the start of the new season, Fornaciari himself takes over control of the team from the bench. This leads to a dramatic surge in form as the club win match after match, with Fornaciari rallying the fans in a populist manner. He takes this too far during a local derby, provoking a pitch invasion and major damage to a rival team's stadium.

The ensuing trouble, including a fine and a points deduction, leads a rival consortium to try and oust Fornaciari as president. However, he counters by signing Omar Sívori for Borgorosso and is acclaimed by the supporters once more. The film ends with Fornaciari leading a convoy of the team and their supporters to an away game, in exactly the same style his father had done at the beginning.

The film is known to the Italian public for the sheer amount of stereotypes that depict the Italian society of the 1970s. Examples of this include the fraud Italian-Peruvian manager, who puts on a fake South American accent to fool the president, and the overwhelming presence of the Catholic Church, represented by the priest who rushes the weekly mass to make sure he can attend the match.

== Cast ==
- Alberto Sordi as Benito Fornaciari, Libero Fornaciari
- Tina Lattanzi as Amelia Fornaciari
- Margarita Lozano as Erminia
- Daniele Vargas as Don Regazzoni
- Franco Accatino as Celestino Guardavaccaro
- Carlo Taranto as José Buonservizi
- Dante Cleri as ragioniere Quintino Braglia
- Carla Mancini as la moglie di uno dei calciatori
- Elena Pedemonte as signora Guardavaccaro
- Omar Sívori as himself
- Giuliano Todeschini as farmacista
- Edgardo Siroli as Scipione il barista
- Francesco Sormano as lo zio Monsignor Montanari
- Teodoro Corrà as il medico della squadra
- Rosita Toros as la moglie del giocatore Zanon
- Aldo Bet as himself
- Sergio Santarini as himself
- Giorgio Ghezzi as himself
- Dino Magli as Trinca

== Bibliography ==
- Claudio G. Fava. Alberto Sordi. Gremese Editore, 2003.
