= A Taxi Driver in New York =

1987 film

- Directed by: Alberto Sordi
- Screenplay by: Rodolfo Sonego; Alberto Sordi
- Produced by: Fulvio Lucisano
- Starring: Alberto Sordi; Anna Longhi; Dom DeLuise
- Cinematography: Giuseppe Ruzzolini
- Edited by: Tatiana Casini Morigi
- Music by: Piero Piccioni
- Release date: 1987
- Country: Italy
- Language: Italian

A Taxi Driver in New York (Italian: Un tassinaro a New York) is a 1987 comedy film co-written and directed by Alberto Sordi. It is the sequel of Il tassinaro (1983).

== Plot ==
After witnessing the mafia execution of a wealthy customer, Roman taxi driver Pietro Marchetti along with his wife Teresa travel to New York City to visit their son. Pietro is apprehended a few days afterwards by the police, and goes into hiding after the mafia discovers his location. Pietro is given a fake identity as a taxi driver in New York, and attempts to navigate driving a taxi in the United States while evading the mafia, as well as trying to find a job for his son.

== Cast ==
- Alberto Sordi as Pietro Marchetti
- Anna Longhi as Teresa Marchetti
- Dom DeLuise as Captain Favretto
- George Gaynes as Admiral
- Buffy Dee as Don Vincenzo
- Bruno Corazzari as Alfredo Campana
- Egidio Termine as Francesco Marchetti
- Sasha D'Arc as Michael
- Antonio Juorio as Pablo

== Production ==
The film was produced by IIF and RAI. It was shot between Rome, New York and Miami.

== Reception ==
The film was a box office disappointment, grossing about 515 million lire. La Repubblica film critic Tullio Kezich panned the film, writing: "by doing stuff like this", Sordi "is really hurting his image as a top entertainer." Giovanni Grazzini from Corriere della Sera wrote: "It fails as a satirical thriller, offers very few opportunities to smile, is slow-paced, [and] has an outdated style."
