= Where Are You Going on Holiday? =

Where Are You Going on Holiday? (Dove vai in vacanza?)
- Directed by: Mauro Bolognini; Luciano Salce; Alberto Sordi
- Written by: Alberto Sordi; Rodolfo Sonego; Age & Scarpelli; Luciano Salce; Sandro Continenza; Ruggero Maccari; Mauro Bolognini
- Starring: Alberto Sordi; Ugo Tognazzi; Paolo Villaggio; Stefania Sandrelli
- Cinematography: Sergio D'Offizi; Danilo Desideri; Luciano Tovoli
- Edited by: Antonio Siciliano; Nino Baragli
- Music by: Ennio Morricone; Piero Piccioni
- Release date: 1978
- Running time: 153 minutes
- Country: Italy
- Language: Italian-English

Where Are You Going on Holiday, also known as Dove vai in vacanza?, is a 1978 Italian anthology comedy film directed by Mauro Bolognini, Luciano Salce and Alberto Sordi.

== Plot ==
The film is divided into three episodes.

=== Sarò tutta per te ===
Enrico intends to recover the loving relationship with his ex-girlfriend Giuliana. She agrees and the two go in the house of her, but all of a sudden Enrico realizes he is not alone. In fact the young friends of Giuliana have reached the villa in the evening and plan many evening parties: typical of the flower children of that period. Enrico, on the threshold of fifty, feels him excluded and displaced, completely alien to the new juvenile behavior and his only instinct is to make love with Giuliana. When she agrees exasperated the poor Enrico blatantly fails to satisfy her in an embrace and so their relationship breaks down again.

=== Sì buana ===
Arturo finds employment as an improvised tour guide for a cheap travel agency, where he works under the assumed name "Wilson" to hide his Italian roots. During an organized safari, he is approached by one of the clients, a wealthy businessman named Colombi, who bribes Wilson to illegally procure a lion for him to hunt. Though initially reluctant, Wilson is eventually persuaded by Colombi's trophy wife, who also tries to convince him to shoot her husband under the appearance of a hunting accident, in exchange for a share of her insurance money. Wilson's plan is to take Colombi to a lion who died of its own, making him believe he killed it himself; however, the carcass attracts a living lion, which attacks the group. In the commotion, Colombi is fatally shot by his wife.

The episode is delivered in a flashback as a drunken Wilson tells the whole story to a well-mannered gentleman, who turns out to be the insurance agent investigating Colombi's death. Having inadvertently confessed to the whole ruse, Wilson loses the promised insurance share as well as Colombi's bribe.

=== Le vacanze intelligenti ===
The simpletons greengrocers Remo and Augusta are convinced by their three sons to embark on a tour that includes visits to Italy in museums, churches, theaters and places of modern art. The two don't want this, but they're so proud of the professional skills of their children who decide to deal with this sacrifice. So Augusta and Remo set out on an Etruscan necropolis and then to many other destinations to Venice Biennale, not understanding anything about modern art or futurists concerts. Remo and Augusta however are increasingly convinced that the children have decided this trip for their own good, and so they continue until the two get fed up and decide to go back to their old life. Back home, they discover that the furniture is completely changed and has become exactly like that of the modern houses of the hippies of the Seventies. The two simpletons, while regretting the past dear, also accept this deprivation.

== Cast ==
Sarò tutta per te

(segment directed by Mauro Bolognini)

- Ugo Tognazzi: Enrico
- Stefania Sandrelli: Giuliana
- Pietro Brambilla: Tommaso
- Clara Colosimo: Virginia
- Lorraine De Selle: ragazza al telefono
- Ricky Tognazzi: amico di Giuliana
- Rodolfo Bigotti: Fulvio
- Elisabetta Pozzi: amica di Giuliana

Sì buana

(segment directed by Luciano Salce)

- Paolo Villaggio: Arturo alias "Wilson"
- Gigi Reder: Dott. Panunti
- Anna Maria Rizzoli: Margherita
- Daniele Vargas: Cav. Ciccio Colombi
- Paolo Paoloni: agent Lloyd

Le vacanze intelligenti

(segment directed by Alberto Sordi)

- Alberto Sordi: Remo Proietti
- Anna Longhi: his wife Augusta
- Evelina Nazzari: Pasquina
- Stefania Spugnini: Romolina
