= Il disco volante =

- Directed by: Tinto Brass
- Written by: Rodolfo Sonego
- Produced by: Dino De Laurentiis
- Starring: Alberto Sordi
- Cinematography: Bruno Barcarol
- Music by: Piero Piccioni
- Release date: 23 December 1964
- Running time: 94 minutes
- Country: Italy
- Language: Italian

Il disco volante is a 1964 Italian comic science fiction film with mockumentary elements directed by Tinto Brass and starring Alberto Sordi. The film features the renowned comedian in four distinct roles as a dim-witted Carabinieri brigadiere, a cheesepairing accountant, a decadent count, and an alcoholic priest. Involving characters from different social strata, Il disco volante is effectively a satire of the Italian society, particularly the people of Brass's adopted home region Veneto.

== Plot ==
The sergeant of the Carabinieri of a Venetian village is charged with carrying out investigations on the arrival of a UFO of extraterrestrial origin. During the investigation he finds himself questioning a group of people who claim to have actually seen the Martians. In reality, only Vittoria, a poor widowed peasant with many children, manages to capture a Martian, which she sells to her effeminate master. However, his mother suppresses the Martian, accuses the peasant woman of fraud, and has her son sent to an asylum. Eventually, other characters involved in the story arrive, including the sergeant, as they are all deemed visionaries. Consequently, the sensational event is quickly buried in general indifference.

== Cast ==
- Alberto Sordi: Vincenzo Berruti / Dario Marsicano / Don Giuseppe / Count Momi Crosara
- Monica Vitti: Dolores
- Silvana Mangano: Vittoria Laconiglia
- Eleonora Rossi Drago: Maria Meneghello
- Liana Del Balzo: Mother of Dolores
- Guido Celano: Half brother of Vittoria
- Lars Bloch: Physicist
