= In Prison Awaiting Trial =

1971 Italian film

In Prison Awaiting Trial (Detenuto in attesa di giudizio)
- Film poster
- Directed by: Nanni Loy
- Written by: Sergio Amidei; Emilio Sanna
- Produced by: Gianni Hecht Lucari; Fausto Saraceni
- Starring: Alberto Sordi, Lino Banfi
- Cinematography: Sergio D'Offizi
- Edited by: Franco Fraticelli
- Music by: Carlo Rustichelli
- Release date: 1971
- Running time: 102 minutes
- Country: Italy
- Language: Italian

In Prison Awaiting Trial (Italian: Detenuto in attesa di giudizio) is a 1971 Italian drama film directed by Nanni Loy. It was entered into the 22nd Berlin International Film Festival where Alberto Sordi won the Silver Bear for Best Actor award.

== Plot ==
Roman surveyor Giuseppe Di Noi, who has emigrated in Sweden marrying a local woman and becoming a respected citizen, decides to take his family on holiday in Italy. At the Italian border he is stopped and arrested without explanation. After three days in jail in Milan, he learns – through the efforts of a guard – that he has been charged with "involuntary manslaughter" of a German citizen. Having ignored the arrest warrant (as he lived abroad) Giuseppe is deemed a "fugitive" and thus ineligible for house arrest; he is instead transferred from prison to prison until he reaches the imaginary town of Sagunto (near Salerno), where he gets placed in solitary confinement.

Di Noi undergoes a genuine judicial ordeal, full of humiliations. He is unwillingly involved in a riot, and as a result is transferred to a prison for inmates serving life sentences, and ultimately to a psychiatric facility. It takes the obstinacy of his wife, the passionate interest of his lawyer and the benevolence of the investigating magistrate otherwise on vacation, to arrive at a logical explanation.

While recovered at the hospital, Di Noi's lawyer learns about a highway viaduct Battipaglia-Matera, built years before by an Italian firm where he was employed, which collapsed and caused the death of a German driver in transit. The protagonist had subsequently moved to Sweden. Lacking international communications, he could not be notified a subpoena, and therefore technically became a fugitive. Even after regaining his freedom, Di Noi remains irrevocably marked by the ordeal, both physically and psychologically.

== Cast ==
- Alberto Sordi as Giuseppe Di Noi
- Elga Andersen as Ingrid
- Andrea Aureli as Police officer
- Lino Banfi as Sagunto jailhouse director
- Antonio Casagrande as Judge
- Mario Pisu as Psychiatrist
- Michele Gammino as Don Paolo
- Tano Cimarosa as Prison ward
- Fulvio Mingozzi as Prison ward
- Luca Sportelli as Prison ward
- Gianni Bonagura as Lawyer Sallustio Giordana
- Nino Formicola
- Silvio Spaccesi as Marshal
- Nazzareno Natale as Saverio Guardascione
- Giovanni Pallavicino as Brigadier Saporito
- Mario Brega as Inmate
- Giuseppe Anatrelli as Inmate Rosario Scalia
