= Nanni Loy =

Italian film, theatre and TV director

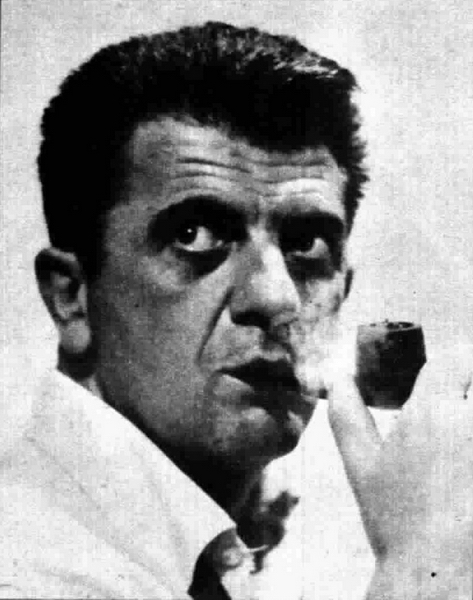
- Nanni Loy in the movie Radiocorriere magazine, 1966
- Born: Giovanni Loi; 23 October 1925; Cagliari, Sardinia, Italy
- Died: 21 August 1995 (aged 69); Fregene, Rome, Italy
- Height: 1.86 m (6 ft 1 in)

Nanni Loy (born Giovanni Loi; 23 October 1925 – 21 August 1995) was an Italian film, theatre and TV director. Specifically, Nanni Loy was Sardinian, and one of several notable Sardinian film-makers, including Franco Solinas.

== Biography ==
Loy was born in Cagliari, Sardinia: his father was Guglielmo Loy-Donà, a lawyer issue from a distinguished Sardinian-Venetian family, and his mother was the noblewoman Donna Anna Sanjust of the Marquesses of Neoneli. Rosetta Loy, an Italian novelist, is his sister-in-law.

He became famous for introducing in Italy the candid camera with his show Specchio segreto (Secret mirror) in 1965.

His 1962 film The Four Days of Naples was nominated for two Academy Awards. It also won the FIPRESCI Prize at the 3rd Moscow International Film Festival in 1963.

His 1971 film Detenuto in attesa di giudizio was entered into the 22nd Berlin International Film Festival. The star, Alberto Sordi, won the Silver Bear for Best Actor award.

He specialized in comedy films such as Padre di famiglia but he also shot films dealing with social themes (Detenuto in attesa di giudizio and Sistemo l'America e torno).

Loy died at Fregene, near Rome, in 1995.

== Partial filmography ==
- Parola di ladro (1956) (with Gianni Puccini)
- Il marito (1958) (with Gianni Puccini)
- Audace colpo dei soliti ignoti (1959)
- A Day for Lionhearts (1961)
- The Four Days of Naples (1962)
- Beautiful Families (1964)
- Made in Italy (1965)
- The Head of the Family (1967)
- Rosolino Paternò soldato (1970)
- In Prison Awaiting Trial (1971)
- Sistemo l'America e torno (1973)
- Goodnight, Ladies and Gentlemen (1976)
- Strange Occasion (1976), fragment "Italian Superman", credited as Anonymous
- Basta che non si sappia in giro (1976)
- Café Express (1980)
- Heads I Win, Tails You Lose (1982)
- Where's Picone? (1983)
- Amici miei atto III (1985)
- Street Kids (1989)
- Pacco, doppio pacco e contropaccotto (1993)
