= My Brother Anastasia =

- Directed by: Steno
- Written by: Sergio Amidei; Alberto Bevilacqua; Alberto Sordi
- Cinematography: Sergio D'Offizi
- Edited by: Raimondo Crociani
- Music by: Piero Piccioni
- Release date: 1973
- Running time: 87 minutes
- Language: Italian

My Brother Anastasia (Italian: Anastasia mio fratello) is a 1973 Italian drama crime film directed by Steno.

== Cast ==
- Alberto Sordi as Don Salvatore Anastasia
- Richard Conte as Albert Anastasia
- Luciano Pigozzi as Pasquale
- Edoardo Faieta as Sonny Boy
- Feodor Chaliapin, Jr. as Frank Costello
- Franco Angrisano as Inspector De Felice

== Plot ==
Don Salvatore Anastasia, a priest in a seminary in Tropea, Calabria (Italy), gets a ticket to visit his brother in New York. He has never known him, because the brother emigrated illegally in the U.S.A. years before.

Upon his arrival in America, he is greeted with much respect, as well as his brother, also from the Italian-American community of Little Italy. Enthusiastic of that, he decided to stay on as assistant pastor in the church of Saint Lucia and bring it to a new shine.

Accompanied in New York, his last name, Anastasia, commands respect and, above all, opens the door hitherto locked: his brother, really, is the infamous mob boss Albert Anastasia.

After the allegations of a clandestine horse race, there is a federal investigation, and Albert, brother of Don Salvatore, is locked up in the prison of Sing Sing and sentenced to 10 months for tax evasion.

Here begins the collapse of Don Salvatore, who will recover only when his brother gets out of jail. But the recovery will be short-lived because Albert dies shortly after, assassinated in a barber salon. Don Salvatore, overcome by grief at the loss of his brother, has no choice but to embark, sadly, and return to Italy.
