= The Beach (1954 film) =

- Directed by: Alberto Lattuada
- Written by: Luigi Malerba; Rodolfo Sonego; Charles Spaak; Alberto Lattuada
- Starring: Martine Carol; Raf Vallone; Mario Carotenuto
- Cinematography: Mario Craveri
- Edited by: Mario Serandrei
- Music by: Piero Piccioni
- Production companies: Titanus Film; Gamma Film
- Distributed by: Titanus Film
- Release date: 25 February 1954
- Running time: 102 minutes
- Countries: France; Italy
- Language: Italian

The Beach (Italian: La spiaggia) also internationally released as Riviera and The Boarder) is a 1954 French-Italian comedy drama film directed by Alberto Lattuada and starring Martine Carol, Raf Vallone and Mario Carotenuto. In 2008 the film was selected to enter the list of the 100 Italian films to be saved.

The film's sets were designed by the art director Dario Cecchi. It was shot at the Titanus Studios in Rome and on location around Savona in Liguria. In 2008, the film was included on the Italian Ministry of Cultural Heritage’s 100 Italian films to be saved, a list of 100 films that "have changed the collective memory of the country between 1942 and 1978."

== Plot ==
At a luxury resort on the Italian coast, a prostitute takes her young daughter for a vacation but tries to conceal her true profession from her fellow guests. She is courted by the local mayor, before her past is exposed to the gossipy society of the resort.

== Cast ==
- Martine Carol as Anna Maria Mentorsi
- Raf Vallone as Silvio, il sindaco di Pontorno
- Mario Carotenuto as Carlo Albertocchi
- Carlo Romano as Luigi
- Clelia Matania as la signora Albertocchi
- Carlo Bianco as Chiastrino, il milionario
- Nico Pepe as ex-fumatore magro
- Mara Berni as la signora Marini
- Valeria Moriconi as Gughi, l'esistenzialista
- Marcella Rovena as Luigina, moglie di Roberto
- Rosy Mazzacurati as la signora snob
- Marco Ferreri as ex-fumatore grasso
- Ennio Girolami as Riccardo

== Bibliography ==
- Bayman, Louis. Directory of World Cinema: Italy. Intellect Books, 2011.
