= 7 chili in 7 giorni =

1986 film

- Italian theatrical release poster
- Directed by: Luca Verdone
- Written by: Leonardo Benvenuti; Piero De Bernardi; Luca Verdone
- Produced by: Mario Cecchi Gori; Vittorio Cecchi Gori
- Starring: Renato Pozzetto; Carlo Verdone; Tiziana Pini
- Cinematography: Danilo Desideri
- Edited by: Antonio Siciliano
- Music by: Pino Donaggio
- Production company: C. G. Silver Film
- Distributed by: Columbia Pictures Italia
- Release dates: December 18, 1986 (Rome & Turin)
- Running time: 107 minutes
- Country: Italy
- Language: Italian
- Box office: 2.4 million admissions (Italy)

7 chili in 7 giorni (lit. '7 kilos in 7 days') is a 1986 Italian comedy film directed by Luca Verdone.

== Plot ==
Silvano and Alfio are mediocre students who manage to snatch away a degree at the university where they both studied medicine with abysmal results. After a few years Silvano (now a peddler of beauty products who on the side sells pornographic material and sex toys) meets Alfio again, now running a beauty parlor fueled with the money of his neurotic wife. After a comic mishap with a customer left too long in a sauna machine who has apparently suffered a stroke Silvano, seeing the large country villa where Alfio lives with his family, proposes him to turn it into a dieting-farm where rich customers will pay hefty sums to get rid of excess fat. The operation is run haphazardly with several incidents; in the end Alfio suffers a nervous breakdown and goes catatonic. An English professor of Aesthetics (with which Alfio shares the room in the clinic he's recuperating at) convinces the duo that true beauty lies in generous proportions, as in the works of Tiziano, Giorgione and other famous artists. Alfio and Silvano then convert the villa in a trattoria where the best patrons are the same people who originally visited it for dieting purposes.

== Cast ==
- Renato Pozzetto: Silvano Baracchi
- Carlo Verdone: Alfio Tamburini
- Silvia Annichiarico: Samantha Tamburini
- Tiziana Pini: the beautiful lady
- Franco Diogene: Assessore Turri
- Elena Fabrizi: Sora Rosa
- Annabella Schiavone: opera singer
- Fides Stagni: Samantha's grandmother
- Bruno Bilotta: younger brother of Samantha
- Aldo Massasso: older brother of Samantha
- Haruhiko Yamanouchi: the Chinese domestic
- Fiammetta Baralla: Tina, patient of the clinic

== Release and reception ==
7 chili in 7 giorni was released on December 18, 1986 in Rome and Turin.

The film had 2.4 million admissions in Italy during 1987, the tenth most popular film of the year.
