= Catherine and I =

- Directed by: Alberto Sordi
- Written by: Rodolfo Sonego, Alberto Sordi
- Produced by: Fulvio Lucisano
- Starring: Alberto Sordi, Edwige Fenech, Catherine Spaak
- Cinematography: Sergio D'Offizi
- Edited by: Tatiana Casini Morigi
- Music by: Piero Piccioni
- Release date: 1980
- Running time: 105 min
- Country: Italy
- Language: Italian

Io e Caterina (internationally released as Catherine and I) is a 1980 Italian comedy film directed by Alberto Sordi.

For his performance, Alberto Sordi was awarded with a Globo d'oro for best actor.

== Plot summary ==
Enrico has a troubled relationship with his wife, a waitress and his lover. For this reason, he decides to abandon all of them to dedicate himself to peace. In fact, he has been interested in a friend's robot waiter, and so Enrico decides to buy one for himself. The robot is called Catherine (Caterina) and serves Enrico to perfection for some time until she starts behaving strangely when Enrico brings other women to his apartment. It appears clear in the end that Caterina was in fact developing human feeling and that made the relationship with her master very complicated.

== Cast ==
- Alberto Sordi: Enrico Melotti
- Catherine Spaak: Claudia
- Edwige Fenech: Elisabetta
- Valeria Valeri: Marisa
- Rossano Brazzi: Arturo
- Susan Scheerer: Pamela
- Victoria Zinny: Susan
