= The Miser (1990 film) =

- Directed by: Tonino Cervi
- Written by: Rodolfo Sonego, Cesare Frugoni, Alberto Sordi, Tonino Cervi (from Molière's play)
- Produced by: Tonino Cervi
- Starring: Alberto Sordi; Laura Antonelli; Miguel Bosè; Christopher Lee; Carlo Croccolo
- Cinematography: Armando Nannuzzi, Enrico Appetito
- Edited by: Nino Baragli
- Music by: Piero Piccioni
- Distributed by: United International Pictures
- Release date: 1990
- Running time: 120 minutes
- Country: Italy
- Language: Italian
- Box office: $3 million

The Miser (Italian: L'avaro) is a 1990 Italian comedy film directed by Tonino Cervi. It is a loose adaptation of Molière's comedy The Miser.

== Plot ==
The rich and miserly Don Arpagone lives his days following precise patterns and commanding his servants and sons. He wants to marry a rich girl named Marianna, but is loved by the boy Valerio, without Arpagone knowing. As if that were not enough, Arpagone, in addition to wanting the inheritance of the new bride, intends to marry his daughter with a rich noble to earn more money.
Don Arpagone also has a chest full of gold coins, which he jealously guards because he fears that everybody wants to steal it, including the servants and children in his family. Just when one day Arpagone drops his guard, his young friend Valerio steals the cash coins to marry his beautiful lover ...

== Cast ==
- Alberto Sordi as Arpagone
- Laura Antonelli as Frosina
- Nicola Farron as Cleante
- Anna Kanakis as Elisa
- Valérie Allain as Marianna
- Miguel Bosé as Valerio
- Christopher Lee as Cardinale Spinosi
- Marie Laforêt as Contessa Isabella Spinosi
- Lucia Bosè as Donna Elvira
- Franco Interlenghi as Mastro Giacomo
- Carlo Croccolo as Mastro Simone
- Nunzia Fumo as Argena
- Jacques Sernas as Don Guglielmo
- Mattia Sbragia as Don Oronte
