= Anna Fougez =

Italian singer and actress (1894–1966)

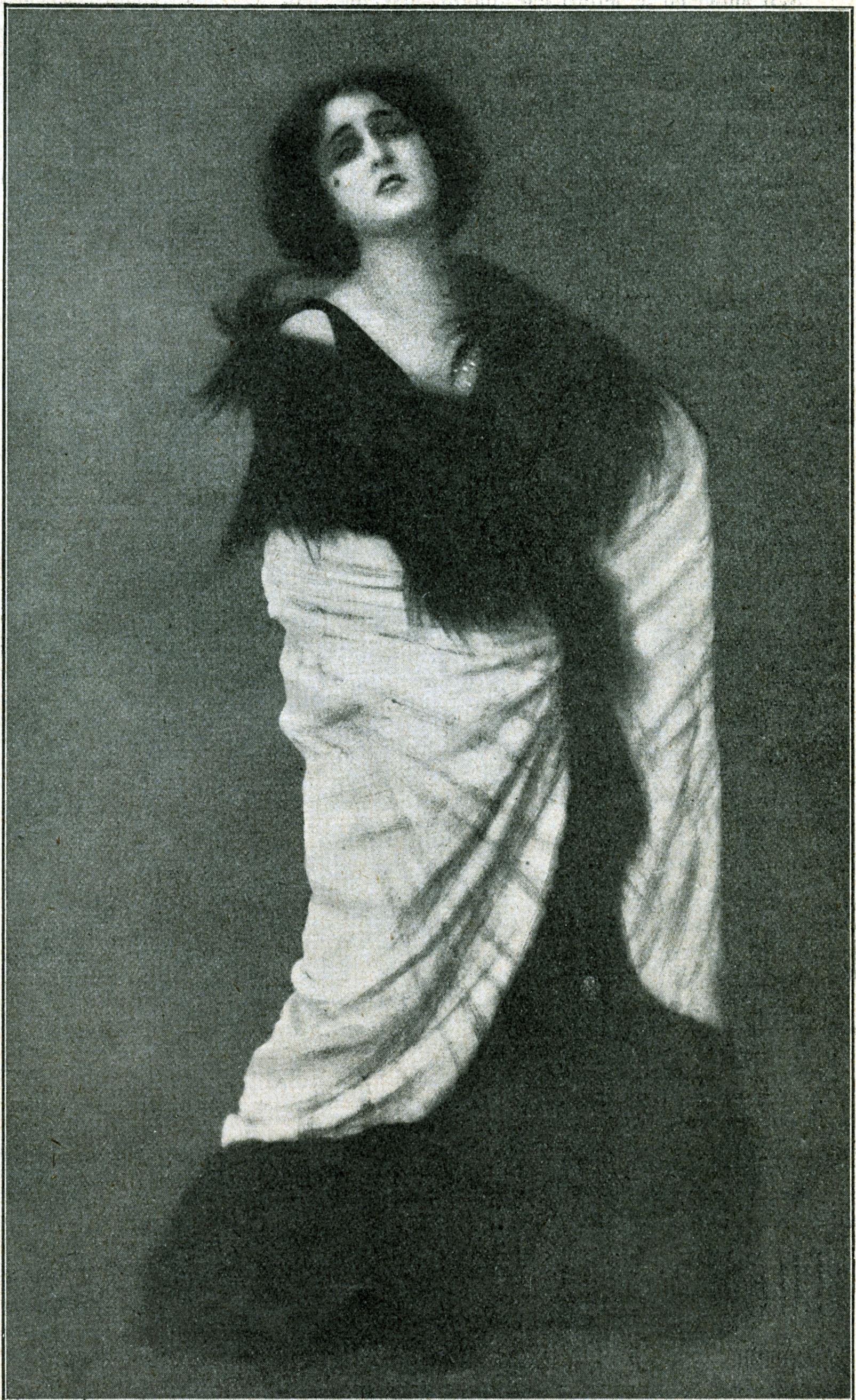
- Born: Maria Annina Laganà Pappacena; 9 July 1894; Taranto, Apulia, Kingdom of Italy
- Died: 11 September 1966 (aged 72); Santa Marinella, Rome, Italy
- Spouse: René Thano

Maria Annina Laganà Pappacena, best known as Anna Fougez (9 July 1894 – 11 September 1966), was an Italian actress and singer.

Born in Taranto, Italy, at 6 years old Pappacena became orphan of both her parents, and was adopted by her aunt. She was a child prodigy, debuting as a café-chantant singer aged eight, and at 9 years old she was already a star, performing as a canzone napoletana singer in Milan, Paris and Naples. She adopted her stage name as a tribute to French singer Eugénie Fougère.

While at that time the success of variety artists was in general short and ephemeral, Fougez was a real diva for several decades, and was the most paid Italian artist of her time. Reasons for her ensuring success include her ability in choosing her repertoire and adapting it to her figure, her peculiar beauty, more elegant and very different from the other actresses of her time, her ability to readily interact with the audience, and her particular costumes, which she mostly drew by herself, and which influenced the Italian fashion of the time. She was also in good relations with Fascism, and shortly before the March on Rome composed and performed in front of Benito Mussolini the song "Fox-trot di Mussolini".

Between the second half of the 1910s and the early 1920s Fougez starred in a number of silent films of good success. In 1928, together with her second husband, the French dancer René Thano, she started her own revue company, "Grande rivista italiana". In 1931, she wrote her memoirs, Il mondo parla ed io passo (i.e. "The world speaks and I pass"). In 1940, still famous, she eventually retired from showbusiness.
