= Piero Piccioni =

Italian film score composer

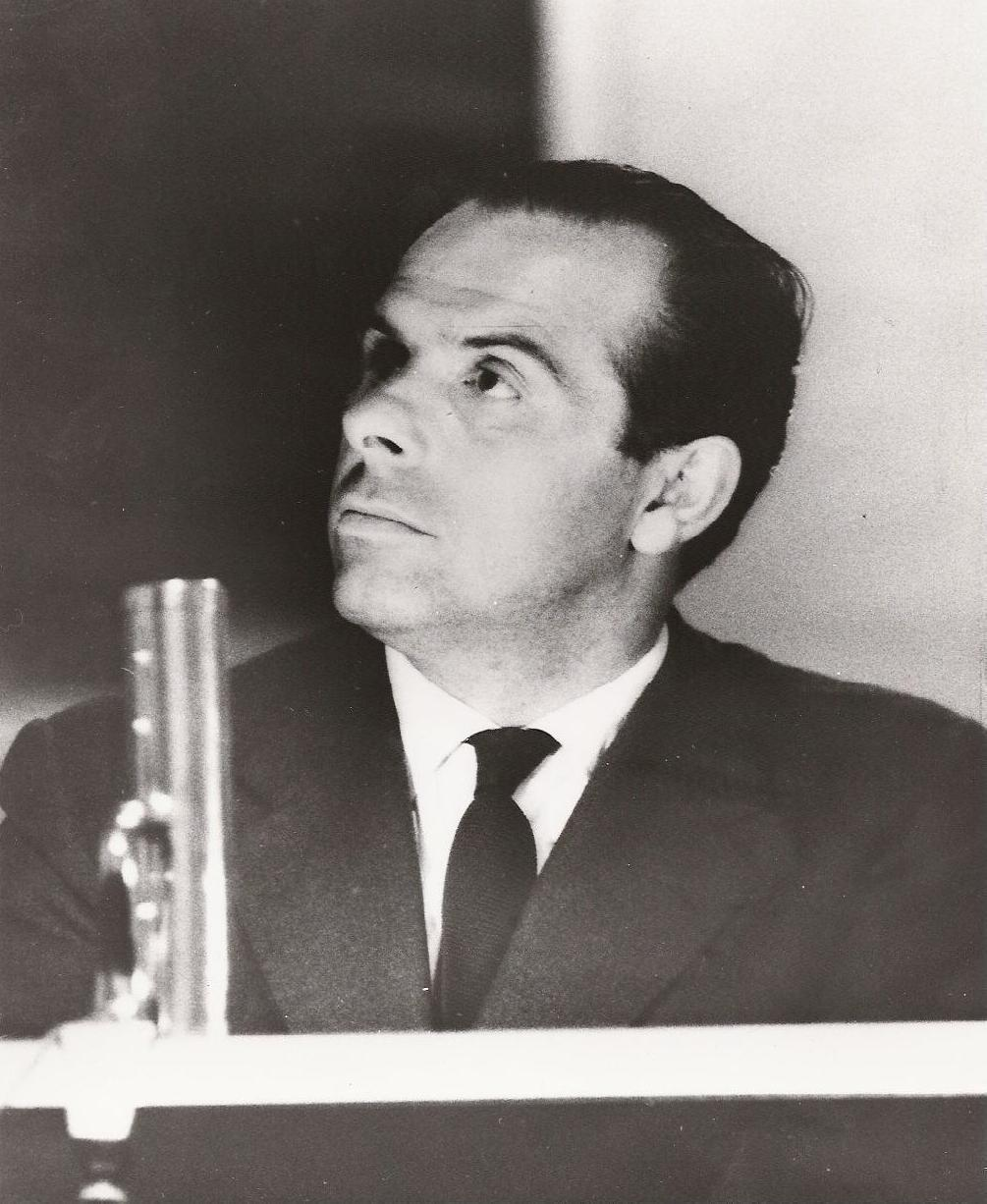
- Piccioni
- Born: Piero Piccioni; December 6, 1921; Turin, Kingdom of Italy
- Died: July 23, 2004 (aged 82); Rome, Italy
- Occupations: Pianist; organist; conductor; composer
- Years active: 1938–1998
- Style: Film scores, jazz, lounge music, bubblegum pop, teen pop Latin music, spy music, easy listening, orchestra

Piero Piccioni (Italian pronunciation: [ˈpjɛːro pitˈtʃoːni]; December 6, 1921 – July 23, 2004) was an Italian film score composer.

A pianist, organist, conductor, and composer, he was also the prolific author of more than 300 film soundtracks. He played for the first time on radio in 1938 with his "013" Big Band, to return on air only after the Allied liberation of Italy in 1944. "013" was the first Italian jazz band to be broadcast in Italy after the fall of Fascism.

His style has drawn comparisons to composers such as Ennio Morricone and Bruno Nicolai.

== Early life ==
Piero Piccioni was born in Turin, Piedmont. His mother's maiden name was Marengo, hence his pseudonym Piero Morgan, which he adopted until 1957.

When he was growing up, his father Attilio Piccioni (a prominent member of the Italian Christian Democratic Party with the post-war Italian government), would frequently take him to hear concerts at the EIAR Radio Studios in Florence. Having listened to jazz throughout his childhood (he loved the music of Art Tatum and Charlie Parker) and attending studies at the Conservatorio Luigi Cherubini, Piero Piccioni became a musician.

== Career ==
Piccioni made his radio debut at 17 with his 013 Big Band in 1938, but only returned on air after the liberation of Italy in 1944. His 013 was the first Italian jazz band to be broadcast in Italy after the fall of Fascism.

He began writing songs of his own and was soon able to get some of his works published by Carisch editions.

Piero Piccioni came into contact with the movie world in Rome during the fifties, when he was a practicing lawyer securing movie rights for Italian producers such as Titanus and De Laurentiis. During that time, Michelangelo Antonioni had called Piccioni to score a documentary film directed by Luigi Polidoro, one of his apprentices. Piccioni's first score for a feature film was Gianni Franciolini's Il mondo le condanna (1952). He consequently changed his lawyer's "toga" for a conductor's baton. He developed close-knit working relationships with directors Francesco Rosi and Alberto Sordi, and established strong personal and professional bonds with them.

Many directors sought Piero Piccioni to score the soundtracks for their films: Francesco Rosi, Mario Monicelli, Alberto Lattuada, Luigi Comencini, Luchino Visconti, Antonio Pietrangeli, Bernardo Bertolucci, Roberto Rossellini, Vittorio De Sica, Lina Wertmuller, Tinto Brass, Dino Risi, and others.

His film scores include Il bell'Antonio, Contempt, The 10th Victim, More Than a Miracle, The Deserter, The Light at the Edge of the World, Puppet on a Chain, Lucky Luciano, Camille 2000, The Nun and the Devil, Swept Away, Christ Stopped at Eboli, Fighting Back, and many Alberto Sordi movies. He is credited with over 300 soundtracks and compositions for radio, television, ballets and orchestra. Among his favorite vocalists were female soul singer Shawn Robinson and Edinburgh-born Lydia MacDonald.

== Awards and legacy ==
Piccioni won many prestigious prizes including the David di Donatello Award for the movie Swept Away (1975), Nastro d'argento Award for the movie Salvatore Giuliano by Francesco Rosi (1963), Prix International Lumière 1991, Anna Magnani Award 1975 and Vittorio De Sica Award 1979.

His song "Traffic Boom" was featured as the song for the fictional Logjammin' movie-within-a-movie in The Big Lebowski.

The song "It's Possible" from "Il Dio Sotto la Pelle" was sampled by Hollywood JB for DJ Khaled's "Jermaine's Interlude" on his Major Key album featuring J Cole, as well as on Isaiah Rashad's Headshots (4r da Locals), and Lucki's "Waiting On".

== The Montesi affair ==
In 1953 Piccioni was falsely implicated in the Montesi scandal, after a conspiracy designed to force the resignation of his father Attilio from the highest positions in the government (he was Foreign Minister at the time). On dubious information, journalists spun fabrications that he had been present, close to a villa near a beach where a girl was found drowned, allegedly after a party (which never took place).

Piccioni was acquitted in Venice in 1957 together with others after lengthy trials and tribulations, and his accusers were eventually sentenced for slander and calumny. To this day this case is known in Italy as one of the first events in post-war history where la macchina del fango or the "mud machine" was used as a means for political régime change.

== Death ==
Piccioni died in Rome on July 23, 2004 from unknown causes.

== Selected filmography ==
Year	Film	Directed by	Singles	Latest CD / Digital Release
1954	The Beach	Alberto Lattuada		
1957	The Woman Who Came from the Sea	Francesco De Robertis		Saimel / 3995610 / 2005
1957	Pretty But Poor	Dino Risi		
1957	Guendalina	Alberto Lattuada		CAM / Digital / 2022
1958	March's Child	Antonio Pietrangeli		CAM / Digital / 2024
1958	Tempest	Alberto Lattuada		Legend / CD 33 DLX / 2010
1959	Boys of the Parioli	Sergio Corbucci		CAM / Digital / 2022
1959	Vacations in Majorca	Giorgio Bianchi		CAM / Digital / 2022
1959	The Big Night	Mauro Bolognini		CAM / Digital / 2022
1960	The Employee	Gianni Puccini		CAM / Digital / 2022
1960	Il bell'Antonio	Mauro Bolognini		Dagored / RED183 / 2008
1960	World By Night	Luigi Vanzi		Camille 3000 / CAM3K-012-MDN / 2018
1960	Adua and Her Friends	Antonio Pietrangeli		Cinevox / CD MDF 359 / 2005
1960	Sweet Deceptions	Alberto Lattuada		Saimel / 3998983 / 2017
1960	From a Roman Balcony	Mauro Bolognini		CAM / Digital / 2024
1960	The Hunchback of Rome	Carlo Lizzani		
1960	The Swedes	Gian Luigi Polidoro		CAM / Digital / 2022
1961	The Assassin	Elio Petri		CAM / Digital / 2022
1961	Youth At Night	Mario Sequi		CAM / Digital / 2024
1961	La Viaccia	Mauro Bolognini		Saimel / 3998965 / 2016
1961	Destination Fury	Giorgio Bianchi		
1961	World by Night No. 2	Gianni Proia		CAM / Digital / 2022
1961	Duel of the Titans	Sergio Corbucci		
1961	The Two Marshals	Sergio Corbucci		
1962	Careless	Mauro Bolognini	CAM CA 2399: Tango Per Flicorno / Musica Del Mare	GDM / GDM 4329 / 2014
1962	Violent Life	Paolo Heusch, Brunello Rondi		CAM / CSE 106 / 1993
1962	Totò diabolicus	Steno		Digitmovies / DGST027 / 2017
1962	Eruption	Giuseppe Bennati		CAM / Digital / 2025
1962	The Slave	Sergio Corbucci		
1962	Salvatore Giuliano	Francesco Rosi		GDM / GDM 4209 / 2011
1962	The Captive City	Joseph Anthony		
1962	La commare secca	Bernardo Bertolucci		
1963	The Girl from Parma	Antonio Pietrangeli		CAM / Digital / 2023
1963	The Shortest Day	Sergio Corbucci		
1963	The Attic	Gianni Puccini		Beat Records / BCM 9519 / 2013
1963	To Bed or Not to Bed	Gian Luigi Polidoro		CAM / Digital / 2023
1963	The Demon	Brunello Rondi		Beat Records / BCM 9520 / 2013
1963	Il Boom	Vittorio De Sica	CAM CA 2505: Organ Grinders Boom / Samba Della Ruota	Think! Records / THCD-144 / 2010
1963	Hands over the City	Francesco Rosi		GDM / GDM 4209 / 2011
1963	A Sentimental Attempt	Pasquale Festa Campanile, Massimo Franciosa		
1963	The Terrorist	Gianfranco De Bosio		
1963	Contempt (Italy/Spain version)	Jean-Luc Godard		Digitmovies / CDDM002 / 2003
1964	Three for a Robbery	Gianni Bongioanni		
1964	Three Nights of Love	Renato Castellani, Luigi Comencini, Franco Rossi		CAM / CSE 112 / 1993
1964	Il disco volante	Tinto Brass		CAM / Digital / 2023
1964	Minnesota Clay	Sergio Corbucci		GDM / CD CLUB 7112 / 2012
1965	La fuga	Paolo Spinola		
1965	The Moment of Truth	Francesco Rosi		
1965	The Three Faces	Michelangelo Antonioni, Mauro Bolognini, Franco Indovina		CAM / Digital / 2024
1965	The Captain's Daughter	Leonardo Cortese		Kronos Records / KRONCD006 / 2011
1965	Agent 077: From the Orient with Fury	Sergio Grieco		
1965	I Knew Her Well	Antonio Pietrangeli		Beat Records / BCM 9521 / 2013
1965	The 10th Victim	Elio Petri		Easy Tempo / 1998
1966	Fumo di Londra	Alberto Sordi		CF Soundtracks / CFS002 / 2019
1966	Pardon, Are You For or Against?	Alberto Sordi		Digitmovies / CDDM287 / 2017
1967	The Witches	Luchino Visconti, Mauro Bolognini, Pier Paolo Pasolini, Franco Rossi, Vittorio De Sica		Digitmovies / CDDM296 / 2018
1967	I Married You for Fun	Luciano Salce		Verita Note / VQCD-10194 / 2010
1967	The Stranger	Luchino Visconti		Verita Note / VQCD-10063 / 2008
1967	More Than a Miracle	Francesco Rosi		Film Score Monthly / FSM Vol. 14 No. 7 / 2011
1967	An Italian in America	Alberto Sordi		
1968	The Young Tigers	Antonio Leonviola		Beat Records / ?????? / 2010
1968	Ballad of a Bounty Hunter	Joaquín Luis Romero Marchent		
1968	OSS 117 - Double Agent	Jean-Pierre Desagnat, Renzo Cerrato, André Hunebelle		
1968	If You Meet Sartana Pray for Your Death	Gianfranco Parolini		Verita Note / VQCD-10056 / 2007
1968	Bora Bora	Ugo Liberatore		Cinevox / CD OST-PK 022 / 2016
1968	L'Italia vista dal cielo: Emila Romagna e Marche	Folco Quilici		
1968	Be Sick... It's Free	Luigi Zampa		Beat Records / BCM 9567 / 2015
1969	Temptation	Lamberto Benvenuti		Kronos Records / KRONCD006 / 2011
1969	Naked England	Vittorio De Sisti		Quartet records / QR486 / 2022
1969	Kenner	Steve Sekely		Film Score Monthly / FSM Vol. 14 No. 7 / 2011
1969	Camille 2000	Radley Metzger		Beat Records / BCM 9576 / 2016
1969	Youth March	Franco Rossi		Easy Tempo / ET 905 CD /1998
1969	Help Me, My Love	Alberto Sordi		Beat Records / BCM9606 / 2022
1969	Oh, Grandmother's Dead	Mario Monicelli		CAM / Digital / 2022
1969	Love Me, Love My Wife	Enzo Battaglia		CAM / Digital / 2022
1969	Check to the Queen	Pasquale Festa Campanile		Cinevox / CDOST-PK 040 / 2020
1969	Playgirl '70	Federico Chentrens		Verita Note / VQCD-10178 / 2010
1969	The Others	Alessandro Fallay		Beat Records / BCM 9523 / 2013
1969	Il Prof. Dott. Guido Tersilli, primario della clinica Villa Celeste, convenzionata con le mutue	Luciano Salce		GDM / GDM 2042 / 2004
1970	Let's Have a Riot	Luigi Zampa		Avanz Records / SP/CR-20015 / 1997
1970	The Syndicate: A Death in the Family	Piero Zuffi		Quartet Records / QR472 / 2021
1970	Stop the world... I want to get off!	Giancarlo Cobelli		Beat Records / BCM 9574 / 2016
1970	The President of Borgorosso Football Club	Luigi Filippo D'Amico		
1970	So Long Gulliver	Carlo Tuzii		Saimel / 3996810 / 2005
1970	The Deserter	Burt Kennedy		Legend / CD32DLX / 2010
1970	Man and Wife	Mario Monicelli, Alberto Sordi, Vittorio De Sica		
1970	Many Wars Ago	Francesco Rosi		
1971	Marta	José Antonio Nieves Conde		Chris' Soundtrack Corner / CSC 041 / 2023
1971	In the Eye of the Hurricane	José María Forqué		CAM / Digital / 2024
1971	Devil's Ransom	Piero Sciumè		Saimel / 3996810 / 2005
1971	The Light at the Edge of the World	Kevin Billington		Quartet Records / QR176 / 2014
1971	Puppet on a Chain	Geoffrey Reeve		Silva Screen / SILCD1519 / 2017
1971	In the Name of the Father, of the Son and of the Colt	Mario Bianchi		
1971	A Girl in Australia	Luigi Zampa		GDM / CD CLUB 7024 / 2004
1971	Seven Murders for Scotland Yard	José Luis Madrid		Beat Records / CDCR 29 / 1996
1972	The Seduction of Mimi	Lina Wertmüller		Cinevox / CD MDF 628 / 2008
1972	The Mattei Affair	Francesco Rosi		GDM / GDM 4209 / 2011
1972	Watch Out Gringo! Sabata Will Return	Alfonso Balcázar, Pedro L. Ramirez		
1972	The Scientific Cardplayer	Luigi Comencini		Quartet Records / QR529 / 2023
1972	The Monk	Ado Kyrou		Digitmovies / CDDM191 / 2011
1973	A Colt In The Hand Of The Devil	Gianfranco Baldanello		
1973	The Nun and the Devil	Domenico Paolella		Digitmovies / CDDM015 / 2004
1973	The Lonely Woman	Francisco Rovira Beleta		Saimel / 3995510 / 2004
1973	My Brother Anastasia	Steno		Beat Records / BCM9597 / 2022
1973	Lucky Luciano	Francesco Rosi	Epic ECPB-274: Underground Sketches	
1973	A Way Of Being A Woman	Pier Ludovico Pavoni		Saimel / 3995510 / 2004
1973	Story of a Cloistered Nun	Fernando Cerchio		Digitmovies / CDDM015 / 2004
1973	Polvere di stelle	Alberto Sordi		
1974	God Under the Skin	Carlo Alberto Pinelli, Folco Quilici		Quartet Records / QR471 / 2021
1974	All Screwed Up	Lina Wertmüller	Traffic Boom	Beat Records / CDCR 113 / 2011
1974	Appassionata	Gianluigi Calderone	Cinevox MDF 051: Strano Mercoledi' 2 / La Chatte	Quartet Records / QRSCE028 / 2011
1974	Kidnap	Giovanni Fago		Digitmovies / CDDM170 / 2010
1974	The Kiss	Mario Lanfranchi		Beat Records / CDCR 30 / 1995
1974	Swept Away	Lina Wertmüller		Beat Records / DDJ016 / 2012
1974	While There's War There's Hope	Alberto Sordi		
1975	Dawn of Man	Folco Quilici		Beat Records / BCM 9539 / 2014
1975	Brother Sea	Folco Quilici		Beat Records / BCM 9545 / 2018
1975	City and Countryside	Vittorio Marchetti		
1976	Dog's Heart	Alberto Lattuada		Beat Records / BCM9616 / 2024
1976	Illustrious Corpses	Francesco Rosi		GDM / CD CLUB 7013 / 2002
1976	Chi dice donna dice donna	Tonino Cervi		CAM / Digital / 2023
1976	A Common Sense of Modesty	Alberto Sordi		
1977	This Is the Night	Carlo Di Carlo		CAM / Digital / 2022
1978	Professor Kranz tedesco di Germania	Luciano Salce		Beat Records / DDJ010 / 2011
1978	The Witness	Jean-Pierre Mocky		Music Box Records / MBR-052 / 2014
1978	Where Are You Going on Holiday?	Mauro Bolognini, Luciano Salce, Alberto Sordi		GDM / CD CLUB 7079 / 2010
1979	Fear Over the World	Domenico Campana		CAM / Digital Only / 2024
1979	Christ Stopped at Eboli	Francesco Rosi	CAM AMP 221: Cristo Si E' Fermato A Eboli (3:06) / Cristo Si E' Fermato A Eboli (2:33)	
1979	Upcoming… Marsch!	Luciano Salce		CAM / Digital Only / 2022
1980	The Precarious Bank Teller	Luciano Salce		
1980	Catherine and I	Luciano Salce		CAM / Digital Only / 2022
1981	Three Brothers	Francesco Rosi		Quartet Records / QR528 / 2023
1982	Fighting Back	Lewis Teague		Quartet Records / QR230 / 2016
1982	I Know That You Know That I Know	Alberto Sordi		GDM / CD CLUB 7075 / 2009
1982	Journey with Papa	Alberto Sordi		
1984	Everybody in Jail	Alberto Sordi		
1985	I Am an ESP	Sergio Corbucci		Digitmovies / CDDM288 / 2018
1985	Quo Vadis?	Franco Rossi		
1987	Chronicle of a Death Foretold	Francesco Rosi		Virgin / CDV 2441 / 1987
1987	A Taxi Driver in New York	Alberto Sordi		Digitmovies / CDDM278 / 2016
1990	The Miser	Tonino Cervi		
1992	Acquitted for Having Committed the Deed	Alberto Sordi		
1998	Forbidden Encounters	Alberto Sordi		RCA / 74321-64058-2 / 1998
