= Milena Milani =

Italian writer, journalist, and artist (1917–2013)

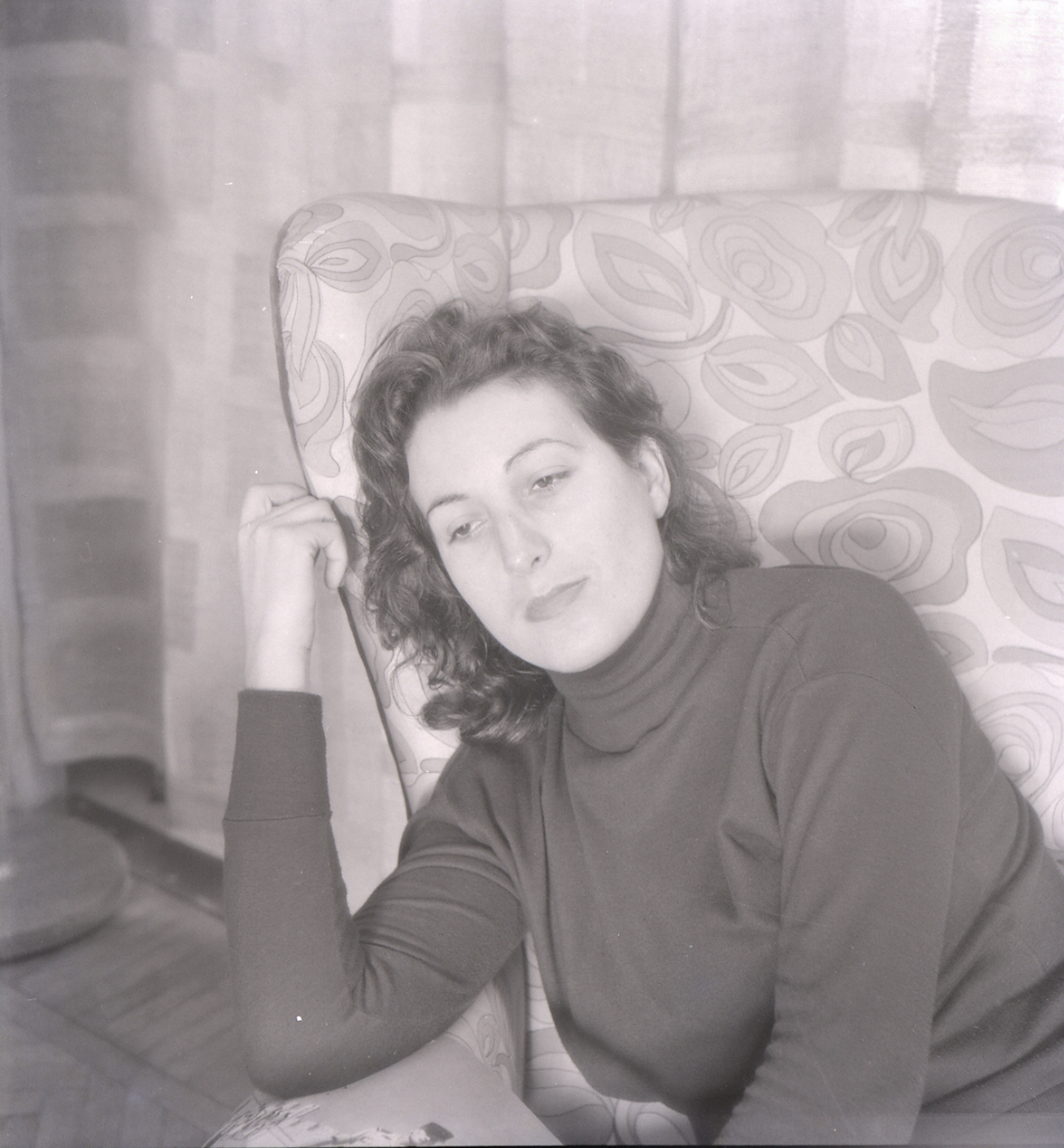
- Milena Milani photographed in 1963 by Paolo Monti
- Born: 1917
- Died: 2013 (aged 95–96)
- Occupations: writer; artist

Milena Milani (1917–2013) was an Italian writer, journalist, and artist.

== Early life ==
Milani was born in Savona in 1917. She grew up in a house located in front of the railway station on Letimbro. Her father, Tullio Milani, was an agronomist from Livorno. Her mother, Anna Antonione, was from Dogliani in Piedmont. Milani's parent were fervent admirer of the October Revolution. She often claimed that she was given the name Milena because it was the closest thing to Lenin – the name she would have received had she been a male. Milani studied at the Istituto magistrale in Savona. In 1941 she started contributing to the journal Littoriali della cultura e dell'arte e del lavoro in Sanremo. Later that year, she moved to Rome to attend the La Sapienza University.

== Career ==
In Rome, Milani joined the fascist youth newspaper Roma fascista (Fascist Rome), where she wrote on a variety of subjects, including art, poetry and the life of German female university students. In 1942 she met with Filippo Tommaso Marinetti, who appointed her as "General Commander of All Futurist Women of Italy". Milani's views on Benito Mussolini and fascism changed when she began to hang out with a group of students and intellectuals who used to meet in the Caffè Aragno. Some of them, rallied by Giuseppe Ungaretti and Corrado Alvaro, had participated in the occupation of a fascist daily newspaper in via del Tritone a few months before. In 1943, following the outbreak of Italian Civil War, she was forced to leave Rome by the Schutzstaffel.

Milani relocated to Venice where she met with the collector and art dealer Carlo Cardazzo. Milani and Cardazzo started a romantic relationship despite Cardazzo's family objections. After the end of the war, Milani briefly worked as a sports journalist. In 1946 she covered the Giro d'Italia for the magazine Il Campione. In 1963 Milani and Cardazzo broke up their relationship and she returned to her native Liguria.

== "Girl called Jules" and Obscenity Trial ==
In 1964 Milani published her first novel, La ragazza di nome Giulio (Girl called Jules) with Longanesi. The book stirred a lot of controversy for its dealing with queer and feminist themes in a candid way. Milani and Mario Monti, Longanesi's editorial director, were the subject of an obscenity trial and sentenced to six months imprisonment on 22 March 1966. Many Italian cultural figures, including Giuseppe Ungaretti, expressed their support for Milani.She was eventually acquitted in 1967, with the rationale that "erotic ideas fit harmoniously into the narrative fabric and respond to the descriptive requirements that the theme of condemned woman to solitude suggested and which were happily realized in the poetic unity of the work". Girl called Jules was translated into many languages and became an international bestseller, especially in France, the United States and England,

In the 1970s Milani lived in Albissola Marina, in a well-known building called "Casa di vetro", where she wrote her second novel, La storia di Anna Drei (The story of Anna Drei). In 1983 she published her third novel, Io donna e gli altri (I Woman, and the others). The book chronicles the quest of a woman for her lover to come back. She searched him through different cities but eventually has to accept that he is gone. In the mid-1970s Milani campaigned against the demolition of the Letimbro railway station and wrote a piece about her childhood memories of the place, like the wood-burning stove of the waiting room and the large mirror where she would see the reflection of her face as a little girl.

== Art ==
In addition to literature, Milani was also interested in painting and ceramics. From 1946 to 1963, she regularly exhibited in group shows at her then-lover Carlo Cardazzo's gallery, Il Naviglio in Milan. Milani befriended Lucio Fontana, and participated, both through her paintings and writings, to exhibitions of the Spatialism movement.

Milani's first solo exhibition took place in 1965 at the Argentario Gallery in Trento. Later in the same year, she had another show at the Circolo degli Artisti in Albissola Mare. Other exhibitions of her work were staged at Galleria Regis in Finale Ligure (1969); Galleria Il Punto, Turin (1969); Galleria del Centro di Vercelli (1970); Chez Venier in Cortina d'Ampezzo (1970); Galleria Il Traghetto 2, Venice (1970); Galleria Fontana di Savona (1970); Galleria Il Salotto in Genoa (1971); Galleria Zanini in Rome (1971); Farsetti Art Gallery in Cortina d'Ampezzo (1972); Bon à tirer gallery in Milan (1972); Christian Stein Gallery in Turin (1972); Cavour Art Gallery in Milan (1972); Galleria dei Carbini in Varazze (1972); Galleria de Il Giorno in Milan (1972); Studio d'Arte Moderna SM 13 in Rome (1972); and Galleria Il Salotto di Como (1973). In 1998, a work by Milani, the Memory Tree, was installed in Via dell'Oratorio in Albissola Marina. The piece consisted in a group of wooden leaves, each reading the name of a deceased artist.

== Personal life ==
Milani was romantically involved with Carlo Cardazzo and writer Alberto Moravia, but never married. She spent the final years of her life at the Hotel Garden in Albissola Marina. She died in 2013 at the San Paolo Hospital, the same one where she was born 94 years before.

== Books ==
- A girl called Jules. Translator Graham Snell. London: Hutchinson 1966, OCLC 25452106
- The story of Anna Drei translator Graham Snell, London: Arrow Books, 1970. ISBN 9780090036103, OCLC 877208027
