= Alberto Sordi =

Italian actor (1920–2003)

Alberto Sordi OMRI
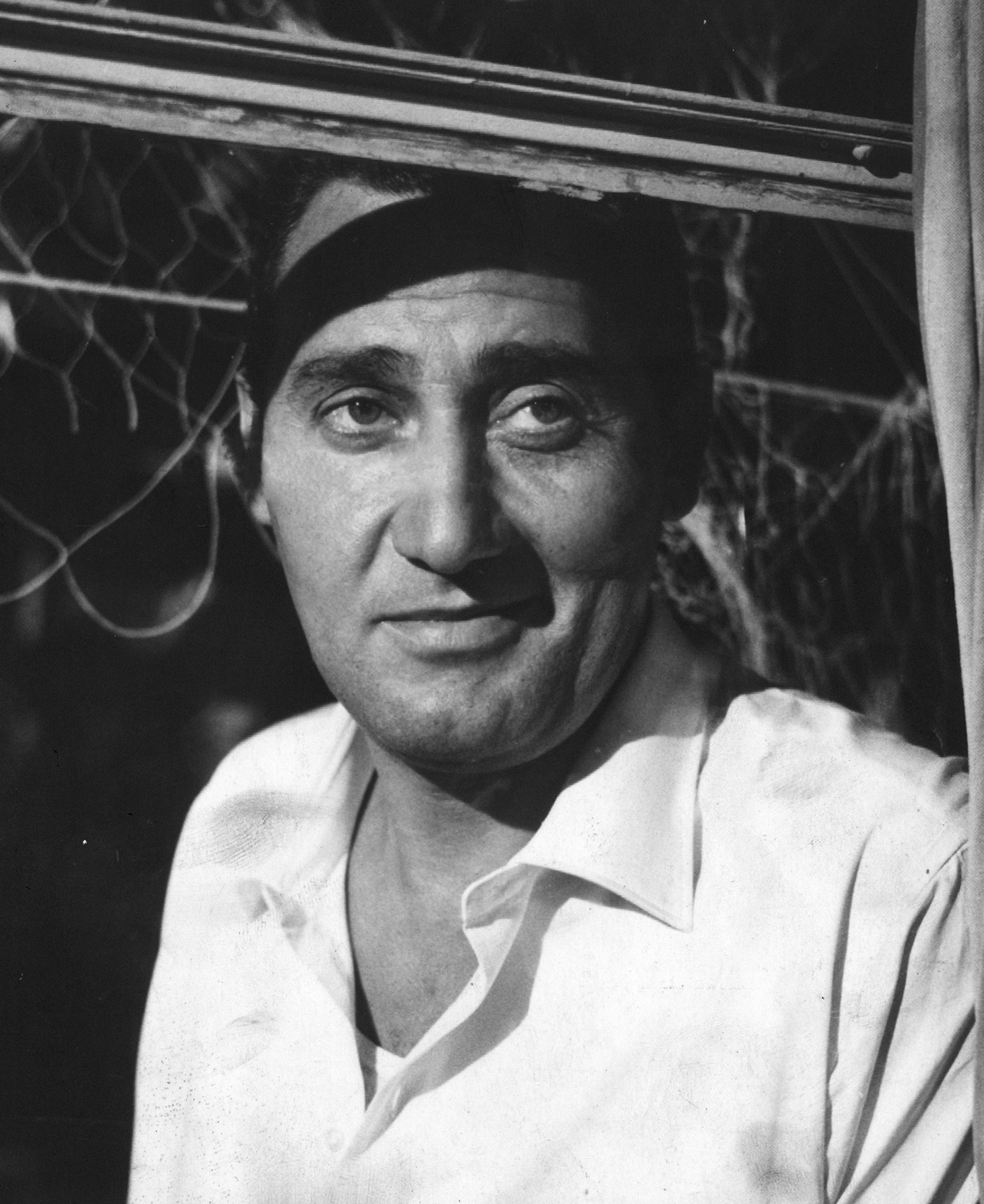
- Sordi in 1962
- Born: 15 June 1920; Rome, Italy
- Died: 24 February 2003 (aged 82); Rome, Italy
- Other name: Albertone
- Occupations: Actor; dubber; comedian; director; singer; composer; screenwriter
- Years active: 1937–1998
- Height: 1.75 m (5 ft 9 in)
- Website: albertosordi.it

Alberto Sordi (15 June 1920 – 24 February 2003) was an Italian actor, comedian, voice dubber, director, singer, composer and screenwriter.

Sordi is considered one of the most important actors in the history of Italian cinema and one of the best in commedia all'italiana. Together with Nino Manfredi, Vittorio Gassman and Ugo Tognazzi he formed a quartet that starred in the most popular movies of this genre. His trio with Aldo Fabrizi and Anna Magnani was one of the most prominent in the Roman cinema.

Sordi established himself as an icon from a career that spanned seven decades of Italian cinema with his skills in comedy and light drama. He started as a voice actor (most notably dubbing Oliver Hardy) and a theater actor, but eventually grew to fame as a comedian. In the 1960s, he started interpreting complex dramatic characters, as well as directing his own films: his credits as a director include 19 movies. Sordi won five Nastro d'argento, ten David di Donatello, a Golden Globe, a Golden Lion for Lifetime Achievement, and many other awards and accolades.

== Early years and education ==
Alberto Sordi was born in Rome, in via San Cosimato, 7, on the 15th of June, 1920. His father Pietro Sordi (1879–1941) was a music professor, he played tuba contrabbasso in the orchestra of the Teatro dell'Opera di Roma. His mother Maria Righetti (1889–1952) was an elementary school teacher. Alberto Sordi was the fifth of their children, his elder siblings were Savina (1911–1972), Giuseppe (1915–1990), and Aurelia (1917–2014). He received his name after Alberto, the couple's third son, who died in 1916 being only several days old. The Sordi family was coming from Valmontone where Alberto spent a part of his childhood.

Already in elementary school Alberto started staging small puppet plays. At the age of 7, he developed interest in opera. He sang in the Sistine Chapel Choir headed by Lorenzo Perosi. When Sordi's voice changed to bass, he studied opera and performed as an opera singer for several years. However, the parents did not support his pursuit of an acting career. Only the maternal grandfather Primo Righetti encouraged Alberto Sordi to try himself as a performer and even presented him with a tuxedo with some money inside the pocket. For several years, he wore that costume on stage.

In 1936, he recorded a disc of children's fairy tales for the Fonit record company and left for Milan with the proceeds There Sordi enrolled to Accademia dei Filodrammatici, for which he abandoned his studies at the Istituto di Avviamento Commerciale "Giulio Romano" in Rome. However, to please his mother, he graduated as an accountant several years later. From Accademia dei Filodrammatici he was expelled for the thick Romanesco dialect. In light theatre, after an unsuccessful attempt with the company of Aldo Fabrizi and Anna Fougez in the 1936–1937 season in the show San Giovanni, he tried again in the following season. He formed a comic duo with his childhood friend, they debuted at Cinema Teatro Pace in Milan but had little success and had to go back to Rome.

== Career ==
=== Voice actor ===
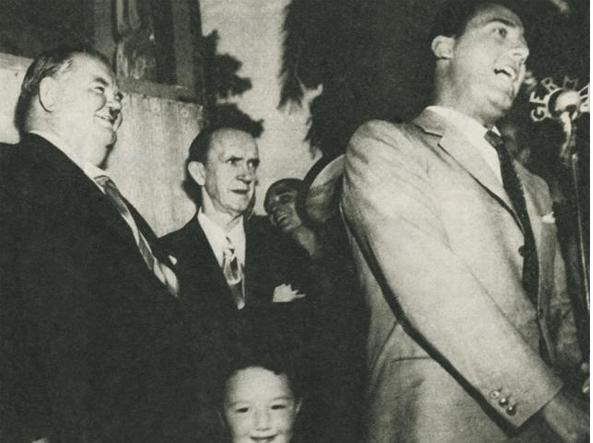
Sordi (right) with Stan Laurel (center) and Oliver Hardy (left) in Villa Aldobrandini, Rome, 25 June 1950

In 1937, he returned to Rome and found himself several roles as a background actor at Cinecittà. In the same year, he won a competition organised by Metro-Goldwyn-Mayer to dub the voice of Oliver Hardy (initially under the pseudonym Albert Odisor), along with Mauro Zambuto, who dubbed Stan Laurel. As recalled by Sordi himself, he went into the auditions with no specific dubbing experience and with little expectation of success, given the competition from established professionals in the industry. It was MGM dubbing director Franco Schirato who considered Sordi's low register and 'warm and mellow' voice an ideal match for the character's considerable size (although Hardy's voice was actually in the tenor register); he was therefore cast without delay, debuting in the dubbing of the comedy Below Zero in 1939, followed by the feature film The Flying Deuces in the same year.

As a voice actor, Sordi worked until 1956. In addition to numerous other Laurel and Hardy films, he gave the voice to, among others, Bruce Bennett, Anthony Quinn, John Ireland, Robert Mitchum, Pedro Armendáriz and, for the Italians, Franco Fabrizi and even Marcello Mastroianni, in the 1950 film Sunday in August. His own voice was dubbed over by Gualtiero De Angelis in Cuori nella tormenta and Carlo Romano in Bullet for Stefano. After 1952, he no longer worked as a voice actor, giving all his energy to acting.

=== Theater and cinema actor ===
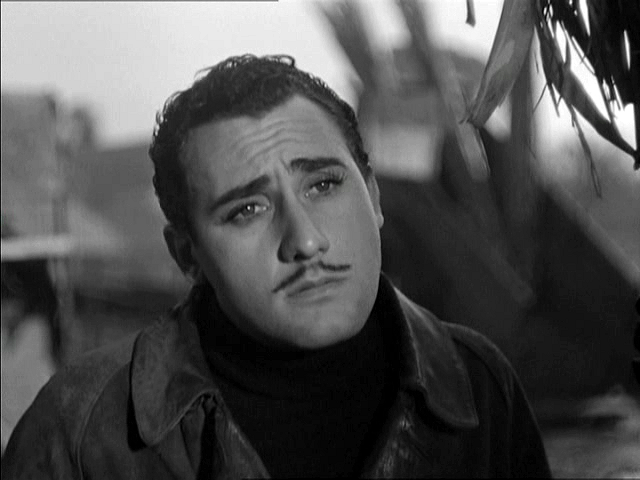
Sordi in Under the Sun of Rome (1948)

Sordi finally managed to make his debut in the revue theatre in the company of Guido Riccioli and Nanda Primavera in the 1938–1939 season with the show Ma in campagna è un'altra... rosa. In this show he initially had the role of stilé (line dancer), but was later promoted to the role of butler in a sketch by Benini and Gori written especially for him. In 1938–39, he played in several movies, including Princess Tarakanova and The Night of Tricks.

In 1940, he was called to arms. He was assigned to the 82nd Infantry Regiment "Torino" and served in the regimental orchestra, who played accompanying the soldiers' departures for the brief French campaign. During the service, Sordi still had time to pursue his artistic career. In this period, he played minor roles in Giararub directed by Goffredo Alessandrini, La Signorina by Ladislao Kish, Le signorine della villa accanto by Gian Paolo Rosmino. The first major success came with Mario Mattoli's The Three Pilots. On stage he was getting known as a comedian and joined the Compagnia di riviste di Fanfulla. In 1943, he played a part in Mattoli's Ritorna Za-Bum at Teatro Quirino.

In 1950, with Vittorio De Sica he co-founded the P.F.C. (Produzione Film Comici), but disengaged from it in 1951. Also in 1950, he debuted as a protagonist in Mamma Mia, What an Impression!. However, the film received tepid reviews from critics and the audience. In 1951 he first started collaborating with Federico Fellini: they made The White Sheik in 1952 and I vitelloni in 1953, a movie about young slackers, in which he plays a weak immature loafer. For I vitelloni Sordi was praised by critics and for the first time appreciated highly as a dramatic actor and honoured with Nastro d'Argento for Best Supporting Actor In 1954 he played in as many as in 13 films, including An American in Rome, Il seduttore, etc. Late in 1953, Sordi went to New York with Goffredo Lombardo who intended to shoot there Un romano a New York. Though the project was never realized, the trip made Sordi think about perspectives in foreign cinema.

For his performance in The Bachelor directed by Antonio Pietrangeli, Sordi was awarded with Nastro d'Argento for Best Actor. In 1955, during a trip to Kansas city, he was greatly welcomed as the city was a homeland of his character Nando Mericoni. Sordi was presented with the symbolic key to the city and the title of honorary citizen.

As the genre of Italian comedy progressed and took shape, Sordi's signature character crystallized into something that critics referred to as so-called 'average Italian'. These characters tend to be overbearing with the weak and servile with the powerful, from whom they try to get privileges. Promotion of such characters was criticized and by some called 'giving a bad example' because their representation somehow justified such behavior and gave some the example as an excuse for their meagreness. Some important characters he did were Ubaldo Impallato in Bravissimo, Peppino in Fortunella, Bepi in Venice, the Moon and You, Alberto Nardi in Il vedovo.

In 1959, Sordi appeared in Monicelli's Great War, considered by many critics and film historians to be one of the best Italian comedies. For the role in this film, he was awarded with his second Nastro d'Argento for Best Actor and the first David di Donatello. The Great War marks a turning point in his career, when Sordi moved on from playing meager 'average Italians' to interpreting complex dramatic characters. The 1960 film Everybody Go Home directed by Luigi Comencini also was a great success, it was referred to as one of the most important cinema in post-war Italy. Sordi won his second David di Donatello for it, as well as the Grolla d'oro.

Sordi acted alongside Britain's David Niven in the World War II comedy The Best of Enemies. In 1963, he was awarded a Golden Globe for Best Motion Picture Actor in a Musical or Comedy for Il diavolo. The movie also won the Golden Bear at Berlin International Film Festival. In 1965, he was in another highly regarded comedy, I complessi (Complexes).

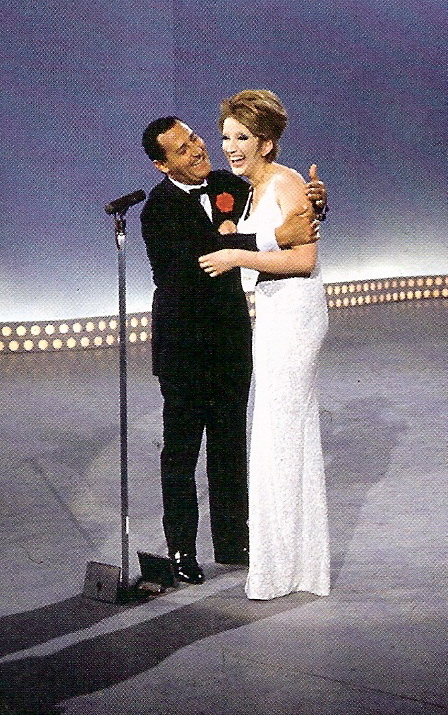
Sordi with Mina on the TV show Studio Uno (1966)

In 1969, he was a juror at the 6th Moscow International Film Festival. In 1984, he directed and co-scripted Tutti dentro (Off to jail, everybody), in which he played a judge who has warrants for corruption served on ministers and businessmen. In 1985, he was a member of the jury at the 35th Berlin International Film Festival. Sordi appeared in more than 150 films in his film career.

=== Film director ===
His credits as a director include 19 films.

In 1966, Sordi made his directorial debut with the comedy Fumo di Londra, acting as both writer and performer in the lead role. The performance brought him another David di Donatello. In 1967, together with Vittorio De Sica, he went to the USA where they co-created An Italian in America. From that moment Sordi decided to concentrate on creating his own films, where he would be both director and screenwriter. In 1969, he released Help Me, My Love starring Monica Vitti. He made two more movies with Vitti in the main lead: Polvere di stelle (1973) and I Know That You Know That I Know (1982).

In 1980, he released Catherine and I, a comedy–science fiction film that he also directed and co-wrote with Rodolfo Sonego, starring Sordi alongside Edwige Fenech and Catherine Spaak; the film follows a middle-aged businessman who, frustrated with his wife, lover and domestic life, replaces them with a humanoid robot maid whose increasingly human emotions—especially jealousy—complicate his attempt to live without relationships.

Two years later, he directed Journey with Papa where he starred alongside Carlo Verdone. The duo of two actors from different generations was very well received by audiences and the film's box office were record high. Released during the Christmas holidays, the film started Sordi's tradition of making a film every year before Christmas. In December 1983, he released Il tassinaro.

In 1984, he directed and co-scripted Tutti dentro (Off to jail, everybody), in which he played a judge who has warrants for corruption served on ministers and businessmen. In 1985, Sordi was a member of the jury at the 35th Berlin International Film Festival.

=== Later years ===
His later films were Troppo forte (1986), A Taxi Driver in New York (1987), Nestore, l'ultima corsa (1994). The last film by Sordi was directed in 1998. Titled Incontri proibiti, it starred Franca Faldini who returned on screen after 40 years of absence.

In 2001, Sordi was diagnosed with lung cancer. He died of pneumonia and bronchitis at his villa in Rome on the night between 24 and 25 February 2003. A crowd in excess of a million gathered to pay their last respects at his funeral by the Basilica of St. John Lateran.

== Personal life ==
Sordi was very discreet about his private life and never spoke to journalists about it. Despite never marrying and having no children, Sordi was in several relationships, including a nine-year romance with actress Andreina Pagnani. Only after his death some relatives revealed stories and anecdotes from his private life. The niece of Alberto Sordi recalled that he remained forever grateful to grandfather Primo Righetti for his constant support at the early stages of career. They remained close, when Primo Reghetti experienced health problems in the late years, Sordi paid for his treatment in the best private clinics. The peers recalled that Sordi avoided the VIP social gatherings and parties, especially in the 1960s, the time of 'Dolce Vita', while most of his colleagues enjoyed nightlife, he was always busy working and releasing 13–15 movies a year. He was enormously famous in Italy, and was nicknamed ' l'Albertone ': lit., 'The Great Alberto'.

Except for the brief period in his youth, when he tried to study in Milan, Sordi always lived in Rome. In 1958, he purchased and moved to a luxurious villa in via Druso, 45, next to the Baths of Caracalla. For more than 40 years, he lived there with his sister Aurelia.

Sordi was raised Roman Catholic. He was also a big supporter of the AS Roma football team. This was something he expressed a fondness of in some of his films.

== Awards and honors ==
In his prolific career, Sordi received dozens of most prestigious and important awards and accolades. He won ten David di Donatello, Italy's most prestigious film award, holding the record of David di Donatello as best actor, and four awards for his works from the Italian National Syndicate of Film Journalists. At the 22nd Berlin International Film Festival, he won the Silver Bear for Best Actor award for Detenuto in attesa di giudizio. At the 13th Moscow International Film Festival he won a Special Prize for I Know That You Know That I Know. He also received a Golden Lion for lifetime achievement at the Venice Film Festival in 1995, and The Golden Globe Award for his performance as an Italian labourer stranded in Sweden in To Bed or Not to Bed. In 2000, the City of Rome made him honorary mayor for a day to celebrate his eightieth birthday.

== Charity and legacy ==
Sordi deliberately built a reputation as a greedy man. He carefully maintained the myth, but as claimed and witnessed by relatives and friends, donated money to numerous charity projects and supported his family, friends, and colleagues, by paying for their healthcare and other needs. Even the costumes made for his films he gave away for the poor.

In 1992, Sordi established Fondazione Alberto Sordi, a nonprofit institution aimed to help and support the elderly people. He also bought for the Foundation a land plot where in 2002 were opened two Healthcare and Rehabilitation centres for the senior Italians.

In 2017, his family established the Alberto Sordi Family Award that honour Italian and international filmmakers and actors.

== Will and heritage ==
Alberto Sordi left all his fortune to his sister Aurelia. Aurelia, who died in 2014 at 97, bequeathed the entire fortune to three foundations named after her brother, but only two of them were really supported by Sordi: Fondazione Alberto Sordi, established in 1992, and Fondazione Alberto Sordi per i giovani, founded in 2001. As suspected by the relatives, Aurelia was tricked into creating the third foundation by her closest personnel, a driver, a housekeeper, and lawyers. The third foundation, titled Fondazione Museo Alberto Sordi, was registered in 2011, when Aurelia had already displayed symptoms of dementia. According to Aurelia's will, also written in 2011, Fondazione Museo Alberto Sordi inherited the fortune of more than 30 mln euro and a Roman villa in via Druso, 45, where she and her brother had been living since 1958. Fondazione Alberto Sordi and Fondazione Alberto Sordi per i giovani both received around 10 mln euro. 37 family members of Sordi sued the Fondazione Museo Alberto Sordi and 9 members of the personal staff of Aurelia, trying to invalidate the will. The case was started following a complaint filed by a bank that had noticed suspicious movements on Aurelia's bank accounts. However, after a five year trial, the court acknowledged the will and acquitted the defendants of all charges.

== Filmography ==
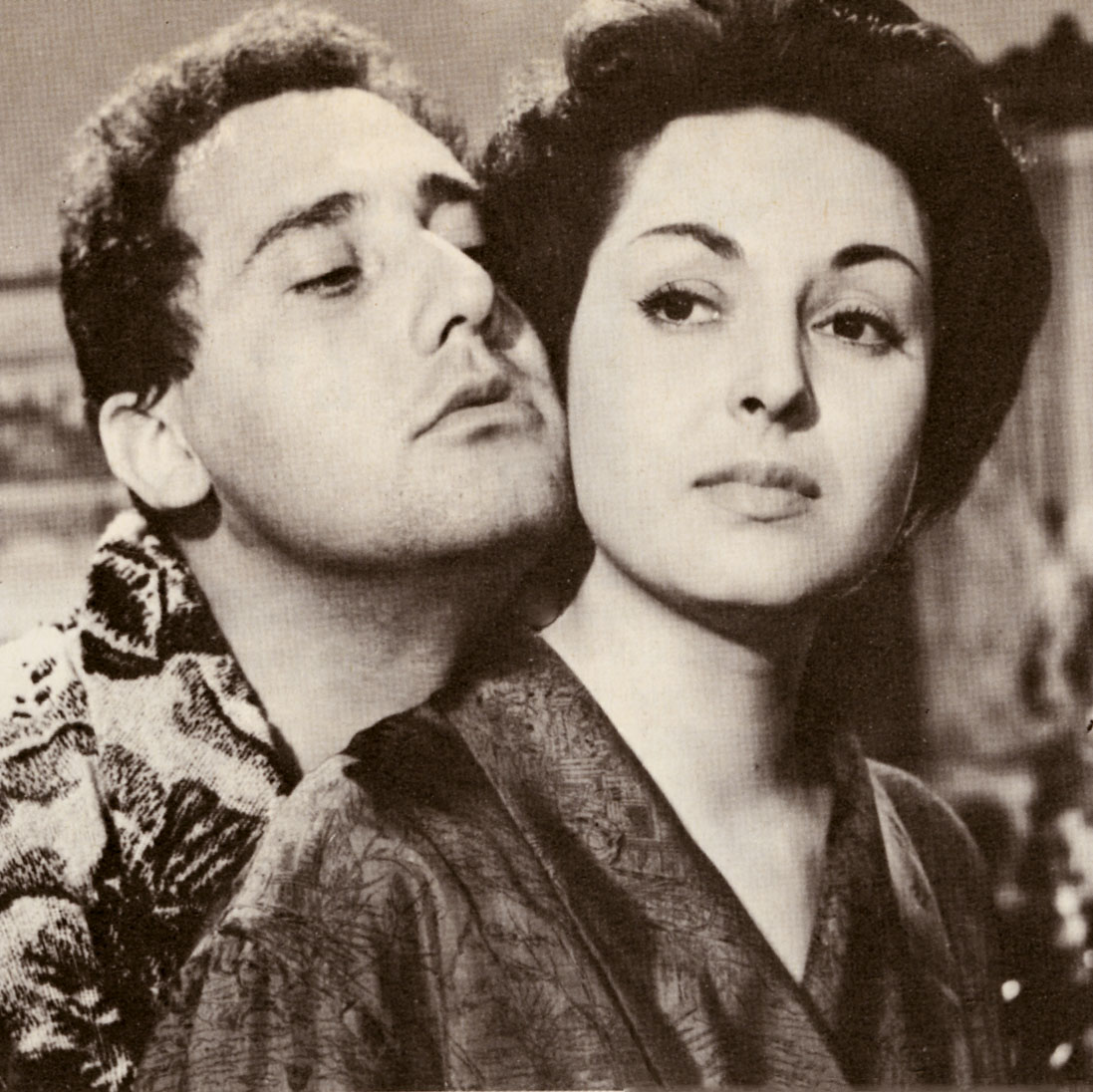
Sordi and Lea Padovani in Il seduttore (1954)

=== Actor ===
- Scipione l'africano (1937) as Comparsa soldato romano
- The Ferocious Saladin (1937) as The Lion
- Princess Tarakanova (1938) as Ciaruskin (uncredited)
- The Night of Tricks (1939) as Bentivoglio
- Cuori nella tormenta (1940) as Giulio Ferri
- The Hero of Venice (1941) as Aiutante del Veronese
- Le signorine della villa accanto (1941) as Un giovane invitato al ballo
- Giarabub (1942) as Il tenente Sordi
- The Three Pilots (1942) as Filippo Nardini
- La signorina (1942) as Nino
- After Casanova's Fashion (1942) as Un giocatore di biliardo
- Sant'Elena piccola isola (1943) as Il capitano Popleton
- Tre ragazze cercano marito (1944) as Giulio
- The Za-Bum Circus (1944) (segment "Galop finale al circo")
- Chi l'ha visto? (1945) as Un idraulico
- The Innocent Casimiro (1945) as Guido Corra
- His Young Wife (1945) as Camillo Barbarotti
- Il vento m'ha cantato una canzone (1947) as Paolo
- Flesh Will Surrender (1947) as Doberti
- Il Passatore (1947) as The Boyfriend
- Under the Sun of Rome (1948) as Fernando
- Che tempi! (1948) as Manuel Aguirre
- Cameriera bella presenza offresi... (1951) as Donato
- Mamma Mia, What an Impression! (1951) as Alberto
- Viva il cinema! (1952) as Narratore (voice)
- The White Sheik (1952) as Fernando Rivoli – The White Sheik
- Toto and the King of Rome (1952) as Il maestro elementare
- Giovinezza (1952) as Alberto
- The Piano Tuner Has Arrived (1952) as Avvocato Adolfo
- The Enchanting Enemy (1953) (uncredited)
- I Vitelloni (1953) as Alberto
- Cavalcade of Song (1953) as Alberto
- Ci troviamo in galleria (1953) as Mario Pio al telefono
- A Day in Court (1954) as Nando Moriconi
- Two Nights with Cleopatra (1954) as Cesarino
- Mid-Century Loves (1954) as Alberto (segment "Dopoguerra 1920")
- Marriage (1954) as Ivan Vassilievich Lomov
- Gran Varietà (1954) as Fregoli il trasformista (episodio 'Fregoli')
- A Slice of Life (1954) as L'amore (segment "Scusi, ma...")
- The Cheerful Squadron (1954) as Il soldato Vergisson
- Il seduttore (1954) as Alberto Ranieri
- It Happened at the Police Station (1954) as Alberto Tadini
- A Parisian in Rome (1954) as Alberto Lucetti
- Camilla (1954) as Il pappagallo in auto (voice, uncredited)
- An American in Rome (1954) as Nando Moriconi
- Via Padova 46 (Lo scocciatore) (1954) as Gianrico
- Tripoli, Beautiful Land of Love (1954) as Alberto
- The Art of Getting Along (1955) as Rosario 'Sasà' Scimoni
- The Sign of Venus (1955) as Romolo Proietti
- Buonanotte... avvocato! (1955) as Alberto Santi, advocate
- The Belle of Rome (1955) as Gracco
- Accadde al penitenziario (1955) as Giulio Parmitoni
- Bravissimo (1955) as Ubaldo Impallato
- I pappagalli (1955) as Dr. Alberto Tanzi
- The Letters Page (1955) as Rodolfo Vanzino
- Faccia da mascalzone (1956)
- The Bachelor (1956) as Paolo Anselmi
- Guardia, guardia scelta, brigadiere e maresciallo (1956) as Guardia Alberto Randolfi
- Nero's Weekend (1956) as Nero
- The Virtuous Bigamist (1956) as Mario – le chauffeur du car
- Allow Me, Daddy! (1956) as Rodolfo Nardi
- I pinguini ci guardano (1956) as an animal (voice)
- Arrivano i dollari! (1957) as Alfonso Pasti
- Souvenir d'Italie (1957) as Sergio Battistini
- A Hero of Our Times (1957) as Alberto Menichetti
- Count Max (1957) as Alberto Boccetti
- Doctor and the Healer (1957) as Corrado
- A Farewell to Arms (1957) as Father Galli
- Il marito (1958) as Alberto
- Ladro lui, ladra lei (1958) as Cencio
- Seventh Heaven (1958) as Xavier Laurentis
- Fortunella (1958) as Peppino
- Domenica è sempre domenica (1958) as Alberto Carboni
- Venezia, la luna e tu (1958) as Bepi
- Girls for the Summer (1958) as Aristarco Battistini
- ...And the Wild Wild Women (1959) as Antonio Zampi, detto Adone (uncredited)
- Policarpo (1959) as l'ambulante che vende ombrelli
- Oh, que Mambo! (1959) as Nando
- Winter Holidays (1959) as Roger Moretti
- The Moralist (1959) as Agostino
- Wild Cats on the Beach (1959) as Alberto
- The Great War (1959) as Oreste Jacovacci
- The Magliari (1959) as Totonno
- Il vedovo (1959) as Alberto Nardi
- Vacations in Majorca (1959) as Anselmo Pandolfini
- Everybody Go Home (1960) as Lt. Alberto Innocenzi
- The Traffic Policeman (1960) as Otello Celletti
- Crimen (1960) as Alberto Franzetti
- Gastone (1960) as Gastone
- The Last Judgment (1961) as Merchant of children
- The Best of Enemies (1961) as Capt. Blasi
- A Difficult Life (1961) as Silvio Magnozzi
- The Police Commissioner (1962) as Dante Lombardozzi
- Mafioso (1962) as Antonio Badalamenti
- Il diavolo (1963) as Amedeo Ferretti
- Il Boom (1963) as Giovanni Alberti
- The Teacher from Vigevano (1963) as Mombelli
- My Wife (1964) as The husband (segments "L'uccellino", "L'automobile") / Sartoletti (segment "Eritrea") / Marco (segments "I miei cari", "Luciana")
- Il disco volante (1964) as Vincenzo Berruti / Marsicano / Don Giuseppe / Conte Momi Crosara
- The Three Faces (1965) as Armando Tucci (segment "Latin Lover")
- Those Magnificent Men in Their Flying Machines (1965) as Count Emilio Ponticelli
- I complessi (1965) as Guglielmo Bertone (segment "Guglielmo il Dentone")
- Thrilling (1965) as Fernando Boccetta (segment "L'autostrada del sole")
- Made in Italy (1965) as Silvio, Errant Husband (segment "5 'La Famiglia', episode 2")
- Tentazioni proibite (1965) as Himself
- Fumo di Londra (1966) as Dante Fontana
- Our Husbands (1966) as Giovanni Lo Verso (segment "Il Marito di Roberta")
- Sex Quartet (1966) as Giovanni (segment "Fata Marta")
- Pardon, Are You For or Against? (1966) as Tullio Conforti
- The Witches (1967) as Elio Ferocci (segment "Senso Civico")
- An Italian in America (1967) as Giuseppe
- Be Sick... It's Free (1968) as Doctor Guido Tersilli
- Will Our Heroes Be Able to Find Their Friend Who Has Mysteriously Disappeared in Africa? (1968) as Fausto Di Salvio
- Help Me, My Love (1969) as Giovanni Macchiavelli
- The Conspirators (1969) as The Friar
- Il Prof. Dott. Guido Tersilli, primario della clinica Villa Celeste, convenzionata con le mutue (1969) as Dr. Guido Tersilli
- Let's Have a Riot (1970) as Don Giuseppe Montanari (segment "Il prete")
- Man and Wife (1970) as Giacinto Colonna (segment "La camera") / Antonio (segment "Il leone")
- The President of Borgorosso Football Club (1970) as Benito Fornaciari
- In Prison Awaiting Trial (1971) as Giuseppe Di Noi
- A Girl in Australia (1971) as Amedeo Battipaglia
- The Scientific Cardplayer (1972) as Peppino
- The Most Wonderful Evening of My Life (1972) as Alfredo Rossi
- Roma (1972) as Himself – Interviewé (uncredited)
- My Brother Anastasia (1973) as Father Salvatore Anastasia
- Polvere di stelle (1973) as Mimmo Adami
- While There's War There's Hope (1974) as Pietro Chiocca
- What's Your Sign? (1975) as Nando Moriconi (segment "Il fuoco")
- A Common Sense of Modesty (1976, first segment) as Giacinto Colonna
- Strange Occasion (1976) as Mons. Ascanio La Costa (segment "L'Ascensore")
- An Average Little Man (1977) as Giovanni Vivaldi
- I nuovi mostri (1977) as Il principe (segment "First Aid") / Il figlio (segment "Come una regina") / L'attore (segment "Elogio funebre")
- The Witness (1978) as Antonio Berti
- Where Are You Going on Holiday? (1978) as Remo Proietti (segment "Le vacanze intelligenti")
- Traffic Jam (1979) as Dr. De Benedetti, lawyer
- Hypochondriac (1979) as Argante
- Catherine and I (1980) as Enrico Menotti
- Il Marchese del Grillo (1981) as Onofrio Del Grillo / Gasperino
- I Know That You Know That I Know (1982) as Fabio Bonetti
- In viaggio con papà (1982) as Armando Ferretti
- Il tassinaro (1983) as Pietro Marchetti
- Everybody in Jail (1984) as Judge Annibale Salvemini
- Bertoldo, Bertoldino e Cacasenno (1984) as Friar Cipolla
- I Am an ESP (1985) as Roberto Razzi
- Troppo forte (1986) as Count Giangiacomo Pigna Corelli in Selci
- A Taxi Driver in New York (1987) as Pietro Marchetti
- Una botta di vita (1988) as Elvio Battistini
- The Betrothed (1989, TV Mini-Series) as Don Abbondio
- The Miser (1990) as Arpagone
- In the Name of the Sovereign People (1990) as Marchese Arquati
- Vacanze di Natale '91 (1991) as Sabino
- Acquitted for Having Committed the Deed (1992) as Emilio Garrone
- Nestore, l'ultima corsa (1994) as Gaetano
- The Story of a Poor Young Man (1995) as Mr. Bartoloni
- Incontri proibiti (1998) as Armando Andreoli (final film role)

=== Director ===
- Fumo di Londra (1966)
- Pardon, Are You For or Against? (1966)
- An Italian in America (1967)
- Help Me, My Love (1969)
- Man and Wife (1970, segment "La camera")
- Polvere di stelle (1973)
- While There's War There's Hope (1974)
- A Common Sense of Modesty (1976)
- Where Are You Going on Holiday? (1978, segment "Le vacanze intelligenti")
- Catherine and I (1980)
- I Know That You Know That I Know (1982)
- Journey with Papa (1982)
- Il tassinaro (1983)
- Everybody in Jail (1984)
- A Taxi Driver in New York (1987)
- Acquitted for Having Committed the Deed (1992)
- Nestore, l'ultima corsa (1994)
- Incontri proibiti (1998)

== Dubbing roles ==
=== Animation ===
- Narrator of segment 10 in Make Mine Music

=== Live action ===
- Oliver Hardy in Laurel and Hardy (1939–1951 redubs)
- Ollie in Swiss Miss
- Ollie in The Flying Deuces
- Ollie in A Chump at Oxford
- Pickpocket in Casablanca
- Jim Brennan in The Valley of Decision
- Nino in Abbasso la ricchezza!
- Ernie Bishop in It's a Wonderful Life
- Woody Herman in New Orleans
- Monte Loeffler in Humoresque
- Bicycle vendor in Bicycle Thieves
- Ercole Nardi in Sunday in August
- Fashion show presenter in Story of a Love Affair
- Narrator in Father's Dilemma
- Spike MacManus in State of the Union
- Sam in Somewhere in the Night
- Steven Warren in The Spiral Staircase
- Sergeant Beaufort in Fort Apache
- Professor Stevens in Abbott and Costello Meet Frankenstein
- Captain de Trevignac in The Garden of Allah
- Kid Callahan in City for Conquest
- Sid in Duel in the Sun
- Peter Virgil in Romance on the High Seas (singing voice)
- Hugo Barnstead in The Strawberry Blonde
- Jeb Rand in Pursued
- Jim Fairways in Rachel and the Stranger (singing voice)
- James Cody in The Treasure of the Sierra Madre
- Ed Landers in Cheyenne
- Tommy Chamberlain in The Bachelor and the Bobby-Soxer
- Neff in Panic in the Streets
- Marino in Body and Soul
- Ed Garzah in The Naked City
- Dakota in Destination Tokyo
- Bill Hughes in You Can't Take It with You
- Frank Reardon in Blood on the Moon
- Giuseppe in Sahara
- Hawley in The Gal Who Took the West
- Fred Lord in Sorry, Wrong Number
- Nat Sperling in The Big Clock
- Torquato Torquati in Where Is Freedom?
- Major A. M. Bagley in Air Force
- John Withers in The Letter
- Cole Porter in Night and Day (singing voice)
- David Winthrop in Mexican Hayride
- Bartender / Hotel clerk in Tall in the Saddle

== Theatre ==
=== Actor ===
- 1969–1966: San Giovanni with Aldo Fabrizi and Anna Fougez
- 1969–1939: Ma in campagna è un'altra... rosa (In the country it's another... rose), with Guido Riccioli and Nanda Primavera
- 1969–1942: Tutto l'oro del mondo (All the gold in the world), with Guido Fineschi and Maria Donati
- 1942–1943: Teatro della caricatura (Theatre of the caricature), with Fanfulla
- 1943–1944: Ritorna Za-Bum, by Marcello Marchesi, directed by Mario Mattòli
- Sai che ti dico? (You know what I am saying to you?), by Marcello Marchesi, directed by Mario Mattòli
- 1944–1945: Un mondo di armonie (A world of harmonies), musical revue by Alberto Semprini
- Imputati... alziamoci! (Suspects... arise!), by Michele Galdieri 666 the divel
- 1945–1946: Soffia so'..., by Pietro Garinei and Sandro Giovannini
- Soffia so'... n. 2, by Pietro Garinei and Sandro Giovannini
- 1947–1948: E lui dice... (And he says...), by Benecoste, directed by Oreste Biancoli and Adolfo Celi
- 1952–1953: Gran baraonda (Total chaos), by Pietro Garinei and Sandro Giovannini, with Wanda Osiris

== Composer and singer ==
- 1966: You never told me (Sordi – Piccioni), sung by Lydia MacDonald in the movie Fumo di Londra and in Italian by Mina with title Breve amore
- 1966: Richmond bridge (Sordi – Piccioni), sung by Lydia MacDonald in the movie Fumo di Londra
- 1973: Ma 'ndo... Hawaii? (Sordi – Piccioni), sung by Alberto Sordi and Monica Vitti in the movie Polvere di stelle

== Sources ==
- Satta, Gloria (2013). Alberto Sordi e la sua Roma. Rome: Gangemi Editore. ISBN 978-88-492-7577-3.
- Righetti, Igor (2020). Alberto Sordi segreto: Amori nascosti, manie, rimpianti, maldicenze. Rubbettino Editore. ISBN 978-88-498-6287-4.
- Fava, Claudio G. (2003). Alberto Sordi. Rome: Gremese Editore. ISBN 88-8440-257-3.
- Mallozzi, Giuseppe (2023). Alberto Sordi: Quaderni di Visioni Corte Film Festival. Ali Ribelli Edizioni. ISBN 979-12-5540-106-3.
