= Rodolfo Sonego =

Italian screenwriter (1921–2000)

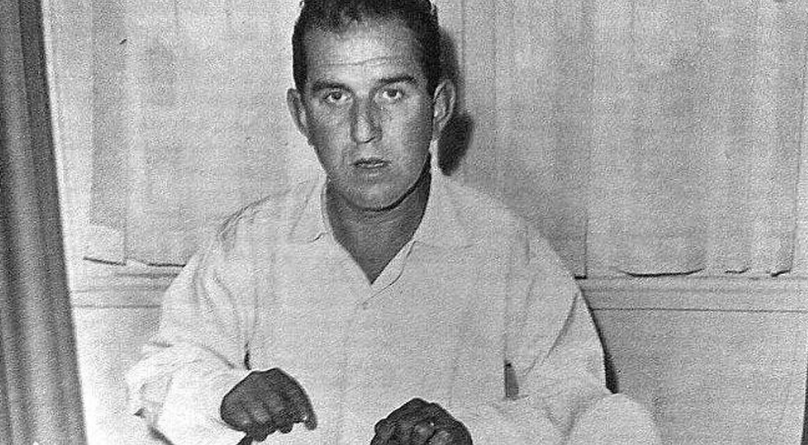
- Born: 27 February 1921; Cavarzano (Belluno), Veneto, Italy
- Died: 15 October 2000 (aged 79); Rome, Italy

Rodolfo Sonego (27 February 1921 – 15 October 2000) was an Italian screenwriter.

He wrote Commedia all'italiana films such as A Difficult Life, Il vedovo, and The Traffic Policeman.

== Life and career ==
Born in Cavarzano, Belluno, Sonego graduated at the Accademia di Belle Arti in Turin and started an activity as painter and illustrator. During the war he was a partisan, becoming leader of the Fratelli Bandiera Brigade.

After the war Sonego, known for his great communication skills and for his ability in recounting his war experiences, entered the cinema industry as a consulent for several films dedicated to partisan movements during the war. Moved to Rome, he initially collaborated to the screenplays of a number of dramas, working with directors such as Giuseppe De Santis, Alberto Lattuada and Carlo Lizzani. In 1954 he met Alberto Sordi for the screenplay of the comedy film Il seduttore and from then he started a long collaboration with the actor, writing, sometimes uncredited, over 50 films starred by Sordi.

== Selected filmography ==
- Anna (1951)
- Shadows on the Grand Canal (1951)
- Rome 11:00 (1952)
- It Happened in the Park (1953)
- Camilla (1954)
- The Beach (1954)
- A Hero of Our Times (1955)
- Toto and Carolina (1955)
- Count Max (1957)
- Il marito (1957)
- The Widower (1959)
- The Moralist (1959)
- Crimen (1960)
- The Traffic Policeman (1960)
- A Difficult Life (1961)
- The Italian Brigands (1962)
- To Bed or Not to Bed (1963)
- The Commandant (1963)
- Il disco volante (1964)
- I complessi (1965)
- Thrilling (1965)
- The Girl with the Pistol (1968)
- Help Me, My Love (1969)
- Satyricon (1969)
- A Girl in Australia (1971)
- The Scientific Cardplayer (1972)
- A Brief Vacation (1973)
- Two Missionaries (1974)
- Di che segno sei? (1975)
- Strange Occasion (1976)
- A Common Sense of Modesty (1976)
- Wifemistress (1977)
- The Cat (1977)
- The Witness (1978)
- Where Are You Going on Holiday? (1978)
- Catherine and I (1980)
- Journey with Papa (1982)
- Everybody in Jail (1984)
- Troppo forte (1986)
- A Taxi Driver in New York (1987)
- The Miser (1990)
- Acquitted for Having Committed the Deed (1992)
- Household Accounts (2003)
