= Claudia Cardinale filmography =

- Film: 103
- Television film: 8
- Television series: 8
- Television show: 2
- Documentary: 26
- Narrating: 2
- Theatre: 5
- Others: see

This is a list representing the Claudia Cardinale filmography. It also includes her documentary appearances, television roles, voice-dubbing roles and stage appearances.

== Feature films ==
Title	Year	Role(s)	Director	Notes	Ref.
Goha	1958	Amina	Jacques Baratier		
Big Deal on Madonna Street	1958	Carmelina Nicosia	Mario Monicelli		
Three Strangers in Rome	1958	Marisa	Claudio Gora		
Venetian Honeymoon	1959	Angelica	Alberto Cavalcanti		
The Magistrate	1959	Maria	Luigi Zampa		
The Facts of Murder	1959	Assuntina Jacovacci	Pietro Germi		
Audace colpo dei soliti ignoti	1959	Carmelina Nicosia	Nanni Loy		
Upstairs and Downstairs	1959	Maria	Ralph Thomas		
Vento del sud	1959	Grazia Macrì	Enzo Provenzale		
Il bell'Antonio	1960	Barbara Puglisi	Mauro Bolognini		
Austerlitz	1960	Pauline Bonaparte	Abel Gance		
Rocco and His Brothers	1960	Ginetta Giannelli	Luchino Visconti		
Silver Spoon Set	1960	Fedora Santini	Francesco Maselli		
Girl with a Suitcase	1961	Aida Zepponi	Valerio Zurlini		
Auguste	1961	Unnamed woman	Pierre Chevalier	Cameo appearance	
The Lovemakers	1961	Bianca	Mauro Bolognini		
The Lions Are Loose	1961	Albertine Ferran	Henri Verneuil		
Cartouche	1962	Venus	Philippe de Broca		
Careless	1962	Angiolina Zarri	Mauro Bolognini		
8½	1963	Claudia	Federico Fellini		
The Leopard	1963	Angelica Sedara	Luchino Visconti		
The Pink Panther	1963	Princess Dala	Blake Edwards		
La ragazza di Bube	1963	Mara Castellucci	Luigi Comencini		
Time of Indifference	1964	Carla Ardengo	Francesco Maselli		
Circus World	1964	Toni Alfredo	Henry Hathaway		
The Magnificent Cuckold	1964	Maria Grazia	Antonio Pietrangeli		
Sandra	1965	Sandra Dawdson	Luchino Visconti		
Blindfold	1965	Vicky Vincenti	Philip Dunne		
Lost Command	1966	Aicha Mahidi	Mark Robson		
The Professionals	1966	Maria Grant	Richard Brooks		
Sex Quartet	1966	Armenia	Mario Monicelli	Segment: "Fata Armenia"	
A Rose for Everyone	1966	Rosa	Franco Rossi		
Don't Make Waves	1967	Laura Califatti	Alexander Mackendrick		
The Day of the Owl	1968	Rosa Nicolosi	Damiano Damiani		
The Hell with Heroes	1968	Elena	Joseph Sargent		
A Fine Pair	1968	Esmeralda Marini	Francesco Maselli		
Once Upon a Time in the West	1968	Jill McBain	Sergio Leone		
Diary of a Telephone Operator	1969	Marta Chiaretti	Marcello Fondato		
The Conspirators	1969	Giuditta Di Castro	Luigi Magni		
The Red Tent	1969	Nurse Valeria	Mikhail Kalatozov		
The Adventures of Gerard	1970	Theresa	Jerzy Skolimowski		
The Butterfly Affair	1971	Popsy Pop	Jean Vautrin		
A Girl in Australia	1971	Carmela	Alberto Sordi		
The Audience	1972	Aiche	Marco Ferreri		
The Legend of Frenchie King	1972	Maria Sarrazin	Christian-Jaque		
La Scoumoune	1972	Georgia	José Giovanni		
One Russian Summer	1973	Anya	Antonio Calenda		
Blood Brothers	1974	Lucia Esposito	Pasquale Squitieri		
Conversation Piece	1974	Professor's wife	Luchino Visconti	Cameo appearance	
Libera, My Love	1975	Libera Valente	Mauro Bolognini		
The Immortal Bachelor	1975	Gabriella Sansoni	Marcello Fondato		
Blonde in Black Leather	1975	Laura	Carlo Di Palma		
A Common Sense of Modesty	1976	Armida Ballarin	Alberto Sordi	Segment: "Terzo episodio"	
I Am the Law	1977	Anna Torrini	Pasquale Squitieri		
Goodbye & Amen	1977	Aliki De Mauro	Damiano Damiani		
L'arma	1978	Marta Compagna	Pasquale Squitieri		
Fire's Share	1978	Catherine Hansen	Étienne Périer		
Father of the Godfathers	1978	Rosa Accordino	Pasquale Squitieri		
Little Girl in Blue Velvet	1978	Francesca Modigliani	Alan Bridges		
Escape to Athena	1979	Eleana	George P. Cosmatos		
Si salvi chi vuole	1980	Luisa Morandini	Roberto Faenza		
The Salamander	1981	Elena Leporello	Peter Zinner		
The Skin	1981	Princess Consuelo Caracciolo	Liliana Cavani		
Fitzcarraldo	1982	Molly	Werner Herzog		
Trail of the Pink Panther	1982	Princess Dala	Blake Edwards	Cameo appearance	
Bankers Also Have Souls	1982	Antonella Defour	Michel Lang		
Le Ruffian	1983	La Baronne	José Giovanni		
Henry IV	1984	Matilda	Marco Bellocchio		
Claretta	1984	Claretta Petacci	Pasquale Squitieri		
Woman of Wonders	1985	Maura	Alberto Bevilacqua		
Next Summer	1985	Jeanne Severin	Nadine Trintignant		
A Man in Love	1987	Julia Steiner	Diane Kurys		
Hiver 54, l'abbé Pierre	1989	Hélène	Denis Amar		
The Battle of the Three Kings	1990	Roxelane	Souheil Ben-Barka		
Mayrig	1991	Mayrig	Henri Verneuil		
588 rue paradis	1992	Mayrig	Henri Verneuil		
Son of the Pink Panther	1993	Maria Gambrelli	Blake Edwards		
Elles ne pensent qu'à ça...	1994	Margaux	Charlotte Dubreuil		
A Summer in La Goulette	1996	Herself	Férid Boughedir	Cameo appearance	
Sous les pieds des femmes	1997	Aya	Rachida Krim		
Stupor mundi	1997	Constance of Aragon	Pasquale Squitieri		
Riches, belles, etc.	1998	Baroness Mitzy	Bunny Godillot		
Li chiamarono... briganti!	1999	Assunta	Pasquale Squitieri		
And Now... Ladies and Gentlemen	2002	Madame Falconetti	Claude Lelouch		
The Demon Stirs	2005	Herself	Marie-Pascale Osterrieth	Cameo appearance	
Cherche fiancé tous frais payés	2007	Elisabeth	Aline Issermann		
The String	2009	Sara	Mahdi Ben Attia		
Signora Enrica	2010	Enrica	Ali Ilhan		
A View of Love	2010	Marc's mother	Nicole Garcia		
Father	2011	Elvira	Pasquale Squitieri		
Gebo and the Shadow	2012	Doroteia	Manoel de Oliveira		
The Artist and the Model	2012	Léa	Fernando Trueba		
Joy de V.	2013	Mrs. Morisini	Nadia Szold		
The Silent Mountain	2014	Nuria Calzolari	Ernst Gossner		
Les Francis	2014	Mina	Fabrice Begotti		
Effie Gray	2014	Viscountess	Richard Laxton		
Ultima fermata	2015	Rosa	Giambattista Assanti		
All Roads Lead to Rome	2015	Carmen	Ella Lemhagen		
Una gita a Roma	2016	Marguerite	Karin Proia		
Nobili bugie	2016	Romola Valli	Antonio Pisu		
Rudy Valentino: Divo dei divi	2017	Aunt Rosa	Nico Cirasola		
Rogue City	2020	Catarina Bastiani	Olivier Marchal		
The Island of Forgiveness	2022	Agostina	Ridha Behi	Final film role	

== Short films ==
Title	Year	Role(s)	Director	Notes
Anneaux d'or	1956	Young arab girl	René Vautier	
Claudia Cardinale	1965	Herself	Harry Kümel	Self-promoting short film
La amante estelar	1968	Claudia	Antonio De Lara	
Un café… l'addition	1999	Mme Gigi	Félicie Dutertre	
Essere Claudia Cardinale	2005	Herself	Stefano Mordini	Docu-short film
Io Claudia	2011	Herself	Pasquale Squitieri	Docu-short film
The Blind and the Cardinal	2015	The Cardinal	Frédérick Laurent	

== Documentary films ==
Title	Year	Director	Notes
Burden of Dreams	1982	Les Blank	Documentary filmed during the production of Fitzcarraldo
Stelle emigranti	1983	Francesco Bortolini	Documentary about the lives of Italian actresses' careers in International film industry
Ben Webster: The Brute and the Beautiful	1990	John Jeremy	Documentary about the life of Ben Webster
Claudia Cardinale, la più bella italiana di Tunisi	1994	Mahmoud Ben Mahmoud	Autobiographical documentary
Gianni di Venanzo: Un grande autore della fotografia	1996	Alan Bacchello	Documentary about the life of Gianni di Venanzo
Cannes… les 400 coups	1997	Gilles Nadeau	Documentary about the Cannes Film Festival
My Best Fiend	1999	Werner Herzog	Documentary about the relationship between Herzog and actor Klaus Kinski
Luchino Visconti	1999	Carlo Lizzani	Documentary about Luchino Visconti
Vamps et femme fatales	2001	Nguyen Trong Binh	Documentary about European's female film stars
Fellini: I'm a Born Liar	2002	Damian Pettigrew	Documentary about film director Federico Fellini's life
The Magic of Fellini	2003	Carmen Piccini	Documentary about the life and career of Federico Fellini
The Life and Times of Count Luchino Visconti	2003	Adam Low	BBC special about Luchino Visconti
Frammenti di Novecento	2004	Francesco Maselli	Documentary which follows the history of Italy from mid-30s to mid-60s
Sergio Leone: The Way I See Things	2006	Giulio Reale	Documentary about film director Sergio Leone's life and career
Marcello: A Sweet Life	2006	Annarosa Morri	Memorial documentary about the life of Marcello Mastroianni
La traversée du désir	2009	Arielle Dombasle	Dombalse's documentary about the concept of desire
Pietro Germi - Il bravo, il bello, il cattivo	2009	Claudio Bondì	Documentary about the life of Pietro Germi
Hollywood sul Tevere	2009	Marco Spagnoli	Documentary about the history of Cinecittà Studios between 1950s and 1970s
Belmondo, itinéraire	2011	Vincent Perrot	Documentary about the life of Jean-Paul Belmondo
The Story of Film: An Odyssey	2011	Mark Cousins	Documentary about the history of film
L'insolito ignoto	2012	Sergio Naitza	Documentary about the life of actor Tiberio Murgia
Alberto il grande	2013	Carlo Verdone, Luca Verdone	Memorial documentary about Alberto Sordi
Alfredo Bini, ospite inatteso	2015	Simone Isola	Documentary about the life and career of Alfredo Bini
Il principe delle pezze	2019	Alessandro Di Ronza	Documentary about the career of Catello Russo
Claudia la mystérieuse	2019	Marie-Dominique Montel, Christopher Jones	Autobiographical documentary
Ennio	2021	Giuseppe Tornatore	Documentary about the life and career of composer Ennio Morricone

== Television ==
Title	Year	Role(s)	Network	Notes
Jesus of Nazareth	1977	The Adultress	Rai 1	4 episodes
Princess Daisy	1983	Anabelle de Fourdemont Valensky	NBC	Television film
La Storia	1986	Ida Ramundo	Rai 2	Television film
Naso di cane	1986	Laura	Rai 2	3 episodes
Blu elettrico	1988	Tata	Rai 1	Television film
La Révolution française	1989	Yolande de Polastron	Rai 1	Television film
Flash - Der Fotoreporter	1993	Gilda Ricci / Monica Ricci	ZDF	Episode: "Das Zweite Gesicht der Aida"
10-07: L'affaire Zeus	1995	Agent	Noovo	4 episodes
Nostromo	1997	Teresa Viola	BBC Two	4 episodes
Desert of Fire	1997	Leila	Canale 5	3 episodes
Mia, Liebe meines Lebens	1998	Mary O'Sullivan	Rai 1	Television film
Élisabeth - Ils sont tous nos enfants	2000	Claude Barde	Rai 1	Television film
Miss Italia 2003	2003	Herself	Rai 1	Annual beauty contest (jury president)
Hold-up à l'italienne	2008	Cécile Deschamps	TF1	Television film
Il giorno della Shoah	2010	Ester	Rai 1	Television film
Sanremo Music Festival 2014	2014	Herself / Guest	Rai 1	Annual music festival
The law of	2016	Irène Delamarche	France 3	Episode: "La Loi de Julien - Le Bon Fils"
Il bello delle donne… alcuni anni dopo	2017	Laura Banti	Canale 5	5 episodes
Bulle	2020	Marthe	RTS Un	Miniseries

== Voice dubbing roles ==
Title	Year	Role(s)	Director	Notes
Alex et Marie	1994	Narrator (voice)	Josée de Luca	
African Cats	2011	Narrator (voice)	Alastair Fothergill	

== Stage, theatre and live performance ==
Title	Year	Role(s)	Stage	Notes
La Veniexiana	2000	Angela	Rond-Point Theatre, Paris	
The Glass Menagerie	2006–2007	Amanda Wingfield	Italian tour	
Concerto per la pace	2009	Herself	La Fenice Theatre, Venice	
Un dialogo con Alberto Moravia	2010	Herself	Cinémathèque Française, Paris	
The Odd Couple	2017–2018	Olivia Madison	Italian tour	
