= Luca De Filippo =

Italian actor (1948–2015)

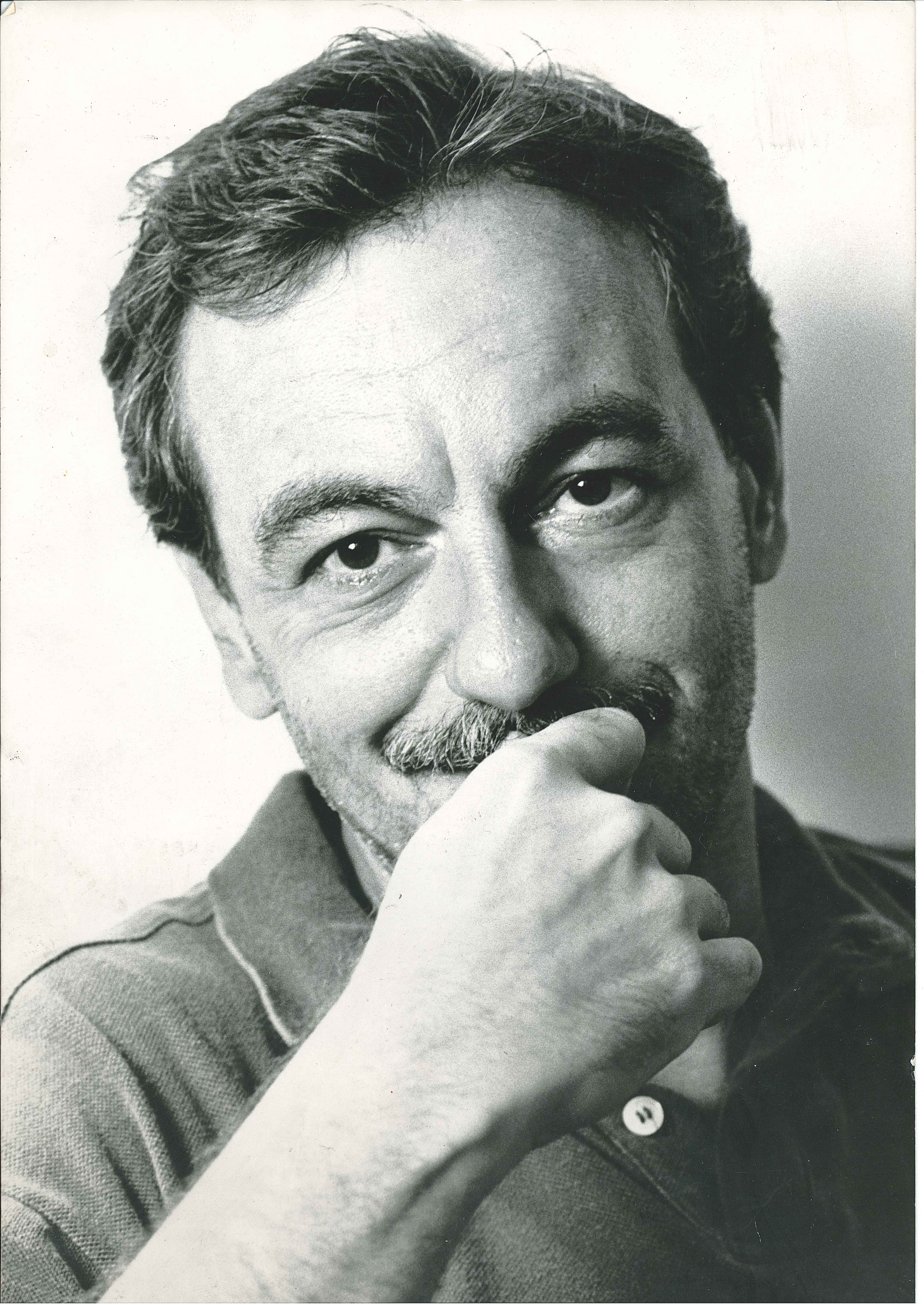

Luca De Filippo (3 June 1948 – 27 November 2015) was an Italian actor and director of theatre. De Filippo was born in Rome to Eduardo De Filippo and the singer and actress Thea Prandi. He married Carolina Rosi, the daughter of director Francesco Rosi in 2013. They had many theatrical experiences. De Filippo's career started in 1955, at the age of 7, playing Peppeniello in Poverty and Nobility by Eduardo Scarpetta, directed by his father. Luca took part, both in theater and in the TV versions, of Saturday, Sunday and Monday and Filumena Marturano.

Luca De Filippo had many film and television appearances under the name of Luca Della Porta, including, along with Helmut Berger, Young Tigers (1967), directed by Antonio Leonviola; with Carlo Giuffrè, the television series That shop Piazza Navona (1969), directed by Mino Guerrini; always for television works in Petrosenella and scenes of Naples (1982). Then it was the turn of the series Naso di cane, directed by Pasquale Squitieri, with Claudia Cardinale (1985); then de Blackmail, directed by various directors, starring, among others, Massimo Ranieri and Kim Rossi Stuart.
