= Il giorno della Shoah =

Italian television drama film about the Holocaust

Il giorno della Shoah is a 2010 Italian language film written and directed by Pasquale Squitieri.

== Cast ==
- Giorgio Albertazzi as Alberto
- Anna Carabetta as Elvira
- Claudia Cardinale as Ester
- Fabio Collepiccolo as Arturo
- Mario Gagliardi as Carlo
- Ennio Girolami as Nello
- Tony Kendall as German Nazi
- Marino Masé as Mario
- Alberto Mastellone as Vittorio
- Salvatore Puntillo as Alvaro
- Anna Tognetti as Celeste
