= Naso di cane =

- Genre: Crime drama
- Written by: Pasquale Squitieri; Lino Iannuzzi; Attilio Veraldi
- Story by: Attilio Veraldi
- Directed by: Pasquale Squitieri
- Starring: Luca De Filippo; Claudia Cardinale; Nancy Brilli
- Composer: Tullio De Piscopo
- Country of origin: Italy
- No. of seasons: 1
- No. of episodes: 3

Production
- Producer: Augusto Caminito
- Cinematography: Eugenio Bentivoglio
- Running time: 240 min.

Original release
- Network: Rai 1
- Release: December 11 – December 19, 1986

Naso di cane (also known as A Dog's Nose) is a 1986 Italian crime-drama television miniseries, written and directed by Pasquale Squitieri and starring Luca De Filippo. It is loosely based on a novel of the same name written by Attilio Veraldi, who also collaborated on the screenplay.

== Plot ==
Due to a series of unfortunate circumstances, Ciro Mele, nicknamed "Naso 'e cane" (Dog Nose), kills a dangerous Camorra boss. Despite the lack of evidence, the police start an investigation into him. Ciro has a police commissioner friend who tries to persuade him in vain to leave the area. However, Ciro will be ultimately killed during a shootout.

== Cast ==
- Luca De Filippo as Police Commissioner Corrado Apicella
- Nigel Court as Ciro Mele, aka "Naso 'e cane"
- Claudia Cardinale as Laura
- Donald Pleasence as Olindo Cuomo
- Raymond Pellegrin as Antonio Garofalo
- Yorgo Voyagis as Achille Ammirato
- Nancy Brilli as Rosa
- Marzio Honorato as Rassetiello
- Giuseppe Cederna as Merdillo
- Victor Cavallo as Nichiello
- Salvatore Billa as Salvatore Palestra
