= Shadow of a Doubt (1993 film) =

- Directed by: Aline Issermann
- Written by: Aline Issermann; Frédérique Gruyer; Aline Issermann
- Produced by: Alain Depardieu
- Starring: Mireille Perrier; Alain Bashung; Sandrine Blancke
- Cinematography: Darius Khondji
- Edited by: Hervé Schneid
- Music by: Reno Isaac
- Distributed by: Pan Européenne Distribution
- Release date: October 20, 1993
- Running time: 105 minutes
- Country: France
- Language: French

Shadow of a Doubt (French: L'ombre du doute) is a 1993 French drama film written and directed by Aline Issermann.

The film was entered into the main competition at the 50th Venice International Film Festival.

== Cast ==
- Mireille Perrier: Mother
- Alain Bashung: Father
- Sandrine Blancke: Alexandrine
- Emmanuelle Riva: Grandmother
- Michel Aumont: Grandfather
- Josiane Balasko: Sophia
- Luis Issermann: Pierre
- Roland Bertin: Juge
- Dominique Lavanant: Teacher
- Thierry Lhermitte: Alexandrine's Lawyer
- Jean-Pierre Sentier: Lawyer Toussaint
- Féodor Atkine: Thérapeute
- Isabelle Petit-Jacques: Thérapeute
- Cynthia Gavas: Inspector
- Eric Franklin: Inspector
- Simon de La Brosse: Inspector
