= Atto di dolore =

- Directed by: Pasquale Squitieri
- Starring: Claudia Cardinale
- Cinematography: Romano Albani
- Release date: 1990
- Country: Italy
- Language: Italian

Atto di dolore is an Italian film released in 1990. It stars Claudia Cardinale.

== Plot ==
In Milan, Elena (Cardinale), widowed, has to raise her two children Martina and Sandro alone. Life takes a turn for the worse when Sandro becomes a drug addict. Despite his mother's attempts, the boy is unable to rid of his addiction. Sandro becomes violent towards his mother and she eventually decides to kill him.

== Cast ==
- Claudia Cardinale: Elena
- Bruno Cremer: Armando
- Karl Zinny: Sandro
- Giulia Boschi: Martina
- Memè Perlini: Ramella
- Ferruccio De Ceresa: Salvi
- Enrico Lo Verso: Geraci
- Clara Colosimo: Contessa Cini
- Gabriele Muccino: Zico
