= Francesca Cardinale =

Italian actress

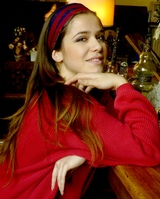
Francesca Cardinale

Francesca Cardinale (born 1990 in Rome) is an Italian actress. She is the niece of the actress Claudia Cardinale.

Cardinale has acted in Ton absence (Anni Felici, 2013, Daniele Luchetti), The Canvas (2015, Sergio Rubini), The Cure (2015, Andrea Andolina), Una gita a Roma (2015, Karin Proia), and Pacífico (Gonzalo Gutiérrez, film shot in Colombia and at present in post-production).

== Biography ==
=== Studies ===
Francesca Cardinale completed her studies at Centro Sperimentale di Cinematografia in 2013.

Her professional training includes: UNESCO, Social and Human Science Dep. (2014, Paris), residential workshop on Hamlet with Roberto Herlitzka (2014, Campania, Italy), Actors Workshops with Ivana Chubbuck (2012, Rome and Los Angeles), Workshop with Bernard Hiller (2012, Los Angeles), Circus Training, La Torre (2012, Rome), Teatro Azione (2010, Rome), Liceo Linguistico per le Arti dello Spettacolo Le Muse (2005–2009, Nettuno, Italy), Workshop at The University of Surrey (2005, Guilford, GB).

=== Professional activity ===
Francesca Cardinale's activity for broadcast television includes: I liceali (2009, Italia Uno, Mediaset, Lucio Pellegrini), Il Sorteggio (2009, RAI Uno, Giacomo Campiotti).

Francesca Cardinale's voice and image for advertising includes: promotional clip for the TV program Ballarò on RAI Tre (2012) directed by Paolo Genovese, promotional clip for the Italian Association of Obstetrics, The Adventure of the Day After (2014) directed by Carlotta Cerquetti.

Francesca Cardinale's theatrical activity includes her participation to an international tour with the Pippo del Bono Theater Company to Moscow in 2014, to the staging of two productions for the Quartieri dell'Arte Festival (Caprarola): Faust by Fernando Pessoa, directed by Alessio Pizzech (2012) and Living under Glass by Ewald Palmetshofer, directed by Marco Bellocchi (2013), and for Teatro Tor di Nona (Rome): <Sin> (2013) directed by Fabrizio Parenti.

Francesca Cardinale's activity for Public Events includes: The Woman’s View held by the Vatican's Pontifical Council for Culture at Teatro Argentina (Rome, 2015), Celebration for One Hundred Years of Solitude by Gabriel Garcia Marquez directed by Juan Diego Puerta Lopez, held by the Roma Tre University at Teatro Palladium (Rome, 2015), Fashion & Cinema for The Cinema Island (Rome, Isola Tiberina 2015), Bellissima, a Performance for Being & Appearing an exhibition by Vanessa Beecroft (MAXXI, Rome, 2014).
