= Father of the Godfathers =

- Directed by: Pasquale Squitieri
- Screenplay by: Orazio Barrese; Massimo De Rita; Arduino Maiuri; Pasquale Squitieri
- Based on: I complici: gli anni dell'antimafia by Orazio Barrese
- Produced by: Mario Cecchi Gori
- Starring: Giuliano Gemma; Claudia Cardinale; Francisco Rabal; Stefano Satta Flores
- Cinematography: Eugenio Bentivoglio
- Music by: Ennio Morricone
- Production company: Capital Film
- Distributed by: Cineriz
- Release date: 4 November 1978 (Italy)
- Running time: 120 minutes
- Country: Italy
- Box office: ₤ 2.304 billion

Father of the Godfathers (Italian: Corleone) is a 1978 Italian crime film directed by Pasquale Squitieri. It stars Claudia Cardinale, Giuliano Gemma, and Tony Kendall and is set in Sicily in the 1950s. Gemma was awarded 1979 Best Actor at the Montréal World Film Festival for his role.

== Cast ==
- Giuliano Gemma: Vito Gargano
- Claudia Cardinale: Rosa Accordino
- Francisco Rabal: Don Giusto Provenzano
- Stefano Satta Flores: Lawyer Natale Calia
- Michele Placido: Michele Labruzzo
- Salvatore Billa: Carmelo
- Remo Girone: Biagio Lo Cascio
- Enrico Maisto: Matteo Aqueci
- Tommaso Palladino: Vincenzo Campisi
- Tony Kendall: Totò Sferlazzo
- Orazio Orlando: Prosecutor

== Production ==
Father of the Godfathers was inspired by Orazio Barrese's book I complici, Gli anni dell'antimafia. The book was the story of the Mafia boss Luciano Liggio. After the release of Squitieri's previous film I Am the Law, Mario Cecchi Gori approached him to make an adaptation. Barrese and Squitieri were friends, but later stated that "I don't consider Father of the Godfathers as one of my best works, it's definitely inferior to I Am the Law."

== Release ==
Father of the Godfathers was distributed theatrically in Italy by Cineriz on 4 November 1978. Film historian and critic Roberto Curti stated that the film was a huge commercial success in Italy, grossing 2,304,300,190 Italian lire.

== Reception ==
From a contemporary review, film critic Lino Micciche wrote that the film "is harmed by the multiplicity of tones, rhythms and styles, which foul up the results in both directions it aims at, therefore the film oscillates [...] between popular ballad and turgid comic book, historical recreation and inquiry, the Western genre and committed cinema, echoing from time to time Germi and Rosi, Petri and Damiani[...]."

== Notes ==
=== References ===
- Curti, Roberto (2013). Italian Crime Filmography, 1968-1980. McFarland. ISBN 978-0786469765.
