= Father (2011 film) =

- Directed by: Pasquale Squitieri
- Written by: Pasquale Squitieri
- Produced by: Eduardo Buonocore; Massimiliano Collalti
- Cinematography: Giuseppe Tinelli
- Edited by: Flavio Bernard; Francesca Guarino
- Music by: Luigi Ceccarelli
- Release date: 2011
- Running time: 120 minutes
- Language: English

Father is a 2011 French thriller film directed by Pasquale Squitieri. It stars Franco Nero, Andrea Fachinetti, Daniel Baldock and Claudia Cardinale. It was screened at the Bari International Film Festival.
