= Stefano Satta Flores =

Italian actor (1937–1985)

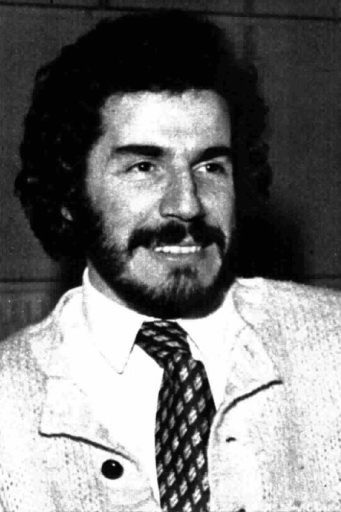
- Satta Flores in the magazine Radiocorriere (1974)
- Born: 14 January 1937; Naples, Kingdom of Italy
- Died: 22 October 1985 (aged 48); Rome, Italy
- Occupations: Actor; voice actor; playwright
- Years active: 1962–1984
- Spouses: Teresa Ricci; Carla Tedesco
- Children: 2

Stefano Satta Flores (14 January 1937 – 22 October 1985) was an Italian actor and voice actor.

== Biography ==
Born in Naples, Italy, Satta Flores graduated from the Centro Sperimentale di Cinematografia in the Italian capital city of Rome. He began acting in amateur dramatics at the Piccolo Teatro, where he acted in Shakespeare and Sbragia plays. He made his cinema debut in the film The Lizards (I basilischi), premiered by filmmaker Lina Wertmüller in 1963.

In 1971, Satta Flores appeared in the film Four Flies on Grey Velvet but did not really establish himself in cinema until 1974, when he appeared in Ettore Scola's film We All Loved Each Other So Much where he shared leading roles with Stefania Sandrelli, Vittorio Gassman, Nino Manfredi, Aldo Fabrizi and Giovanna Ralli.

Satta Flores also appeared in the 1973 films The Funny Face of the Godfather and Teresa the Thief. His last film appearance before his death was in One Hundred Days in Palermo. He was best known for playing a variety of roles in more than 60 films. He was also a voice dubber. His role as the smuggler and rakish hero Han Solo (portrayed by Harrison Ford) in the Italian dub of the Star Wars original trilogy was instrumental in establishing the importance of star power in Italian voice acting. He also used his voice talents in Alien, as the fearless Captain Dallas, as well as in 10, as the romantically-obsessed songwriter George Webber.

An eloquent spokesman on artistic and social issues of the day, he also was a respected playwright and occasionally acted in television programs. A political commitment, he founded the company I compagni di scena (The Companions of the Scene) with which he devoted himself to research work on alternative tests.

== Death ==
Satta Flores died in Rome on 22 October 1985 at the age of 48, following complications from leukemia treatment. In the Italian version of Star Wars: The Force Awakens, the voice of Han Solo was passed on to Harrison Ford's regular Italian dub actor Michele Gammino.

== Filmography ==
=== Cinema ===
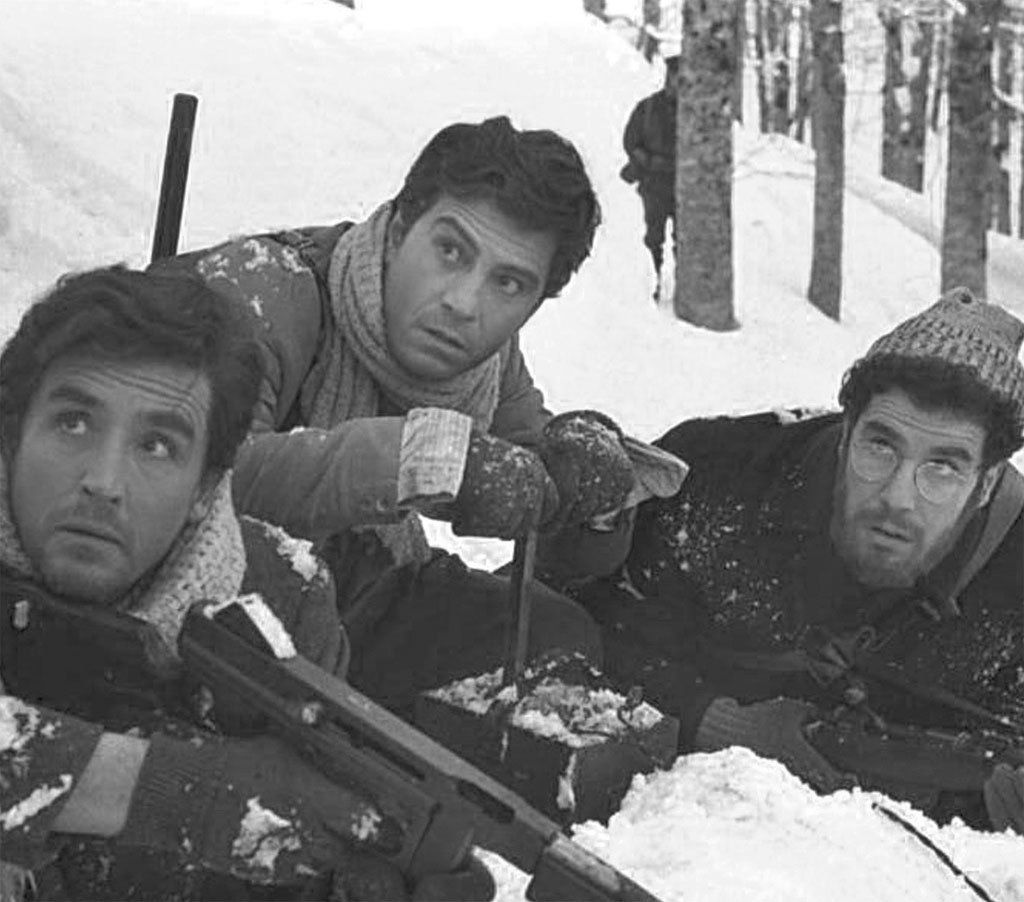
Satta Flores (right) with Vittorio Gassman and Nino Manfredi in We All Loved Each Other So Much (1974)

- Ginepro fatto uomo (1962)
- The Lizards (1963) - Francesco
- I mostri (1963)
- Gli arcangeli (1963)
- Questa volta parliamo di uomini (1965) - Don Fulgencio (segment "Un brav'uomo")
- The Birds, the Bees and the Italians (1966)
- The Girl with the Pistol (1968) - Waiter
- Io non scappo... fuggo (1970)
- Mafia Connection (1970) - Sicario
- Lady Caliph (1970) - Un operaio
- Four Flies on Grey Velvet (1971) - Andrea
- Il generale dorme in piedi (1972) - Ten. Sogliano
- The Funny Face of the Godfather (1972) - Jimmy Salvozzo
- Teresa the Thief (1973) - Ercoletto
- Il gioco della verità (1974)
- We All Loved Each Other So Much (1974) - Nicola Palumbo
- Paolo Barca, Schoolteacher and Weekend Nudist (1974) - Direttore
- How Wonderful to Die Assassinated (1975) - Carlo Pisacane
- Colpita da improvviso benessere (1976) - Gigino Mancuso
- Salon Kitty (1976) - Dino
- And Agnes Chose to Die (1976) - Il comandante
- Perdutamente tuo... mi firmo Macaluso Carmelo fu Giuseppe (1976) - Carmelo Macaluso
- A Spiral of Mist (1977) - Renato Marinoni
- I Am the Law (1977) - Magg. Spano
- Una donna di seconda mano (1977) - Sergio - il camionista
- L'arma (1978) - Luigi Compagna
- Who Is Killing the Great Chefs of Europe? (1978) - Fausto Zoppi
- Child of the Night (1978) - Andrea, le mari
- Corleone (1978) - Avvocato Natale Calia
- Tanto va la gatta al lardo... (1978) - Fan from Naples
- Ridendo e scherzando (1978) - Michele Sintona
- Riavanti... Marsch! (1979) - Alessio
- Hypochondriac (1979) - Orlando Mascarelli
- The Terrace (1980) - Tizzo
- One Hundred Days in Palermo (1984) - Captain Fontana (final film role)

== Dubbing roles ==
=== Live action ===
- Han Solo in Star Wars: Episode IV – A New Hope, Star Wars: Episode V – The Empire Strikes Back, Star Wars: Episode VI – Return of the Jedi
- Dallas in Alien
- George Webber in 10
- Tommy Lillard in The Frisco Kid
- H. G. Wells in Time After Time
- Tripper Harrison in Meatballs
- Hank Stamper in Sometimes a Great Notion
- Fred Mancuso in Lady Liberty
- Christopher Columbus in Christopher Columbus

== Bibliography ==
- Italian cinema and modern European literatures, 1945-2000 – Carlo Testa. Publisher: Greenwood Publishing Group Incorporated, 2000. Format: Hardcover, 288pp. Language: English. ISBN 978-0-275-97522-7
- The Motion Picture Guide 1986 Annual: The Films of 1985 – Jay Robert Nash, Stanley Ralph Ross. Publisher: CineBooks, 1987. Format: Hardcover, 450pp. Language: English. ISBN 0-933997-14-0
