= Patricia Black (actress) =

American actress

- Occupations: Actress and Creative Director of the Albright Fashion Library
- Years active: 1987, 2007-present

Patricia Black is an American actress living in New York, where she has studied acting since 2007. In 2013, she played a supporting role in Nadia Szold's debut film, Joy de V..

== Filmography ==
- Dead Aim (1987)
- Funland (1987)
- The Persian Love Cake (2009)
- A New York Fairy Tale (2011)
- Joy de V. (2013)
- The Last American Guido (2014)
- The Cocks of the Walk (2014)
- In Case of Emergency (2017)
- Pose (2019–2021)
- Virtue (2020)
- The Watcher (2022)
