= The Payoff (1978 film) =

- Theatrical release poster by Renato Casaro
- Directed by: Sergio Corbucci
- Written by: Attilio Veraldi; Dino Maiuri; Massimo De Rita; Luciano De Crescenzo; Elvio Porta
- Starring: Nino Manfredi; Ugo Tognazzi; Paolo Stoppa
- Cinematography: Luigi Kuveiller
- Edited by: Amedeo Salfa
- Music by: Pino Daniele
- Production company: Filmauro
- Distributed by: United Artists Europa
- Release date: 17 March 1978
- Running time: 110 minutes
- Country: Italy
- Language: Italian

The Payoff (Italian: La mazzetta) is an Italian crime comedy film directed in 1978 by Sergio Corbucci. It is based on the 1976 crime novel of the same name by the writer Attilio Veraldi.

== Cast ==
- Nino Manfredi as Sasà Jovine
- Ugo Tognazzi as Police Commissioner Assenza
- Paolo Stoppa as Don Michele Miletti
- Marisa Laurito as Luisella
- Imma Piro as Giulia Miletti
- Gennaro Di Napoli as Nicola Casali
- Marisa Merlini as Elena, Michele's first wife
- Sal Borgese as Tonino
- Giovanni Borgese as Pasquale
- Benito Stefanelli as Improta
- Giacomo Furia as Antonio
- Nino Vingelli as Catelli
- Lilly Furia as Miss Catelli
- Pietro De Vico as the car parking-xaretaker

== Production ==
Following the success of the crime novel La mazzetta, which sold over 55,000 copies in a few months, Luigi and Aurelio De Laurentiis acquired its rights and brought Sergio Corbucci on to direct it. The first screenplay, written by Dino Maiuri and Massimo De Rita, was considered unsuitable by Corbucci for being too hard-boiled and lacking credibility; Luciano De Crescenzo and Elvio Porta were then brought in and, working with Manfredi, reworked the screenplay with a stronger focus on its Neapolitan setting.

== Reception ==
Released in March 1978, the film was a massive success, grossing 4,2 billion lire at the Italian box office.

== Sequel ==
Following the commercial success of the film, it was planned an adaptation from the Veraldi's second novel based on the character of Sasà Jovine, L'uomo di conseguenza (1978), still directed by Sergio Corbucci and starring Marcello Mastroianni in the role of Jovine. After a series of meetings Mastroianni declined: he was not enthusiast to resume a character already successfully performed by Nino Manfredi, and the plot of the sequel involved incest, a scabrous subject he had treated the same year in the movie Stay As You Are. The production then decided to make him play a story with a tone more similar to The Payoff but not based on any novel, Neapolitan Mystery.
