= Élisabeth - Ils sont tous nos enfants =

Élisabeth - Ils sont tous nos enfants is a 2000 French film made for television, directed by Pasquale Squitieri. It stars Claudia Cardinale, Jean-Claude Brialy and Marion Corrales.
