= L'arma =

1978 film

- Directed by: Pasquale Squitieri
- Starring: Claudia Cardinale
- Music by: Tullio De Piscopo
- Release date: 7 September 1978
- Running time: 83 minutes
- Country: Italy
- Language: Italian

L'arma (released in English as The Gun and on home video as Sniper) is a 1978 Italian film. It stars Claudia Cardinale and Stefano Satta Flores, and was directed by Pasquale Squitieri.

== Cast ==
- Stefano Satta Flores: Luigi
- Claudia Cardinale: Marta
- Benedetta Fantoli: Rossana
- Clara Colosimo: cantante
