= Blood Brothers (1974 film) =

- Directed by: Pasquale Squitieri
- Written by: Ugo Pirro; Pasquale Squitieri; Michele Prisco
- Produced by: Gianni Hecht Lucari
- Starring: Claudia Cardinale; Franco Nero; Fabio Testi
- Cinematography: Eugenio Bentivoglio
- Edited by: Mario Morra
- Music by: Franco Campanino; Gigi Campanino
- Distributed by: Titanus
- Release date: 1974
- Country: Italy
- Language: Italian

Blood Brothers (Italian: I guappi) is a 1974 Italian historical drama film with "poliziotteschi" and "noir" elements. This film marks the meeting between Claudia Cardinale and the director Pasquale Squitieri, who soon became her husband.

== Cast ==
- Claudia Cardinale as Lucia Esposito
- Franco Nero as Nicola Bellizzi
- Fabio Testi as Don Gaetano "Core 'e Fierro" Frungillo
- Lina Polito as Nannina Scognamiglio
- Raymond Pellegrin as Delegato Aiossa
- Rita Forzano as Luisella
- Rosalia Maggio as Amalia Scognamiglio
- Nino Vingelli as Luigi Scarpetta
- Sonia Viviani as Donna Maria
- Salvatore Billa as Don Carluccio aka 'Trepalle'
