= I Am the Law (1977 film) =

- Italian film poster
- Directed by: Pasquale Squitieri
- Screenplay by: Pasquale Squitieri; Arrigo Petacco
- Story by: Ugo Pirro; Arrigo Petacco
- Based on: Il prefetto di ferro by Arrigo Petacco
- Produced by: Gianni Hecht Lucari
- Starring: Giuliano Gemma; Claudia Cardinale; Stefano Satta Flores; Massimo Mollica; Rossella Rusconi; Rik Battaglia; Enzo Fisichella; Lina Sastri; Francisco Rabal
- Cinematography: Silvano Ippoliti
- Edited by: Ruggero Mastroianni
- Music by: Ennio Morricone
- Production company: Rizzoli Film
- Distributed by: Cineriz
- Release date: 1977
- Running time: 118 minutes
- Country: Italy
- Language: Italian

I Am the Law (Italian: Il prefetto di ferro), also known as The Iron Prefect, is a 1977 Italian drama film directed by Pasquale Squitieri. The film tells the story of Cesare Mori, an Italian prefect that before and during the Fascist period was best known as "the Iron Prefect", and it is based on the biographic book with the same name written by Arrigo Petacco. The film shared with In the Name of the Pope King the 1978 David di Donatello for Best Film. The film was well-received but also criticized for subtly downplaying Mori's fascism.

== Plot ==
In 1925, Prefect Cesare Mori is sent by Mussolini to Palermo with special powers to fight the Mafia. Mori is not a Fascist, having fought against the ras Arpinati in the early twenties. Aided by police officer Francesco Spanò, he visits the house of mafia boss Antonio Capecelatro, and shoots him dead with a headshot on his balcony. He later organizes the siege of the town of Gangi, which culminates with the arrest and suicide of Don Calogero Albanese, fugitive for more than 40 years. The Prefect continues, undaunted in his work, frightening the Mafiosi who are trying to kill him.

Through the will left by an old man living in the poorhouse, he becomes acquainted with the lawyer Galli, chief hierarch of the Sicilian Fascists and the Minister of the Interior. Mori is appointed as a senator and leaves for Rome.

== Cast ==
- Giuliano Gemma: Cesare Mori
- Claudia Cardinale: Anna Torrisi
- Stefano Satta Flores: Spanò
- Francisco Rabal: Albanese the bandit
- Lina Sastri: Woman of Gangi
- Massimo Mollica: Paterno
- Rik Battaglia: Antonio Capecelatro
- Paul Müller
- Vittorio Duse
- Enzo Fiermonte

== Releases ==
Wild East released this on a limited edition R0 NTSC DVD under its English title "I Am the Law" alongside The Day of the Owl, under the title "Mafia", in 2010.

The film was released on Blu-ray under the English title The Iron Prefect by UK distributor Radiance in July 2023.
