= A Rose for Everyone =

1967 film

- Directed by: Franco Rossi
- Written by: Eduardo Borrás; Ennio De Concini; Nino Manfredi; Franco Rossi
- Starring: Claudia Cardinale; Nino Manfredi; Mario Adorf
- Cinematography: Alfio Contini
- Edited by: Giorgio Serrallonga
- Music by: Luis Bacalov
- Release date: 18 January 1967
- Country: Italy
- Language: Italian

A Rose for Everyone (Italian: Una rosa per tutti) is a 1967 Italian film. It stars Claudia Cardinale.

== Cast ==
- Claudia Cardinale as Rosa
- Nino Manfredi as The doctor
- Mario Adorf as Paolo
- Lando Buzzanca as Lino
- Akim Tamiroff as Basilio
- Milton Rodrígues as Sergio
- Célia Biar as Nilse
- José Lewgoy as Floreal
- Grande Otelo

== Production ==
The film was shot in Rio de Janeiro. Principal cinematography started on August 1965.

== Release ==
The film's release was delayed by issues with the Italian censors, who initially restricted it to viewers aged 18 and over; it was eventually released on 18 January 1967, grossing 421 million lire at the Italian box office.
