= Time of Indifference =

1964 Italian film

- Directed by: Francesco Maselli
- Written by: Suso Cecchi d'Amico; Francesco Masell
- Produced by: Franco Cristaldi
- Starring: Claudia Cardinale; Rod Steiger; Shelley Winters; Tomas Milian; Paulette Goddard
- Cinematography: Gianni Di Venanzo
- Edited by: Ruggero Mastroianni
- Music by: Giovanni Fusco
- Production companies: Lux Film; Ultra Film; Vides Cinematografica; Lux Compagnie Cinématographique de France
- Distributed by: Interfilm
- Release date: 1964 (Italy)
- Running time: 90 minutes
- Countries: Italy; France
- Language: Italian
- Budget: 751 million lire

Time of Indifference (Italian: Gli indifferenti, lit. 'The indifferent ones') is a 1964 Italian–French drama film directed by Francesco Maselli starring Claudia Cardinale. It is based on the novel Gli indifferenti by Alberto Moravia.

== Plot ==
Aging countess Maria Grazia Ardengo and her children Carla and Michele live in a luxurious villa in Rome. Due to the family's bankruptcy, their house has been mortgaged, now owned by unscrupulous businessman Leo, and the furnishings are subject to forced sales. Without the countess' knowledge, her long-time lover Leo has started an affair with her daughter Carla. Both Leo and Carla act out of mere calculation: Leo wants to adorn himself with a young, attractive wife and the Ardengo name, Carla wants to maintain her lifestyle. Michele, intent on killing Leo when he learns of the affair but unable to do so, tries to talk his sister into leaving the house with him and start a life on their own, but eventually both resign to the new conditions.

== Cast ==
- Claudia Cardinale as Carla Ardengo
- Rod Steiger as Leo Merumeci
- Shelley Winters as Lisa
- Tomas Milian as Michele Ardengo
- Paulette Goddard as Maria Grazia Ardengo

== Reception ==
In its 1965 review, Catholic film magazine Segnalazioni cinematografiche saw strengths on the film's formal side, particularly the acting and cinematography, but deficiencies in the psychology of the characters. Critic A. H. Weiler of The New York Times dismissed Time of Indifference upon its 1966 opening in New York, stating, "it takes itself so seriously and is so bad".

Judging Time of Indifference from a filmhistorical perspective, opinions were still divergent. In his 2009 book The A to Z of Italian Cinema, Gino Molterno called Maselli's film a "finely crafted" and "beautifully photographed" adaptation of Moravia's novel, while Luca Barattoni, in his 2012 Italian Post-Neorealist Cinema, came to a negative conclusion, titling the film "a stiff and vapid photostory, devoid of historical specificity".

== Awards ==
- 1964 Nastro d'Argento for Best Production Design
