= Claretta =

- Theatrical release poster
- Directed by: Pasquale Squitieri
- Starring: Claudia Cardinale
- Music by: Gerard Schurmann
- Release date: 1984
- Country: Italy
- Language: Italian

Claretta (English: Claretta Petacci) is a 1984 Italian historical drama film directed and written by Pasquale Squitieri.

The film entered the competition at the 41st edition of the Venice Film Festival. For her role of Claretta Petacci, Claudia Cardinale was awarded with a Nastro d'Argento for Best Actress.

== Cast ==
- Claudia Cardinale as Claretta Petacci
- Giuliano Gemma as Marcello Petacci
- Catherine Spaak as Roberta
- Philippe Lemaire as Severio Petacci
- Caterina Boratto as Giuseppina Petacci
- Fernando Briamo as Benito Mussolini
- Nancy Brilli as Miriam Petacci
- Angela Goodwin as Luisa
- María Mercader as Princess of Montenevoso
