= A Girl in Australia =

1971 film

A Girl in Australia (Bello, onesto emigrato Australia sposerebbe compaesana illibata)
- Film poster
- Directed by: Luigi Zampa
- Written by: Rodolfo Sonego; Luigi Zampa
- Based on: story by Rodolfo Sonego
- Produced by: Gianni Hecht Lucari; Fausto Saraceni
- Starring: Alberto Sordi
- Cinematography: Aldo Tonti
- Edited by: Mario Morra
- Music by: Piero Piccioni
- Production company: Documento Film
- Distributed by: Columbia Pictures (Australia)
- Release date: December 1971
- Running time: 107 minutes
- Country: Italy
- Languages: Italian; English

A Girl in Australia (Italian: Bello onesto emigrato Australia sposerebbe compaesana illibata [Handsome honest emigrant in Australia would marry chaste fellow-countrywoman]) is a 1971 Italian comedy film directed by Luigi Zampa, with stars Alberto Sordi and Claudia Cardinale.

== Plot ==
At the end of World War II, the promise of jobs and a chance to start a new life induced tens of thousands of young Italians to join the post-war immigration to Australia. In 1971, having lived about twenty-five years Down Under, one of those immigrants, middle-aged Amedeo Battipaglia, a lineman in the remote New South Wales settlement bearing the (fictional) name of Bun Bun Ga, several kilometers from the outback city of Broken Hill, is about to meet Carmela, his prospective bride from Rome, with whom he has been corresponding. Each of them misrepresented facts to the other — Carmela, a very attractive Calabrian woman in her early thirties, is a semiliterate prostitute seeking an opportunity to get away from her abusive pimp, with the letters to Amedeo ghostwritten by her friend Rosalba, while Amedeo, feeling inadequate about his ordinary appearance, sent Carmela a photograph, taken about ten years earlier, of himself between two Italian immigrant friends, Giuseppe Bartoni and Bampo. The arrow in the photo, however, is over Giuseppe because, when Amedeo visited his tall, handsome friend for advice, Giuseppe erased the arrow over Amedeo's head and pencilled it over his own head.

In Rome, getting a ride to the airport on the back of a friend's motorcycle, with her pimp in pursuit, Carmela arrives at the boarding gate, meets Rosalba who hands her the travel documents, has a final across-the-gate shouting match with her pimp, and takes a seat in Qantas first class next to a turbaned passenger perusing Life (issue of 19 February 1971). A stewardess points out that her ticket is for tourist class with special discount for immigrants. Meanwhile, Amedeo drives his substandard auto nearly 1600 kilometers to Brisbane Airport, where Carmela's flight, filled with other Italian mail-order brides (as well as those from neighboring Yugoslavia) will land. Sitting at the airport lounge with numerous Italian men awaiting their future wives, they pass around outdated photographs that the women had sent to their prospective mates and speculate whether their appearances had changed. Still uncertain of recognizing Carmela from the black-and-white photo of her as a young peasant girl, he examines and questions a few of the newly arrived women and then is hit with realization as she slowly comes into view on the down escalator. Becoming disconcerted by her beauty, he retreats to the airport's bar where, sharing a drink with a balding Italian who sent a photo of himself with a full head of hair, he expresses his own self-doubts. Convinced that she will reject him, he returns to the arrivals area, introduces himself as Giuseppe and hands her a note, purportedly written by Amedeo, explaining that he is ill with the flu and requesting that Giuseppe, a trusted friend, provide an escort to her new home.

Unsure how to confess the truth, Amedeo tells Carmela that driving from Brisbane to Giuseppe's home in Broken Hill takes three days, then detours north to Cairns in Queensland and travels down the eastern coast, stopping at Dunk Island on the Great Barrier Reef. There they rent a rowboat, and Carmela strips to her underwear to swim over the reef while Amedeo watches anxiously from the boat. As the drive toward Broken Hill continues, Carmela hears about his hard years as a migrant and sees him suffer a convulsion from an old bout of malaria that leaves him incapacitated for hours. Further along, they stop at a nursing home to visit Bampo, whom malarial brain damage has left unresponsive.

As Amedeo's small auto, unable to withstand the long journey, breaks down, they push and pull into a town and try to sell it in an Italian-speaking neighborhood, but run into some hostile local Italians who force Carmela into their car and drive away with her while Amedeo hangs on to their door handle, as the car veers off into a ditch and flips on its side. Shaken but unhurt, they go off to board a train, but when he has another malarial attack during a station stop and she rushes off the train to get help, it pulls out, leaving her behind. Seeing no other recourse, she decides to briefly take up her former profession in order to earn enough for continuing the journey. Now on her own, she takes a later train and, as it stops at the small town of Menindee, she sees Amedeo waiting at the station. Reunited, they continue to Broken Hill, which is a little over a hundred kilometers further. Upon arrival, Carmela meets Giuseppe, whom Amedeo, still pretending to be Giuseppe, introduces as her betrothed, Amedeo. After a few pleasantries, Giuseppe who, as it turns out, is himself a pimp, leaves after driving Carmela to the back entrance of what he describes as her new apartment, but which quickly reveals itself as a prostitute's walk-up house situated in the city's red light district amidst numerous other such dwellings, each with its own resident "working girl" sitting on the porch. Amedeo finds out where Giuseppe has taken Carmela, goes to the red light neighborhood and approaches her porch, hoping to offer an explanation, but she goes inside to get her switchblade and attacks him, inflicting a stab wound in his shoulder.

Eventually, Carmela and Amedeo, with his arm in a sling, are on a train, as he is still trying to convince her of his honorable intentions by offering to pay for her trip back to Italy but she begins to cry that she was a prostitute there and, upon returning, would be beaten by her pimp. Dismayed and outraged, he jumps up and exclaims (in Italian) to all the passengers that she has cheated and deceived him, but when she tells him that he was equally untruthful, he says that he forgives her and she slaps him, retorting that no one needs his forgiveness. At this point, the train is slowing to a stop and, upon spotting from the window the remoteness of the outback, she refuses to disembark at the tiny Bun Bun Ga railway shack "in the middle of the desert". As she is cajoled and then forcibly pulled off the train by Amedeo and two of his Italian friends who regularly travel this route, the spectacle is witnessed, several meters further, by the group of local English-speaking residents, brandishing a "WELCOME CARMELA" sign, who had come to meet the train. As Amedeo and Carmela approach, a little girl among the greeters slips a 45" record into a portable player which starts to emit Wagner's "Bridal Chorus", while one of the men takes out a sheet of paper and reads a speech, which Amedeo interprets for Carmela into Italian: "Dear Carmela, this is a historical day for Bun Bun Ga. Carmela, you come from the noble and ancient country that is Italy. The country of Julius Caesar, the country of Michelangelo, of Galileo, the country of Guglielmo Marconi, the country of Caruso, of Bartali, and Pope Giovanni. Carmela, you come to this corner of the desert to bring us a little breath of your old civilisation." As the train leaves the station, Amedeo can be seen through one of its windows carrying Carmela bridegroom-style into his/their house.

== Cast ==
- Alberto Sordi as Amedeo Battipaglia
- Claudia Cardinale as Carmela
- Riccardo Garrone as Giuseppe Bartoni
- Corrado Olmi as don Anselmo, Italian priest in Broken Hill
- Angelo Infanti as Carmela's pimp in Rome
- Tano Cimarosa as Amedeo's Italian Australian friend who helps him to pull Carmela off the train
- Marisa Carisi as Rosalba, who is waiting at the airport to give Carmela her travel documents
- John Cobley
- Elli Maclure
- John Guarino
- Silvana D'lapico
- Joe Sofia
- Tony Thurban
- Betty Lucas as passenger on the train as Amedeo and Carmela ride to Bun Bun Ga
- Nick Buttaro
- Fred Cullen
- Noel Ferrier as resident of Bun Bun Ga who reads the speech welcoming Carmela
- Paul Kamsler
- Alex Ciabo
- Frank Martorella
- Giovanni Portale
- Roger Cox
- Luigi Antonio Guerra as motorcyclist delivering Carmela to Rome airport

== Production ==
The film was shot in Australia in February and March 1971 and recorded in Italy. Filming took place around Cairns.

It was inspired by a trip to Australia taken by writer Rodolfo Sonego to visit his sister who had moved to Australia. The film at one stage was known as The Flying Fox. The story has similarites with They Knew What They Wanted.

== Reception ==
Filmink called it "a bright, sweet tale".

== Awards ==
- Claudia Cardinale won as 1972 "Best Actress" at the David di Donatello Awards.
