= 10-07: L'affaire Zeus =

French Canadian television series

10-07: L'affaire Zeus is a 1995 French Canadian TV police drama series. Four 45 minute episodes were produced.

== Cast ==
- Gildor Roy as Phil Nadeau
- Patrick Labbé as Tom Saint-Mars
- Chantal Fontaine as Claudia D'Annunzio
- Michel Barrette as Delvecchio
- Yves Soutière as Réjean Turcotte
- Gilbert Sicotte as Martineau
- Marcel Leboeuf as Marcel Lussier
- Germain Houde as Jean Beauregard
- Bobby Beshro as Bisaillon
- Michel Albert as Albert
- Claudia Cardinale as Agent
- Michel Monty as René Dionne
- Heikki Salomaa as Ile
- Catherine Sénart as Jeanne Morin
- Pierre Chagnon as Karl Bisonnette
