= Gianni Hecht Lucari =

Gianni Hecht Lucari (5 September 1922, in Wien – 27 August 1998, in Roma) was an Italian film producer, and production manager. Lucari was born in Vienna, Austria of Austrian, Jewish, and French ancestry. He died in Rome, Italy at the age of 76. Lucari produced many films from 1954 to 1980.

During World War II he served with the British Army as an Italian Intelligence liaison officer. After the war, in 1950, he started a film studio, Documento Films, which produced featurettes, documentaries and television programs. In 1953 he produced his first feature film Un giorno in pretura a four case courtroom drama and starring Sophia Loren in one of them.

== Selected filmography ==
- A Day in Court (1954)
- Our Husbands (1966)
- A Girl in Australia (1971)
- Blood Brothers (1974)

== See also ==
- Cinema of Italy
- Italian neorealism
- Commedia all'italiana
- Sword and sandal
