= Woman of Wonders =

1985 Italian film directed by Alberto Bevilacqua

- Directed by: Alberto Bevilacqua
- Written by: Alberto Bevilacqua
- Starring: Claudia Cardinale; Ben Gazzara
- Cinematography: Giuseppe Ruzzolini
- Edited by: Sergio Montanari
- Music by: Carlo Rustichelli; Paolo Rustichelli
- Release date: 1985
- Running time: 106 minutes
- Country: Italy
- Language: Italian

Woman of Wonders (Italian: La donna delle meraviglie) is a 1985 Italian film directed by Alberto Bevilacqua and based on a novel with the same name by him.

It entered the competition at the 1985 Venice International Film Festival.

== Cast ==
- Ben Gazzara as Alberto
- Lina Sastri as Luisa
- Claudia Cardinale as Maura
- Orazio Orlando as Ulisse
- Flavio Bucci as Astolfo
- Fabrizio Bentivoglio as Gianni
- Angela Goodwin as Maga Terenzi
- Carlo Monni as Maronti
- Giovanna Galletti
- Guido Mannari
- Jole Fierro
