= Attilio Veraldi =

Italian writer and translator (1925–1999)

- Born: 1925; Naples, Italy
- Died: 1999 (aged 73–74); Monte Carlo, Monaco
- Occupation: Writer

Attilio Veraldi (1925–1999) was an Italian novelist and translator.

== Biography ==
Born in Naples, Veraldi started his career as a translator of hardboiled American novels. He made his writing debut in 1976, with the giallo novel La mazzetta, which enjoyed an immediate critical and commercial and was later adapted into a film, The Payoff. He is regarded as an original innovator in the giallo genre, being noted for his ironic approach as well as for his realistic portrays of the Neapolitan Camorra underworld and terrorist circles, and as the inspirator of a wave of Neapolitan giallo novelists.

== Novels ==
- La mazzetta (1976)
- Uomo di conseguenza (1978)
- Il vomerese (1980)
- Naso di cane (1982)
- L'amica degli amici (1984)
- Donna da Quirinale (1990)
- Scicco (1991)
- L'ombra dell'avventura (1992)
