= Marcello: A Sweet Life =

- Directed by: Annarosa Morri; Mario Canale
- Release date: 2006
- Running time: 98 minutes
- Country: Italy
- Language: Italian

Marcello: A Sweet Life is a 2006 Italian documentary film about actor Marcello Mastroianni.
