= Goha =

- Directed by: Jacques Baratier
- Written by: Albert Adès; Georges Schehadé
- Starring: Omar Sharif
- Cinematography: Jean Bourgoin
- Edited by: Léonide Azar
- Release date: May 1958
- Running time: 83 minutes
- Country: France
- Language: French

Goha is a 1958 French-Tunisian film. It starred Omar Sharif and it was the cinema debut of Claudia Cardinale in a small role. At the 1958 Cannes Film Festival it was awarded with the Jury Prize and it had been nominated for the Palme d'Or. It was shown as part of the Cannes Classics section of the 2013 Cannes Film Festival.

== Cast ==
- Omar Sharif - Goha (as Omar Chérif)
- Zohra Faiza - Farrideh (as Zohra Faïza)
- Lauro Gazzolo - Taj-el-Ouloum
- Gabriel Jabbour - Sayed Khamis
- Daniel Emilfork - Ibrahim
- Zina Bouzaiade - Fulia
- Claudia Cardinale - Amina
- Ito Ben Lahsen - Chams
- Jean Laugier - L'écrivain public
- Annie Legrand - Loulou
