= Cherche fiancé tous frais payés =

- Directed by: Aline Issermann
- Written by: Jean-Luc Estèbe; Aline Issermann; Brice-Pascal Renault
- Produced by: Laurent & Michèle Pétin
- Starring: Alexandra Lamy; Bruno Salomone; Claudia Cardinale
- Cinematography: Thierry Arbogast
- Edited by: Judith Rivière Kawa
- Music by: Minino Garay
- Distributed by: ARP Sélection
- Release date: 27 June 2007
- Running time: 92 minutes
- Country: France
- Language: French
- Budget: $3.4 million
- Box office: $2.7 million

Cherche fiancé tous frais payés (lit. 'Seeking fiancé all expenses paid') is a 2007 French film directed by Aline Issermann.

== Cast ==
- Alexandra Lamy : Alexandra
- Bruno Salomone : Yann / Manuel
- Claudia Cardinale : Elisabeth
- Isabelle Gélinas : Marie
- Gilles Gaston-Dreyfus : Bernard
- Mathias Mlekuz : Christian
- Rachida Khalil : Vanessa
- Mélissa Verstraeten : Eglantine
- Zélie Jobert : Marion
- Blandine Bellavoir : Paloma
- Christian Brendel : François
- Jean-Claude Adelin : Gérard
- Jacques Zabor : The director
- Jean Dujardin : The nightclub animator
