= Claudia Cardinale =

Italian-Tunisian actress (1938–2025)

Claudia Cardinale OMRI L.d'H.
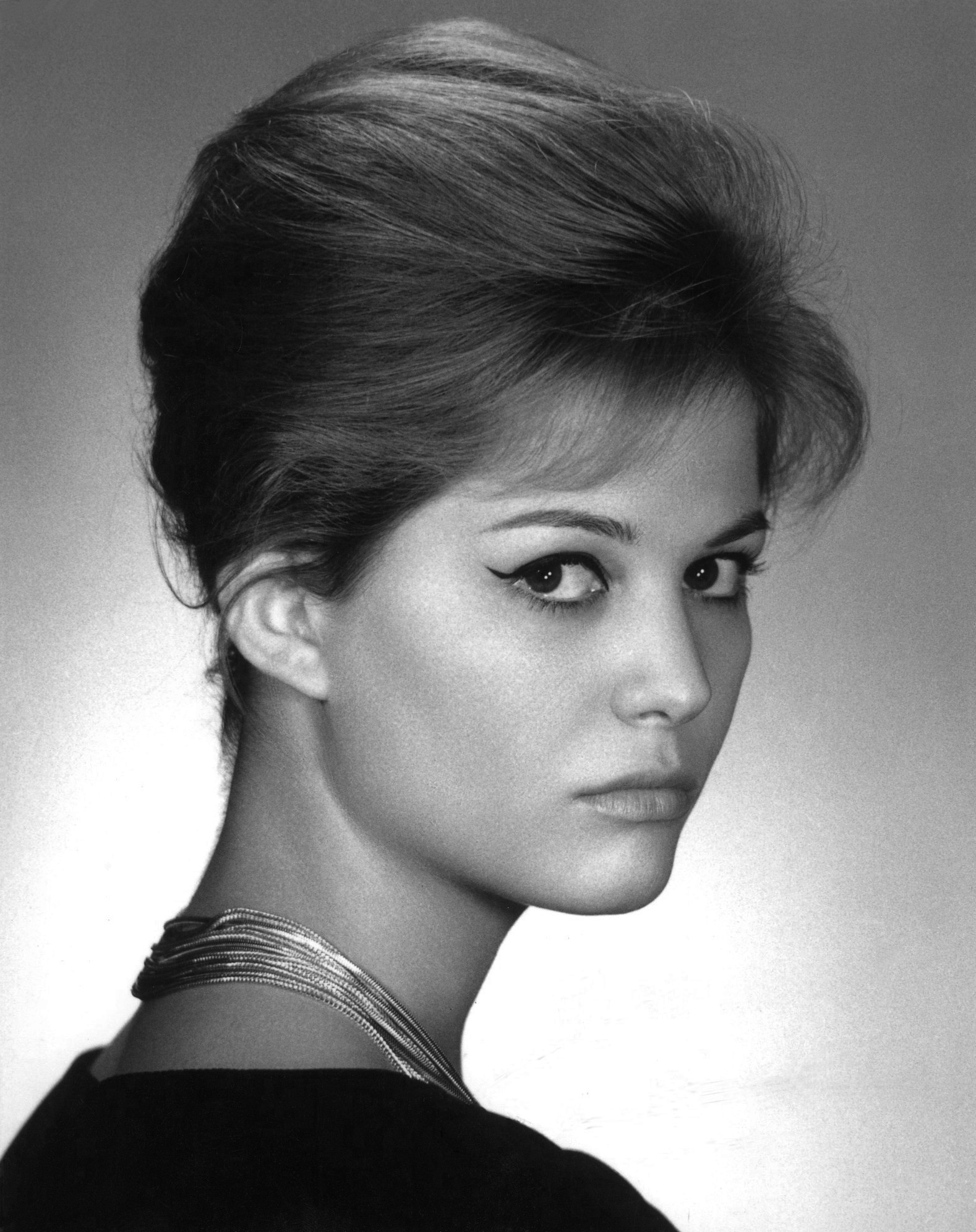
- Cardinale in 1960
- Born: Claude Joséphine Rose Cardinale; 15 April 1938; La Goulette, French Tunisia
- Died: 23 September 2025 (aged 87); Nemours, France
- Citizenship: Italy
- Occupation: Actress
- Years active: 1957–2022
- Works: Filmography
- Spouse: Franco Cristaldi (m. 1966–1975)
- Partner: Pasquale Squitieri (1975–2017; his death)
- Children: 2
- Relatives: Francesca Cardinale (niece)

Claude Joséphine Rose "Claudia" Cardinale (Italian: [ˈklaudja kardiˈnaːle]; 15 April 1938 – 23 September 2025) was an Italian-Tunisian actress. Regarded as one of the leading female figures of Italian cinema, alongside Sophia Loren, Monica Vitti, Silvana Mangano, Anna Magnani, and Gina Lollobrigida, she achieved international recognition during a career spanning more than six decades. Celebrated in the 1960s as "the most beautiful woman in the world" and widely considered a sex symbol of the era, Cardinale appeared in more than 175 films, primarily in Italy and France, across genres including comedy, drama, spaghetti westerns, and historical epics. She collaborated with acclaimed directors such as Federico Fellini, Sergio Leone, Luchino Visconti and Werner Herzog, and several of her films are regarded as significant works in the history of cinema. At the time of her death, she was one of the last surviving stars from the Golden Age of European cinema.

Cardinale was born and raised in La Goulette, a municipality in Tunisia near Tunis. She won the "Most Beautiful Italian Girl in Tunisia" competition in 1957, the prize being a trip to Italy. This move quickly led to film contracts, due above all to the involvement of producer Franco Cristaldi, who acted as her mentor for a number of years and later married her. After making her debut in a minor role with Egyptian star Omar Sharif in Goha (1958), Cardinale became one of the best-known actresses in Italy, with roles in films such as Rocco and His Brothers (1960), Girl with a Suitcase (1961), Cartouche (1962), The Leopard (1963) and Federico Fellini's 8½ (1963).

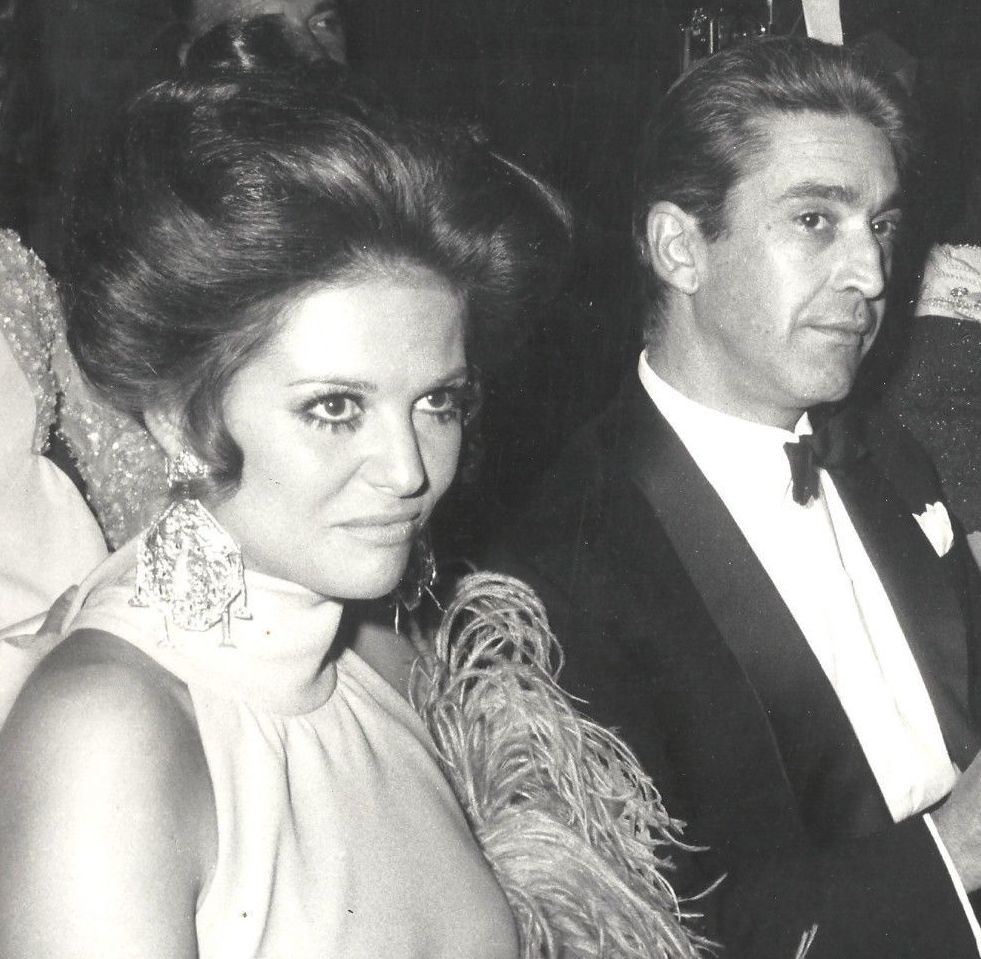
Claudia Cardinale with Franco Cristaldi in 1965

From 1963, Cardinale appeared in The Pink Panther opposite David Niven. She went on to appear in the Hollywood films Blindfold (1966), Lost Command (1966), The Professionals (1966), Don't Make Waves (1967) with Tony Curtis, The Hell with Heroes (1968), The Red Tent (1969), A Fine Pair (1968), The Salamander (1981), and the Sergio Leone Western Once Upon a Time in the West (1968), a joint U.S.–Italian production, in which she was praised for her role as a former prostitute opposite Jason Robards, Charles Bronson and Henry Fonda.

Jaded with Hollywood, and not wanting to become a cliché, Cardinale returned to Italian and French cinema and garnered the David di Donatello for Best Actress award for her roles in The Day of the Owl (1968) and as a prostitute alongside Alberto Sordi in A Girl in Australia (1971). In 1974, Cardinale met director Pasquale Squitieri, who would become her partner. She was frequently featured in his films, including Blood Brothers (1974), Father of the Godfathers (1978) and Claretta (1984), the last of which won her the Nastro d'Argento Award for Best Actress. In 1982, she co-starred with Klaus Kinski in Werner Herzog's Fitzcarraldo. In 2010, Cardinale received the Best Actress Award at the 47th Antalya "Golden Orange" International Film Festival for her performance as an elderly Italian woman who takes in a young Turkish exchange student in Signora Enrica.

Over the years, Cardinale was outspoken about women's rights and became a UNESCO goodwill ambassador for the Defence of Women's Rights beginning in March 2000. In February 2011, the Los Angeles Times Magazine named Cardinale among the 50 most beautiful women in film history.

== Early life ==
Cardinale was born in La Goulette, a port municipality near Tunis, on 15 April 1938. Tunisia was then under French control, as the Regency of Tunis. Her father, Francesco Cardinale, was an Italian railway worker of French-Piedmontese and Sardinian-Sicilian origins. Her mother, Yolande Greco, was born in the then Italian Tripolitania to Sardinian-Ligurian parents. They later settled in La Goulette, which had a large Italian community. She grew up speaking only French language and Tunisian Arabic, and did not learn Italian until she started being cast in Italian films.

Cardinale was educated at the Saint-Joseph-de-l'Apparition School of Carthage, which she attended along with her younger sister, Blanche. She then studied at the Paul Cambon School with the intention of becoming a teacher. As a teenager she was described as "silent, weird and wild" and like other young women of her generation was fascinated by Brigitte Bardot, who came to prominence in the 1956 film And God Created Woman, directed by Roger Vadim.

== Career ==
=== 1950s ===
Cardinale's first film work was participating, along with classmates, in a short film by French director René Vautier, Anneaux d'or, successfully presented at the Berlin Film Festival. The film made her a minor local celebrity and led to her being spotted by Jacques Baratier, who offered her a small role in Goha. She accepted it reluctantly after Baratier explained he wanted a Tunisian actress rather than an Italian to star in the main role opposite Egyptian actor Omar Sharif. The appearance nonetheless marked her feature-film debut. The turning point came in 1957 during the Italian Cinema Week in Tunis, when she won a competition for the "Most Beautiful Italian Girl in Tunisia", with a trip to the Venice Film Festival as first prize. After being spotted by several film producers at the event, she was invited to study at the Experimental Cinematography Centre in Rome under Tina Lattanzi. She attended briefly as, despite her extremely photogenic looks, she had trouble with her acting assignments (partly owing to her difficulties with the Italian language). She left at the end of her first term and decided to return home, earning herself a cover story in the popular weekly Epoca triggered by her unexpected decision to turn her back on a career as a film star. (Note: The beauty contest was meant to raise money for charity; Cardinale's mother was on the charity committee. She says she was pushed on stage by someone while she was helping with the arrangements and was declared the winner. At the time, Cardinale had her teacher's certificate and hoped to teach in a Tunisian desert town. Since Cardinale wanted to become a teacher, she was not interested in the many film contracts offered her during her visit to Venice. The offers followed her after her return to Tunisia.)

Back in Tunis, however, Cardinale discovered unexpectedly that she was pregnant, the result of what she later described as a "terrible" relationship with a Frenchman, some 10 years her senior, which began when she was only 17 and lasted for about a year. On this discovery he wanted her to have an abortion but she decided to keep the child. She solved her problems by signing a seven-year exclusive contract with Franco Cristaldi's production company Vides. (Note: Cristaldi offered Cardinale the contract without a screen test. The contract contained many stipulations to which Cardinale was expected to adhere while Cristaldi groomed her.) Cristaldi largely managed her early career and she was married to him from 1966 until 1975.

Under the new contract, in 1958 Cardinale was given a minor role with Italian actors Vittorio Gassman, Totò, Marcello Mastroianni and Renato Salvatori in Mario Monicelli's internationally successful criminal comedy Big Deal on Madonna Street (I soliti ignoti). She portrayed Carmelita, a Sicilian girl virtually imprisoned in her home by her overpowering brother. The comedy was a huge success, making Cardinale instantly recognisable. Some newspapers were already referring to her as "la fidanzata d'Italia" (Italy's sweetheart). Later that year she had a leading role alongside Yvonne Monlaur in Claudio Gora's romantic comedy Three Strangers in Rome.

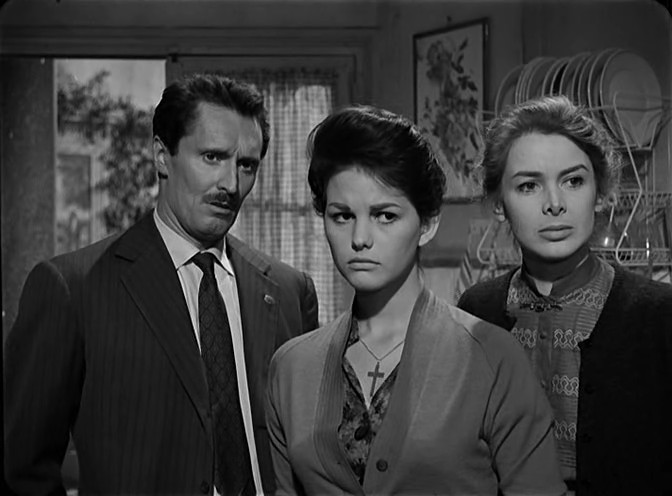
Cardinale in Pietro Germi's The Facts of Murder (1959)

Cardinale was able to work into her seventh month of pregnancy and kept it hidden from co-workers and the public.

Although Cardinale's pregnancy was kept a tight secret she was tormented by thoughts of suicide and fell into a state of depression. When she knew she could no longer hide her pregnancy or honor her contract with Cristaldi, she asked him to terminate the contract. Understanding her predicament, he sent her to London for the birth, far away from the press. He simply explained that she had gone to England to learn English for a film. Cristaldi told Cardinale not to reveal her condition, as she would be betraying the public and it would put an end to her career. So as to maintain the secret he drew up a detailed American-style contract covering every little detail of her life, depriving her of any possibility of acting on her own behalf. Cardinale explained: "I was no longer master of my own body or thoughts. Even talking with a friend about anything that could make me look different from my public image was risky, as if it had been publicized, I would have been in trouble. Everything was in the hands of Vides." For seven years Cardinale kept her secret, not only from the public but also from her own son, Patrick, who grew up in the family with her parents and sister more or less as a brother until the day Enzo Biagi, a journalist, discovered the truth. Eventually Cardinale decided to tell Biagi everything and he published her story in both Oggi and L'Europeo.

In 1959 she appeared opposite Renato Salvatori in the mafia film Vento del sud and played the wife of Maurizio Arena in Luigi Zampa's Il magistrato. Cardinale also starred opposite Pietro Germi in his crime film The Facts of Murder, an important assignment for her in mastering the craft of acting while learning to feel at ease in front of the camera. Cardinale considered it to have been her first real test as an actress. She then played the role of Maria in Ralph Thomas's British film Upstairs and Downstairs, which starred Michael Craig and Anne Heywood.

=== 1960s ===
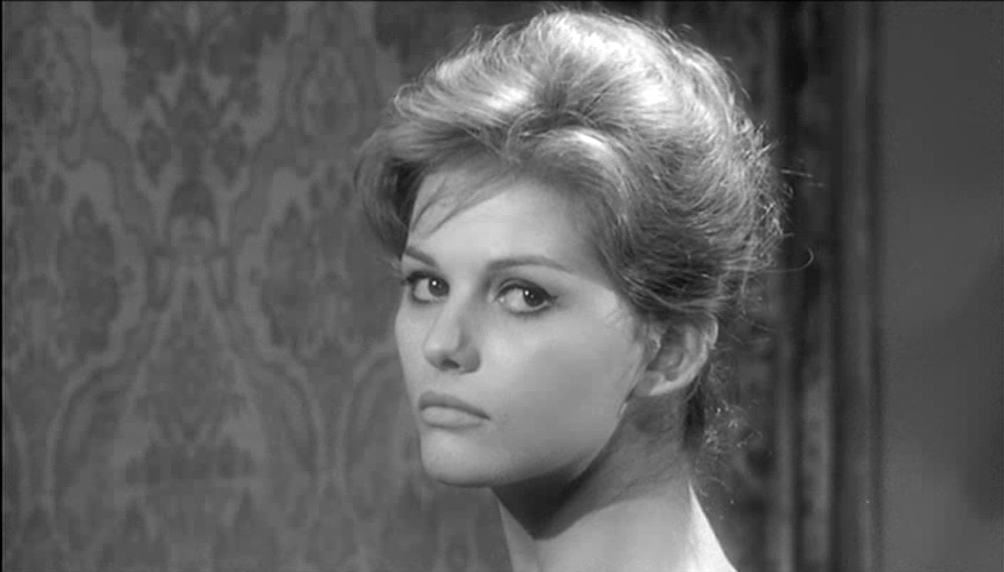
Cardinale in Il bell'Antonio (1960)

In 1960, Cardinale starred opposite Marcello Mastroianni in Mauro Bolognini's Golden Leopard-winning drama film Il bell'Antonio. The film marked the start of a fruitful partnership. Cardinale stated that her films with Bolognini were among the most joyful of her career, considering him to be "a great director, a man of rare professional capability, great taste and culture. Beyond that, for me personally, a sensitive and sincere friend." In Bolognini's films, thanks to her aesthetic femininity, Cardinale took roles of manipulative women who lead men to perdition. During the filming of Il bell'Antonio, her co-star Marcello Mastroianni fell in love with her, but she rejected him, as she did not take his love seriously, considering him to be one of those actors who cannot help but fall in love with their co-stars. Mastroianni insisted that his feelings were genuine, even after many years. The genuine empathy between the two actors proved to be ideal for reproducing the tension between the characters in the film. Cardinale next portrayed Pauline Bonaparte in Abel Gance's French film Austerlitz, and after appearing opposite Vittorio Gassman and Salvatori in the sequel to Big Deal on Madonna Street, Audace colpo dei soliti ignoti, she portrayed Ginetta, the fiancée of Spiros Focás, alongside Salvatori and Alain Delon in Luchino Visconti's critically acclaimed Rocco and His Brothers. However, her leading performance in Francesco Maselli's Silver Spoon Set gained her most attention during this period. Francesco Freda felt the film paved her way "to great success", noting the "sweetness of her smile" which struck a chord with the public. In her early Italian roles, Cardinale was usually dubbed, as producers considered her voice too hoarse and she still spoke Italian with an accent at that point.

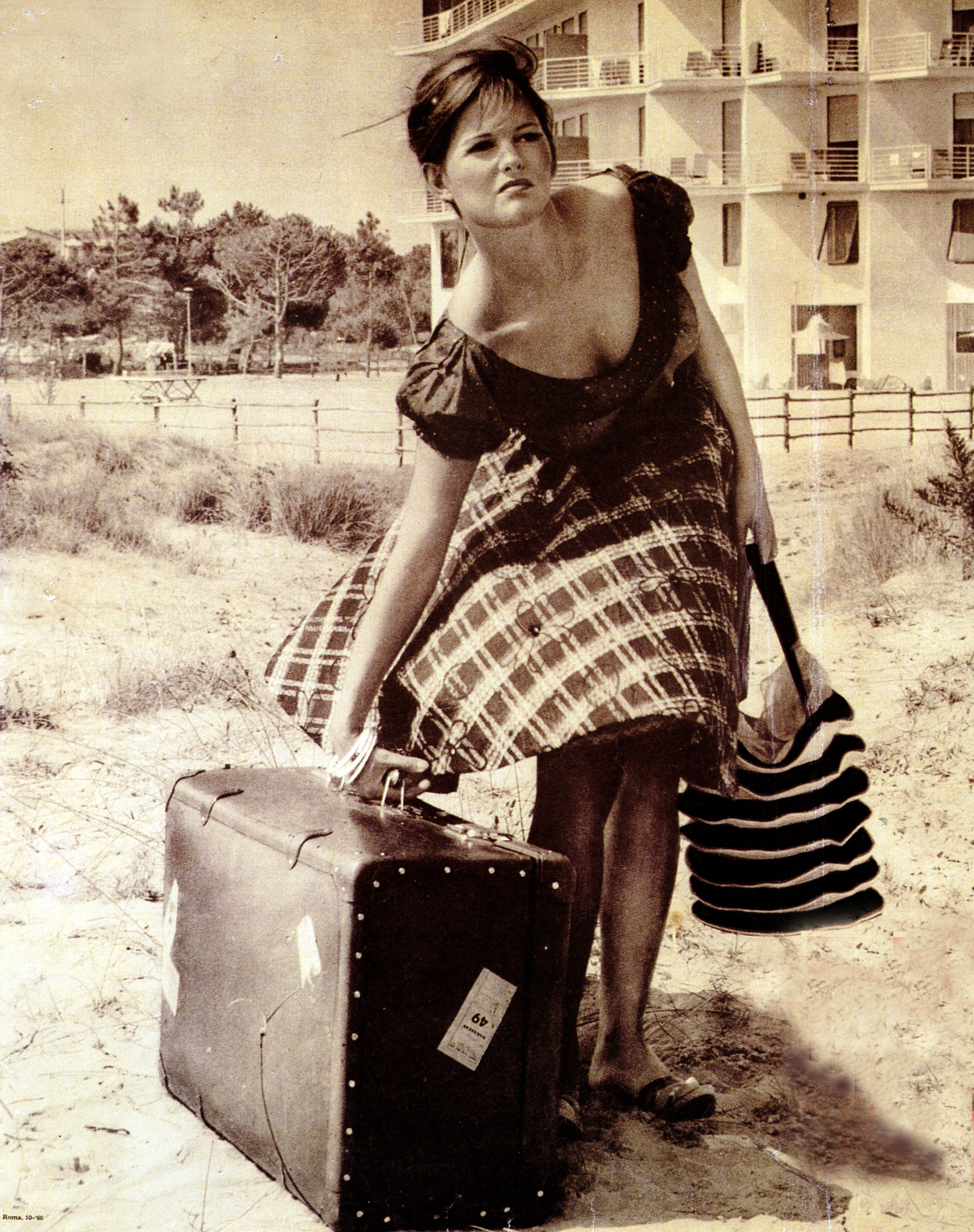
Cardinale in Valerio Zurlini's Girl with a Suitcase (1961)

In 1961, Cardinale portrayed a sultry nightclub singer and young mother in Valerio Zurlini's Girl with a Suitcase. As a result of her own experience of early motherhood, Cardinale naturally conveyed the concerns of a teenaged mother, identifying fully with the character of Aida. Such was her psychological involvement that she needed several months to overcome her apprehensions and prepare for the part. Zurlini chose her for such a difficult role against everyone's advice, as she was not yet considered a "real" actress, nor was she (yet) one of the most celebrated Italian beauties. He was very close and supportive of Cardinale during the production though and a true friendship developed between the two, based on a deep mutual understanding. Cardinale remarked: "Zurlini was one of those who really love women: he had an almost feminine sensitivity. He could understand me at a glance. He taught me everything, without ever making demands on me. ... He was really very fond of me." Cardinale was warmly praised by the critics for her performance in Girl with a Suitcase, Dennis Schwartz considering her to have been at her "charming best". Later in 1961, Cardinale starred as a prostitute opposite Jean-Paul Belmondo in Bolognini's The Lovemakers. Both Girl with a Suitcase and The Lovemakers were presented at the 1961 Cannes Film Festival. At the time, Cardinale was not considered comparable to the two divas of Italian cinema, Sophia Loren and Gina Lollobrigida, but several newspapers and magazines, including Paris Match, began to consider her to be a credible young rival to Brigitte Bardot. Cardinale's 1961 appearances also included Henri Verneuil's French comedy The Lions Are Loose and Auguste, in which she had a cameo role.

The following year, Cardinale starred opposite Jean-Paul Belmondo as Vénus in the 18th-century set adventure Cartouche, which made her a major star in France. She also played Angiolina, the romantic interest of Anthony Franciosa in Bolognini's Careless, a character which film writer Jacek Klinowski describes as "a spirited and strikingly beautiful 20-year-old". In 1962, Cardinale was interviewed by the writer Alberto Moravia, who focused exclusively on her sexuality and body image in films, treating her as an object. Cardinale remarked to him: "I used my body as a mask, as a representation of myself". The interview was published in Esquire under the title "The Next Goddess of Love". Cardinale was amused to discover that the interview had inspired the writer to publish La dea dell'amore ("Goddess of Love") the following year, in which one of the characters, with her fine physical appearance and natural curves, closely resembled Cardinale. Just a few years later, she played a similar character in a film based on another novel by Moravia, Time of Indifference.

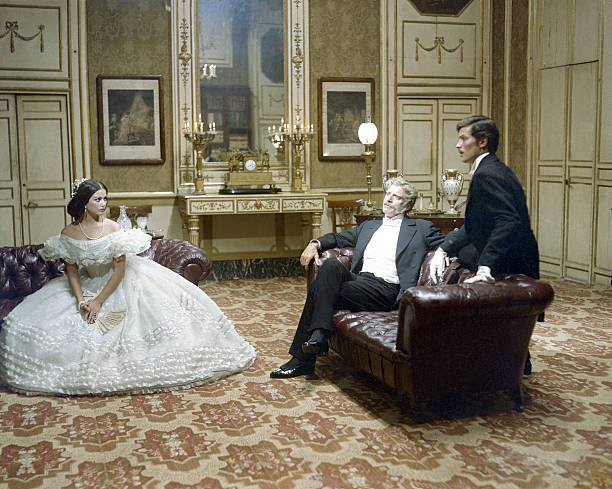
Cardinale with Burt Lancaster and Alain Delon in The Leopard (1963)

The finest and most prolific year of her career was 1963, when she appeared in a number of leading productions. She starred alongside Burt Lancaster in Visconti's The Leopard (1963) (Il Gattopardo), portraying a village girl who married a progressive young aristocrat (Alain Delon) and played a film actress cast by a director (Marcello Mastroianni) in Federico Fellini's 8½. She participated in the two films during exactly the same period, frequently moving from one to the other and experiencing the strictly planned approach of Visconti, which contrasted strongly with Fellini's much more relaxed style and his almost total reliance on improvisation. Cardinale remembered Visconti's set as having an almost religious atmosphere, everything focused on the film, far removed from the outside world. Visconti needed silence for his work, while Fellini preferred noise and confusion.

Prior to this period, Cardinale's own voice had not been used in her Italian films, as it was considered too hoarse and owing to her French accent, insufficiently Italian. Her voice was once described as "throaty, husky and dark", in part due to smoking two packets of cigarettes a day. Not until 8½ was she allowed to use her own voice. Cardinale explained: "When I arrived for my first movie, I couldn't speak a word. I thought I was on the moon. I couldn't understand what they were talking about. And I was speaking in French; in fact, I was dubbed. And Federico Fellini was the first one who used my voice. I think I had a very strange voice." With her portrayal of Angelica in The Leopard and her brief appearance as herself in 8½, Cardinale achieved the definitive status of a top-ranking star.

The same year, Cardinale starred as Mara in La ragazza di Bube or Bebo's Girl, in which she also used her own voice. For her performance in the film, she received her first Nastro d'Argento for Best Actress in 1965. Cardinale acted in her first American film (although it was produced in Italy) when she played Princess Dala, a wealthy aristocratic woman who is the love and jewellery interest of David Niven in the Cortina d'Ampezzo-set The Pink Panther. Cardinale's voice in the film was dubbed by Gale Garnett, who went uncredited. Niven raved about working with the actress, telling her, "After spaghetti, you're Italy's happiest invention."

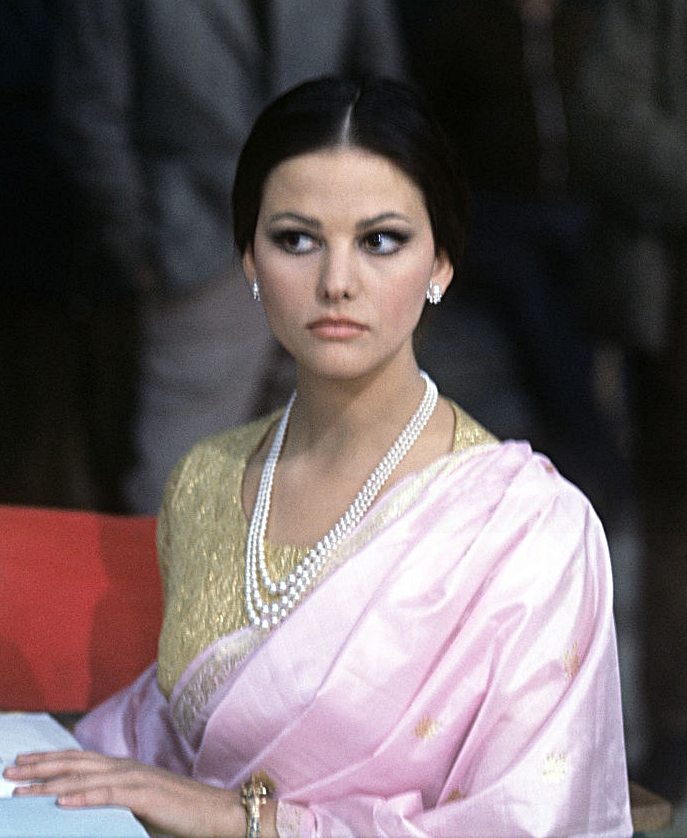
Cardinale during the filming of The Pink Panther (1963)

In 1964, Cardinale starred alongside Rod Steiger and Shelley Winters in Francesco Maselli's Italian-made Time of Indifference. Thereafter, she spent three years in the United States, where she starred in several Hollywood films. She told of how she benefited from the arrangement, explaining it was an American initiative at a time when they invited all the successful European actresses to perform in their pictures, hoping to create a monopoly. Many suffered from the experience, but she was able to hold her own: "I took care of my own interests, blankly refusing to sign an exclusive contract with Universal Studios. I only signed for individual films. In the end, everything worked out fine for me. She first starred in Henry Hathaway's Hollywood picture Circus World (1964) opposite John Wayne and Rita Hayworth, playing the daughter of Hayworth, who performs with her as a mother-daughter circus act. By the end of the decade, she had returned to making films primarily in Italy, accepting a pay cut, turning her back on Hollywood stardom. Cardinale further said, "I don't like the star system. I'm a normal person. I like to live in Europe. I mean, I've been going to Hollywood many, many times, but I didn't want to sign a contract." Film writer David Simpson notes that as a result, "Cardinale never achieved the same level of fame as Loren and Gina Lollobrigida", although she appeared in a higher number of decent films.

In 1964, she also played the lead role in The Magnificent Cuckold, based on the Belgian play Le Cocu magnifique. She was at the height of her sensuality at the time, but later the film only brought back unpleasant memories for her as she experienced little empathy with the director Antonio Pietrangeli, while the male star Ugo Tognazzi tried to seduce her. In 1965, Cardinale appeared in Visconti's Vaghe stelle dell'Orsa, known as Sandra (Of a Thousand Delights) in the U.S. and Of These Thousand Pleasures in the UK, playing a Holocaust survivor who may have had an incestuous relationship with her brother. Later that year, she starred opposite Rock Hudson in Universal Pictures's Blindfold, the last film to be directed by Philip Dunne. Filming began on 22 February 1965 on location in Ocala, Florida. Diane Bond doubled for Cardinale in the film. Cardinale became good friends with Hudson, who proved to be very protective of her, knowing her discomfort outside of Italy. While in Hollywood, Cardinale also became friends with Barbra Streisand, Elliott Gould, and Steve McQueen, but she never managed to feel at home there.

By 1966, Cardinale was being cited as the most popular film star in Italy, even more than Mastroianni and Loren. Life stated that "the Cardinale appeal is a blend of solid simplicity and radiant sensuality. It moves men all over the world to imagine her both as an exciting mistress and wife." However, following her success in Hollywood, she began to express concerns about the direction of her career. In a July 1966 interview with Life, she confessed her fear of being overglamourized and exploited, like Sophia Loren, and although she had several further U.S. films lined up, stated: "If I have to give up the money, I give it up. I do not want to become a cliché."

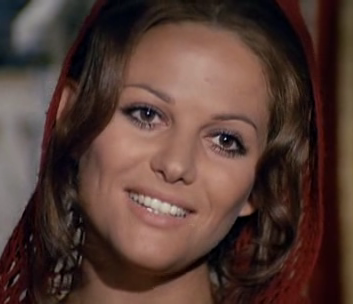
Cardinale in The Conspirators (1969)

In 1966, a photograph of Cardinale was featured in the original gatefold artwork to Bob Dylan's album Blonde on Blonde (1966), but it was used without her permission and removed from later pressings. That year, she starred in Mark Robson's war picture Lost Command for Columbia Pictures opposite Anthony Quinn, Alain Delon, and George Segal. Quinn expressed his love of working with Cardinale, stating that although he adored Cardinale and Loren equally, "I relate easier to Claudia; Sophia creates an impression of something larger than life, something unobtainable. But Claudia – she's not easy, still she's within reach". She also played a Mexican marquessa in Richard Brooks' Western The Professionals, uniting her on screen once again with Burt Lancaster in what she considered to be her best American film. The following year, she appeared in Una rosa per tutti (A Rose for Everyone) and in Alexander Mackendrick's sex farce Don't Make Waves opposite Tony Curtis and Sharon Tate. Although occasional funny moments were noted, Don't Make Waves was generally panned by the critics and the lack of chemistry with co-star Curtis was highlighted. Leonard Maltin, though, described the film as "a gem".

At the beginning of 1967, Cristaldi joined her in the United States. While the two were staying in Atlanta, he surprised her by taking her to their wedding ceremony, which he had arranged without her knowledge. She went ahead with the ceremony, but was concerned about sacrificing the rights she had to her child Patrick. She also realised she was increasingly unable to make decisions about her own life. The marriage was never made official in Italy.

In 1968, Cardinale featured opposite Franco Nero in The Day of the Owl, in a David di Donatello for Best Actress-winning performance. She reunited with Rock Hudson in the Italian-made criminal comedy A Fine Pair under director Francesco Maselli. She also appeared alongside Rod Taylor in The Hell with Heroes and starred in one of her best-known roles as former prostitute Jill McBain in Sergio Leone's epic Western Once Upon a Time in the West. Such was the power of her performance as the whore that Leone's biographer Robert C. Cumbow described her as "permanently engraved in cinematic history" and noted how suited to the role she was: "Her sex-goddess appearance combines with her more mystical iconographic associations to ease the progress of Jill from tart to town builder, from harlot to earth mother, from sinner to symbol of America—the apotheosis of the harlot with a heart of gold." In 1969, Cardinale starred opposite Nino Manfredi in Luigi Magni's The Conspirators, based on the actual story of the capital execution of two carbonari in papal Rome. This was followed by a role as a telephone operator in Diary of a Telephone Operator and as a nurse opposite Sean Connery and Peter Finch in Mikhail Kalatozov's The Red Tent, based on the story of the mission to rescue Umberto Nobile and the other survivors of the crash of the airship Italia.

=== 1970s ===
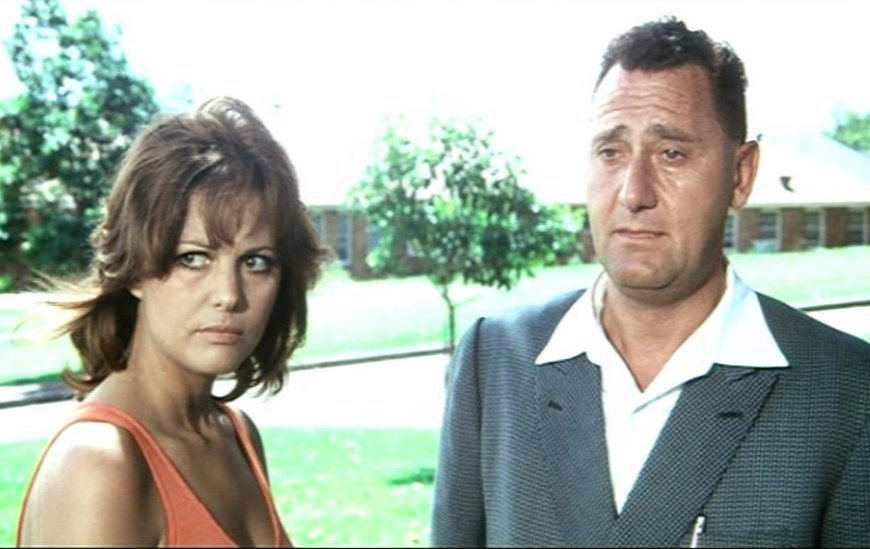
Cardinale with Alberto Sordi in A Girl in Australia (1971)

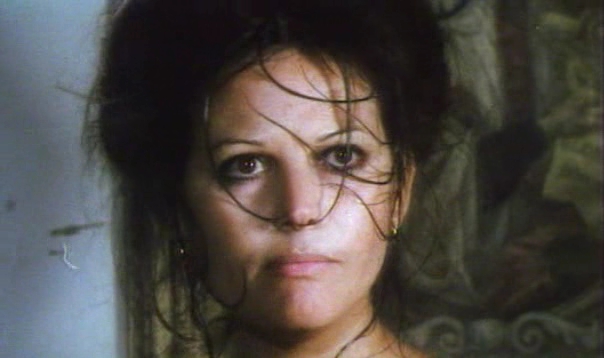
Cardinale in Blood Brothers (1974)

In 1970, Cardinale starred opposite Peter McEnery and Eli Wallach in Jerzy Skolimowski's comedy film The Adventures of Gerard, based on The Exploits of Brigadier Gerard by Arthur Conan Doyle. In 1971, she formed a duo with Brigitte Bardot in the French Western-comedy The Legend of Frenchie King (French: Les Pétroleuses) and appeared as a prostitute opposite Alberto Sordi in Luigi Zampa's comedy A Girl in Australia. The film, shot on location in February and March 1971, earned Cardinale a Best Actress award at the David di Donatello Awards the following year. In 1972, Cardinale appeared in Marco Ferreri's The Audience, which was screened at the 22nd Berlin International Film Festival. She also featured in La Scoumoune with Jean-Paul Belmondo and Michel Constantin. After a role as a Russian aristocrat opposite Oliver Reed in One Russian Summer (1973), set in prerevolutionary Russia, Cardinale starred opposite Franco Nero in Blood Brothers (1974), a historical drama film with "poliziotteschi" and "noir" elements. Cardinale and the director Pasquale Squitieri met for the first time on set and he soon became her husband.

In 1975, Cardinale played the daughter of a political exile (Adolfo Celi) in Mauro Bolognini's Libera, My Love, a character who becomes "increasingly incensed by the fascist government of Italy and makes a number of bold and very personal gestures against it". Later that year she appeared in the comedies The Immortal Bachelor with Vittorio Gassman and Blonde in Black Leather with Monica Vitti. Vitti's biographer noted how Cardinale and Vitti stood out as the female duo in a predominantly masculine cast. In 1976, Cardinale appeared in the sex comedy A Common Sense of Modesty, which was directed and written by Alberto Sordi, who also co-starred. The following year, she had a biblical role as the adulteress in the Jesus of Nazareth miniseries, which featured Robert Powell as Jesus, Anne Bancroft as Mary Magdalene, and Ernest Borgnine as Cornelius the Centurion. Cardinale starred in her husband's I Am the Law, which tells the story of Cesare Mori (Giuliano Gemma), an Italian prefect that before and during the Fascist period was best known as "the Iron Prefect". In 1978, Cardinale appeared in Damiano Damiani's political thriller, Goodbye & Amen – L'uomo della CIA, and again featured alongside Gemma in her husband's gangster picture, Father of the Godfathers, set in 1950s Sicily. After a role in another Squitieri film in 1978, L'arma, Cardinale portrayed Eleana, a Greek "gutsy brothel madame" and the girlfriend of Telly Savalas in George P. Cosmatos's adventure war film, Escape to Athena (1979).

=== 1980s ===
After a role in Si salvi chi vuole (1980) and a smaller part in Peter Zinner's The Salamander opposite Franco Nero, Anthony Quinn, and Christopher Lee, Cardinale played the love interest of Marcello Mastroianni in Liliana Cavani's war picture The Skin, a film which also reunited her with Burt Lancaster. In 1982, Cardinale appeared in Werner Herzog's Fitzcarraldo, playing a successful brothel owner who funds Klaus Kinski's purchase of an old steamship in South America. Critic Vincent Canby of The New York Times observed that although Cardinale's screen time in the film was not substantial, she "not only lights up her role, she also lights up Mr. Kinski", her performance helping transform him "into a genuinely charming screen presence". Later that year, Cardinale played opposite Pierre Mondy in the sex farce Bankers Also Have Souls, a role which biographers Lancia and Minelli say was played with a "mature charm and expressiveness".

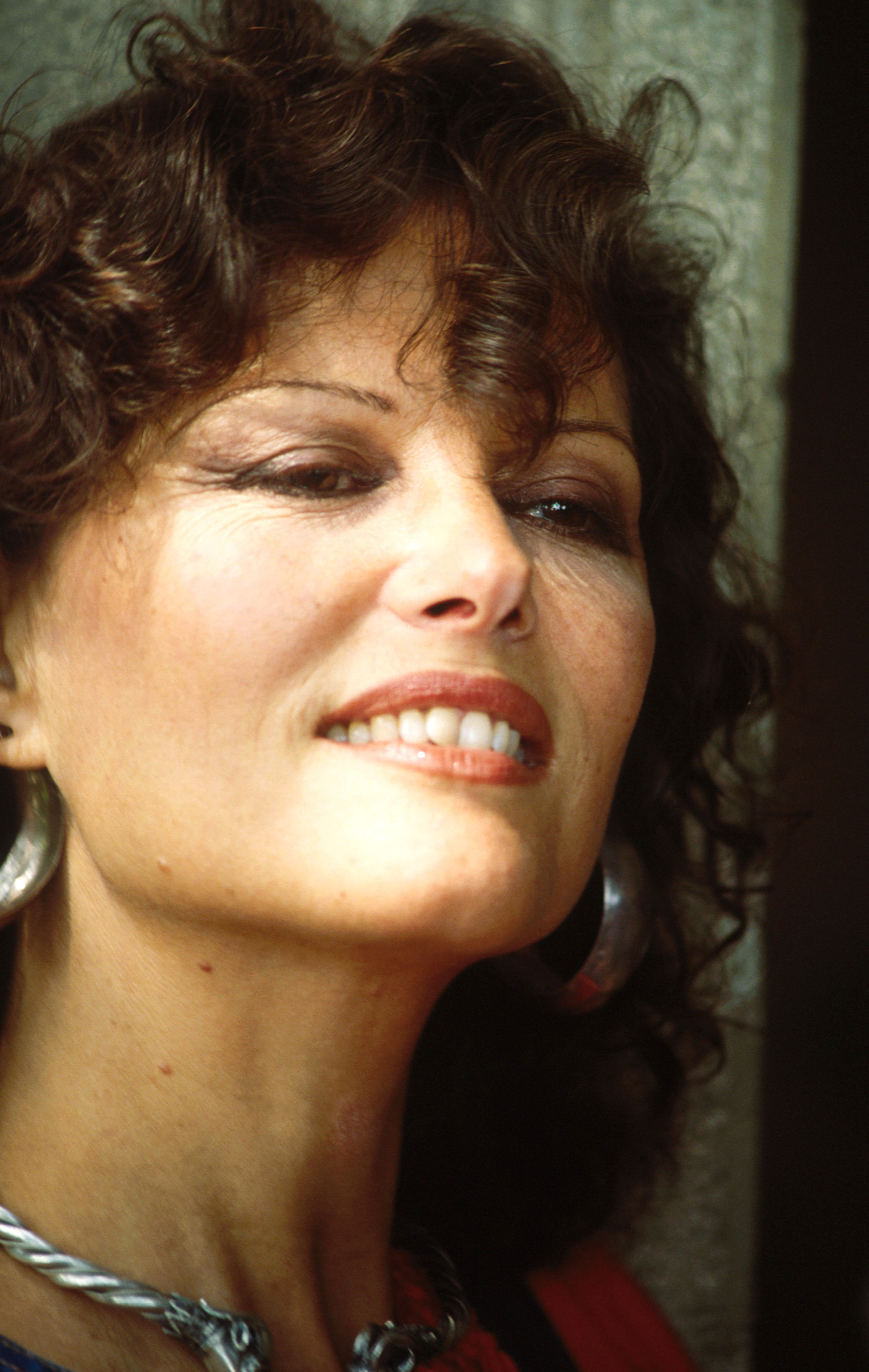
Cardinale in 1984

In 1983, Cardinale had a role in the Waris Hussein miniseries Princess Daisy and featured alongside Lino Ventura and Bernard Giraudeau in the French-Canadian film The Ruffian. In 1984, she played the love interest of Marcello Mastroianni in a Marco Bellocchio production of Henry IV, based on the Luigi Pirandello play of the same name. It was entered into the 1984 Cannes Film Festival. Squitieri's Claretta (1984), featuring Cardinale and Gemma, was entered into the competition at the 41st Venice International Film Festival. Cardinale's performance as Claretta Petacci garnered her the Nastro d'Argento for Best Actress. In 1985, Cardinale starred opposite Ben Gazzara and Lina Sastri in Alberto Bevilacqua's Woman of Wonders. It entered the competition at the 42nd Venice International Film Festival.

In 1986, Cardinale was involved in the making of two films for television. In Comencini's La storia (from Elsa Morante's novel), Cardinale portrayed a widow raising a son during World War II. In her husband's Naso di Cane, a miniseries, Enrico Lancia and Roberto Poppi praised her for her "light comic touch". In 1987, Cardinale starred opposite Peter Coyote, Greta Scacchi, and Jamie Lee Curtis in Diane Kurys's film A Man in Love (Un homme amoureux). Cardinale's performance as Scacchi's cancer-stricken mother was praised by critics, with Desson Howe of The Washington Post highlighting the "warm and radiant" elements that she brought to the role, and Hal Hinson, also of The Post, comparing Scacchi to having "the same kind of sensuality that Cardinale brought to her earlier roles". After a role in the comedy, Blu elettrico (1988), Cardinale portrayed Yolande de Polastron, a favourite of Marie Antoinette's, in the two-part film La Révolution française in 1989.

=== 1990s ===
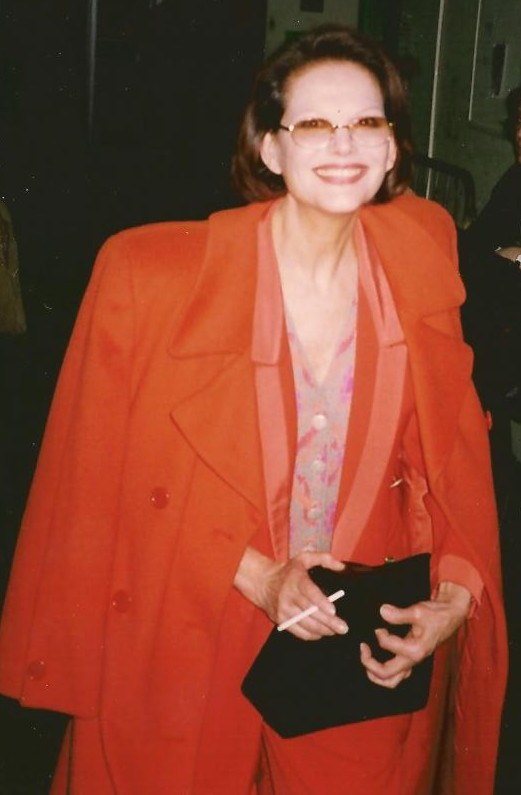
Cardinale in 1995

In 1990, Cardinale starred opposite Bruno Cremer in Squitieri's Atto di dolore, and appeared in the Morocco-set Soviet-Italian production, The Battle of the Three Kings. In 1991, Cardinale featured alongside Richard Berry and Omar Sharif in Henri Verneuil's Mayrig (meaning "mother"), a film about the struggles of an Armenian family that emigrates to Marseille from Turkey after the Armenian genocide of 1915. Such was the success of the film that Verneuil made a sequel the following year, 588, rue Paradis, also featuring mostly the same cast. Cardinale was praised by critics for her role as the mother; the Armenian General Benevolent Union of America noted the "flawless performance of these intrepid actors, especially of Claudia Cardinale". In 1993, Cardinale won the Leone d'oro alla carriera award at the Venice Film Festival, at which she was honoured along with Roman Polanski, Robert De Niro, and Steven Spielberg. Cardinale agreed to reunite with Blake Edwards, Herbert Lom, and Burt Kwouk to celebrate the 30th anniversary of The Pink Panther by making Son of the Pink Panther. In 1994, Cardinale had a role in Charlotte Dubreuil's Elles ne pensent qu'à ça..., and the following year appeared in the French TV serial 10-07: L'affaire Zeus.

In 1997, Cardinale featured in the British-Italian television drama miniseries Nostromo, an adaptation of Joseph Conrad's novel directed by Alastair Reid. Cardinale and the cast were nominated for an ALMA Award for Outstanding Latino/a Cast in a Made-for-Television Movie or Mini-Series. Later in 1997, Cardinale appeared in the films Sous les pieds des femmes and her husband's Stupor Mundi, in which she portrayed Constance of Aragon. In the French picture Riches, belles, etc. (1998), Cardinale portrayed a wealthy baroness who leaves her hotel in the care of her daughter (played by Lola Naymark) during her absence. The following year, Cardinale played the peasant mother of two children who are members of Carmine Crocco's (Enrico Lo Verso's) army during the Garibaldi era, in Squitieri's historical film Li chiamarono... briganti!.

=== 2000s ===
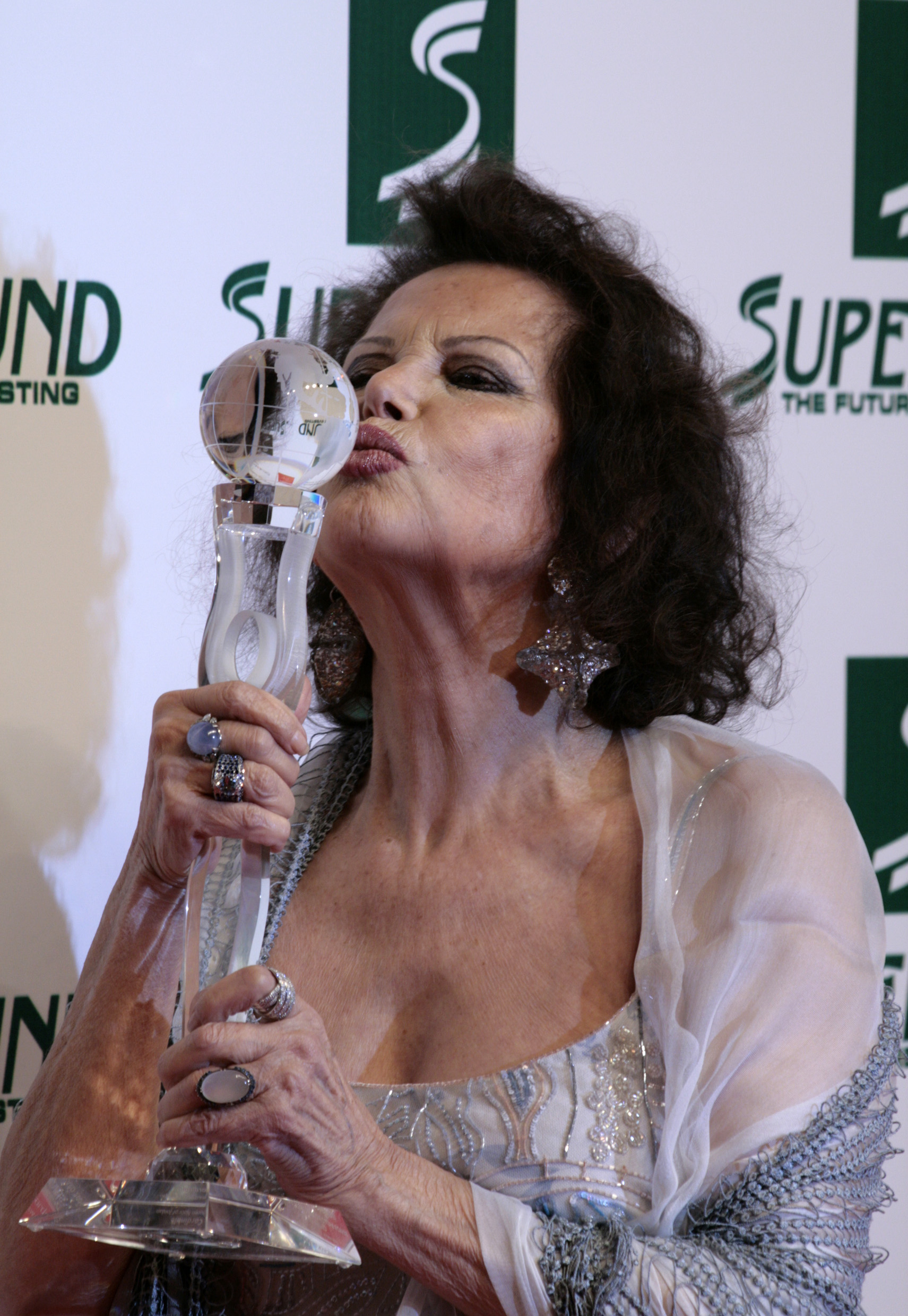
Cardinale at the Women's World Awards in 2009

In 2000, Cardinale embarked on her stage career, starring in Maurizio Scaparro's stage production of La Venexiana, adapted by René de Ceccatty, at the Théâtre du Rond-Point in Paris. She also appeared in her husband's television film, Élisabeth - Ils sont tous nos enfants. Two years later, Cardinale went on a theatrical tour of Italy, performing in Luigi Pirandello's Come tu mi vuoi, which Squitieri directed. She appeared as what Roger Ebert described as a "faded countess" opposite Jeremy Irons in Claude Lelouch's thriller film And Now... Ladies and Gentlemen, portraying a character who spends her time in Fez, Morocco, with handsome gigolos. The film was screened out of competition at the 2002 Cannes Film Festival. And Now... Ladies and Gentlemen received mixed reviews; A. O. Scott of The New York Times dismissed it as "sublimely silly", but praised the "impeccable CinemaScope compositions" and the "lush, suave score" by Michel Legrand.

In 2005, Cardinale appeared in a Philippe Adrien stage production of Tennessee Williams's Sweet Bird of Youth, and in the 2006/2007 season also featured in another Williams play, The Glass Menagerie, directed by Andrea Liberovici, in which she played the character of Amanda. In 2007, Cardinale appeared in the Aline Issermann comedy film Cherche fiancé tous frais payés, opposite Alexandra Lamy and Bruno Salomone, in a role which Patrick Besson described as "atrocious". After a role in the TV movie Hold-up à l'italienne (2008), the following year Cardinale starred in the critically acclaimed The String, playing a Tunisian mother who has a tempestuous relationship with her French-educated gay son. Michael D. Klemm of cinemaqueer.com praised Cardinale's "terrific" acting and portrayal of the "overbearing" mother.

=== 2010s ===
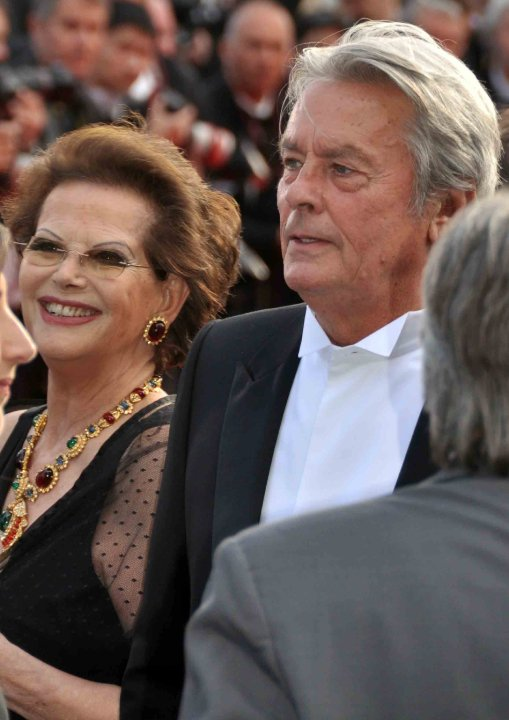
Claudia Cardinale with Alain Delon at the 2010 Cannes Film Festival

In 2010, Cardinale received the Golden Orange Best Actress Award at the 47th Antalya "Golden Orange" International Film Festival for her performance as an elderly Italian woman who takes in a young Turkish exchange student in Signora Enrica. The Turkish-Italian co-production was shot in locations in Istanbul and Rimini.

In 2012, Cardinale featured opposite Jeanne Moreau and Michael Lonsdale in the final feature film to be directed by Portuguese director Manoel de Oliveira, Gebo and the Shadow. The Hollywood Reporter praised its "ensemble of superb older performers". Another film in which Cardinale acted, released in 2012, was The Artist and the Model. In it, she starred along with Jean Rochefort. In 2013, Cardinale starred alongside supporting actresses Patricia Black and Chloé Cunha in Nadia Szold's Joy de V., and had a role in Ernst Gossner's war drama The Silent Mountain, a love story set in the Dolomite Mountains in 1915 at the outbreak of World War I between Italy and Austria-Hungary. Gossner described her as "a terrific spirit on the set", and noted that Cardinale told the production team "legendary stories" about Marcello Mastroianni. In 2014, Cardinale portrayed an Italian chaperone viscountess in the British period drama film Effie Gray, for which Variety reviewer Guy Lodge deemed her and fellow cast members "overqualified" and "given far little to do". While promoting Effie Gray, in an interview Cardinale said: "I still continue to work, it's 142 movies now. Usually when you are old you don't work any more, but I still work, which is good.... I've been very lucky because I've had many fantastic directors with me, Fellini, Visconti, Blake Edwards, lots and lots...".

On 11 October 2018 she received the Tabernas de Cine award in the Almería Western Film Festival.

=== 2020s ===
In 2020, Cardinale headlined the Swiss miniseries Bulle. Later that year, she had a role in the Netflix film Rogue City; her performance was among those praised by Elisabeth Vincentelli's New York Times review.

== Personal life ==
When she was 19, Cardinale was kidnapped and raped by a man whose name she never revealed. This resulted in a pregnancy, her first child, a son named Patrick. For the first seven years, Patrick was raised as her younger brother. Later, she revealed her true identity to him, and the child was adopted by Cardinale's then-partner, Franco Cristaldi, whom she met in 1958. The couple had a marriage party, but did not marry, and became increasingly detached.

Starting in 1975 until his death on 18 February 2017 at age 78, Pasquale Squitieri, an Italian film director, lived with Cardinale. They had a daughter, Claudia. Her niece, Francesca, is also an actress.

Fluent in French, Sicilian, Italian, English, Arabic, and Spanish, Cardinale was a heavy smoker for most of her life. She stopped smoking in the last year of her life.

Cardinale was a political liberal who supported feminist causes over the years. Although she lived in Paris, Cardinale was outspoken about being identified as an Italian, and in 2018 was awarded the rank of Knight Grand Cross of the Order of Merit of the Italian Republic. She was a UNESCO goodwill ambassador for the Defence of Women's Rights since March 2000, and a goodwill ambassador for the UNESCO World Water Day for 2006.

Cardinale published an autobiography with Anne Mori, Io Claudia, Tu Claudia, in 1995. Her awards include an honorary Golden Lion at the 1993 Venice Film Festival, and an Honorary Golden Bear at the 2002 Berlin Film Festival. The Los Angeles Times Magazine, in a February 2011 online feature, named Cardinale among the 50 most beautiful women in film history. Cardinale said it was important to her to keep her professional and personal lives separate. In a 2014 interview, Cardinale attributed her inner strength to her success.

Cardinale reacted to the death of Alain Delon by publishing a statement to pay tribute to the French movie star, her cinema companion and long-time friend, with whom she had shared the poster in The Leopard, Rocco and His Brothers and Lost Command.

In September 2025, Cardinale paid tribute to the fashion designer Giorgio Armani upon his passing, saying news of his death caused her great pain.

== Death and tributes ==
Cardinale died, at the age of 87, on 23 September 2025, at her home in Nemours, Île-de-France. Her funeral was at Saint-Roch in Paris.

== Awards and nominations ==
Year	Award	Category	Nominated work	Result
1964	Golden Laurel	Top Female New Face		7th place
1968	David di Donatello Awards	David di Donatello for Best Actress	The Day of the Owl	Won
1972	David di Donatello Awards	David di Donatello for Best Actress	A Girl in Australia	Won
1972	Photoplay Gold Medal	Favorite Female Star		Nominated
1976	Cairo International Film Festival	Career Achievement Award	—N/a	Honored
1984	Venice Film Festival Award	Best Actress	Claretta	Won
1985	Nastro d'Argento	Nastro d'Argento for Best Actress	Claretta	Won
1990	Prix du Festival	Best Achievement in Cinema		Won
1993	Venice Film Festival Award	Career Golden Lion		Won
1997	David di Donatello Awards	Special David		Won
1997	David di Donatello Awards	Career David		Won
2002	Golden Bear	Honorary Golden Bear		Won
2010	Golden Orange	Best Actress	Signora Enrica	Won
2011	Locarno Film Festival	Leonard Career Award		Won
