= Vento del sud =

- Film poster
- Directed by: Enzo Provenzale
- Written by: Giuseppe Mangione (screenplay), Giuseppe Mangione (story)
- Starring: Renato Salvatori, Claudia Cardinale
- Cinematography: Gianni Di Venanzo
- Edited by: Ruggero Mastroianni
- Music by: Gino Marinuzzi Jr.
- Distributed by: Cinecittà, Lux Film, Lux-Panarecord
- Release date: 1959
- Running time: 98 minutes
- Country: Italy
- Language: Italian

Vento del sud also known as South Wind is a 1959 Italian mafia crime thriller film directed by Enzo Provenzale starring Claudia Cardinale and Renato Salvatori.

== Cast ==
- Renato Salvatori ... Antonio Spagara
- Claudia Cardinale ... Grazia Macri
- Rossella Falk ... Deodata Macri
- Laura Adani ... The baroness
- Giuseppe Cirino ... Luigino
- Salvatore Fazio ... The knight
- Ivo Garrani ... The mafia godfather
- Annibale Ninchi ... Marquis Macri
- Sara Simoni ... The landlady
- Franco Volpi... Guido Lo Gozzo
