= Blu elettrico =

- Directed by: Elfriede Gaeng
- Starring: Claudia Cardinale
- Music by: Stelvio Cipriani
- Release date: 1988
- Country: Italy
- Language: Italian

Blu elettrico is a 1988 Italian comedy film directed by Elfriede Gaeng. It stars Claudia Cardinale and William Berger.
