= Si salvi chi vuole =

- Directed by: Roberto Faenza
- Starring: Claudia Cardinale
- Edited by: Ruggero Mastroianni
- Music by: Ennio Morricone
- Release date: 1980
- Running time: 94 minutes
- Country: Italy
- Language: Italian

Si salvi chi vuole is a 1980 Italian film. It stars Claudia Cardinale.

== Cast ==
- Gastone Moschin: Stefano
- Claudia Cardinale: Luisa
- Enrico Vecchi: Enrico
- Ilaria Vecchi: Antonella
- Francesco De Rosa: Poldo
