= Joy de V. =

Joy de V
- Theatrical release poster
- Directed by: Nadia Szold
- Written by: Nadia Szold
- Produced by: Nadia Szold
- Starring: Evan Louison; Josephine de La Baume; Iva Gocheva; Claudia Cardinale; Rocco Sisto; Victoria Imperioli
- Cinematography: Tristan Allen
- Edited by: Kristen Swanbeck
- Music by: Noah Plotkin; John Prince
- Production company: Cinema Imperfecta
- Release date: 20 January 2013
- Running time: 84 minutes
- Country: United States
- Language: English

Joy de V. is a 2013 New York noir dramatic thriller film directed and written by Nadia Szold. It won a Special Jury Mention at the 2013 Slamdance Film Festival. The film starred Evan Louison, Josephine de La Baume, Iva Gocheva, and Claudia Cardinale.

== Plot ==
A young con artist, playing the system and collecting checks for a mental disability, is planning a public show to prove his madness when threatened with losing his disability checks. Before he is able to stage his rant, his pregnant girl friend disappears and he must search the city for her.

== Cast ==
- Evan Louison as Roman
- Joséphine de La Baume as Joy
- Lady Rizo as False Joy
- Iva Gocheva as Marina
- Claudia Cardinale as Signora Morosini
- Rocco Sisto as Antoine
- Victoria Imperioli as Laszla
- Salvatore Ciccero as Ciro
- Chloé Cunha as Police Officer
- Patricia Black as Patricia
- Nina Eristavi as Julie (voice)
- Reilly Hadden as Jude
- Maïa Ibar as Amelia
- Vadim Imperioli as Daniel
- Katharina Kowalewski as Ava
- Kristina Lieberson as Esme
- Lizzie Lieberson as Cameron
- Jacqueline Loss as Jackie
