= The Ruffian =

- Directed by: José Giovanni
- Screenplay by: José Giovanni
- Based on: Les Ruffian by José Giovanni
- Produced by: Christian Fechner
- Starring: Lino Ventura; Bernard Giraudeau; Claudia Cardinale
- Cinematography: Jean-Paul Schwartz
- Edited by: Jacqueline Thiédot
- Music by: Ennio Morricone
- Release date: 1983
- Language: French

The Ruffian (French: Le Ruffian) is a 1983 French-Canadian crime adventure film written and directed by José Giovanni and starring Lino Ventura, Bernard Giraudeau and Claudia Cardinale. It is based on Giovanni's 1969 novel Les Ruffian.

== Plot ==
The film follows Aldo, an adventurer who works at a gold mine in Canada. The mine is attacked by bandits, who kill everyone except Aldo and two First Nations people. They seek revenge by killing the bandits and stealing back their gold. Having suspicion of the two First Nations people, Aldo then proceeds to run off without them, but then loses the gold in a river. He drives to his home Montreal to recruit his friends John and Gérard, and his wife Éléonore, to help him retrieve the gold from the river. Meanwhile, the two First Nations people whom Aldo betrayed seek to recover the gold as well.

== Cast ==
- Lino Ventura as Aldo Sévenac
- Bernard Giraudeau as Gérard Jackson
- Claudia Cardinale as Catherine Hansen
- Pierre Frag as John
- Béatrix Van Til as Éléonore
- August Schellenberg as Nelson Harting
