= Libera, My Love =

1975 film

- Film poster
- Directed by: Mauro Bolognini
- Written by: Nicola Badalucco; Mauro Bolognini; Luciano Vincenzoni
- Produced by: Roberto Loyola
- Starring: Claudia Cardinale
- Cinematography: Franco Di Giacomo
- Edited by: Nino Baragli
- Music by: Ennio Morricone
- Release date: 1975
- Running time: 110 minutes
- Country: Italy
- Language: Italian

Libera, My Love (Italian: Libera, amore mio...) is a 1975 Italian drama film directed by Mauro Bolognini and starring Claudia Cardinale. Running from about 1905 to 1945, it features a fiery Italian woman who rejects Catholicism, fascism, communism and even liberal democracy to live and die a committed anarchist.

== Cast ==
- Claudia Cardinale as Libera Valente
- Bruno Cirino as Matteo Zanoni
- Adolfo Celi as Libera's father
- Philippe Leroy as Franco Testa
- Luigi Diberti as Ceccarelli, the taxi driver
- Tullio Altamura
- Rosalba Neri as Wanda, wife of Testa
- Eleonora Morana
- Rosita Pisano
- Luigi Patriarca
- Marco Lucantoni as Libera's son
- M. Vittoria Virgili
- Elisabetta Virgili
- Bekim Fehmiu as Sandro Poggi
- Franco Balducci
