= Blindfold (1966 film) =

1966 film by Philip Dunne

- Film poster by Joseph Smith
- Directed by: Philip Dunne
- Screenplay by: Philip Dunne; W. H. Menger
- Based on: Blindfold (1960) by Lucille Fletcher
- Produced by: Marvin Schwartz
- Starring: Rock Hudson; Claudia Cardinale
- Cinematography: Joseph MacDonald
- Edited by: Ted J. Kent
- Music by: Lalo Schifrin
- Production companies: 7 Pictures; Gibraltar Productions
- Distributed by: Universal Pictures
- Release date: May 25, 1966 (New York)
- Running time: 102 minutes
- Country: United States
- Language: English

Blindfold is a 1966 American romantic comedy (with espionage overtones) film co-written and directed by Philip Dunne that was his last feature film. It starred Rock Hudson in his 50th film, which he produced through his film production company, Gibraltar Productions. It co-starred Claudia Cardinale, Jack Warden and Guy Stockwell. The film was distributed by Universal Pictures. It was based on Lucille Fletcher's 1960 novel of the same name. Sequences were filmed in Central Park in New York City and in Silver Springs, Florida.

== Plot ==
General Pratt, a national security chief, and his aides approach Dr. Bartholomew Snow, a successful psychiatrist, to assist the U.S. government in secrecy. A patient once psychoanalyzed by Dr. Snow is a government scientist who has had a mental breakdown. General Pratt hides the patient, Arthur Vincenti, in a remote place known only as "Base X", forcing Dr. Snow to wear a blindfold whenever he is taken there by airplane and car.

Enemy agents and an organization who kidnap and sell scientists to the highest bidder want to know what Vincenti knows, so he is in danger. The patient's sister, beautiful Vicky Vincenti, mistakenly believes that Dr. Snow is the one who abducted him. When she has the doctor arrested, Snow, in order to keep the Vincenti affair secret, tells both the authorities and the press that he and Vicky are engaged to be married and are actually having a lovers' quarrel. Snow, a man with seven failed engagements, sees nothing wrong with fabricating a false engagement to keep Vicky quiet. All are satisfied with the explanation except a suspicious NYPD detective named Harrigan.

A stuttering man named Fitzpatrick turns up for a session with Dr. Snow and shows CIA credentials. Fitzpatrick claims to Dr. Snow that it is actually General Pratt who is the enemy agent. That makes sense to Dr. Snow as he could not understand why Vincenti would not have been placed in a military hospital. Unable to find the general, and with the authorities unwilling to reveal whether General Pratt or Fitzpatrick work for the government, Dr. Snow tries to recreate sounds he heard while blindfolded to trace his way back to Base X. He does so, only to find that Fitzpatrick has taken both Vincenti and Pratt captive. But soldiers arrive in airboats and place Fitzpatrick under arrest, leaving Vicky to consider whether she would like her make-believe engagement to Dr. Snow to be real.

== Cast ==
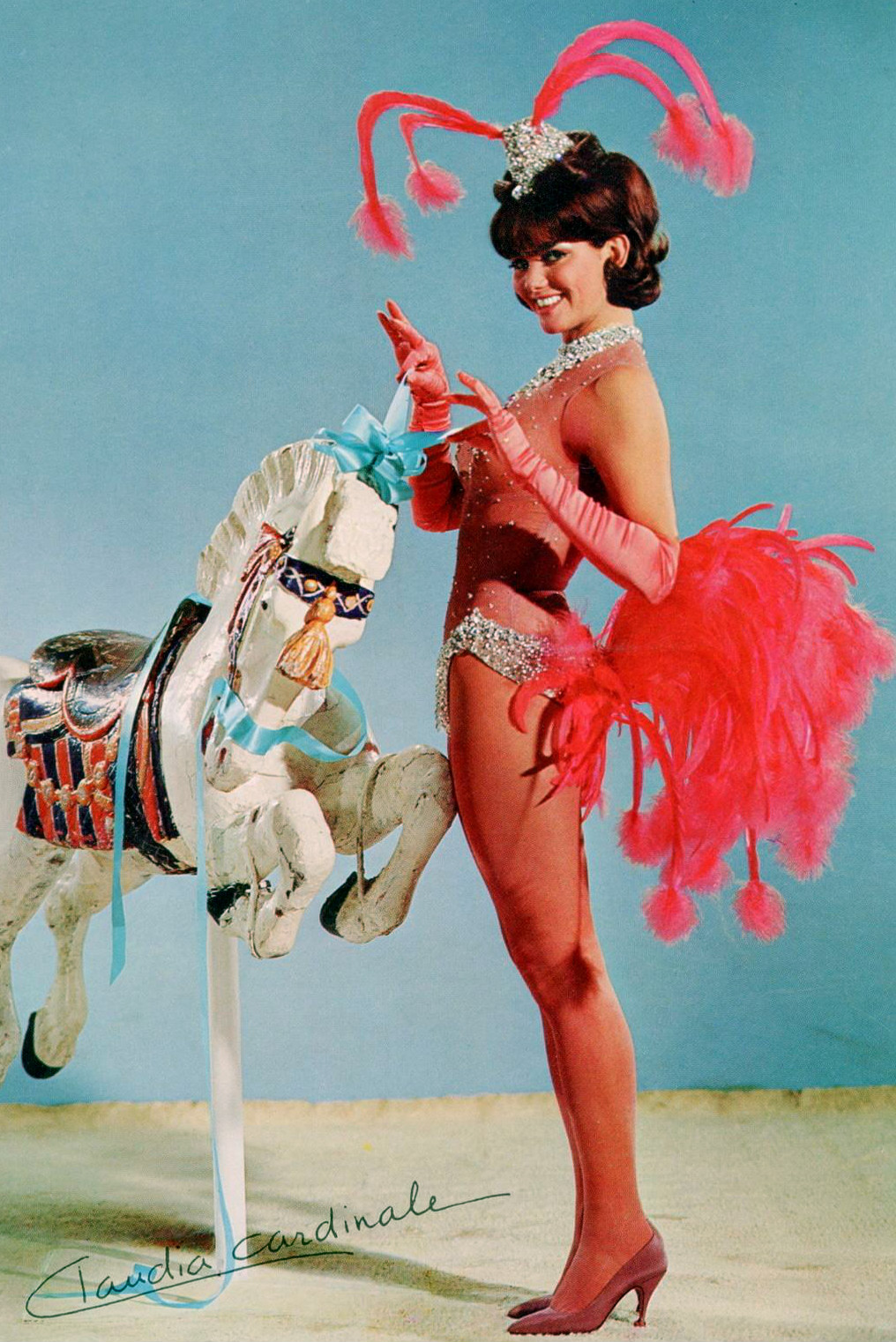
Claudia Cardinale in one of her costumes for the film

- Rock Hudson as Dr. Bartholomew Snow
- Claudia Cardinale as Vicky Vincenti (this role was the actress's Hollywood film debut)
- Jack Warden as General Pratt
- Guy Stockwell as James Fitzpatrick
- Brad Dexter as Detective Harrigan
- Anne Seymour as Smitty
- Alejandro Rey as Arthur Vincenti
- Hari Rhodes as Captain Davis
- Vito Scotti as Michaelangelo Vincenti
- Angela Clarke as Lavinia Vincenti
- John Megna as Mario Vincenti
- Paul Comi as Barker
- Ned Glass as Lippy
- Mort Mills as Hombrug
- Jack De Mave as Hombrug
- Robert F. Simon as Police Lieutenant (as Robert Simon)

== Production ==
The film was based on a 1960 novel by Lucille Fletcher. The New York Times called it "swiftly told and entertaining".

In June 1961, 20th Century Fox bought the screen rights and assigned the project to producer David Helwell. Robert Bassing wrote the first screenplay.

The film took a number of years to be made. It was reactivated in September 1964 by former press agent turned producer Marvin Schwartz, who set up the project at Universal with Rock Hudson attached to star and Phil Dunne to direct. Dunne wrote the script with W.H. Menger. "The whole thing is a spoof on aspects of our security", said Hudson.

Dunne says that Ronald Reagan auditioned for the role of the villain. "Seemed perfectly lightweight", he said, "I just didn't think he could handle it and told him so, and he said it was okay, that he was thinking of going into politics anyhow. If I'd hired him, he might not have gotten to the White House."

Filming started in January 1965. Florida second unit scenes were shot in February 1965 at Paradise Park on Silver River, Sharpes Ferry Bridge, Indian Lake and at the Silver Springs Airport with members of an Ocala, Florida, community theatre group called the Marion Players acting as stand-ins and doubles for the principal actors. Ross Allen's Reptile Institute provided most of the alligators for the swamp scenes.

With the glut of espionage films of the time, the film was not released until mid-1966. Dunne said that Hudson thought he was making too many comedies and wished to return to dramatic roles, however Dunne felt it was difficult to sell Hudson as a psychologist as he didn't seem to project scholarly intelligence. Dunne complained that Fletcher's original story was too fragile for a two-hour film, though he called the film 'slick' that made a profit due to Hudson's personality.

== Reception ==
The film earned an estimated $2 million in rentals in North America.

Filmink argued "The film helped kill off the directorial career of Philip Dunne and Hudson’s reign as a box office powerhouse. Still, Cardinale has some first-rate outfits and the two make a nice team."

== Influence ==
The sequences in which Hudson's character of Dr. Snow finds the secret base using only sounds that he heard on the journey were used in Joe Smith, American and its remake The Big Operator, and were borrowed for an almost identical scene in the 1992 film Sneakers.
