= Aline Issermann =

French filmmaker (born 1948)

- Born: 16 November 1948 (age 77); Paris, France
- Occupations: Filmmaker, director, screenwriter
- Notable work: Le Destin de Juliette (1983); L'Amant magnifique (1986); La Vallée des anges (1988)

Aline Issermann (born 16 November 1948 in Paris) is a French filmmaker. She began her career as an author and illustrator of comics, then became director of feature films and television films. Among her films are Le Destin de Juliette (1983), L'Amant magnifique (1986), La Vallée des anges (1988), L'Ombre du doute (1993), Dieu, l'amant de ma mère et le fils du charcutier (1995) and Cherche fiancé tous frais payés (2007).
