= Nadia Szold =

American filmmaker

- Born: September 28, 1984 (age 41); Pittsfield, MA
- Education: Hotchkiss School (Highschool) New York University Gallatin School of Individualized Study (University)
- Years active: 2002-present
- Known for: Film Director, Producer, Writer
- Spouse: Steven Prince (2020 –)
- Children: Sydney Jerome Prince
- Parents: David Harris Lippman (father); Honey Sharp Lippman (mother)
- Family: Abby Ginzberg (cousin) Eli Ginzberg (great uncle) Mort Lindsey (grandfather) Henrietta Szold (great great aunt)
- Website: nadiaszold.com

Nadia Szold (born 28 September 1984) is a film director, producer and writer. She began working in theater in her teens in New England. After reading Waiting for Godot at 17, Nadia Szold formed Cojones Company. Fourteen plays later, she founded Cinema Imperfecta out of her apartment in Red Hook, Brooklyn. Hope & Anchor, Thievery, The Persian Love Cake and Some Kinda Fuckery were the first short films produced and directed under its banner in Paris and New York. Simultaneously, Szold worked for Robin O'Hara and Scott Macaulay of Forensic Films. She also earned a degree from Werner Herzog’s Rogue Film School.

Her first feature film, which she both produced and wrote, Joy de V., premiered at Slamdance in 2013 to critical acclaim and won a Special Jury Mention. The film starred Evan Louison, Josephine de La Baume, Iva Gocheva, and Claudia Cardinale. Her second feature, Mariah, starring Dakota Goldhor and Evan Louison, was shot in Mexico during the rise of vigilante groups reclaiming cartel controlled regions.

In 2020, she married Steven Prince, the subject of the 1978 Martin Scorsese documentary American Boy: A Profile of Steven Prince. They had been in a relationship for several years prior and had one child together.

A Film Independent Fellow of the 2016 Documentary Lab, Szold's first feature documentary was the award-winning archival documentary "Larry Flynt for President" (2021). It premiered The Tribeca Festival and then went on to win multiple audience and jury awards on the festival circuit. Nadia's second documentary feature was "The Figures: An Abstract on Geoffrey Young" (2024) about the poet, artist and gallerist Geoffrey Young.

== Filmography ==
- Thievery (2007)
- The Persian Love Cake (2008)
- Some Kinda Fuckery (2009)
- Joy de V. (2013)
- Mariah (2014)
- Larry Flynt for President (2021)
- "The Figures: An Abstract on Geoffrey Young" (2024)
