= Pasquale Squitieri =

Italian film director (1938–2017)

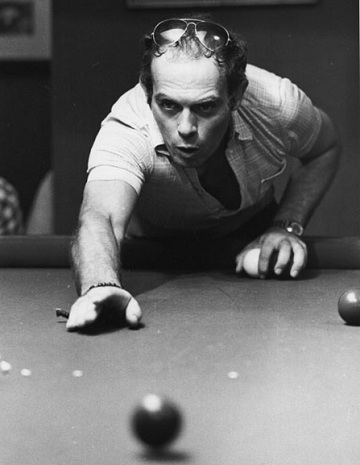
- Born: 27 November 1938; Naples, Italy
- Died: 18 February 2017 (aged 78); Rome, Italy
- Occupations: Film director; screenwriter
- Years active: 1969–2017
- Spouse: Ottavia Fusco (m. 2013)
- Partner: Claudia Cardinale (1975–2017)
- Children: 1

Pasquale Squitieri (27 November 1938 – 18 February 2017) was an Italian film director and screenwriter.

== Life and career ==
Born in Naples, Squitieri graduated in law, then was briefly involved in stage, as author ("La battaglia") and even actor (directed by Francesco Rosi). He made his film debut with Io e Dio, produced by Vittorio De Sica, and, after two Spaghetti Westerns he signed as William Redford, he focused on drama films centered on political and social issues. Squitieri's film I Am the Law won the David di Donatello for Best Film in 1978. Li chiamarono... briganti!, a film about the brigand Carmine Crocco, was suspended from the cinemas and it is not available on the home video market. Squitieri was the partner of Claudia Cardinale since 1975. His 1980 film Savage Breed was entered into the 12th Moscow International Film Festival. Since 2003, Squitieri had been romantically linked to actress and singer Ottavia Fusco, whom he had married in December 2013.

== Selected filmography ==
- Io e Dio (1969)
- Django Defies Sartana (1970)
- Vengeance Is a Dish Served Cold (1971)
- Gang War in Naples (1972)
- Blood Brothers (1974)
- The Climber (1975)
- I Am the Law (1977)
- Corleone (1978)
- L'arma (1978)
- Savage Breed (1980)
- Claretta (1984)
- The Repenter (1985)
- Naso di cane (1986) (TV miniseries)
- The Third Solution (1988)
- Gli invisibili (1988)
- Atto di dolore (1990)
- Il colore dell'odio (1990)
- Geografia della fame (1991)
- Li chiamarono... briganti! (1999)
- L'avvocato de Gregorio (2003)
- Father (2011)
