= Klaus Kinski filmography and discography =

Klaus Kinski (1926–1991) was a German actor who appeared in more than 130 films.

== Feature films ==
Year	Title	Role	Director(s)	Notes	Ref(s)
1948	Morituri	Holländischer Häftling	Eugen York		
1951	Decision Before Dawn	Whining soldier	Anatole Litvak		
1954	Fear	Cabaret artist	Roberto Rossellini		
1955	Ludwig II	Prinz Otto	Helmut Käutner		
1955	Children, Mother, and the General	Leutnant, der nicht mehr lacht	Laslo Benedek		
1955	Hanussen	Erik von Spazier a.k.a. Mirko	Georg Marischka; O. W. Fischer		
1955	Sarajevo	Cabrinovic	Fritz Kortner		
1956	Winter in the Woods	Otto Hartwig	Wolfgang Liebeneiner		
1956	Beloved Corinna	Klaus Brockmann	Eduard von Borsody		
1958	A Time to Love and a Time to Die	Gestapo Leutnant	Detlef Sierck		
1960	The Avenger	Dramaturg Lorenz Voss	Karl Anton		
1961	The Dead Eyes of London	Edgar Strauss	Alfred Vohrer		
1961	The Strange Countess	Stuart Bresset	Josef von Báky; Jürgen Roland		
1961	The Devil's Daffodil	Peter Keene	Akos von Rathonyi		
1961	Bankraub in der Rue Latour	Autor Bex	Curd Jürgens		
1962	The Puzzle of the Red Orchid	Der schöne Steve	Helmut Ashley		
1962	The Counterfeit Traitor	Kindler	George Seaton		
1962	The Red Frenzy	Martin	Wolfgang Schleif		
1962	Die Tür mit den 7 Schlössern	Pheeny	Alfred Vohrer		
1962	The Inn on the River	Gregor Gubanow	Alfred Vohrer		
1963	The Squeaker	Krishna	Alfred Vohrer		
1963	The Black Cobra	Koks-Charly / Charley 'The Snow'	Rudolf Zehetgruber		
1963	The Black Abbot	Thomas Fortuna	Franz Josef Gottlieb		
1963	The Indian Scarf	Peter Ross	Alfred Vohrer		
1963	Scotland Yard Hunts Dr. Mabuse	Inspector Joe Wright	Paul May		
1963	Kali Yug: Goddess of Vengeance	Saddhu	Mario Camerini		
1963	The Mystery of the Indian Temple	Saddhu	Mario Camerini		
1963	The Secret of the Black Widow	Boyd	Franz Josef Gottlieb		
1963	Piccadilly null Uhr zwölf	Whity Skipper	Rudolf Zehetgruber		
1964	The Last Ride to Santa Cruz	José	Rolf Olsen		
1964	Mark of the Tortoise	Shapiro	Alfred Vohrer		
1964	The Curse of the Hidden Vault	George	Franz Josef Gottlieb		
1964	Winnetou - 2. Teil	David 'Luke' Lucas	Harald Reinl		
1964	The Secret of the Chinese Carnation	Speranzo	Rudolf Zehetgruber		
1964	Traitor's Gate	Kane	Freddie Francis		
1965	Neues vom Hexer	Edwards	Alfred Vohrer		
1965	The Dirty Game	Russian Agent	Christian-Jaque; Werner Klingler; Carlo Lizzani; Terence Young		
1965	Estambul 65	Schenck	Antonio Isasi-Isasmendi		
1965	The Pleasure Girls	Nikko Stalmar	Gerry O'Hara		
1965	For a Few Dollars More	Wild	Sergio Leone		
1965	Doctor Zhivago	Kostoyed	David Lean		
1966	Our Man in Marrakesh	Jonquil	Don Sharp		
1966	Circus of Fear	Manfred	John Llewellyn Moxey		
1966	Killer's Carnival	Gomez (Rio segment)	Alberto Cardone; Robert Lynn; Sheldon Reynolds; Louis Soulanes		
1966	Target for Killing	Caporetti	Manfred R. Köhler		
1966	A Bullet for the General	El Santo	Damiano Damiani		
1966	Lasciapassare per l'Inferno		George Fuller	Unreleased	
1967	Man, Pride and Vengeance	Lt. Miguel Garcia	Luigi Bazzoni		
1967	Creature with the Blue Hand	Dave Emerson / Richard Emerson	Alfred Vohrer		
1967	The Million Eyes of Sumuru	President Boong	Lindsay Shonteff		
1967	Five Golden Dragons	Gert	Jeremy Summers		
1967	Grand Slam	Erich Weiss	Giuliano Montaldo		
1968	Shoot Twice	Victor Barret / Dingus	Nando Cicero		
1968	Coplan Saves His Skin	Theler	Yves Boisset		
1968	Psychopath	Periwinkle	Guido Zurli	AKA Mister Zehn Prozent - Miezen und Moneten	
1968	If You Meet Sartana Pray for Your Death	Morgan	Gianfranco Parolini		
1968	The Vatican Affair	Clint Rogers	Emilio Miraglia		
1968	The Great Silence	Tigrero / Loco	Sergio Corbucci		
1968	Ognuno per sé	Brent il Biondo	Giorgio Capitani		
1968	The Cats	Adam	Duccio Tessari	AKA I Bastardi	
1969	Five for Hell	SS Col. Hans Mueller	Gianfranco Parolini		
1969	Marquis de Sade: Justine	Marquis de Sade	Jesús Franco		
1969	Double Face	John Alexander	Riccardo Freda	AKA Puzzle of Horrors	
1969	Gangster's Law	Regnier	Siro Marcellini		
1969	Il dito nella piaga	Cpl. Brian Haskins / Norman Carr	Tonino Ricci		
1969	Venus in Furs	Ahmed Kortobaw	Jesús Franco	AKA Paroxismus	
1969	I am Sartana, Your Angel of Death	Hot Dead	Giuliano Carnimeo		
1970	The Naughty Cheerleader	Juan José Ignatio Rodriguez de Calderon / 'Sam'	Will Tremper		
1970	And God Said to Cain	Gary Hamilton	Antonio Margheriti		
1970	Count Dracula	R.M. Renfield	Jesús Franco		
1970	La peau de torpedo	Pavel Richko / Torpédo I	Jean Delannoy		
1970	Rendezvous with Dishonour	Evagoras	Adriano Bolzoni		
1970	Churchill's Leopards	Hauptsturmführer Holtz	Maurizio Pradeaux		
1970	Rough Justice	Johnny Laster	Mario Costa	AKA La Belva	
1971	A Barrel Full of Dollars	Hagen / Slander	Demofilo Fidani		
1971	Lo chiamavano King	Brian Foster	Giancarlo Romitelli		
1971	Slaughter Hotel	Dr. Francis Clay	Fernando Di Leo		
1971	La vendetta è un piatto che si serve freddo	Prescott	Pasquale Squitieri		
1971	Prega il morto e ammazza il vivo	Dan Hogan	Giuseppe Vari		
1971	Web of the Spider	Edgar Allan Poe	Antonio Margheriti		
1971	Il venditore di morte	Chester Conway	Lorenzo Gicca Palli		
1971	Eye of the Spider	Hans Fischer, "The Polish"	Roberto Bianchi Montero		
1971	Black Killer	James Webb / Black Killer	Carlo Croccolo		
1971	A Fistful of Death	Reverend Cotton	Demofilo Fidani	AKA Adios Compañeros	
1972	Il ritorno di Clint il solitario	Scott	Alfonso Balcázar		
1972	Aguirre, der Zorn Gottes	Don Lope de Aguirre	Werner Herzog		
1973	Death Smiles at a Murderer	Dr. Sturges	Joe D'Amato	aka Death Smiles at Murder	
1973	The Bloody Hands of the Law	Vito Quattroni	Mario Gariazzo		
1973	The Fighting Fist of Shanghai Joe	Scalper Jack	Mario Caiano		
1974	Lover of the Monster	Prof. Alex Nijinsky	Sergio Garrone		
1974	The Hand That Feeds the Dead	Prof. Alex Nijinsky	Sergio Garrone		
1974	Heroes in Hell	Gen. Kaufmann	Joe D'Amato		
1974	Chi ha rubato il tesoro dello scia?		Guido Leoni	Unreleased	
1975	Footprints on the Moon	Prof. Blackmann	Luigi Bazzoni		
1975	L'important c'est d'aimer	Karl-Heinz Zimmer	Andrzej Żuławski		
1975	Return of Shanghai Joe	Pat Barnes	Bitto Albertini		
1975	Lifespan	Nicholas Ulrich	Alexander Whitelaw		
1975	Un genio, due compari, un pollo	Doc Foster	Damiano Damiani		
1975	Das Netz	Emilio Bossi	Manfred Purzer		
1976	Jack the Ripper	Dr. Dennis Orloff	Jesús Franco		
1976	Golden Night	Michel Fournier	Serge Moati		
1977	Operation Thunderbolt	Wilfried Boese	Menahem Golan		
1977	Madame Claude	Alexander Zakis	Just Jaeckin		
1977	Death of a Corrupt Man	Nicolas Tomski	Georges Lautner		
1978	The Song of Roland	Roland / Klaus	Frank Cassenti		
1979	Nosferatu the Vampyre	Count Dracula	Werner Herzog		
1979	Zoo Zéro	Yavé, le directeur du zoo	Alain Fleischer		
1979	Woyzeck	Woyzeck	Werner Herzog		
1980	Haine	Le motard	Dominique Goult		
1980	Schizoid	Pieter Fales	David Paulsen		
1980	La Femme Enfant	Marcel	Raphaële Billetdoux		
1981	Fruits of Passion	Sir Stephen	Shūji Terayama		
1981	Venom	Jacmel	Piers Haggard		
1981	Buddy Buddy	Dr. Hugo Zuckerbrot	Billy Wilder		
1982	Fitzcarraldo	Brian Sweeney "Fitzcarraldo" Fitzgerald	Werner Herzog		
1982	The Soldier	Dracha	James Glickenhaus		
1982	Android	Dr. Daniel	Aaron Lipstadt		
1982	Love and Money	Frederic Stockheinz	James Toback		
1982	Burden of Dreams	Himself	Les Blank	Archive footage	
1984	Code Name: Wild Geese	Charlton	Antonio Margheriti		
1984	The Little Drummer Girl	Martin Kurtz	George Roy Hill		
1984	The Secret Diary of Sigmund Freud	Dr. Max Bauer	Danford B. Greene		
1985	Creature	Hans Rudy Hofner	William Malone	AKA The Titan Find	
1985	Kommando Leopard	Silveira	Antonio Margheriti		
1985	El caballero del dragón	Boetius	Fernando Colomo	AKA Star Knight	
1986	Revenge of the Stolen Stars	Donald McBride	Ulli Lommel		
1986	Crawlspace	Karl Gunther	David Schmoeller		
1987	Cobra Verde	Francisco Manoel da Silva / Cobra Verde	Werner Herzog		
1987	Location Africa	Himself	Steff Gruber	Archive footage	
1988	Grandi cacciatori	Klaus Naginsky	Augusto Caminito		
1988	Vampire in Venice	Nosferatu	Augusto Caminito, Klaus Kinski		
1989	Kinski Paganini	Niccolò Paganini	Klaus Kinski	Final film role	
1999	My Best Fiend	Himself	Werner Herzog	Archive footage	
2008	Jesus Christus Erlöser	Himself	Peter Geyer	Filmed in 1971	

== Television ==
Year	Title	Role	Notes	Ref(s)
1961	Die Kurve	Anton	TV movie	
1963	Die Mondvögel	Valentin	TV movie	
1973	Katohi	Oberst	TV miniseries	
1984	Faerie Tale Theatre	Beast	Episode: "Beauty and the Beast"	
1984	Deadly Nightmares	Kurt Hoffman	Episode: "Lovesounds"	
1987	Timestalkers	Dr. Joseph Cole	TV movie	

== Discography ==
- 1962 Poetry of Friedrich von Schiller: Read in German by Kinski (Folkways Records)

Kinski released nearly 25 spoken word records, some of which were re-released on CDs.

- 2003 Kinski spricht Werke der Weltliteratur (Kinski Speaks Works of World Literature) a box-set of 20 CDs with Kinski's spoken word
  - CD1. Kinski spricht Villon
  - CD2. Kinski spricht Villon und Goethe
  - CD3. Kinski spricht Rimbaud
  - CD4. Kinski spricht Strindberg und Baudelaire
  - CD5. Kinski spricht Schiller
  - CD6. Kinski singt und spricht Brecht
  - CD7. Kinski spricht Hauptmann und Nietzsche
  - CD8. Kinski spricht Büchner und Majakowskij
  - CD9. Kinski spricht Dostojewskij
  - CD10. Kinski spricht Oscar Wilde I
  - CD11. Kinski spricht Oscar Wilde II
  - CD12. Kinski spricht Jack London und Stéphane Mallarmé
  - CD13. Kinski spricht aus der Amerikaballade und der Dichtung afrikanischer Völker
  - CD14+15. Kinski und Ensemble: Shakespeare I Hamlet
  - CD16+17. Kinski und Ensemble: Shakespeare II: Romeo und Julia
  - CD18+19. Kinski und Ensemble: Wiedersehen mit Brideshead
  - Bonus-CD: Sechs Gramm Caratillo/Die Nacht allein
