= Billetdoux =

Billetdoux is a surname. Notable people with the surname include:

- François Billetdoux (1927–1991), French dramatic author and novelist
- Raphaële Billetdoux (born 1951), French novelist
