= Yorgo Voyagis =

Greek actor

- Born: Giorgos Voyagis; 6 December 1945 (age 80); Athens, Greece
- Occupation: Actor
- Years active: 1964–present
- Notable work: 123
- Spouse: Dijana Skorik (m. 2005)
- Children: 2

Yorgo Voyagis (Greek: Γιώργος Βογιατζής, romanized: Giorgos Vogiatzis [ˈʝorɣos voʝaˈd͡zis]; born 6 December 1945) is a Greek actor.

== Career as an actor ==
Voyagis' film debut was in Michael Cacoyannis's Zorba the Greek (1964). He reappeared three years later in the Italian Western Killer Kid.

Voyagis then starred in the film Chronicle of the Years of Fire by Mohammed Lakhdar-Hamina (1975). In The Ballad of Mamluk by Abdelhafidh Bouassida (1982) he played the titular role alongside Bekim Fehmiu and Irene Papas. He also played Joseph alongside Olivia Hussey (Mary) in Franco Zeffirelli's TV Production of Jesus of Nazareth in 1977, in which he powerfully portrayed a strong, yet humble, man.

In the following years, his career was divided between television and film, from one country to another: from the French series X with Capt. Pierre Malet; the film The Little Drummer Girl by George Roy Hill, opposite Diane Keaton an episode of Miami Vice and the movie Julia and Julia by Peter Del Monte, with Kathleen Turner. After a role alongside Klaus Kinski and Harvey Keitel, Voyagis played the kidnapper in Frantic by Roman Polanski. The same year, he appeared in the series The Fortunate Pilgrim by Mario Puzo, with Sophia Loren in dispensing head. The actor found Kinski in Nosferatu in Venice and Venice in Rosso veneziano to Etienne Perier, in 1989, he also appeared in an episode of the American television series China Beach.

He also played in the horror film Vortice mortale and Detective Zaras, Paris Aristeidis hero in a series in 1991.

In 1997, he was Agamemnon in the blockbuster television series The Odyssey, produced by Andrei Konchalovsky, and he participated with Claudia Cardinale and Guy Bedos in Rachida Krim's Under the Feet of Women. Since then, his work has included: a movie of adventure and fantasy directed by Pupi Avati in 2001 (as Raoul Bova, Edward Furlong, Stanislas Merhar and F. Murray Abraham), Swept Away by Guy Ritchie (in the role of the captain) and Without Borders (2010) alongside George Corraface (of Greek origin) and Seymour Cassel.

Yorgo Voyagis remains active in Greece and Italy.

== Filmography ==
Sources:

- 1964: Zorba the Greek (Alexis Zorbas) by Michael Cacoyannis, Pavlo
- 1967: Killer Kid by Leopoldo Savona, Pablo
- 1967: To prosopo tis Medousas by Nikos Koundouros
- 1968: Giarrettiera Colt by Gian Rocco, Carlos
- 1968: Love Problems by Giuliano Biagetti
- 1969: Cuore di mamma by Salvatore Samperi, Carlo
- 1970: The Adventurers by Lewis Gilbert, El Lobo
- 1970: The Last Valley by James Clavell, Pirelli
- 1975: Orlando furioso (TV series) by Luca Ronconi
- 1975: Chronicle of the Years of Fire by Mohammed Lakhdar-Hamina, Ahmed
- 1977: Jesus of Nazareth by Franco Zeffirelli - Joseph
- 1977: The New Monsters (I nuovi mostri) by Mario Monicelli, Dino Risi and Ettore Scola, the terrorist
- 1978: Nero veneziano by Ugo Liberatore, Dan
- 1981: Un'assistente tutta pepe by Nando Cicero, Bel Ami
- 1981: Tutta da scoprire by Giuliano Carnimeo, Nicki
- 1982: La casa stregata by Bruno Corbucci, Omar
- 1982: The Ballad of Mamluk by Abdelhafidh Bouassida, Mamluk
- 1982: Eccezzziunale... veramente by Carlo Vanzina, Slavo
- 1982: Sesso e volentieri by Dino Risi, Lover of Pino
- 1983: Captain X (TV series) by Bruno Gantillon, Ismet
- 1983: O stohos by Nikos Foskolos, Tasos Seretis
- 1984: The Little Drummer Girl by George Roy Hill, Joseph
- 1986: The Boss (TV series) by Silverio Blasi
- 1986: Naso di cane (TV miniseries) by Pasquale Squitieri, Achille Ammirato
- 1987: Nel gorgo del peccato (TV series) by Andrea and Antonio Frazzi
- 1987: Miami Vice (TV series, one episode) created by Anthony Yerkovich, Alexander Dykstra
- 1987: Julia and Julia by Peter Del Monte, Goffredo
- 1988: Grandi cacciatori by Augusto Caminito, Leader
- 1988: Frantic by Roman Polanski, the Kidnapper
- 1988: The Fortunate Pilgrim (TV series) by Stuart Cooper, Tony
- 1988: The Bourne Identity by Roger Young, Carlos
- 1988: Nosferatu in Venice (Nosferatu a Venezia) by Augusto Caminito, Dr. Barneval
- 1989: China Beach (TV series, one episode) created by John Sacret Young and William Broyles Jr., Turner
- 1989: Rosso veneziano by Étienne Périer, Torelli
- 1990: Courage Mountain by Christopher Leitch, Signor Bonelli
- 1991: I agapi tis gatas (TV series) by Andreas Thomopoulos, Detective Zaras
- 1992: L'ispettore Anticrimine (TV series) by Paolo Fondato
- 1993: The Washing Machine by Ruggero Deodato, Yuri Petkov
- 1994: Running Delilah by Richard Franklin, Alec Kasharian
- 1996: Earth indigo (TV Series) by Jean Sagols, Alvarez Corea
- 1997: Jeavaeri (TV Series) by Giorgos Kordelas Antonis
- 1997: The Odyssey (The Odyssey) by Andrei Konchalovsky, Agamemnon
- 1997: Under the feet of women by Rachida Krim, Moncef 1996
- 1999: Guardami by Davide Ferrario, Father of Nina
- 2000: ...Ystera, irthan oi Melisses (TV series) by Kostas Koutsomytis, Stathis Horafas
- 2000: The Prince of Arabia by Peter Deutsch and Karola Meeder, Prinz Mahib
- 2001: The Knights of the Quest by Pupi Avati, Isacco Sathas
- 2001: Beautiful People by Nikos Panayotopoulos
- 2002: Winter by Nina Di Majo, Gustavo
- 2002: Lilly's Story by Robert Manthoulis George
- 2002: Swept Away by Guy Ritchie, Captain
- 2003: Leni (TV series) by Lambis Zaroutiadis Petros
- 2004: Signora by Francesco Laudadio, Basilio
- 2004: Arhipelagos (TV series) by Vasilis Karfis, Manola Stella and Nikos Zapatinas, Stratis
- 2006: An m 'agapas (TV series) by Stratos Markidis
- 2007: Yungermann (TV series, 2 episodes), Ademar From Kresy
- 2009: Without Borders by Nick Gaitatjis, Thanasis
- 2012: The Day of the Siege: September Eleven 1683 by Renzo Martinelli, Abu'l
- 2017: Dove non ho mai abitato by Paolo Franchi
