= Nadia Farès =

French actress (1968–2026)

- Born: 20 December 1968; Marrakesh, Morocco
- Died: 17 April 2026 (aged 57); Paris, France
- Occupation: Actress
- Years active: 1992–2026

Nadia Farès (Arabic نادية فارس) (20 December 1968 – 17 April 2026) was a Moroccan-French actress and singer.

== Biography ==
=== Early life ===
Nadia Farès was born in 1968 in Marrakesh in Morocco, to a Moroccan father and an Armenian mother.

At a young age, she moved to Nice with her parents. To pursue her acting career, she moved to Paris where, at 18, she worked various odd jobs while continuing to audition.

=== Career ===
In 1989, two of her songs were released in the French music scene, "Et Moi J'Veux" and "Rien Ne Vaut La Vie". Farès began her career in television, with Navarro and The Exile, an international co-production by CBS and M6 in 1993.

Farès made her film debut in 1992, with My Wife's Girlfriends. Later, she appeared in the French thriller Elles n'oublient (They Never Forget) in 1994, directed by Christopher Frank. In 1999, she returned to music with two of her songs from the French film Les Grandes Bouches, of which she was a cast member. Following this, she released two songs, "Follow Me" and "Perfection", in the single/EP Follow Me.

She rose to fame with the police thriller The Crimson Rivers. She appeared as Agent Jade Kinler in the 2007 action/thriller War, and as Pia in the 2007 horror film Storm Warning. In 2011, she had an album of ten songs called Momentum.

== Personal life ==
Farès married Los Angeles-based producer Steve Chasman, in 2002. Farès was candid about the brain surgery she underwent in 2007, and the three heart operations in four years. The couple had two daughters and separated in 2022, Farès returned to live in France.

=== Death ===
Funeral of Nadia Farès

On 11 April 2026, Farès was found unresponsive in a Paris gym swimming pool, at the private sports complex of Rue Blanche. A fellow swimmer attempted to revive her by administering CPR. Farès was then transported to Pitié-Salpêtrière Hospital. She was placed into a medically-induced coma, subsequently suffering a cardiac arrest. Farès died on 17 April at the age of 57. In a joint statement, her daughters released details of her death to Agence France-Presse.

== Filmography ==
=== Film ===
- 1992: My Wife's Girlfriends (by Didier Van Cauwelaert) – Béatrice de Mennoux
- 1994: Elles n'oublient jamais (by Christopher Frank) – Angela
- 1995: Policemen (by Giulio Base) – Stella
- 1995: Dis-moi oui... (by Alexandre Arcady) – Florence
- 1996: Men, Women: A User's Manual (by Claude Lelouch) – The new secretary of Blanc
- 1997: Les Démons de Jésus (by Bernie Bonvoisin) – Marie
- 1997: Sous les pieds des femmes (by Rachida Krim) – Fouzia
- 1998: Les Grandes Bouches (by Bernie Bonvoisin) – Esther
- 1999: A Monkey's Tale (Le Château des singes) (by Jean-François Laguionie) – voice of Gina
- 2000: The Crimson Rivers (Les Rivières pourpres) (Mathieu Kassovitz) – Fanny Ferreira
- 2001: Coup franc indirect (by Youcef Hamidi)
- 2002: The Nest (Nid de guêpes) (by Florent Emilio Siri) – Hélène Laborie
- 2002: Le Mal de vivre (by Jean-Michel Pascal) – Sandrine
- 2004: Pour le plaisir (by Dominique Deruddere) – Julie, François' wife
- 2005: L'Ex-femme de ma vie (by Josiane Balasko) – Ariane
- 2007: Insane (by Jamie Blanks)
- 2007: Storm Warning (by Jamie Blanks) – Pia
- 2007: Rogue: L'Ultime Affrontement (War) (by Philip G. Atwell) – Agent Jade Kinler
- 2017: Chacun sa vie et son intime conviction (by Claude Lelouch)
- 2019: Lucky Day (by Roger Avary)
- 2022: On the Line (by Romuald Boulanger) - Sam Dubois
- 2025: Toujours possible – Gaby

=== Television ===
Nadia Farès television credits
Year	Title	Role	Notes	Ref.
1990	Navarro	Sara	Episode: "Fils de périph" (S2.E1)	
1991	The Exile	Jacquie Decaux	6 episodes	
1992	Le Second Voyage	Yasmina	Jean-Jacques Goron (dir)	
1992	Counterstrike	Jeanette	Episode: "No Honour Among Thieves" (S3.E6)	
1995	Le Cavalier des nuages	Melka	Gilles Béhat (dir)	
1996	Flairs ennemis	Karen	Robin Davis (dir)	
2001	L'Enfant de la nuit	Eva	Marian Handwerker (dir)	
2002	Apporte-moi ton amour	Nan	Éric Cantona (dir)	
2006	L'Empire du Tigre	Gabrielle	Gérard Marx (dir)	
2009	Revivre	Emma Elbaz	6 episodes. Haim Bouzaglo (dir)	
2016	Marseille	Vanessa d'Abrantes	14 episodes	
2020	La Promesse	Inès	6 episodes	
2023	Les Siffleurs	Capitaine Marianne Kacem	2 episodes	

== Discography ==
Year	Title	Format
1989	"Et Moi J'Veux" and "Rien Ne Vaut La Vie"	Single/EP
1999	Les Grandes Bouches	Single/EP
2002	Follow Me	Single/EP
2011	Momentum	Album
