= Dis-moi oui =

Dis-moi oui may refer to:

- Dis-moi oui, 1963 song by Johnny Hallyday, French version of We Say Yeah
- Dis-moi oui..., 1995 French film
