= Cold dish =

Cold dish may refer to:

- a meal eaten cold
- The Cold Dish, a book by Craig Johnson nominated to the 2006 Dilys Award

== See also ==
- Vengeance Is a Dish Served Cold, a 1971 Italian Western film directed by Pasquale Squitieri
