= Perihan =

Perihan is a Turkish female name from Persian origin. Perihan is combined of Persian and Turkish words: peri, which literally means fairy and generally refers to a beautiful young woman, and han, which means queen in Turkish.

Perihan may refer to:

- Perihan Benli (born 1942), best known as "Romalı Perihan", Turkish soprano, socialite, painter, model, columnist, and actress
- Perihan Çınar (born 1994), Turkish hockey player
- Perihan Mağden (born 1960), Turkish writer
- Perihan Topaloğlu (born 1987), Turkish handballer
