= Paprika (1991 film) =

Italian film

- Theatrical release poster
- Directed by: Tinto Brass
- Written by: Tinto Brass; Bernardino Zapponi
- Based on: Fanny Hill; 1749 novel by John Cleland
- Produced by: Augusto Caminito
- Starring: Debora Caprioglio; Stéphane Ferrara; Martine Brochard; Stéphane Bonnet
- Cinematography: Silvano Ippoliti
- Music by: Riz Ortolani
- Distributed by: Variety Distribution
- Release date: 13 February 1991
- Running time: 111 minutes
- Country: Italy
- Language: Italian
- Budget: $100,000

Paprika is a 1991 Italian film directed by Tinto Brass, starring Debora Caprioglio in the title role. The film is loosely based on John Cleland's novel Fanny Hill, first published in 1748.

It was remade as an explicit pornographic film by Joe D'Amato in 1995.

== Plot ==
In 1958, on the verge of the Merlin Law that makes brothels illegal, Mimma, a young country girl, comes to town and decides to work as a prostitute in order to help her fiancé get the money to start their own business, and is given the name Paprika at the house of Madame Collette. After her fiancé betrays her, Mimma gives up her original ambitions and decides to pursue a career as a prostitute. In the process, she loses any sense of self-confidence and self-respect, but eventually she finds redemption, wealth, and her one true love.

== Cast ==
- Debora Caprioglio as Paprika
- Stéphane Ferrara as Rocco
- Martine Brochard as Madame Collette
- Stéphane Bonnet as Franco
- Rossana Gavinel as Gina
- Renzo Rinaldi as Count Bastiano
- Nina Soldano as The journalist
- Clara Algranti as Sciura Angelina
- Luciana Cirenei as Donna Olimpia
- John Steiner as Prince Ascanio
- Valentine Demy as Beba
- Luigi Laezza as Nino
- Riccardo Garrone as Paprika's uncle
- Paul Muller as Milvio
- Domiziano Arcangeli as Gualtiero Rosasco

== Production ==
In his autobiography, Tinto Brass revealed he began a sexual affair with actress Debora Caprioglio during filming.

== See also ==
- Italian films of 1991
