= Vampire in Venice =

1988 Italian horror film

- Directed by: Augusto Caminito; Klaus Kinski
- Screenplay by: Augusto Caminito
- Story by: Carlo Alberto Alfieri; Leandro Lucchetti
- Produced by: Augusto Caminito
- Starring: Klaus Kinski; Barbara De Rossi; Yorgo Voyagis; Elvire Audray; Anne Knecht; Giuseppe Mannajuolo; Donald Pleasence; Christopher Plummer
- Cinematography: Antonio Nardi
- Edited by: Claudio Cutry
- Music by: Luigi Ceccarelli
- Production companies: Scena Film Production; Reteitalia S.p.A.
- Distributed by: Medusa
- Release date: 9 September 1988 (Venice Film Festival)
- Running time: (see here)
- Country: Italy
- Languages: Italian; English

Vampire in Venice (Italian: Nosferatu a Venezia), also known as Prince of the Night and Nosferatu in Venice, is a 1988 Italian supernatural horror film directed by Augusto Caminito and an uncredited Klaus Kinski, and starring Kinski, Christopher Plummer, Donald Pleasence, and Barbara De Rossi. The story follows Professor Paris Catalano (Plummer), who travels to Venice following the trail of the last known appearance of Nosferatu (Kinski), who was seen at Carnival in 1786. Catalano learns through a séance that the vampire is seeking eternal death, and tries to put an end to its existence once and for all.

After securing Kinski for the lead of Nosferatu, producer August Caminito planned a sequel to Werner Herzog's Nosferatu the Vampyre. Caminito originally secured Maurizio Lucidi as the director but later felt that film would be better with a more well known director and a higher budget, leading Lucidi to be dropped as the director in favor of Pasquale Squitieri. Squiteri made several changes to the script which did not appeal to Caminito, which led to him paying Squiteri and terminating his contract. This led to further budget cuts in the film and hiring Mario Caiano on as the director. After clashing with Kinski on set, Caiano left the film leading Caminito to direct the film himself. During filming, Kinski would not follow rehearsal and demanded changes in the actors appearing in the film and often had lighting changed dramatically on set. According to second unit director Luigi Cozzi, Kinski's behaviour on set became so erratic that the entire crew left the set and did not return until Kinski apologized for his behaviour.

After six weeks of filming, Caminito came to the conclusion that he did not have the entire film completed, but that he also could not continue with the project. This led to entire sections of the re-written screenplay by Caminito not being shot, and Caminito making do with what he had. The film premiered at the Venice Film Festival on 9 September 1988 and it was later released theatrically in Italy.

== Plot ==
British Professor Paris Catalano travels to Venice to investigate the whereabouts of the infamous vampire Nosferatu, whose last known appearance was during the Carnival of 1786. He is summoned there by the young Princess Helietta Canins, who believes that the vampire may be interred in a sealed tomb in the basement of her ancestral estate. Catalano believes that the vampire is searching for a way to end his immortal torment and actually be dead. Upon his arrival, Catalano notices that Helietta bears a striking resemblance to Nosferatu's long-lost love, Letizia. The Canins hold a séance at the house against the warnings of their Catholic priest, Father Don Alvise. The séance causes Nosferatu to awaken from his 200-year sleep, and escapes from his tomb.

Nosferatu roams Venice, soon locating Helietta's grandmother, Princess Canins, and forces her out of her balcony, pushing her to her death below where she is impaled on an iron fence. During the elder princess's funeral, Catalano warns Helietta that Nosferatu can only be stopped by legitimate love. During a subsequent carnival celebration, Nosferatu stalks Helietta. He soon follows her home, and awakens her in her bed, seducing her. Meanwhile, Helietta's younger sister, Maria, witnesses part of the encounter.

The following morning, Helietta awakens and informs Catalano that Nosferatu has visited her. Later, in an alley, Nosferatu attacks Uta Barneval, the wife of Father Alvise's peer, Dr. Barneval, and chases her into an abandoned building, where he feasts on her blood. Nosferatu later approaches Catalano, Father Alvise, and his peer, Dr. Barneval, inside a castle. Barneval attempts to shoot Nosferatu, but Nosferatu quickly regenerates and proceeds to break Barneval's shotgun. Catalano attempts to repel Nosferatu with his Holy Cross, but Nosferatu burns his hands while holding it before taking Helietta and leaving the castle. Despondent, Catalano packs his bags and leaves the Canins' mansion, announcing that only a pure woman willing to give Nosferatu her true love can destroy him. Subsequently, Catalano, who was dying of an unspecified illness, commits suicide by jumping from a bridge into the Grand Canal.

Maria, who is seeking to fight Nosferatu so she can save her sister's soul, climbs to a tower and jumps to her death in an attempt to catch Nosferatu's attention. Nosferatu saves Maria from the fall and abducts her, taking her with him to an abandoned villa. Nosferatu explains to Maria that he wishes to die, but to do so, a virgin woman has to give herself to him and love him unrepentantly, which Maria accepts. Meanwhile, Barneval, looking for his missing wife, travels to the villa with two friends. In the basement, they find what appears to be Nosferatu asleep in a coffin. When they drive a stake through his heart, however, his appearance morphs to that of Uta Barneval; they have in fact killed Uta, who had shapeshifted to appear as Nosferatu. Upstairs, they locate the real Nosferatu in bed with Maria. Barneval ineffectively shoots him, and the shot goes through Nosferatu's back, severely injuring Maria. Nosferatu, enraged, kills Barneval's friends. While fleeing the villa, Barneval is lured into a garden by Helietta. Posing as Helietta, Nosferatu seduces Barneval before revealing that he had shapeshifted into her, and killing Barneval while showing his true form.

Nosferatu, distraught, leaves the villa with a nude Maria in his arms, walking along a Venice canal. Dying, Maria asks Nosferatu to turn her into a vampire. He apparently refuses, saying that doing so would be an eternal punishment, the same he has endured for centuries. They hold each other while Nosferatu keeps walking, and they eventually disappear in the morning mist, leaving both of their fates a mystery.

== Cast ==
- Klaus Kinski as Nosferatu
- Christopher Plummer as Professor Paris Catalano
- Donald Pleasence as Don Alvise
- Barbara De Rossi as Helietta Canins
- Yorgo Voyagis as Dr. Barneval
- Anne Knecht as Maria Canins
- Elvire Audray as Uta Barneval
- Giuseppe Mannajuolo
- Clara Colosimo as Medium
- Maria Cumani Quasimodo as Princess Canins
- Mickey Knox as Priest

== Production ==
=== Development and pre-production ===
In the mid-1980s, producer Augusto Caminito began producing horror and thriller films in Italy for foreign markets, such as Lucio Fulci's Murder Rock. Caminito was introduced to the script for Nosferatu in Venice by Carlo Alberto Alfieri who had written the screenplay and its original story with Leandro Lucchetti. The script was originally a sequel to Werner Herzog's film Nosferatu the Vampyre with Alfieri securing the star of that film, Klaus Kinski, to headline in this sequel. On December 17, 1985, Caminito and Kinski signed on for a two-film deal: Nosferatu in Venice and Paganini, the latter being a personal project of Kinski that he had been trying to get produced since 1980.

The film was initially to be directed by Maurizio Lucidi. Among the crew was Luigi Cozzi, who was a friend of Alfieri and worked on the set as a consultant and during post-production. Cozzi recounts that Caminito felt the film would be a bigger success with a larger budget and a better-known director. As a consequence, Caminito doubled the film's budget and fired Lucidi, who had only shot a few scenes without Kinski set at the Carnival of Venice in February 1986 . Caminito hired director Pasquale Squitieri and assembled a cast that included Christopher Plummer, Donald Pleasence, Barbara De Rossi, and Yorgo Voyagis. Squitieri re-wrote the script, setting it in the near future of 1996 Venice and hired a number of comic book artists to storyboard the film. Caminito found the storyboard to be "too baroque" and too expensive to film. Squitieri refused to change his script and he had also been arguing with Kinski. As Caminito felt they could not lose Kinski, he terminated the contract with Squitieri and paid him the agreed sum before the director had the chance to shoot anything. This led to the hiring of Mario Caiano, who had worked with Kinski in the past on films such as The Fighting Fists of Shanghai Joe. In mid-1986, Caiano completed casting on the film and Caminito re-wrote the script to make it match the films new reduced budget. Cozzi later stated that several characters and scenes were scrapped in this new re-write.

=== Filming ===
Filming began on August 25. Upon arriving on the set, Kinski refused to don again his Nosferatu the Vampyre make-up, which would have required him to shave his head. As a result, several scenes which had been filmed in long shot, with a double in Nosferatu costume and make-up, had to be scrapped. After arguing with Caiano on the first day of filming, Caiano stated later that Kinski would not listen to him when he called cut and found him the next day locked in his trailer with Caminito. Caiano learned that Caminito had promised Kinski that he would direct the film. According to Caminito, Caiano ran into Kinski's trailer and told him "Now you're directing the movie!". Caminito felt determined to finish the film and took on directing the film himself, with Cozzi who helped him to direct scenes as a second unit director. According to Cozzi, Kinski would ignore the staging they did in rehearsals which led to the director of photography Antonio Nardi having to reset his lighting set-up from scratch as Kinski would not follow cues and would refuse to shoot re-takes. Kinski had Caminito fire Amanda Sandrelli. When Voyagis' girlfriend, Anne Knecht, visited the set, Kinski demanded Caminito hire her as the female lead. This led to the script being changed so that Maria was now Helietta's adopted daughter.

Kinski demanded to and did direct some scenes himself, which included scenes following him as Nosferatu in Venice at dawn. Cozzi stated later that they ended with about 10 hours of footage which consisted of Kinski walking around. The boom man on set, Luciano Muratori, stated that during a scene where Nosferatu was to turn Elvire Audray's character Uta into a vampire which was supposed to be Kinski pretending to lean over and bite her neck led to Kinski inserting his fingers into the woman's vagina, which had her run from the set in tears. Cozzi stated that Kinski went as far as slamming her to the floor and psychically and sexually assaulting her by biting her vagina. Barbara De Rossi also stated in the documentary Kinski in Italy that she was "assaulted one day. He never respected the script and he was always physical when he had something to do with women. [During filming] he grabbed my breasts and he hurt me." and that "It was a mess. We were really scared. We never knew what could have come out of any scene." According to Cozzi, at one point the entire crew abandoned the set in protest of Kinski who later apologized for his behaviour. After six weeks of shooting in Venice, Caminito only had filmed about half the films script set in Venice and had an entire third of the script to film elsewhere. Caminito could not film any further and attempted to compile the film from what footage he had shot.

== Release ==
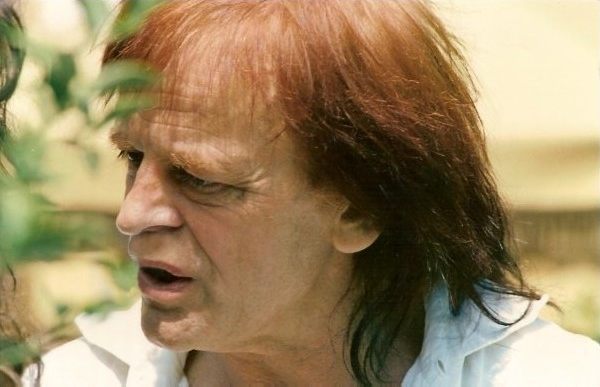
Klaus Kinski in 1988

A day prior to its premiere, Caminito claimed Vampire in Venice to be one hour and forty-six minutes in length. The copy submitted to the ratings board had a 98-minute running time and current home video copies run at 89 minutes. It premiered at midnight on 9 September 1988 at the Venice Film Festival where it was shown out of competition. Cozzi stated that Vampire in Venice's presence at the festival had more to do with Caminito's status as a major film producer and did not have to with the artistic quality of the film. It was distributed theatrically in Italy by Medusa in 1988. Matthew Edwards, author of Klaus Kinski: Beast of Cinema commented on the film's commercial performance in Italy as being "a box-office disaster".

The film was later released in English territories as Prince of the Night in the United States and Nosferatu in Venice. Vampire in Venice was released on home video by the distributor First Fright in 1991. The film was released on DVD in the United States by One-7 Movies as Prince of the Night on September 9, 2014. The film was released on Blu-ray in the United States by Severin Films as Nosferatu in Venice on March 30, 2021, with a running time of 93 minutes.

== Reception ==
From contemporary reviews, a reviewer credited as "Yung." of Variety reviewed the screening at the Venice Film Festival, stating that the film was "more kitsch than horror" while praising Tonino Nardi's camerawork and that Kinski was "particularly memorable".

From retrospective reviews, David Alexander writing in Rue Morgue found the film to be "confusing and scattershot", with "some awkwardly constructed scenes and goofy editing choices, though an overall atmosphere of Gothic dread helps somewhat", and specifically noting Tonino Nardi's "Beautifully hazy cityscapes in Venice". Alexander concluded that the film was "more of a curiosity than anything". Matthew Edwards described the film "difficult to review" noting "its rich atmospheric texture, evocative imagery of Venice and Kinski's wild performance." stating that "Kinski paints his sadistic vampire with a sneering disgust for those around him" as well as noting "a decent performance by Christopher Plummer" and also praised Nardi's cinematography stating he "captures the canals and Gothic architecture to stunning effect." Edwards concluded that the film was a "monumental muddle that has flashes of brilliance but is rendered bereft of any coherency." In his book on Italian gothic horror films of the decade, Roberto Curti stated that Plummer gave the best performance in the film, and the film had a few arresting if repetitive images, stating that Venice "never becomes a living presence in the film (as it does in, say, Don't Look Now)" Curti also stated that "despite the script's ambitions, the dialogue is often poor if not ridiculous" but that it was Kinski who ultimately "drowns the film". Kim Newman reviewed the film in Sight & Sound stating that the film was "a mess [...] but a strangely beautiful mess, with an oddly poetic take on vampirism" Newman noted that characters often die off screen and other characters often enter the plot without explaining who they are or what happens to them.

== See also ==
- Klaus Kinski filmography
- List of horror films of 1988
- List of Italian films of 1988

== Bibliography ==
- Alexander, David (November 2014). "Reissues". Rue Morgue. No. 150. Toronto, Canada: Marrs Media Inc. ISSN 1481-1103.
- Curti, Roberto (2019). Italian Gothic Horror Films, 1980-1989. McFarland & Company. ISBN 978-1476672434.
- Edwards, Matthew (2016). Klaus Kinski, Beast of Cinema: Critical Essays and Fellow Filmmaker Interviews. McFarland & Company. ISBN 978-0786498970.
- Green, William (May 1991). "Vampire in Venice". Sight & Sound. Vol. 1, no. 1. British Film Institute. ISSN 0037-4806.
- Loparco, Stefano (2015). Klaus Kinski. Del Paganini e dei capricci. Piambino: Il Foglio. ISBN 978-8876065866.
- Newman, Kim (June 2021). "Nosferatu in Venice". Sight & Sound. Vol. 31, no. 5. p. 88. ISSN 0037-4806.
- Yung. (1991). Variety's Film Reviews 1987-1988. Vol. 20. R. R. Bowker. There are no page numbers in this book. This entry is found under the header "September 28, 1988". ISBN 0-8352-2667-0.
- Zanotto, Piero (6 October 1986). "Kinski assetatto di sangue "gira" per Venezia". Stampa Sera (in Italian).
