= Sous les pieds des femmes =

- Directed by: Rachida Krim
- Written by: Rachida Krim; Jean-Luc Seigle; Catherine Labruyère-Colas
- Starring: Claudia Cardinale
- Cinematography: Bernard Cavalié
- Music by: Alexandre Desplat
- Release date: 1997
- Language: French

Sous les pieds des femmes (also known as Under Women's Feet) is a 1997 French drama film written and directed by Rachida Krim and starring Claudia Cardinale.

== Cast ==
- Claudia Cardinale as Aya in 1996
- Fejria Deliba as Aya in 1958
- Nadia Farès as Fouzia
- Mohammad Bakri as Amin
- Yorgo Voyagis as Moncef
- Bernadette Lafont as Suzanne
- Samy Naceri as Mohammed
- Éric Atlan as Captain Bertrand
- Roland Bertin as Le Président du tribunal
- Guy Bedos as Le Procureur
- Kader Boukhanef as Mourad
- Safy Boutella as Addellah
- Olivier Brunhes as Jacques
- Arnaud Meunier as Jeannot
- Catherine Samie as La Voisine
