= Jeffrey Meek =

American actor (born 1959)

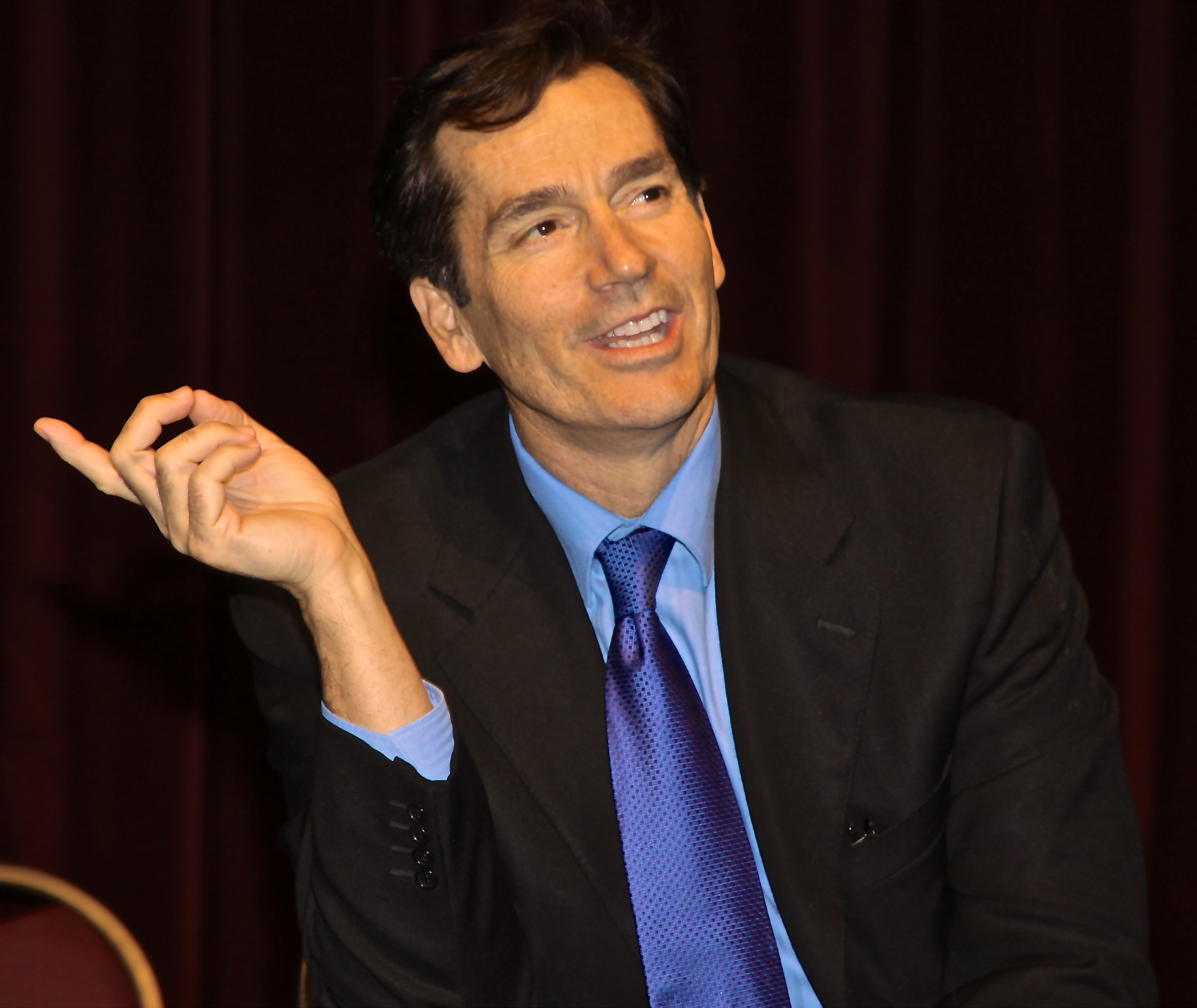
- Jeffrey Meek at PlayFest Santa Barbara in 2015
- Born: February 11, 1959 (age 67); Fairfield, California, United States
- Occupations: Stage, film, television actor
- Years active: 1984-present
- Website: http://www.jeffreymeek.net/

Jeffrey William Meek (born February 11, 1959) is an American actor.

== Early life and education ==
Meek and his family moved often; as a child, Meek lived in Zweibrücken (West Germany), Michigan and San Francisco.

Meek graduated from Arlington High School in Riverside, California, and attended the University of California, Irvine. At the University of California, Irvine he played Hoss in Sam Shepard's The Tooth of Crime, and the title role in Shakespeare's Coriolanus, both directed by Keith Fowler. He has studied acting with Ivanna Chubbuck and Cameron Thor. After graduating from UCI with a Bachelor of Arts degree in Drama, he moved to New York City, after he was offered the role of Quinn McCleary on Search for Tomorrow.

== Acting roles ==
Meek's film acting includes appearing with Denzel Washington and Bob Hoskins in Heart Condition with Mickey Rourke, Morgan Freeman and Forest Whitaker in Johnny Handsome, and with Kurt Russell and Kelly McGillis in Winter People.

His television work includes starring in the episode "Fruit of the Poison Tree" (5x09), of the TV series Miami Vice (1989), and in the CBS series, Raven and the CBS late-night series, The Exile. He also played the dual roles of Raiden and Shao Kahn in the TNT series, Mortal Kombat: Conquest. He played the title role in the 1988 TV adaptation of Remo Williams. He began his TV career playing Quinn McCleary on the daytime series Search for Tomorrow, portrayed Craig Montgomery on As the World Turns, and guest-starred in the A&E series The Glades.

Having performed in over 100 plays and musicals, he played Stanley Kowalski in A Streetcar Named Desire, at the Tony Award-winning, South Coast Repertory Theatre, Jim Morrison, in the Doors musical, Celebration of the Lizard, produced by Doors co-founder and keyboardist, Ray Manzarek, at the San Diego Repertory Theatre and the title role in Shakespeare's Coriolanus. He also played the lead role of Markus, in the west coast première of Rob Ackerman's dark comedy, Table Top, at the Laguna Playhouse and, most recently, starred as Mack the Knife, in San Diego Repertory's production of The Threepenny Opera. He has received two Dramalogue Awards.

He has also been writing for most of his 30-year career. He co-wrote the Bobby Darin biographical film Beyond the Sea, starring Kevin Spacey and Kate Bosworth.

== Personal life ==
During Meek's time in New York, he fronted a rock band, Crime which included Jaco Pastorius, Derf Scratch and John Densmore.

He is an accomplished athlete. In addition to playing basketball and golf, he holds black belt grades in both taekwondo and Aikido.
