= La femme enfant =

1980 film

- Directed by: Raphaële Billetdoux
- Written by: Raphaële Billetdoux
- Produced by: Jean-Claude Fleury; Serge Laski
- Starring: Klaus Kinski
- Cinematography: Alain Derobe
- Edited by: Geneviève Winding
- Music by: Vladimir Cosma
- Distributed by: Gaumont Distribution
- Release date: 9 January 1980
- Running time: 100 minutes
- Countries: France; West Germany
- Language: French

La femme enfant (German: Die Stumme Liebe) is a 1980 French drama film directed by Raphaële Billetdoux and starring Klaus Kinski. It competed in the Un Certain Regard section at the 1980 Cannes Film Festival.

== Cast ==
- Klaus Kinski – Marcel
- Pénélope Palmer – Élisabeth
- Michel Robin – Le père
- Hélène Surgère – La mère
- Ary Aubergé – L'épicier
- Georges Lucas – Le curé

== Production ==
According to Raphaële Billetdoux, the shooting with Klaus Kinski was a nightmare and at one point she had the temptation to stop there, as it was no longer possible to continue. For example, during the bathing scene that Kinski is preparing for the girl, then 14-year-old Pénélope Palmer was already very anxious about shooting a nude scene, even shot in a very modest way. So Billetdoux had reduced the technical team to and set the stage so that Kinski had his back to her (and to the camera), as Palmer was about to enter the bathtub. He then freaked out: "What ?! I turn my back ?! Never ! And then, I want to see her naked ... "

== See also ==
- Klaus Kinski filmography
