= The Exile (TV series) =

American television series

- Genre: Action/Thriller
- Created by: Ronald M. Cohen; Joseph J. Trento
- Starring: Jeffrey Meek; Patrick Floersheim; Nadia Fares; Christian Burgess
- Composer: Michel Rubini
- Country of origin: United States
- Original language: English
- No. of seasons: 1
- No. of episodes: 13

Production
- Production locations: Paris, France
- Running time: 60 minutes
- Production companies: Societe Francaise de Productions; La Cinq; Atlantique Productions; Chesler/Perlmutter Productions

Original release
- Network: CBS
- Release: April 2 – August 20, 1991

The Exile is an American television series that aired on CBS as part of its late night Crimetime After Primetime line up. The series premiered on April 2, 1991 and ran episodes in its first single-season run through October 1991. The series was rerun as part of CBS's Crimetime After Primetime lineup from April 1993 through June 1995.

== Plot ==
The series follows the adventures of John Phillips, an intelligence agent working undercover for the Defense Clandestine Service (DCS) in Eastern Europe, who is framed for murder by a DCS double agent and branded a traitor. With the help of his friends, Charles Cabot, cultural affairs attaché to the U.S. embassy in Paris, and Danny Montreau, a colonel in France's Special Action Directorate, Phillips's death is faked and he is given a new identity as John Stone. As John Stone, he works on covert special assignments while trying to clear his name. In his new life, John also interacts with his pretty landlord, Jacquie Decaux, an artist who runs a garage specializing in exotic cars.

== Cast ==
- Jeffrey Meek as John Stone/Phillips
- Christian Burgess as Charles Cabot
- Patrick Floersheim as Danny Montreau
- Nadia Fares as Jacquie Decaux

== Episodes ==
No.	Title	Directed by	Written by	Original release date
1	"Eclipse"	Unknown	Michael Berlin & Eric Estrin	April 2, 1991
2	"Chasing the Dragon"	Unknown	Story by : Max Jack; Teleplay by : Max Jack, Alan Levy, Ed Redlich	April 9, 1991
3	"Triangles"	Bruno Gantillon	Story by : Michael Berlin, Eric Estrin, David Kemper; Teleplay by : Michael Berlin and Eric Estrin	April 16, 1991
4	"Replay"	Lee H. Katzin	Michael Berlin & Eric Estrin	April 23, 1991
5	"Hit Parade"	Unknown	Unknown	April 30, 1991
6	"Eye of the Beholder"	Unknown	David Kemper	May 7, 1991
7	"Birds of a Feather"	Daniel Vigne	Elizabeth Baxter	May 14, 1991
8	"Dear Life"	Dennis Berry	Alan Levy & Ed Redlich	May 21, 1991
9	"Blueprint for a Perfect Marriage"	Unknown	Peter McCabe	May 28, 1991
10	"Immaculate Deception"	Daniel Moosmann	Martin Brossollet	July 16, 1991
11	"Bad Choices"	Dennis Berry	Kevin Droney	July 23, 1991
12	"The Girl from Brazil"	Dennis Berry	Jean-Vincent Fournier	August 13, 1991
13	"End Game"	Unknown	Garner Simmons	August 20, 1991
