= Tattingers =

- Also known as: Tattinger's; Nick & Hillary
- Genre: Comedy drama
- Created by: Bruce Paltrow; Tom Fontana; John Masius
- Starring: Stephen Collins; Blythe Danner; Patrice Colihan; Chay Lentin; Jessica Prunell; Jerry Stiller; Mary Beth Hurt; Roderick Cook; Zach Grenier; Rob Morrow; Sue Francis Pai; Yusef Bulos; Robert Clohessy; Simon Jones; Chris Elliott; Anna Levine
- Theme music composer: Jonathan Tunick
- Opening theme: "Anybody's Guess" by Brock Walsh (Nick & Hillary run)
- Country of origin: United States
- Original language: English
- No. of seasons: 1
- No. of episodes: Tattingers - 11 (2 unaired) Nick & Hillary - 4 (2 unaired)

Production
- Producers: Bruce Paltrow; Tom Fontana; John Masius
- Running time: 60 minutes/30 minutes
- Production companies: Paltrow Group; MTM Enterprises

Original release
- Network: NBC
- Release: October 26, 1988 – April 26, 1989

Tattingers (later Tattinger's) is an American comedy-drama television series that aired by the NBC television network from October 26, 1988, to April 26, 1989, as part of its 1988 fall lineup. After failing in the Nielsen ratings as an hour-long program, the plot and characters were briefly revived in the spring of 1989 as the half-hour sitcom Nick & Hillary.

An unaired episode, "Screwball," aired on TV Land on April 4, 1999.

== Synopsis ==
Tattingers is the story of a divorced couple, Nick and Hillary Tattinger (Stephen Collins and Blythe Danner), along with their two daughters, Nina and Winnifred. They had remained co-owner partners in a posh Manhattan restaurant until Nick was shot by a drug dealer, which prompted them to sell the restaurant and move to Paris. Their successors, however, proved incapable of properly running the restaurant, so Nick reclaims the restaurant from them to give it another go. Real-life Manhattan celebrities often appear in cameo roles as themselves as Nick's exclusive clientele.

== Cast ==
- Stephen Collins as Nick Tattinger
- Blythe Danner as Hillary Tattinger
- Jerry Stiller as Sid Wilbur
- Roderick Cook as Louis Chatham
- Zach Grenier as Sonny Franks (Tattingers)
- Patrice Colihan as Nina Tattinger
- Chay Lentin as Winnifred Tattinger
- Thomas Quinn as O'Malley (Tattingers)
- Mary Beth Hurt as Sheila Bradley
- Chris Elliott as Spin (Nick & Hillary)

== Episodes ==
No.	Title	Directed by	Written by	Original release date	U.S. viewers (millions)
Tattingers
1	"Pilot"	Bruce Paltrow	Tom Fontana, John Masius, Bruce Paltrow	October 26, 1988	20.5
2	"The Sonny Also Rises"	Mark Tinker	Tom Fontana	November 2, 1988	12.5
3	"Nouvelle York"	Mark Tinker	Tom Fontana, Bruce Paltrow	November 9, 1988	12.2
4	"Virgin Spring"	Allan Arkush	Robert De Laurentiis	November 16, 1988	11.0
5	"Rest in Peas"	Bruce Paltrow	Channing Gibson, John Tinker	November 30, 1988	11.3
6	"Death and Taxis"	Allan Arkush	Channing Gibson, John Tinker	December 7, 1988	9.7
7	"Two Men and a Baby"	Mark Tinker	Robert De Laurentiis	December 14, 1988	11.4
8	"Broken Windows"	Gwen Arner	Noel Behn, Tom Fontana	January 4, 1989	9.9
9	"Wall Street Blues"	Gwen Arner	Peter McCabe	January 11, 1989	10.6
10	"Screwball"	John Whitesell	Tom Fontana, John Masius, Bruce Paltrow	January 25, 1989	N/A
11	"Ex-Appeal"	Michael Fresco	Bruce Paltrow, Deborah R. Baron	Unaired	N/A
Nick & Hillary
12	"Half a Loaf..."	Art Wolff	Tom Fontana, Channing Gibson, John Tinker	April 20, 1989	21.0
13	"El Sid"	Don Scardino	Story by : Tom Fontana & John Tinker; Teleplay by : Channing Gibson	April 26, 1989	13.3
14	"Tour of Doody"	John Whitesell	Tom Fontana, Channing Gibson, John Tinker	Unaired	N/A
15	"Money Matters"	Alan Metzger	Robert De Laurentiis, Tom Fontana, John Masius, Bruce Paltrow	Unaired	N/A

== Reception ==
This program was a ratings failure and was cancelled in January 1989. However, NBC was apparently unwilling to give up totally on the characters or the concept, and the program was revamped into a half-hour sitcom, Nick & Hillary. This new series premiered on April 20, 1989, but proved even less successful than its predecessor and was cancelled after only two episodes.
