= Debora Caprioglio =

Italian actress (born 1968)

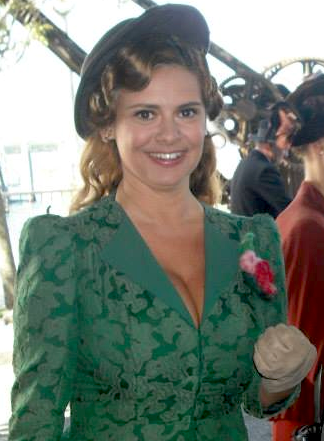
- Deborah Caprioglio in 2013 on the set of the film Il Pretore
- Born: 3 May 1968 (age 58); Mestre, Italy
- Years active: 1988–present
- Spouse: Angelo Maresca (2008–2018)
- Partner: Klaus Kinski (1987–1989)

Debora Caprioglio (Italian pronunciation: [ˈdɛːbora kapriˈɔʎʎo], born 3 May 1968) is an Italian actress. She is known for playing the title character in the 1991 Italian film Paprika by Tinto Brass. In 2007, she took part in the Italian version of the reality show Celebrity Survivor (L'isola dei famosi).

== Early life ==
Debora Caprioglio was born on May 3, 1968, in Mestre, Venice. When she was 17, she won the Un Volto per il Cinema talent competition.

== Career ==
Actor/director Klaus Kinski took notice of Caprioglio and launched her career by casting her in Grandi cacciatori (1988) and then Kinski Paganini (1989). She then starred in the sex drama Paprika (1991) by director Tinto Brass, her breakout role.

Her subsequent film work included The Smile of the Fox (1992), With Closed Eyes (1994), and Samson and Delilah (1996). In 2005, she moved to teleivision, first appearing in the Italian series Provaci ancora prof!.

In 2007, she took part in the Italian reality television series L'isola dei famosi, the Italian version of Celebrity Survivor.

== Personal life ==
Caprioglio identifies as Catholic.

She was in a relationship with Klaus Kinski from 1987 to 1989.

In 2008, she married actor and director Angelo Maresca. They divorced in 2018.

== Selected filmography ==
- Grandi cacciatori (1988)
- Kinski Paganini (1989)
- Paprika (1991)
- The Smile of the Fox (1992)
- With Closed Eyes (1994)
- Love Story with Cramps (1995)
- Samson and Delilah (1996)
- Albergo Roma (1996)
- Provaci ancora prof! (2005, TV series)
- Colpi di fulmine (2012)

== Gallery ==
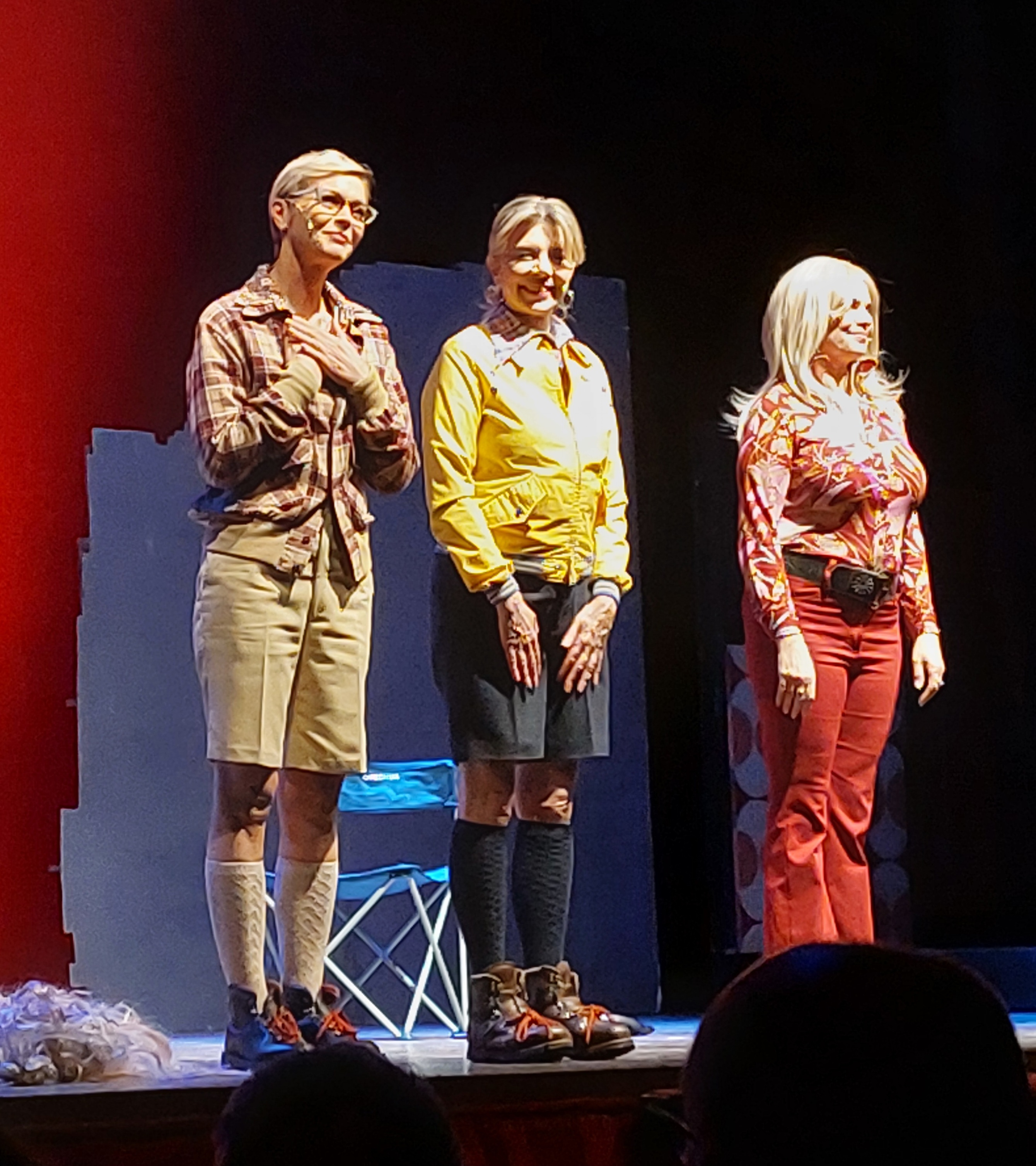
Vittoria Belvedere, Benedicta Boccoli and Debora Caprioglio
Donne in pericolo, Teatro San Domenico, Crema, 1 December 2024
