= Location Africa =

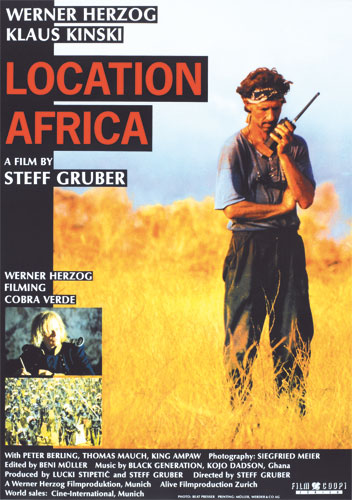
- Theatrical release poster
- Directed by: Steff Gruber
- Written by: Steff Gruber
- Produced by: Steff Gruber; Werner Herzog
- Cinematography: Siegfried Meier
- Edited by: Steff Gruber; Beni Müller
- Music by: Black Generation (Ghana)
- Distributed by: Filmcoopi
- Release date: 1987
- Running time: 65 minutes
- Languages: English; German

Location Africa is a 1987 documentary film by Swiss filmmaker Steff Gruber.

== Overview ==
Cinematographer Rainer Klausmann introduced Steff Gruber to the German film director Werner Herzog in 1985, during the shoot of Gruber's film Fetish & Dreams. In 1987, Herzog invited Gruber to Ghana to document the filming of Herzog's Cobra Verde, which would be the last cooperative project of Herzog and actor Klaus Kinski.

== Festivals ==
- Solothurn Film Festival 1988
- International Istanbul Film Festival 1988
- International Film Festival "Alpinale" Bludenz 1988
