= Fetish & Dreams =

1985 film by Steff Gruber

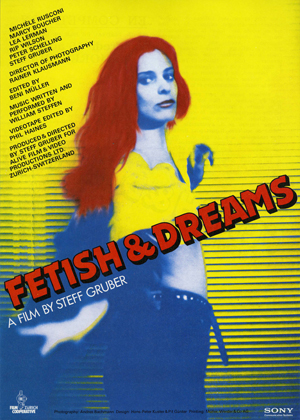
- Theatrical release poster
- Directed by: Steff Gruber
- Written by: Steff Gruber
- Produced by: Steff Gruber
- Starring: Michèle Rusconi; Marcy Boucher; Lea Lerman; Rip Wilson; Peter Schelling; Steff Gruber
- Cinematography: Rainer Klausmann
- Edited by: Steff Gruber; Beni Müller
- Music by: William Steffen
- Distributed by: Filmcoopi
- Release date: 1985
- Running time: 90 minutes
- Country: Switzerland
- Languages: English; Swiss German dialect

Fetish & Dreams is a 1985 film by Swiss filmmaker Steff Gruber. The film premiered at the Film Festival Locarno 1985.

== Synopsis ==
A Swiss filmmaker (S.) and his camera team are working on a documentary film project in New York. They research the theme of loneliness. Twelve million people live in New York City; 7.5 million of them are singles, living alone. An impressive background for the project.

Loneliness is a flourishing industry in New York. Numerous companies and organisations offer their services for singles and those seeking partners. Lea and Marcy for example, two go-ahead ladies, offer courses for singles with the title ‘Fifty ways to meet your lover’. The two of them teach lonely men and women the ‘know-how’, needed to find a partner.

Another company of this kind organizes so-called ‘TV-Production Single Evenings’, where participants learn how to use video techniques. But that is incidental. Top of everyone’s list is finding a partner through the course.

‘Single Date Line’ is another concept – the search for a partner through an answering service. The telephone is everywhere. ‘Pandora’s Box’ is a set-up where lonely men can satisfy their sexual needs – over telephone and against payment of 30 dollars a session.

S. explores it all with journalist thoroughness and records everything on film. Initially distanced, but as time goes by he finds himself more and more involved personally. He cannot get a woman, he saw on the flight to New York, out of his mind. All that he knows is her name, Michéle, and that she studies music in Boston…

His telephone quest does not bring anything and he decides to go to Boston. There he visits all the music schools and puts up posters in the streets. Finally Michéle gets in touch. S. falls in love. The film story meets finally his personal situation. Distance is no longer possible. A few weeks later Michéle visits him in New York. They talk about being in love and their fears for a steady relationship. It is clear that there can be no future together for them.

Shooting is completed, S. returns to Switzerland, to finish the film. He sits in front of the monitor and manipulates a sequence in which Michéle declares her love. S. plays and replays his tapes letting Michéle say over and over again: I love you,…

== Production ==
Like his first long film Moon in Taurus Gruber's second film, Fetish & Dreams, was created in the USA. He started work on it in 1982. Filmed in New York, it constitutes a formal and thematic sequel to the one preceding it. In his second long film Gruber also embarked on new paths in a technical sense. With the help of a method he developed himself, the film was first created electronically on video before being copied subsequently to 35 mm, making it the first video transfer in Swiss cinema. Fetish & Dreams was given its first showing in the Locarno International Film Festival competition, winning the prize for directorial originality in dealing with documentary and feature film elements.

== Festivals ==
- Locarno International Film Festival 1985
- Hof International Film Festival 1985
- Montreal Festival of New Cinema and New Media Montréal 1985
- Solothurn Film Festival 1986
- International Istanbul Filmdays 1988

== Awards ==
- 'Special mention' at the Locarno International Film Festival 1985
- Quality Prize of the Federal Department of the Interior 1985
