= Peter McCabe =

English author and music journalist

- Born: Peter Henry McCabe; November 7, 1945; England
- Died: April 29, 1998 (aged 52); Los Angeles, California, U.S.
- Occupations: Author, Journalist

Peter McCabe (born Peter Henry McCabe; 7 November 1945 – April 1998) was an English author and music journalist, who wrote in a variety of genres. He was an editor at Rolling Stone and Oui magazine, and was the former editor-in-chief of Country Music magazine and a nationally syndicated country music columnist.

== Career ==
McCabe wrote an article in the 28 February 1972 issue of New York magazine in which he alleged financial impropriety on the part of Allen Klein, manager of the Beatles' Apple Corps organisation, with regard to the dispersal of funds raised through US sales of George Harrison's The Concert for Bangladesh live album. The funds were intended for distribution to Bangladeshi refugees via UNICEF yet, according to McCabe, Klein's ABKCO company had withheld an amount of $1.14 per album. Klein responded with a $150 million libel suit, which he later withdrew.

Later in 1972, McCabe's book Apple to the Core: The Unmaking of the Beatles, with co-writer Robert D. Schonfeld, was published by Pocket Books. The book focuses on the business problems that led to the group's break-up and again presented Klein in an unfavourable light. It was subsequently translated into Japanese as ビートルズの不思議な旅 / Bītoruzu no fushigina tabi, and into Dutch as "Apple" tot op het klokhuis; Wat er met de Beatles gebeurde.

In 1984, he and Schonfeld co-authored a work containing interviews with John Lennon, titled John Lennon: For the Record. McCabe also wrote the 1975 book Honkytonk Heroes: A photo album of country music. His most widely known work, with 600 copies in US libraries, is Bad News at Black Rock: The Sell-out of CBS News (1987). He has also written several novels, including Cities of Lies (1993) and Wasteland (1994).

McCabe also wrote episodes for television shows such as Miami Vice and Silk Stalkings.

== Works ==
=== Novels ===
- City of Lies (1993)
- Wasteland (1994)

=== Other Books ===
- Apple to the Core: The Unmaking of the Beatles (1972).
- Honkytonk Heroes: A Photo album of Country Music (1975).
- John Lennon: For the Record (1984)
- Bad News at Black Rock: The Sell-out of CBS News (1987)

=== Articles ===
- "They’re Wrapping It in the Flag", "Rolling Stone", January 21, 1971
- "Mountain Keeps Getting Bigger", Rolling Stone, February 4, 1971
- "The Jersey Pike: A Narco Gauntlet", Rolling Stone, February 4, 1971
- "In the Beginning there was O", Rolling Stone, February 18, 1971
- "School Days: Shooting in the Bathroom, Nodding in the Classroom", Rolling Stone, February 18, 1971
- "Mellow Down Easy in Woodstock", Rolling Stone, March 4, 1971
- "Spiro Dartboards And a Greening", Rolling Stone, March 4, 1971
- "Radio Hanoi Goes Progressive Rock", Rolling Stone, March 18, 1971
- "Melanie Is in a Kind of a Lull", Rolling Stone, April 1, 1971
- "Rock Struggles on in New York", Rolling Stone, May 13, 1971
- "Some Sour Notes from the Bangladesh Concert" New York, February 28, 1972.
- "Charley Pride: 'What We’re Really Talking About is Change", Country Music, December 1972
- "Interview with Johnny Cash", Country Music, May 1973
- "Gov. George Wallace Knows his Country Tunes", Miami Herald, September 15, 1973
- "The Wallace's Are Keeping Country Music In The Family", Country Music, October 1973
- "A Candid Conversation with Merle Haggard, Country Music, February 1974
- "Diana Trask, MOR Country, and that Las Vegas Flash", Country Music, April 1974
- "Charlie Rich: Portrait Of A Late Bloomer, Country Music, June 1974
- "Was the Walking Tall Sheriff Murdered?", Argosy, November 1974
- "Johnny Cash vs Merle Haggard: The Saga of Country Music, Argosy, January 1975
- "Watch This Face: Don Drumm", Country Music, June 1975
- "Radio: Where has all the Music Gone?", Argosy, December 1975
- "Rock", American Home, December 1975
- "It Sounds Like Love", American Home, January 1976
- "Getting It on with the Singles", Argosy, February 1976
- "Music: Rock", American Home, February 1976
- "Don’t Let the Hustle Grind you Down", American Home, April 1976
- "Jazz", American Home, May 1976
- "Is Ronald Reagan for Real?", Argosy, May 1976
- "The Sexing of America", Argosy, May 1976
- "Juke Boxes: Still Hot", American Home, June 1976
- "The Illustrated Body", Gallery, June 1976
- "Great Moments in American Music", American Home, July 1976
- "Music: Redneck Rock", American Home, October 1976
- "Vainty Fair: The Invasion of Mindless Chic", Harper's. August 1977
- "The Sound of Doom", Harper's. February 1978.
- "Disposable Fathers", Penthouse, November 1982
- "John and Yoko", Penthouse, September 1984
- "The Secret Life of Wall Street", Penthouse USA, February 1985
- "The Sellout of CBS News", Playboy, April 1987
- "The Godfather Walks", Playboy, July 1987

=== Television ===
- 1987-89: Miami Vice
- 1989: Tattingers
- 1988: The Equalizer
- 1990: True Blue
- 1990: DEA
- 1991: The Exile
- 1992-94: Silk Stalkings
- 1996: If Looks Could Kill (TV Movie)
