= Eye of the Spider =

1971 film

- Film poster
- Directed by: Roberto Bianchi Montero
- Screenplay by: Luigi Angelo; Fabio De Agostini; Aldo Crudo
- Story by: Roberto Bianchi Montero
- Produced by: Luigi Mondello
- Starring: Klaus Kinski: Antonio Sabàto, Sr.; Van Johnson; Romalı Perihan
- Cinematography: Fausto Rossi
- Edited by: Rolando Salvatori
- Music by: Carlo Savina
- Production company: Luis Film
- Distributed by: Variety Distribution
- Release date: 1 November 1971 (Italy)
- Running time: 92 minutes
- Country: Italy
- Box office: ₤133.333 million

Eye of the Spider (Italian: L'occhio del ragno) is a 1971 Italian crime film directed by Roberto Bianchi Montero and starring Klaus Kinski.

== Cast ==
- Klaus Kinski - Hans Fischer
- Antonio Sabàto - Paul Valéry / Frank Vogel
- Van Johnson - Prof. Orson Krüger
- Romalı Perihan - (as Perihan)
- Lucretia Love - Gloria
- Teodoro Corrà
- Goffredo Unger - (as Fredy Unger)
- Franco Marletta
- Claudio Biava
- Brigitte Brandt
- W. E. Arnold

== Style ==
Despite the title and posters imagery which makes the film sound like a giallo, Italian film historian Roberto Curti referred to the film as a "rather typical film noir"

== Release ==
Eye of the Spider was released on 1 November 1971 in Italy. Due to the growing popularity of and commercial success of the poliziotteschi through the 1970s, the film was re-released as Caso Scorpio: sterminate quelli della calibro 39. The film grossed 133,333,000 Italian lire domestically.

== See also ==
- Klaus Kinski filmography
- List of crime films of the 1970s
- List of Italian films of 1971

== Notes ==
=== References ===
- Curti, Roberto (2013). Italian Crime Filmography, 1968-1980. McFarland. ISBN 978-0786469765.
