= Apple to the Core =

1972 book by Peter McCabe and Robert D. Schonfeld

Apple to the Core: The Unmaking of the Beatles
- Author: Peter McCabe, Robert D. Schonfeld
- Language: English
- Subject: The Beatles, Apple Corps
- Publisher: Pocket Books
- Publication date: 1972
- Publication place: United States
- ISBN: 0-6717-8172-3

Apple to the Core: The Unmaking of the Beatles is a book by Peter McCabe and Robert D. Schonfeld, first published in the United States by Pocket Books in 1972. Released two years after the break-up of the English band the Beatles, the book covers the business aspect of the group's career, particularly the problems that befell their Apple Corps enterprise.

== Book content ==
In February 1972, before the book's publication, McCabe wrote an article for New York magazine in which he accused Apple's business manager, Allen Klein, of withholding funds raised for UNICEF via former Beatle George Harrison's triple live album The Concert for Bangladesh, and for having been responsible for delaying the album's release. The claims led to Klein filing a $150 million libel suit against McCabe and New York in the State Supreme Court, although Klein subsequently withdrew the suit. Apple to the Core similarly presents "a dim view" of Klein, according to author and music critic Chris Ingham, who adds of the book's content: "It takes the view that [the Beatles] were mismanaged from the start; that Brian Epstein, though enthusiastic and gifted, was erratic and effectively out of his depth from the beginning."

McCabe and Schonfeld's book was among the first works dedicated to the Beatles that cast a dispassionate or critical eye on the band. Other such titles included Richard DiLello's account of working at Apple, The Longest Cocktail Party (1972), and musicologist Wilfrid Mellers' study of the group's recordings, Twilight of the Gods: The Beatles in Retrospect (1973).

== Publication and reception ==
Apple to the Core was published by Pocket Books in the United States in 1972. Late that same year, it was published by Brian & O'Keefe in Britain, where it received an unfavourable review in the Times newspaper. In Let It Rock magazine, Phil Hardy wrote that the authors had failed to assemble a convincing or informative narrative and had instead resorted to portraying Epstein as their "hero", at the obvious expense of Klein and the Eastman family. Hardy concluded that the book was "a failure", although he acknowledged that "if only because it sees beyond the stars in most people's skies, with [Michael Wale's] Vox Pop, another flawed book, it marks a hopeful new starting point for rock writing."

Writing in 1977, Beatles biographer Nicholas Schaffner described Apple to the Core as "[a]n irreverent but definitive unraveling of the web of financial intrigue that destroyed the Beatles". In his overview of the most notable books about the band, for Rough Guides, Chris Ingham says that while it has long been out of print, it is a title "worth seeking out".
