= Moon in Taurus =

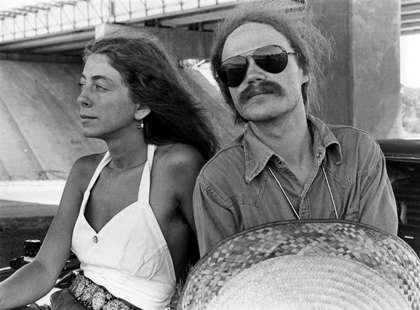
- Directed by: Steff Gruber
- Written by: Steff Gruber
- Produced by: Steff Gruber
- Starring: Wanda Linn Wester; Jack Wright; Steff Gruber; Bonnie T. and the voice of James Herbert
- Cinematography: Andy Humphreys
- Edited by: Steff Gruber; Beni Müller
- Music by: Ruedi Burkhalter (Isaac Albéniz)
- Distributed by: STARFILM (Paramount); Filmcoopi Zurich
- Release date: October 1980
- Running time: 100 minutes
- Country: Switzerland
- Language: English

Moon in Taurus is a 1980 film directed by Swiss filmmaker Steff Gruber.

== Synopsis ==
Moon in Taurus is the story of a Swiss who, after absence of five years, returns to a small town in America where a love affair had come to an abrupt and, for him, unhappy end. Together with his film team, he tries to discover the reasons for the break-up of his relationship. His ex-girlfriend has since married and is in the throes of divorce. Parallel to this, he re-lives his own love relationship to this woman. Following a period of analytical observation, he becomes more and more involved with his own problems.

== Background ==
Moon in Taurus, first feature film by Swiss filmmaker Steff Gruber, is a film made entirely in English and filmed in the U.S. (Athens, Georgia), without a story in the usual sense and with a non-pro cast of four playing themselves.

The three main characters in the film were actually involved in relationships with one another. Gruber, himself, lived with the woman in the movie for more than one year in Europe. The woman returned to Athens and Gruber followed her. He lived there for less than a year before returning to Europe.

There is no rehearsal and there is no pre-planned dialogue. The film records the actual conversations between the three persons and others.

The original version included interviews with Cindy Wilson (The B-52's) and Silver Thin (Andy Warhol Factory); these were however omitted from the final cut. The unconventional form in which the film realised its aims brought it international acclaim. Based on selection from 15 hours of documentary materials, the film linked fiction and documentation in an original way. The film was nominated for an award at the International Filmfestival Mannheim

== Critical reception ==
"Obviously, this is a special film for specialized audiences, talky to be sure, but constantly interesting intelligent and mature."

Variety, 10 September 1980

"Steff Gruber's thorough account of a failed relationship represents a novelty in Swiss film, in its method as well as in its subject. 'Moon in Taurus' does not tell a story but demonstrates how three people try to deal with their his/her story. (…)

Not only do two different languages come together (or rather not come together) in this film, but at least two different appreciations of what talking can do for you. Communication functions on many different levels. Not all the questions are answered. On the other hand, a lot of questions are answered in the film that haven't even been asked. Documentary? Fiction? None of both? 'Moon in Taurus' should be seen first of all as an ethnological study. Not art is its prime concern, no message is revealed."

Film critic Martin Schaub in: Pro Helvetia -Films and Reality- UoSC, USA

== Festivals ==
- International Filmfestival Mannheim 1980
- Locarno International Film Festival 1981
- Solothurn Film Festival 1981
- Cannes Film Festival 1981
- South African Film Festival 1982
