= Grandi cacciatori =

1988 film

- Directed by: Augusto Caminito
- Written by: Augusto Caminito; Antonino Marino
- Produced by: Augusto Caminito
- Starring: Klaus Kinski
- Cinematography: Romano Albani
- Edited by: Nino Baragli
- Release date: 1988
- Running time: 98 minutes
- Country: Italy
- Language: Italian

Grandi cacciatori is a 1988 Italian adventure film directed by Augusto Caminito and starring Klaus Kinski.

== Premise ==
After a man's wife is killed by a panther, his only reason to live becomes revenge, which slowly consumes him.

== Cast ==
- Thomas Attguargarvak as Cacciatore Eschimese
- Roberto Bisacco as Hermann
- Deborah Caprioglio as Deborah
- Brian Cooper as Ufficiale
- Bob Crocket as Cacciatore Norvegese
- Moser Dangwa as Gubai
- Absalom Dhikinya as Shamano
- Nick Duggan as Bracconiere Africano
- Graham Early as Bracconiere Africano
- James Haas as Cacciatore Norvegese
- Roger Heacham
- Michael Hoffmann as Guardia
- Albert Jones as Cacciatore Africano
- Harvey Keitel as Thomas
- Klaus Kinski as Klaus Naginsky
- Steven Ningeok as Cacciatore Eschimese
- Rossahn Peetok as Capo Eschimesi
- Iris Peynado as Nera
- Yorgo Voyagis as Leader
