= Steff Gruber =

Steff Gruber (born 3 April 1953 in Zurich, Switzerland) is a film director, photographer, author, entrepreneur and telecommunications and internet pioneer.

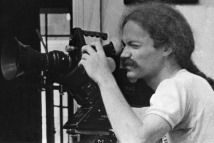
Steff Gruber

== Life ==
Steff Gruber is the son of the painter Hannes Gruber and Annemarie Gruber-Vogelsanger. He grew up in Oberrieden on Lake Zurich. In childhood his greatest ambition was to be a pilot and inventor. He constructed his first radio receiver at the age of eight; when he was fifteen, during the first crewed space flight to the Moon, he succeeded in listening in on the dialogue between the astronauts and ground control. He started to train as an electronics engineer, but abandoned the course before completing it after deciding that he wanted to become a film director.

Up to the present day Steff Gruber has not settled on a choice of career. Instead he combines different professional identities, as an artist, technician and entrepreneur. As a pilot he made round trips in the Swiss Alps, as well as taxi and private flights within Europe till 2022.

== Film ==
Both during and after his time at the Juventus Gymnasium [higher secondary school] in Zurich, from 1972 on Gruber attended film lectures and courses given by Dr Martin Schlappner, Viktor Sidler, Georg Radanowicz and Sebastian C. Schröder at the University of Zurich, ETH Zürich [Swiss Federal Institute of Technology, Zurich] and F+F, Schule für Gestaltung (Zürich) [F+F Zurich College of Design]. During his two-year course at the College of Design he studied with Doris Stauffer, Serge Stauffer, Hansjörg Mattmüller and Peter Jenny. On the side he worked as a commercial photographer and film maker.

In 1974 Gruber studied Mass Media Philosophy for one year at the University of Georgia, where he made the acquaintance of the painter and film director James Herbert. His friendship with Herbert had a lasting effect on him, and remains an influence on his work to the present day.

In the seventies Steff Gruber was one of the first film makers to work in the docudrama genre. He started work on his first long film, the docudrama Moon in Taurus, in Georgia in 1976. It was completed in 1980. The film is thematically focused on codes in relationships and the question why relationships break up. The original version included interviews with Cindy Wilson (The B-52's) and Silver Thin (Andy Warhol Factory); these were however omitted from the final cut. The unconventional form in which the film realised its aims brought it international acclaim. Based on selection from 15 hours of documentary materials, the film linked fiction and documentation in an original way. The film was nominated for an award at the Mannheimer Filmtage [Mannheim Film Festival].

Returning to Switzerland, for a short time he worked as assistant to the American painter Sam Francis, with whom he cooperated on a film about C.G. Jung. As a cameraman he worked for the artist Isa Hesse-Rabinovitch and the film maker Erich Langjahr.

Gruber's second film, Fetish & Dreams, was also created in the USA. He started work on it in 1982. Filmed in New York City, it constitutes a formal and thematic sequel to the one preceding it. In his second long film Gruber also embarked on new paths in a technical sense. With the help of a method he developed himself, the film was first created electronically on video before being copied subsequently to 35 mm, making it the first video transfer in Swiss cinema. Fetish & Dreams was given its first showing in the Locarno International Film Festival competition, winning the prize 'for directorial originality in dealing with documentary and feature film elements'. The film has been shown at various film festivals worldwide. During the work of filming Gruber was introduced by his cameraman Rainer Klausmann to the German film director Werner Herzog. In 1987 the latter invited him to follow the filming work as his film Cobra Verde was created in Ghana. The result was the film Location Africa, which documents the filming work and last cooperative project of Werner Herzog and Klaus Kinski.

Between 1991 and 1995 Gruber was working on a new film, in which he aimed to investigate the erotic codes in interpersonal relationships. But after he had already filmed more than 120 hours' worth of materials, he felt his theme had been overtaken by media developments and so abandoned it. Thirteen years later, Secret Moments was completed after all. Created exclusively from the original film materials, this is a reflection on the project and the reasons for its initial failure.

Gruber's new feature film Fire, Fire, Desire! is a love odyssey in Southeast Asia, which is inspired by Joseph Conrad's short novel Heart of Darkness (1899).

As an author and director Gruber has spent several years working on each of his films – not just because he does practically everything himself, up to and including the design of the film poster, but because he has also been busy on the side with other projects. He has also taught since then at various schools and colleges. From 1994 to 1997, for example, he was a lecturer in Film and Electronic Media at Konstanz University of Applied Sciences.

== Photography ==
Gruber has been involved with the subject of photography since 1970. During his time at the F+F Schule für Gestaltung, he worked not only as a filmmaker but also as a press photographer for Keystone Press. In 1977, Gruber examined new photographic techniques to fuse diapositives with instant images. He called this method diatypie. In his art projects SEXTOX.COM and webdesire.com in the 1990s, Gruber used so-called bots, or fully automated processes, to search the internet for sex images, which then became the subject of his art installations in modified form.

Based on his interest in documentaries, Gruber began shooting photo stories in various countries that focused, in particular, on human interest subjects and humanist concerns. He produced many of his photo series over a period of several years, visiting places and people on repeated occasions. One of his long-term reports is the series about the floating villages of Lake Tonle Sap in Cambodia.

As a publisher, Steff Gruber founded the independent, non-commercial magazine TOX, an open-format platform for photography and other artistic disciplines. The first edition of the magazine was dedicated to the Swiss artist and filmmaker Jürg Hassler, showcasing photographic work produced primarily during his time as a photographic reporter in Switzerland, France and Italy in the 1960s.

Triggered by the COVID-19 pandemic, Gruber founded the Lumiere.Gallery in April 2020 with the aim of offering photographers a platform through digital photo exhibitions.

== Internet ==
Steff Gruber was a hacker of the first hour. As an internet pioneer, he was already surfing through cyberspace when it was still based on government, military and university computers. Through his Cultnet association, founded in 1980 for likeminded internet freaks, he was responsible for the birth of the very first Internet service provider (ISP) in Switzerland. The first ‘Public Internet Dialup’, Cultnet.uucp (which later became cultnet.com and cult.net), was originally a service provided free of charge to registered users. The CULTNET e.V. Communication Society for Art & Science, for example, was aimed at establishing a communication medium for film creators in the form of a culture database. But at the time this digital service met with limited success. Thus for ten years Gruber was practically the only beneficiary of his own internet facility. Cultnet differed from subsequent ISPs in its financing and its aims. It was not focused on profit, and at times was dependent on sponsors. 1989 saw the founding of the firm NETLINK AG. However, it proved impossible to procure the necessary venture capital, because none of the potential investors believed in the vision of a comprehensive global internet. In 1991, 180 people were making use of Cultnet as a platform for the exchange of ideas and information. Steff Gruber's firm Pixxel.com meanwhile created ‘internet identities’ by designing domains with memorable names, while at the same time offering related services. For example, in 1995 the first Swiss search engine was launched in the form of web.ch. Gruber has created and sold internet names like MICROMANIA.COM and LOVEIT.COM. And his sale of another domain in the year 2000 made a considerable media impact. When the software giant Microsoft gave the name Xbox to its new gaming console, it was unaware that the internet name XBOX.COM had been taken by Steff Gruber years ago. Gruber has realised many projects through the sale of internet domains.

Steff Gruber's involvement with the internet extends to artistic projects, like the multimedia installation webdesire.com/project02, shown for the first time in 2001 at the Yellow House in Flims in connection with the exhibition Die Schaukel. Eine Ausstellung zu Erotik [The Swing – an Exhibition in Erotics].

== High frequency technology ==
Steff Gruber was a radio ham in his youth, and continues this hobby. Under the calling signal HB9FXL he operates a short-wave radio station, which he also uses as a laboratory for trials and experiments. Together with other radio amateurs, he founded the WaveFactory association. This interdisciplinary group researches the ionosphere and develops new forms of antennae, serving as an interface between high-tech, art and science. Gruber's expeditions – like that in 2016 to Cambodia, where he also operates a shortwave test transmitter – are part of this work.

Since 2016 he has also been publishing in the radio amateur journal HBradio, where he regularly contributes articles in the ‘Newcomer’ series.

== Companies ==
As long ago as 1973 Steff Gruber founded his first company, Steff Gruber Enterprises. As a graphic artist, film maker and technician, he functioned in multiple roles in creating his first authored films, television advertising spots and industrial films, and designing posters and advertisements.

In 1976 Gruber joined René Grossenbacher to found ALIVE Productions GmbH, today a cultural publicity firm under the name of ALIVE Media AG. The company, which he continues to direct at the present day, is the leading distribution firm for cultural publicity in Zurich. Since 2004 the company has also been a partner and shareholder of Lucerne-based Modul AG, the market leader in this field in Central Switzerland.

In 1995 Gruber set up the Erotic Book Store (EBS) in Zurich. This was the first bookshop in Europe to stock everything erotic in print, ranging from sex education books to theoretical manuals, from belles lettres to picture books. It has been going for ten years, meeting with an enthusiastic response from the media. In 1998 Gruber, together with the auctioneer Peter Simon, opened the Zurich gallery PAGE, Prints and Graphic Editions, a forum for original graphics.

Today Steff Gruber is managing director of ALIVE Media AG, of the film production company KINO.NET AG and of the internet company media.ch AG, as well as a member of the board of directors of the cultural publicity firm Modul AG and President of WaveFactory.

== Photography exhibitions ==
- 2024: State of The World, group exhibition, Gallery 24b, Paris
- 2024: Chania International Photo Festival, group exhibition, Crete
- 2024: Reportage Exhibition, The Glasgow Gallery of Photography, group exhibition
- 2024: Displaced, online exhibition, LUMIERE.GALLERY
- 2023: Chelsea International Photography Competition, Agora Gallery, New York City, USA
- 2023: Porträts auf Augenhöhe, HOCH3, Zurich Witikon, Switzerland
- 2022: photoSchweiz, Zurich, Switzerland
- 2002: Werkschau Bern, group exhibition, Bern, Switzerland
- 2022: 11th Annual International Photography Competition, group exhibition, Florida Museum of Photographic Arts, Tampa, USA
- 2022: HOCH3, Zurich Witikon, Switzerland
- 2022: photoSchweiz, Zurich, Switzerland
- 2022: FOTO WIEN, Café Prückel, Vienna, Austria
- 2021: photoSchweiz, Zurich, Switzerland
- 2021: PORTRAITS – Hellerau Photography Awards, finalists exhibition at the Technische Sammlungen Dresden, Germany
- 2020: New Talents, Collective exhibition, PEP – Photographic Exploration Project, Bpart Berlin, Germany
- 2020: The International Street Photography Exhibition, group exhibition, Glasgow Gallery of Photography, Glasgow, Great Britain
- 2020/21: Cambodian Stills, Online exhibition, LUMIERE.GALLERY
- 2020: Living on Water, Online exhibition, LUMIERE.GALLERY
- 2002: SEXTOX #1 Museum Baviera, Zurich (Lamda-Prints), Switzerland
- 2002: SEXTOX #1 Kunst 2002 Zurich, 8th International Fair for Contemporary Art, Switzerland
- 1977: Zurich artist in the Züspa Halls (Polaroids), Switzerland
- 1972: Zurich artist in the Züspa Halls (photographs), Switzerland

== Photography Awards ==
- 2026: Honorable Mention at the Monovisions Awards
- 2026: Second place at The Artist Gallery Awards
- 2026: Nomination for the Fine Art Photography Awards (FAPA)
- 2025: Honorable Mention at the Annual Photography Awards
- 2025: Honorable Mention at the Chromatic Awards
- 2025: Silver at the NY Photography Awards
- 2025: Bronze at the ND Awards
- 2025: Honorable mention at the PX3 Prix de la Photographie
- 2025: Shortlisted for the “State of the World” Prix de la Photographie in the Asia category
- 2025: Bronze at the FotoSlovo Awards
- 2025: Nomination at the Fine Arts Photography Awards (FAPA)
- 2025: Gold at the Muse Photography Awards
- 2024: Platinum at the European Photography Awards
- 2024: Bronze at the Prix de la Photographie de Paris
- 2024: Honorable Mention at the MonoVisions Awards
- 2024: 3rd place and Honorable Mention at the Best Photography Awards (BPA)
- 2024: Nomination at the Fine Art Photography Awards (FAPA)
- 2024: Platinum and Gold winner at the Muse Awards
- 2023: Honorable Mention at the Annual Photography Awards
- 2023: Gold and Silver winner in the Black and White Photography category at the New York Photography Awards
- 2023: Honorable Mention in the Black & White Photo Contest
- 2023: Nomination at the World Photo Annual 2023 at the refocus Awards
- 2023: 3rd place at the ND Awards in the Photo Essay / Story category
- 2023: Honorable Mention at the International Photo Awards (IPA)
- 2023: Bronze at the Prix de la Photographie de Paris
- 2023: Nomination for the People's Vote Award at the reFocus Awards
- 2023: Honorable Mention at the Monovisions Black & White Photography Awards
- 2023: Honorable mention at the Esperanza Pertusa International Photography Award
- 2023: Winner of the online juried solo exhibition for the month of June of the online magazine All About Photo
- 2023: Gold and silver winner at the Muse Photography Awards
- 2022: Honorable Mention at the Annual Photography Awards (APA)
- 2022: Nomination for the People’s Vote Award at the Black & White Photo Contest by reFocus Awards
- 2022: Bronze at the Tokyo International Foto Awards (TIFA)
- 2022: Honorable Mention at the Budapest International Foto Awards (bifa) in the category Editorial / Press Photo Essay
- 2022: Honorable Mention at the International Photography Awards (IPA) in the category Editorial / Press Photo Essay / Feature Story
- 2022: Shortlist at the PX3 "State of the World" photo contest
- 2022: Bronze at the PX3 Prix de la Photographie Paris in the category Press / Feature Story
- 2022: Honorable Mentions at the Monovisions Photography Awards in the Photojournalism category
- 2022: Shortlisted at the Global Photo Awards (GPA) in the People category
- 2022: Shortlisted at the Helsinki Photo Festival
- 2022: Nomination at the Fine Art Photography Awards (FAPA) in the Photojournalism category
- 2022: Selected to participate in the 4th Annual Chelsea International Photography Competition collective exhibition at the Agora Gallery, New York City
- 2022: Silver Winner at the Muse Photography Awards in the Black & White - Photojournalism and Editorial Photography - Documentary categories
- 2022: Honorable Mention at the Annual Photography Awards in the Photojournalism category
- 2021: Silver Winner at the Tokyo International Foto Awards (Tifa) in the category People - Culture
- 2021: Gold Winner at the New York Photography Awards in the category Black & White - Religion
- 2021: Honorable Mention at the Budapest International Foto Awards (Bifa) in the People - Culture category
- 2021: Honorable Mention at the ND Awards in the Editorial / Documentary category
- 2021: Honorable Mention at the PX3 Prix de la Photographie Paris in the Portraiture / Culture category
- 2021: Gold Winner at the Muse Photography Awards in the Black & White – Photojournalism category
- 2021: Shortlist at the Vienna International Photo Award in the Black & White category
- 2021: Nominations at the Fine Art Photography Awards (FAPA) in the Photojournalism category
- 2021: Nominations at the PHOTO IS LIGHT World Photography Contest
- 2021: Honorable Mention at the Tokyo International Foto Awards in the Editorial-Photo Essay category
- 2020: Honorable Mention at the Monochrome Awards in the Photojournalism category
- 2020: Honorable Mention at the Chromatic Awards in the Photojournalism category
- 2020: Honorable Mention at the Budapest International Foto Awards (Bifa)
- 2020: Winner at the Photography Festival Luminous Frames in the Black and White and Landscapes categories
- 2020: Honorable Mentions at the Monovisions Photography Awards
- 2020: Five nominations at the Fine Art Photography Awards (FAPA) in the Photojournalism categories

== Filmography ==
1972: Portrait (short film, 16mm, s/w, 12 Min.)

1973: Tourist Information (short experimental film, 16mm, black/white, 14 min.)

1980: Moon in Taurus (docudrama, 35mm, colour, 97 min.)

1984: Wo Männer zu erscheinen haben (1-inch-video, 4 min.)

1985: Fetish & Dreams (docudrama, 35mm, colour, 82 min.)

1987: Location Africa (documentary film, 16mm, colour, 65 min.)

2006: Secret Moments (documentary film, DigiBeta, colour & black/white, 82 min.)

2011: Passion Despair (documentary film, DigiBeta, colour & black/white, 95 min.)

2017: Fire Fire Desire (feature film, DCP, colour & black/white, 125 min.)

== Film Awards ==
- 1980: Quality Prize of the Federal Department of the Interior for Moon in Taurus
- 1985: Quality Prize of the Federal Department of the Interior for Fetish & Dreams
- 1985: 'Special mention' at the Locarno International Film Festival for Fetish & Dreams

== Publications of Steff Gruber ==
- Alt und Jung in Asien, publication series, text: Urs Schoettli, Stiftung Vontobel 2021
- Gruber, Steff, ed., TOX. Jürg Hassler, Zurich 2013. ISBN 978-3-9523784-0-3
- Gruber, Steff, Location Africa: Gespräche mit Werner Herzog von Steff Gruber, in: Edition Stemmle, ed., Werner Herzog Cobra Verde - Filmbuch, Schaffhausen 1987: 113–137. ISBN 3-7231-0375-8
- Gruber, Steff, Who ist Steff Gruber HE9GRQ (Mai 1967)?, in: HBradio. Swiss Radio Amateurs, 6/2015: 51–55. ISSN 1662-369X
- Gruber, Steff, Newcomer I, in: HBradio. Swiss Radio Amateurs, 2/2016: 51–55. ISSN 1662-369X
- Gruber, Steff, Newcomer II, in: HBradio. Swiss Radio Amateurs, 3/2016: 49–51. ISSN 1662-369X
- Gruber, Steff, Newcomer III: Propagation – eine Einführung, in: HB radio. Swiss Radio Amateurs, 6/2016: 43–49. ISSN 1662-369X

== Bibliography ==
- Moon in Taurus, in: Cinémathèque suisse, ed., Histoire du cinéma suisse 1966–2000, Tome 1, Lausanne 2007: 383. ISBN 2-88256-178-4
- Fetish & Dreams, in: Cinémathèque suisse, ed., Histoire du cinéma suisse 1966–2000, Tome 1, Lausanne 2007: 594. ISBN 2-88256-178-4
- Location Africa, in: Cinémathèque suisse, ed., Histoire du cinéma suisse 1966–2000, Tome 1, Lausanne 2007: 708. ISBN 2-88256-178-4
- Presser, Beat, ed., Werner Herzog, Berlin 2002: 76–85. ISBN 3-936314-31-4
- Gruber, Steff. Secret Moments, in: Stiftung Schweizerisches Filmzentrum, ed., Schweizer Filme. 1995, Zürich 1995: 34.
- Diodà, Karin / Schindler, Sara: Steff Gruber: "Location Africa". Proseminar Die Eigenwilligkeit des Dokumentarfilms in der Schweiz, University of Zurich, WS 1989/90.
- Elber, Irène / Sahli, Jan / Studinka, Felix: Fetish & Dreams. Steff Gruber. Proseminar Die Eigenwilligkeit des Dokumentarfilms in der Schweiz, University of Zurich, WS 1989/90.
- Gruber Steff: Photo, in: Stiftung Schweizerisches Filmzentrum, ed., Schweizer Filme. 1986, Zürich 1986: 128.
- Badran, Jaqueline, Fetish & Dreams, in: Filmstelle VSETH/VSU, ed., Unmögliche Liebesgeschichten, Zürich 1986: 189–194.
- Fetish & Dreams, in: Stiftung Schweizerisches Filmzentrum, ed., Schweizer Filme. 1985, Zürich 1985: 22f.
- Steff Gruber: Fetish & Dreams, in: Stiftung Schweizerisches Filmzentrum, ed., Schweizer Filme. 1984, Zürich 1984: 24.
- Steff Gruber: Wo Männer zu erscheinen haben, in: Schweizerisches Filmzentrum, ed., Texte zum Schweizer Film. 20 mal Video. Ein Beispiel privater Förderung. Zürich 1984: 60–65. ISBN 3-907850-08-4
- Film Off. Verleihkatalog 1983/84, in: FILMPOOL des Schweizerischen Filmzentrums, ed., Zürich 1983.
- Schaub, Martin, Männersache, in: CINEMA, ed., Die eigenen Angelegenheiten. Themen, Motive, Obsessionen und Träume des neuen Schweizer Films 1963-1983, Zürich 1983: 78.
- Steff Gruber: Fetish and Dream, in: Stiftung Schweizerisches Filmzentrum, ed., Schweizer Filme. 1982, Zürich 1982: 107.
- Steff Gruber: Smara, in: Stiftung Schweizerisches Filmzentrum, ed., Schweizer Filme. 1981, Zürich 1981: 117.
- Schelbert, Corinne, Von einem der auszog die Ursachen zu ergründen. Eine sprunghafte Reise durch Steff Grubers Film "Moon in Taurus", in: CINEMA, ed., Rückgriffe. Neue Schweizer Filme, 1/81: 26–33.
- Moon in Taurus, in: XXIX. Internationale Filmwoche Mannheim 1980. Dokumente - Berichte - Kommentare 1980, ed.: 37, 110, 123, 210, 280, 315, 347, 383.
- Portrait. Steff Gruber, in: Film-Pool des Schweizerischen Filmzentrums, ed., Film CH. Verleihkatalog, Zürich 1980: 50.
- Tourist Information. Steff Gruber, in: Film-Pool des Schweizerischen Filmzentrums, ed., *Film CH. Verleihkatalog, Zürich 1980: 50.
- Steff Gruber: Shady Grove, Triumph der Wölfe, in: Stiftung Schweizerisches Filmzentrum, ed., Schweizer Filme. 1979, Zürich 1979: 42f.
- Steff Gruber. Portrait, in: Schweizerisches Filmzentrum, ed., Schweizer Filmkatalog, Zürich 1974.
- Steff Gruber. Tourist Information, in: Schweizerisches Filmzentrum, ed., Schweizer Filmkatalog, Zürich 1974.
