= Vengeance Is a Dish Served Cold =

1971 film

- Film poster
- Directed by: Pasquale Squitieri
- Written by: Pasquale Squitieri; Monica Venturini
- Starring: Klaus Kinski
- Cinematography: Angelo Lotti
- Edited by: Antonietta Zita
- Music by: Piero Umiliani
- Release date: 13 August 1971
- Running time: 97 minutes
- Country: Italy
- Language: Italian

Vengeance Is a Dish Served Cold (Italian: La vendetta è un piatto che si serve freddo), also known as Death's Dealer, is a 1971 Italian Western film directed by Pasquale Squitieri and starring Klaus Kinski.

== Plot ==
Jeremias was 12 years old when an onslaught on his parents' ranch made him an orphan. He has fought Indians ever since because he considers them responsible for this atrocity. One day, he captures Tune, a young squaw in the wilderness. He brings her to the next city because he plans to sell her as a slave to the highest bidder. Before she is passed on to a buyer, a racist mob tries to lynch her. Jeremias foils this attempt but is taken by surprise later on. Two bandits abduct Tune and leave Jeremias for dead. As soon as he has recovered sufficiently he pursues the misdoers. When he gets them, it turns out they are associated with a so-called friend of his late father. Jeremias discloses that this presumed friend did not only deceive George Bridger, but also his son Jeremias. The murderers of the Bridger family have been his henchman who had been ordered to mask themselves as Indians.

== Cast ==
- Leonard Mann as Jim Bridger
- Ivan Rassimov as Perkins
- Klaus Kinski as Prescott
- Elizabeth Eversfield as Tune
- Steffen Zacharias as Doc
- Salvatore Billa as Ted
- Teodoro Corrà as Boon
- Giorgio Dolfin
- Enzo Fiermonte as George Bridger, Jim's father
- Isabella Guidotti
- Stefano Oppedisano
- Gianfranco Tamborra
- Pietro Torrisi as Roy
- Yotanka

== See also ==
- Klaus Kinski filmography
