= François Billetdoux =

French writer (1927–1991)

François Billetdoux (7 September 1927 – 26 November 1991) was a French dramatic author and novelist.

== Biography ==
His works describe the world with a fierce humor of a somewhat burlesque style, which sometimes turns into black humor.

Billetdoux was born in and died in Paris. He was President of the Société des gens de lettres in 1972. His daughter, Raphaële Billetdoux is also a writer.

In 1989 he was awarded the Grand Prix du Théâtre de l’Académie Française.

== Plays ==
- À la nuit la nuit (1955)
  - Night in the night, Jelm Mountain Publishers, 1980, ISBN 978-0-936204-09-3
- Le comportement des époux Bredburry (1955)
- Tchin-Tchin (1959) translated into English by Willis Hall 1960 retitled Chin-Chin
- Va donc chez Thorpe (1961)
- Comment va le monde, Môssieu ? Il tourne, Môssieu (1964)
- Il faut passer par les nuages (1966)
- Silence, l'arbre remue encore (1967)
- Femmes Parallèles (1970)
- Rintru pa trou tar, hin (1971)
- Les Veuves (1972)
- La Nostalgie, camarade (1974)
- Ai-je dit que je suis bossu (1980)
- Réveille-toi, Philadelphie (1988)

== Novels ==
- L'Animal (1955)
- Royal garden blues (1957)
- Brouillon d'un bourgeois (1961) (translated into English by Ralph Manheim as "A Man and His Master," published by Secker & Warburg in 1963)
