= Dis-moi oui... =

1995 film by Alexandre Arcady

- Theatrical release poster
- Directed by: Alexandre Arcady
- Written by: Alexandre Arcady; Olivier Dazat; Antoine Lacomblez
- Produced by: Alexandre Arcady
- Starring: Jean-Hugues Anglade; Claude Rich; Nadia Farès; Patrick Braoudé; Julia Maraval; Marie Laforêt; Valérie Kaprisky; Anouk Aimée
- Cinematography: Robert Alazraki
- Edited by: Martine Giordano
- Music by: Philippe Sarde
- Production companies: New Light Films; TF1 Films Production; SGGC; Jiby Productions
- Distributed by: UGC
- Release date: 19 April 1995 (France)
- Running time: 107 minutes
- Country: France
- Language: French

Dis-moi oui... (lit. 'Tell Me Yes...') is a 1995 French romantic comedy-drama film co-written and directed by Alexandre Arcady.

== Cast ==
- Jean-Hugues Anglade as Stéphane Villiers
- Julia Maraval as Eva Castillo
- Nadia Farès as Florence
- Claude Rich as Professor Villiers
- Valérie Kaprisky as Nathalie
- Patrick Braoudé as Brice
- Jean-François Stévenin as Dr. Arnaud
- Anouk Aimée as Claire Charvet
