= Paganini (1989 film) =

Kinski Paganini
- Theatrical release poster
- Directed by: Klaus Kinski
- Written by: Klaus Kinski
- Produced by: Augusto Caminito
- Starring: Klaus Kinski; Debora Kinski; Nikolai Kinski; Dalila Di Lazzaro; André Thorent; Eva Grimaldi; Marcel Marceau; Donatella Rettore; Bernard Blier
- Cinematography: Pier Luigi Santi
- Edited by: Klaus Kinski
- Music by: Niccolò Paganini; Salvatore Accardo
- Production companies: Scena Film Production; Reteitalia; Président Films
- Distributed by: Medusa Distribuzione
- Release date: 7 October 1989 (Germany)
- Running time: 81 minutes
- Countries: Italy; France
- Language: Italian

Kinski Paganini, also known simply as Paganini, is a 1989 biographical film written, directed by and starring Klaus Kinski. Based on the life and career of composer and virtuoso violinist Niccolò Paganini, it was Kinski's only film as director as well as his final acting appearance before his death in 1991.

Kinski felt that he and Paganini had led similar lives, and both gave "demonic" performances in their own fields that often sparked great controversy.

== Plot ==
A biopic about the life of Niccolò Paganini, who many consider to be one of the greatest violinists who ever lived.

== Cast ==
- Klaus Kinski as Niccolò Paganini
- Debora Caprioglio (credited as Debora Kinski) as Antonia Bianchi
- Nicolai Kinski as Achille Paganini
- Dalila Di Lazzaro as Helene von Feuerbach
- André Thorent as Galvano
- Eva Grimaldi as Maria Anna Elisa Bonaparte
- Marcel Marceau as Pantomime
- Donatella Rettore as Miss Wells
- Bernard Blier as Father Caffarelli
- Beba Balteano as Carol Watson
- Fabio Carfora as Mr. Watson
- Feodor Chaliapin Jr. as Judge
- Tosca D'Aquino as Angiolina Cavanna

== Production ==
In his 1999 documentary My Best Fiend, frequent collaborator Werner Herzog explains that Kinski repeatedly asked him to direct the film, but Herzog refused because he thought the script was "unfilmable". Herzog also states that the preparation for his role in Kinski Paganini caused the actor to take on an uncomfortable "alien" air that disrupted Kinski's performance in their last film together, Cobra Verde.

Tosca D'Aquino recalled with shock her experience in the film: "I suffered the harassment of Kinski's very difficult nature. Going back I would not make this film because I suffered a lot. He was a very violent man. I had a complicated relationship, he was bossy, I had bruises." In his autobiography, Kinski, describing one of these scenes with D'Aquino, wrote, "She was embarrassed and closed her legs. I had to block them violently. When I penetrated her with my fingers, she squirmed and moaned."

== Home media ==
Since its theatrical run, the film had only been released on DVD and VHS in Germany, but in late 2011, the film was released for the first time in North America on a two disc special edition DVD. The release contained deleted and extended scenes, Cannes Film Festival interviews, and a director's cut (95 minutes). In April 2024, it was released on Blu-ray for the first time by Vinegar Syndrome sublabel Vinegar Syndrome Labs.
