= Romalı Perihan =

Turkish socialite

Perihan Özkurt
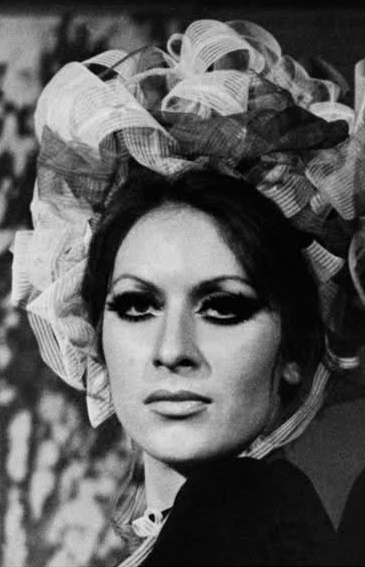
- Perihan during a cabaret performance
- Born: Perihan Benli; 18 March 1942; Rome, Kingdom of Italy
- Died: 5 May 2016 (aged 74)
- Other names: Perihan Esfandiari-Bakhtiari; La Bella Turca; Princess Soprano
- Citizenship: Republic of Turkey
- Education: Performing arts, psychology
- Alma mater: Accademia Nazionale di Arte Drammatica Silvio D'Amico
- Occupations: Actress, performance artist, model, columnist, painter, singer
- Years active: 1950s–2016
- Spouse(s): Prince Bijan Esfandiari (7 years); Erdem Mısırlı (until 1977); B. Bensan (14 years)
- Website: romaliperihan.net

Perihan Özkurt (born Perihan Benli; 18 March 1942 – 5 May 2016), best known as Romalı Perihan, formerly Perihan, Princess of Esfandiari-Bakhtiari, was an internationally known Turkish soprano, socialite, painter, model, columnist, and actress who was married to the late Iranian nobleman Bijan, Prince of Esfandiari-Bakhtiari in Italy.

Born and raised in Rome, Italy, Romalı Perihan was the sister-in-law of Her Majesty The Queen Soraya. She was once nicknamed "La Bella Turca" and "La Turca Romana" by the Italian media and was often referred to as Princess Romalı Perihan or Princess Soprano. Before pursuing a career as a singer at the age of seventeen, she briefly attended the Accademia Nazionale di Arte Drammatica Silvio D'Amico. She became one of the leading figures in European high society. Fluent in Italian and Turkish, Romalı Perihan spoke five languages.

Romalı Perihan was the Honorary President of the Cultural Foundation of Poets Ashiks and Writers (Turkish: Şair Ozan ve Yazarlar Kültür Derneği). She acted in multilingual cinema chiefly from 1960 to 1982, doing several films in Italian with renowned director Federico Fellini, for whom she was a favourite subject. She is known as the only Turk to appear in a Fellini film. She also acted in films directed by such well-known artists as Antonio Margheriti, Dino De Laurentiis, Remzi Aydın Jöntürk, Roberto Bianchi Montero, Sergei Bondarchuk, Yılmaz Güney, and Zeki Alasya.

She should not be confused, as often happens, with the homonymous artists Peri-Han who was famous for her vamp roles and Perihan Tamer, a famous belly dancer. That is actually why Zeki Müren created the nickname "Romalı Perihan" (Turkish: Perihan of Rome), referring to Perihan's hometown, Rome. However, in the European media Romalı Perihan was sometimes credited as Peri-Han, Peri Han, and Pery Han.

She died aged 74 in Istanbul on 5 May 2016. Özkurt was interred at Ayazağa Cemetery following the religious funeral service held at Bebek Mosque on 7 May.

== Early life and career ==
Romalı Perihan was born Perihan Benli to well-educated Turkish parents in Rome, Italy. Her mother, whose roots trace back to Rumelia, was an alumna of Boğaziçi University. Her maternal uncle was an admiral. Her father was from Bursa. She had two siblings.

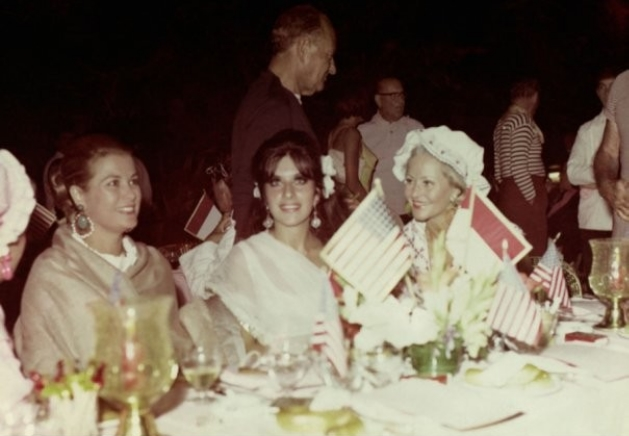
Left to Right: American-Monégasque Grace Kelly, Her Serene Highness The Princess of Monaco, Turkish Perihan, Her Highness The Princess of Esfandiari-Bakhtiari, and German Rosemarie Kanzler who was one of the world's richest women, in Monte Carlo.

When she was fourteen years old, she appeared for the first time on film, as the daughter of the protagonist in an Egyptian film shot in Cairo where she met Omar Sharif. Her manager then was Valentina Sturra. Two years later, she married the 33-year-old Bijan, Prince Esfandiari-Bakhtiari (15 October 1937, Isfahan – 29 October 2001, Paris) who was the second and youngest child of Prince Khalil Khan Esfandiary (1901–1983), a Bakhtiari nobleman and Iranian ambassador to West Germany in the 1950s, and his Russian-born German wife Princess Eva "Evchen" Karl (1906–1994), and younger brother of Soraya Esfandiari-Bakhtiari, second wife of Mohammad Reza Pahlavi, Shah of Iran.

As a result of her polyglotism and eclectic, wide-ranging repertoire of contemporary and narrative songs in Italian and Turkish, Perihan, in her mid-twenties, performed periodically as a soloist in Asım İslamoğlu and Fahrettin Aslan's several different luxurious locations featuring Turkey's most prominent artists, including Zeki Müren. During this period, Magali Noël was amongst the singers to join her on stage. In 2000s, Romalı Perihan also performed in notable clubs such as Cahide and Halikarnas. She also gave a concert in Supper Club, Ortaköy. Staged in support of her classical LP recordings and comprising a set list of songs from that and some other albums, she wore a US$27,000 costume called "Khurram Sultana" (surrounded by a double row of 72 black pearls from Singapore) during the event.

She had many uncredited roles for the first several years of her Cinecittà career. Her first role in Italia was in 1960's La dolce vita, and she would be featured in several movies into the 1950s; of these films, the most notable being Waterloo in 1970.

In the late 1970s, she was known for singing arrangements, most notably "O Bendim O" which is a cover of the Pierre Bachelet song "Histoire d'O". Turkish lyrics were written by Ülkü Aker. Produced by Nino Varon and arranged by Onno Tunç, "O Bendim O" was released through Kervan Plakçılık, in association with Nova Stereo, in 1976. Her LP Romalı Perihan'ın Arabesk Dünyası was released by Polat Tezel and was a commercial success.

In 1978, she was cast in the film Kaplanlar Ağlamaz, in which she shared the leading role with Cüneyt Arkın.

Romalı Perihan's second husband was Erdem Mısırlı, Turkish businessman and founder of the Mısırlı Triko brand.

In 1990, Federico Fellini wanted her cast in the leading role in his then-upcoming film La voce della luna; however, she regretfully refused since she was busy with wedding preparations in Germany. Her third and last husband was B. Bensan, who was a German engineer of Mercedes-Benz. The couple lived in Stuttgart, Baden-Württemberg, Germany, and their marriage lasted fourteen years.

Romalı Perihan was a very close friend of Ülkü Adatepe, one of the eight adopted children of Mustafa Kemal Atatürk who is the founder of the Republic of Turkey. Adatepe died in 2012. Among Perihan's close companions were Erol Simavi, Geraldine Chaplin, Sakıp Sabancı, Novella Parigini, and Yılmaz Güney.

== Interviews ==
In an interview, Perihan Özkurt reveals more about her private and professional life, and how her experiences shaped her life. She gave this interview towards the end of her life while she was residing in Turkey.

A summary of what she talks about in this interview is as follows:

Her Turkish parents lived in Rome, and were in the high society. So, Romali Perihan was born and raised in Rome. She mentions that she blended in very well and was seen no different than an Italian because her looks weren’t too distinguishable and she spoke fluent Italian as her first language. She also had been accustomed to the Italian way of living as she spent her entire childhood there.

Romali Perihan attended acting schools and started taking roles in movies. She worked with the famous Italian director Federico Fellini, and she’s actually known to be the only Turkish person to have worked with him.

At the age of 16, she married the Iranian prince; the prince's sister was a close connection of her mother's. During the course of her acting career, however, she never disclosed her marriage. She states she kept it private because she didn't want to be known by who her husband or her parents were, but rather by her own accomplishments as an actress. Further, she knew that her friends and co-workers weren't as privileged and were struggling in the industry, so she did not want to vaunt. Romali Perihan still came to be nicknamed a princess, however, after she played some roles as a princess. She jokes in the interview about how the crown is always there somehow.

Diving more into her private life, she reveals that her marriage to the Prince was short-lived; she ended up getting a divorce when the Prince and his sister took her to get an abortion without Perihan's knowledge or consent. She was never able to have children after that operation, due to surgical error.

Perihan spoke fluent Turkish and Italian, and she knew five languages in total. The Italian media was referring to her as ‘la Bella Turca,’ or "the pretty Turk". Meanwhile in Turkey, she was known as Perihan of Rome. Undoubtedly, this is a reflection of the cultural confusion and identity problem that most multi-cultural people are inevitably subject to.

She tells the interviewer that she had four marriages in total over her lifetime and lived a glamorous socialite life overall. After her acting career came to an end, she took voice lessons and got an opera education, impressively when she was already past the age of 40. Then she successfully became a soprano singer.

Perihan recounts that she felt the most sense of belonging in Turkey. Thus, she moved to Turkey and spent the last decades of her life there until her death.

== Discography ==
=== LP recordings ===
- O Bendim O: O'nun Hikâyesi (Nova Stereo, 1976) (writer(s), Pierre Bachelet, Ülkü Aker)
- Görünce Seni (writer (s), Consuelo Velázquez, et al.)
- Nerden Nereye (writer (s), Las Grecas, et al.)
- Vay Başıma Gelenler (writer (s), Robert "Bob" Marcucci, Peter de Angelis, et al.)
- Romalı Perihan'ın Arabesk Dünyası
  - "Gitme Sana Muhtacım"
  - "Senin Olmaya Geldim"

=== Compilations featuring Romalı Perihan ===
- Bir Zamanlar 4... (Ossi Music, 2008) (With the song "Histoire d'O")

== Filmography ==
=== Film and television ===
Year	Title	Role	Notes
1960	La dolce vita		Film
1969	Fellini Satyricon	Goddess	Film
1970	Waterloo		Film
1971	Web of the Spider		Film
1971	Eye of the Spider		Film
1973	Il magnate		Film
1975	Kaygısızlar		Film
1978	Kaplanlar Ağlamaz	Perihan	Film
1980	Akıllı Deliler		Film
1982	Elveda Dostum		Film
1989	Hiçbir Gece	Suna	Film

=== Special guest appearances ===
Year	Title	Role	Notes
1974	Parasızlar	Herself singing "Parla più piano"	Film

== Awards and nominations ==
Year	Award	Category	Result	Reference
1976	Hey Magazine Awards	Most Promising Female Singer of the Year (voted by readers)	Nominated	
