= Raphaële Billetdoux =

French novelist (born 1951)

Raphaële Billetdoux (born 28 February 1951 in Paris) is a French novelist.

== Biography ==
She is the daughter of François Billetdoux, and was a companion of the political journalist Paul Guilbert (died July 2002).

She was an assistant editor on feature films and television. Then in 1975, she became a journalist. She made a feature film, La Femme enfant (1980). In 2006, she wrote a memoir, Un peu de désir, sinon je meurs, under the name "Marie" Billetdoux.

== Awards ==
- Bourse de la Fondation del Duca, for Jeune fille en silence.
- 1974 Prix Louise de Vilmorin and Prix Contrepoint, for L'Ouverture des bras de l'homme
- 1976 Prix Interallié, for Prends garde à la douceur des choses
- 1985 Prix Renaudot, for Mes nuits sont plus belles que vos jours

== Works ==
- Jeune fille en silence, Éditions du Seuil, Paris, 1971; Seuil, 2007, ISBN 978-2-02-096713-6
- L'Ouverture des bras de l'homme, Éditions du Seuil, Paris, 1973; Seuil, 2006, ISBN 978-2-02-087338-3
- Prends garde à la douceur des choses, Éditions du Seuil, ISBN 2-02-004491-9
- Lettre d'excuse, Éditions du Seuil, Paris, 1981, ISBN 2-02-005958-4
- Mes nuits sont plus belles que vos jours, Grasset, Paris, 1985, ISBN 2-246-33381-4
  - Night without day, Viking, 1987, ISBN 978-0-670-81301-8
- Entrez et fermez la porte, Grasset, Paris, 1991, ISBN 2-246-43551-X
- Mélanie dans un vent terrible, Grasset, Paris, 1994, ISBN 2-246-47781-6
- Chère madame ma fille cadette, Grasset, Paris, 1997, ISBN 2-246-54781-4
- Je frémis en le racontant: horresco referens, Plon, Paris, 2000, ISBN 2-259-19219-X
- De l'air, Albin Michel, Paris, 2001, ISBN 2-226-12654-6
- Un peu de désir sinon je meurs, Albin Michel, Paris, 2006, ISBN 2-226-17237-8
- C'est fou, une fille..., Albin Michel, Paris, 2007, ISBN 978-2-226-18097-1
- C'est encore moi qui vous écris, Stock, Paris, 2010, ISBN 978-2-234-06314-3
