= Rachida Krim =

French filmmaker (born 1955)

Rachida Krim (born February 17, 1955) is a French filmmaker and visual artist of Algerian descent.

== Life ==
Rachida Krim was born in Alès, southern France, to parents from Western Algeria who were "rank and file members" of the National Liberation Front. She studied painting and had several exhibitions after her graduation. She began working in film in 1988 as a scriptwriter and in other capacities. In 1992 she traveled to Algeria to make her first film, El Fatha. Her film Sous les pieds des femmes examined personal memories of the Algerian War.

== Awards ==
- 1997 Winner of CICAE Award at the Namur International Festival of French-Speaking Film for Sous les pieds des femmes
- 1998 Winner of Prix SACD at Avignon Film Festival for Sous les pieds des femmes
- 2003 Winner of Screenplay Creation Fonds at Amiens International Film Festival, shared with Irène Jouannet for Presque tout sur mon père
- 2003 winner of TV/Video Competition Award at Ouagadougou Panafrican Film and Television Festival for Houria for Best Series or Sitcom

== Works ==
=== Films ===
- El Fatha [The Feast], short film, 1992
- Sous les pieds des femmes [Beneath the Feet of the Women], 1997
- Imra`a safira / La Femme dévoilée [The Unveiled Woman], 1998

=== Television ===
- Houria, 5 part TV series about issues of sexuality and AIDS, 2002
- Pas si simple [Not That Simple], 2009
- Permis d'aimer [License to Love], TV movie, 2005
