= Augusto Caminito =

Italian film director (1939–2020)

- Born: 1 July 1939; Naples, Kingdom of Italy
- Died: 23 August 2020 (aged 81); Naples, Italy
- Occupation: Film director

Augusto Caminito (1 July 1939 – 23 August 2020) was an Italian film director, screenwriter, and producer.

== Filmography ==
=== Screenwriter ===
- Halleluja for Django (1967)
- The Ruthless Four (1968)
- The Vatican Affair (1968)
- Trop jolies pour être honnêtes (1972)
- The Great Kidnapping (1973)
- Brothers Blue (1973)
- The Cat (1977)
- The Witness (1978)
- I Know That You Know That I Know (1982)

=== Director ===
- Grandi cacciatori (1988)
- Vampire in Venice (1988)

=== Producer ===
- Ne parliamo Lunedì (1990)
