= Luigi Maria Burruano =

Italian actor (1948–2017)

- Born: 20 October 1948; Palermo, Italy
- Died: 10 September 2017 (aged 68); Palermo, Italy
- Occupation: Actor
- Years active: 1970–2017
- Height: 1.72 m (5 ft 8 in)

Luigi Maria Burruano (20 October 1948 – 10 September 2017 in Palermo) was an Italian film, stage and television actor. He began his career in Sicilian-language cabaret and theatre before turning his attention to films.

== Life and career ==
Born in Palermo, the son of a doctor, Burruano made his acting debut in a local amateur company. He got a large local success playing Rancu Tanu in the comedy play Palermo oh cara and got his national breakout appearing in the eighth season of the TV-series La piovra.

A follower of the Stanislavski's system, he was specialized in playing Sicilian working-class characters. In 2001 he was nominated for Nastro d'Argento for best supporting actor thanks to his performance in Marco Tullio Giordana's One Hundred Steps. For his performance in The Return of Cagliostro and in Break Free he received a special mention from the Pasinetti Award jury at the 2003 Venice Film Festival. In 2006 he was arrested on charges of stabbing his daughter's divorced husband, who did not pay alimony to his daughter nor pay child support.

Burruano died after a long illness on 10 September 2017, at the age of 68. He was the uncle of actor Luigi Lo Cascio.

== Roles ==
=== Stage ===
Plays in which Burruano appeared include:

- I giganti della montagna
- Coriolano
- La saga del signore della nave
- Il giardino di inverno
- La coltellata
- Pulcinella
- Studio per una finestra
- Ohi Bambulè!
- L'aquila deve volare
- Rudens
- Sticus
- Palermo, oh cara

=== Filmography ===
- L'amore coniugale (1970, directed by Dacia Maraini)
- Pizza Connection (1985, directed by Damiano Damiani) - Detective
- ZEN – Zona Espansione Nord (1988, directed by Gian Vittorio Baldi) - Totò
- Forever Mery (1989, directed by Marco Risi) – Cliente Mery
- Boys on the Outside (1990, directed by Marco Risi) – Franco D'Annino
- Acla's Descent into Floristella (1992, directed by Aurelio Grimaldi) – Il padre di Aclà
- The Escort (1993, directed by Ricky Tognazzi) – Informer
- Quattro bravi ragazzi (1993, directed by Claudio Camarca) – Renè's Father
- Nel continente nero (1993, directed by Marco Risi) – Domenico Spatola
- The Whores (1994, directed by Aurelio Grimaldi) – Mario
- S.P.Q.R.: 2,000 and a Half Years Ago (1994, directed by Carlo Vanzina) – Varrone
- The Star Maker (1995, directed by Giuseppe Tornatore) - Flirtatious Client
- Italiani (1996, directed by Maurizio Ponzi) - Rosario
- Luna e l'altra (1996, directed by Maurizio Nichetti) - Director
- Il figlio di Bakunin (1997, directed by Gianfranco Cabiddu) - Corbo
- La fame e la sete (1999, directed by Antonio Albanese) - Zu Alfiu
- Amore a prima vista (1999, directed by Vincenzo Salemme) - Don Antonio
- Oltremare (1999, directed by Nello Correale)
- One Hundred Steps (2000, directed by Marco Tullio Giordana) - Luigi Impastato
- E adesso sesso (2001, directed by Carlo Vanzina) (with the name of Luigi Burruano) - Barone
- Gasoline (2001, directed by Monica Stambrini) - Padre Gabriele
- Nowhere (2002, directed by Luis Sepúlveda) - Salomon Goldman
- Nati stanchi (2002, directed by Dominick Tambasco) - Don Ciccio
- Ginostra (2002, directed by Manuel Pradal) - Ettore's Uncle
- Il trasformista (2002, directed by Luca Barbareschi) - Battani
- Cuore scatenato (2003, directed by Gianluca Sodaro) - Santo Cimino
- Break Free (2003, directed by Gianluca Maria Tavarelli) - Cenzo
- The Return of Cagliostro (2003, directed by Daniele Ciprì e Franco Maresco) - Carmelo La Marca
- I Can See It in Your Eyes (2004, directed by Valia Santella) - Carlo
- Concorso di colpa (2004, directed by Claudio Fragasso) - Ispettore Di Nunzio
- Miracle in Palermo! (2005, directed by Beppe Cino) - Fofò
- Quo Vadis, Baby? (2005, directed by Gabriele Salvatores) - Il capitano
- ...e se domani (2005, directed by Giovanni La Parola) - Commissario
- Three Days of Anarchy (2005, directed by Vito Zagarrio) - Don Mimmo
- Really SSSupercool: Chapter Two (2006, directed by Carlo Vanzina) - Don Calogero Calì
- Baciami piccina (2006, directed by Roberto Cimpanelli) - Mafioso in carcere
- La fine del mare (2007, directed by Nora Hoppe) - Aurelio
- Milano-Palermo: il ritorno (2007, directed by Claudio Fragasso) - Giudice Conti
- ''Blood of the Losers (2008, directed by Michele Soavi) - Mario Vagagini
- Baarìa (2009, directed by Giuseppe Tornatore) - Chemist
- Napoli, Napoli, Napoli (2009, directed by Abel Ferrara) - Comandante
- Pochi giorni per capire (2009, directed by Carlo Fusco)
- Le ultime 56 ore (2010, directed by Claudio Fragasso) - Avallone
- Qualunquemente (2011, directed by Giulio Manfredonia) - Imprenditore
- In questa vita (2011, Short, directed by Eitan Pitigliani) - Nino
- Il viaggio di Malombra (2012, directed by Rino Marino)
- Vespro d'un rinnegato (2012, directed by Carlo Fusco) - Don Cimino
- The Ideal City (2012, directed by Luigi Lo Cascio) - Avv. Scalici
- Pagate fratelli (2012, directed by Salvo Bonaffini)
- Tutto tutto niente niente (2012, directed by Giulio Manfredonia) - Imprenditore
- La madre (2013, directed by Angelo Maresca) - Don Quirico
- The Wait (2016, directed by Emil Langballe) - Vincent Cavallo
- Quel bravo ragazzo (2016, directed by Enrico Lando) - Don Ferdinando Cosimato

=== Television ===
- La piovra (1997, season 8, directed by Giacomo Battiato)
- Sotto la luna (1998, TV Movie, directed by Franco Bernini) - Renato Cianchi
- Oltremare - Non è l'America (1998, directed by Nello Correale)
- Turbo (1999, directed by Antonio Bonifacio) - commissario di Polizia Lamberti
- Il commissario Montalbano (2001) - Giacomo Larussa
- L'attentatuni (2001, TV Movie, directed by Claudio Bonivento) - Leoluca Barone
- Saint Anthony: The Miracle Worker of Padua (2002, TV Movie, directed by Umberto Marino) - João
- Salvo D'Acquisto (2003, TV Movie, directed by Alberto Sironi) - Maggiore Spada
- Il maresciallo Rocca (2003) - Michele Garrone
- Camera Café (2003, TV Series)
- Paolo Borsellino (2004, TV Movie, directed by Gianluca Maria Tavarelli) - Tommaso Buscetta
- Mio figlio (2005, directed by Luciano Odorisio) - Salvatore
- R.I.S. - Delitti imperfetti (2005, directed by Alexis Sweet) - Mauro Donati
- Il giudice Mastrangelo (2005, directed by Enrico Oldoini) - Procuratore De Cesare
- L'onore e il rispetto (2006-2009, directed by Salvatore Samperi) - Don Rosario Liberati
- Raccontami (2007) - Salvatore Lo Buono
- Io e mio figlio - Nuove storie per il commissario Vivaldi (2010) - Salvatore Girlando
- Squadra antimafia - Palermo oggi (2011, TV Series)
- Il segreto dell'acqua (2011, directed by Renato De Maria) - Salvatore Girlando
- Sangue caldo (2011, directed by Luigi Parisi, Alessio Inturri) - Vito Cirasola
