= List of Italian films of 1990 =

A list of films produced in Italy in 1990 (see 1990 in film):

Title	Director	Cast	Genre	Notes
1990
1001 Nights	Philippe de Broca	Catherine Zeta-Jones, Thierry Lhermitte, Vittorio Gassman	fantasy	French-Italian co-production
Alberto Express	Arthur Joffé	Sergio Castellitto, Nino Manfredi, Marie Trintignant	comedy	French-Italian co-production
The Amusements of Private Life	Cristina Comencini	Delphine Forest, Christophe Malavoy, Giancarlo Giannini, Vittorio Gassman	comedy	Italian-French co-production
L'aria serena dell'ovest	Silvio Soldini	Fabrizio Bentivoglio	Comedy	
Atto di dolore	Pasquale Squitieri	Claudia Cardinale, Bruno Cremer, Giulia Boschi	drama	
L'avaro	Tonino Cervi	Alberto Sordi, Laura Antonelli, Christopher Lee	comedy	
The Bachelor (Mio caro dottor Gräsler)	Roberto Faenza	Keith Carradine, Miranda Richardson, Kristin Scott Thomas, Mario Adorf, Max von Sydow	Drama	
The Black Cobra 2	Edoardo Margheriti	Fred Williamson	action	
Terminator II	Bruno Mattei	Geretta Geretta	science fiction	
Breath of Life (Diceria dell'untore)	Beppe Cino	Franco Nero, Vanessa Redgrave, Fernando Rey	Drama	
Captain Fracassa's Journey	Ettore Scola	Vincent Perez, Emmanuelle Béart, Massimo Troisi, Ornella Muti	comedy	Entered into the 41st Berlin International Film Festival
A Cat in the Brain	Lucio Fulci	Lucio Fulci, Brett Halsey	horror	
The Comfort of Strangers	Paul Schrader	Christopher Walken, Natasha Richardson, Rupert Everett, Helen Mirren	psychological thriller	American-Italian-British co-production
Le comiche	Neri Parenti	Renato Pozzetto, Paolo Villaggio	comedy	
The Dark Sun	Damiano Damiani	Michael Paré, Jo Champa, Phyllis Logan	Thriller	
Demonia	Lucio Fulci	Brett Halsey	horror	
Una donna da guardare	Michele Quaglieri	Pamela Prati, George Ardisson	erotic	
Everybody's Fine	Giuseppe Tornatore	Marcello Mastroianni, Michèle Morgan	drama	Entered into the 1990 Cannes Film Festival
The Flesh	Marco Ferreri	Sergio Castellitto, Francesca Dellera	Drama	
Halfaouine: Boy of the Terraces	Férid Boughedir	Selim Boughedir, Mustapha Adouani, Rabiah Ben-Abdullah	Drama, Comedy	Tunisian-French-Italian co-production
I'll Be Going Now	Dino Risi	Vittorio Gassman, Elliott Gould, Dominique Sanda	comedy-drama	
In nome del popolo sovrano	Luigi Magni	Luca Barbareschi, Elena Sofia Ricci, Alberto Sordi, Nino Manfredi	historical comedy-drama	David di Donatello for best costumes
Italia-Germania 4-3	Andrea Barzini	Massimo Ghini, Fabrizio Bentivoglio, Nancy Brilli	comedy	
King of New York	Abel Ferrara	Christopher Walken, Laurence Fishburne, David Caruso, Victor Argo, Wesley Snipes	neo-noir gangster	Italian-American co-production
The King's Whore	Axel Corti	Timothy Dalton, Valeria Golino	drama	French-Italian co-production
Il male oscuro	Mario Monicelli	Giancarlo Giannini, Emmanuelle Seigner, Stefania Sandrelli	comedy drama	David di Donatello for Best Director
Ne parliamo Lunedì	Luciano Odorisio	Andrea Roncato, Elena Sofia Ricci	comedy	David di Donatello for Best Actress
Nikita	Luc Besson	Anne Parillaud, Marc Duret, Jean-Hugues Anglade, Tchéky Karyo, Jeanne Moreau, Jean Bouise, Jean Reno, Philippe Leroy, Roland Blanche, Jacques Boudet	Action thriller	French-Italian co-production
On Tour (Turnè)	Gabriele Salvatores	Diego Abatantuono, Fabrizio Bentivoglio, Laura Morante	comedy	Screened at the 1990 Cannes Film Festival
Open Doors (Porte Aperte)	Gianni Amelio	Gian Maria Volonté, Ennio Fantastichini, Renato Carpentieri, Tuccio Musumeci	Drama	Academy Award nominee. 4 David di Donatello. 2 Nastro d'Argento. 4 European Film Awards
Pummarò	Michele Placido	Pamela Villoresi, Franco Interlenghi	drama	Screened at the 1990 Cannes Film Festival
Ragazzi fuori	Marco Risi	Francesco Benigno, Alessandro Di Sanzo, Salvatore Termini	drama	Entered into the 47th Venice International Film Festival
Ritual of Love (Rito d'amore)	Aldo Lado	Beatrice Edith Ring Fiocchi, Larry Huckmann	Crime drama	
The Secret	Francesco Maselli	Nastassja Kinski, Stefano Dionisi, Chiara Caselli	drama	Entered into the 40th Berlin International Film Festival
The Sheltering Sky	Bernardo Bertolucci	Debra Winger, John Malkovich, Campbell Scott	Drama	British-Italian co-production. BAFTA and Golden Globe winner
Stasera a casa di Alice	Carlo Verdone	Carlo Verdone, Sergio Castellitto, Ornella Muti	comedy	
The Station (La stazione)	Sergio Rubini	Sergio Rubini, Margherita Buy, Ennio Fantastichini	Comedy, Drama	2 David di Donatello. 2 Nastro d'Argento. Venice Award
The Sun Also Shines at Night	Paolo and Vittorio Taviani	Julian Sands, Charlotte Gainsbourg, Nastassja Kinski	drama	Screened at the 1990 Cannes Film Festival
Terminator II	Bruno Mattei	Geretta Geretta	science fiction	
There Was a Castle with Forty Dogs	Duccio Tessari	Peter Ustinov, Jean-Claude Brialy	comedy	
Towards Evening	Francesca Archibugi	Marcello Mastroianni, Sandrine Bonnaire, Giovanna Ralli	drama	2 David di Donatello, 2 Nastro d'Argento
Traces of an Amorous Life	Peter Del Monte	Valeria Golino, Chiara Caselli, Walter Chiari, Laura Morante, Stefania Sandrelli	drama	Entered into the 47th Venice International Film Festival
Tre colonne in cronaca	Carlo Vanzina	Gian Maria Volonté, Sergio Castellitto, Senta Berger	drama	David di Donatello for best supporting actor
Troll 2	Claudio Fragasso	Michael Stephenson	Fantasy-horror	
Two Evil Eyes	Dario Argento, George A. Romero	Adrienne Barbeau, Harvey Keitel	Horror	
A Violent Life	Giacomo Battiato	Wadeck Stanczak, Max von Sydow, Ennio Fantastichini, Ben Kingsley	Biographical drama	
Vita coi figli	Dino Risi	Giancarlo Giannini, Monica Bellucci, Corinne Cléry	Comedy	Television film
Voglia di vivere	Lodovico Gasparini	Tomas Milian, Dominique Sanda	Drama	Television film
The Voice of the Moon	Federico Fellini	Roberto Benigni, Paolo Villaggio	Comedy	
Volevo i pantaloni	Maurizio Ponzi	Giulia Fossà, Lucia Bosé, Ángela Molina	drama	
The Week of the Sphinx	Daniele Luchetti	Margherita Buy, Paolo Hendel, Silvio Orlando	comedy-drama	
Welcome to Home Gori	Alessandro Benvenuti	Alessandro Benvenuti, Ilaria Occhini	Comedy	

== See also ==
- 1990 in Italian television
