= Claudio Bonivento =

Italian film producer, director, and screenwriter

- Born: 14 November 1950 (age 75); Faggeto Lario, Italy
- Occupations: Producer, director, screenwriter

Claudio Bonivento (born 14 November 1950) is an Italian film producer, director, and screenwriter.

== Life and career ==
Born in Faggeto Lario, Como, Bonivento began his career as a theatrical organizer, an agent and a record producer. In the late 1970s he started working as a film, television and stage producer. In 1997 he made his directorial debut with Other Men.

In 1989 Bonivento won the Nastro d'Argento for Best Producer for Marco Risi's Forever Mery. He also won three David di Donatello for Best Producer in 1991, 1993 and 2011, respectively for Boys on the Outside, The Escort and 20 Cigarettes.

== Selected filmography ==
Producer

- I fichissimi (1981)
- Viuuulentemente mia (1982)
- I'm Going to Live by Myself (1982)
- Eccezzziunale... veramente (1982)
- Time for Loving (1983)
- A Boy and a Girl (1984)
- Chewingum (1984)
- Love at First Sight (1985)
- Blues metropolitano (1985)
- Il ragazzo del Pony Express (1986)
- Soldati - 365 all'alba (1987)
- Sweets from a Stranger (1987)
- Sposi (1987)
- Delitti e profumi (1988)
- Appointment in Liverpool (1988)
- Days of Inspector Ambrosio (1988)
- Forever Mery (1989)
- Boys on the Outside (1990)
- Pummarò (1991)
- Crack (1991)
- A Simple Story (1991)
- The Inner Circle (1991)
- Sabato italiano (1992)
- When We Were Repressed (1992)
- Ultra (1992)
- The Escort (1993)
- Policemen (1995)
- Who Killed Pasolini? (1995)

Director

- Other Men (1997)
- Le Giraffe (2000)
- Il Pirata: Marco Pantani (2007)
- Era mio fratello (2007)
- Anita Garibaldi (2012)
