= Marco Leonardi =

Italian actor

- Born: 14 November 1971 (age 55); Melbourne, Australia
- Occupation: Actor
- Years active: 1987–present

Marco Leonardi (born 14 November 1971) is an Australian-born Italian film and television actor. He has been nominated twice for the Nastro d'Argento for Best Actor.

Leonardi was born in Australia to Italian parents. He moved to Italy at the age of four and at 17 starred in the acclaimed Italian film Cinema Paradiso (1988). He later starred in the Mexican movie Like Water for Chocolate (1991). He has made several movies in the United States, including Once Upon a Time in Mexico and From Dusk Till Dawn 3: The Hangman's Daughter (2000). Other appearances include the Canadian film The Five Senses (1999).

== Filmography ==
=== Film ===
- The Bride Was Beautiful (1987, directed by Pál Gábor) – Giuseppe
- Il Coraggio di Parlare (1987, directed by Leandro Castellani) – Fortunato, the shepherd
- The Last Minute (1987, directed by Pupi Avati) – Paolo
- Ciao Ma (1988, directed by Giandomenico Curi) – Paolo
- Cinema Paradiso (1988, directed by Giuseppe Tornatore) – Salvatore 'Totò' Di Vita – Teenager
- Street Kids (1989, directed by Nanni Loy) – Salvatore
- The Palermo Connection (1990, directed by Francesco Rosi)
- Ferdinando, un uomo d'amore (1990, directed by Mème Perlini) – Ferdinando
- Like Water for Chocolate (1991, directed by Alfonso Arau) – Pedro Muzquiz
- The Rebel (1993, directed by Aurelio Grimaldi) – Sebastiano
- The Whores (1994, directed by Aurelio Grimaldi) – Maurizio
- Viva San Isidro (1995, directed by Alessandro Cappeletti) – Quintino
- Manhattan Merengue! (1995) – Carmelo
- In the Flesh (1995) – Eddie Sanchez
- Banditi (1995, directed by Stefano Mignucci) – David
- The Stendhal Syndrome (1996, directed by Dario Argento) – Marco Longhi
- Italiani (1996, directed by Maurizio Ponzi) – Fortunato
- Para vivir o morir (1996)
- The Border (1996, directed by Franco Giraldi) – Franco Velich
- My Brother Jack (1997) – Jack Casale
- Una vacanza all'inferno (1997, directed by Tonino Valerii) – Angelo
- The Five Senses (1999, directed by Jeremy Podeswa) – Roberto 'Luigi'
- From Dusk Till Dawn 3: The Hangman's Daughter (2001, directed by P. J. Pesce) – Johnny Madrid
- The Knights of the Quest (2001, directed by Pupi Avati) – Ranieri di Panico
- Texas Rangers (2001) – Jesus Sandoval
- It's Better to Be Wanted for Murder Than Not to Be Wanted at All (2003) – Ben Clemons
- Once Upon a Time in Mexico (2003, directed by Robert Rodriguez) – Fideo
- Mary (2005, directed by Abel Ferrara) – Apostle Peter
- Maradona, the Hand of God (2007) – Diego Maradona
- Red Gold (2009)
- Cha cha cha (2013) – Fotografo
- Black Souls (2014) – Luigi
- Ustica: The Missing Paper (2016) – Corrado di Acquaformosa
- Worldly Girl (2016) – Celestino
- The Space Between (2016) – Di Stasio
- Prigioniero della mia libertà (2016) – Sovrintendente Maggio
- A Family (2017) – Pietro
- All the Money in the World (2017, directed by Ridley Scott) – Mammoliti
- La banalità del crimine (2018) – Conte
- The Last Man (2018) – Antonio
- Soledad (2018) – Belmonte
- Lucania (2019) – Fortunato
- Aspromonte – La terra degli ultimi (2019) – Cosimo
- From the Vine (2019) – Luca
- Martin Eden (2019) – Bernardo Fiore
- The Great Salento War (2022) – Ernesto
- Padre Pio (2022) – Gerardo
- Io e mio fratello (2023)
- My Place Is Here (2024) – Lorenzo

=== Television ===
- Villa Maltraversi (1993, TV Movie, directed by Fabrizio Laurenti) – Mirko Cavicchi
- Pensando all'Africa (1998, directed by Ruggero Deodato)
- Elisa di Rivombrosa (2003, directed by Cinzia Torrini) – Gaetano Capece (2005)
- Don Matteo 4 (2004, directed by Andrea Barzini and Giulio Base) – Saverio Donini
- San Pietro (2005, directed by Giulio Base) – Marco
- Il Capo dei Capi (2007, directed by Enzo Monteleone and Alexis Sweet)
- L'ultimo padrino (2008, directed by Marco Risi) – Emanuele alias 'Africano'
- The Iris Affair (2025)
