= Alessandra Di Sanzo =

Italian actress (born 1969)

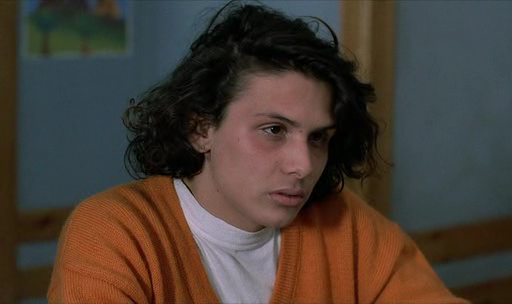
Alessandra Di Sanzo in "Mery per sempre" (1989)

Alessandra Di Sanzo (born 26 August 1969) is an Italian actress best known for her portrayal of the teenage trans prostitute Marilyn Libassi, nicknamed Mery in Marco Risi's dramatic film, Mery per sempre ("Forever Mary"), which was released in 1989 and where she made her acting debut. She received a European Film Award nomination in 1989 for Best Supporting Actor for her performance. Di Sanzo played the same role in Risi's sequel, "Ragazzi fuori" ("Hustlers Outside"), released the following year. As in Mery per sempre, the film was set in Palermo, Sicily and it starred Sicilian actor Francesco Benigno.

Other films in which Di Sanzo is featured include Errore fatale (1992), The Whores (1994), Il prezzo del denaro (1995), Ragazzi della notte (1995), La tenda nera (1996), Vita da paprazzo (2008), and I Picciuli (2009).

Di Sanzo was born at Gattico, Province of Novara, Piedmont, and grew up in Rotonda, a small village in the Province of Potenza, Basilicata, where her family comes from.
