= Tony Sperandeo =

Italian actor (born 1953)

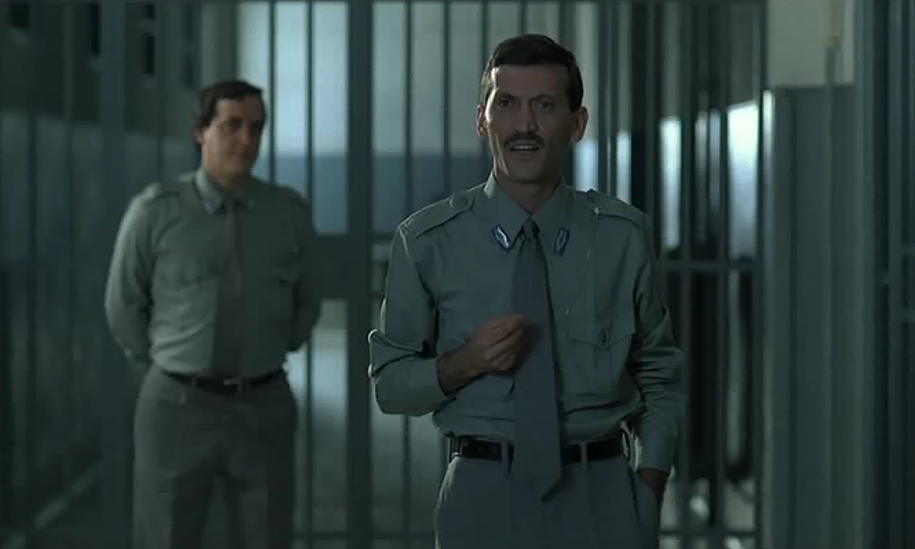
- Sperandeo in the film Forever Mary (1989)
- Born: Gaetano Sperandeo; 8 May 1953 (age 72); Palermo, Italy
- Occupation: actor
- Spouse: Rita Barbanera (m. 1989–2001)
- Children: Tony Sperandeo; Priscilla Sperandeo

Tony Sperandeo (born 8 May 1953) is an Italian actor of cinema and television. Sperandeo is notable for frequently playing the roles of tough characters from his native region, Sicily. As of 2011, he was working on La Nuova Squadra, a police drama televised by Rai Tre, as the Superintendent Salvatore Sciacca.

== Career ==
He was born Gaetano Sperandeo in Palermo.

In 1983, his acting career began with a small part in the film Kaos, directed by the Taviani brothers. In 1985, he landed a role in a cinematographic film Pizza Connection, by Damiano Damiani. He also acted in four of the sequels of the popular television drama, "La piovra", which is about the Mafia and had a little role in The Sicilian of Michael Cimino. He has appeared in many other Italian films, the most notable being La scorta ("The escort") by Ricky Tognazzi, as well as "Boys on the Outside" and "Forever Mary", the latter two set in his home town of Palermo. They are both directed by Marco Risi.

Since 2004, he has appeared regularly on television in the role of Superintendent Salvatore Sciacca, first in the police drama La Squadra (2004–2007), and its sequel, La Nuova Squadra (2008–2009, 2011).

In 2001, Sperandeo won the David di Donatello award for Best Supporting Actor in "I cento passi" ("One Hundred Steps"), directed by Marco Tullio Giordana, about the story of Peppino Impastato in which he played the role of Mafia boss Tano Badalamenti.

== Personal life ==
He was married to actress Rita Barbanera (1968–2001), by whom he has two children, Tony and Priscilla. Sperandeo met her on the set of Mery per sempre, the film in which he was working at the time. They performed together in one film, La discesa di Aclà a Floristella in 1992. Rita was primarily a stage actress.

On April 27, 2001, Rita Barbanera committed suicide by jumping off the balcony at their home in Palermo. She was thirty two years old.

== Filmography ==
=== Film ===
- Kaos (1984)
- Pizza Connection (1985) - Vincenzo
- The Repenter (1985) - Lercara's Henchman (uncredited)
- The Sicilian (1987) - Barracks Policeman #1
- Forever Mary (1989) - Turris, Guardia Carceraria
- Tre colonne in cronaca (1990) - Il commissario Trapani
- The Sun Also Shines at Night (1990) - Gesuino
- Boys on the Outside (1990) - Turris (uncredited)
- A Simple Story (1991) - Policeman
- The Invisible Wall (1991) - Sottufficiale Areonautica
- Piedipiatti (1991) - Agente Buoncostume
- Johnny Stecchino (1991) - Picciotto in auto
- Caldo soffocante (1991) - Aiutante Giuliano
- Briganti (1991)
- Acla's Descent into Floristella (1992) - Caramazza
- The Escort (1993) - Raffaele Frasca
- Uomo di rispetto (1993, TV Movie)
- Quattro bravi ragazzi (1993) - Franchini
- Nel continente nero (1993) - Don Secondino
- The Heroes (1994) - Tonino
- Miracolo italiano (1994) - Onorevole Locafò
- Briganti: Amore e libertà (1994) - Malacarne
- State Secret (1995) - Gangster
- The Star Maker (1995) - 1st Baldalamenti
- Palermo - Milan One Way (1995) - Marinnà
- Vesna Goes Fast (1996) - Il camionista
- Other Men (1997) - Salvatore Marinello
- The Room of the Scirocco (1998) - Sollima
- Volare! (1999) - Don Ciccio
- Una sola debole voce (1998, TV Movie)
- Excellent Cadavers (1999, TV Movie) - Stefano Bontade
- L'uomo della fortuna (2000) - Salvatore
- One Hundred Steps (2000) - Gaetano Badalamenti
- Un giudice di rispetto (2000) - Giudice Francesco Di Nardo
- Arresti domiciliari (2000) - Boss mafia
- E adesso sesso (2001) - Don Calogero
- Tra due mondi (2001)
- Il testimone (2001, TV Movie)
- Il latitante (2003) - Ispettore Sarnataro
- Miracle in Palermo! (2003) - Sparagna
- Really SSSupercool: Chapter Two (2006) - Don Pippo Calì
- Il 7 e l'8 (2007) - Gino La Monica
- The Man of Glass (2007) - Zio Titta
- A Beautiful Wife (2007) - Don Pierino
- Blood of the Losers (2008) - Salustri
- Volevo gli occhi blu (2008) - Pazzo filosofo
- Baaria (2009) - Breeder
- Pochi giorni per capire (2009) - Sacerdote
- I Picciuli (2009) - Giudice
- Un neomelodico presidente (2010) - Il Professore
- Backward (2010) - Gaetano il bastardo
- Prigionero di un segreto (2010) - Don Alfredo
- Dreamland: La terra dei sogni (2011) - Don Nicola
- Pagate fratelli (2012)
- Il ragioniere della mafia (2013) - Capo dei capi
- La moglie del sarto (2014)
- La corona spezzata (2014) - Don Vito Romano
- La settima onda (2015) - Michele Manni
- Il ragazzo della Giudecca (2016) - Procuratore
- Quel bravo ragazzo (2016) - Vito Mancuso
- Amo la tempesta (2016)
- Mò Vi Mento - Lira di Achille (2017)
- L'ora legale (2017) - Gaetano Patanè
- Il mondo di mezzo (2017) - Gaetano Mariotti
- Amare amaro (2018) - Maresciallo
- School of Mafia (2021) - Frankie Ghost
- A Breath of Fresh Air (2022) - Nunzio
- Homo Argentum (2025)

=== Television ===
- La piovra, season 2 (1985, TV Mini-Series) - Ravanusa's Manservant
- Felipe ha gli occhi azzurri (1991)
- La piovra, season 6 (1992, TV Mini-Series) - Santino Rocchi
- A che punto è la notte (1995, TV Movie) - Cagliusco
- Non parla più (1995, TV Movie)
- La piovra, season 8 (1997, TV Movie) - Turi Mondello
- Mia Padre e Innocente (1997, TV Movie) - Augusto Malinverni
- La piovra, season 9 (1998, TV Movie) - Turi Mondello
- Fine secolo (1999, TV Mini-Series) - Corti
- Cronaca di un ricatto (1999, TV Movie)
- Don Matteo (first series, episode "Stato di Ebbrezza", 2000)
- L'attentatuni (2001, TV Movie) - Antonino No&
- Distretto di Polizia (2001) - Vito Tonnara
- Il sequestro Soffrantini (2002, TV Movie) - Giovanni Farina, Anonima Sarda
- Soldati di pace (2003)
- Blindati (2003, TV Movie) - Brando Massari
- Ultimo - L'infiltrato (2003, TV Movie) - Nicola De Rosa
- La Squadra (2005–2007) - Sovrintendente Salvatore Sciacca
- Framed! A Sicilian Murder Mystery (2022-)

== Awards and nominations ==
Year	Award	Category	Work	Result	Ref.
2023	Nastri d'Argento Grandi Serie	Best Supporting Actor	Incastrati	Nominated	
