= Acla's Descent into Floristella =

1992 film

- Directed by: Aurelio Grimaldi
- Written by: Aurelio Grimaldi
- Starring: Luciano Venturino; Ignazio Donato
- Cinematography: Maurizio Calvesi
- Edited by: Raimondo Crociani
- Music by: Dario Lucantoni
- Release date: 1992
- Language: Italian

Acla's Descent into Floristella (Italian: La discesa di Aclà a Floristella) is a 1992 Italian drama film written and directed by Aurelio Grimaldi. It entered the competition at the 49th Venice International Film Festival.

== Cast ==
- Francesco Cusimano: Aclà
- Tony Sperandeo: Caramazza
- Luigi Maria Burruano: Father of Aclà
- Lucia Sardo: Mother of Aclà
