= Salvatore Termini =

Italian actor (born 1967)

- Born: 6 April 1967 (age 58); Palermo, Sicily, Italy
- Occupation: actor

Salvatore Termini (born 6 April 1967 in Palermo, Sicily) is an Italian actor best known for his role as "Giovanni Trapani", nicknamed "King Kong", in two Italian language dramatic films directed by Marco Risi, "Mery per sempre" ("Forever Mary"), in which Termini made his acting debut, and its sequel, "Ragazzi fuori". They were both set in Palermo where Termini was born. He grew up in the bleak, economically deprived quarter of ZEN which features prominently in "Ragazzi Fuori".

In 2012 he returned to television with a role as a hitman in the series "Squadra antimafia - Palermo oggi 4" with Giuseppe Garziano.

== Filmography ==
- Forever Mary (1989)
- Boys on the Outside (1990)
- Ultimo respiro (1992)
- Vite perdute (1992)
- Anni 90: Parte II (1993)
- The Whores (1994)
- Enzo, domani a Palermo, documentary in which he portrays himself (1999)
- Arresti domiciliari (2000)
- Il latitante (2003)

== Television ==
- Squadra antimafia - Palermo oggi 4 (2012)
