= Forever Mary =

Forever Mery
- Directed by: Marco Risi
- Written by: Aurelio Grimaldi; Sandro Petraglia; Stefano Rulli
- Produced by: Claudio Bonivento
- Starring: Michele Placido; Claudio Amendola
- Cinematography: Mauro Marchetti
- Music by: Giancarlo Bigazzi
- Release date: 1989
- Running time: 102 minutes
- Country: Italy
- Languages: Italian, Sicilian

Forever Mary (Italian: Mery per sempre), is an Italian dramatic film directed by Marco Risi and released in 1989. It stars Michele Placido, Claudio Amendola, Alessandra Di Sanzo, Francesco Benigno, Roberto Mariano, Maurizio Prollo, Filippo Genzardi, Alfredo Li Bassi, Salvatore Termini, Luigi Maria Burruano, Gianluca Favilla, Giovanni Alamia, and Tony Sperandeo.

== Synopsis ==
Mery per sempre is set in Rosaspina, a fictional juvenile detention centre (based on a real facility named Malaspina) in Palermo, Sicily, during the 1980s. The protagonist, Marco Terzi (Michele Placido), is a teacher who has been transferred to Palermo from Milan. He obtains a temporary position as a teacher inside the institution, waiting to start teaching in a high school. He has difficulty in establishing a rapport with the young, hostile students; in particular, Natale Sperandeo (Francesco Benigno), the leader of the group, who is inside for murder, and Pietro Giancona (Claudio Amendola). Terzi's situation is further complicated when Marilyn Libassi (Alessandra Di Sanzo), a trans prostitute, nicknamed Mery, falls in love with him. Claudio severely hits Carmelo who wanted to rape him after gaining his trust through apparent friendliness. Over time, Terzi gains the respect and admiration of his students, even from the most hardened of the young men, in contrast with the director and the warders. After the death of Pietro, killed during a robbery after a jailbreak, he decides to refuse a well-paid position in the high school to stay with the boys.

Forever Mary was followed in 1990 with the sequel Ragazzi fuori, featuring most of the same cast and characters, with the exception of Placido and Amendola. The film Mery per sempre was the inspiration behind a song of the same name by the popular Israeli singer Ivri Lider.
