= Vacanze di Natale '91 =

- Directed by: Enrico Oldoini
- Written by: Liliana Betti; Enrico Oldoini; Rodolfo Sonego; Alberto Sordi; Giovanni Veronesi
- Produced by: Luigi De Laurentiis; Aurelio De Laurentiis
- Starring: Christian De Sica; Massimo Boldi; Andrea Roncato; Ezio Greggio; Ornella Muti; Nino Frassica; Alberto Sordi
- Cinematography: Sergio Salvati
- Edited by: Raimondo Crociani
- Music by: Giacomo and Giovanni Dell'Orso; Manuel De Sica
- Distributed by: Filmauro
- Release date: 20 December 1991
- Running time: 121 minutes
- Country: Italy
- Language: Italian
- Box office: $7.4 million (Italy)

Vacanze di Natale '91 (lit. '1991 Christmas Holiday') is a 1991 Italian Christmas comedy film directed by Enrico Oldoini.

== Cast ==
- Christian De Sica as Enzo Lambertoni
- Massimo Boldi as Nanni Lambertoni
- Andrea Roncato as Mimmo
- Ezio Greggio as Leopoldo
- Ornella Muti as Giuliana
- Nino Frassica as Rino
- Alberto Sordi as Sabino
- Francesco Benigno as Salvatore
- Nadia Rinaldi as Fernanda Lambertoni
- Connie Nielsen as Brunilde / Vanessa
- Susanna Bequer as Marta
- Anna Benny as Simona
- Claudio Gora as The Honourable Mariotti
- Kerry Hubbard as Ingrid Lambertoni
- Geppy Gleijeses as Filippo
- Franco Angrisano as Pistolesi
- Sandro Ghiani as the waiter
- Franco Caracciolo as Lenzi
- Paolo Paoloni as Mr. Martelli
- Gianni Zullo as the priest
- Jimmy il Fenomeno as the athlete
- Daniele Dublino as the hotel's manager

== Reception ==
The film grossed $7.4 million in Italy and was the second-highest-grossing Italian film in Italy in 1992.

== See also ==
- List of Christmas films
