= Lucia Sardo =

Italian actress

- Born: Aurora Sardo; 13 December 1952 (age 73); Francofonte, Syracuse

Lucia Sardo (born 13 December 1952) is an Italian actress.

== Life and career ==
Born Aurora Sardo in Francofonte, Syracuse, Sardo studied at the drama school of the Teatro di Ventura under Ferruccio Merisi. She made her film debut in the 1992 Aurelio Grimaldi drama Acla's Descent into Floristella, and two years later she got her first major role in Grimaldi's The Whores. Her breakout came in 2001, with the role of Felicia, Giuseppe Impastato's mother, in Marco Tullio Giordana's One Hundred Steps; for her performance she was nominated for Nastro d'Argento in the "supporting actress" category.

== Filmography ==
Year	Title	Role	Notes
2017	L'onore e il rispetto		
2022	From Scratch	Filomena	Netflix
