= Anni 90: Parte II =

- Directed by: Enrico Oldoini
- Written by: Enrico Oldoini
- Produced by: Luigi De Laurentiis; Aurelio De Laurentiis
- Starring: Massimo Boldi; Christian De Sica; Nino Frassica; Andrea Roncato; Carol Alt
- Cinematography: Giuseppe Ruzzolini
- Edited by: Raimondo Crociani
- Music by: Manuel De Sica
- Release date: 30 October 1992
- Running time: 113 minutes
- Country: Italy
- Language: Italian

Anni 90: Parte II (lit. 'The Nineties: Part II') is a 1993 Italian sketch comedy film directed by Enrico Oldoini.

The film is an anthological sequel to the 1992 comedy Anni 90.

== Cast ==
- Massimo Boldi as judge Lorenzo Minghetti / Ambrogio Testa / Bepi / Gino Bramieri
- Christian De Sica as don Rodolfo Buro / Roberto Torri
- Nino Frassica as Tano Bedrò / friar / himself
- Andrea Roncato as Tano's lawyer / Armando / head office / himself
- Carol Alt as Barbara / Sally Troumphet
- Francesco Benigno as Nino / Salvatore Laganà
- Nadia Rinaldi as Graziella Bramieri
- Anna Falchi as Lola Ciccone
- Silvio Spaccesi as Bastiano Ciccone
- Maurizio Prollo as Toni
- Salvatore Termini as Mimmo
- Tano Cimarosa as Mimì Cantalamessa
- Alberto Castagna as himself
