= Miracolo italiano =

1994 Italian anthology comedy film

- Directed by: Enrico Oldoini
- Written by: Enrico Oldoini; Liliana Betti; Giovanna Caico; Bernardino Zapponi
- Starring: Renato Pozzetto; Ezio Greggio; Nino Frassica; Giorgio Faletti; Leonardo Pieraccioni; Athina Cenci; Daniela Conti; Anna Falchi; Claudia Koll; Maria Amelia Monti; Nadia Rinaldi
- Cinematography: Giorgio Di Battista
- Edited by: Raimondo Crociani
- Music by: Manuel De Sica
- Release date: 1994
- Country: Italy
- Language: Italian

Miracolo italiano (also known as An Italian Miracle) is a 1994 Italian anthology comedy film directed by Enrico Oldoini.

== Cast ==
- Renato Pozzetto: Fermo Pulciani/ Passenger of the Ferry
- Nino Frassica: Toti/ Ernesto
- Ezio Greggio: Manuel Rodriguez/ Marcello Troiani
- Giorgio Faletti: Teodoro Pautasso, aka Teo
- Maria Amelia Monti: Lucia Baggioni
- Leonardo Pieraccioni: Saverio
- Anna Falchi: Maria
- Nadia Rinaldi: Adelaide
- Claudia Koll: Maria Carla
- Daniela Conti: Rosalia
- Athina Cenci: Teo's mother-in-law/ Saverio's mother
- Carlo Monni: Nedo
- Novello Novelli: Grandfather of Saverio
- Sergio Bini Bustric: Brother of Saverio
- Tony Sperandeo: Deputy Locafò
- Gianfranco Barra: Deputy Nania
- Cecilia Dazzi: Vanessa
- Carlotta Natoli: Samantha
- Dario Bandiera: the Taxi Driver
- Enrico Brignano: Michele
- Remo Remotti: Fermo's father
- Francesco Benigno: Carmelo
