= Other Men =

- Directed by: Claudio Bonivento
- Written by: Claudio Bonivento; Franco Ferrini; Furio Scarpelli
- Cinematography: Sergio D'Offizi
- Music by: Gianni Coscia; Fred Ferrari
- Release date: 1997
- Language: Italian

Other Men (Italian: Altri uomini) is a 1997 Italian crime drama film written and directed by Claudio Bonivento.

It is based on real-life characters documented in the Antonio Carlucci and Paolo Rossetti's book Io il Tebano ("I, the Theban"). For his performance Claudio Amendola received a Nastro d'Argento nomination for best actor.

== Cast ==
- Claudio Amendola as Michele Croce
- Ennio Fantastichini as Loris Corbi
- Antonino Iuorio as Turi Maiolo
- Veronica Pivetti as Maria De Simone
- Ricky Memphis as Riccardo Zanni
- Ugo Conti as Ugo Conti
- Tony Sperandeo as Salvatore
- Giovanna Nodari as Marina
- Stefania Montorsi as Mimma Croce
- Vincenzo Peluso as Rino
