= Angela (2002 film) =

- Directed by: Roberta Torre
- Written by: Roberta Torre; Massimo D'Anolfi
- Produced by: Rita Rusic; Lierka Rusic
- Starring: Donatella Finocchiaro; Andrea Di Stefano
- Cinematography: Daniele Ciprì
- Music by: Andrea Guerra
- Release date: 2002
- Language: Italian

Angela is a 2002 Italian drama film written and directed by Roberta Torre.

It was screened in the Directors' Fortnight at the 55th Cannes Film Festival. For her performance in this film Donatella Finocchiaro won the Globo d'oro for best female newcomer.

== Cast ==
- Donatella Finocchiaro as Angela
- Andrea Di Stefano as Masino
- Mario Pupella as Saro
- Erasmo Lobello as Mimmo
- Matteo Gulino as Paolino
- Toni Gambino as Santino
- Giuseppe Pettinato as Raffaele Santangelo
- Maria Mistretta as Minica
- Mauro Spitaleri as Commissioner
