= Lui è peggio di me =

- Italian theatrical release poster by Renato Casaro
- Directed by: Enrico Oldoini
- Produced by: Mario & Vittorio Cecchi Gori
- Starring: Adriano Celentano; Renato Pozzetto
- Cinematography: Alessandro D'Eva
- Edited by: Antonio Siciliano
- Music by: Manuel De Sica
- Distributed by: Variety Distribution
- Release date: 1984
- Language: Italian
- Box office: $1,645,000 (Italy)

Lui è peggio di me (He is worse than me) is a 1984 Italian comedy film directed by Enrico Oldoini.

== Plot ==
Leonardo and Luciano are two forty-year bachelors, lifelong friends. Holders of a company that rents vintage cars, are doing well and is easy to grant all the girls they want. The solid friendship goes up in smoke when Leonardo falls in love with Giovanna.

== Cast ==
- Adriano Celentano: Leonardo
- Renato Pozzetto: Luciano
- Kelly Van der Velden: Giovanna
- Daniel Stephen: Cowboy Roy

== Reception ==
The film was the seventh highest-grossing film in Italy for the year with a gross of $1.6 million (3.2 billion lire) from 12 key cities and the third highest-grossing local film, behind Nothing Left to Do But Cry and I due carabinieri.
