= ZEN (Palermo) =

First-level unit of Palermo

Coordinates: 38°10′45″N 13°18′57″E

San Filippo Neri ZEN Zona Espansione Nord
- Quartiere of Palermo
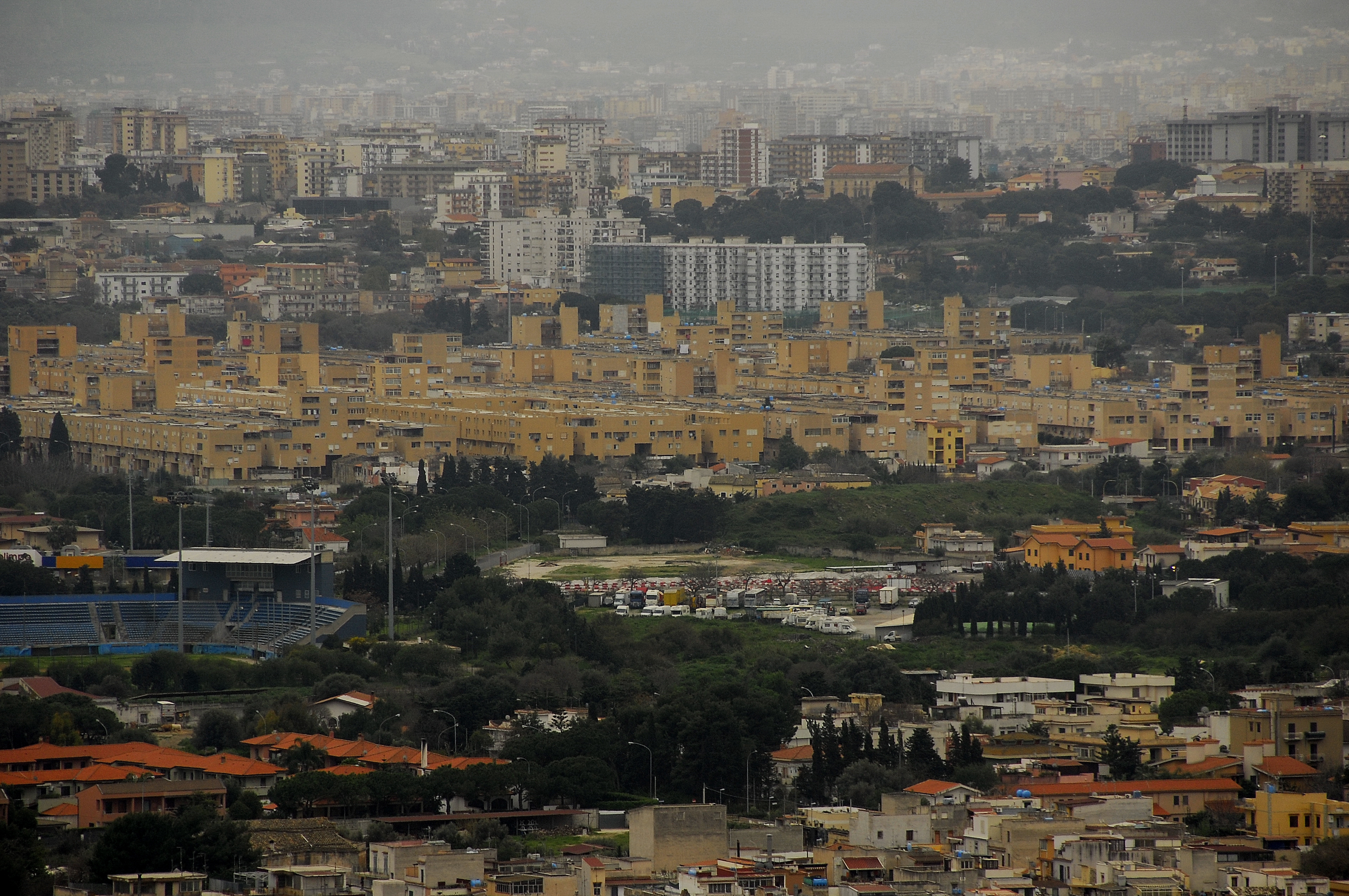
- Panoramic view of the ZEN district

- Position of the district within the city of Palermo
- Country: Italy
- Region: Sicily
- Province: Metropolitan City of Palermo
- Comune: Palermo
- Municipality: VII

Population (2022)
  - Total: 13,513
- Time zone: UTC+1 (CET)
  - Summer (DST): UTC+2 (CEST)
- CAP: 90147

ZEN, acronym for Zona Espansione Nord ("North Expansion Area"), is a social housing district in the northern outskirts of Palermo, in the autonomous region of Sicily, Southern Italy. It is included in the 7th municipal division of the city. It was renamed San Filippo Neri ("Saint Philip Neri") in 1997.

The district is one of the last public housing neighborhoods built to deal with the housing emergency that Palermo was facing after World War II, during which much of the city center had been destroyed or severely damaged by bombings. It is divided in two residential areas with different building characteristics, called ZEN 1 and ZEN 2. The latter, designed by the architect Vittorio Gregotti in 1969, is infamously known for the political and social events that made it a symbol of urban decay. It is often associated with numerous low-income housing blocks built in Italy between the 1960s and 1980s, like Scampia in Naples or Quarto Oggiaro in Milan.

In the 1970s, due to bureaucratic delays in assigning homes and political carelessness, the vast majority of houses under construction at ZEN 2 were occupied with the complicity of the Sicilian Mafia, who exploited the poverty of the inhabitants to take control of the area. The squatting phenomenon, which still affects the neighborhood today and is still controlled by mafia clans (or families), stopped the construction of many infrastructure works. ZEN 2 has remained an economically deprived area ever since.

Over time, the Sicilian Mafia took advantage of the isolation and degradation of the area for drug and firearms trafficking, the coordination of racketeering, as well as to hide fugitives from the authorities. For this reason, it began to be considered one of the main Mafia strongholds in the Metropolitan City of Palermo. The Italian law enforcement still considers it a hot zone for anti-drug and anti-racketeering operations.

ZEN has frequently been depicted by the media as one of the worst neighborhoods in the country for quality of life and has been repeatedly associated with images of social decay. To this day, despite the work of numerous associations for its redevelopment, the district lacks adequate infrastructure and continues to present social problems due to the extreme marginalization from the rest of the city territory. For this reason, in 2015 the architect Massimiliano Fuksas proposed its demolition, together with other similar blocks in Italy.

Italian director Marco Risi used ZEN as the setting for his 1990 drama film Ragazzi fuori (Boys on the Outside), which depicted the social problems and lack of opportunities faced by the unemployed youth of ZEN.

== History ==
=== Background ===
==== Post-war period and Palermo housing emergency ====
The bombing of Palermo in the Second World War razed to the ground much of its city centre, causing a total of 227,149 displaced persons compared to the mere 400,000 inhabitants that the city had at the outbreak of the conflict (from which 2,123 officially registered civilian casualties must be subtracted, even if the number could be much higher given the unreliability of the data collected during the war by the fascist authorities). According to statistical surveys promoted by the AMGOT - the Allied Military Government of Occupied Territories installed in Sicily after its conquest in 1943 - more than half of the 285,000 residential buildings existing in Palermo in 1940 were destroyed or made uninhabitable, making it one of the most affected cities by the Anglo-American strategy of carpet bombing during the Italian campaign.

In the post-war period, the housing shortage crisis caused by wartime destruction was amplified by demographic growth and the significant rural exodus to the city. The same problem affected the entire Italian territory; according to the Census of 1951, the country could provide only 241 dwellings for each 1,000 inhabitants, less housing per person than any country in Western Europe except West Germany and the Netherlands.

To deal with the Palermo housing emergency, starting in the 1950s the city council promoted the construction of entire new districts in what were once peripheral areas compared to the old centre. However, the urban expansion was marked by the infiltration of Cosa Nostra (the Sicilian Mafia) into the public administration; mafia clans managed to enter the Sicilian bureaucratic machine for the first time between 1943 and 1945, by exploiting the administrative needs of the Anglo-American military government, and in the following decades they continued to sabotage the political life of the island to increase their power (the race for political representation by mafia families was the main cause of the First Mafia War fought between 1962 and 1963).

==== The Mafia's building speculation ====
During the Italian economic miracle (1950s – 1960s), traditional mafias (the Sicilian Cosa Nostra, the Campanian Camorra, the Calabrian 'Ndrangheta, and other Italian regional mafias), until then characterized by a parasitic relationship with the companies operating in their territory (e.g. through the imposition of protection money), became commercial enterprises themselves through infiltration of public procurement system and the illicit management of contracts. This activity led the clans to accumulate an enormous amount of wealth and to intensify their dominion over certain areas.

Starting from 1948, the Sicilian Mafia chose to support the Christian Democracy party, which won the Palermo municipal elections in 1958 and 1965 thanks above all to corruption and the subjugation of the weakest social classes. Politicians and mafiosi Salvo Lima and Vito Ciancimino, respectively mayor and assessor for public works of the elected council, allowed Cosa Nostra and the construction companies linked to it to profit from the need to expand the building surface of the city.

Mafia speculation on planning permissions between the 1950s and the 1970s altered the urban landscape forever, and also damaged the city's environmental and historical heritage; this event took the name of Sack of Palermo. In this context, tons of concrete were poured into rich countryside areas in order to build new neighborhoods, often destroying or reducing the aristocratic resorts built in the 18th century, other noticeable buildings, and even naturalistic sites.

==== The public housing neighborhoods ====
In 1949 the Italian government approved the first national plan for working class housing, the INA-Casa Plan conceived by the Minister of Labor Amintore Fanfani, which had at its disposal the funds managed by a specific organisation of the National Insurance Institute. The project aimed to uplift the classes most impoverished by the war, and in the first seven years it created about 355,000 homes in over 5,000 Italian municipalities (or comuni).

The INA-Casa Plan was soon joined by numerous other social housing projects promoted by various institutes. One of these was the Autonomous Institute of Public Housing or IACP (Italian: Istituto Autonomo Case Popolari), with branches in the main Italian cities.

In Palermo, the large investments in public housing promoted by the central government were in many cases intercepted by the mafia, which, thanks to the political support it enjoyed at the time through institutional infiltration and corruption, already had decision-making power over the building permissions.

=== Founding of the ZEN district ===
The ZEN district project was approved in 1966, as part of a public housing plan presented by the IACP Palermo office. The city council agreed to place the new neighborhood in the center of Hills Plain (Italian: Piana dei Colli), a vast valley in the northernmost area of Palermo, which until then had represented one of the most flourishing countrysides in the entire Palermo area.

=== ZEN 2 ===
The 1968 Belice earthquake increased the housing emergency in Palermo, as a tragic number of residential areas throughout western Sicily collapsed or were severely damaged by the seismic sequence; 4 towns in the Belice Valley were destroyed completely, 4 others had 70 to 80% of their buildings gutted, and 6 others suffered extensive damage, for a total amount of 14 towns devastated by the natural disaster and about 100,000 displaced people. This intensified the already underway exodus process from rural areas to the regional capital city.

To provide enough dwellings for the working class, the IACP Palermo office promoted the expansion of the ZEN neighborhood through a competition announcement, which was won by the architect Vittorio Gregotti, Neo-Avant Guarde exponent from Novara, in 1969. He designed the new housing complex, later renamed ZEN 2, with the collaboration of other architects and urban planners, namely Franco Purini, Salvatore Bisogni, Franco Amoroso, and Hiromichi Matsui. The project, after having aroused considerable interest within the national and international architectural debate, was subjected to several variations that betrayed the intentions of the designers, never reaching complete realization.

The difficulties of this large peripheral area are attributable to the following causes; the exclusion of the design group in the executive phase of the construction site, the failure to create services, equipment, and for a long time also primary urbanization works, as well as the illegal occupation of a good part of the housing. Identified as a bad example of a "dormitory neighborhood", it is classified as a place where crime, illegal building and degradation coexist. Furthermore, it is isolated from the context that surrounds it, not only ideally but also physically, due to the road artery that circumscribes its entire edge.

=== ZEN today ===
While ZEN 1 developed as one of the many peripheral working-class neighborhoods, ZEN 2 is still marked today by significant phenomena of urban and social degradation, as well as by the presence of organized crime, and is considered one of the residential areas with the most critical conditions in Palermo.

Despite the fight against criminal activities in the neighborhood conducted over time by the municipal administration, several police investigations have revealed how ZEN 2 is still a nerve centre for the Sicilian Mafia, which continues to hinder the presence of State institutions in the area through both coercion of residents and exploitation of their state of need.

In the reports carried out by law enforcement agencies, the new clans have been described as more exuberant and out of control, as evidenced by some incidents of gang warfare that occurred in broad daylight in the ZEN neighborhood. They also planned robberies of armored vehicles and petrol stations with automatic firearms and plastic explosives.

Home occupation continues to be a major concern in ZEN 2; data collected up to 2017 by the municipal administration and associations in the area reported that more than 8,000 residents were still occupying properties without authorization. The city council has authorized clearing operations on several occasions, but the problem has never found a definitive solution due to multiple factors, including humanitarian issues.

Another critical aspect of ZEN 2 still today is the high amount of thefts of running water and electric current. Squatters, who often occupy apartments that were never completed and therefore do not have functioning plumbing and electrical systems, make illegal connections to public networks to ensure their access to water and electricity. In most cases, illegal energy management has been linked to mafia clans.

In 2018, the Sicilian Regional Assembly granted those who occupied a public apartment by the end of the previous year the possibility of regularizing their position. The measure affected approximately 3,700 families.

In 2025, the neighborhood returned to the news following the massacre committed by a group of young residents, who killed three young people and wounded two others with numerous gunshots while they were in the town of Monreale, on the border of Palermo, on the night between April 26th and 27th. The first two culprits identified by police, aged 18 and 19, refused to provide details about their accomplices and the origin of the guns they used. A third 19-year-old culprit has been identified after days of investigation, however the murder weapons were never delivered nor found by the police. According to reconstructions, the shooters attacked the victims after having provoked them for trivial reasons, not hesitating to open fire even though the place was full of people due to the patronal festival, and eyewitnesses also reported that they were cheering after killing their targets. The event has shaken public opinion and has once again brought to light the culture of violence and code of silence that still exists today in the poorest strata of ZEN.

== Demography ==
According to the census of Palermo, ZEN has a population of around 13,513 people as of 2022. However, it is impossible to have accurate data due to the presence of numerous unregistered families living in the neighborhood, inside illegally occupied houses. According to estimates by one of the most active cultural associations in the area, ZEN Insieme, the population would be around 22,000 people.

It is estimated that 21.47% of families live in conditions of economic hardship and the unemployment rate is about 16.88%. The school dropout rate is among the highest in Italy, with 2 out of 3 young people abandoning their studies before getting their high school diploma.

== In popular culture ==
The troubled history of ZEN was the subject of a documentary of the same name directed by Gian Vittorio Baldi and released in 1989.

Director Marco Risi used the district as one of the key locations for the 1990 drama Boys on the Outside (Ragazzi Fuori), in which a group of young outcasts, released from juvenile prison, deal with the lack of hope and opportunities that plague the worst suburbs of Palermo. The film was dedicated to the memory of Stefano Consiglio, a 16-year-old boy from ZEN killed by a police officer during a car chase in 1991.

Still in 1991, director Felice Farina chose to shoot a film about the difficult life of the teenagers living in ZEN, but the production was contested and sabotaged by the local parish priest supported by some residents, who were against the idea of another film that showed the negative sides of the district. The film still managed to be shot and was released in Italian theaters in 1992, with the title Last Breath (Ultimo Respiro).

In 2005, an investigative documentary filmed by Antonella Longo about the birth and contradictions of the neighborhood, ZENigma, was released, and later re-proposed at the University of Milan film festival in 2010 and 2012.

In 2012 ZEN was the setting of the dark comedy film It was the son, directed by Daniele Ciprì and based on the novel of the same name by Roberto Alajmo. In the movie, a man living in ZEN 2 decides to buy a luxury Mercedes car with the money he received from the Italian government as compensation for the loss of his daughter, who was killed by mistake in a mafia shootout, rather than using them to secure a future outside the ghetto for his family. The filming did not take place in the ZEN district, but in a social housing neighborhood in Apulia, since the film was financed with funds from an Apulian film commission.

In 2015, director Ruggero Gabbai released cityZen, a documentary about the ZEN district that took 7 years to produce.

In 2018, Italian television personality Vittorio Brumotti hosted a report at ZEN 2 on behalf of the television program Striscia La Notizia, in which he went around the neighborhood to track down and publicly denounce drug dealers. He and his crew were quickly ambushed and forced to flee in their armored car, which was pelted with bricks, including a 60-kg block of concrete thrown from a balcony, and hit by a gunshot. The report has caused a media sensation, but has also been the subject of much criticism. Many have accused Brumotti of sensationalizing the social distress of the neighborhood for the sake of profit and fame. He was also accused of not targeting the real managers of drug trafficking, focusing only on street dealers and therefore on the most superficial and weakest part of the chain (as well as the most replaceable), with the intent of provoking public outrage towards the ZEN residents rather than building a serious investigation into drug dealing.

Over the years, the conditions of the ZEN 2 neighborhood have been discussed in numerous reports by RAI, the Italian national broadcasting company. In many cases, reports were carried out in collaboration with the main law enforcement agencies, aimed at showing the difficult conditions in which the police forces must operate inside the neighborhood, and the success achieved in combating illegal activities, especially drug dealing.

== Bibliography ==
- Fava, Ferdinando (2008). Lo Zen di Palermo: antropologia dell'esclusione. La società. Milano: Angeli. ISBN 978-88-464-9567-9.
- Alessandra Badami, Marco Picone, Filippo Schilleci (eds.), Città nell'emergenza. Progettare e costruire tra Gibellina e lo Zen, Palumbo Editore, Palermo. 2008 - ISBN 88-6017-046-X
