= School of Mafia =

2021 comedy film

- Directed by: Alessandro Pondi
- Screenplay by: Mauro Graiani; Riccardo Irrera; Paolo Logli; Alessandro Pondi
- Cinematography: Vladan Radovic
- Edited by: Marco Spoletini
- Music by: Cris Ciampoli
- Distributed by: 01 Distribution
- Release date: 2021
- Language: Italian

School of Mafia is a 2021 Italian crime comedy film co-written and directed by Alessandro Pondi.

== Cast ==
- Giuseppe Maggio as Nick Di Maggio
- Guglielmo Poggi as Joe Cavallo
- Michele Ragno as Tony Masseria
- Emilio Solfrizzi as Donato Cavallo
- Fabrizio Ferracane as Primo Di Maggio
- Paolo Calabresi as Vito Masseria
- Maurizio Lombardi as Salvo Svizzero
- Nino Frassica as Don Turi ’u Appicciaturi
- Gianfranco Gallo as Don Masino Mazzarò
- Paola Minaccioni as Carmela
- Giulia Petrungaro as Rosalia Mazzarò
- Mario Pupella as Mr. Panebianco
- Tony Sperandeo as Frankie Ghost
- Giulio Corso as Tano Beddafazza
