= Nino Frassica =

Italian actor and television personality (born 1950)

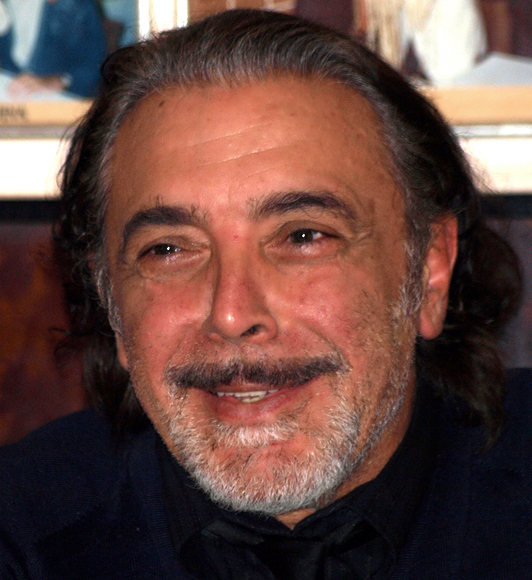
- Nino Frassica in 2012
- Born: Antonino Frassica; 11 December 1950 (age 75); Messina, Italy
- Occupations: Actor; comedian
- Years active: 1970–present
- Height: 1.68 m (5 ft 6 in)
- Spouses: Daniela Conti (m. 1985; div. 1993) Barbara Exignotis (m. 2018)

Antonino "Nino" Frassica (born 11 December 1950) is an Italian actor and comedian.

== Biography and career ==
Born in Messina, Sicily, Frassica is mostly known for his deadpan humour, characterized by absurd jokes he described as a way of "ruining logic and the Italian language". He is considered "a master of nonsense humour". He debuted for Italian television with Renzo Arbore's Quelli della notte (1985), in which he played a semi-illiterate friar. Later, again in collaboration with Arbore, he was given a major role in the surreal quiz show Indietro tutta! (lit. Full speed backwards!, 1987).

Frassica has subsequently featured in numerous comic movies, such as Il Bi e il Ba (1986), and TV shows for Italian television. He plays Marshal Antonio "Nino" Cecchini on the Italian TV series Don Matteo (2000-present). He co-hosted the second night of the Sanremo Music Festival 2025 alongside Bianca Balti, Cristiano Malgioglio and Carlo Conti, and the final of the 2026 festival alongside Conti, Laura Pausini and Giorgia Cardinaletti.

== Filmography ==
=== Film ===
Year	Title	Role(s)	Notes
1983	"FF.SS." – Cioè: "...che mi hai portato a fare sopra a Posillipo se non mi vuoi più bene?"	TeleOttaviano Technician	Cameo appearance
1986	Il Bi e il Ba	Antonino Scannapieco	
1989	Mortacci	Uncle Amilcare	
1991	Vacanze di Natale '91	Rino Calò	
1992	Sognando la California	Antonio Castagna	
1992	Anni 90	Rosario	
1993	Anni 90: Parte II	Tano	
1994	Miracolo italiano	Salvatore / Ernesto	
2000	Sono positivo	Banker	
2000	Le sciamane	Sandro	
2002	Apri gli occhi e sogna	Alfredo	
2002	L'amore di Marja	Man in the Bar	Cameo appearance
2005	Three Days of Anarchy	Dr. Puglisi	
2006	Really SSSupercool: Chapter Two	Turi	
2007	L'abbuffata	Professor	
2007	Viaggio in Italia: Una favola nera	Roses Seller	Cameo appearance
2008	La fidanzata di papà	Nino Patanè	
2008	Se chiudi gli occhi	Inspector Malvezzi	
2008	Un attimo sospesi	Doctor	
2009	Baarìa	Giacomo Bartolotta	
2010	La scomparsa di Patò	Marshal Paolo Giummaro	
2010	The Tourist	Brigadier Mele	
2010	Somewhere	Telegatto Host	Cameo appearance
2011	Lettera da madras	Vincenzo	Short film
2011	Un uomo nuovo	Don Giuseppe	
2012	Workers	Don Ciccio Tartanna	
2012	Breve storia di lunghi tradimenti	Ciro	
2012	Un milione di giorni	Duchino	
2013	Cha cha cha	Dance Competition Presenter	Cameo appearance
2014	Ragazze a mano armata	Nino	
2014	Andiamo a quel paese	The Barber	
2015	Seconda primavera	Maggiari	
2015	Ever Been to the Moon?	Oderzo	
2015	Italiano medio	Head Doctor	Cameo appearance
2015	Babbo Natale non viene da nord	Brigadier	
2016	Forever Young	Priest	
2016	Natale a Londra – Dio salvi la regina	'U Barone	
2017	Omicidio all'italiana	Aldo Lattusa	
2017	No Country for Young Men	Salvatore	
2017	Ninna nanna	Luigi	
2017	Once (In My Life)	The Consierge	Short film
2017	La voce di Fantozzi	Himself	Documentary
2018	Show Dogs	Karma (voice)	Italian dub
2018	One of the Family	Peppino Serranò	
2019	Di tutti i colori	Vladimiro	
2020	Napoli Eden	Himself	Documentary
2021	Genitori vs. influencer	Uncle Delbono	
2021	School of Mafia	Don Turi 'u Appuciaturi	
2022	Improvvisamente Natale	Don Michele	
2023	Amleto è mio fratello	Retired Actor	Cameo appearance
2023	L'estate più calda	Don Carlo	
2023	Io e mio fratello	Bernardo	
2023	Improvvisamente a Natale mi sposo	Don Michele	
2024	Pare parecchio Parigi	Arnaldo Cannistraci	
2024	30 anni (di meno)	Pietro	
2024	Come far litigare mamma e papà	Raffaele Di Nardo	
2024	Sinapsi	Fausto	
2025	Arrivederci tristezza	Carlo	
2026	Still Sexy	Himself	Cameo appearance

=== Television ===
Year	Title	Role(s)	Notes
1998	S.P.Q.R.	Salvatore Pitagora	Main role; 13 episodes
2000–present	Don Matteo	Marshal Antonio Cecchini	Main role; 285 episodes
2001	La crociera	Tony Scalia	Television movie
2002	Il destino ha quattro zampe	Romeo	Television movie
2004	Madre come te	Inspector De Bono	Two-parts television movie
2006–2009	Butta la luna	Mario Ficuzza	Recurring role; 9 episodes
2007	Nati ieri	Giuseppe	Episode: "Controllati a vista"
2008	L'ultimo padrino	Nino Morra	Two-parts television movie
2008–2010	Ho sposato uno sbirro	Sandandro Piccirilli	2 episodes
2009	Inspector Coliandro	Peppe Ramella	Episode: "Il sospetto"
2011	Cugino & cugino	Carmelo Mancuso	Co-lead role; 12 episodes
2012	I Cesaroni	Salvatore Incognito	Episode: "Inutile nascondersi"
2013	La tempesta	Bepi	Television movie
2013	Casa e bottega	Erminio	Television movie
2013–2014	Mario	Pompiero	Recurring role; 5 episodes
2016	Mariottide	Lele Mosina	Main role; 20 episodes
2016	Untraditional	Himself	Episode: "Lo spazio di Silvano"
2016–2017	Complimenti per la connessione	Marshal Antonio Cecchini	Main role; 40 episodes
2016–2018	The Mafia Kills Only in Summer	Stefano Castronuovo / Fra Giacinto	Main role; 20 episodes
2017	Il coraggio di vincere	Marcello	Television movie
2018	The Generi	Game Show Host	Episode: "Quiz"
2020	Io, una giudice popolare al Maxi processo	Alfonso Giordano	Television movie
2020–2021	Fratelli Caputo	Nino Caputo	Lead role; 4 episodes
2025	Un passo dal cielo	Uncle Nino	Episode: "L'uomo dei ghiacci"
2025	Se fossi te	Oscar Mancuso	Main role; 4 episodes
2026	Seduci & scappa	Calogero	Television movie
