= Andy Luotto =

American entertainer and chef

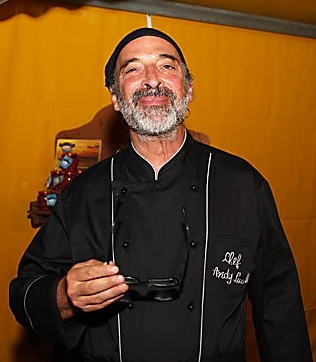
- Andy Luotto
- Born: André Paul Luotto; July 30, 1950 (age 76); New York, U.S.
- Occupations: Actor, comedian, musician, chef, restaurateur, film director
- Years active: 1976-present

André Paul "Andy" Luotto (born 30 July 1950) is an American actor, comedian, musician, chef, and restaurateur. He has resided in Italy since the mid-1970s, where he is a prolific television personality, and is the owner and operator of the Lá restaurant in Rome's Piazza Venezia.

== Biography ==
Born as André Paul Luotto in New York, Luotto graduated in cinematography at the Boston University in 1972, then started working as dubbing voice for Italian films released in the United States. Later Luotto moved to Rome where in 1978 obtained a great success as "fantasista" in the Renzo Arbore's TV-show L'altra domenica.

In 1979 he made his film debut as lead actor of SuperAndy, a bizarre parody of Superman, then started a quite regular career as character actor. In 1983 he wrote, directed and starred Grunt, a film parody of Jean-Jacques Annaud's Quest for Fire.

== Selected filmography ==
- In the Pope's Eye (1980)
- Ski Mistress (1981)
- I carabbimatti (1981)
- "FF.SS." – Cioè: "...che mi hai portato a fare sopra a Posillipo se non mi vuoi più bene?" (1983)
- Grunt! (1983)
- The World of Don Camillo (1983)
- Il mistero di Bellavista (1985)
- Treasure Island in Outer Space (1987)
- Mortacci (1989)
- The Truce (1997)
- Excellent Cadavers (1997)
- Canone inverso - Making Love (2000)
- Household Accounts (2003)
- Pontormo (2004)
- Go Go Tales (2007)
- Il sogno del maratoneta (2012)
- Pinocchio (2012)
- Romeo and Juliet (2014)
- My Name Is Thomas (2018)
