= Vittorio Brumotti =

Italian television presenter and cyclist

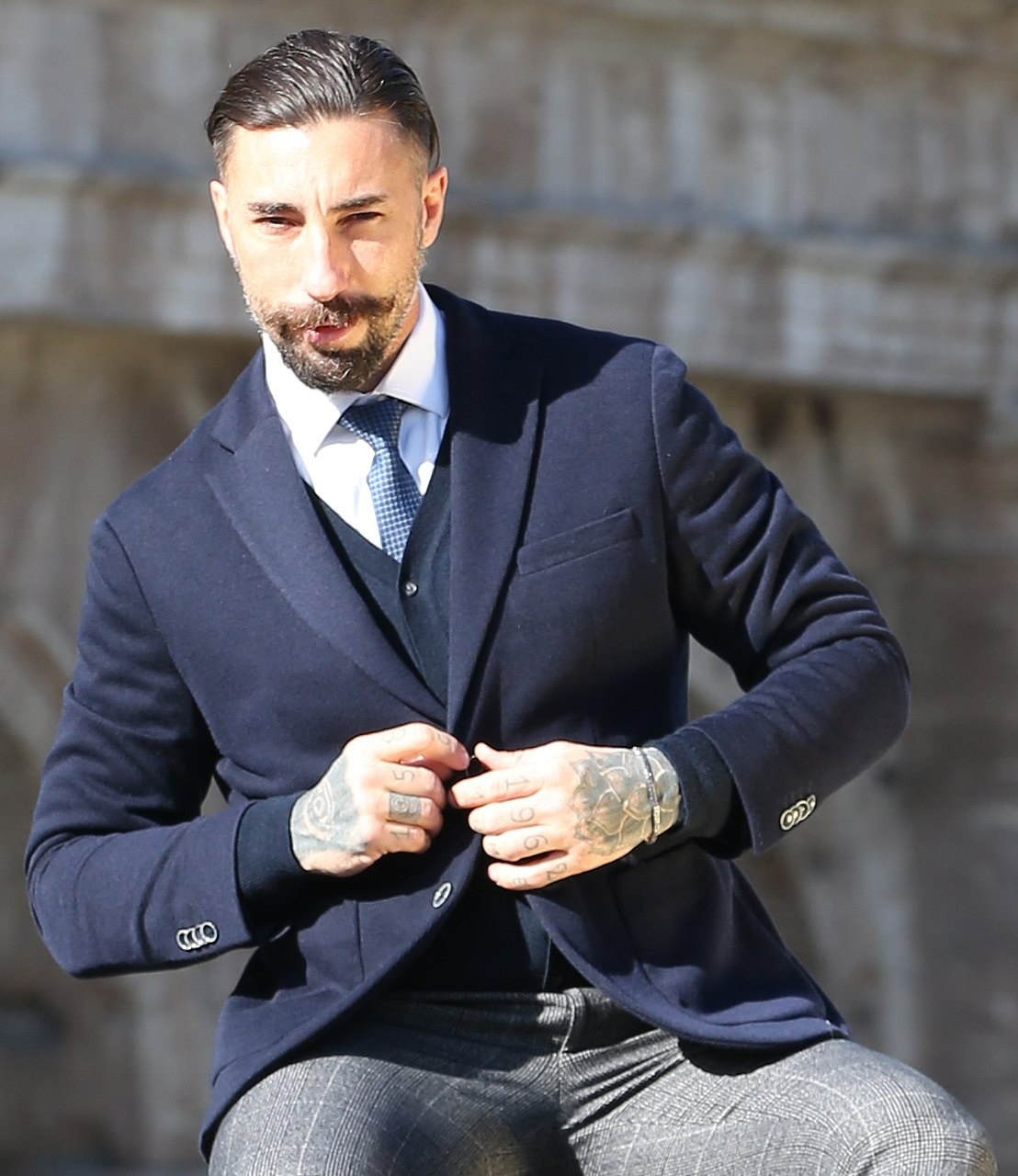
- Brumotti in 2022

Personal information
- Born: 14 June 1980 Finale Ligure, Savona, Italy

Cycling career
- Sport: Cycling
- Discipline: Trials
- Role: Rider

Vittorio Brumotti (born 26 June 1980) is an Italian TV presenter and cyclist, trials champion.

== Biography ==
Born in Finale Ligure to a Ligurian father and a Calabrian mother and currently living in Milan; at eleven years of age Brumotti began to practice bike trials.

He has entered the Guinness World Records ten times thanks to remarkable sporting achievements. On 6 December 2008, at the Bologna Motor Show, he passed 28 bars with the rear wheel of his bicycle and on 17 May 2009 in Sardinia he dived from 17 meters with his bike into the waters in front of the Bue Marino caves in Cala Gonone. Shortly after he returned to Sardinia for a new record: on the top of the natural spire of Punta Caroddi, a peak about 150 meters above sea level, he performed 71 jumps on the rear wheel alone.

His first record was presented to the program Lo show dei record hosted by Barbara D'Urso. In 2012 Vittorio Brumotti obtained the Guinness World Record for having climbed the Burj Khalifa, in Dubai, by bicycle, in exactly 2 hours and 20 minutes. In the same year he was awarded the Premio alla voce contro lo spreco (prize for voice against waste) at the ninth edition of the Leggio d'oro. In 2013, following in the footsteps of his colleague and friend Martyn Ashton, he changed his approach and invented the road bike freestyle, evolving towards riding a normal racing bike.

As a correspondent for the television program Striscia la Notizia, he usually claims parking spaces for the disabled and improperly occupied by those who do not have the right; but he even more actively participates in the fight against crime, openly denouncing (through television) various criminal acts, especially drug dealing. On some occasions he was subjected to attacks by criminal organizations, such as when on 2 December 2017, he was threatened with gunshots and the throwing of a brick during a report on drug dealing in the San Basilio district of Rome, on 9 January. he was attacked together with his television crew by some drug dealers in the square in front of Milan Central Station. On 20 January 2018, to be able to escape unharmed from the Traiano district of Naples he had to be escorted by the carabinieri and on 25 February 2018, in the Zen district of Palermo, where some inhabitants threw a heavy concrete block at him from a balcony.

== Private life ==
Until 2011 he was engaged with the stylist Roberta Armani (Giorgio's nephew). From 2012 to 2017 he was romantically linked to the Sardinian showgirl Giorgia Palmas, with whom he conducted the television program Paperissima Sprint from 2011 to 2014. Since 2018 he has been linked to the heiress Annachiara Zoppas.

== Television programs ==
- Lo show dei record (Canale 5, 2008) – competitor
- Striscia la Notizia (Canale 5, from 2008) – correspondent
- Paperissima Sprint (Canale 5, 2009, 2013–2017, 2019-ongoing)
- Xtreme Kidz (Disney XD, 2010) – tutor
- Colorado (Italia 1, 2011) – guest

== Videography ==
- Brumotti Roadbike Freestyle 2 (2015)
- Vittorio Brumotti Grand Canyon USA (2017)
- 100% Brumotti Ride in Usa (2009)
