= Palermo – Milan One Way =

1995 Italian crime-action film

- Directed by: Claudio Fragasso
- Written by: Rossella Drudi
- Starring: Giancarlo Giannini; Raoul Bova; Ricky Memphis; Francesco Benigno; Romina Mondello; Valerio Mastandrea; Rosalinda Celentano; Tony Sperandeo; Stefania Sandrelli
- Cinematography: Giancarlo Ferrando
- Edited by: Ugo De Rossi
- Music by: Pino Donaggio
- Production companies: Globe Films; Production Group
- Distributed by: 20th Century Fox
- Release date: 8 September 1995
- Country: Italy
- Language: Italian

Palermo – Milan One Way (Italian: Palermo Milano - Solo andata) is a 1995 Italian crime-action film directed by Claudio Fragasso.

The film premiered at the 1995 Venice Film Festival. It won the David di Donatello Awards for best sound and for best producer. In 2007 a sequel film, Milano Palermo - Il ritorno, was released.

== Cast ==
- Giancarlo Giannini as Turi Arcangelo Leofonte
- Raoul Bova as Nino Di Venanzio
- Ricky Memphis as Remo Matteotti
- Romina Mondello as Chiara Leofonte
- Rosalinda Celentano as Paola Terenzi
- Francesco Benigno as Saro Ligresti
- Stefania Sandrelli as Franca Leofonte
- Tony Sperandeo as Marinnà
- Valerio Mastandrea as Tarcisio Proietti
- Paolo Calissano as Valerio Barreca
- Stefania Rocca as Maria Pia Di Meo
