= Sandro Ghiani =

Italian film, stage and television actor (born 1952)

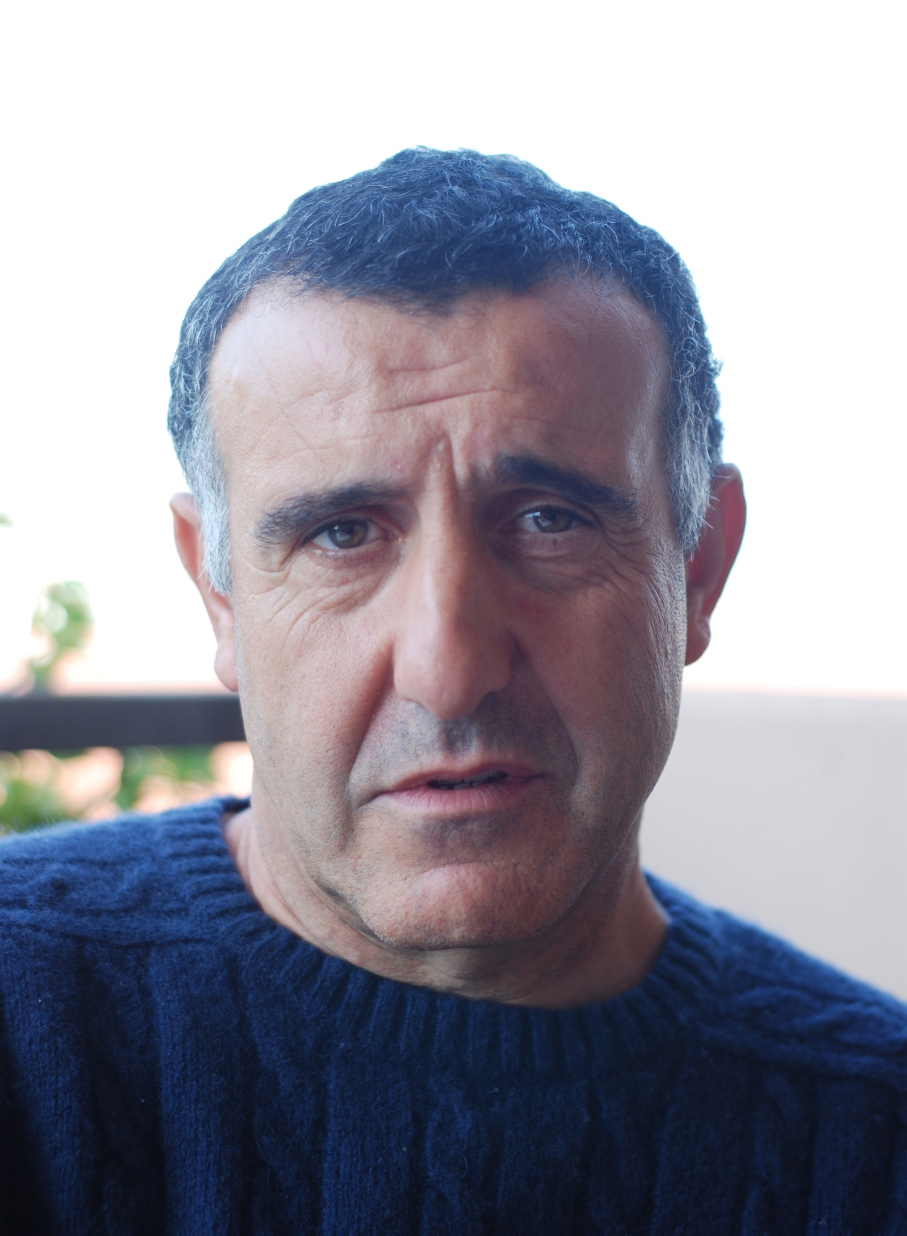
- Born: 12 August 1952 (age 74); Carbonia, Italy
- Occupation: Actor

Sandro Ghiani (Italian pronunciation: [ˈɡjaːni]; born 12 August 1952) is an Italian film, stage and television actor.

== Life and career ==
Born in Carbonia, Sardinia, the son of a postal clerk, Ghiani studied in a seminary, the Institute of Don Orione in Tortona in Piedmont, where, with the first performances at amateur level, he discovered his passion for acting. He then moved to Rome, to pursue a career as a professional actor. Ghiani was mostly active in comedic character roles, often characterized by a strong Sardinian diction. In 2009 Ghiani debuted as a writer with the novel L'angelo della porta accanto, which he wrote together with Susanna Trossero.

== Selected filmography ==
- Zanna Bianca e il grande Kid (1977)
- Velvet Hands (1979)
- Sugar, Honey and Pepper (1980)
- Fun Is Beautiful (1980)
- Passion of Love (1981)
- Asso (1981)
- Fracchia la belva umana (1981)
- Spaghetti House (1982)
- An Ideal Adventure (1982)
- Don't Play with Tigers (1982)
- A Boy and a Girl (1983)
- Chewingum (1984)
- Madman at War (1985)
- Soldati - 365 all'alba (1987)
- Tre colonne in cronaca (1990)
- Vacanze di Natale '91 (1991)
- Cain vs. Cain (1993)
- Le nuove comiche (1994)
- Non lasciamoci più (1999)
- Zora the Vampire (2000)
- Bartali: The Iron Man (2006)
- Oggi sposi (2009)
