= Mario Pupella =

Italian actor and stage director (1945–2023)

- Born: 10 April 1945; Castelvetrano, Trapani, Italy
- Died: 22 January 2023 (aged 77); Palermo, Italy

Mario Pupella (10 April 1945 – 22 January 2023) was an Italian actor and stage director.

== Biography ==
Born in Castelvetrano, Pupella made his professional debut on stage in a rendition of Luigi Pirandello's Henry IV. Mainly active on stage, he got his first film major role in 2002, in Roberta Torre's Angela. He was also a stage director, and served as artistic director of several theaters in Palermo, namely Teatro Europa, Teatro Crystal and Teatro Sant'Eugenio.

He died on 22 January 2023, at the age of 77.

== Selected filmography ==
- Angela (2002)
- I, the Other (2007)
- I Viceré (2007)
- The Sicilian Girl (2008)
- La matassa (2009)
- Salvo (2013)
- At War with Love (2016)
- Quel bravo ragazzo (2016)
- Scappo a casa (2019)
- Padrenostro (2020)
- School of Mafia (2021)
