= I'm Going to Live by Myself =

- Italian theatrical release poster by Enzo Sciotti
- Directed by: Marco Risi
- Written by: Enrico Vanzina; Marco Risi; Jerry Calà
- Produced by: Claudio Bonivento
- Starring: Jerry Calà
- Cinematography: Giuseppe Maccari
- Edited by: Raimondo Crociani
- Music by: Manuel De Sica
- Release date: 9 December 1982 (Italy)
- Running time: 98 minutes
- Country: Italy
- Language: Italian

I'm Going to Live by Myself (Italian: Vado a vivere da solo) is a 1982 Italian comedy film. It marked the feature film debut of Marco Risi. The film achieved a "cult" status and generated a 2008 sequel, Torno a vivere da solo.

== Plot ==
Milan, Italy early 1980s. A college student is finally able to rent a loft and live alone. But freedom so desired was marred by a thousand misfortunes, until the arrival in his life of a beautiful French, who will love and marry.

== Cast ==
- Jerry Calà as Giacomino
- Elvire Audray as Françoise
- Francesco Salvi as "Telefono amico" friend
- Franz Di Cioccio as landlord
- Lando Buzzanca as Giuseppe
- Elsa Vazzoler as Giacomino's mother
- Stefano Altieri as Giacomino's father
- Renato Scarpa as the Professor

== Release ==
The film was released in Italy on December 9, 1982

== See also ==
- List of Italian films of 1982
