= The Whores =

1994 film

- Film poster
- Directed by: Aurelio Grimaldi
- Written by: Aurelio Grimaldi; Claudia Florio
- Produced by: Maurizio Tedesco
- Starring: Ida Di Benedetto
- Cinematography: Maurizio Calvesi
- Edited by: Mauro Bonanni
- Release date: June 1994
- Running time: 85 minutes
- Country: Italy
- Languages: Italian; Sicilian

The Whores (Sicilian: Le buttane) is a 1994 Italian drama film directed by Aurelio Grimaldi. It was entered into the 1994 Cannes Film Festival.

== Plot ==
Liuccia and Blu Blu "beat" on the street; Veronica and Minuccia practice in a clandestine brothel, Orlanda at her home; Maurizio has as a client a wealthy mature man (whom he will kill); the trans Kim advertises herself through newspaper ads. Their lives, their profession, the relationships with their customers, the inconveniences, the dramas.

== Cast ==
- Ida Di Benedetto as Orlanda
- Luigi Maria Burruano as Mario
- Adriano Chiaramida as Wealthy man
- Vincenzo Crivello as Santino
- Guia Jelo as Liuccia Bonuccia
- Marco Leonardi as Maurizio
- Maurizio Nicolosi as Maurizio u Catanisi
- Paola Pace as Veronica
- Alessandra Di Sanzo as Kim
- Lucia Sardo as Milu
- Sandra Sindoni as Blu Blu
- Salvatore Termini as Waiter
- Alfredo Li Bassi as Thug

== Soundtrack ==
Aurelio Grimaldi also composed the music for the film.
