= Anna Falchi =

Finnish-Italian model and actress (born 1972)

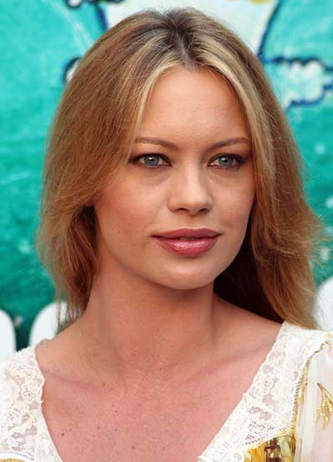
- Falchi in 2007
- Born: Anna Kristiina Palomäki; 22 April 1972 (age 54); Tampere, Finland
- Occupations: Actress; television presenter
- Spouse: Stefano Ricucci (m. 2005; div. 2007)
- Children: 1
- Modeling information
- Height: 1.78 m (5 ft 10 in)
- Hair color: Blonde
- Eye color: Blue, green
- Website: annafalchi.net

Anna Falchi (Italian pronunciation: [ˈanna ˈfalki]; born Anna Kristiina Palomäki; 22 April 1972) is a Finnish-Italian actress, television presenter, and former model.

== Early life ==
Anna Kristiina Palomäki was born in Tampere, Finland, the daughter of an Italian father, Benito (Tito) Falchi, and Finnish mother Kaarina. She has a brother, Saro, and a half-brother in Sweden, Peter (by her father). In 1978, at the age of six, she moved to Italy with her family, where she started her career as a model.

== Career ==
Falchi participated in Miss Italia 1989. Falchi first appeared on television in a commercial for an Italian bank in 1992. The ad starred Paolo Villaggio, and was directed by the celebrated Federico Fellini. This helped her launch a film career, starting with Nel continente nero (in the black Continent) in 1993.

Falchi appeared in many films since, including the 1994 fantasy movie The Dragon Ring, the 1997 film La principessa e il povero and the 2005 comedy Nessun messaggio in segreteria. She has also been a popular television personality, hosting various specials on Italian television. Falchi is lesser known in the English-speaking world. Some know her for the lead female role in the film Dellamorte Dellamore, which was released in the US as Cemetery Man. In 1995, Falchi briefly explored the music industry, recording the Finnish dance single "Pium Paum (Vipula Vapula)".

In 2001, Falchi was a guest on the Italian late-night show Satyricon, during which she satirized one of the appearances of Madonna on Late Show with David Letterman during which Madonna jokingly teased Letterman for refusing to smell her panties. Falchi actually took off her red panties on stage, and the host, Daniele Luttazzi, went all the way to smell them. This caused some scandal in Italy.

Since 2021, she has been a co-host for the long-running Italian show, Fatti Vostri.

== Personal life ==
Falchi was a Protestant but she converted to the Catholic Church. From 1994 to 1996, she was in a relationship with Fiorello. Falchi was married to Stefano Ricucci from 2005 to 2007. She had a daughter with Denny Montesi in 2010. She dated Andrea Ruggieri from 2011 to 2022.

== Filmography ==
=== Film ===
Year	Title	Role(s)	Notes
1992	Nel continente nero	Irene	
1993	Anni 90: Parte II	Lola	
1994	S.P.Q.R.: 2,000 and a Half Years Ago	Poppea	
1994	Miracolo italiano	Maria	Segment: "Quarto episodio"
1994	L'Affaire	Mathilda / Ángelina	
1994	Cemetery Man	She	
1995	Celluloide	Maria Michi	
1995	Snowball	Elena	
1996	Giovani e belli	Zorilla	
1998	Paparazzi	Herself	Cameo appearance
2000	Body Guards	Herself	
2002	Operazione rosmarino	Silvia	
2005	Sorry, You Can't Get Through!	Sonya	
2008	L'allenatore nel pallone 2	Gioia Desideri	
2008	Un'estate al mare	Cosima	
2009	The Cézanne Affair	Valeria Giordano	
2011	Box Office 3D: The Filmest of Films	Bella	
2012	Roma nuda	Nadia	
2015	Silent Night	Francesca	Short film
2019	The Tracker	Hannah	

=== Television ===
Year	Title	Role(s)	Notes
1989	Miss Italia	Herself / Contestant	Annual beauty contest Winner – Miss Cinema
1993	Casa Vianello	Anna Marini	Recurring role; 5 episodes
1995	The Dragon Ring	Princess Desideria	Television movie
1995	Sanremo Music Festival 1995	Herself / Co-host	Annual music festival
1996	Donna sotto le stelle	Herself / Co-host	Fashion event
1996–1997	Luna Park	Herself / Host (only on Monday)	Game show (season 3)
1997	La principessa e il povero	Princess Mirabella	Television movie
1997, 2006	Zecchino d'Oro	Herself / Co-host	Children's singing competition
1998–1999	Domenica in	Herself / Co-host	Talk show (season 23)
1999	Caraibi	Livia Cornero	Main role
2000	La casa delle beffe	Luisa / Loredana	Television movie
2005	Gli occhi dell'amore	Elena Angeli	Television movie
2007	Ballando con le Stelle	Herself / Contestant	Runner-up (season 4)
2009	Buona la prima!	Anna	Sketch comedy
2009	Piper	Sabrina Amadori	Main role
2012–2013	Superbrain	Herself / Opinionist	Game show
2013	Jump!	Herself / Contestant	Reality competition
2015	Techetechetè	Narrator	Episode: "Belle figure"
2015–2016	Wedding Fashion World	Herself / Host	Reality show
2018–2019	Anna e i suoi fornelli	Herself / Host	Cooking program
2020	C'è tempo per…	Herself / Host	Talk show
2021–present	I fatti vostri	Herself / Host	Talk show (season 31-present)
2022	Alessandro Borghese: Celebrity Chef	Herself / Contestant	Season 1, episode 41
2024	Un'estate italiana	Herself / Host	Variety show

=== Music videos ===
Year	Title	Artist(s)	Notes
1993	"Due"	Raf	
