= Anni 90 =

- Directed by: Enrico Oldoini
- Written by: Liliana Betti; Enrico Oldoini; Giovanni Veronesi
- Produced by: Luigi De Laurentiis; Aurelio De Laurentiis
- Starring: Christian De Sica; Massimo Boldi; Ezio Greggio; Nino Frassica; Andrea Roncato
- Cinematography: Sergio Salvati
- Edited by: Raimondo Crociani
- Music by: Giovanni Nuti; Riccardo Galardini
- Distributed by: FilmAuro
- Release date: October 30, 1992
- Running time: 95 minutes
- Country: Italy
- Language: Italian
- Box office: $6 million (Italy)

Anni 90 (lit. 'The Nineties') is a 1992 Italian sketch comedy film directed by Enrico Oldoini.

An anthological sequel entitled Anni 90: Parte II was released in 1993.

== Cast ==
- Christian De Sica as Cesare Proietti / Lando Marcelli
- Massimo Boldi as Ugo Bossi / Massimo / Walter Mongini
- Ezio Greggio as the ad guy / psychologist
- Nino Frassica as Rosario / Nino / Brigadier / man in the tube
- Andrea Roncato as Felice / Andrea / Augusto / man in the tube
- Francesco Benigno as Salvatore / Caputo / Carabiniere / tough guy
- Nadia Rinaldi as Cleopatra Valentini
- Flavio Bucci as Professor Moira
- Valeria D'Obici as Neris Bossi
- Maurizio Mattioli as Maurizio
- Guido Nicheli as the swinger
- Nicola De Buono as the office manager
- Fabiana Udenio as Daniela
- Leo Valli as Gino Renda
- Laura Valci as Laura
- Pietro Ghislandi as the priest
- Daniela Piperno as Moana
- Francesca Colombo as the secretary
- Maurizio Prollo as Toni
- Federico Rizzo as Luigino

== Reception ==
It opened in Italy on 36 screens and grossed 1.2 billion lire, finishing second to Lethal Weapon 3 at the box office for the week. In its third week of release it reached number one at the Italian box office and was there for two weeks. It went on to gross $6 million, the fifth highest-grossing Italian film for the year in Italy and the 12th overall.
