= It's the Law (film) =

- Film poster
- Italian: L'ora legale
- Directed by: Ficarra e Picone
- Written by: Ficarra e Picone; Edoardo De Angelis
- Produced by: Attilio De Razza
- Starring: Salvatore Ficarra; Valentino Picone; Leo Gullotta; Vincenzo Amato
- Edited by: Claudio Di Mauro
- Distributed by: Medusa Film
- Release date: 19 January 2017
- Running time: 95 min
- Country: Italy
- Language: Italian
- Box office: US$11.5 million

It's the Law (Italian: L'ora legale, lit. 'The legal hour', Italian for "daylight saving time") is a 2017 Italian comedy film, directed and starred by Ficarra e Picone. It was released in Italy by Medusa Film on 19 January 2017.

== Plot ==
In Pietrammare, a Sicilian town, a new mayor is to be elected. The candidates are the former mayor, a mafia puppet hated by the community, and a mild professor, who wants to finally bring honesty to the country. The latter candidate wins the election, and, with the help of his relatives Salvatore and Valentino, begins to implement his program of legality. Unfortunately this program of "civilisation" only exasperates all the citizens, with fines being charged for various infractions and taxes being increased. Eventually, this also involves Salvo and Valentino, who see their bar being closed because the kiosk was abusive. For this reason, the couple organizes a plan to defame the mayor, in order to start up a parliamentary inquiry, forcing the mayor to resign.

== Cast ==
- Salvatore Ficarra as Salvo
- Valentino Picone as Valentino
- Vincenzo Amato as Pierpaolo Natoli
- Tony Sperandeo as Gaetano Patanè
- Leo Gullotta as Don Raffaele
- Sergio Friscia as Gianni
- Antonio Catania as Michele
- Gaetano Bruno as the Carabiniere
- Eleonora De Luca as Betty Natoli
- Ersilia Lombardo as Francesca Natoli
- Alessia D'Anna as Maria
- Francesco Benigno as Vittorio
- Antonio Pandolfo as the greengrocer
- Marcello Mordino as the man with the dog
- Alessandro Roja as the Roman politician
- Vincenzo Ferrera as the worker
- Alessandro Aiello as Pinuccio
- Paride Benassai as Marcello
- Mary Cipolla as Giovanna

== Reception ==
=== Box office ===
The film was number-one in Italy on its opening weekend, with US$3.48 million.

=== Critical response ===
The film being acclaimed by Italian critics.
