= E adesso sesso =

2001 film by Carlo Vanzina

- Directed by: Carlo Vanzina
- Written by: Enrico Vanzina; Carlo Vanzina
- Produced by: Vittorio Cecchi Gori; Rita Cecchi Gori
- Starring: Elena Russo; Maurizio Mattioli; Sergio Solli; Ciro Esposito
- Cinematography: Duccio Cimatti
- Edited by: Luca Montanari
- Music by: Germano Mazzocchetti
- Release date: 2001
- Running time: 94 min
- Country: Italy
- Language: Italian

E adesso sesso (And now sex) is a 2001 Italian anthology comedy film written and directed by Carlo Vanzina. It consists of eight segments, set in different Italian cities, all sharing sex as main theme.

== Plot ==
In Italy there's the 2000s, bringing fresh air. In several episodes, Carlo Vanzina offers a glimpse of the typical behavior of the Italian character of the middle-class who is struggling with beautiful women, betrayal, love affairs, and much more.

Escape of Love

Gennaro, a young man from Naples, and his lover Assunta Potito, a married woman with four children, flee their monotonous lives to continue their love affair. Disapproving, Gennaro’s parents and Assunta’s husband start appealing on television for the couple to return to their families. Saddened by the thought of leaving her beloved children, Assunta returns to her village with Gennaro. After reconciling with their families live on TV, Assunta signs an autograph for a young man, giving him her phone number—showing she hasn’t lost her passion for “toy boys.”

Black Venus

In Turin, Romeo is a factory worker tired of his family life. One night, on his way home buying cigarettes, he encounters a group of prostitutes. Seeking new experiences, he invites the beautiful Brigitte to join him and spends several nights with her. When his wife discovers the affair, she kicks him out. Romeo decides to buy Brigitte from her pimp to stay with her forever. However, after six months, he finds himself in the same situation as before, dependent on his in-laws and feeling unnoticed. The cycle repeats as he goes out again to buy cigarettes.

Voyeurs

In Verona, five boys gather at a house using telescopes and binoculars to watch the window across the street. They seem to be watching a woman’s striptease, but just as she’s about to remove her thong, her husband interrupts and sends her away because she is blocking the TV. It turns out both the husband and the boys wanted to watch the Hellas Verona football match. The boys cheer the husband’s action and celebrate their team.

SMS (Short Message Service)

At Olbia-Costa Smeralda Airport, Barbara, a girl from Rome, meets Matteo, a boy from Bologna. They start a long-distance romance through SMS. Barbara sends messages to Matteo, who lives in a room plastered with posters of Bologna football club and his favorite band Lùnapop, whose music video for "Qualcosa di grande" he watches. Their relationship continues for months exclusively by phone, until they break up and later begin new relationships also solely via SMS.

Calendar Beauties

In Sicily, a group of married men regularly meet at the barber’s to look at risqué calendars. To get back at them for their habit, their wives arrange for a new calendar to be sold at the newsstand—one featuring the wives themselves. Fearful that the calendar will spread across the island, the men rush to all Sicilian provinces to retrieve the copies. However, the women had actually published only one copy, which they destroy before going to confess in church.

Internet Site

Cesare works at the Cineland cinema in Ostia and recently started dating Katia. A friend shows Cesare a swingers’ website, and curious, he contacts a couple from Prato for a weekend meeting. When the swingers arrive at Cesare’s house, they explain the "rules of coupling" to Cesare and Katia. Suddenly, Cesare’s grandmother returns home, and what was supposed to be a wild encounter turns into a big feast with pasta, beans, and lamb. After the meal, the grandmother challenges the swingers to a card game, partnering with her beloved grandson and repeatedly winning.

Voyeurs Part II

Set in Milan (although actually filmed in Pomezia), employees at a company notice two girls undressing at the window opposite. During the striptease, the girls reveal a poster displaying a bank account number and the amount to pay to keep watching.

A Hard Life

Isidoro, a money-conscious policeman from Ascoli Piceno, and his housewife wife Adalgisa live on a single income and struggle to make ends meet. To earn extra money, Adalgisa acts in amateur adult films, telling her husband she works occasionally as a domestic helper. One day, trying to spice up their relationship, Isidoro buys an adult film from a Dutch catalog to watch with his wife—but realizes that the female lead is Adalgisa herself. Disapproving of her work, he throws her out, and she returns to her mother’s house. After three months apart, they meet again on a film set because Isidoro has decided to become a porn actor too, realizing that without his wife’s "extra income," he cannot pay the bills. During their reunion, Isidoro proposes they produce and star in adult films together at home.

== Cast ==
- Elena Russo: Assunta Potito
- Adolfo Margiotta: Romeo
- Youma Diakite: Brigitte
- Antonello Fassari: Padre di Barbara
- Emanuela Rossi: Madre di Barbara
- Virginie Marsan: Barbara
- Alessio Modica: Matteo
- Luigi Maria Burruano: Barone
- Tony Sperandeo: Don Calogero
- Guia Jelo: Anna
- Max Giusti: Cesare
- Anna Longhi: Nonna di Cesare
- Éva Henger: Spogliarellista alla finestra
- Francesca Nunzi: Adalgisa
- Angelo Russo: Antonio
- Paolo Triestino: Isidoro
- Antonio Allocca: Doorman
