= 1990 in Italian television =

This is a list of Italian television related events from 1990.

== Events ==
=== Rai ===
- 8 January: during the afternoon show Love is a wonderful thing, an anonymous phone call gives the host Sandra Milo the (fake) news of a car accident to her son; the actress cries and faints live. The video of the scene is still viral today.
- 29 January: RAI-SAT begins the experimental broadcastings.
- 1 February: the Catholic Gianni Pasquarelli becomes RAI general director; he gives to the estate a more conservative and pro-government direction.
- 12 February : on the magazine Mixer, the journalist Giovanni Minoli broadcasts an interview with a magistrate and a video, which should prove that republic won the 1946 institutional referendum thanks an electoral fraud. In the last minutes of the program, however, Minoli reveals that everything shown previously had been staged. This explicitly false scoop arouses a lot of controversy.
- 3 March: the Pooh win the Sanremo festival, presented by Johnny Dorelli and Gabriella Carlucci, with Uomini soli. The verdict is not a surprise; already the night before, on Italia 1, Gianni Ippoliti had led a debate on the theme Why the Pooh had won?
- 5 May - Italy wins the 35th Eurovision Song Contest in Zagreb, SR Croatia, Yugoslavia. The winning song is "Insieme: 1992", performed by Toto Cutugno.
- 5 June: the new RAI seat in Saxa Rubra is inaugurated.
- 2 July: TG1 broadcasts an interview to the self-styled CIA agent Richard Brenneke, who accuses (without providing evidence) George H. W. Bush of having financed the P2 lodge when he was director of the CIA. The interview provoked a diplomatic incident between Italy and the United States and the resignation of the TG1 director Nuccio Fava, replaced by Bruno Vespa.
- 3 July: the match Italy-Argentina, semifinal of the 1990 FIFA World Cup, is the most seen program of the year (and of the whole Auditel history), with 27,6 million viewers. RAI follows the tournament with a great abundance of means and programs, obtaining very high ratings but more modest results from a professional point of view.
- 7 July: from the Baths of Caracalla in Rome, RAI broadcasts in worldwide vision the first concert of the Three Tenors (Carreras, Domingo and Pavarotti), directed by Zubin Metha.
- December 28: on the eve of the Gulf War, RAI Director General Pasquarelli forbids the airing of a Bruno Vespa's interview to Saddam Hussein, with the official justification of not embarrassing the Italian government. The censorship is strongly criticized by public opinion, and the interview goes on air on January 11.

=== Finivest ===
In 1990, the approval of the Mammì law (by the Minister of Telecommunications, the republican Oscar Mammì), regulating private television, provokes a bitter political clash between the supporters of Fininvest (the Andreotti government and the PSI) and its opponents (the PCI and the DC left). The issue of the commercial breaks in films is particularly controversial, and sees the intervention of intellectuals and directors.

- 22 March: the Senate, debating the Mammì law, approves a PCI amendment severely limiting commercial breaks in films and stage works. The government suspends the application of the rule.
- 15 May - The first episode of The voice of conscience is scheduled on Italia 1; it’s a program based on complaints by the viewers of episodes of malpractice. The wave was preceded by a pounding advertising campaign and harsh press controversies, with charges of incitement to inform. At the time of airing, the host Gianni Ippoliti reveals how the alleged program was a provocative fake, and broadcasts a simple talk-sho.
- 26 July: five ministers belonging to the Christian Democrat left (including Sergio Mattarella) resign in protest against the Mammì law, judged too favorable to Silvio Berlusconi.
- 6 August: the Mammì law is approved; it is also called the "photocopy law" because it essentially legalizes the situation already existing in fact. The right to own three national channels and to broadcast live is granted to Finivest; in exchange, to Silvio Berlusconi some limitations in the press and pay-tv fields are imposed.

=== Other channels ===
- 21 May: Wanna Marchi, known for her picturesque teleshopping of algae-based cosmetics produced by herself, is arrested for fraudulent bankruptcy.
- October: the Gruppo Ferruzzi, led by Raul Gardini, buys from Roberto Marinho the 40% of TMC shares and gets the control of the network.
- 4 November: Tele+ is born, it’s the first Italian pay-tv, owned in partnership by the film producer Vittorio Cecchi Gori and the German tycoon Leo Kirch (Silvio Berlusconi had to sell his shares because the Mammì law). The three channels (Tele+1, cinema, Tele+2, sport, Tele+3, culture) until June 1991 were free. to air

== Awards ==
7. Telegatto award, for the season 1989–1990.

- Show of the year: The Bethrothed.
- Man and woman of the year: Corrado and Donatella Raffai; Sergio Castellitto and Luca Barbareschi (as year’s revelations).
- Best TV movie: E se poi se ne vanno?
- Best miniseries: Vendetta: Secrets of a Mafia bride.
- Best serial: Classe di ferro (for Italy), Derrick (for abroad).
- Best telenovela: Topazio.
- Best quiz: Telemike.
- Best game show: Tra moglie e marito
- Best variety: Il caso Sanremo
- Best satirical show: Striscia la notizia.
- Best talk show: Maurizio Costanzo show.
- Best Music show: Una rotonda sul mare.
- Best magazine: Terre vicine.
- Best sport magazine: Calciomania.
- Best cultural magazine : Alla ricerca dell’arca.
- Best show for children: Big!.
- Best spot: Jeans Levi’s
- Special awards: Chi l’ha visto? (for the service TV), The young and the restless, Deejay Television (Best music show of the decades), Mr. Roberto Baldi (reader of Sorrisi e Canzoni), Sylvester Stallone (for the cinema in TV) and Ed Asner (for Lou Grant).

== Debuts ==
=== Rai ===
==== Serials ====
- Pronto soccorso (Emergency department) – medical drama, with Ferruccio and Claudio Amendola, directed by Francesco Massaro; 2 seasons.

==== Variety ====
- I fatti vostri (or Piazza grande) – by Michele Guardì, a mixture of variety, game and talk show, set in a virtual village square, hosted by Frabrizio Frizzi, Giancarlo Magalli and many others; still on the air. The program, broadcast at noon and aimed at the popular public, obtained high ratings but was criticized for the excessive use of pitiful cases.
- Telethon (Italian edition), promoted by Susanna Agnelli, again on air.
- Circo massimo (Circus Maximus) – summer circus show, with various host, lasted till 2017.
- Stasera mi butto (Tonight I have a go) – talent show of impressionists (later extended to other categories), directed by Pier Francesco Pingitore; 4 seasons (the first is hosted by Gigi Sabani, the most famous Italian impressionist of the time). The show reveals comic actors as Giorgio Panariello, Neri Marcorè and Max Giusti.
- Raffaella Venerdì, Sabato e Domenica... Raffaella Carrà returns in Rai with a show for the week-end mixing various genres (talent, variety, the talk show) with the singers Sabrina Salerno and Scialpi and the columnist Vittorio Sgarbi as constant guests. In the second season, the Friday night episode is deleted and the program is renamed Ricomincio da due.
- Scrupoli (then, Scrupoli/senza scrupoli) – talk show about sentimental and sexual matters, hosted by Enza Sampò; 3 seasons.
- Rock cafè – daily column about pop music and youth culture; 3 seasons.

==== News and educational ====
- Mi manda Lubrano (later, Mi manda Rai tre) – hosted by Antonio Lubrano and others, service program for the cosnumers and victims of scams protection; again on air.
- Italia ore 6 (Italy, 6PM) – custom magazine hosted by Emanuela Falcetti; 2 seasons.
- Babele – books magazine, hosted by Corrado Augias; 4 seasons.
- Ambiente Italia – magazine about ecology, care of TGR; lasted till 2016.
- Prima della prima (Before the premiere) – magazine showing the rehearsal of an opera, lasted till 2016.

=== Fininvest ===
==== Variety ====
- Paperissima by Antonio Ricci, hosted by Lorella Cuccarini, Marco Columbro and many others; 18 seasons. It shows both bloopers by public figures and amateur footage of funny domestic accidents and is one of the biggest public successes of the Fininvest network. The summer edition (Paperissima sprint), conducted by Gabibbo, consisting only of amateur films, is still on the air.
- Scene da un matrimonio (Scenes from a marriage) – hosted by Davide Mengacci, it’s one of the first Italian reality shows, showing the wedding of two ordinary people, from the preparation to the ceremony; 10 seasons.
- La verità (The truth) – Italian version of To tell the truth, hosted by Marco Balestri; 5 seasons.
- Evviva l’allegria (Long live the joy) – New Year’s show for the children, hosted by Gerry Scotti and then by Paolo Bonolis; 2 editions.
- Top Venti – hit parade, hosted by Emanuela Foliero; 3 seasons.

==== Sport ====
- Mai dire gol (Never say goal) – by Gialappa's band; 11 seasons. The show reuses the footage of other sport programs, with the trio's voiceover mocking pitilessly football players, coaches and journalists; later, it becomes a real variety, with the sketches of comic actors as Teo Teocoli and Aldo, Giovanni & Giacomo and the presence of showgirls as Elen Hidding and Simona Ventura.
- L’appello del martedì (The Tuesaday appeal) – sports talk show, repeating the format of RAI’s Il processo del luned’, hosted by Maurizio Mosca and later by Massimo De Luca; 5 seasons.
- Pressing – Fininvest version of La Domenica soprtiva, hosted by Marino Bartoletti, Raimondo Vianello and others; again on air (but with a long breaking from 1999 to 2018).

=== Other channels ===
- Galagoal (later Goleada, TMC) – sport magazine, hosted by Alba Parietti, made a star by the program, Josè Altafini, Massimo Caputi and various others; 11 seasons. Its mark is the ample space given to female presenters (beside Parietti,Carolina Morace and Marina Colombari) (TMC).
- A pranzo con Wilma (At lunch with Wilma) – cooking show hosted by Wilma De Angelis; 3 seasons. (TMC)
- Le altre notti (The Other Nights) – erotic show, with soft-core clips and salacious comments by Santo Versace's voiceover, 2 seasons (Italia 7).
- Money – economy magazine, again on air (Odeon TV)

=== International ===
- 25 September - (Japan) / (Netherlands) Alfred J. Kwak (Italia 1) (1989-1990)
- (France) / (Canada) Babar (Rai 2) (1989-1991)
- USA The bold and the beautiful (RAI 2)

== Television shows ==
=== RAI ===
==== Drama ====
- I ragazzi di via Panisperna (Via Panisperna boys) – by Gianni Amelio, with Andrea Prodan (Ettore Majorana), Ennio Fantstichini (Enrico Fermi) and Laura Morante (Laura Capon) in 2 parts; distributed also in a theatrical version.
- Il colore della vittoria (The color of victory) – by Vittorio De Sisti, highly fictionalized re-enactment of the Italian victory at the 1934 FIFA World Cup, with Adalberto Maria Merli (Vittorio Pozzo) and Claudio Amendola (Attilio Ferraris).
- Bianco e nero (Black and white) – drama about racism, by Fabrizio Laurenti.
- Passi d’amore (Love steps) – by Sergio Sollima, with Alessandra Martines; melodrama set in the world of classical ballet.

===== Mystery =====
- Un cane sciolto (A loose dog) by Giorgio Capitani, with Sergio Castellitto and Nancy Brilli; in Naples, a courageous magistrate investigates a cold case (the death of a girl). The film has two sequels.
- Non aprite all’uomo nero (Don’t open to the black man) – thriller by Giulio Questi, with Aurore Clement and Giuliano Gemma. A psychoanalyst investigates the suicide of one of her patients.
- Senza scampo (No way out) – thriller by Paolo Poeti, starring Kim Rossi Stuart. A young man, accused of the murder of his girlfriend, is hunted by justice and the real killers.
- Una prova d’innocenza (Proof of innocence) – by Tonino Valeri, with Enrico Montesano in his only dramatic role. A priest has to exonerate an innocent person without violating the seal of confession.

==== Miniseries ====
- I promessi sposi – parody of Manzoni's novel The Betrothed, with the trio Marchesini-Solenghi-Lopez (also directors); the three actors play all the characters, save some cameos by TV stars; in 5 episodes. The classic novel is the pretext for a crazy satire of any conceivable TV and film genre. The show gets more public and critic success than the serious version, broadcast few months before.
- A violent life – by Giacomo Battiato, from the Benvenuto Cellini's autobiography, with Wadeck Stanczak (Cellini), Max von Sydow (Pope Clemens VII) and Ben Kingsley; 3 episodes. Distributed also in a theatrical version.
- A season of giants – by Jerry London, biopic about the youth of Michelangelo Buonarroti (played by Mark Frankel), with F. Murray Abraham (Pope Julius II) and Ornella Muti; 3 episodes.
- La piovra 5 – Il cuore del problema (The hearth of the matter) – by Luigi Perelli, with Vittorio Mezzogiorno, Patricia Millardet and Remo Girone; 5 episodes. After the killing of the superintendent Cattani, a female judge and a retired policeman carry on his fight against the Sicilian mafia.
- Un bambino in fuga (An escaping child) – by Mario Caiano, with Anne Canovas; 3 episodes. Inspired by a true story; the wife of a “Ndrangheta boss fights to save her children from the law of feud and revenge. It has a sequel (An escaping child, three years later).

==== Serials ====
- Il giudice istruttore (The examining magistrate) – by Florestano Vancini, with Erland Josephson, Vittorio Gassman and Luca Zingaretti; inspired by the life of Ferdinando Imposimato.
- Aquile (Eagles) – by Ninì Salerno, with Federica Moro. Propaganda serial for the Italian Air Force, with a cadet of the Pozzuoli Air Academy as protagonist.
- Villa Arzilla – directed by Gigi Proietti, with Marisa Merlini, Caterina Boratto and Ernesto Calindri; sit-com set in a retirement home.

==== Variety ====
- Il caso Sanremo (The Sanremo case) – history of the Sanremo festival in form of a parodic trial, with Renzo Arbore, Lino Banfi and several singers as guest stars.
- Gran premio - talent-show, hosted by Pippo Baudo (returning in RAI after an unlucky experience in Fininvest)
- Scusate l’interruzione (Sorry for the break) – satirical variety parodying the talk-shows (fake publicity spots included), hosted by Serena Dandini.
- Schegge di radio a colori (Radio fragments in colors) – care of Gloria De Antoni and Oreste de Fornari; replies of classical radio shows, with a fixed image on video.
- Club 92 - hosted by Gigi Proietti and Giancarlo Magalli.

==== News and educational ====
- La mia guerra (My war) – by Paolo Cazzara, with Enza Sampò and Leo Benvenuti; reportage in 7 episodes about the Second World War in Italy as lived by the civilians, with several eyewitness accounts.
- La macchina meravigliosa (The wonderful machine) – documentary series by Piero Angela about the human body; the journalist moves among the various organs, reconstructed by computer with cutting-edge techniques.

==== For children ====
- L’albero azzurro (The blue tree) – show of educative entertainment for the littlest ones, with the puppet-bird Dodò as protagonist, realized with the contribution of renowned authors and educationalists (Bianca Pitzorno, Bruno Munari, Nico Orengo); again on air.

=== Finivest ===
==== Drama ====
- Vincere per vincere (Winning to win) – cycle of 6 sports dramas with a social background, each dedicated to a different discipline, directed by Stefania Casini.
- Sanato, domenica, lunedì (Saturday, Sunday, Monday) – by Lina Wertmuller, from the Eduardo De Filippo's play, with Sophia Loren, Luca De Filippo and Luciano De Cresecenzo; in three days, a middle class couple goes from apparent happiness to breakup and then to reconciliation.
- Oggi ho vinto anch’io (Today I won too) with Franco Nero and Barbara De Rossi and Voglia di vivere with Thomas Millian and Dominique Sanda - both directed by Lodovico Gasparini and inspired by the true stories of Saverio Pallucca, who ran the New York City Marathon after a heart transplant, and of Lorenzo Odone.
- Vita coi figli (Life with the sons) – by Dino Risi, with Giancarlo Giannini and Monica Bellucci (debuting as actress). After the death of his wife, a businessman finds a new relationship with his five sons and a new love.

==== Miniseries ====
- Dagli Appennini alle Ande – by Pino Passalacqua, with the child Umberto Caglini and Giuliano Gemma; 3 episodes. From the Edmondo De Amicis’ story, transferred from nineteenth-century Argentina to the contemporary one of the dictatorship and the desaparecidos.
- Vendetta, secrets of a mafia bride by Stuart Margolin, from the Sveva Casati Modigliani’s novel, with Carol Alt.
- Prigioniera di una vendetta (Maximum exposure) – international coproduction by Jeannot Szwarc and Vittorio Sindoni, with Mirelle Darc and Charles Aznavour; 4 episodes. A widow travels the world investigating her husband's death.

==== Serials ====
- Cri Cri – sequel of Arriva Cristina, with Cristina D’Avena; 2 seasons.
- College – directed by Federico Moccia, with Federica Moro and Keith Van Hoven. Amorous dalliances between the cadets of a military academy and the students of a girls' boarding school.
- Giorni d’estate (Summer days) – sitcom about a band of young musicians, with Paola Barale.
- I-taliani – sitcom with Trettré; 2 seasons.

==== Variety ====
- Buon compleanno Canale 5 (Happy birthday, Canale 5) – celebrative show for the network’s tenth anniversary.
- Caccia all’uomo (Man hunt) – quiz with Jocelyn Hattab; the contestant must track down an unknown man in a foreign city.
- Quel motivetto... (That tune...) – muisc game show, inspiret to Il musichiere, hosted by Raimondo Vianello.
- Tris - quiz about music, hosted by Mike Bongiorno.
- Emilio ’90 – special edition of the cabaret show Emilio for the 1990 FIFA World Cup.
- Gente comune (Ordinary people) – talk show, hosted by Silvana Giacobini.
- Star 90 – talent show, hosted by Alessandro Cecchi Paone; it reveals Aldo Baglio and Giovanni Storti.

==== News and educational ====
- Pronto polizia (Hello police) – a hand-held camera follows the police’s daily work.
- Linea continua (Permanent line) – hosted by Rita Dalla Chiesa. The show takes up the formula of RAI Chi l'ha visto (the search for missing or kidnapped people) but is closed beforehand because low ratings.
- Born in the USA, le città della musica americana (Towns of American music) – by Enzo Gentile and Ezio Guardamacchi, and Miti mode e rock and roll (Myths, fads and rock and roll) by Emilio Carelli, musical documentaries.

=== Other channels ===
- Banane – satirical variety hosted by Gioele Dix, with Fabio Fazio, Giobbe Covatta and Paolo Hendel (TMC)
- A domanda risponde – unusual program of “no scruples interviews”, hosted by Mario Marcellini, where the interviewed are asked to answer by lying (Rete Mia)

== Ending this year ==
- Accendi un’amica
- Alla ricerca dell’arca
- Babilonia
- Biberon
- Bis
- C’era una volta il festival
- Caccia al 13
- Caffelatte
- Clip clip
- Dee Jay beach
- Dee Jay television
- Dibattito!
- Doppio slalom
- Emilio
- Europa Europa
- Fluff, processo alla TV
- Forza Italia
- La grande boxe
- Mezzogiorno è
- Una rotonda sul mare
- WIP – World important persons
- Zio Tibia picture show

== Deaths ==
- 3 February: Felice Chiusano, 67, singer, member of Quartetto Cetra.
- 2 April: Aldo Fabirzi, 84, actor.
- 27 October: Ugo Tognazzi, 68, actor.
- 15 November; Paolo Valenti, 68, sport journalist, host of Novantesimo minuto, popular for his humor and impartiality.
- 18 December: Orazio Orlando, 57, actor

== See also ==
- List of Italian films of 1990
