= Guia Jelo =

Italian actress (born 1952)

- Born: Guglielmina Francesca Maria Jelo di Lentini; 5 May 1952 (age 74); Catania, Italy
- Occupation: Actress
- Years active: 1978-present

Guia Jelo (born Guglielmina Francesca Maria Jelo di Lentini; 5 May 1952) is an Italian actress. She appeared in more than forty films since 1978.

== Selected filmography ==
- Corleone (1978)
- The Bride Was Beautiful (1986)
- Boys on the Outside (1990)
- The Escort (1993)
- The Whores (1994)
- Strangled Lives (1996)
- E adesso sesso (2001) as Anna
- Raul: Straight to Kill (2005) as Caterina
- My Name Is Thomas (2018) as Zia Rosario
- Eternal Visionary (2024)
