= The Rebel (1993 film) =

- Directed by: Aurelio Grimaldi
- Written by: Aurelio Grimaldi
- Starring: Penélope Cruz; Marco Leonardi; Stefano Dionisi
- Cinematography: Maurizio Calvesi
- Music by: Carlo Crivelli
- Distributed by: Reteitalia
- Release date: 1993
- Running time: 1:20
- Country: Italy
- Language: Italian

The Rebel is a 1993 Italian drama film. Originally released as based on the novel Storia di Enza, which was written and adapted by the film's director, Aurelio Grimaldi. The film stars the Spanish actress Penélope Cruz. It also features Stefano Dionisi, Lorenza Indovina and Marco Leonardi. The film was originally released in Italian entitled La Ribelle.

== Plot ==
Enza, 16, a dropout, is arrested with her older sister, Rosaria, for shoplifting. They are sent to a reformatory run by the hard-nosed nuns. The girls tease Enza because she is a virgin. On the first Sunday when she is allowed a pass, she goes to bed with Sebastiano, a young street vendor who chats her up. Enza thinks it is love, but when the authorities ask him if he wants her to live with him, he says no.

On her next visit home, Enza meets Franchino. He seems nicer and passes her test: he sleeps beside her but keeps his hands off. She thinks that must be love. However, through Rosaria, she sees another side of Franchino. Now pregnant, Enza has major long-term decisions to make.
