= My Name Is Thomas =

- Film poster
- Italian: Il mio nome è Thomas, La chiamavano Maryam
- Directed by: Terence Hill
- Written by: Terence Hill; Luisa Tonon
- Produced by: Jess Hill; Paolo Luvisotti; Anselmo Parrinello; Anna Vila
- Starring: Terence Hill; Veronica Bitto; Andy Luotto; Guia Jelo
- Cinematography: Roberta Allegrini
- Edited by: Luca Benedetti
- Music by: Pino Donaggio
- Production companies: Paloma 4; Paloma Productions; Vivi Film
- Distributed by: Romis Film
- Release date: 19 April 2018 (Italy)
- Running time: 96 min
- Country: Italy
- Language: Italian

My Name Is Thomas (Italian: Il mio nome è Thomas or La chiamavano Maryam) is a 2018 Italian drama film directed by Terence Hill and starring Hill alongside Matt Patresi, Eva Basteiro-Bertoli, Veronica Bitto and Guia Jelo. The film is the return of Terence Hill since he appeared in Doc West (2009).

It is produced by Luisa Tonon and Jess Hill, Terence's son, and distributed by Lux Vide, the same distributor of Don Matteo.

The film is dedicated to Bud Spencer when, on 27 June 2016, before the end of the shooting of the film, Spencer died. It was released on 19 April 2018. The title appears to be a reference to a book of the same name by Mary Fabyan Windeatt, who shares certain common traits with the young heroine of the film.

Film was presented on 8 December 2016 in the program Rischiatutto, conducted by Fabio Fazio, where Terence Hill showed the trailer. In March 2018 was announced the final release of the film on 19 April.

It was shot in Almería in locations as parque de las Almadrabillas, port of Almeria, Cable Inglés, Tabernas and Pescadería. It includes many references to the "Fazzuli Western", including a pub brawl where the only thing missing from 1970 is Bud Spencer.

== Plot ==
Thomas starts from Italy to reach the desert in the Almeria area where he can meditate on the pages of a book he loves in a special way. Shortly after the departure on his Harley Davidson, he helps a girl, Lucia, to escape from two undesirable types from whom she stole money.

Thomas values his solitude, but Lucia is quite persistent, and he is intrigued by her, and so the two end up traveling together.

As they travel, their journey is interrupted by a series of mishaps, most of which are caused by Lucia. It becomes clear to Thomas that she is troubled, and he is torn whether he should try to help her, or continue on his way, alone, as he originally intended.

But Lucia is not the only one who is troubled. Thomas is also looking for something that is missing in his life—some spark, or meaning that will provide him with a direction. While he doesn't understand how, he has a vague sense that Lucia's presence could help him find his way.

Finally, Thomas drops Lucia off to rendezvous with her aunt (who, given Lucia's penchant for storytelling, may or may not exist), and Thomas completes the journey to his desert retreat. As he begins his quest for self-discovery, he appears to be finding the experience less satisfying than he hoped, until he awakens in the morning to find that Lucia has joined him, and is sleeping in the shed next to his residence.

The two continue together at the desert retreat, again with some interruptions resulting from Lucia's inner turmoil. They read his special book, itself a story of self-discovery, telling the tale of the birth of Christ, and the experiences of Mary, but from a personal more than a religious standpoint. For Lucia, overcoming her inner demons is difficult and highly emotional, while Thomas is also learning, perhaps more from trying to help Lucia than from rereading his book.

As the days pass, the two develop a close bond, caring for each other a great deal (though, seemingly, not in a romantic sense). Thomas rediscovers the spark he had lost, and Lucia finds the inner peace she needed.

Sadly, in the end, the two are separated by circumstance, however, in the last scene, we see that their journey together may not be over.

== Cast ==
- Eva Basteiro-Bertoli as Dottoressa
- Francesca Beggio as Maria
- Veronica Bitto as Lucia
- Terence Hill as Thomas
- Guia Jelo as Zia Rosario
- Andy Luotto as Priore
- Giovanni Malafronte as Cameriere
- Matt Patresi as Max
- Cinzia Susino as Dottoressa nave

== See also ==
- My Name Is Nobody
