= Three Days of Anarchy =

- Directed by: Vito Zagarrio
- Written by: Vito Zagarrio
- Starring: Enrico Lo Verso; Tiziana Lodato
- Cinematography: Pasquale Mari
- Edited by: Roberto Missiroli
- Music by: Pivio and Aldo De Scalzi
- Release date: 2005
- Language: Italian

Three Days of Anarchy (Italian: Tre giorni d'anarchia) is a 2005 Italian drama film written and directed by Vito Zagarrio.

== Plot ==
The three days power vacuum in a Sicilian village shortly after the American landing in Sicily in July 1943.

== Cast ==
- Enrico Lo Verso as Giuseppe
- Tiziana Lodato as Pina
- Marica Coco as Anna
- Salvatore Lazzaro as Toni
- Gaetano Aronica as Salvatore
- Luigi Maria Burruano as Don Mimì
- Renato Carpentieri as Don Vito Gallo
- Rosa Pianeta as Donna Rosa
- Nino Frassica as Dr. Puglisi
- Giacinto Ferro as Don Calò
- David Coco as Pasquale
- Roberto Purvis as Joe
- Robert Hundar
