= Vito Zagarrio =

Italian film director

- Born: 2 May 1952 (age 72); Florence, Italy
- Occupation(s): Film director, film critic, film historian, professor

Vito Zagarrio (born 2 May 1952) is an Italian film director, film critic and film historian.

He is a professor at the University of Florence and at Roma Tre University.

== Filmography ==
- Young Distance (1988)
- Bonus malus (1993)
- Three Days of Anarchy (2005)
- Le seduzioni (2021)
