= Enrico Oldoini =

Italian director and screenwriter (1946–2023)

- Born: 4 May 1946; La Spezia, Italy
- Died: 10 May 2023 (aged 77)
- Occupations: Film director, screenwriter
- Height: 1.72 m (5 ft 8 in)

Enrico Oldoini (4 May 1946 – 10 May 2023) was an Italian director and screenwriter.

Born in La Spezia, in 1966 Enrico Oldoini started attending the Silvio D'Amico National Academy of Dramatic Art in Rome, without graduating. From 1972, he then worked as an assistant director and occasional actor; two years later he debuted as a screenwriter working for the TV series Vivere insieme. A specialized screenwriter of comedy films, in 1984 he debuted as film director, and most of his films were box office successes in Italy; in the 1990s he focused his activities on television.

Oldoini died on 10 May 2023, at the age of 77.

== Filmography ==
- Cuori nella tormenta (1984)
- Lui è peggio di me (1984)
- Yuppies 2 (1986)
- Bellifreschi (1987)
- Bye Bye Baby (1988)
- Una botta di vita (1988)
- Vacanze di Natale '90 (1990)
- Vacanze di Natale '91 (1991)
- Anni 90 (1992)
- Anni 90: Parte II (1993)
- Miracolo italiano (1994)
- Un bugiardo in paradiso (1998)
- 13 at a Table (2004)
- La fidanzata di papà (2008)
- I mostri oggi (2009)
