= Soldati – 365 all'alba =

- Directed by: Marco Risi
- Written by: Stefano Sudriè; Marco Risi; Marco Modugno; Furio Scarpelli
- Cinematography: Giuseppe Berardini
- Music by: Manuel De Sica
- Release date: 1987
- Language: Italian

Soldati – 365 all'alba (i.e. "Soldiers 365 Days Before Discharge") is a 1987 Italian drama film directed by Marco Risi. The film, which deals with the military service seen as a traumatic experience, marked the switch of Risi from low-wattage comedies to more complex themes.

Before coming into production, the screenplay was submitted to the Ministry of Defence to obtain the necessary permits to shoot in real barracks, but it received an outright refusal, as the Ministry feared to exacerbate the already harsh controversy that at the time had invested the Army because of a chain of suicides in the barracks as a result of hazing. The film, therefore, was filmed partly in Rome between the Empire Studios, the private school Nazarene College and the psychiatric hospital Santa Maria della Pietà, and Trieste, in the museum of national history.

== Plot ==
The year is 1987. In a barracks in Pontebba, various young people who differ from each other in character, ways of life and social background are gathered for military service. To target the recruits are first the older soldiers (the nonni), then lieutenant Fili, who shows particular dislike for private Scanna. The officer vents on the soldier his existential dissatisfaction, the disappointment for a lack of promotion, the morbid jealousy for his wife Anna. But despite the harassment, the dismissal is approaching. On the very last night, the young soldiers, fully armed, are called for a strange exercise and leave by plane to an unknown destination.

== Cast ==
- Claudio Amendola as Claudio Scanna
- Massimo Dapporto as Lieutenant Armando Fili
- Ivo Garrani as Colonel
- Claudio Botosso as Adalberto Romani
- Alessandro Benvenuti as Buzzi
- Agostina Belli as Anna Fili
- Manlio Dovì as Salvatore Sciaffa
- Pietro Ghislandi as Dario Del Grillo
- Antonella Ponziani as Annina
- Sandro Ghiani as Corporal Porcu
- Ugo Conti as Sergeant Gallo
