= A Boy and a Girl (1983 film) =

- Directed by: Marco Risi
- Written by: Marco Ris Furio Scarpelli; Carlo Vanzina
- Cinematography: Giuseppe Maccari
- Music by: Manuel De Sica
- Release date: 1983
- Running time: 96 minute
- Country: Italy
- Language: Italian

A Boy and a Girl (Italian: Un ragazzo e una ragazza) is a 1983 Italian romantic comedy film directed by Marco Risi.

== Premise ==
Anna, a spirited Neapolitan, and Calogero, a thoughtful Milanese psychology student, meet by chance at a bar in Milan, and it's love at first sight.

== Cast ==
- Jerry Calà as Calogero Bertoletti
- Marina Suma as Anna De Rosa
- Sandro Ghiani as Mario
- Monica Scattini as Carmen
- Francesca Ventura as Matilde
- Serena Grandi as Prostitute

== See also ==
- List of Italian films of 1983
