= Francesco Benigno =

Italian actor

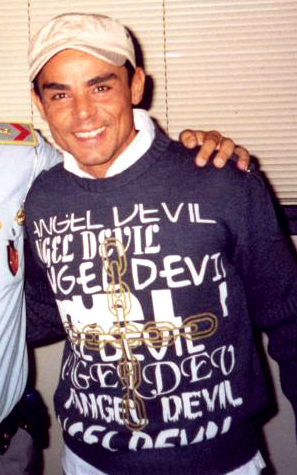
- Francesco Benigno in 2005
- Born: 4 October 1967 (age 59); Palermo, Sicily, Italy
- Occupations: Actor and singer

Francesco Benigno (born 4 October 1967), is an Italian actor, director, singer and television personality.

== Early life ==
Benigno was born in Palermo, Sicily, the twelfth of thirteen children. He grew up in Via Cataldo Parisio located in the densely populated Noce quarter. He lost his mother at the age of nine and has described his childhood as having been difficult. Subjected to beatings from his father, he ran away from home at 14 and lived on the streets, sleeping in metro stations and empty trains. He also fell into bad company.

== Career ==
He made his first acting debut in 1989, in Forever Mary, directed by Marco Risi who had discovered him at the age of 21. He played the same role of Natale Sperandeo in the film's sequel, Boys on the Outside, for which he won two awards as Best Actor, the Ciak d'Oro at the Venice Film Festival, and the Premio Piper. Both films were set in his native Palermo.

Benigno has since performed regularly in cinema, television, and has appeared on stage in two theatrical performances. Benigno appeared on the reality show La Fattoria in 2005, and has made many television guest appearances. In 2009, he participated as guest at the Sanremo Music Festival, singing "L'Italia" in a duet with Marco Masini. In 2008, he won the Grifone d'argento (Silver Griffin Award) at the Giffoni Film Festival for best director of a short film, the autobiographical Benigno.

In 2020, he directed the feature film Il colore del dolore, which was awarded with the critics' prize at the Terra di Siena Film Festival.

== Personal life ==
Benigno has two sons, Giuseppe and Manuel from two relationships as well as two grandchildren. Upon becoming an actor, he transferred to Rome but has since returned to Palermo. He considers himself Roman Catholic.

== Filmography ==
- Forever Mary (1989)
- Boys on the Outside (1990)
- Caldo soffocante (1991)
- Il commissario Corso (1991, television)
- Vacanze di Natale '91 (1991)
- Anni 90 (1992)
- Ultimo respiro (1992)
- Un sogno perso (1992)
- Anni 90: Parte II 1993)
- Miracolo italiano (1994)
- Palermo - Milan One Way (1995)
- La piovra, season 7 (1995, television mini-series)
- La stanza della scirocco (1998)
- Crimine contro crimine (1998)
- Ultimo (1998, television)
- Ultimo 2 - La sfida (1999, television)
- La Squadra (1999, television)
- Morso della serpente (1999, television)
- Il diavolo e l'acqua santa (1999, television)
- Excellent Cadavers (1999, television)
- Arresti domiciliari (2000)
- Donne di Mafia, (2001, television)
- Blindati, (2003, television)
- Ultimo 3 - L'infiltrato (2004, television)
- Tutte le donne della mia vita (2007)
- L'ultimo padrino (2008, television)
- It's the Law (2017)

== Theatre ==
- La Valigia di Carne, (1992–1993)
- Sotterraneo, (1994)

== Short films ==
- La Mancia, (1996–1997)
- Ice (Yamaha), (2001–2002)
- Benigno, (2008), which he also directed

== Discography ==
- Io ragazzo fuori (1991)
- Io=voi (1993)
- Per sempre (1997)
- Con il cuore in mano (2002)
- Nel cammino della vita (2005)
- Abbronzata (2007)

== Awards ==
(A partial listing)

- Efebo d'oro, for Mery Per Sempre, (1989)
- Ciak d'Oro, Best Actor, Ragazzi Fuori, (1990), Venice Film Festival
- Premio Piper, Best Actor, Ragazzi Fuori, (1990)
- Chiave d'oro Chianciano Terme, for Anni 90
- Premio Pasquino d'oro, (2001)
- Torre d'argento, Best Actor in television fiction, (2002–2003)
- Premio Aragonese, (2005–2006)
- Grifoni d'argento, Best Director of a short film, Benigno, (2008), Giffoni Film Festival
