= Boys on the Outside =

- Directed by: Marco Risi
- Written by: Aurelio Grimaldi
- Produced by: Claudio Bonivento
- Starring: Francesco Benigno; Alessandra Di Sanzo; Salvatore Termini; Alfredo Li Bassi; Maurizio Prollo; Vincenza Attardo; Roberto Mariano
- Cinematography: Mauro Marchetti
- Edited by: Franco Fraticelli
- Music by: Giancarlo Bigazzi
- Distributed by: Cecchi Gori
- Release date: 14 September 1990
- Running time: 110 minutes
- Country: Italy
- Language: Italian

Boys on the Outside (Italian: Ragazzi fuori, idiomatically Hustlers Outside) is a 1990 Italian drama film directed by Marco Risi in the neo-neorealistic style and written by Aurelio Grimaldi. Released in 1990, it is the sequel to the 1989 film Forever Mary. It stars Francesco Benigno, Alessandra Di Sanzo and Salvatore Termini.

== Synopsis ==
Boys on the Outside is the sequel of the 1989 drama film Forever Mary, and features most of the same characters. The film is largely set in ZEN, a bleak, economically deprived quarter on the northern outskirts of Palermo, Sicily, at the end of the 1980s. Its protagonist is Natale Sperandeo (played by Palermo-born actor Francesco Benigno), a young man who has just been released from Malaspina, a juvenile detention centre. Unable to find legitimate work, he takes up with his former gang, consisting of unemployed youths like himself, and perpetrates an armed robbery.

The film also traces the divergent paths taken by his former inmates at Rosaspina (actual name Malaspina), such as Marilyn "Mery" Libassi, who resumes her previous career as a trans prostitute while awaiting trial for her self defense assault on a client; Claudio Catalano, while seeking to avoid the vindictive Carmelo Vella (who blames Claudio for the loss of his left eye), obtains work as a mechanic in another neighbourhood, but shortly afterwards discovers his girlfriend, Vita is pregnant; Antonino Patané is forced to push drugs in order to maintain his two small children after the financial police sequester his potatoes which Antonino was selling without a license; and Giovanni Trapani, nicknamed King Kong and a member of Natale's gang, is fatally shot by a plainclothes police officer outside the open-air market of Vucciria after a long chase through the streets of Palermo for having robbed a car radio.

Boys on the Outside accurately depicts the social problems faced by Natale and his companions, such as crime, poverty, unemployment, prostitution, teenage pregnancy, and police harassment, which were indelible features of life in the poorer districts of Palermo and other Sicilian cities during that time period. It is a drama with realistic scenes of sex, violence, police brutality, and rape. It ends with the discovery of the body of a young man, burnt beyond recognition, on a refuse tip. It is presumed to be that of Claudio, although the film never reveals its identity. The Italian language is spoken throughout the film mixed with the Palermo dialect of the Sicilian language.

== Cast ==
- Francesco Benigno - Natale Sperandeo
- Alessandra Di Sanzo - Mario Libassi (Mery)
- Roberto Mariano - Antonio Patanè
- Maurizio Prollo - Claudio Catalano
- Alfredo Li Bassi - Carmelo Vella
- Salvatore Termini - Giovanni Trapani (King Kong)
- Filippo Genzardi - Matteo Mondello
- Enza Attardo - Vita
- Carlo Berretta - Salvo
- Giuseppe Pirico - Marcello
- Giuseppe Lucania - Santino
- Alessandro Calamia - Tommaso
- Tano Cimarosa - Site manager
- Guia Jelo - Prostitute
- Tony Sperandeo - Warder Turris

== Awards ==
Francesco Benigno won two awards, the Ciak d'Oro at the Venice Film Festival, and Premio Piper, for Best Actor in his portrayal of Natale Sperandeo. In 1991, Marco Risi won the David di Donatello Award for Best Director, and Claudio Bonivento won for Best Producer. Franco Fraticelli was nominated for Best Editing.

== See also ==
- List of Italian films of 1990
