= Manuel De Sica =

Italian composer (1949–2014)

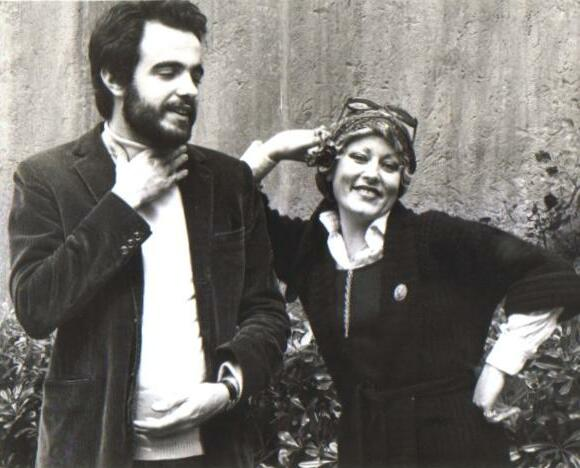
- De Sica with singer Nancy Cuomo (1974)
- Born: 24 February 1949; Rome, Italy
- Died: 5 December 2014 (aged 65); Rome, Italy
- Occupation: Composer
- Spouse: Tilde Corsi
- Children: 1
- Parent(s): Vittorio De Sica (father); María Mercader (mother)
- Relatives: Christian De Sica (brother)

Manuel De Sica (24 February 1949 – 5 December 2014) was an Italian composer.

Born in Rome, the son of Vittorio De Sica and María Mercader, De Sica enrolled at the Accademia Nazionale di Santa Cecilia, in which he studied with Bruno Maderna. He debuted as a composer for his father's film A Place for Lovers (1968). In 1969, he formed a band, The Ancients, with whom he appeared in the TV-show Studio Uno.

In 1993, De Sica won the Nastro d'Argento for Best Score for Carlo Verdone's Al lupo, al lupo. In 1996 he won the David di Donatello for Best Score for Carlo Lizzani's Celluloide.

De Sica also wrote chamber compositions and ballet music. He directed a television film, L'eroe (1975), and several documentaries, mostly focused on archaeology. In 2005 he was honored with the title of Commendatore of the Italian Republic.

De Sica died of a heart attack on 5 December 2014 at the age of 65.

== Selected filmography ==
- The Garden of the Finzi-Continis (1970)
- Gang War (1971)
- The Crimes of the Black Cat (1972)
- Gang War in Naples (1972)
- Lo chiameremo Andrea (1972)
- A Brief Vacation (1973)
- The Voyage (1974)
- Cagliostro (1975)
- Quel movimento che mi piace tanto (1976)
- Sexycop (1976)
- The Twist (1976)
- La portiera nuda (1976)
- Canne mozze (1977)
- Dear Father (1979)
- I'm Photogenic (1980)
- Sunday Lovers (1980)
- I'm Going to Live by Myself (1982)
- A Boy and a Girl (1983)
- Cuori nella tormenta (1984)
- Lui è peggio di me (1984)
- Vacanze in America (1984)
- Love at First Sight (1985)
- Soldati - 365 all'alba (1987)
- Il commissario Lo Gatto (1987)
- Taste of Life (1988)
- The Icicle Thief (1989)
- Count Max (1991)
- To Want to Fly (1991)
- Cemetery Man (1994)
- Vacanze di Natale '95 (1995)
- A spasso nel tempo (1996)
- Nuda proprietà vendesi (1997)
- Love Is Not Perfect (2012)
