= Aurelio Grimaldi =

Italian film director (born 1957)

- Born: 22 November 1957 (age 68); Modica, Italy
- Occupations: Film director, screenwriter
- Years active: 1989-2007

Aurelio Grimaldi (born 22 November 1957) is an Italian film director and screenwriter. His film The Whores was entered into the 1994 Cannes Film Festival.

== Selected filmography ==
- Ragazzi fuori (1990)
- The Rebel (1993)
- The Whores (1994)
- Nerolio (1996)
- The Man-Eater (1999)
