= Marco Risi =

Italian screenwriter, film producer and film director

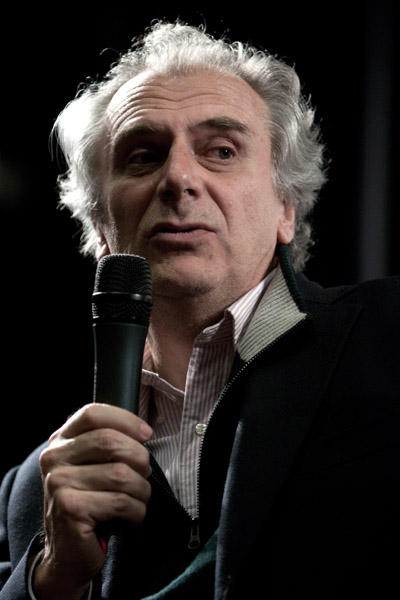
- Risi in 2009
- Born: 4 June 1951 (age 74); Milan, Italy
- Occupations: Film director; screenwriter; film producer
- Height: 1.83 m (6 ft 0 in)
- Relatives: Dino Risi (father); Nelo Risi (uncle)

Marco Risi (born 4 June 1951) is an Italian film director, screenwriter, film producer and cinematographer.

Born in Milan, he is son of director Dino Risi. After graduating from Liceo Scientifico, Risi joined the faculty of philosophy, but abandoned his studies after two years. He began his career as an assistant of his uncle, Nelo Risi, for A Season in Hell (1971) and thereafter for directors such as Duccio Tessari, Steno, Alberto Sordi. He also collaborated with some scripts for films directed by his father. He made his directorial debut in 1977, with the RAI television documentary Appunti su Hollywood. After three quite successful comedy films, since 1987 Risi's cinema focused into more complex social and political issues, such as the military service seen as a traumatic experience (Soldati - 365 all'alba), the juvenile delinquency in and out of prison (Forever Mary and Boys on the Outside), the crash of Itavia Flight 870 (The Invisible Wall), the gang rape phenomenon (Il branco) and the murder of journalist Giancarlo Siani (Fort Apache Napoli).

In 1989 Risi's Forever Mary won the Special Grand Prize of the Jury at the Montreal World Film Festival. For his 1990 film Boys on the Outside Risi won the David di Donatello Award for Best Director and a Silver Osella for Best Cinematography at the 47th Venice International Film Festival.

In 1991 Risi started, together with Maurizio Tedesco, a film production company, "Sorpasso Film". In 1998 he won the Nastro d'Argento for Best Producer for Ferzan Özpetek's Hamam.

== Filmography ==
- I'm Going to Live by Myself (1982)
- A Boy and a Girl (1984)
- Love at First Sight (1985)
- Soldati - 365 all'alba (1987)
- Forever Mary (1989)
- Boys on the Outside (1990)
- The Invisible Wall (1991)
- Nel continente nero (1993)
- Il branco (1994)
- Kaputt Mundi (1998)
- Tre mogli (2001)
- Maradona, the Hand of God (2007)
- Fort Apache Napoli (2009)
- Cha cha cha (2013)
- Three Touches (2014)
