= Federico De Robertis =

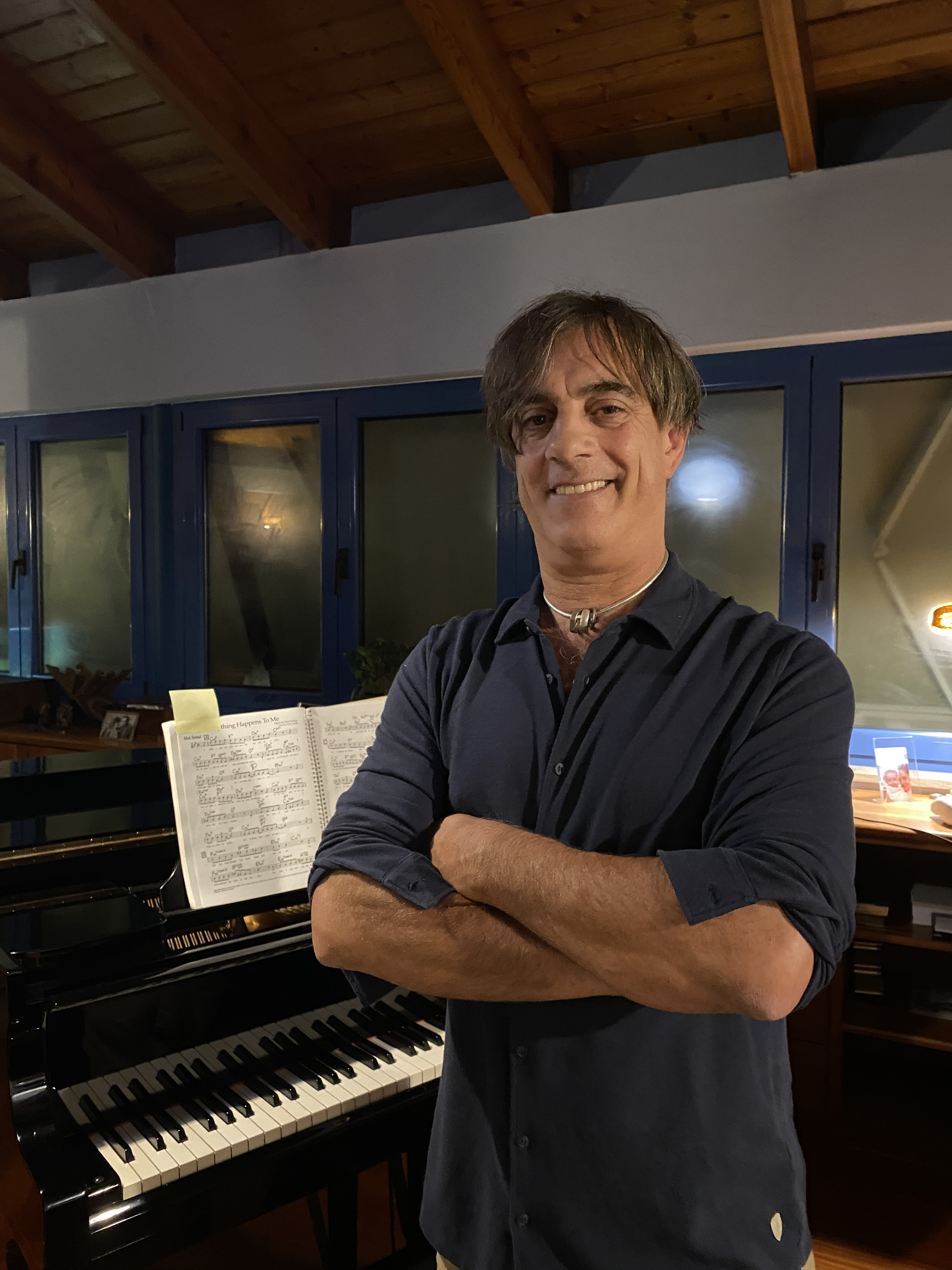
- Federico De Robertis

Background information
- Born: Federico De Robertis; 5 June 1962 (age 63); Lucca, Tuscany, Italy
- Occupations: Musician; composer; record producer
- Instrument: Piano
- Years active: 1988–present

Federico De Robertis (born 5 June 1962) is an Italian musician, composer and record producer. De Robertis was born in Lucca, Tuscany. He composed the soundtrack for many movies by the Italian director Gabriele Salvatores, Puerto Escondido (1992), Nirvana (1995) and Siberian Education (2013), also for the Vanzina's Brothers.

== Career ==
De Robertis started working on soundtracks in 1991 with the director Gabriele Salvatores, then with Carlo Vanzina, as well as others. In October 2011, he founded a music group, Fede & gli Infedeli, with which he performed several soundtracks and songs of his own composition.

In 2018, he authored a theme for the film Volare (film) directed by Gabriele Salvatores, and the same year he worked on the composition of the music for a multimedia art project on La rondine by Giacomo Puccini. The following year, as part of an event organized by Lucca Film Festival, the arrangements of the original music for Blade Runner composed by Vangelis. In 2020, he composed the original music for Italia Lockdown, a collective film edited by Salvatores.

== Selected discography ==
Solo and Collaboration

- Puerto Escondido (1992, soundtrack)
- S.P.Q.R.: 2,000 and a Half Years Ago (1994, soundtrack)
- I Don't Speak English (1995, soundtrack)
- Nirvana (1995, soundtrack)
- Selvaggi (1995, soundtrack)
- Banzai (1997, soundtrack)
- 2061: An Exceptional Year (2007, soundtrack)
- Siberian Education (2013)

== Awards and acknowledgments ==
=== David di Donatello ===
- 1994 – Best soundtrack nomination for Sud
- 1997 – Nomination for Best Score for Nirvana
- 2015 – Nomination for Best Score for The Invisible Boy

=== Silver Ribbons ===
- 1994 – Best soundtrack award for Sud

=== Golden Ciak ===
- 1994 – soundtrack for Sud

=== Golden Globe ===
- 1994 – soundtrack for Sud
