= Gli inaffidabili =

- Directed by: Jerry Calà
- Written by: Jerry Calà; Gino Capone
- Starring: Jerry Calà; Serena Grandi; Anna Kanakis; Andrea Roncato; Gigi Sabani; Ugo Conti; Armando De Razza; Mauro Di Francesco; Franco Oppini; Nini Salerno; Umberto Smaila; Leo Gullotta
- Cinematography: Sebastiano Celeste
- Edited by: Mauro Bonanni
- Music by: Umberto Smaila
- Release date: April 1997
- Running time: 105 minutes
- Country: Italy
- Language: Italian

Gli inaffidabili (lit. 'The unreliables') is a 1997 Italian comedy film directed by Jerry Calà. and written by Jerry Calà and Gino Capone. it stars Jerry Calà, Serena Grandi, Anna Kanakis.

== Cast ==
- Jerry Calà as Renato
- Serena Grandi as Fioranna
- Anna Kanakis as Gena
- Andrea Roncato as Michele
- Gigi Sabani as Nino Roversi
- Ugo Conti as Sergio
- Armando De Razza as Fulvio
- Mauro Di Francesco as Lillo
- Franco Oppini as Diego
- Nini Salerno as Marcello
- Umberto Smaila as Amedeo Manganelli
- Leo Gullotta as Alberto Mazza
- Alessia Merz as Manuela
- Giorgio Porcaro as Notary Persichetti
- Gegia as Annunziata Mazza
- Nadia Bengala as Nadia
- Stefano De Sando as Rino
- Fanny Cadeo as Marzia
- Antonio Covatta as Walter
- Gian Fabio Bosco as Giulio Mongelli
- Novello Novelli as Renato's father in law
- Ludovica Modugno as Renato's wife
- Gianni Mazza as Maracas
- Filippo Santon as Stefano
