= Fanny Cadeo =

Italian actress and singer

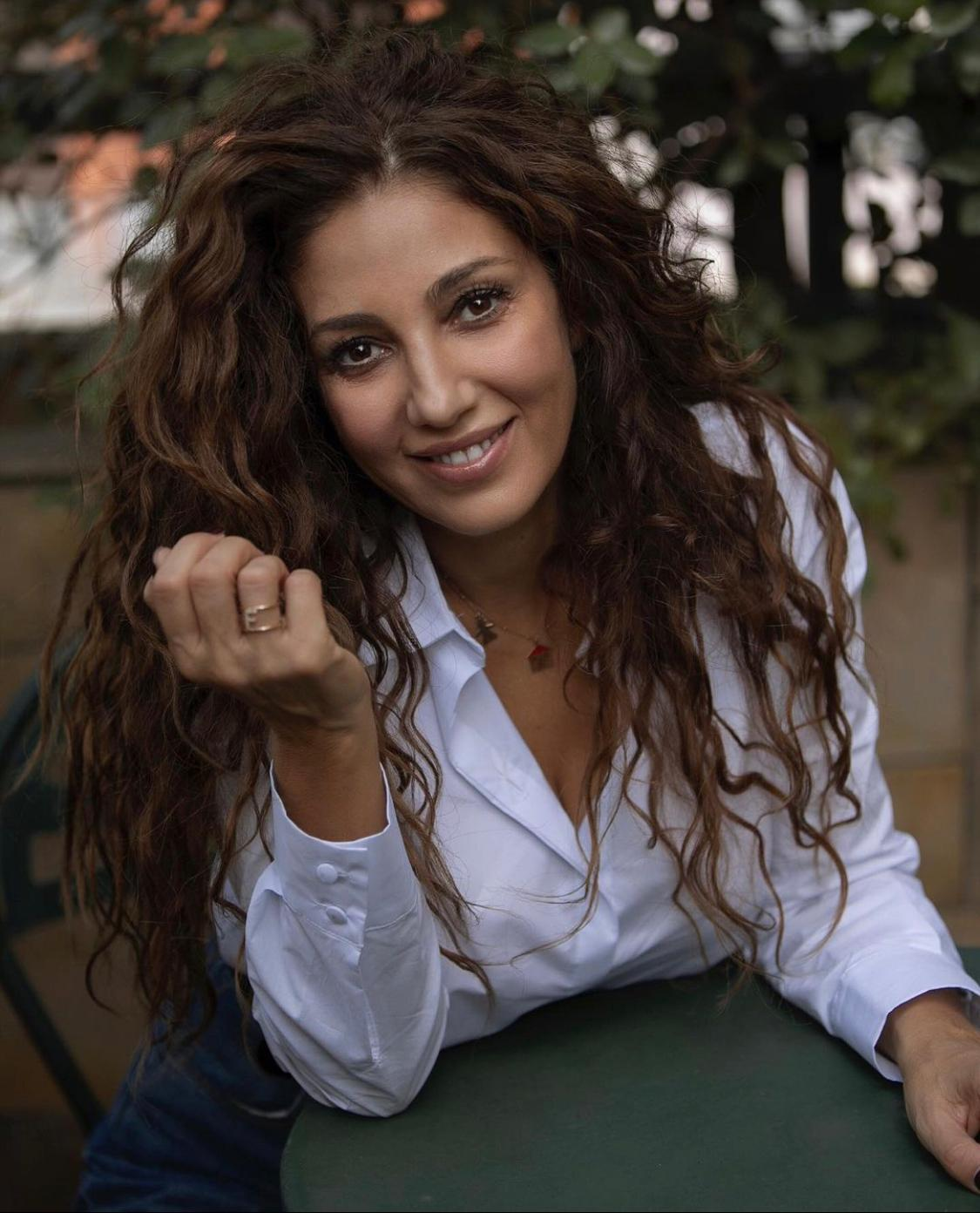
- Born: Stefania Cadeo; 11 September 1970 (age 55); Lavagna, Italy
- Occupations: Actress; singer; model
- Years active: 1992–present
- Height: 170 cm (5 ft 7 in)
- Spouse: Stefano Caviglia (m. 2011–2016)
- Children: 1
- Website: www.fannycadeo.it

Fanny Cadeo (born 11 September 1970) is an Italian actress, television personality, singer, and model. Cadeo was born in Lavagna and studied acting with Beatrice Bracco. She achieved her first success in 1992 when she was one of the first showgirls to appear in Striscia la notizia and remained with the show until 1994. Since 2013, she has been the presenter of the Rai Due television show Il Cercasapori.

Cadeo has a daughter born in 2014 from her relationship with an Italian businessman, Stefano Caviglia.

== Biography ==
Before entering show business, she graduated in languages at Liceo Lingiustico Santa Marta in Chiavari and participated in several singing lessons, dance and modern jazz. She made her television debut as a velina presenting Striscia la notizia (1992 and 1994).

She has also performed several songs, such as a cover of "Mambo italiano" (1993), "I want your love" (1994) and "Living in the Night" (2000).

In 1995 she landed a leading role in the film Trinita & Bambino ... e adesso tocca a noi!. In 2003 she was in the cast of Buona Domenica.

In 2012 she played Portia in the stage production of Shakespeare's The Merchant of Venice directed by Andrea Buscemi. From 2012 to 2014 she worked for Rai Radio 1 on the program L'Italia che va with Daniel Della Seta.

== Works ==
=== Theatre ===
- Gocce di luna - directed by Armando Marra
- Passerelle with Platinette - directed by Mino Bellei
- Sex and City - directed by Fabio Crisafi
- Arrivederci e grazie (monologues) with Manuela Kustermann - directed by Giancarlo Nanni
- Portami tante rose.it with Valeria Valeri - directed by Marco Mattolini
- Rimanga tra noi with Antonio Giuliani - directed by Antonio Giuliani
- Mi ritorni in mente with Franco Oppini - directed by Renato Giordano
- Il mercante di Venezia by William Shakespeare in the role of Porzia, with A. Buscemi directed by di A. Buscemi

=== Discografia ===
- 1993 - Another Chance
- 1993 - Mambo Italiano
- 1994 - I Want Your Love
- 1994 - Pecame
- 1995 - I Want Your Love Remix
- 2000 - Living In The Night

=== Cinema ===
- Trinità & Bambino... e adesso tocca a noi, directed by E.B. Clucher (1995)
- Croce e delizia, directed by Luciano De Crescenzo (1995)
- Gli inaffidabili, directed by Jerry Calà (1997)
- Una milanese a Roma, directed by Diego Febbraro (2001)
- Fatti della banda della Magliana, directed by Daniele Costantini (2005)
- Cose da pazzi, directed by Vincenzo Salemme (2005)
- Troppo belli, directed by Ugo Fabrizio Giordani (2005)

=== TV - Fiction ===
- Racket - directed by Luigi Perelli
- Agenzia fantasma - directed by Vittorio De Sisti
- Tutti gli uomini sono uguali - directed by Alessandro Capone
- Un posto al sole (guest star, in some episodes) - RAI 3
- La Squadra (guest star) RAI 3
- Il Grande Torino - directed by Claudio Bonivento
- Domani - regia di Vincenzo Terracciano
- Condominio sit-com in Buona Domenica (with Claudio Lippi and Laura Freddi) - directed by Beppe Recchia
- Io e mamma with Stefania e Amanda Sandrelli - directed by Andrea Barzini

=== TV - Programmes ===
- Striscia la notizia - edizione 1994
- Maurizio Costanzo Show
- Tappeto Volante
- Quelli che il calcio.
- Raffaella (TVE)
- Gran fiesta Italiana (Telecinco)
- Eurot (Chanel 4)
- Thomas G. Show (Germania)
- Primatist Trophy presenter for Odeon TV
- Donne e viaggi Rete 4
- Ci vediamo su Raiuno with Paolo Limiti
- Uno Mattina Raiuno (special broadcast)
- Stupido Hotel Raidue
- Buona Domenica Canale 5
- SOS notte (presenter) Alice Home TV
- Follie rotolanti (presenter) Raidue (2008)
- Venice Music Award (Raidue) 2009
- Cercasapori (presenter) (Raidue) 2009-2010
- Premio Mogol (Aosta) Raiuno (2010)
- 10 Stelle per Madre Teresa Raiuno, 2010
- L'Anno che verrà Raiuno Concerto do Capodanno 2011 a Rimini (2 canzoni)
- Torino Film Festival Rai Movie presenter
- Lasciatemi cantare Raiuno with Carlo Conti
- Quello che le donne (non) dicono (guest) (2015) - Agon Channel

=== Radio programs ===
- Programma musicale anni ’60 – ’80. Author and presenter - Isoradio
- Il Cercasapori-SMS consumatori. Presenter - Isoradio
- Grazie dei fiori. Presenter - Isoradio
- L’Italia che va con Daniel della Seta. Presenter - Radio 1
