= Staffelli =

Staffelli is an Italian surname. Notable people with the surname include:

- Rebecca Staffelli (born 1998), Italian television presenter, radio personality and model
- Valerio Staffelli (born 1963), Italian journalist and television personality
