= Odissea nell'ospizio =

- Film poster
- Directed by: Jerry Calà
- Written by: Jerry Calà; Nini Salerno; Edoardo Bechis
- Starring: Jerry Calà; Franco Oppini; Nini Salerno; Umberto Smaila
- Cinematography: Alessandro Zonin
- Edited by: Angelo D'Agata
- Music by: Umberto Smaila
- Production companies: BIC Production; LDM Comunicazione
- Release date: 2 October 2019
- Running time: 95 minutes
- Country: Italy
- Language: Italian

Odissea nell'ospizio (transl. "Hospice Odyssey", a pun on Space Odyssey) is a 2019 Italian comedy film directed by Jerry Calà.

== Cast ==
- Jerry Calà as Jimmy Canà
- Franco Oppini as Franz Occhini
- Nini Salerno as Nino Palermi
- Umberto Smaila as Gilberto Smania
- Tetyana Veryovkina
- Mauro Di Francesco as Billy Campobasso
- Giorgia Sinicorni as Miriam
- Carmen Vitter
- Sofia Milos as Carla
- Katherine Kelly Lang as herself
- Camilla Ferranti as the TV journalist
- Andrea Roncato as Sergio Longhi
- Antonio Catania as Luca Martirio
- Ugo Fangareggi as Mago Egildo
- Enrico Salimbeni as the tax collector
- Massimo Milazzo as Omero
- Luciana Frazzetto as Jessica
- Maurizio Tabani as Mauro
- Francesca De André as Lara Canà
- Antonio Fazio as Gilberto’s student
- Esmeralda Spadea as Saveria
