= The Heroes (1994 film) =

- Italian: I mitici – Colpo gobbo a Milano
- Directed by: Carlo Vanzina
- Written by: Leo Benvenuti; Piero De Bernardi; Carlo Vanzina; Enrico Vanzina
- Produced by: Enrico Vanzina
- Starring: Claudio Amendola; Monica Bellucci; Ricky Memphis
- Cinematography: Luigi Kuveiller
- Edited by: Sergio Montanari
- Music by: Umberto Smaila
- Production companies: Video 80; Dean Film
- Distributed by: Warner Bros. Italia
- Release date: 18 February 1994
- Running time: 85 minutes
- Country: Italy
- Language: Italian

The Heroes (Italian: I mitici – Colpo gobbo a Milano, lit. 'The mythical guys: big heist in Milan') is a 1994 Italian heist comedy film directed by Carlo Vanzina.

== Cast ==
- Claudio Amendola as Fabio
- Monica Bellucci as Deborah
- Ricky Memphis as Enzo
- Tony Sperandeo as Tonino
- Pier Maria Cecchini as Giulio
- Ugo Conti as Igor
- Mirella Falco as Signora Motta
- Paolo Lombardi as the Commissioner
- Umberto Smaila as the jewellery owner
- Toni Ucci as Sor Peppe
- Pietro Ghislandi as Colnaghi
- Riccardo Calvani as Squillace
- Ugo Bologna as Calabrò
