= Domani mi sposo =

- Directed by: Francesco Massaro
- Written by: Francesco Massaro; Enrico Vanzina; Carlo Vanzina; Enrico Oldoini; Franco Ferrini; Jerry Calà
- Starring: Jerry Calà; Isabella Ferrari; Karina Huff; Milly Carlucci
- Cinematography: Giorgio Di Battista
- Music by: Detto Mariano
- Release date: 1984
- Language: Italian

Domani mi sposo (also known as Tomorrow I'm Getting Married) is a 1984 Italian romantic comedy film directed by Francesco Massaro.

== Plot ==
Last twenty-four hours before the marriage for the troubled, tempted, overwhelmed by events Arturo.

== Cast ==
- Jerry Calà: Arturo Righetti
- Isabella Ferrari: Susy
- Milly Carlucci: Simona
- Karina Huff: Rita
- Guido Nicheli: Gastone
- Claudio Bisio: Attilio aka Volver
