= 2061: An Exceptional Year =

2061 – An exceptional year
- Directed by: Carlo Vanzina
- Written by: Carlo Vanzina; Enrico Vanzina; Diego Abatantuono
- Starring: Diego Abatantuono
- Cinematography: Claudio Zamarion
- Edited by: Raimondo Crociani
- Music by: Federico De Robertis
- Production companies: International Video 80; Rai Cinema
- Distributed by: 01 Distribution (Italy)
- Release date: 2007
- Running time: 100 minutes
- Country: Italy
- Language: Italian

2061 – An exceptional year (Italian: 2061 – Un anno eccezionale) is a 2007 Italian comedy film directed by Carlo Vanzina.

== Plot ==
Italy, year 2061: After a terrible energy crisis due to the depletion of oil stocks, the Earth is plunged into a kind of new Middle Ages. Italy as a nation no longer exists, the peninsula has returned to being a divided country, almost pre-Risorgimento, where now reigns the political situation is similar to that before the reunification of 1861:

- In the North the Padanian secessionists have conquered Milan, creating the Lombard Republic, defended by a high wall erected on the Po River to block the entrance to the "southerners";
- In Emilia-Romagna has been proclaimed "People's Republic of Sickle and Mortadella", which is famous for meat, rubles and dance halls;
- Tuscany is back to being a Grand Duchy, where the houses Della Valle and Cecchi Gori are struggling for power;
- In the Center the Papal State is reborn, a fundamentalist regime dominated by the Inquisition;
- The South has been invaded instead by Africans, who have created the rich "Sultanate of the Two Sicilies", an Islamic state where Arabic is the official language.

Just from the South, a group of adventurous patriots of the insurrectional movement "Young Italy", made up of volunteers Tony, Pride, Grosso, Salvim and Taned, and led by Ademaro Maroncelli (teacher at the Classical Lyceum Massimo D'Alema of Turin) undertakes a difficult journey to the Piedmont, in order, two hundred years later, to reunify Italy.

== Cast ==
- Diego Abatantuono: Professor Ademaro Maroncelli
- Emilio Solfrizzi: Nicola Cippone
- Sabrina Impacciatore: Mara Pronesti
- Dino Abbrescia: Tony
- Stefano Chiodaroli: Grosso
- Jonathan Kashanian: Pride
- Paolo Macedonio: Salvim
- Antonello Costa: Taned
- Andrea Osvárt: Unna
- Michele Placido: Cardinal Bonifacio Colonna
- Anna Maria Barbera: Nunzia La Moratta
- Massimo Ceccherini: Cosimetto Delli Cecchi
- Nini Salerno: Marchese di Villa Sparina
- Ugo Conti: Shrek
- Enzo Salvi: Becchino
