= Guido Nicheli =

Italian actor

Guido Nicheli (24 July 1934 – 28 October 2007) was an Italian actor.

== Selected filmography ==
- Cattivi pensieri (1976)
- Il padrone e l'operaio (1976) - Guido
- Saxofone (1979) - Guido - friend of Fiorenza
- Una vacanza bestiale (1981)
- Eccezzziunale... veramente (1982) - snobbish man
- Il sommergibile più pazzo del mondo (1982) - American general
- Viuuulentemente mia (1982) - Rodolfo, a.k.a. Rudy
- Si ringrazia la regione Puglia per averci fornito i milanesi (1982) - Ambrogio, the bartender
- Sapore di mare (1983) - Adriana's husband
- Vacanze di Natale (1983) - Donatone
- Summer Games (1984) - Gino Carimati, a.k.a. Nogi
- Domani mi sposo (1984) - Gastone
- Scemo di guerra (1985) - Rossi
- Yuppies (1986) - company owner
- Professione of Wine (1986, TV Series) - Giangi
- Montecarlo Gran Casinò (1987) - Ambrose Colombo
- Tutti in palestra (1987, TV Mini-Series) - Adamo (1987)
- I ragazzi della 3ª C (1987–1989, TV Series) - Commander Zampetti
- Sauces l'amore (1988, TV Mini-Series)
- Le finte bionde (1989)
- Occhio alla Perestrojka (1990) - Dr. Gerardo Moschin
- Abbronzatissimi (1991) - man at pool party
- Anni 90 (1992) - club client ("elite club")
- Anche i commercialisti hanno un'anima (1994)
- Favola (1996, TV Movie) - the ambassador
- Gratta e vinci (1996) - Giorgetti
- Panarea (1997) - Bedoni
- S.P.Q.R. (1998, TV Series) - Giulio Seneca
- Cucciolo (1998)
- Vacanze sulla neve (1999) - Dado Carloni
- Pastrami 2000 - La clonazione (1999) - teacher at the Institute for Education in Power
- Spaghetti sulla neve (1999)
- Ma il portiere non c'è mai? (2002, TV Mini-Series) - Father Gianandrea
- Vita Smeralda (2006) - Captain
