= Baia Imperiale =

Nightclub near Rimini, Italy

- Interactive map of Baia Imperiale
- Former names: Baia degli Angeli
- Address: Via Panoramica 41; Gabicce Mare, Italy
- Coordinates: 43.964501°N 12.767204°E
- Type: Roman

Construction
- Opened: 1975

Website
- www.baiaimperiale.net

Baia Imperiale is a nightclub in Gabicce Mare, in the region of the Marche, Italy, popular among tourists to the cities of Rimini and Riccione.

Past disc jockeys at the club include Snoop Dogg, Steve Aoki, Martin Solveig, and Bob Sinclar. The club has hosted live performances by artists including Fedez, Guè Pequeno, Ensiferum, and J-ax.

== History ==
Entrepreneur Giancarlo Tirotti opened the nightclub on 29 June 1975 as the Baia degli Angeli (lit. 'Bay of Angels'). Tirotti, who was residing in the United States, wanted to import innovative nightclubbing to his holidays in Cattolica. The venue presented a distinctively new type of clubbing on the riviera romagnola, with extended opening hours, large spaces, two swimming pools, a restaurant, and a panoramic terrace.

The Baia degli Angeli closed in 1978. The club was renovated and reopened in 1985.

In 2018, for the fourth consecutive year, Baia Imperiale was ranked the top Italian nightclub in the International Nightlife Association's Top 100 Best Clubs in the World. The nightclub was ranked 19th worldwide. In 2019, the Baia Imperiale began hosting annual proms for students leaving secondary schools in the province of Rimini and San Marino. In August 2021, the nightclub was forcibly closed for a month by the order of the police commissioner following repeated public order disturbances by its patrons.

== Features ==
The nightclub is notable for its distinctive columns. It consists of four musical environments: La Sala del Senato, Lo Zodiaco, La Sala delle Piscine and La Terrazza.

== In popular culture ==
The nightclub has been used as a filming location for several Italian films, including Abbronzatissimi (1991) and S.P.Q.R.: 2,000 and a Half Years Ago (1994).

== See also ==
- Cocoricò (nightclub) – a nightclub in nearby Riccione
