= Karina Huff =

British actress (1961–2016)

- Born: 21 January 1961; London, England
- Died: 18 April 2016 (aged 55); London, England
- Occupation(s): Actress, showgirl, television personality
- Years active: 1980–1994
- Height: 1.63 m (5 ft 4 in)
- Children: 1 son

Carrina "Karina" Huff (21 January 1961 – 18 April 2016) was a British actress, showgirl and television personality, mainly active in Italy.

== Life and career ==
Born in London, Huff was first known in Italy as a showgirl in the Rai 2 variety show Signori si parte and as the television presenter of the Canale 5 musical program Popcorn. She later had roles of weight in a series of successful teen comedy films, notably Carlo Vanzina's Time for Loving, its immediate sequel Sapore di mare 2 and Vacanze di Natale. In 1989 she was in the main cast of the TV-series Zanzibar.

Following the failure of her marriage with an Italian land surveyor, Huff left showbusiness and returned with her son to London, where she became a teacher. In 2008, Huff was diagnosed with breast cancer, from which she was believed to be in remission. She later died from the same kind of breast cancer in April 2016.

== Filmography ==
- Time for Loving (1982)
- Vacanze di Natale (1983)
- Sapore di mare 2 – Un anno dopo (1983)
- Domani mi sposo (1984)
- Summer Games (1984)
- Urban Animals (1987)
- The Gamble (1988)
- Demons 6: De Profundis (1989)
- The House of Clocks (1989)
- Voices from Beyond (1990)
- Le nuove comiche (1994)

== Discography ==
Singles

- 1981 – Mexico/Maraja (with El Pasador, Fontana, 6025 283)
- 1982 – Tingimi di blu/Pelle a pelle (Polydor, 2060 262)
