= Lino Troisi =

Italian actor

- Born: 4 May 1932; Maddaloni, Province of Caserta, Italy
- Died: 4 May 1998 (aged 66); Rome, Italy
- Occupation: Actor

Lino Troisi (4 May 1932 - 4 May 1998) was an Italian stage, film, television and voice actor.

== Life and career ==
Born in Maddaloni, Troisi grew up in Rome, where he studied acting at the Accademia Nazionale di Arte Drammatica Silvio D'Amico. He was mainly active in theatre, in which he worked with Giorgio Strehler, Klaus Michael Grüber and Luca Ronconi, among others. He was also active in films and on television, and was also a voice actor and a dubber. He died of cancer, at the age of 66.

== Selected filmography ==
- Day by Day, Desperately, directed by Alfredo Giannetti (1961)
- Tony Arzenta, directed by Duccio Tessari (1973)
- The Murri Affair, directed by Mauro Bolognini (1974)
- Gambling City, directed by Sergio Martino (1975)
- I'm Starting from Three, directed by Massimo Troisi (1981)
- Honey, directed by Gianfranco Angelucci (1981)
- Sciopèn, directed by Luciano Odorisio (1982)
- Il ras del quartiere, directed by Carlo Vanzina (1983)
- One Hundred Days in Palermo, directed by Giuseppe Ferrara (1984)
- The Professor, directed by Giuseppe Tornatore (1986)
- Ternosecco, directed by Giancarlo Giannini (1986)
- The Mayor, directed by Ugo Fabrizio Giordani (1996)
