= Arrivano i gatti =

- Directed by: Carlo Vanzina
- Written by: Carlo Vanzina; Enrico Vanzina
- Starring: Jerry Calà; Franco Oppini; Nini Salerno; Umberto Smaila
- Music by: Umberto Smaila
- Release date: February 13, 1980
- Running time: 90 minutes
- Country: Italy
- Language: Italian

Arrivano i gatti (lit. 'Here come the cats') is a 1980 Italian comedy film directed by Carlo Vanzina starring the comedy group I Gatti di Vicolo Miracoli.

== Cast ==
- Jerry Calà as Jerry
- Franco Oppini as Franco
- Nini Salerno as Nini
- Umberto Smaila as Umberto
- Bruno Lauzi as the supermarket's director
- Orchidea De Santis as the adult film actress
- Diego Abatantuono as Felice
- Ennio Antonelli as Braciola
- Danila Trebbi as Danila
- Gianni Baghino as Rivetti
- Aldo Puglisi as Lieutenant La Pezza
- Ugo Bologna as Mario Bonivento
- Cesare Gelli as the adult film director
- Daniela Basile as Leonarda
- Franca Scagnetti as the New Telecineramek's employee
- Jimmy il Fenomeno as himself
- Hal Yamanouchi as Suzuki
- Pietro Zardini as Rimoldi
- Barbara Herrera as baroness Romanoff
- Cindy Leadbetter as Ingrid
