= Gabicce Mare Lighthouse =

Gabicce Mare
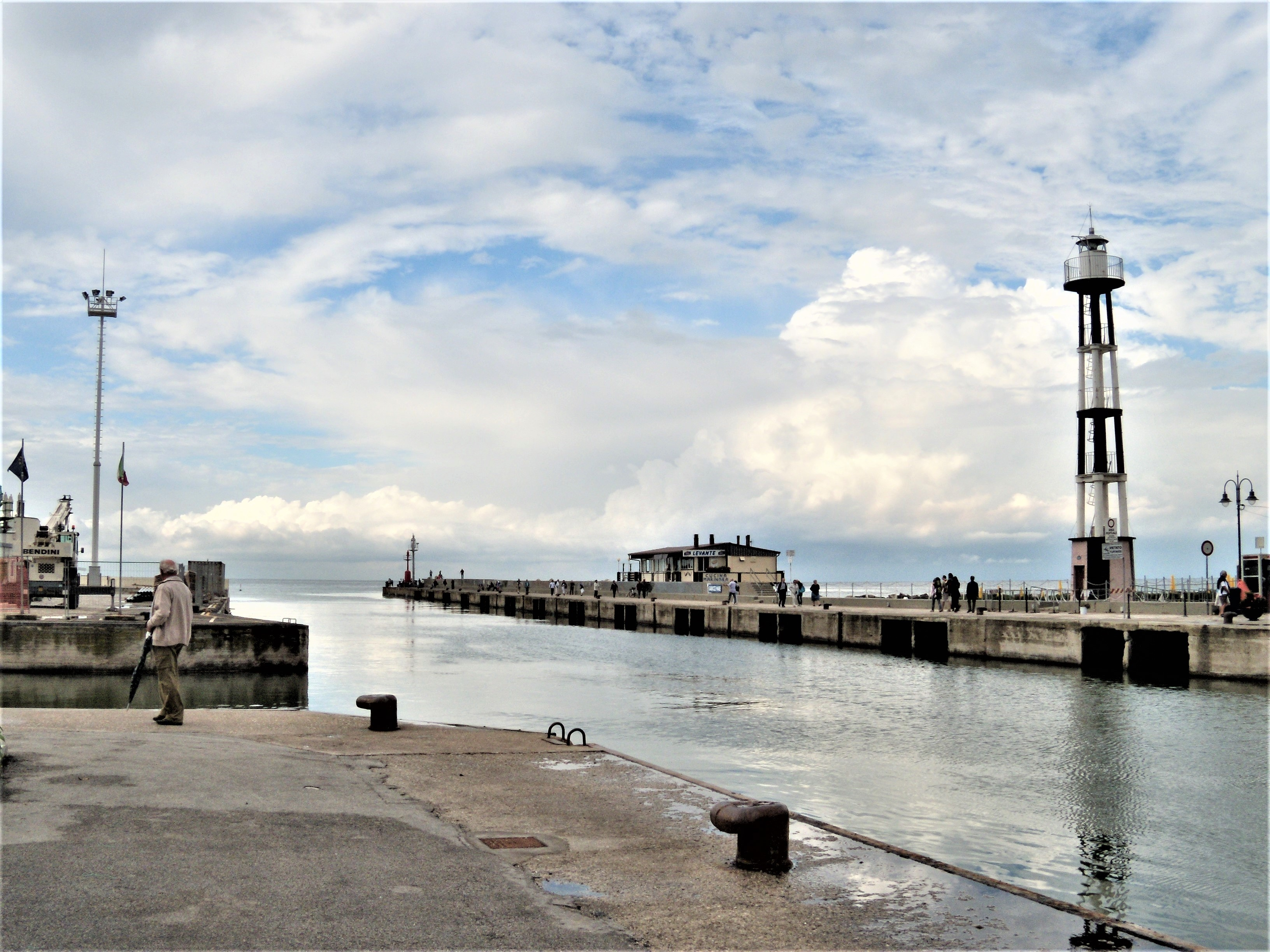
- Gabicce Molo di Levante Lighthouse
- Location: Gabicce Mare; Marche; Italy
- Coordinates: 43°58′08″N 12°45′04″E

Tower
- Constructed: 1882 (first)
- Foundation: concrete base
- Construction: concrete skeletal tower
- Automated: yes
- Height: 17 metres (56 ft)
- Shape: square pyramidal tower with gallery and lantern; 1-storey equipment building enclosed at the base
- Markings: white and black horizontal bands
- Power source: mains electricity
- Operator: Marina Militare

Light
- First lit: 1960 (current)
- Focal height: 17 metres (56 ft)
- Lens: Type TD 375 focal length: 187.5 mm
- Intensity: main: AL 1000 W reserve: LABI 100 W
- Range: main: 15 nautical miles (28 km; 17 mi) reserve: 11 nautical miles (20 km; 13 mi)
- Characteristic: Mo (O) W 14s.
- Italy no.: 3996 E.F.

Gabicce Mare Lighthouse (Italian: Faro di Gabicce Mare) is an active lighthouse located in Gabicce Mare, on the mole of the east side of Tavollo river that marks the border between Emilia-Romagna and the Marche on the Adriatic Sea.

== Description ==
The first lighthouse was built in 1882 and consisted of a wooden construction at the end of the pier. The current lighthouse, built in 1960, is composed of a concrete skeletal square pyramidal tower, 17 metres (56 ft) high, with balcony and lantern. A 1-storey equipment building is enclosed at the base of the tower which is painted in white and black horizontal bands. The lantern is painted in white, the dome in grey metallic, and is positioned at 17 metres (56 ft) above sea level and emits three long white flashes in a 14 seconds period, forming the letter O in the Morse code, visible up to a distance of 15 nautical miles (28 km; 17 mi). The lighthouse is completely automated and operated by the Marina Militare with the identification code number 3996 E.F.

== See also ==
- List of lighthouses in Italy
- Gabicce Mare
