= Delitti e profumi =

Crimes and Perfume
- Directed by: Vittorio De Sisti
- Written by: Francesco Massaro; Franco Ferrini; Oreste De Fornari; Carlo Alberto Bonadies
- Produced by: Claudio Bonivento
- Starring: Jerry Calà; Umberto Smaila; Eva Grimaldi
- Cinematography: Giuseppe Maccari
- Edited by: Claudio Di Mauro
- Music by: Umberto Smaila
- Distributed by: Variety Distribution
- Release date: 1988
- Running time: 90 minutes
- Country: Italy
- Language: Italian

Delitti e profumi (also known as Crimes and Perfume) is a 1988 Italian giallo film directed by Vittorio De Sisti, based on a story entitled Scarlet by Bonadies and De Fornari, both of whom also worked on the screenplay. Traci Lords appears in a cameo, a brief appearance in a softcore porn clip.

== Cast ==
- Jerry Calà as Eddy
- Umberto Smaila as Inspector Turroni
- Lucrezia Lante della Rovere as Barbara
- Eva Grimaldi as Porzia
- Mara Venier as Sister Melania
- Marina Viro as Maria Rita / "Mariri"
- Simonetta Gianfelici as Ambra
- Nina Soldano as Yoko
- Silvia Annichiarico as The Department Director
- Novello Novelli as The Ventriloquist
- Alba Parietti as Patty Pravo
- Traci Lords as Cameo Appearance

== Plot ==
Eddy, a detective who works as a security guard in a department store, is engaged to Barbara, a clerk in the same store. After receiving some perfume as a gift from a mysterious admirer, Barbara is burnt to death when she walks under some warm halogen spotlights. In order to discover what killed Barbara, Eddy decides to investigate together with Inspector Turroni. Afterwards, a prostitute named Portia is murdered in a similar way and Eddy discovers the cause of their deaths... the perfume sent to each victim by the killer contains a highly flammable substance (benzopyrene-15). Eddy decides to find if there was a connection between the two victims and he discovers that each victim had in her possession a piece of a picture. The picture was taken years before, in 1971, when the victims were just young girls. They had spent that summer together with a girl named Mariri, and one other mysterious girl, at a holiday camp managed by Sister Melania. The criminal is apparently getting revenge for a terrible accident that happened that summer at the camp.
