= Mariasole Pollio =

Italian actress, television presenter, radio personality and model (born 2003)

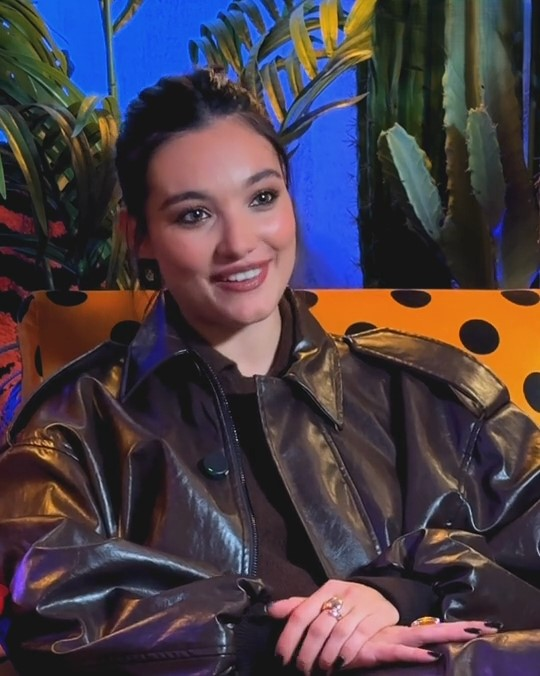
- Mariasole Pollio in November 2025
- Born: 18 July 2003 (age 23); Naples, Campania, Italy
- Occupations: Actress; television presenter; radio personality; model
- Height: 1.70 m (5 ft 6.93 in)
- Website: Mariasole Pollio

Mariasole Pollio (born 18 July 2003) is an Italian actress, television presenter, radio personality and model.

== Biography ==
Mariasole Pollio was born on 18 July 2003 in Naples, from mother Rossella and father Giuseppe Pollio, and also has a brother named Roberto. At the age of three, her mother enrolled her in a theatre course.

== Career ==
At the age of seven Pollio was enrolled in her city's film school to study acting. During her high school years she decides to open a YouTube channel. Later she enrolled in the linguistic baccalaureate, earning a diploma. In 2011, she starred in the series Violetta la traviata. In 2013 she starred in the short film Il mozzicone equilibrista directed by Luigi Scaglione. In 2016 she starred in the short film Giulia directed by Salvatore De Chiara.

Since 2018 to 2023, together with Alan Palmieri and Elisabetta Gregoraci, she has hosted the music program Battiti Live, broadcast on Radionorba and Italia 1.

In 2018 she auditioned to join the cast of the series Don Matteo in the role of Sofia Gagliardi. In the same year she was chosen by Leonardo Pieraccioni to act in his film Se son rose with the role of Yolanda, and she received the Charlot Revelation Fiction Award 2018. In the same year she participated in the Giffoni Film Festival. In the same year she took part in the music video for "Mi chiedevo se" by Francesco Sole. On 23 February 2019, she was a testimonial of the Kinder Ice Cream brand.

In 2020 she hosted the streaming event program MAS for From Milan With Love – Next Gen, along with DJ Khaled and Max Brigante. In the same year she participated in the television program Vieni con me, broadcast on Rai 1 with the conduction of Caterina Balivo. In the same year she took part in the music video Sembro matto by Max Pezzali.

In 2021 she played the role of Martina in the short film La regina di cuori directed by Thomas Turolo, and published her first book published by Mondadori, Oltre. In 2021 she directed the Battiti Summer Trend program, a spin-off of Battiti Live broadcast on the Mediaset Infinity platform.

In 2022, together with Elenoire Casalegno and Nicolò De Devitiis, she hosted the music program Battiti Live presenta: MSC Crociere – Il viaggio della musica, a spin-off of Battiti Live broadcast on Radionorba and Italia 1. In the same year, together with Rebecca Staffelli, she led the Coca Cola Summer Festival, broadcast by Radio 105. In 2022, she played the role of Mia in the short film La bambola di pezza directed by Nicola Conversa.

In 2022 she began her experience as a radio host for Radio 105, hosting the 105 Summer Compilation program. Since 11 September 2022 she has hosted 105 Loves Music, a radio program broadcast every Sunday on Radio 105. In 2023 she played the role of Greta in the television documentary Pooh – Un attimo ancora directed by Nicola Conversa.

In February 2025, Pollio co-hosted PrimaFestival, the introductory segment to each of the nights of the Sanremo Music Festival 2025.

== Personal life ==
Since 2022, Pollio has been romantically linked to Marco Salvaderi, drummer of the musical group Room9.

== Filmography ==
Film
| Year | Title | Role | Notes |
|---|---|---|---|
| 2016 | Giulia | Pure side | Short film |
| 2018 | Se son rose | Yolanda | Film |
| 2021 | La regina di cuori | Martina | Short film |
| 2022 | La bambola di pezza | Mia | Short film |
| 2023 | Pooh – Un attimo ancora | Greta | Television film |
| 2025 | Da cosa nasce cosa | Bianca | Film |
| 2025 | Come Romeo e Giulietta | Federica | Film |
| 2026 | Je so' pazzo | Dorina Giangrande | Film |

Television
| Year | Title | Role | Notes |
|---|---|---|---|
| 2018–2020 | Don Matteo | Sofia Gagliardi | Main role (seasons 11–12); 35 episodes |

== Television programs ==
| Year | Title | Role | Network |
|---|---|---|---|
| 2018–2023 | Battiti Live | Co-host | Italia 1 |
| 2022 | Battiti Live presenta: MSC Crociere – Il viaggio della musica | Co-host | Italia 1 |
| 2022–present | Summer Festival | Host | Radio 105 TV |
| 2023–2024 | Insieme nel 2024 | Host | Radionorba TV |
| 2024 | Premio Donne per Napoli | Host | Canale 8 |
| 2025 | PrimaFestival | Co-host | Rai 1 |
| 2025 | Ante Factor | Host | Sky Uno |
| 2026 | Eurovision Song Contest | Italian spokesperson | Rai 1 |

== Web TV ==
| Year | Títle | Platform | Role |
|---|---|---|---|
| 2020 | MAS for From Milan With Love - Next Gen | Radio Rossonera | Co-host |
| 2020 | MAS for From Milan With Love - Next Gen | ACMilan | Co-host |
| 2020 | MAS for From Milan With Love - Next Gen | TIDAL.com | Co-host |
| 2021 | Battiti Summer Trend | Mediaset Infinity | Host |
| 2025 | The Traitors Italia | Prime Video | Contestant |

== Radio ==
| Year | Títle | Channel | Role |
|---|---|---|---|
| 2022 | 105 Summer Compilation | Radio 105 | Host |
| 2022–present | 105 Loves Music | Radio 105 | Host |

== Works ==
- Pollio, Mariasole (2021). Oltre. Mondadori Electa. ISBN 9788851081478.

== Awards and nominations ==
| Year | Award | Category | Result | Notes |
|---|---|---|---|---|
| 2018 | Charlot Award | Charlot Revelation Fiction Award 2018 | Won | |
