= Solange (psychic) =

Italian actor (1952–2021)

- Born: Paolo Bucinelli; 25 April 1952; Collesalvetti, Tuscany, Italy
- Died: 7 January 2021 (aged 68); Collesalvetti, Tuscany, Italy
- Occupations: television personality, psychic and commentator
- Known for: La Slòira, Centro Studi Fra Dolcino

Paolo Bucinelli (25 April 1952 – 7 January 2021), known professionally as Solange, was an Italian television personality, psychic and commentator.

== Publications ==
- Voglio volervi bene, Milano, Greco & Greco, 1996. ISBN 88-7980-102-3.
- Rompi Solange e trovi Paolo, prefazione di Gigi Sabani, Pavia, Il Girasole d'oro, 1997. ISBN 88-7072-801-3.
- Io, Solange, vi insegno a leggere la mano e..., Pavia, Iuculano, 2004. ISBN 88-7072-670-3.
- Mani da VIP, allegato alla rivista Vero, 2006
- Orsacchiotto corallina mamma, Lainate, A.CAR., 2009. ISBN 978-88-6490-002-5.
- Esserci. [Poesie, pensieri, foto e l'oroscopo portafortuna per il 2014], Livorno, Debatte, 2013. ISBN 978-88-6297-165-2.
- I fiori dentro. Raccolta di emozioni, Villanova di Guidonia, Aletti, 2013. ISBN 978-88-591-1217-4.

== Filmography ==
- Ragazzi della notte, dir. Jerry Calà (1995)
- T'amo e t'amerò, dir. Ninì Grassia (1999)
- Solo un'ora d'amore (2006)
- Matrimonio alle Bahamas, dir. Claudio Risi (2007)
