= Really SSSupercool: Chapter Two =

- Directed by: Carlo Vanzina
- Written by: Carlo Vanzina; Enrico Vanzina; Diego Abatantuono
- Starring: Diego Abatantuono; Carlo Buccirosso; Ugo Conti; Mauro Di Francesco; Luigi Maria Burruano; Tony Sperandeo; Nino Frassica; Anna Maria Barbera; Sabrina Ferilli
- Cinematography: Claudio Zamarion
- Edited by: Raimondo Crociani
- Music by: Federico De Robertis
- Release date: 2006
- Language: Italian

Really SSSupercool: Chapter Two (Italian: Eccezzziunale veramente - Capitolo secondo... me) is a 2006 Italian anthology comedy film written and directed by Carlo Vanzina and starring Diego Abatantuono. It is the sequel of Eccezzziunale... veramente (1982).

== Cast ==
- Diego Abatantuono as Donato Cavallo / Franco Alfano / Felice La Pezza, aka "Tirzan"
- Sabrina Ferilli as Nunzia
- Carlo Buccirosso as Beniamino
- Anna Maria Barbera as Ginevra
- Ugo Conti as Ugo
- Mauro Di Francesco as Maurino
- Nino Frassica as Turi
- Luigi Maria Burruano as Don Calogero Calì
- Tony Sperandeo as Don Pippo Calì
- Angelo Donato Colombo as Donatello
- Stefano Chiodaroli as Sandrino
- Luis Molteni as Commendator Mambretti
- Silvia Annichiarico as The Nun
- Paolo Maldini as himself
- Gennaro Gattuso as himself
- Massimo Ambrosini as himself
- Dida as himself
- Alessandro Costacurta as himself
- Andriy Shevchenko as himself
- Luca Cordero di Montezemolo as himself

== See also ==
- List of Italian films of 2006
