= Alba Parietti =

Italian film actress and television presenter

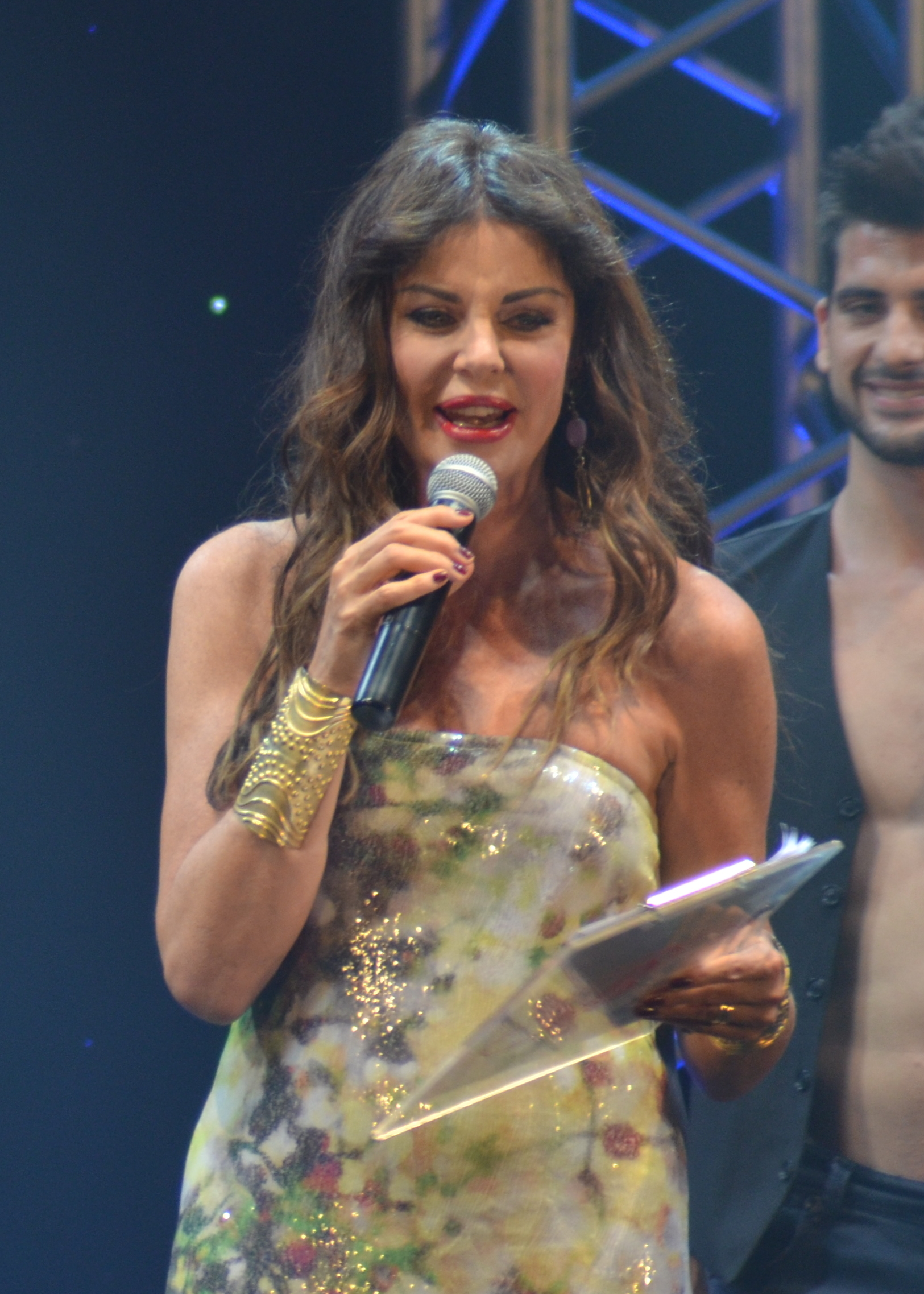
- Parietti in 2014
- Born: 2 July 1961 (age 65); Turin, Italy
- Occupations: Television presenter; actress; singer
- Years active: 1977–present (television); 1985–1998 (music)
- Spouse: Franco Oppini (divorced)
- Children: 1

Alba Parietti (born 2 July 1961) is an Italian television presenter, actress and former singer.

== Early life and career ==
Parietti was born on 2 July 1961 in Turin, Piedmont, Italy, the daughter of Francesco, a Piedmontese partisan originally from the Langhe then a chemist, whose nom de guerre was Naviga, and Grazia Dipietromaria, a painter and writer. She was named after Alba, where the partisans instigated the Republic of Alba in 1944. She began her performing arts career in 1977 with an appearance in the theatrical play, The Importance of Being Earnest, by Oscar Wilde. Although she did appear on television as early as 1975, her first role was in a major theatrical film in 1983 in Sapore di Mare (American version entitled Time for Loving). Parietti has since performed in many films, including the 1991 comedy film Abbronzatissimi, as Aurora. In February 1992, Parietti co-hosted the Sanremo Music Festival alongside Pippo Baudo in Sanremo, Italy.

During Parietti's brief foray into the music industry, she was primarily associated with the Italo disco style and released a series of singles during the 1980s as well as an eponymous album in 1996 and an EP in 1990. The single "Only Music Survives" was a moderate commercial success and was her only release to make the Top 40 national charts.

== Personal life ==
She gave birth to her only child, a son on 6 April 1982, with her ex-husband Franco Oppini.

== Discography ==
=== Studio albums ===
- Alba (1996)

=== Extended plays ===
- Alba da sentire (1990)

=== Singles ===
- "Only Music Survives" (1985) – Italy No. 35
- "Look Into My Eyes" (1985)
- "Jump and Do It" (1986)
- "Dangerous" (1987)

== Filmography ==
=== Films ===
Film roles showing year released, title, role played and notes
Year	Title	Role	Notes
1981	Miracoloni	Girl on boat	Cameo appearance
1982	Italian Boys	Secretary	Cameo appearance
1982	Time for Loving	Young woman	Cameo appearance
1988	Bye Bye Baby	Daria	
1988	Delitti e profumi	Patty Pravo	
1991	Abbronzatissimi	Aurora Lesata	
1992	Saint Tropez - Saint Tropez	Misericordia "Misery"	
1998	Il macellaio	Alina	
1998	Paparazzi	Alba	

=== Television ===
Television appearances showing year released, title, role played and notes
Year	Title	Role	Notes
1983	Galassia 2	Herself/co-host	Television debut; variety show
1983	Super Record	Herself/co-host	Sport program
1984	OK, il prezzo è giusto!	Herself/co-host	Game show
1984–86	W le Donne	Herself/co-host	Game show
1987	Giallo	Herself/co-host	Talk show
1990–92	Galagoal	Herself/host	Sport talk show (seasons 1–2)
1992	Sanremo Music Festival 1992	Herself/co-host	Annual music festival
1992–93	Domenica in	Herself/co-host	Talk show (season 17)
1992–94	Pavarotti & Friends	Herself/host	Concerts
1993	Corpo a corpo	Herself/host	Talk show
1993	Burbujas Antena 3 Tv España	Herself/Co-host/Vedette	Variety show
1993–96	Vota la voce	Herself/co-host	Musical show (seasons 21–24)
1994	Striscia la notizia	Herself/co-host	Variety show (season 6)
1994	Telegatto	Herself/co-host	Award ceremony
1994	Serata mondiale	Herself/host	Variety show
1995	Mina contro Battisti	Herself/host	Musical show
1995	Papaveri e papere	Herself/Guest host	Episode "March 4, 1995"
1995–97	Mezzanotte, angeli in piazza	Herself/co-host	Musical program
1996	Tutti in piazza	Herself/co-host	Variety show
1997	Mai dire Gol	Herself/Guest host	Episode: "February 3, 1997"
1997–98	Macao	Herself/host	Variety show
1999	Capriccio	Herself/host	Talk show
1999	Tre stelle	Paola Del Sol	Television film
2001	Festival di Napoli	Herself/co-host	Annual musical festival
2004	La fattoria	Herself/ Regular guest	Reality show (season 1)
2006	Notti sul ghiaccio	Herself/ Contestant	Season 1
2007	Notti sul ghiaccio	Herself/Judge	Season 2
2010	I Love My Dog	Herself/Judge	Animals talent show
2010	La pupa e il secchione	Herself/Judge	Reality show (season 2)
2011, 2019	L'isola dei Famosi	Herself/ Regular guest	Reality show (seasons 8 and 14)
2013–14	Quelli che... il Calcio	Herself/ Recurring guest	Variety show
2015	Announo	Herself/ Regular guest	Political program
2017	Ballando con le Stelle	Herself/ Contestant	Talent show (season 12)
2019	Live - Non è la D'Urso	Herself/ Regular guest	Talk show
2021	Tale e quale show	Herself/ Contestant	Variety show (season 11)
2022	Il cantante mascherato	Herself/ Contestant	Talent show (season 3)
2023	Non sono una signora	Herself/Host	Drag talent show
