= Vacanze in America =

- Theatrical release poster by Renato Casaro
- Directed by: Carlo Vanzina
- Written by: Enrico Vanzina; Carlo Vanzina
- Produced by: Mario Cecchi Gori; Vittorio Cecchi Gori
- Starring: Jerry Calà; Christian De Sica; Claudio Amendola; Antonella Interlenghi
- Cinematography: Claudio Cirillo
- Edited by: Raimondo Crociani
- Music by: Manuel De Sica
- Release date: 1984
- Running time: 89 minutes
- Country: Italy
- Language: Italian

Vacanze in America (Holidays in America) is a 1984 Italian comedy film directed by Carlo Vanzina.

== Plot summary ==
Summer. In a high school in Rome, Don Buro, priest and religion teacher, leads a class of young people in a school holiday in the United States. Among the guys there is the repeating Peo, who decides to entertain the boys in his own way, including roulette bets and beautiful girls with whom to have sex. However Peo doesn't realize that Don Buro, to ensure peace, has brought in another companion: Mrs. De Romanis, mother of one of the boys.

== Cast ==
- Jerry Calà: Peo Colombo
- Christian De Sica: Don Buro
- Claudio Amendola: Alessio Liberatore
- Antonella Interlenghi: Antonella
- Edwige Fenech: Mrs De Romanis
- Gianmarco Tognazzi: Filippo De Romanis
- Fabio Ferrari: Furio Quintiliani
- Enzo Liberti: Alessio's Father

== See also ==
- List of Italian films of 1984
