= Gabicce Mare =

- Comune
- Comune di Gabicce Mare
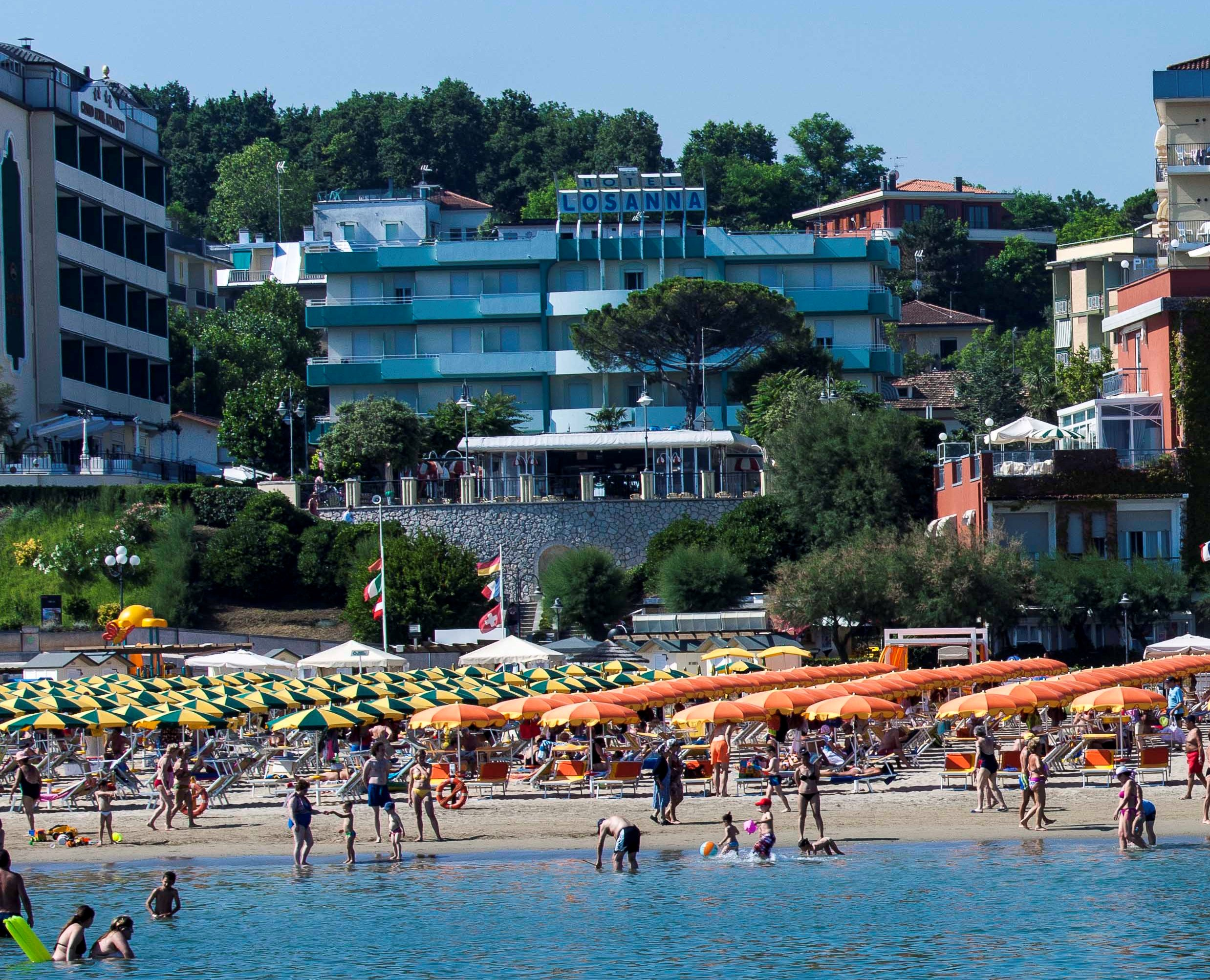
- View of Gabicce Mare

- Coat of arms

- Gabicce within the Province of Pesaro and Urbino

- Location within Italy Location within Marche
- Coordinates: 43°58′N 12°46′E
- Country: Italy
- Region: Marche
- Province: Pesaro e Urbino (PU)
- Frazioni: Baia Vallugola, Case Badioli, Gabicce Monte, Vigna del Mare

Government
  - Mayor: Domenico Pascuzzi

Area
  - Total: 4.9 km^{2} (1.9 sq mi)

Population (28 February 2009)
  - Total: 5,921
  - Density: 1,200/km^{2} (3,100/sq mi)
- Demonym: Gabiccesi
- Time zone: UTC+1 (CET)
  - Summer (DST): UTC+2 (CEST)
- Postal code: 61011
- Dialing code: 0541
- Patron saint: Saint Hermes
- Website: comune.gabicce-mare.pu.it

Gabicce Mare, also named Gabicce (Romagnol: Gabéc), is a town and comune (municipality) in the province of Pesaro and Urbino, in Italy, region Marche. It is located about 70 kilometres (43 mi) northwest of Ancona, 16 kilometres (10 mi) north of Pesaro, and is close to the borders with the province of Rimini, in Emilia-Romagna.

The village has once been a fisherman's place, but nowadays it is a summer tourist center with several beaches. The town is considered by some to be part of the historical region of Romagna, forming an extension of the riviera romagnola.

== Main sights ==
- Baia Imperiale. The nightclub, with its distinctive columns, has been used as a filming location for several Italian films, including Abbronzatissimi in 1991 and S.P.Q.R.: 2,000 and a Half Years Ago in 1994.

== Twin towns ==
- Ötigheim, Germany, since 1999
- Brussels, Belgium, since 2003
- Eguisheim, France, since 2007
