= Mara Venier =

Italian actress

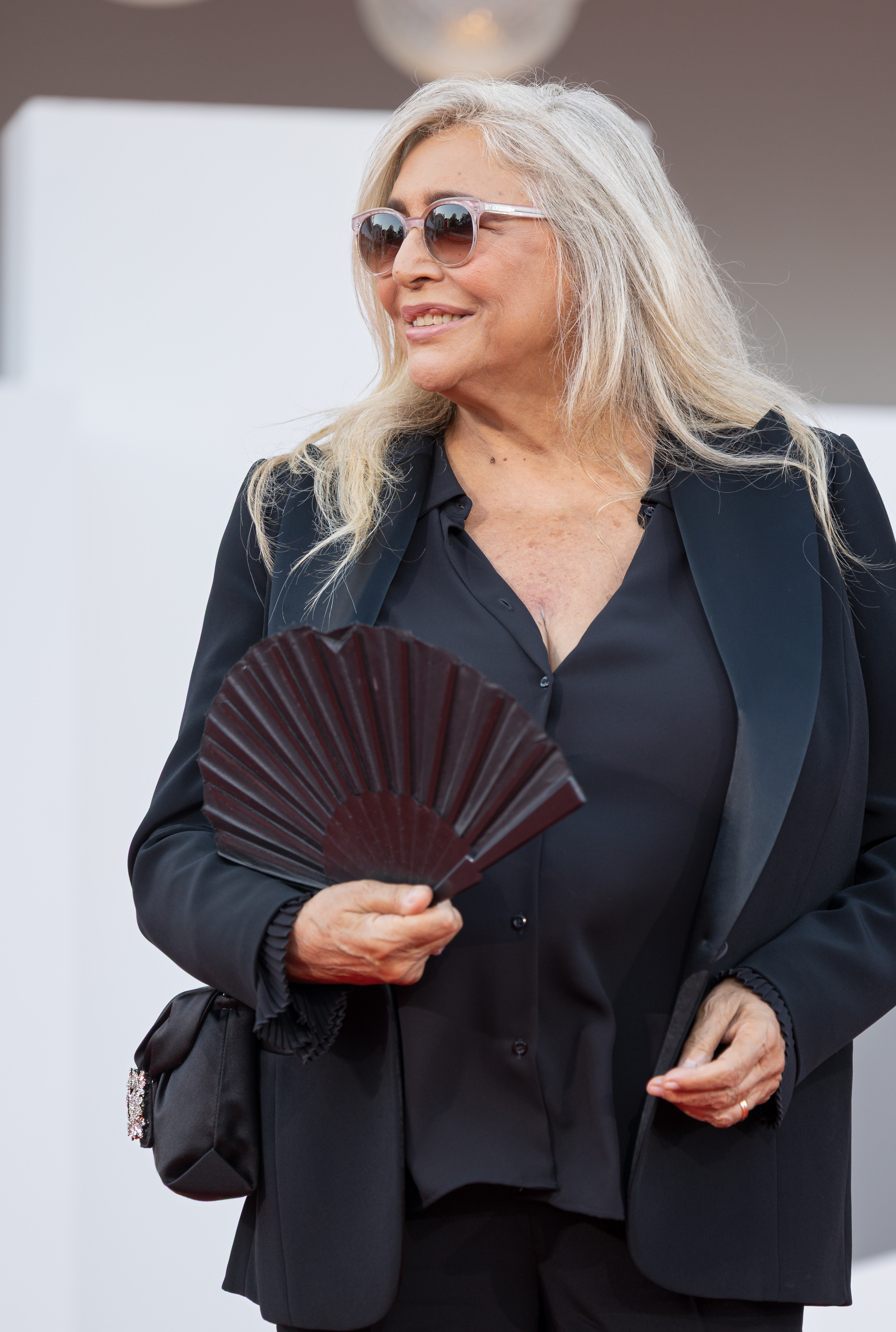
- Venier at the 82nd Venice International Film Festival in 2025
- Born: Mara Olga Povoleri; 20 October 1950 (age 75); Venice, Italy
- Occupations: Actress; television presenter
- Years active: 1971–present
- Spouses: Francesco Ferracini (divorced) Jerry Calà (m. 1984; div. 1985) Nicola Carraro (m. 2006)
- Partner: Armand Assante
- Children: 2

Mara Povoleri (born 20 October 1950), better known as Mara Venier (pronounced [ˈmaːra veˈnjɛr]), is an Italian actress and television presenter.

== Career ==
Venier made her debut with a main role in Diario di un italiano, a TV-series based on the novel Wanda written by Vasco Pratolini. She later starred in several films and TV-series, including Nanni Loy's Testa o croce and Pacco, doppio pacco e contropaccotto. She debuted as television hostess at 38, in the musical show Una rotonda sul mare, but her television career was launched in 1993 with the show Domenica in that she hosted until 1997 and again in 2001, 2002 and between 2004 and 2006, in 2013, and once again from 2018.

== Filmography ==
=== Films ===
Film performances with year released, title, role played and notes
Year	Title	Role	Notes
1973	Diario di un italiano	Wanda	
1974	La badessa di Castro	Giovanni's lover	Cameo appearance
1974	Abbasso tutti, viva noi	Elisa	
1976	Evil Thoughts	Miss Bocconi	
1979	Un'emozione in più	Daniela	
1980	Zappatore	Nancy Barker	
1981	E noi non faremo Karakiri	Serena	
1982	Heads I Win, Tails You Lose	Teresa	Segment "La pecorella smarrita"
1983	Al bar dello sport	Rossana	
1984	Chewingum	Emanuela Raveggi	
1987	Animali metropolitani	Esmeralda	
1987	Sweets from a Stranger	Stella	
1987	Kamikazen: Last Night in Milan	Caterina De Lellis	
1988	Delitti e profumi	Sister Melania	
1989	Night Club	Luciana	
1989	Il ritorno del grande amico	Alessandra	
1993	Pacco, doppio pacco e contro paccotto	Mrs. Scarano	
1998	Paparazzi	Herself	Cameo appearance
2008	Torno a vivere da solo	Herself	Cameo appearance
2011	Vacanze di Natale a Cortina	Herself	Cameo appearance
2015	Burning Love	Herself	Cameo appearance
2024	Diamonds	Silvana	
TBA	Nella gioia e nel dolore †	TBA	Post-production

=== Television ===
Television performances with year released, title, role played and notes
Year	Title	Role	Notes
1973	Door into Darkness	Daniela Moreschi	Episode: "La bambola"
1975	Diagnosi	Lucia	Episode: "Colpo basso"
1982	Un gusto molto particolare	Mara	Television film
1986	Atelier	Valerie Valle	Episode: "Vanità"
1987–1990	Candid Camera Show	Herself/ Co-host	Comedy show (seasons 2–5)
1987	Portami la luna	Fleur	Television film
1987	Professione vacanze	Olimpia	Recurring role; 4 episodes
1987	La famiglia Brandacci	Maria Antonia	Television film
1988	Troppo forti	Herself/ Host	Variety show
1989	Tutti in palestra	Mara	Miniseries
1990	Una rotonda sul mare	Herself/ Host	Musical show (season 2)
1991	...E compagnia bella...	Herself/ Host	Talk show
1991–1992	Cantagiro	Herself/ Co-host	Annual music festival
1992	Ora di punta	Herself/ Host	Talk show
1993	1993 Giffoni Film Festival	Herself/ Host	Annual ceremony
1993–present	Domenica In	Herself/ Host	Talk show (seasons 18–21, 26–27, 29–30, 38, 43–present)
1994	Vota la voce	Herself/ Guest host	Musical show (season 21)
1994–1997	Luna Park	Herself/ Host	Daily game show (Venier hosted only wednesday episodes)
1995	La voce del cuore	Stefania	Main role; 4 episodes
1995	Telegatto 1995	Herself/ Host	Annual ceremony
1995–1996	La Zingara	Herself/ Host	Daily game show (season 1)
1996	Il goal del Martin pescatore	Francesca	Television film
1996, 2011	La partita del cuore	Herself/ Co-host	Annual sports event
1997	Donna sotto le stelle	Herself/ Co-host	Fashion show (season 12)
1997	Ciao Mara	Herself/ Host	Talk show
1998	Ritornare a volare	Eleonora	Miniseries
1998	Canzoni sotto l'albero	Herself/ Host	Musical show (season 7)
2000	Fantastica italiana	Herself/ Host	Talent show (season 5)
2002–2003	Il castello	Herself/ Co-host	Game show
2003	Telefonate al buio	Herself/ Host	Game show
2007–2008; 2015–2018	L'isola dei famosi	Herself/ Regular guest	Reality show (seasons 5–6, 10–11, 13)
2007, 2010	Concerto di Natale	Herself/ Host	Annual concert
2009	La fattoria	Herself/ Interviewer	Reality show (season 4)
2010–2013	La vita in diretta	Herself/ Host	Talk show (seasons 21–23)
2010	L'anno che verrà	Herself/ Co-host	New Year's Eve special
2014–2017	Tú sí que vales	Herself/ Popular judge	Talent show (seasons 2–4)
2015	Striscia la notizia	Herself/ Guest host	Variety show (season 28)
2019–2020	La porta dei sogni	Herself/ Host	Talk show
2021	Zecchino d'Oro	Herself/ Host	Musical show (season 63)
2024	Gloria	Herself	Episode: "Il piano"
2024	Le stagioni dell'amore	Herself/ Host	Reality show
2025	Ne vedremo delle belle	Herself/Judge	Talent show competition
