= Al bar dello sport =

- Directed by: Francesco Massaro
- Written by: Enrico Oldoini; Francesco Massaro; Enrico Vanzina; Franco Ferrini
- Starring: Lino Banfi; Jerry Calà; Mara Venier; Annie Belle; Mirella Banti
- Cinematography: Luigi Kuveiller
- Music by: Detto Mariano
- Release date: 10 May 1983
- Running time: 100 minutes
- Country: Italy
- Language: Italian

Al bar dello sport (At the Bar Sport) is a 1983 Italian comedy film directed by Francesco Massaro.

== Plot ==
The film tells the story about the misadventures of Lino, a penniless Apulian immigrant in Turin, after he won 1.3 billion lire at Totocalcio.

== Cast ==
- Lino Banfi: Lino
- Jerry Calà: Parola
- Mara Venier: Rossana
- Franco Barbero (actor): Felice
- Annabella Schiavone: Bianca
- Pino Ammendola: Gaetano
- Sergio Vastano: Ciccio
- Enzo Andronico: Mr. Andronico
- Maurizio Mauri : Leo
- Annie Belle : Martine, a French prostitute
- Andrea Ciccolella : Marcolino, Lino's nephew
- Tognella
- Leonardo Cassio : Don Raffaele
- Enzo Andronico : Mr. Andronico, the fishmonger
- Eolo Capritti : Notary Magalini
- Ennio Antonelli : Don Raffaele's henchman
- Omero Capanna : Don Raffaele's henchman
