= Mauro Di Francesco =

Italian actor and comedian (1951–2025)

- Born: 17 May 1951; Milan, Italy
- Died: 25 October 2025 (aged 74)
- Occupation: Actor
- Years active: 1964–2019

Mauro Di Francesco (17 May 1951 – 25 October 2025) was an Italian actor, comedian and television personality.

== Life and career ==
Born in Milan, Di Francesco started his career in the mid-1960s as a child actor appearing in some RAI miniseries. In the 1970s, he started performing as a comedian at the Derby Club, a cabaret nightclub in his hometown. In the 1980s, after appearing as a sidekick of Diego Abatantuono in a number of films, he had the peak of his career starring in a number of teen comedies. Also active on stage and on television, following an alcohol abuse problem in 2011 Di Francesco underwent a liver transplant. He died on 25 October 2025, at the age of 74.

== Selected filmography ==
- I fichissimi (1981)
- Il paramedico (1982)
- An Ideal Adventure (1982)
- Scusa se è poco (1982)
- Attila flagello di Dio (1982)
- Sapore di mare 2 - Un anno dopo (1983)
- Il ras del quartiere (1983)
- Summer Games (1984)
- Chewingum (1984)
- The Barber of Rio (1996)
- Gli inaffidabili (1997)
- Really SSSupercool: Chapter Two (2006)
- Odissea nell'ospizio (2019)
