= Banzai (1997 film) =

- Directed by: Carlo Vanzina
- Written by: Carlo Vanzina; Enrico Vanzina
- Starring: Paolo Villaggio
- Cinematography: Sergio Salvati
- Edited by: Sergio Montanari
- Music by: Federico De Robertis
- Release date: September 1997
- Running time: 83 minutes
- Country: Italy
- Language: Italian

Banzai is a 1997 Italian comedy film directed by Carlo Vanzina. It is a sequel to 1995 film I Don't Speak English.

== Cast ==
- Paolo Villaggio as Sergio Colombo
- Antonio Ballerio as Sergio's principal
- Francesca Romana Coluzzi as Ilaria
- Francesco De Rosa as Pasquale Cuccurullo
- Roberto Della Casa as Sergio's colleague
- Laura Migliacci as Betta Colombo
- John Armstead as mister Parker
- Francesca Ventura as Paola
- Haruhiko Yamanouchi as Japanese officer
- Taiyo Yamanouchi as Japanese officer
