= Ragazzi della notte =

- Directed by: Jerry Calà
- Written by: Jerry Calà; Gino Capone
- Starring: Jerry Calà
- Cinematography: Marco Sperduti
- Edited by: Brunetto Casalini
- Music by: La Bionda
- Release date: 24 November 1995
- Running time: 102 minutes
- Country: Italy
- Language: Italian

Ragazzi della notte (lit. 'Children of the night') is a 1995 Italian comedy-drama film directed by Jerry Calà.

== Cast ==
- Jerry Calà as himself
- Francesca Rettondini as Sonia
- Alessia Merz as Lory
- Sergio Vastano as Adrenalina
- Maria Monsè as Samantha
- Alessandra Di Sanzo as Giovanna
- Ivan Venini as Schizzo
- Fabio Testi as Schizzo's father
- Walter Nudo as Tony
- Valerio Staffelli as Corrado
- Dario Cassini as Beppe
- Victoria Cabello as Sylvie
- Samantha de Grenet as Livia
- Matteo Chioatto as Mirco
- Solange
