= Cinzia Leone =

Italian actress and comedian

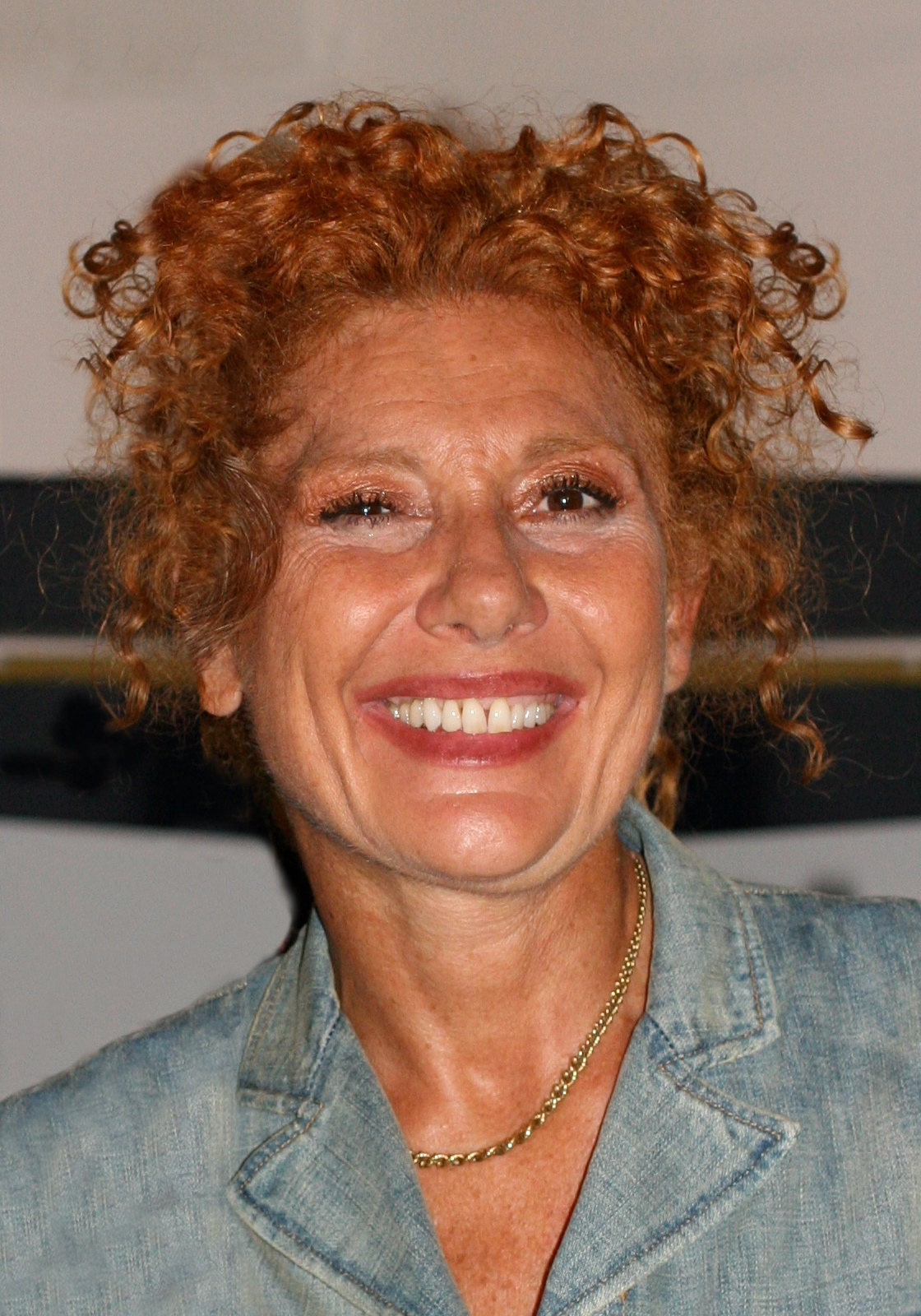
- Leone in 2008
- Born: 4 March 1959 (age 67); Rome, Italy
- Occupation: Actress

Cinzia Leone (born 4 March 1959) is an Italian actress and comedian.

== Life and career ==
Born in Rome, Italy, Leone began working in the theater since 1981, but became popular thanks to the participation to several variety shows of good success broadcast by Rai 3 (La TV delle ragazze, Scusate l'interruzione, Avanzi, Tunnel). She is also active in films, mainly used for short but often effective character roles.

In 1991 Leone suffered a congenital aneurysm of the basilar artery, undergoing a complicated surgery in Phoenix, Arizona, which had a mortality rate of 80%. She was paralyzed on the left side of the body but was able to recover completely. She eventually went back to work after a long absence.

== Selected filmography ==
- Le finte bionde (1989)
- Stasera a casa di Alice (1990)
- Donne con le gonne (1991)
- Parenti serpenti (1992)
- Selvaggi (1995)
- The Blue Collar Worker and the Hairdresser in a Whirl of Sex and Politics (1996)
- Nero bifamiliare (2007)
- Nemici per la pelle (2006)
- Sympathy for the Lobster (2007)
