= Le finte bionde =

1989 film by Carlo Vanzina

- Directed by: Carlo Vanzina
- Written by: Carlo Vanzina; Enrico Vanzina
- Produced by: Achille Manzotti
- Starring: Cinzia Leone
- Narrated by: Oreste Lionello
- Release date: 10 March 1989
- Running time: 92 minutes
- Country: Italy
- Language: Italian

Le finte bionde (lit. 'The fake blondes') is a 1989 Italian comedy film directed by Carlo Vanzina.

== Cast ==
- Cinzia Leone as Graziella
- Cinzia Bonfantini as Sandra
- Alessandra Casella as Francesca
- Bruna Feirri as Patrizia
- Paola Quattrini as Giovanna
- Francesca Reggiani as Turchese
- Emanuela Rossi as Elena
- Lucia Stara as Mara
- Sergio Vastano as Luigi
- Guido Nicheli as Roberto
- Massimo Wertmüller as Giovanni
- Isaac George as Garcia
- Vincenzo Crocitti as Felice
- Maurizio Mattioli as Egidio
- Antonello Fassari as Carlo
- Pino Insegno as "Raging Dull"
- Licia Colò as "Ordinary People" wife
- Claudio Fattoretto as "Ordinary People" husband
- Oreste Lionello as the narrator
