= Selvaggi (film) =

- Directed by: Carlo Vanzina
- Written by: Carlo Vanzina; Enrico Vanzina
- Starring: Ezio Greggio; Leo Gullotta; Antonello Fassari; Monica Scattini; Cinzia Leone; Emilio Solfrizzi; Cash Casia; Michele Merkin; Carmela Vincenti; Franco Oppini
- Cinematography: Gianlorenzo Battaglia
- Edited by: Sergio Montanari
- Music by: Federico De Robertis
- Distributed by: Medusa
- Release date: 15 December 1995
- Running time: 85 minutes
- Country: Italy
- Language: Italian
- Box office: 6.1 billion lira (Italy)

Selvaggi (lit. 'Savages') is a 1995 Italian comedy film directed by Carlo Vanzina.

== Cast ==
- Ezio Greggio as Bebo
- Leo Gullotta as Luigi Pinardi
- Antonello Fassari as Mario Nardone
- Monica Scattini as Carlina
- Cinzia Leone as Cinzia Nardone
- Emilio Solfrizzi as Felice
- Cash Casia as Cindy
- Michele Merkin as Linda
- Carmela Vincenti as Marisa Pinardi
- Franco Oppini as Jimmy
- Isaac George as the pilot
- Paolo Tomei as Edo
- Margherita Volo as Daniela Bellotti
- Margherita Suppini as Elena
- Antonio Melidoni as Fabio
