= Il ragazzo del Pony Express =

- Theatrical release poster
- Directed by: Franco Amurri
- Starring: Jerry Calà; Isabella Ferrari; Alessandro Benvenuti
- Cinematography: Giuseppe Berardini
- Edited by: Raimondo Crociani
- Music by: Umberto Smaila
- Release dates: November 21, 1986 (Turin, Italy)
- Language: Italian

Il ragazzo del Pony Express is a 1986 Italian comedy film. It marked the directorial debut of Franco Amurri.

== Plot summary ==
Milan, Italy mid-1980s. After graduating with honors, Agostino (nicknamed "Ago") is seeking employment. After escaping the set of a pornographic film, he is hired by a courier agency and encounters many troubles.

== Cast ==
- Jerry Calà: Agostino
- Isabella Ferrari: Claudia
- Alessandro Benvenuti: ragioniere
- Emanuela Taschini: Rita
- Sergio Di Pinto: Orso
- Tiberio Murgia: Doorman
- Fiammetta Baralla: Marmitta
- Corrado Olmi: Agostino's father
- Nerina Montagnani: Agostino's aunt

== Release ==
Il ragazzo del Pony Express was released in Turin, Italy on November 21, 1986.

== See also ==
- List of Italian films of 1986
