= Cesare Gelli =

Italian actor and voice actor (1932–2016)

- Born: 28 November 1932; Rome, Italy
- Died: 27 August 2016 (aged 83); Rome, Italy
- Occupation: Actor

Cesare Gelli (28 November 1932 – 27 August 2016) was an Italian actor and voice actor.

== Life and career ==
Born in Rome, Gelli started his career as part of several theatrical companies, and later acting in some RAI radio and television dramas. He made his film debut in 1962, with a minor role in Luciano Salce's A Girl... and a Million.

Mainly cast in supporting roles, Gelli was specialised in roles of high-rank politicians and professionals. He played Cimosco in several theatrical editions of Orlando Furioso directed by Luca Ronconi, and Don Nicolò Paritelli in three editions of Rugantino. Gelli died in Rome on 27 August 2016, at the age of 83.

== Filmography ==
Year	Title	Role	Notes
1962	A Girl... and a Million	The Bespectacled Advertising Man	
1965	Thrilling	Cesarino	(segment "Il vittimista")
1966	Madamigella di Maupin	Second Maestro	
1966	The Hawks and the Sparrows		Uncredited
1966	Non faccio la guerra, faccio l'amore		
1966	È mezzanotte... butta giù il cadavere	Ernesto	
1966	Perdono	Galimberti	
1967	The Seventh Floor	Dr. Paul Denning	
1967	Riderà! (Cuore matto)	Barluzzi	
1968	La notte è fatta per... rubare	John	
1968	Donne... botte e bersaglieri	Ambrogio	
1968	Be Sick... It's Free	Doctor-Colleague in hospital	
1968	The Black Sheep	Television commentator	
1970	Let's Have a Riot		
1972	La calandria	Ferruccio Consagra	
1974	All Screwed Up	Cook	
1976	Todo modo	Arras	
1979	Lobster for Breakfast	Invitato Franzi	
1979	Sette uomini d'oro nello spazio		
1980	Terror Express		
1980	Arrivano i gatti	Il regista	
1993	The Bilingual Lover	Sr. Valentí	
1993	Mille bolle blu	Decio Rossi	
1994	S.P.Q.R.: 2,000 and a Half Years Ago	Procuratore capo	
2002	Febbre da cavallo – La mandrakata		(final film role)
