= Summer Games (1984 film) =

- Directed by: Bruno Cortini
- Written by: Cesare Frugoni; Bruno Cortini; Enrico Vanzina
- Starring: Massimo Ciavarro; Corinne Cléry; Natasha Hovey
- Cinematography: Giorgio Di Battista
- Music by: Totò Savio
- Release date: 1984
- Language: Italian

Summer Games (Italian: Giochi d'estate) is a 1984 Italian teen comedy film written and directed by Bruno Cortini.

== Plot ==
In Porto Rotondo the stories of love and jealousy of a group of young people follow one another, including boat trips, beach games and parties in the villas and clubs of the Costa Smeralda.

== Cast ==
- Massimo Ciavarro as Brando
- Natasha Hovey as Ale Donelli
- Mauro Di Francesco as Gianni Perego
- Corinne Cléry as Lisa Donelli
- Karina Huff as Ambra Carimati
- Fabio Testi as Roberto Ripa
- Lidia Broccolino as Zaccaria, a.k.a. Zac
- Valeria Cavalli as Teodora Theodoli, a.k.a. Teo
- Andrea Prodan as the Marquis
- Guido Nicheli as Gino Carimati, a.k.a. Nogi
- Odoacre Chierico as Himself
- Francesco Graziani as Himself

== See also ==
- List of Italian films of 1984
