= Jonathan Kashanian =

Israeli–Italian television personality and actor

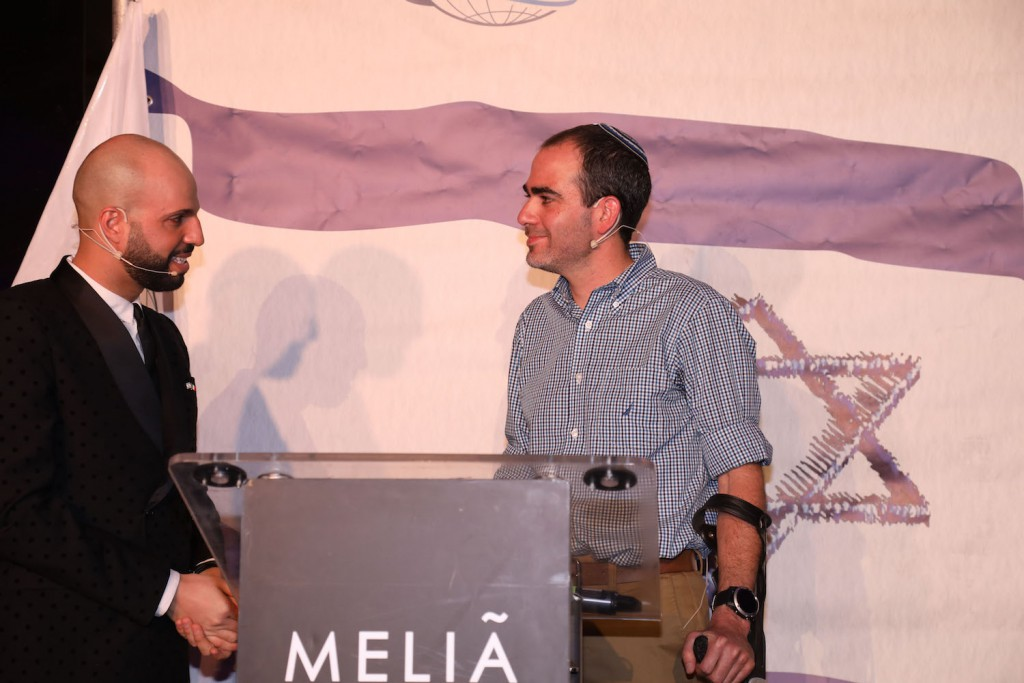

Yehonatan Kashanian (born 15 January 1981), known professionally as Jonathan Kashanian, is an Israeli–Italian television personality and actor.

== Biography ==
Kashanian was born in Ramat Gan, Israel, the son of Iranian Jewish parents, and grandson of Uzbekistani grandparents, who emigrated to Milan when he was three years old. In the early 2000s he chose the path of fashion; after graduating as a designer, he worked between fashion shows and showrooms.

== Career ==
In 2004, on Canale 5, Kashanian participated in the fifth edition of Grande Fratello and won the reality show with 38% of the vote. In 2005 he was in the jury of Sei un mito on Canale 5.

For three years (2005–08), Kashanian was a host of Modeland, a fashion segment on All Music. From 2006 to 2016 he appeared on Verissimo, first as a regular guest, then later as an envoy, columnist, fashion expert, stylist and makeover designer.

In 2007 he takes part in the film 2061: An Exceptional Year. He moved to La7 as a commentator on Pietro Chiambretti's talkshow, Markette – Tutto fa brodo in TV, which was succeeded in 2009 by Chiambretti Night on Italia 1. In 2010 he participated in a cameo in the film A Natale mi sposo directed by Paolo Costella.

In 2018 he participated as a contestant in the thirteenth edition of L'isola dei famosi, hosted by Alessia Marcuzzi and aired on Canale 5, ranking fifth, being eliminated with 70% of the votes.

He is currently a radio host for RTL 102.5.

In 2022 he participated in Back to School, a program hosted by Nicola Savino on Italia 1. In the same year, he was among the jurors of Miss Italia and co-hosted the final night of Una voce per San Marino, a national final to select the Sammarinese representative at the Eurovision Song Contest 2022.

In September 2026, he joined the cast of Grande Fratello VIP (season 9).
