= I Don't Speak English =

- Italian: Io no spik inglish
- Directed by: Carlo Vanzina
- Written by: Carlo Vanzina; Enrico Vanzina
- Produced by: Fulvio Lucisano
- Starring: Paolo Villaggio
- Edited by: Sergio Montanari
- Music by: Federico De Robertis
- Release date: 26 October 1995
- Running time: 93 minutes
- Country: Italy
- Language: Italian

I Don't Speak English (Italian: Io no spik inglish) is a 1995 Italian comedy film directed by Carlo Vanzina.

A sequel entitled Banzai was released in 1997.

== Cast ==
- Paolo Villaggio as Sergio Colombo
- Paola Quattrini as Paola Colombo
- Laura Migliacci as Betta Colombo
- Ian Price as Frederick Livingstone
- Carolyn Pickles as Linda Livingstone
- Chiara Noschese as Patrizia
- Giorgio Biavati as Giovanni
- Stefania Spugnini as Francesca
- Maurizio Marsala as Giovanni Spadella
- Mario Bianco as Tony Pinardi
- Mauro La Giglia as Alfredo Della Torre
- Matteo Dondi as Cesare Scotto
- Matteo Pagano as Dario Scotto

== Reception ==
I Don't Speak English opened at number six at the Italian box office and reached number one in its third week of release.
