= Figlio delle stelle =

- Directed by: Carlo Vanzina
- Written by: Carlo Vanzina; Enrico Vanzina
- Produced by: Achille Manzotti
- Starring: Alan Sorrenti
- Music by: Alan Sorrenti
- Release date: 1979
- Running time: 90 minutes
- Country: Italy
- Language: Italian

Figlio delle stelle (lit. 'Son of the Stars') is a 1979 Italian comedy film directed by Carlo Vanzina starring Alan Sorrenti. It is named after Sorrenti's hit song "Figli delle stelle".

== Cast ==
- Alan Sorrenti as Daniel
- Jennifer as Barbara
- Annie Marie Carell as Gloria
- Tommy Polgár as Tumba
