= Vanzina =

Vanzina is a surname. Notable people with the surname include:

- Carlo Vanzina (1951-2018), Italian film director, producer, and screenwriter, son of Stefano
- Stefano Vanzina (1915–1988), Italian film director, screenwriter, and cinematographer
