= Rebecca Staffelli =

Italian television presenter, radio personality and model (born 1998)

- Born: 22 May 1998 (age 28); Milan, Lombardy, Italy
- Occupations: Television presenter; radio personality; model
- Height: 1.75 m (5 ft 8.90 in)
- Partner: Alessandro Basile
- Parents: Valerio Staffelli (father); Matilde Zarcone (mother)
- Relatives: Riccardo Staffelli (brother)

Rebecca Staffelli (born 22 May 1998) is an Italian television presenter, radio personality and model.

== Biography ==
Born in Milan in 1998, Staffelli is the daughter of Valerio Staffelli, a correspondent of Striscia la notizia, and his wife Matilde Zarcone; she has an older brother.

After living his childhood in Rome, as a teenager she moved with her family to Milan, where she went to high school. After obtaining her diploma, she initially decided to undertake university studies in the United States but finally chose to start working in the entertainment world.

== Career ==
In 2018, Staffelli was invited to host Colpo di tacchi on La5, and later started working as a model.

In 2019 she competed in La5's Gym me 5 and subsequently hosted the Miss Universo Italia beauty contest. The same year she made her debut as a television actress taking the role of Sister Clementina in Din Don – Il ritorno directed by Paolo Geremei. In 2019 and 2020 she was a commentator on the television programs Pomeriggio Cinque and Domenica Live, both broadcast on Canale 5 hosted by Barbara D'Urso. In 2020 she was the testimonial of the Pashbag my Bag advertising campaign.

In 2021 she made her debut as a radio host on the Radio 105 program 105 Holidays. From 10 January 2022 to 20 December 2024, together with Alessandro Sansone, she has hosted the radio program 105 Night Express, also broadcast on Radio 105. Also in 2022, together with Mariasole Pollio, she hosted the musical event Coca Cola Summer Festival, broadcast on Radio 105 TV, and acted in the sequel to Paolo Geremei's television film Din Don – Il ritorno, titled Din Don – Un paese in due, again in the role of Sister Clementina. In 2022 and 2023, she participated in the twenty-second edition of the musical talent show Amici di Maria De Filippi, representing RadioMediaset.

In 2023, together with Mariasole Pollio, she hosted the musical event Tezenis Summer Festival, broadcast on Radio 105 TV. She performed as a promotor of the Global Hair & Beauty Ambassador brand for K-time and Jvone Milano products. In the summer of the same year, she presented Giffoni Music Concept, at the Giffoni Film Festival. In both 2023 and 2024, she was selected as social correspondent in the seventeenth edition of Grande Fratello, broadcast on Canale 5 and hosted by Alfonso Signorini. In the summer of 2024 she was the testimonial of the Perla nera commercial and in the same period, together with Ilary Blasi and Alvin, she has hosted the musical program Battiti Live, broadcast on Radionorba and Canale 5.

From 16 September 2024 to 31 March 2025 she was reconfirmed as a social correspondent for the eighteenth edition of Grande Fratello. In the same edition of the reality show, from 30 September, she began to host the GF Daily, a spin-off aired in the early evening slot of La5 from Monday to Friday in which the events that recently happened inside the Grande Fratello house are narrated.

From 13 January 2025, after leaving Radio 105, he began hosting the radio program Belli felici, broadcast from Monday to Friday on R101. In April, Forbes Italia magazine included her among the under 30 Italians who will have the greatest impact in the future for the entertainment category. In the summer of the same year, together with Enzo Ferrari and Stefano Corti, he hosted the musical event Yoga Radio Estate, broadcast on Radio Bruno TV and Italia 1.

== Personal life ==
Since 2018, Staffelli has been romantically linked to Alessandro Basile.

== Controversies ==
In April 2022, Staffelli reported the Monza trapper Simone Rizzuto, known artistically as Mr. Rizzus, for defamation in connection with a sexist song in which her name is used several times, accompanied by clear incitements to violence. She also cited Simone P. of the Lombard municipality of Tirano, who had published the song on his social networks. The two then met in court in Monza, from where Staffelli said that she would have to move as she feared for her safety.

== Television programs ==
Year	Title	Network		Role
2018	Colpo di tacchi	La5		Host
2019	Gym me 5	La5		Herself / Contestant
2019	Miss Universo Italia	La5		Host
2019–2020	Pomeriggio Cinque	Canale 5		Opinionist
2019–2020	Domenica Live	Canale 5		Opinionist
2022	Coca Cola Summer Festival	Radio 105		Co-host
2022–2023	Amici di Maria De Filippi	Canale 5		As a representative of RadioMediaset
2023	Tezenis Summer Festival	Radio 105		Co-host
2023–2025	Grande Fratello	Canale 5		Head of Social Media
2024	Battiti Live	Canale 5		Co-host
2024–2025	GF Daily	La5		Host
2025	Yoga Radio Estate	Radio Bruno TV	Italia 1	Co-host

== Radio ==
Year	Title	Network	Role
2021	105 Holidays	Radio 105	Host
2022–2024	105 Night Express	Radio 105	Host
2025–present	Belli felici	R101	Host
