= Una vacanza bestiale =

- Directed by: Carlo Vanzina
- Written by: Carlo Vanzina; Enrico Vanzina
- Starring: Jerry Calà; Franco Oppini; Nini Salerno; Umberto Smaila
- Cinematography: Sandro D'Eva
- Edited by: Raimondo Crociani
- Music by: Umberto Smaila
- Release date: December 23, 1980
- Running time: 92 minutes
- Country: Italy
- Language: Italian

Una vacanza bestiale (lit. 'A beastly vacation') is a 1980 Italian comedy film directed by Carlo Vanzina.

== Cast ==
- Jerry Calà as Guido
- Franco Oppini as Livio Zanon
- Nini Salerno as Frustalupi
- Umberto Smaila as Eros Castiglioni
- Diego Abatantuono as Galeazzo
- Teo Teocoli as the Moroccan
- Lorella Morlotti as th tourist
