= The House of Clocks =

1989 TV film by Lucio Fulci

- DVD cover for The House of Clocks
- Italian: La casa nel tempo
- Genre: Horror
- Screenplay by: Daniele Stroppa; Gianfranco Clerici
- Story by: Lucio Fulci
- Directed by: Lucio Fulci
- Starring: Keith Van Hoven; Karina Huff; Paolo Paoloni; Bettine Milne; Al Cliver
- Composer: Vince Tempera
- Country of origin: Italy

Production
- Producers: Massimo Manasse; Marco Grillo Spina
- Cinematography: Nino Celeste
- Editor: Alberto Moriani
- Running time: 84 minutes
- Production companies: Dania Film; Reteitalia

The House of Clocks (Italian: La casa nel tempo) is an Italian horror film directed by Lucio Fulci. In it, a wealthy older couple is murdered during a robbery by three young perpetrators. The event results in a supernatural reversal of time, symbolized by the fast, counter-clockwise movement of hands on the house's many clocks. Eventually, this leads to the resurrection of the older couple, who subsequently seek to terrorize the three burglars.

== Plot ==
An elderly couple, Vittorio and Sara Corsini, live in a rambling country house filled with different clocks. Maid Maria starts suspecting that her employers are hiding something. She eventually discovers the dead bodies of a money-grabbing nephew and his wife lying preserved in open coffins in the wine cellar. While announcing her plans to quit, Maria is killed by Sara in the greenhouse the next morning.

Meanwhile, three hoodlums, Diana, Tony and Paul are driving through the area and decide to rob the house after receiving a tip-off from a grocery store owner in a nearby town about the wealth it supposedly contains. That evening, Diana talks her way into the household by pretending that her car broke down nearby and asks to use the phone. Soon, the phone lines are cut by her accomplices, and they force entry through an open window. Their plans go wrong when Peter intervenes with his shotgun. A bloodbath ensues with Sara accidentally getting shot, Peter getting killed by Paul, and Vittorio attacking Tony, forcing Diana to shoot him dead. The young trio are horrified by these deaths but decide to bundle the bodies away in a cupboard.

The criminals eventually notice that each clock there stopped at 8:00 PM, the exact time the couple died. The hoodlums try to leave, but are trapped indoors by Doberman Pinschers let loose to prowl the grounds. The clocks begin to move in reverse. The three decide to relax in the house overnight and head off upstairs to smoke joints. Diana and Tony begin to have sex.

Paul, meanwhile, wanders downstairs. He discovers that the bloodstains in the dining room where the killings took place disappeared, and then sees the bodies lying back where they had fallen. Before he can alert the others, Paul is shot by someone stalking the house. Hearing the gunshot, Diana and Tony get dressed, rush downstairs and see the old couple reanimate and advance towards them. In the kitchen, Diana is trapped by Sara, who grabs a knife and stabs her through the hand, pinning her to the kitchen table. Sara then retrieves a ring that Diana stole from her ring finger. Making an escape, Diana and Tony find a wounded Paul in the cellar. More time distortions continue as Diana's hand heals up. Diana and Tony escape from the cellar through a window and emerge into the grounds. Paul is too injured to hoist himself up to the window and is axed to death by Peter. As the couple run across the grounds, now in daylight with the clocks in full reverse, Tony is pulled into a shallow grave by Maria's corpse. She kills him with a wooden stick through his stomach. Maria then confronts the elderly couple in the wine cellar with murdering their nephew and his wife to remove them as their rightful heirs to the estate. The niece and nephew revive and the old couple are killed again by their previous victims. Diana staggers away from the house.

Diana, Tony, and Paul awaken outside the country house in their car. Apparently all that happened to them was just a dream brought on with special intensity by the marijuana they were smoking. Inside the house, nephew and niece enjoy being alive again and are having their morning breakfast, with Maria attending to them. The corpses of Vittorio and Sara are in the cellar, having been substituted for them.

Driving away from the house, Diana, Tony, and Paul remark on the similarities of their respective dreams. A dead cat they picked up on the road earlier revives and attacks them, forcing Tony to drive their car off a cliff and killing them all again. The car's clock and all the wristwatches on Diana, Tony, and Paul's corpse stop and begin to go backward.

== Cast ==
- Keith Van Hoven as Tony
- Karina Huff as Sandra
- Paolo Paoloni as Vittorio Corsini
- Bettine Milne as Sara Corsini
- Peter Hintz as Paul
- Carla Cassola as Maria
- Al Cliver as Peter
- Paolo Bernardi as The Nephew
- Francesca DeRose as The Niece
- Massimo Sarchielli as Storekeeper

== Production ==
The House of Clocks is one of four films made for the Italian television series La case maledette (transl. The Houses of Doom). The series was developed by Luciano Martino following the release of Brivido Giallo. The series was intended to be part of six films to be directed by Fulci, Umberto Lenzi and Lamberto Bava. Due to other commitments, Bava stepped out of the project to be replaced by Marcello Avallone, who also dropped out of the project leading to only four films being made. For his two films, Fulci asked to replace the two stories he was given with two of his own design. The films were shot on 16mm outside of Rome on a schedule of four weeks each. The House of Clocks was filmed in a villa in Torgiano between January 31 and February 25, 1989.

== Release ==
Along with the other films made for La case maledette, The House of Clocks was shelved. When asked about the films being released in the early 1990s, Fulci responded that the series had been sold to elsewhere in the world, they would have to ask Reiteitalia when they would be shown in Italy. The films were only shown in 2000 in Italy when they were released on VHS thanks to the efforts of the magazine Nocturno Cinema. It was screened on Quadrifoglio Odeon TV on January 23, 2001. They were shown on Italian satellite television in 2006. The film was released on DVD in the United States by Shriek Show on November 19, 2002.

Fulci spoke very positively on his two films made for La case maledette, calling them "Fantastic! Excellent Filmmaking!" and that they were "Two of his best films [he'd] made!".

== Reception ==
Robert Firsching of AllMovie called the film "a credible addition to the director's oeuvre – sometimes reminiscent of Dolls or Pete Walker's creepy punishment gothics (Frightmare, House of Whipcord, etc.) – and fans should give it a look".
