= Il ras del quartiere =

- Directed by: Carlo Vanzina
- Written by: Carlo Vanzina; Enrico Vanzina; Diego Abatantuono
- Starring: Diego Abatantuono; Lino Troisi; Isabella Ferrari; Lara Nakszyński; Mauro Di Francesco
- Cinematography: Luigi Kuveiller
- Edited by: Raimondo Crociani
- Music by: Goblin
- Release date: 1983
- Running time: 83 minutes
- Country: Italy
- Language: Italian

Il ras del quartiere (lit. 'The ras of the neighbourhood') is a 1983 Italian comedy film directed by Carlo Vanzina.

== Cast ==
- Diego Abatantuono as Domingo
- Isabella Ferrari as Veronica Gatti
- Lino Troisi as Tarcisio Gatti
- Daniel Stephen as Orson
- Antonio Allocca as the Brigadier
- Gianni Cajafa as the janitor
- Gianni Ansaldi as Arturo Beccalossi
- Lara Nakszyński as Lola
- Mauro Di Francesco as Jena

== Reception ==
Tullio Kezich criticized the script, "nothing more than a pretext to slip in a series of old avanspettacolo-style duets", with Abatantuono "talking nonstop for an hour and a half, like a radio left on" e Vanzina "following the Mattoli method: sets up the camera, calls the shot, and lets the actors run free to improvise their performances".
