= Vacanze di Natale =

1983 film

- Theatrical release poster by Renato Casaro
- Directed by: Carlo Vanzina
- Written by: Carlo Vanzina; Enrico Vanzina
- Produced by: Aurelio De Laurentiis; Luigi De Laurentiis
- Starring: Jerry Calà; Christian De Sica; Karina Huff; Claudio Amendola; Antonella Interlenghi; Marilù Tolo; Stefania Sandrelli
- Cinematography: Claudio Cirillo
- Edited by: Raimondo Crociani
- Music by: Giorgio Calabrese
- Production company: Filmauro
- Distributed by: Gaumont
- Release date: 23 December 1983
- Running time: 97 minutes
- Country: Italy
- Language: Italian

Vacanze di Natale is a 1983 Italian Christmas comedy film directed by Carlo Vanzina.

It was shown as part of a retrospective on Italian comedy at the 67th Venice International Film Festival.

== Plot ==
During the Christmas season of 1983, two families from Rome — the Covelli and the Marchetti — meet in Cortina d'Ampezzo. The Covelli family appears affluent and refined, although certain behaviors suggest a parvenu background. The family includes a mother, a father, two sons and a daughter.

The Marchetti family is depicted as coarse and lower-middle-class. The father, played by Mario Brega, works as a butcher, while the son named Mario is portrayed by Claudio Amendola. Amendola’s character and the younger Covelli son are supporters of A.S. Roma and know each other well from attending football matches together. Their friendship brings the two families into contact despite their different social backgrounds.

The narrative follows the comedic interactions and misunderstandings that arise between the families. A parallel subplot features a penniless pianist who rekindles a relationship with his former girlfriend. Roberto Covelli is involved with an American girlfriend named Samantha, who receives little attention from him and is persistently courted by Mario Marchetti. The relationship between the two families develops through Mario’s acquaintance with a member of the Covelli family, who is unsettled by the Marchettis’ manners.

Over the course of the story, Samantha, Roberto’s girlfriend, becomes aware of Mario’s clumsy attempts to court her and spends a night with him before returning permanently to the United States. The Covelli family later discovers, with surprise, that their younger son Roberto is gay.

One year later, the two families meet again during a summer holiday in Sardinia, leading to a new series of humorous situations.

== Cast ==
- Jerry Calà as Billo, the pianist
- Christian De Sica as Roberto Covelli
- Karina Huff as Samantha
- Claudio Amendola as Mario Marchetti
- Antonella Interlenghi as Serenella
- Riccardo Garrone as Giovanni Covelli
- Rossella Como as Signora Covelli
- Guido Nicheli as Donatone
- Marco Urbinati as Luca Covelli
- Mario Brega as Arturo Marchetti
- Rossana Di Lorenzo as Erminia Marchetti
- Marilù Tolo as Grazia Tassoni
- Stefania Sandrelli as Ivana
- Roberto Della Casa as Cesare
- Paolo Baroni as Collosecco
- Licinia Lentini as Moira
- Moana Pozzi as Luana
- Clara Colosimo as Farmacista
- Pino Locchi as Narrator (voice)

== Production ==
The movie was shot for only three weeks, in the Fall of 1983. The shooting occurred almost completely in the ski resorts of Faloria and Cortina d'Ampezzo.

Critics and even the producers have framed the movie as a direct representation of the status symbols of the time, without any insertions of social criticism, despite the fact that there are some contradictions between social ambitions of the characters in the movie. The increased well-being of the Italian society in the 1980s is represented by the high- end vacation spots chosen for shooting.

One can note the differences between the quality of the villa inhabited by the Covelli family and the five star hotel where some protagonists are guests (Guido Nicheli, Stefania Sandrelli, and others) and, on the other side, the 3 star hotel (Hotel Fanes, closed since 2002), where the Marchetti family are guests.

On the other hand the common areas of the VIP Club where Jerry Calà plays the piano, or the central Corso Italia, symbolize the tentaqtive of social ramping and the apparent equalization of the characters, due to the crossing of interests and passions.,

== Promotion ==
Renato Casaro prepared the manifests for the movie promotion to the movie theaters.

== Distribution ==
The movie was distributed in the Italian theaters starting from 23 December 1983.

The movie has been issued in different VHS formats, initially produced by the De Laurentis - Ricordi Video and distributed by the Univideo, was then reprinted both by RCS Edizioni and by Filmauro Home Video with distribution Aurelio De Laurentis Multimedia.

On 15 December 2003 a commemorative evening celebrated the 20th anniversary of the movie.

== Reception ==
=== Revenue ===
At the box office the movie cashed 2,939,774,000 Italian Liras. classifying at the 9th spot for 1983-1984 in Italy.

=== Critics ===
The movie, modelled after the 1959 Vacanze d'inverno of Camillo Mastrocinque, was well received from the critics at the time of issuance. Several writers appreciated the director's gusto, drama and a little bit of sentimentalism. In addition several good actors were mixed with experienced ones, similar to what had happened in the Sapore di mare movie. Further critics gave to the movie the merit of photographing directly the characteristics and the contradictions of the 1980s, distinguished by several classes, an increasing well-being, and an appearing possibility of common interests of such classes.
