= Private Affairs (1987 film) =

- Directed by: Francesco Massaro
- Written by: Suso Cecchi d'Amico; Franco Ferrini; Francesco Massaro; Enrico Vanzina
- Starring: Kate Capshaw
- Cinematography: Luigi Kuveiller
- Music by: Celso Valli
- Release date: 1987
- Running time: 101 minutes

Ti presento un'amica (internationally released as Private Affairs and Quite by Chance) is a 1987 romantic comedy film directed by Francesco Massaro.

At the time of the release, it was referred as a "typical example of average film that in Italy seems to have completely disappeared". The film has a longer 180 minute version.

== Cast ==
- Giuliana De Sio as Nagra
- Michele Placido as Lionello
- Kate Capshaw as Brunetta
- David Naughton as Mauro
- Luca Barbareschi as Claudio
- Carolina Rosi as Marina
- Sergio Fantoni as Io Speckler
- Lina Polito
