= Antonello Fassari =

Italian actor and comedian (1952–2025)

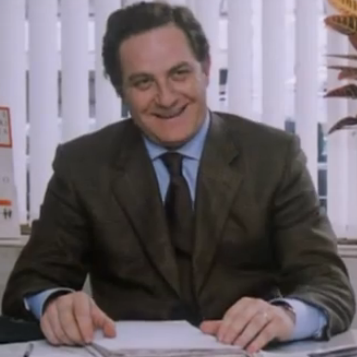
- Fassari in Le finte bionde (1989)
- Born: 4 October 1952; Rome, Italy
- Died: 5 April 2025 (aged 72); Rome, Italy
- Occupations: Actor, comedian
- Years active: 1977–2024
- Height: 1.73 m (5 ft 8 in)

Antonello Fassari (4 October 1952 – 5 April 2025) was an Italian actor and comedian.

== Life and career ==
Antonello Fassari was born in Rome, where he practiced gymnastics at a competitive level until age 18. In the mid-1970s he attended the Silvio D'Amico National Academy of Dramatic Arts, and then Teatro Laboratorio in 1977 under director by Luca Ronconi, with whom he later worked in numerous stage plays. Occasionally a singer-songwriter, in 1984 he composed one of the first Italian rap songs, "Roma di notte".

After several roles on stage, television, and in films, his breakout came in 1991 with the Rai Tre variety show Avanzi.

In 2000, Antonello Fassari made his directorial debut with the comedy film Il segreto del giaguaro, which was a resounding flop at the box office.

From 2006 to 2014, Fassari was part of the leading cast in the Italian television series I Cesaroni.

Fassari considered himself Roman Catholic. He died in Rome on 5 April 2025, at the age of 72.

== Selected filmography ==
- Fatto su misura (1985)
- Italian Fast Food (1986)
- Italian Postcards (1987)
- Casa mia, casa mia... (1988)
- Maya (1989)
- Le finte bionde (1989)
- Valentina (1989)
- Dark Illness (1990)
- Faccione (1991)
- The Invisible Wall (1991)
- Count Max (1991)
- Un'altra vita (1992)
- Sognando la California (1992)
- State Secret (1995)
- Waiters (1995)
- Who Killed Pasolini? (1995)
- Selvaggi (1995)
- Celluloide (1996)
- E adesso sesso (2001)
- Love Returns (2004)
- Romanzo Criminale (2005)
- The Goodbye Kiss (2006)
- Sympathy for the Lobster (2007)
- Box Office 3D: The Filmest of Films (2011)
- The Move of The Penguin (2013)
- Suburra (2015)
- Solo (2016)
- All You Need Is Crime (2019)
- L'agenzia dei bugiardi (2019)
- Flaminia (2024)
