= Nina Soldano =

Italian actress

- Born: 26 March 1963 (age 63); Pisa
- Occupation: actress
- Spouse: Teo Bordagni (m. 2016)

Nina Soldano (born 26 March 1963) is an Italian actress.

== Life and career ==
Born in Pisa to Apulian parents, Soldano made her debut in the 1987 Renzo Arbore's variety show Indietro tutta, in which she played the role of Miss Sud, and went on to appear in films, such as Night of the Sharks (1988), Delitti e profumi (1988), Paprika (1991), Fatalità (1992) and Fatal Frames (1996). Also active on stage, Soldano is better known for her roles in several TV-series, notably the Rai 3 soap-opera Un posto al sole, in which she played the character of Marina Giordano since 2003.

== Personal life ==
She is married to Teo Bordagni; she considers herself Roman Catholic.
