= Valerio Staffelli =

Italian journalist and television personality (born 1963)

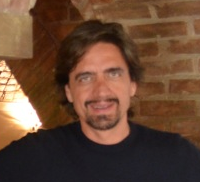
- Valerio Staffelli in 2013
- Born: 15 October 1963 (age 62); Milan, Italy
- Occupations: Journalist; television personality
- Height: 1.88 m (6 ft 2 in)
- Spouse: Matilde Zarcone (m. 1994)
- Children: Riccardo Staffelli; Rebecca Staffelli

Valerio Staffelli (born 15 October 1963) is an Italian journalist and television personality.

== Biography ==
Son of Gennaro Staffelli, who died in 2020, and Gigliola Forti, both merchants. Staffelli made his radio debut in 1978 on Radio Capo Nord Milano, and subsequently worked for other Milanese radio stations (Radio Omega, Teleradio International, Radio Capital). His debut as a television and film actor came in 1984, with the variety show Sponsor City (Rete 4). That same year, he appeared with Diego Abatantuono in the sitcom Diego 100% (Euro TV).

In the 1996–1997 edition he became a correspondent for Striscia la notizia. He is best known for his role as the bearer of the Tapiro d'oro, a satirical prize awarded to people who, in the opinion of the programme's editorial staff, have been protagonists of unpleasant or unfortunate events. Reactions to his awards are often unpredictable: some accept the statuette boasting of having won it, some try to avoid it without making any statements, and some display violent reactions towards the journalist. Since 2007 he has also been involved in investigations for Antonio Ricci's successful programme.

Staffelli was the creator and host of the program Al vostro posto, which aired on Radio 24 from 2001 to 2007. He also hosted Striscia la domenica, the Sunday version of the program of the same name. He appeared in the episode La statua di cera of the sitcom Casa Vianello, in three seasons of Scherzi a parte (with a total of 70 gags), and, also for Mediaset, in the program I guastafeste.

He has appeared as an actor in Gabriele Salvatores' films Kamikazen: Last Night in Milan and Nirvana, and in Jerry Calà's Ragazzi della notte. He also appeared in the episode Un giorno di ordinaria normalità of the sitcom Camera Café and in Neri Parenti's film Christmas in Love, appearing in a deleted scene where he delivers the golden tapir to Ronn Moss. He also appears in the music video for "Viva la mamma", a song by Edoardo Bennato. He has been a member of the Milan Order of Journalists since 1999 and has written for various publications, including Gente Motori, Tutto Moto, News, Il nostro budget, Quotidiano Nazionale, Leggo, Golf Punk, Oggi, Sciare Magazine and Golf e Turismo. He writes and produces videos for the official magazine of the Carabinieri, Il Carabiniere. In 2022, he starred in the television film Din Don – Un paese in due, starring Enzo Salvi.

== Personal life ==
Since 1994 married to showgirl Matilde Zarcone, he has two children, Riccardo and Rebecca, the latter a television, radio personality and model.

== Filmography ==
=== Film ===
Year	Title	Role	Notes
1988	Kamikazen: Last Night in Milan	Gangster	
1988	The Camels		
1995	Ragazzi della notte	Corrado	
1997	Nirvana	2nd Solver	
2022	Din Don – Un paese in due	Psychiatrist	TV film

=== Television ===
Year	Title	Role	Network	Notes
1985	Diego 100%		Euro TV	Sitcom
1996	Casa Vianello	Card Player I	Canale 5	Sitcom, episode 6x02
2006	Camera Café		Italia 1	Sitcom, episode 3x166

== Television programs ==
Year	Title	Network	Role
	Italia mia	Rai 1	Envoy
1992	Scherzi a parte	Italia 1	Envoy
1993–1994	Scherzi a parte	Canale 5	Envoy
	Ultimo minuto	Rai 3	Envoy
1996	I guastafeste	Canale 5	Envoy
1997–present	Striscia la notizia	Canale 5	Envoy
2002	I gemelli	Italia 1	Envoy
2009–2013	Striscia la Domenica	Canale 5	Envoy
