= Il generale dorme in piedi =

- Directed by: Francesco Massaro
- Starring: Ugo Tognazzi
- Cinematography: Dario Di Palma
- Edited by: Ruggero Mastroianni
- Music by: Fiorenzo Carpi
- Release date: 1972
- Language: Italian

Il generale dorme in piedi (The general sleeps standing up) is a 1972 commedia all'italiana. It represents the directorial debut of Francesco Massaro and it is based on a novel with the same name written by Giuseppe D'Agata. It was filmed in Tunis, Rome and Florence.

== Cast ==
- Ugo Tognazzi: Colonel Leone
- Mariangela Melato: Lola
- Franco Fabrizi: Captain Beltrani
- Mario Scaccia: General Pigna
- Stefano Satta Flores: Official
- Checco Rissone: General Cicciolo
- Gian Carlo Fusco: General Pasta
- Daniele Vargas: Lt. Poli
- Georges Wilson: General
- Eros Pagni: Italian Official in Greece
- Flavio Bucci
