= I fichissimi =

- Italian theatrical release poster
- Directed by: Carlo Vanzina
- Written by: Carlo Vanzina; Enrico Vanzina
- Starring: Jerry Calà; Diego Abatantuono
- Cinematography: Alessandro D'Eva
- Edited by: Raimondo Crociani
- Music by: Detto Mariano
- Release date: 1981
- Running time: 90 minutes
- Country: Italy
- Language: Italian

I fichissimi (Italian for "The really cool guys", also known as Guys and Dolls in the Suburbs) is a 1981 Italian comedy film directed by Carlo Vanzina. The film consists in a story of rival punks in Milan and it is loosely based on the William Shakespeare's tragedy Romeo and Juliet.

== Plot ==
Milan, early 1980s. The Milanese Romeo and the Apulian Felice lead two rival gangs. Romeo falls in love with Giulietta without knowing she is the sister of Felice.

== Cast ==
- Jerry Calà as Romeo
- Diego Abatantuono as Felice
- Simona Mariani as Giulietta
- Mauro Di Francesco as Renato
- Carmine Faraco as Felice's Brother
- Ugo Bologna as Lawyer Colombo

== See also ==
- List of Italian films of 1981
