= Francesco Massaro =

Italian director and screenwriter (1935–2026)

Francesco Massaro (23 August 1935 – 20 July 2026) was an Italian director and screenwriter.

== Life and career ==
Born in Padua on 23 August 1935, Massaro started his career as assistant director of Luchino Visconti's The Leopard. In the 1960s, he began to collaborate with eminent directors such as Pietro Germi, Dino Risi and Lucio Fulci. He made his debut as a director in 1972, with the commedia all'italiana Il generale dorme in piedi, then directed a number of comedy films and TV series with good success. Massaro died in Rome on 20 July 2026, at the age of 90.

== Filmography ==
- Il generale dorme in piedi (1972)
- La banca di Monate (1976)
- Il lupo e l'agnello (1980)
- I carabbinieri (1981)
- Miracoloni (1981)
- Al bar dello sport (1983)
- Domani mi sposo (1984)
- Private Affairs (1987)
