= Radio 105 TV =

Italian television channel

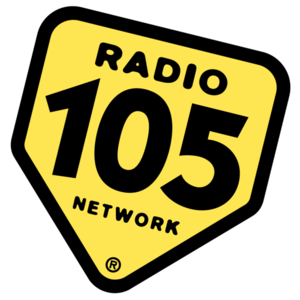
- Country: Italy
- Broadcast area: Italy

Programming
- Language: Italian
- Picture format: HDTV 1080i

Ownership
- Owner: Mediaset
- Parent: RadioMediaset
- Sister channels: R101 TV; Virgin Radio TV; Radio Monte Carlo TV

History
- Launched: 2011; 15 years ago

Links
- Webcast: Mediaset Infinity
- Website: 105.net

Availability

Terrestrial
- Digital terrestrial television: Channel 566

Radio 105 TV is an Italian free-to-air television channel that mainly broadcasts the namesake radio network's shows in simulcast radio-TV.

It is available on channel 66 of digital terrestrial television and on streaming on his website and Mediaset Infinity.

== History ==
The channel was launched along with Radio Monte Carlo TV in 2011 by SingSingMusic on streaming on the website until 23 December 2019, when it started broadcast on Channel 157 replacing Virgin Radio TV.

Until 29 March 2020, the channel exclusively broadcast music videos on a rotating basis.

Since 30 March 2020, 105 Take Away, the channel's first show, is on air, broadcast on simulcast radio-TV from Mondays to Fridays from 12 AM to 1 PM.

Since 22 June 2020, 105 Mi Casa, the channel's second show, is on air, from Mondays to Fridays from 8 PM to 9 PM.

Since September 2021, Tutto Esaurito, the channel's third show, is on air, from Mondays to Fridays from 7 AM to 10 AM, broadcast in simulcast with the affiliated network; this show aired with only the live's audio and the show's graphics until September; today it airs with cameras in studios like all the shows broadcast on the channel.

From 4 October 2021 to 2023, 105 Kaos, the channel's fourth show, is on air, from Mondays to Fridays from 6 PM to 8 PM.

Since 25 October 2021, Lo Zoo di 105 in best of version is on air, from 11 PM to midnight. This show is not in radio-TV simulcast, because his radio broadcasts from Mondays to Fridays from 10 PM to midnight (9 PM to 11 PM today) 105 Night Express.

On 17 January 2022, the channel moved on channel 66.

Since 1 March 2022, 13 pm, the channel's fifth show, is on air, from Mondays to Fridays from 1 PM to 2 PM.

Since 15 March 2022, 105 Friends, the channel's sixth show, is on air, from Mondays to Fridays from 10 AM to 12 PM.

Since 21 March 2022, 105 Music & Cars, the channel's seventh show, is on air, from Mondays to Fridays, from 4 PM to 6 PM.

Since 23 April 2022, Tutto bene a 105, the channel's eight show, is on air, from Mondays to Fridays, and also the weekend's first show
