= S.P.Q.R.: 2,000 and a Half Years Ago =

- Italian: S.P.Q.R. - 2000 e mezzo anni fa
- Directed by: Carlo Vanzina
- Written by: Enrico Vanzina; Carlo Vanzina
- Produced by: Aurelio De Laurentiis
- Starring: Christian De Sica; Massimo Boldi; Leslie Nielsen; Nadia Rinaldi; Anna Falchi; Gabriella Labate; Cash
- Cinematography: Gianlorenzo Battaglia
- Edited by: Sergio Montanari
- Music by: Federico De Robertis
- Distributed by: Filmauro
- Release date: December 16, 1994
- Running time: 100 min
- Country: Italy
- Language: Italian/English
- Box office: $15 million

S.P.Q.R.: 2,000 and a Half Years Ago (Italian: S.P.Q.R. - 2000 e ½ anni fa) is a 1994 Italian comedy film directed by Carlo Vanzina and starring Christian De Sica, Massimo Boldi and Leslie Nielsen.

== Plot ==
Rome, 71 BC. The corrupt senator Cesare Atticus is on holiday at the seaside with his lover Ottavia, secretly from his wife Cornelia. He is summoned back to Rome by the leader of his party, Senator Lucio Cinico. Along the way on the Appian Way, Atticus collides with the carriage of the magistrate Antonio Servilio, who has just moved to Rome from Mediolanum, and they have a heated argument. Shortly after, Servilio discovers that the apartment he has rented, even under the table, is owned by Atticus himself. The two clash again a few days later in the stands of the Colosseum during the Republic Cup match between Roma and Mediolanum, a circumstance that increases the hatred between them.

Meanwhile, tired of Ottavia's demands, Atticus dismisses his lover and replaces her with the Egyptian model Iside, to whom he also gives the house previously occupied by Ottavia. In retaliation, Ottavia tells Servilio about some illegal activities of Atticus that could get him into trouble. Servilio shows up at Atticus' house with a warrant, putting him against the wall. Atticus tries in every way, but unsuccessfully, to bribe the judge, even resorting to using the fact that something is developing between their children (who are classmates). Servilio does not back down and also forbids his daughter Claudia from seeing Atticus' son Alessio ever again.

To avoid jail time, Atticus turns to Senator Cinico, who advises him to discredit Servilio. Thus, after reaching an agreement with a brothel owner, he hires the prostitute Poppea to seduce Servilio. Servilio accepts the dinner invitation at Poppea's house, believing her to be a noble widow, unaware that he is actually entering a brothel where he is caught red-handed by Atticus and the Procurator. After apologizing to Atticus, the Procurator sends Servilio to the island of Filicudi, in Sicily.

Confined in Sicily, Servilio seems to have lost all ambition, until one day he unexpectedly witnesses a dispute between a family of farmers and some mafiosi over the collection of tributes. Despite initial omertà, Servilio discovers that Don Varrone, the local governor of the island, is behind the mafia attack. Servilio obtains Varrone's confession, pointing to Atticus as connected to the criminal activity in the town. This allows Servilio to return to Rome with new and stronger accusations against his enemy.

Cinico advises Atticus on a definitive solution: assassinating his accuser. Reluctantly, Atticus agrees when Iside shows him some asps from her homeland. Atticus secretly brings the asps to the judge's office, but changes his mind when his son Alessio unexpectedly enters the office, sabotaging the plan. Servilio aims to frame the true mastermind behind everything, Senator Cinico, and the two ally for this purpose. Posing as female cooks under the false names Lella and Nella, they enter Cinico's house and seize the ledger where he keeps his off-the-books accounting, successfully bringing it to the Procurator after a chariot chase.

During the trial, where Atticus confesses everything, Servilio requests acquittal for Atticus on the condition that he returns what he has embezzled from the State and demands a conviction for Cinico. However, thanks to a compelling defense, Cinico convinces the jurors that his crimes have served the general welfare of the Roman citizens, resulting in Cesare and Antonio being sentenced to hard labor. They end up taking part in the Spartacus revolt, being defeated and crucified on the Appian Way, where they first clashed. On the cross, Antonio hopes for a future world without corruption. The scene shifts to Rome 2000 years later, where at the same spot, their descendants repeat the clash and the argument.

== Cast ==
- Christian De Sica as Cesare Atticus
- Massimo Boldi as Antonio Servilio
- Leslie Nielsen as Lucio Cinico
- Nadia Rinaldi as Cornelia
- Anna Falchi as Poppea
- Gabriella Labate as Ottavia
- Cash Casia as Iside
- Marco Vivio as Alessio
- Isabella Rocchietta as Claudia
- Marina Tagliaferri as Livia
- Francesco De Rosa as Publio
- Ugo Conti as Silvio Zebio
- Virginie Marsan as Flavietta
- Rossana Di Lorenzo as Rosa
- Nicolina Verrelli Papetti as Augusta
- Cesare Gelli as the Procurator
- Carlos Valles as Monsieur Claude
- Renato Moretti as the old Senator
- Riccardo Rossi as Lucio Sola
- Mario Donatone as the Princeps Senatus
- Mauro Marino as the centurion at the bank
- Luigi Burruano as Governor Varrone
- Fabio Grossi as Valerio
- Gastone Pescucci as Aurispex
- Massimo Ceccherini as the Tuscan guy
- Mario De Martino as Faxus
- Salvatore Emilio as Gennarinus
- Giovanna Elefante as Appia
- Stefano Antonucci as the pharmacist
- Otello Belardi as the director of the bank
- Isabella Celani as a slave at the garçonniere
- Susanna D'Amico as the boor slave
- Giuseppe Oppedisano as Leoluca
- Domenico Minutoli as Leoluca's father
- Aline Pilato as Leoluca's mother
- Yoon C. Joyce as Atticus' slave
- Bruno Gialli as Cinico's first Praetorian Guard
- Marco Marzocca as Cinico's second Praetorian Guard
- Stefano Pizzichelli as Conan
- Turi Scalia as the postman at Filicudi
- Roberto Proietti as Tullio
