= Ugo Conti =

Italian actor (born 1955)

- Born: 30 March 1955 (age 71); Milan, Italy
- Occupation: Actor
- Years active: 1982–present
- Height: 1.70 m (5 ft 7 in)

Ugo Conti (born 30 March 1955) is an Italian actor. He has appeared in more than fifty films since 1982.

== Selected filmography ==
Year	Title	Role	Notes
2010	Happy Family		
2007	2061: An Exceptional Year		
2002	Amnèsia		
1997	Nirvana		
1997	Physical Jerks		
1997	The Best Man		
1994	S.P.Q.R.: 2,000 and a Half Years Ago		
1994	The Bull		
1993	The Escort		
1993	For Love, Only for Love		
1991	Mediterraneo		
1990	On Tour		
1990	Vacanze di Natale '90		
1989	Marrakech Express		
1987	Soldati – 365 all'alba		
1982	Eccezzziunale... veramente		
