= Jerry Calà =

Italian film actor

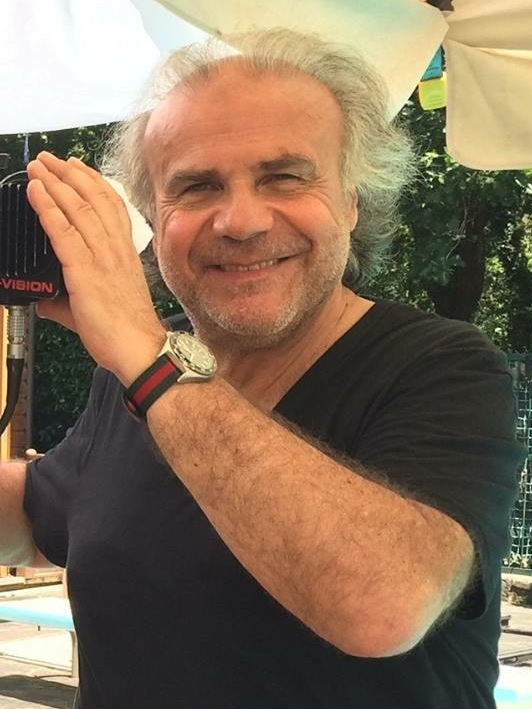
- Born: Calogero Calà; 28 June 1951 (age 75); Catania, Italy
- Occupations: actor, film director
- Spouses: Mara Venier (m. 1984; div. 1987) Elisabetta Castioni (m. 2002)
- Children: 1

Calogero Alessandro Augusto Calà, known by his stage name Jerry Calà (born 28 June 1951), is an Italian actor, filmmaker, comedian and singer who has written, directed, and acted in multiple film and television projects. He is considered one of the most popular Italian comedians of the eighties and nineties in his country.

== Background ==
Calà was born Calogero Calà in Catania, and as a child he moved first to Milan and then to Verona. He married the Italian showgirl Mara Venier in 1984, but divorced three years later. He remarried in 2002 with the businesswoman Elisabetta Castioni and in 2003, his son Johnny was born. He considers himself Roman Catholic.

=== Career ===
In the early 1970s Calà co-founded together with Umberto Smaila, Franco Oppini and Ninì Salerno a cabaret-ensemble, "I Gatti di Vicolo Miracoli". In the early 80s, after two films with the group, he started a solo career as a leading actor in numerous comedy films, obtaining great popularity in Italy. In 1993, he starred in the dramatic movie Diary of a Maniac, directed by Marco Ferreri which was entered into the 43rd Berlin International Film Festival, where Calà won the award for best actor by the Italian film critics. He debuted as director in 1994 with Chicken Park, a low-budget parody of Jurassic Park.

== Filmography ==
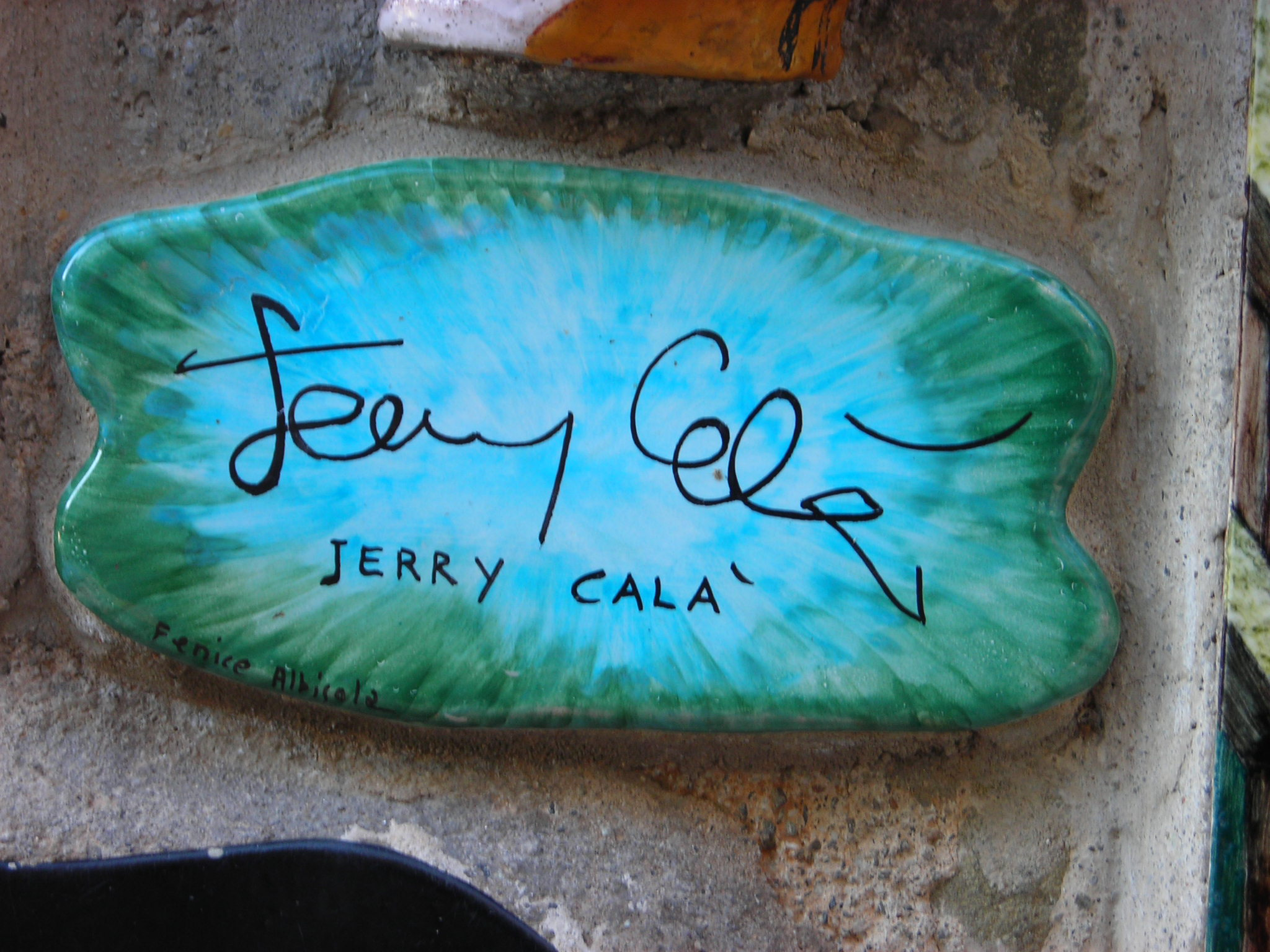
Jerry Calà's signature

=== As director ===
- Chicken Park (1994)
- Ragazzi della notte (1995)
- Gli inaffidabili (1997)
- Vita Smeralda (2006)
- Torno a vivere da solo (2008)
- Pipi Room (2011) – TV film
- Odissea nell'ospizio (2019)
- Chi ha rapito Jerry Calà? (2023)

=== As actor ===
- Arrivano i gatti (1980)
- Una vacanza bestiale (1980)
- I fichissimi (1981)
- Bomber (1982)
- I'm Going to Live by Myself (1982)
- Al bar dello sport (1983)
- Time for Loving (1983)
- Vacanze di Natale (1983), also singer
- A Boy and a Girl (1984)
- Vacanze in America (1984)
- Domani mi sposo (1984)
- Love at First Sight (1985)
- Yesterday - Vacanze al mare (1985) – TV show
- Yuppies (1986)
- Il ragazzo del Pony Express (1986)
- Yuppies 2 (1986)
- Professione vacanze (1987) – TV show
- Rimini Rimini (1987)
- Sottozero (1987)
- Sposi (1988)
- Delitti e profumi (1988)
- Fratelli d'Italia (1989)
- Occhio alla perestrojka (1990)
- Abbronzatissimi (1991)
- Saint Tropez - Saint Tropez (1992)
- Diary of a Maniac (1993)
- Abbronzatissimi 2 (1993)
- Chicken Park (1994)
- Ragazzi della notte (1995)
- Gli inaffidabili (1997)
- Non chiamatemi papà (1997) – TV film
- Death Run (1999) – TV film
- Anni '60 (1999)
- Vita Smeralda (2006)
- Torno a vivere da solo (2008)
- Happily N'Ever After 2 (2009), Italian voice of the Magic Mirror
- Operazione vacanze (2012)
- E io non pago (2012)
- Odissea nell'ospizio (2019)
- Chi ha rapito Jerry Calà? (2023)
