= I Gatti di Vicolo Miracoli =

Italian comedy and musical act (1971–1985)

I Gatti di Vicolo Miracoli (lit. 'The Cats of Miracles Alley') was an Italian comedy and musical act. Formed in 1971, it originally consisted of Jerry Calà, Umberto Smaila, Nini Salerno, Gianandrea Gazzola and Spray Mallory. Gazzola and Mallory left the group in 1975, and were replaced by Franco Oppini. A trio since Calà's exit in 1981, the group disbanded in 1985.

== History of the group ==
The group, consisting of some schoolmates, formed in Verona in 1971 as a split from the 24 members ensamble "Studio 24", and the same year they started successfully performing at the Derby Club in Milan, in some satirical and musical shows directed by mime and Dario Fo's frequent collaborator Arturo Corso. In 1972, they released their first eponymous album. In 1975, Gazzola and Mallory left the group, and were replaced by Franco Oppini, who had already been an affiliate of the group in 1971; with this new line-up, the ensemble started to participate regularly in RAI variety shows, increasing their popularity. A major boost to their success came from their participation in 1977–8 in the Rai 1 show Non Stop, which launched the career of numerous comedians, notably Massimo Troisi, Carlo Verdone and Francesco Nuti.

In 1979, the group had a major hit with the song "Capito?", which reached the fourth place on the Italian hit parade. They then starred in two comedy films directed by Carlo Vanzina, the semi-autobiographical Arrivano i gatti and Una vacanza bestiale, both released in 1980. Following the commercial success of his solo performance in I fichissimi, in 1981 Calà left the group, and became one of the leading stars of the Italian film scene at the time. The group continued to perform as a trio for a few years, mainly working for Silvio Berlusconi's Fininvest, before splitting in 1985. Starting from Cala's 1997 film Gli inaffidabili, they occasionally reunited in the following years in films, on television and on stage.
