= Umberto Smaila =

Italian actor and composer (born 1950)

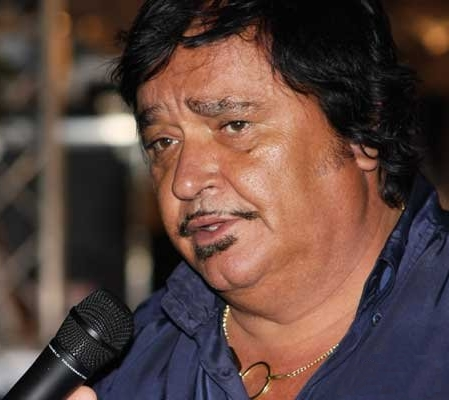
- Umberto Smaila in 2008
- Born: Umberto Smaila; June 26, 1950 (age 75); Verona, Italy
- Occupations: Actor, singer
- Height: 1.79 m (5 ft 10 in)

Umberto Smaila (born 26 June 1950) is an Italian actor, composer, comedian, television personality, entrepreneur, and musician.

== Career ==
Born in Verona to an Istrian family, in the early-1970s Smaila co-founded together with Jerry Calà, Franco Oppini and Ninì Salerno a comedy ensemble, I Gatti di Vicolo Miracoli. The group, reduced to three components since 1982 following Calà's departure, appeared on several successful TV programs and films and released several songs, including the hit singles "Verona Beat" and "Singer Solitude". After the disbandment of the group Smaila was the television presenter of a number of quiz and variety shows, most notably the late night show Colpo Grosso. In the 1990s, he founded the "U.S. Band", an orchestra with whom he performed in several television programs.

Smaila wrote and directed a musical comedy film, Italian Boys, released in 1982. In 1990, he put on a theatre production on the life and music of Fred Buscaglione. Smaila also composed musical scores for a number of films including Beast with a Gun (1977), Il ragazzo del pony express (1986), Sweets from a Stranger (1987), Delitti e profumi (1988), and Chicken Park (1994). The main theme of Beast with a Gun was later included in the soundtrack of Quentin Tarantino's Jackie Brown.

== Personal life ==
Smaila is the founder of the brand Smaila's, a chain of restaurants and nightclubs specialized in live music. He is agnostic.
