= Carlo Vanzina =

Italian film director, producer and screenwriter (1951–2018)

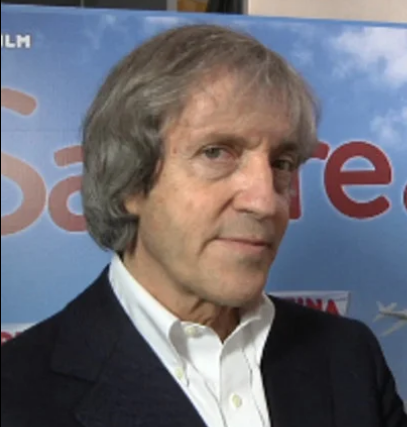
- Vanzina in 2014
- Born: 13 March 1951; Rome, Italy
- Died: 8 July 2018 (aged 67); Rome, Italy
- Occupations: Film director; screenwriter
- Years active: 1976–2018
- Height: 1.70 m (5 ft 7 in)
- Relatives: Steno (father); Enrico Vanzina (brother)

Carlo Vanzina (13 March 1951 – 8 July 2018) was an Italian film director, producer and screenwriter.

Vanzina was born in Rome, the son of Maria Teresa Nati and film director Stefano Vanzina and brother of Enrico Vanzina.

Many of his projects were made for Italian television with English-speaking actors, and in turn these films received English-language home video releases in America. He frequently worked with models-turned-actresses such as Renee Simonsen, Carole Bouquet, Carol Alt, Lauren Hutton, and Elle Macpherson.

Two of his films, Eccezzziunale... veramente (1982) and Vacanze di Natale (1983), were shown as part of a retrospective on Italian comedy at the 67th Venice International Film Festival.

== Filmography ==
- Luna di miele in tre (1976)
- Figlio delle stelle (1979)
- Arrivano i gatti (1980)
- Una vacanza bestiale (1980)
- I fichissimi (1981)
- Viuuulentemente mia (1982)
- Eccezzziunale... veramente (1982)
- Time for Loving (1982)
- Dagger Eyes (1983)
- Il ras del quartiere (1983)
- Vacanze di Natale (1983)
- Amarsi un po' (1984)
- Vacanze in America (1984)
- Nothing Underneath (1985)
- Yuppies (1986)
- Monte Napoleone (1986)
- My First Forty Years (1987)
- Montecarlo Gran Casinò (1987)
- The Gamble (1988)
- Le finte bionde (1989)
- Tre colonne in cronaca (1990)
- Millions (1991)
- Piedipiatti (1991)
- Sognando la California (1992)
- Pretty Princess (1993)
- The Heroes (1994)
- S.P.Q.R.: 2,000 and a Half Years Ago (1994)
- I Don't Speak English (1995)
- Selvaggi (1995)
- Squillo (1996)
- A spasso nel tempo (1996)
- Banzai (1997)
- A spasso nel tempo – L'avventura continua (1997)
- Il cielo in una stanza (1999)
- Vacanze di Natale 2000 (1999)
- What Girls Never Say (2000)
- E adesso sesso (2001)
- South Kensington (2001)
- Febbre da cavallo - La mandrakata (2002)
- Il pranzo della domenica (2003)
- The Jokes (2004)
- In questo mondo di ladri (2004)
- Il ritorno del Monnezza (2005)
- Really SSSupercool: Chapter Two (2006)
- Olé (2006)
- 2061: An Exceptional Year (2007)
- Un'estate al mare (2008)
- Un'estate ai Caraibi (2009)
- La vita è una cosa meravigliosa (2010)
- Ti presento un amico (2010)
- The Last Fashion Show (2011)
- Ex 2: Still Friends? (2011)
- Buona giornata (2012)
- Us in the U.S. (2013)
- Sapore di te (2014)
- A Fairy-Tale Wedding (2014)
- Torno indietro e cambio vita (2015)
- Miami Beach (2016)
- Non si ruba a casa dei ladri (2016)
- Caccia al tesoro (2017)
