= Semino =

Semino is both an Italian surname and a given name. Notable people with this name include:

- Camilla Semino Favro (born 1986), Italian actress
- Carlos Semino (1929-2014), Argentine rower
- Elena Semino (born 1964), Italian-British linguist
- Gustavo Semino (born 1977), Argentine footballer
- Semino Rossi (born 1962), Argentine-Tyrolean schlager singer
