= War metaphors in cancer =

Figures of speech for people's experiences with cancer

War metaphors are often used to describe a person's experience with cancer. Those who have died are said to have lost their "battle with cancer", while the living are described as "fighting cancer".

While the use of metaphors can help physicians explain cancer in a way that is understood by patients, it has been argued that words such as battle and fight are inappropriate, as they suggest that cancer can be defeated if one just fights hard enough.

== History ==
The use of war and battle metaphors in medicine has been documented back to the 1600s. Over the 20th century, politicians have "declared war" on cancer, diabetes, AIDS, and obesity.

Military metaphors are not an exclusively Western phenomenon. Battle terms are also used in traditional Chinese medicine. Contrarily, in sub-Saharan Africa, diseases are seen as a part of life that should be accepted, not fought.

== Usage ==
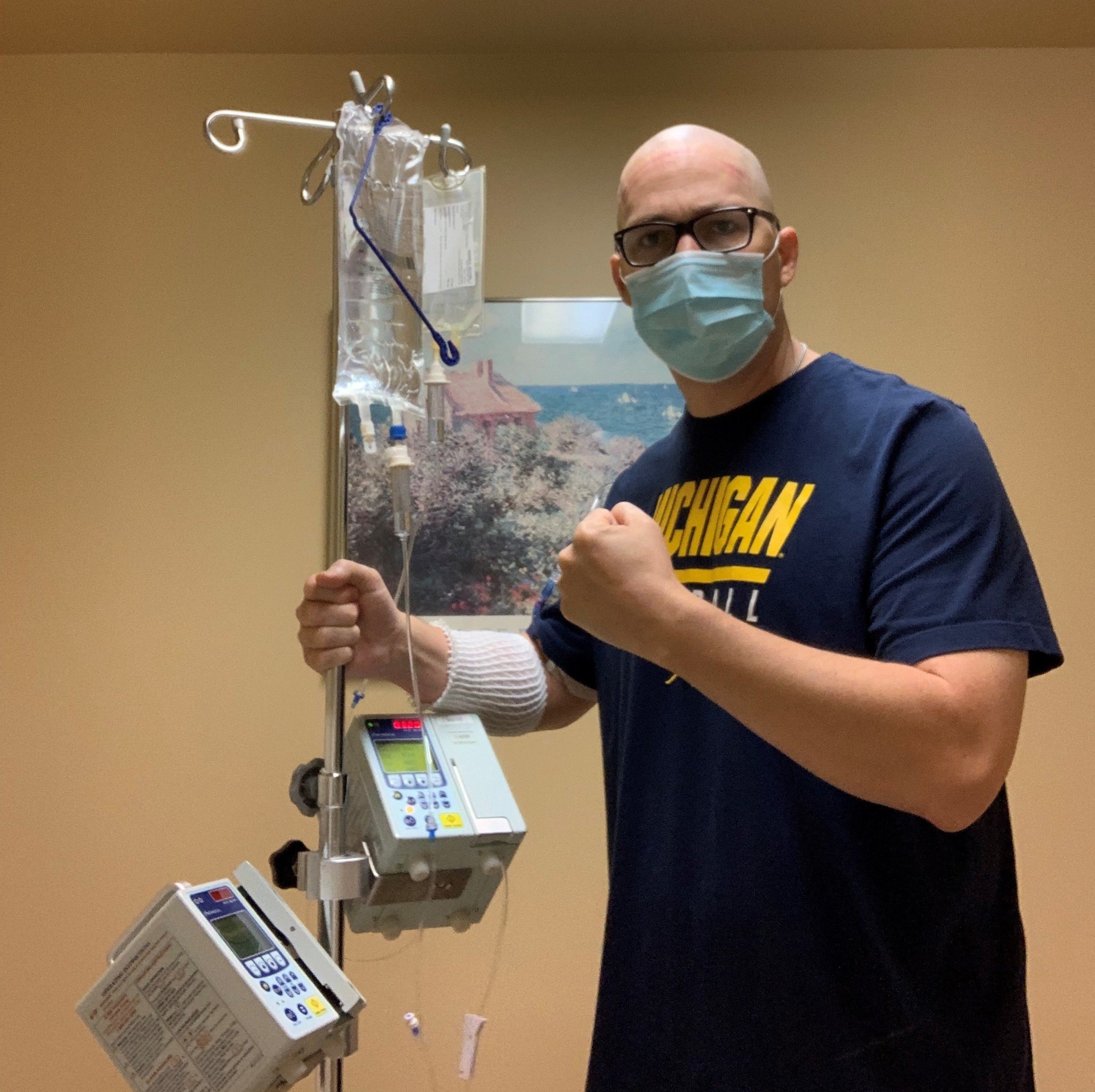
Some people perceive cancer treatment as a battle to be fought.

War metaphors are commonly used by scientists, physicians, patients, and the general public.

A 2010 study found that greater use of metaphors by physicians was associated with better understanding by patients.

The phrase is often used when someone dies, and may appear in obituaries. For example, a statement from Victoria Wood's publicist in April 2016 said that Wood had "passed away, after a short but brave battle with cancer". In December 2016, journalist A. A. Gill was described by Sky News as having died after a "short fight with cancer".

Research in 2014 led by Elena Semino, a professor of linguistics at Lancaster University, alongside palliative care specialists, based on 1.5 million words of discussion, led Semino to say, "We have enough evidence to suggest that battle metaphors are sufficiently negative for enough people that they shouldn't be imposed on anyone". The study stated that doctors should avoid battle/fight metaphors unless patients themselves chose to use them, and obituaries should avoid them, especially the idea of "losing" such a battle/fight. By comparison, another common metaphor, comparing cancer to a "journey" was "less likely to lead to feelings of guilt or failure". In a study conducted in 2003 stated that patients using war-related terminology to describe their breast cancer had higher rates of depression and "poorer quality of life".

In a 2014 article in The Guardian titled "Having cancer is not a fight or a battle", physician Kate Granger, who was diagnosed with desmoplastic small-round-cell tumor (a type of sarcoma), explains how the use of military language, whilst perhaps aiming to instill a sense of positivity, can have the opposite effect.

=== Criticism ===
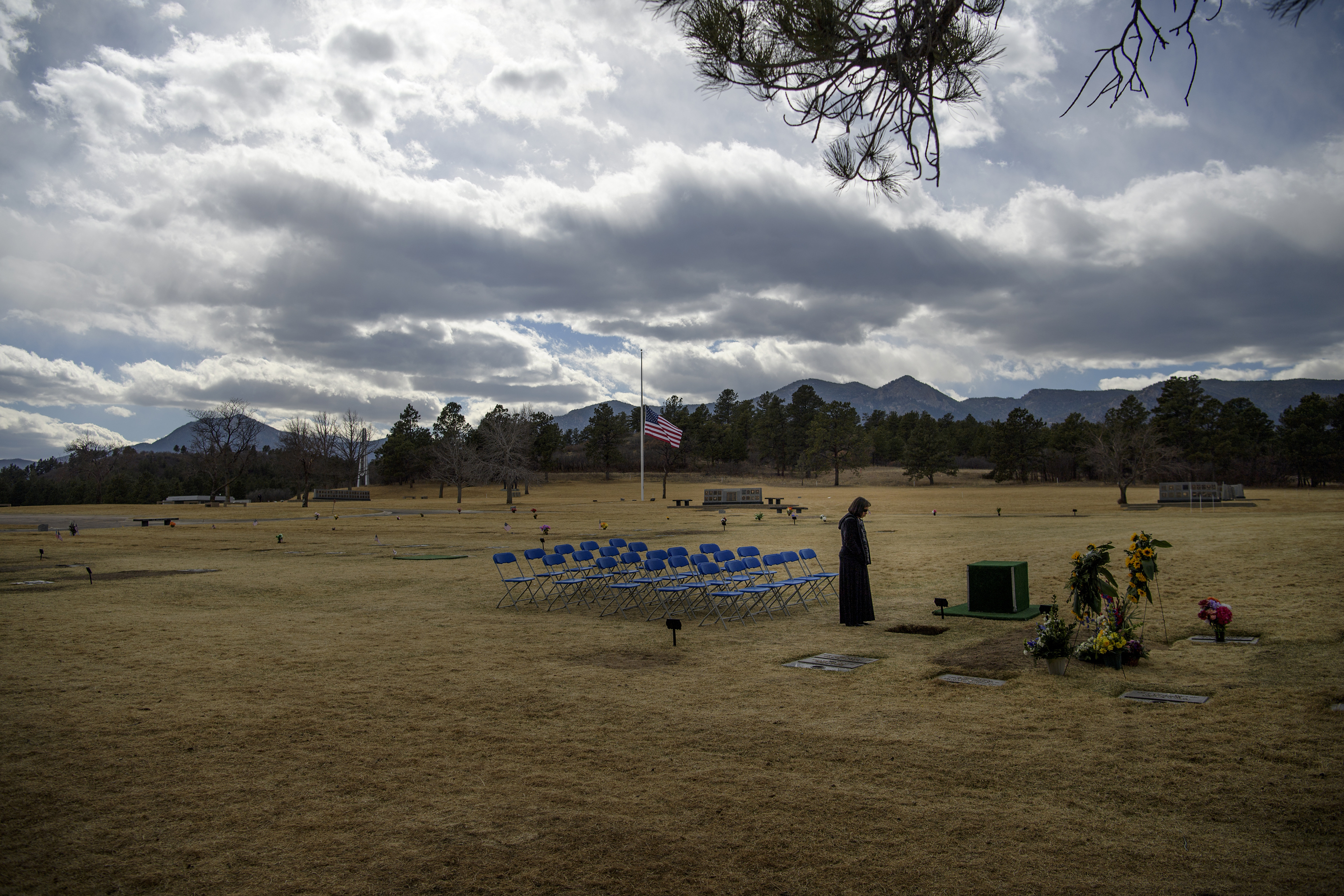
Talking about "losing" a battle with cancer can feel hurtful and critical.

The use of war metaphors can have negative effects for patients. Patients perceive treatment to be more difficult when it is described to them using violent metaphors. These metaphors can also lead to feelings of disempowerment, guilt, and fatalism. One study found that the use of war metaphors in cancer public health decreased engagement in cancer prevention behaviors. Another common criticism of this use of metaphor is that when patients die, the implication is that they did not fight enough, and if they fought harder, they would have been victorious. The term "journey with cancer" has been proposed to replace the war metaphors due to both help with the visualization of the disease and more gentleness for patients.

Sick Kids Hospital in Canada spent $2 million on an advertising campaign depicting children as warriors clad in armor with weapons. This attracted controversy and was decried by some as not portraying the true experience of children with serious diseases. A charity has been named Cyclists Fighting Cancer and foods have been described as "cancer-fighting". Following the death of Robin Gibb, cancer survivor Jenni Murray criticized the media for using 'pugilistic terminology' arguing 'RIP Robin Gibb with an acknowledgement that he drew the short straw of a difficult disease'.

== Determinants of identity adoption ==
Research has indicated that the likelihood of adopting a specific label varies according to different factors. A study of men post-prostatectomy showed that men were most likely to adopt the label of 'someone who has had cancer'. The label 'cancer survivor' was more likely when there was higher cancer severity perception and when there was benefit found in the 'survivor' identity. Those identifying with 'victim' were more likely to receive a positive depression result on a depression screening. Other work suggests that older age and enhanced psychological development following diagnosis are linked with the likelihood of adopting a 'survivor' identity. When examined by gender, men who identified as 'survivors' had lower perceptions of threat, engaged in greater reflection, and had stronger insight about their cancer experience from peer communication. Women who identified as 'survivors' were more engaged in posting to online support groups, felt a greater sense of belonging in peer contexts, and were able to better relate to those in support groups compared with women who did not adopt the 'survivor' identity.

On the other hand, a study of bone marrow transplant receivers who previously had cancer found that patient identity was not related to age nor income. It was also found to be inversely correlated to education and the amount of time that had passed since the transplant. It is also shown to be unrelated to how well or poorly adjusted psychologically a person is following their cancer treatment. In a study of colorectal survivors, researchers found that adopting a 'survivor' identity was not significantly related to age, status of relationship, level of schooling, or duration since cancer diagnosis.

== Other illnesses and conditions ==
The concept of a "battle with..." is used in similar phrases such as a "battle with depression".

HIV researchers also commonly use battle metaphors. Some commentators have criticized the use of war terms and militarization of the HIV/AIDS pandemic.

== See also ==
- Euphemism
- "Illness as Metaphor," an essay by Susan Sontag criticizing this type of language
- War on cancer
- War as metaphor
