= Maurizio Calvesi =

Italian cinematographer

- Born: 1954 (age 71–72); Rome, Italy
- Occupation: Cinematographer
- Years active: 1977–present

Maurizio Calvesi (born 1954) is an Italian cinematographer, whose career spanned over 30 years.

== Life and career ==
Born in Rome, Calvesi began his career in 1977 as a camera operator before debuting as cinematographer in 1990. In 1992 he won a special Ciak d'oro for his work in Aurelio Grimaldi's Acla's Descent into Floristella. In 2003 Calvesi won the Golden Pegasus at the Flaiano Film Festival for his work in Roberto Faenza's The Soul Keeper. He won the Nastro d'Argento for best cinematography twice, in 2007 for Roberto Andò's Secret Journey and in 2010 for Ferzan Özpetek's Loose Cannons. He also won two Globi d'oro (Italian Golden Globes), in 2007 for Mohsen Melliti's I, the Other and in 2008 for Faenza's I Vicerè.

== Selected filmography ==
- Volevo i pantaloni (1990)
- Acla's Descent into Floristella (1992)
- Vietato ai minori (1992)
- The Rebel (1993)
- The Whores (1994)
- OcchioPinocchio (1994)
- A Cold, Cold Winter (1996)
- Nerolio (1996)
- Giovani e belli (1996)
- My Dearest Friends (1998)
- Kaputt Mundi (1998)
- The Scent of the Night (1998)
- Up at the Villa (2000)
- I Love Andrea (2000)
- Ginostra (2002)
- The Soul Keeper (2002)
- Forever (2003)
- Strange Crime (2004)
- Shadows in the Sun (2005)
- The Days of Abandonment (2005)
- Secret Journey (2006)
- I, the Other (2006)
- I Vicerè (2007)
- The Case of Unfaithful Klara (2009)
- All at Sea (2011)
- Someday This Pain Will Be Useful to You (2011)
- Magnificent Presence (2012)
- Cherry on the Cake (2012)
- Long Live Freedom (2013)
- Amiche da morire (2013)
- People Who Are Well (2014)
- Don't Be Bad (2015)
- I Killed Napoléon (2015)
- The Confessions (2016)
- It's All About Karma (2017)
- The Stolen Caravaggio (2018)
- The Hidden Child (2021)
- Never Too Late for Love (2022)
- Strangeness (2022)
- The Illusion (2025)
- God Laughs (2026)
