= Long Live Freedom =

- Directed by: Roberto Andò
- Written by: Roberto Andò; Angelo Pasquini
- Produced by: Angelo Barbagallo; Gaetano Daniele
- Starring: Toni Servillo; Valerio Mastandrea; Valeria Bruni Tedeschi; Michela Cescon; Anna Bonaiuto; Gianrico Tedeschi; Eric Nguyen; Andrea Renzi; Judith Davis; Brice Fournier; Paolo Bessegato; Giulia Andò; Alessandro Averone; Vincenzo Pirrotta; Giovanni Lombardo Radice; Antonio Gerardi; Lucia Mascino; Saskia Vester; Stella Kent; Massimo De Francovich; Renato Scarpa
- Cinematography: Maurizio Calvesi
- Music by: Marco Betta
- Release date: 14 February 2013
- Running time: 94 minutes
- Country: Italy
- Language: Italian
- Box office: $48,541 (US)

Long Live Freedom (Italian: Viva la libertà) is a 2013 Italian comedy-drama film directed by Roberto Andò. It won the Nastro d'Argento for Best Screenplay and the David di Donatello for Best Script and the David di Donatello for Best Supporting Actor to Valerio Mastandrea.

== Plot ==
Enrico Oliveri is a shrewd, experienced politician, a senator and party leader of the center-left whose career is in decline. His party is currently in opposition and by all projections is headed for another defeat in the upcoming elections. Members of his party want to dump him. Suffering depression and exhaustion, he decides to disappear for a while, hiding incognito in Paris, France at the home of a former lover, Danielle, who is now married to a famous film director by whom she has a school-age daughter.

Panic ensues among Oliveri's political intimates when they discover his disappearance. His right-hand man, Andrea Bottini, does not lose faith, but instead gets the idea of secretly substituting Oliveri's twin brother, Giovanni Ernani, an over-the-top writer and philosopher who has previously spent time in mental health care and is still medicated. Complications ensue, but the substitute proves more outgoing, more visionary, and much more popular with the press, the public and even with his competitors than his more serious brother, and he leads the party towards victory. The real senator rediscovers himself while watching his brother's success from afar through the French newspapers as he himself dallies in the arms of lovers. Enrico Oliveri eventually returns to Rome, but the film ends in ambiguity.

== Context ==
The backdrop of the film is the depiction of a despair bordering on self-loathing of much of the Italian electorate at Italian economic conditions and the austerity regimen imposed by the European Union. A "Chancellor" obviously intended to be Angela Merkel appears in the film without being named. While some have found the film somewhat lightweight, an extended quotation from Berthold Brecht placed in the mouth of the mad brother reveals the director's intent: when politicians and political institutions fail, only the spirit and individual efforts of the people can rescue a nation from crisis.

== Cast ==
- Toni Servillo: Enrico Oliveri/Giovanni Ernani
- Valerio Mastandrea: Andrea Bottini
- Valeria Bruni Tedeschi: Danielle
- Michela Cescon: Anna
- Anna Bonaiuto: Evelina Pileggi
- Eric Nguyen: Mung
- Judith Davis: Mara
- Andrea Renzi: De Bellis
- Massimo De Francovich: President of Republic
- Renato Scarpa: Arrighi
- Gianrico Tedeschi: Furlan

== Production and distribution ==
The movie was produced by BiBi Film and Rai Cinema. The post-production was carried out by Reset VFX S.r.l.. The distribution of the movie is by 01 Distribution.

== Reception ==
Long Live Freedom has an approval rating of 44% on review aggregator website Rotten Tomatoes, based on 16 reviews, and an average rating of 5.8/10. Metacritic assigned the film a weighted average score of 42 out of 100, based on 6 critics, indicating "mixed or average reviews".
