= Lucia Mascino =

Italian actress

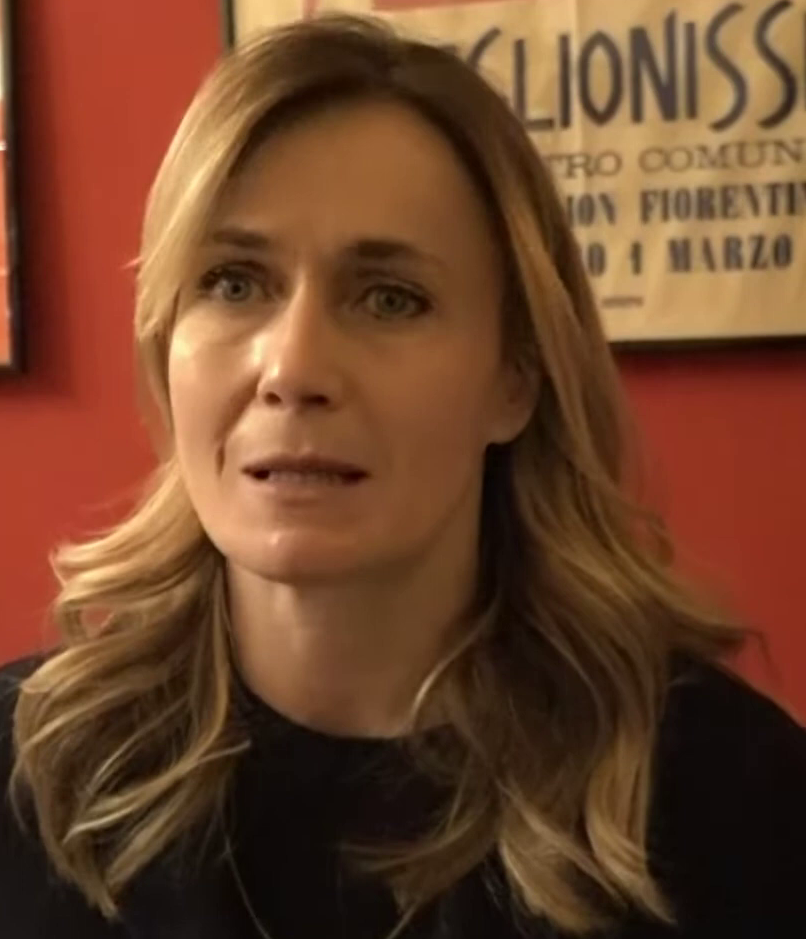
- Mascino in 2022
- Born: 27 January 1977 (age 49); Ancona, Italy
- Occupation: Actress
- Years active: 1999–present

Lucia Mascino (born 27 January 1977) is an Italian actress.

== Career ==
Lucia Mascino, in parallel with her university studies at the Faculty of Mathematical, Physical and Natural Sciences, obtains an acting major at the Theater Research and Experimentation Center of Pontedera, after which, she leaves the university to continue only her acting career. She immediately begins working with the Teatro Settimo in Turin and soon after she joins the Compagnia Giovani of the Teatro Stabile delle Marche with Massimo Navone and Giampiero Solari. In 1999 and 2000 she starred alongside Piera Degli Esposti in the show The Passion of Christ directed by Antonio Calenda. From 2000 to 2005 she was part of the company of Giorgio Barberio Corsetti, staging performances from Kafka, Ovidio and Buchner in Italy and on European tours. In 2001 she was selected to participate in the Écoles des Maîtres higher education school with J.l.Martinelli on Chekhov and she worked again on Chekhov with the Russian director and pedagogue Anton Milenin. In the following years she was directed, among others, by Valerio Binasco and Giancarlo Cobelli. In 2007 she won the ETI New Sensitivity Award with the show she wrote and performed together with Rebecca Murgi, Io sono Internazionale.

Since 2005 she has added to the theatrical experience that in cinema and television. In 2008 she starred in Stefano Tummolini's Un altro pianeta in competition at the Venice Film Festival's Days of Authors and at the Sundance Film Festival. She later collaborated with several Italian directors, including Renato De Maria in The Front Line, Nanni Moretti in We Have a Pope, Giuseppe Piccioni in The Red and the Blue, Roberto Andò in Long Live Freedom, Sabina Guzzanti in The State-Mafia Pact, Alessandro Rossetto in Piccola patria (2013), Marco Segato in La pelle dell'orso (2016), Marco Danieli in Worldly Girl, a film chosen in the Days of the Authors at the Venice Film Festival 2016. She is the female protagonist in the films Fräulein - Una fiaba d'inverno, the first work of Caterina Carone and of Stories of Love That Cannot Belong to This World by Francesca Comencini, a film for which she won the Anna Magnani Award as leading actress at the Bifest of Bari 2018, and was nominated for the Globo d'oro 2018 and the Nastro d'Argento 2018 as best leading actress.

Also in 2018, the film Favola was released by Sebastiano Mauri based on the play of the same name written and directed by Filippo Timi. For her interpretation in the film she receives the nomination for the Nastro d'argento 2019 as Best Actress in a Comedy Film, a category for which she is also nominated with the film La prima pietra by Rolando Ravello. In 2019 she is in the main cast of the film Don't Stop Me Now by Riccardo Milani, in the comedy Parents in Progress by Laura Chiossone, and is among the protagonists of the film I Hate Summer by Massimo Venier, alongside Aldo, Giovanni & Giacomo.

On television she was Chiara Guerrieri, the protagonist of the series Una mamma imperfetta written and directed by Ivan Cotroneo, winner of Nastro d'argento. She also plays the role of Vittoria Fusco, female co-star alongside Filippo Timi, in the series Murders at Barlume, written and directed by Roan Johnson.

In Suburra: Blood on Rome she is Gabriella Santi, a corrupt parliamentarian present both in the first and in the second season directed by Molaioli, Placido, Capotondi, Messina, a series produced by Netflix and Cattleya.

== Filmography ==
=== Film ===
| Year | Title | Role(s) | Notes |
|---|---|---|---|
| 2004 | Tartarughe sul dorso | Co-worker #2 | Cameo appearance |
| 2006 | L'estate del mio primo bacio | Phone Operator | Cameo appearance |
| 2008 | One Day in a Life | Daniela | |
| 2008 | Gloss - Cambiare si può | Alex | |
| 2009 | Different from Whom? | Police Officer | Cameo appearance |
| 2009 | The Front Line | Loredana Biancamano | |
| 2011 | When the Night | Manfred's Mother | |
| 2011 | L'estate che non viene | The Teacher | Short film |
| 2011 | Habemus Papam | Saleswoman | Cameo appearance |
| 2012 | Sulla strada di casa | Police Inspector | Cameo appearance |
| 2012 | Good as You | Francesca | |
| 2012 | The Red and the Blue | Elena Togani | |
| 2013 | L'estate sta finendo | Alessandra | |
| 2013 | Discovery at Dawn | Mother | |
| 2013 | Long Live Freedom | Contestator | Cameo appearance |
| 2013 | Piccola patria | Anna Carniello | |
| 2013 | The Chair of Happiness | Elisa | |
| 2013 | Il Natale della mamma imperfetta | Chiara | |
| 2014 | The State-Mafia Pact | Teology Teacher | Cameo appearance |
| 2014 | What Is Left? | Narrator (voice) | Documentary |
| 2015 | Fraülein: Una fiaba d'inverno | Regina | |
| 2015 | Schiavo d'amore | Donatella | |
| 2016 | Worldly Girl | Professor Donati | |
| 2016 | La pelle dell'orso | Sara | |
| 2016 | Babylon Sisters | Laura | |
| 2017 | Stories of Love That Cannot Belong to This World | Claudia | |
| 2017 | Favola | Mrs. Emerald | |
| 2019 | Don't Stop Me Now | Francesca | |
| 2019 | Io sono Mia | Sandra Neri | |
| 2019 | Parents in Progress | Ilaria Luini | |
| 2019 | Effetto domino | Alessandra Guarnieri | |
| 2020 | I Hate Summer | Barbara | |
| 2020 | In vacanza su Marte | Bea | |
| 2022 | The Wedding Days | Margherita | |
| 2023 | Infinite storie | Mum | Short film |
| 2024 | Una terapia di gruppo | Sonia | |

=== Television ===
| Year | Title | Role(s) | Notes |
|---|---|---|---|
| 2007–2008 | Incantesimo | Loredana Musso | Recurring role; 39 episodes |
| 2011 | Il commissario Manara | Carolina Martini | Episode: "Sotto tiro" |
| 2011 | Don Matteo | Marcella Ravazzi | Episode: "L'ombra del sospetto" |
| 2012 | Kubrick: Una storia porno | Anja | 2 episodes |
| 2012 | Un Natale con i fiocchi | Parking Woman | Television movie |
| 2013 | Una mamma imperfetta | Chiara | Lead role |
| 2013–present | Murders at Barlume | Inspector Vittoria Fusco | Main role |
| 2014 | Non è mai troppo tardi | Mariagrazia Puglisi | Television movie |
| 2014–2015 | Il candidato | Cecilia | 2 episodes |
| 2016 | Braccialetti rossi | Mrs. D'Alessandro | Recurring role; 3 episodes |
| 2017–2019 | Suburra: Blood on Rome | Gabriella | Main role (season 1–2) |
| 2022 | Bang Bang Baby | Gabriella Gianmatteo | Main role |
| 2023 | Vivere non è un gioco da ragazzi | Sonia Galvani | Recurring role; 5 episodes |
| 2024 | Mameli: Il ragazzo che sognò l'Italia | Luisa Ferretti | Main role |
