= Paolo Briguglia =

Italian film, stage and television actor

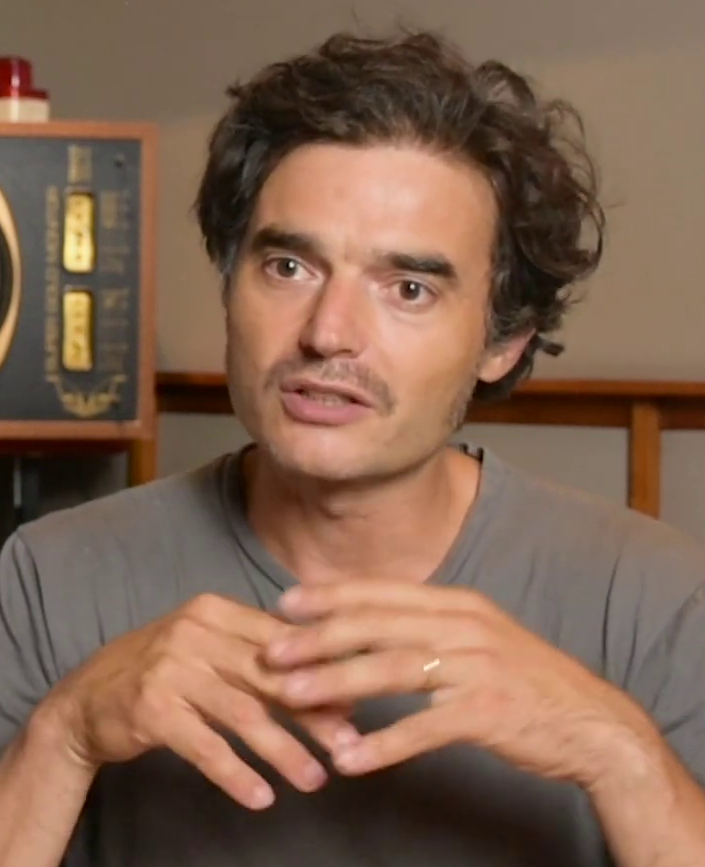
- Born: 27 May 1974 (age 51); Palermo
- Occupation: Actor

Paolo Briguglia (born 27 May 1974) is an Italian film, stage and television actor.

== Life and career ==
Born in Palermo, Sicily, Briguglia studied at the Accademia Nazionale di Arte Drammatica Silvio D'Amico in Rome, graduating in 1998. He made his film debut in 2000, in Roberto Andò's The Prince's Manuscript. His first main role was the soldier Serra in the Enzo Monteleone's 2002 war-drama El Alamein - The Line of Fire, and for this role Briguglia won a Globo d'oro for best new actor.

== Filmography ==
=== Film ===
| Year | Title | Role | Notes |
|---|---|---|---|
| 1999 | The Protagonists | Billy | |
| 2000 | The Prince's Manuscript | Young Marco Pace | |
| 2000 | One Hundred Steps | Giovanni Impastato | |
| 2002 | El Alamein: The Line of Fire | Soldier Serra | |
| 2002 | Paz! | Pentothal's Friend | |
| 2003 | Good Morning, Night | Enzo | |
| 2004 | Stay with Me | Don Marco | |
| 2004 | Movimenti | Paolino | |
| 2005 | But When Do the Girls Get Here? | Gianca Zanichelli | |
| 2006 | Our Land | Mario Di Santo | |
| 2007 | Don't Think About It | Paolo Guidi | |
| 2007 | L'abbuffata | Gabriele | |
| 2009 | The Sicilian Girl | Officer Bruni | |
| 2009 | Baarìa | Catechist | Cameo appearance |
| 2009 | Bets and Wedding Dresses | Giovanni Campanella | |
| 2009 | La cosa giusta | Eugenio Fusco | |
| 2010 | Basilicata Coast to Coast | Salvatore Chiarelli | |
| 2010 | Solo di passaggio | Marco | Short film |
| 2011 | L'amore fa male | Gianmarco | |
| 2011 | Islands | Alessandro | |
| 2012 | Workers | Saro Tartanna | |
| 2015 | Il bambino di vetro | Vincenzo Vetro | |
| 2015 | The Complexity of Happiness | Matteo Borghi | |
| 2015 | Lo scambio | Driver | |
| 2016 | Il figlio sospeso | Lauro Vinciguerra / Arturo Vinciguerra | |
| 2017 | Malarazza | Franco Cutrera | |
| 2021 | Altri padri | Giulio | |
| 2021 | A fior di pelle | Filippo | Short film |
| 2021 | Sulle nuvole | Riccardo | |
| 2022 | Chiara | Brother Leo | |
| 2022 | War – La guerra desiderata | Claudio | |
| 2022 | I racconti della domenica | Father Antonio | |
| 2025 | My Tennis Maestro | Gregorio | |

=== Television ===
| Year | Title | Role | Notes |
|---|---|---|---|
| 2002 | Julius Caesar | Cato the Younger | Two-parts television movie |
| 2002 | St. Francis | Sylvester | Two-parts television movie |
| 2004 | Il tunnel della libertà | Luigi Spina | Television movie |
| 2006 | La buona battaglia – Don Pietro Pappagallo | Mario | Two-parts television movie |
| 2006 | Giovanni Falcone – L'uomo che sfidò Cosa Nostra | Calogero Zucchetto | Two-parts television movie |
| 2007 | Il figlio della luna | Teenage Fulvio Frisone | Television movie |
| 2007 | Era mio fratello | Luca Di Santo / Rosario Musso | Two-parts television movie |
| 2008 | Caravaggio | Mario Minniti | Two-parts television movie |
| 2009 | Non pensarci – La serie | Paolo Guidi | Recurring role, 3 episodes |
| 2010 | Crimini | Fabio Derna | Episode: "Luce del nord" |
| 2014 | Il giudice meschino | Marshall Michele Brighi | Two-parts television movie |
| 2017 | Tutto può succedere | Renato De Cairo | Recurring role, 4 episodes |
| 2018 | Solo | Dr. Caligiuri | Episode: "Seconda puntata" |
| 2018–2020 | Cacciatore: The Hunter | Tony Calvaruso | Main role (season 1) guest (season 2), 14 episodes |
| 2019 | Non mentire | Leo | Main role, 3 episodes |
| 2019 | Oltre la soglia | Alessandro Agosti | Main role, 4 episodes |
| 2021 | Lolita Lobosco | Stefano Morelli | 2 episodes |
| 2023 | The Lions of Sicily | Ignazio Florio | 2 episodes |
| 2024 | I fratelli Corsaro | Roberto Corsaro | Lead role, 4 episodes |
| 2024 | Pale Mountains | Mauro Battisti / Helmuth Fischer | Main role, 8 episodes |
| 2024 | The Law According to Lidia Poët | Filippo Cravero | Recurring role (season 2), 5 episodes |
| 2026 | L'invisibile - La cattura di Matteo Messina Denaro | Paolo Guido | Main role, 4 episodes |
| 2026 | Le libere donne | Filippo Lenzi | Main role, 6 episodes |
