= The Last Man on Earth (2011 film) =

- Theatrical release poster
- Directed by: Gian Alfonso Pacinotti
- Screenplay by: Gian Alfonso Pacinotti
- Based on: Nessuno mi farà del male 2010 novel by Giacomo Monti
- Produced by: Domenico Procacci
- Cinematography: Vladan Radovic
- Edited by: Clelio Benevento
- Music by: Valerio Vigliar
- Production company: Fandango
- Distributed by: Fandango
- Release dates: September 8, 2011 (Venice Film Festival); September 9, 2011
- Running time: 100 minutes
- Country: Italy
- Language: Italian
- Budget: € 2.3 million

The Last Man on Earth is a 2011 Italian science fiction drama film directed by Gian Alfonso Pacinotti. Its original Italian title is L'ultimo terrestre, which means "The last earthling." The story follows a man with relational problems while aliens visit Earth. The film premiered in competition at the 68th Venice International Film Festival.

== Cast ==
- Gabriele Spinelli as Luca Bertacci
- Anna Bellato as Anna Luini
- Luca Marinelli as Roberta
- Teco Celio as Giuseppe Geri
- Stefano Scherini as the American
- Roberto Herlitzka as Luca's father
- Paolo Mazzarelli as Walter Rasini
- Sara Rosa Losilla as alien
- Vincenzo Illiano as Gabriele Del Genovese
- Ermanna Montanari as Carmen
- Leonardo Taddei as Customer

== Production ==
Fandango produced the film in collaboration with Rai Cinema and the Toscana Film Commission. The production involved a budget of 2.3 million euros. Filming took place in Tuscany for five weeks.

== Release ==
To market the film, a viral video was released on the Internet where the real RAI newsreader Maria Cuffaro announces that extraterrestrials have arrived on Earth. The film premiered on 8 September 2011 in competition at the 68th Venice International Film Festival. Italian distribution is handled by Fandango, and it was released on 9 September. The film was released on DVD and Blu-ray in Italy on 17 January 2012.
