= The Prince's Manuscript =

- Theatrical release poster
- Directed by: Roberto Andò
- Produced by: Francesco Tornatore; Giuseppe Tornatore
- Cinematography: Enrico Lucidi
- Edited by: Massimo Quaglia
- Music by: Marco Betta
- Production companies: Sciarlò; RAI-Radiotelevisione Italiana
- Distributed by: Warner Bros. Italia
- Release date: 31 March 2000
- Running time: 106 minutes
- Country: Italy
- Language: Italian

The Prince's Manuscript (Italian: Il manoscritto del Principe) is a 2000 Italian biographical drama film. It marked the feature film debut of Roberto Andò. It won the Nastro d'Argento for Best Production.

== Cast ==
- Michel Bouquet as Giuseppe Tomasi di Lampedusa
- Jeanne Moreau as Alexandra von Wolff-Stomersee
- Paolo Briguglia as Marco Pace
- Giorgio Lupano as Guido Lanza
- Leopoldo Trieste as Lucio Piccolo
- Laurent Terzieff as old Marco Pace
- Sabrina Colle as Anna Radice
- Lucio Allocca as Bebbuccio
- Veronica Lazar as Lilja Iljascenko
