= Parents in Progress =

2019 Italian comedy-drama film

- Film poster
- Italian: Genitori quasi perfetti
- Directed by: Laura Chiossone
- Written by: Gabriele Scotti (story); Renata Ciaravino; Laura Nuccilli
- Starring: Anna Foglietta; Paolo Calabresi; Lucia Mascino; Marina Rocco; Elena Radonicich; Francesco Turbanti; Paolo Mazzarelli; Marina Occhionero
- Cinematography: Manfredo Archinto
- Edited by: Walter Marocchi
- Music by: Michele Braga
- Release date: August 29, 2019
- Running time: 93 minutes
- Country: Italy
- Language: Italian

Parents in Progress (Italian: Genitori quasi perfetti) is a 2019 Italian comedy-drama film directed by Laura Chiossone.

== Cast ==
- Anna Foglietta as Simona Riva
- Paolo Calabresi as Aldo Luini
- Lucia Mascino as Ilaria Luini
- Marina Rocco as Sabrina
- Elena Radonicich as Giorgia
- Francesco Turbanti as Paolo Lanucci
- Paolo Mazzarelli as Alessandro
- Marina Occhionero as Luisa
- Nicolò Costa as Filippo
