= The Red and the Blue (film) =

2012 film by Giuseppe Piccioni

- Film poster
- Directed by: Giuseppe Piccioni
- Written by: Giuseppe Piccioni; Francesca Manieri
- Story by: Marco Lodoli
- Starring: Margherita Buy; Riccardo Scamarcio; Roberto Herlitzka
- Cinematography: Roberto Cimatti
- Music by: Carratello-Ratchev
- Release date: 21 September 2012
- Running time: 98 minutes
- Country: Italy

The Red and the Blue (Italian: Il rosso e il blu) is a 2012 Italian drama film written and directed by Giuseppe Piccioni. For his performance Roberto Herlitzka was nominated for David di Donatello for best actor. The film also received two nominations at Nastri d'Argento Awards, for best screenplay and for best production.

== Cast ==
- Margherita Buy as Headmaster Giuliana
- Riccardo Scamarcio as Professor Giovanni Prezioso
- Roberto Herlitzka as Professor Fiorito
- Silvia D'Amico as Angela Mordini
- Davide Giordano as Enrico Brugnoli
- Nina Torresi as Melania
- Ionut Paun as Adam
- Lucia Mascino as Elena Togani
- Domiziana Cardinali as Silvana Petrucci
- Gene Gnocchi as Giuliana's lover
- Elena Lietti as Emma Tassi
