= Paolo Mazzarelli =

Italian actor

- Born: 21 January 1975 (age 51); Milan, Italy
- Years active: 2001–present

Paolo Mazzarelli (born 21 January 1975) is an Italian actor.

== Career ==
=== Theatre ===
In July 1999 he graduated as an actor in the school "Paolo Grassi" in Milan. In 1997 he was co-founder of the collective Vulesse fa'mmore co' Dioniso!, with whom he worked until September 2000, putting on two shows. During the 2001–2002 season he participated in the tour of The Seagull, by Anton Chekhov. He was tested as a director working on a project based on extracts from Bestia da stile by Pier Paolo Pasolini, conducted for the Academie internationale des Theatres of Michelle Kokosowski, in Paris and Brussels. As actor he has worked, among others, with Cesar Brie, Davide Enia, Serena Sinigaglia, Pippo Delbono, Fura dels Baus. He is the author of the text Hansel and Gretel – At the end of the night, morning, finalist at Riccione Prize in 2001 and went on stage at the Art Theatre of Milan. He also realized three spectacles:

- Pasolini, Pasolini! (2001)
- Jules Caesar (2003)
- Death by Water (2005)

=== Movies ===
His first appearance in a movie was in 2010's Nauta. He then acted in Vallanzasca - Gli angeli del male and L'ultimo terrestre.

== Selected filmography ==
- Chemical Hunger (2003)
- Nauta (2010)
- Vallanzasca - Gli angeli del male (2010)
- L'ultimo terrestre (2011)
- Parents in Progress (2019)
