= In My Room (film) =

2018 film

- Film poster
- Directed by: Ulrich Köhler
- Written by: Ulrich Köhler
- Starring: Hans Löw
- Release date: 17 May 2018 (Cannes)
- Running time: 119 minutes
- Country: Germany
- Language: German

In My Room is a 2018 German drama film directed by Ulrich Köhler. It was screened in the Un Certain Regard section at the 2018 Cannes Film Festival.

== Plot ==
Hans Löw plays Armin, whose professional and personal lives are dysfunctional. While visiting his aged relatives, his grandmother near death, he wakes up to find that every other human has apparently disappeared, and with no explanation. Armin grieves, time passes and when we come upon him next, he is settled into his ideal comfortable life, just outside the town where he grew up. Kirsi (Elena Radonicich), a lithesome footloose woman arrives. They enter a partnership, a compromise that makes Armin happier than Kirsi. They foresee different futures and that becomes clear to Kirsi. She decides to leave without Armin, at least for now.

== Cast ==
- Hans Löw as Armin
- Elena Radonicich as Kirsi
- Michael Wittenborn as Father
- Ruth Bickelhaupt as Grandmother
- Emma Bading as Rosa
- Katharina Linder as Lilo
- Felix Knopp as Editor

== Reception ==
Writing for The A.V. Club, Mike D'Angelo gave the film an A−, saying of the character study, "this droll yet poignant amalgam of the fantastic and the mundane ultimately suggests that while people can dramatically alter their behavior in response to extreme circumstances, on some fundamental level they don’t really change".

== See also ==
- Bokeh
- The Wall
