= Nicole Grimaudo =

Italian actress (born 1980)

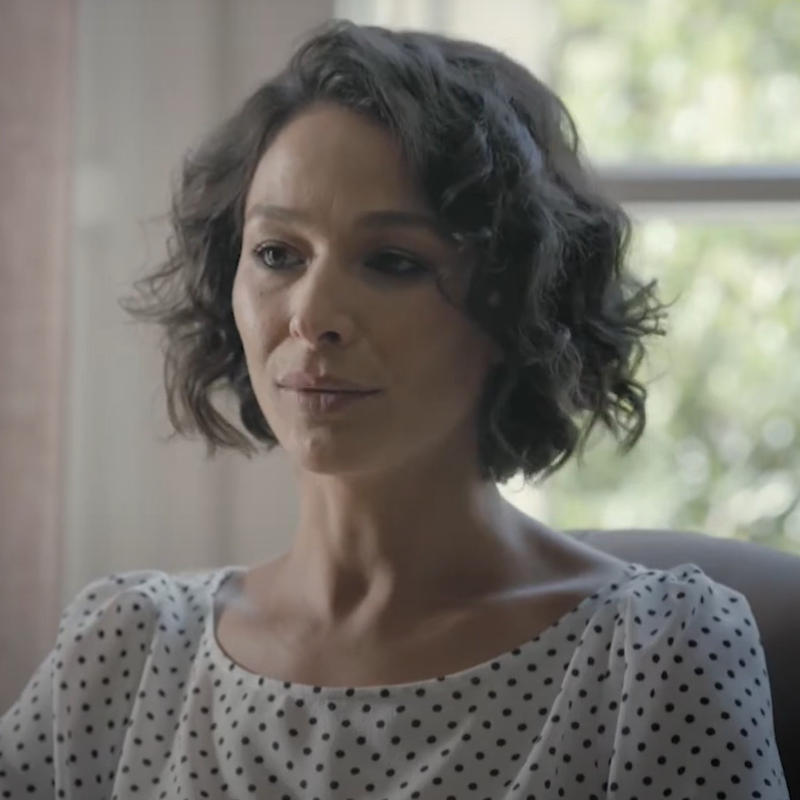
- Grimaudo in 2017
- Born: 22 April 1980 (age 46); Caltagirone, Catania, Italy
- Occupation: Actress

Nicole Grimaudo (born 22 April 1980) is an Italian actress. She began her career on the Italian television show Non è la RAI in 1994–1995, and later moved to TV and cinema films and theatre.

Her theatre roles include "Il giardino dei ciliegi" in 1995, directed by Gabriele Lavia, and Amadeus in 1999, directed by Roman Polanski.

== Filmography ==
=== Films ===
Year	Title	Role	Notes
1998	You Laugh	Lietta	Feature film debut
1998	Jolly Blu	Singer	Cameo appearance
1999	Ferdinando and Carolina	Princess of Medina	
2003	Break Free	Genny	
2003	Lost Love	Raffaella	
2003	Julius Caesar	Julia	
2008	A Perfect Day	Maja Fioravanti	
2009	Baarìa	Young Sarina	
2010	Loose Cannons	Alba Brunetti	
2011	Baciato dalla fortuna	Grazia Tirelli	
2011	L'amore fa male	Elisabetta	
2012	Workers – Pronti a tutto	Alice	
2012	All'ultima spiaggia	Ester	Segment: "Primo episodio"
2013	Out of the Blue	Lorenza Metrano	
2015	Le leggi del desiderio	Matilde Silvestri	
2024	Diamonds	Carlotta	
2026	Solo Mio	Gia	

=== Television ===
Year	Title	Role	Notes
1996	Sorellina e il principe del sogno	Child Elisea	Miniseries
1997	Racket	Sandra	Main role; 6 episodes
1998	Ultimo	Carmela	Television movie
1998	Una donna per amico	Sara	Episode: "Sola"
2000	Questa casa non è un albergo	Costanza Donati	Main role; 12 episodes
2000	Prigioniere del cuore	Marina	Television movie
2001	Il bello delle donne	Tina	Main role (season 1); 12 episodes
2002	Julius Caesar	Giulia	Miniseries
2003	Un posto tranquillo	Giorgia	Guest role; 2 episodes
2005	Il bell'Antonio	Barbara Puglisi	Miniseries
2005–2006	RIS Delitti Imperfetti	Anna Giordano	Main role (season 1), recurring role (season 2); 17 episodes
2006	Bartali: The Iron Man	Adriana Bani	Miniseries
2006	L'ispettore Coliandro	Simona Stanzani/ Nikita	Episode: "Il giorno del lupo"
2006	L'ultima frontiera	Francesca Pintore	Television movie
2007–2010	Medicina generale	Anna Morelli	Lead role; 39 episodes
2009	Il mostro di Firenze	Silvia Della Monica	Miniseries
2010	Crimini	Valeria	Episode: "Luce del nord"
2011	Dov'è mia figlia?	Inspector Anna Cavani	Miniseries
2014	Non è mai troppo tardi	Ida	Miniseries
2014	Purchè finisca bene	Manuela	Episode: "La tempesta"
2014	A testa alta – I martiri di Fiesole	Rosa Taranto	Television movie
2016	Boris Giuliano – Un poliziotto a Palermo	Ines Maria Leotta	Miniseries
2018	Immaturi: La serie	Francesca Coppetta	Main role; 8 episodes
2019	Liberi di scegliere	Enza	Television movie
2019	Ognuno è perfetto	Alessia	Miniseries
2020	Passeggeri notturni	Valeria Leonardi	Main role; 7 episodes
2020	Carlo & Malik	Marta Moselli	Main role (season 2); 12 episodes
2020	Gli orologi del diavolo	Flavia	Main role; 8 episodes
2023	Un'estate fa	Isotta	Main role; 8 episodes
2025	Maschi veri	Federica	Recurring role; 5 episodes
2025	Un professore	Irene Alessi	Main role (season 3); 12 episodes
