= Elena Radonicich =

Italian actress (born 1985)

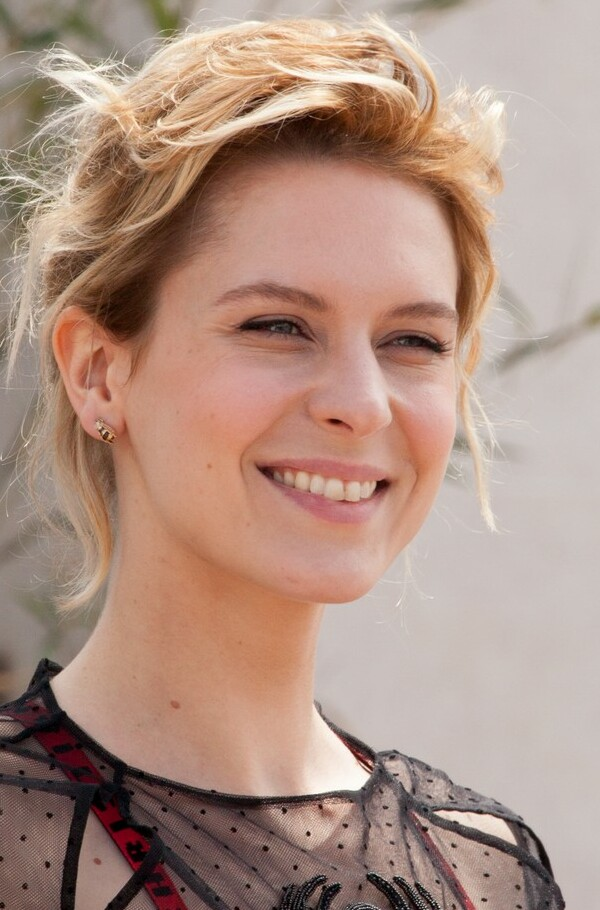
- Radonicich in 2018
- Born: 5 February 1985 (age 41); Moncalieri, Italy
- Education: Centro Sperimentale di Cinematografia
- Occupation: Actress
- Years active: 2005–present

Elena Radonicich (born 5 February 1985 in Moncalieri, Piedmont) is an Italian actress.

== Early life and career ==
Born in Moncalieri to an Italian father of Slavic-German origins and an Italian mother, she graduated in 2009 at the Centro Sperimentale di Cinematografia in Rome. From 2005 to 2011 she acted in the theater and covered some roles on TV, before making her debut in the cinema with All at Sea by Matteo Cerami. In 2012 she is the protagonist of Workers - Pronti a tutto and Tutto parla di te, in which she plays the role of a young mother who faces difficulties of motherhood and begins a path of maturation. In 2013 she stars in Adriano Olivetti - La forza di un sogno by Michele Soavi, and in 1992 by Giuseppe Gagliardi, while in 2014 she is in the cast of Italo.

In 2015 she took part in the film Alaska by Claudio Cupellini and starred in Banat - The Journey. In 2016 she starred in the TV miniseries Luisa Spagnoli by Lodovico Gasparini. In 2017 she is in the cast of Carmine Elia's La porta rossa, in which she plays the policewoman Stella Mariani, and in the TV series 1993. In 2018 she plays Enrica "Puny" Rignon, first wife of Fabrizio De André, in the film Fabrizio De André - Principe libero. She then participates in the 2018 Cannes Film Festival with the film In My Room, nominated for the Un Certain Regard award. In 2019 she is in the cast of the short film La strada vecchia, which won the prize for best short film in the "I Love GAI" competition at the 76th Venice International Film Festival 2019.

== Personal life ==
She is dating the actor Gaetano Bruno, with whom in 2015 she had a daughter, Anna.

== Filmography ==
=== Films ===
- Il solitario as Lover' s Girl (2008)
- All at Sea as Alina (2011)
- Tutto parla di te as Emma (2012)
- Workers — Pronti a tutto (2012)
- Racconti d'amore (2013)
- Italo as Laura (2014)
- Alaska as Francesca (2015)
- Banat (The Journey) as Clara (2015)
- In My Room as Kirsi (2018)
- Parents in Progress (2019)
- With or Without You (2021)
- Il Boemo (2022)
- The Great Ambition (2024)
- The Fire Within You (2026)

=== Television ===
- Stracult (2008)
- Faccia d'angelo as Grazia (2012)
- Nero Wolfe: Coppia di spade as Carla Tormic (2012)
- Altri tempi as Viola (2013)
- Adriano Olivetti — La forza di un sogno (2013)
- 1992 as Giulia Castello (2015)
- Pietro Mennea — La freccia del Sud as Manuela Olivieri (2015)
- Luisa Spagnoli (2016)
- Brennero as Eva Kofler (2022)
- Pale Mountains (2024)

=== Music videos ===
- Nina – Baroque (2012)
