= Strange Crime =

- Directed by: Roberto Andò
- Written by: Roberto Andò; Salvatore Marcarelli
- Produced by: Fabrizio Chiesa; Fabrizio Mosca
- Starring: Daniel Auteuil; Anna Mouglalis; Greta Scacchi
- Cinematography: Maurizio Calvesi
- Edited by: Claudio Di Mauro
- Music by: Ludovico Einaudi
- Production companies: Vision Productions; Titti Film; Medusa Film; Vega Film; Sirena Film
- Distributed by: Vision Distribution (France); Medusa Film (Italy)
- Release date: 2004
- Running time: 105 minutes
- Countries: France; Italy; Switzerland
- Languages: French; Italian
- Box office: $135,000

Strange Crime (French: Le prix du désir, Italian: Sotto falso nome, also known as Under a False Name) is a 2004 French-Italian-Swiss mystery-drama film directed by Roberto Andò.

== Cast ==
- Daniel Auteuil as Daniel
- Anna Mouglalis as Mila / Ewa
- Greta Scacchi as Nicoletta
- Magdalena Mielcarz as Ewa / Mila
- Giorgio Lupano as Fabrizio
- Michael Lonsdale as David
- Serge Merlin as Daniel's Father
