= Last Night of Amore =

2023 Italian film directed by Andrea Di Stefano

- Official release poster
- Directed by: Andrea Di Stefano
- Screenplay by: Andrea Di Stefano
- Produced by: Marco Cohen; Benedetto Habib; Fabrizio Donvito; Daniel Campos Pavoncelli; Francesco Melzi d’Eril; Gabriele Moratti; Marco Colombo
- Starring: Pierfrancesco Favino; Linda Caridi; Antonio Gerardi; Francesco Di Leva; Camilla Semino Favro
- Cinematography: Guido Michelotti
- Edited by: Giogiò Franchini
- Music by: Santi Pulvirenti
- Production companies: Indiana Production; MeMo Films; Adler Entertainment
- Distributed by: Vision Distribution
- Release dates: 24 February 2023 (Berlinale); 9 March 2023 (Italy)
- Running time: 124 minutes
- Country: Italy
- Language: Italian
- Box office: est. US$4.6 million

Last Night of Amore (Italian: L’ultima notte di Amore) is a 2023 Italian crime thriller film written and directed by Andrea Di Stefano. The film starring Pierfrancesco Favino, Linda Caridi, Antonio Gerardi, Francesco Di Leva, and Camilla Semino Favro, depicts the story of Franco Amore, who is writing his farewell speech on the night of his retirement. Nobody knew, though, that night would turn out to be the longest and most difficult of his entire professional life.

It was selected for the 73rd Berlin International Film Festival in the Berlinale Special Gala, where it had its world premiere on 24 February 2023. It was released in cinemas on 9 March 2023. The film was shortlisted for submission to 96th Academy Awards as Italian entry for Best International Feature Film in September 2023.

== Cast ==
- Pierfrancesco Favino as Franco Amore
- Linda Caridi as Viviana
- Antonio Gerardi as Cosimo Forcella
- Francesco Di Leva as Dino
- Camilla Semino Favro as Carabiniere Daria Criscito
- Martin Montero Baez as Ernesto
- Wang Fei as Feifei
- Pang Bo as Mission
- Shi Yang Shi as Chun-Ba
- Xu Ruichi as Gang Ma
- Mauro Milone
- Carlo Gallo
- Mauro Negri
- Fabrizio Rocchi
- Katia Mironova
- Chandra Perkins

== Soundtrack ==
1. "Fate Tiptoes to a Party" by Santi Pulvirenti
2. "Last Night" by Santi Pulvirenti
3. "Fathers" by Santi Pulvirenti
4. "The Mechanics of Amore" by Santi Pulvirenti
5. "The Ambition of Being Honest" by Santi Pulvirenti
6. "Spectrum" by Santi Pulvirenti
7. "Alba" by Santi Pulvirenti
8. "The Brain of a Dying Man" by Santi Pulvirenti
9. "Melò Dia" by Santi Pulvirenti
10. "The Sky Is Looking Down at You" by Santi Pulvirenti
11. "The Carp" by Santi Pulvirenti
12. "Don't Do It" by Santi Pulvirenti
13. "Milano da bere" by Santi Pulvirenti

== Release ==
Last Night of Amore had its world premiere on 24 February 2023 as part of the 73rd Berlin International Film Festival, in the Berlinale Special Gala. It was released in cinemas on 9 March 2023. It was invited at the 28th Busan International Film Festival in 'World Cinema' section and was screened on 7 October 2023.

== Reception ==
=== Box office ===
The film opened with US$1,027,372, and as of 27 May 2023 it is the eleventh highest-grossing film released in the year 2023 with gross of US$3,503,276 at the Italian box office.

=== Critical response ===
On the review aggregator Rotten Tomatoes website, the film has an approval rating of 86% based on 7 reviews, with an average rating of 6.8/10.

Vittoria Scarpa reviewing for Cineuropa praised the performance of Pierfrancesco Favino and Linda Caridi writing, "Favino's acting talents are well known, and to note here in particular is the performance of Linda Caridi, who gracefully brings to life a very complex and multifaceted female character." Writing about the director and scriptwriter Andrea Di Stefano, Scarpa stated, "[Di Stefano] directs this thriller/drama with a steady pulse, succeeding in conveying the right amount of suspense and subterranean tension, and with a good narrative rhythm, effectively using the device of re-enacting the same scenes from different points of view." Lee Marshall for ScreenDaily writing a positive review said, "It’s been a while since we’ve seen such a stylish Italian crime thriller."

=== Accolades ===
Award	Date of ceremony	Category	Nominee(s)	Result	Ref.
David di Donatello Awards	May 3, 2024	Best Director	Andrea Di Stefano	Nominated	
David di Donatello Awards	May 3, 2024	Best Actress	Linda Caridi	Nominated	
David di Donatello Awards	May 3, 2024	Best Score	Santi Pulvirenti	Nominated	
David di Donatello Awards	May 3, 2024	Best Editing	Giogiò Franchini	Nominated	
