= The Confessions (film) =

- Italian theatrical release poster
- Italian: Le confessioni
- Directed by: Roberto Andò
- Written by: Roberto Andò; Angelo Pasquini
- Produced by: Angelo Barbagallo
- Starring: Toni Servillo; Connie Nielsen; Pierfrancesco Favino; Marie-Josée Croze; Moritz Bleibtreu; Lambert Wilson; Daniel Auteuil
- Cinematography: Maurizio Calvesi
- Edited by: Clelio Benevento
- Music by: Nicola Piovani
- Production companies: Bibi Film TV; Barbary Films; Rai Cinema; Canal+ Ciné+
- Distributed by: 01 Distribution (Italy); Bellissima Films (France)
- Release dates: 21 April 2016 (Italy); 25 January 2017 (France)
- Running time: 100 minutes
- Countries: Italy; France
- Languages: Italian; English; French; German
- Box office: $1.6 million

The Confessions (Italian: Le confessioni; French: Les confessions) is a 2016 thriller drama film directed by Roberto Andò. It stars Toni Servillo, Connie Nielsen, Pierfrancesco Favino, Marie-Josée Croze, Moritz Bleibtreu, Lambert Wilson and Daniel Auteuil.

== Plot ==
A G8 meeting is being held at the luxury Grand Hotel in Heiligendamm on the Mecklenburg Baltic coast in Germany. The world's most powerful economists are gathered to enact important provisions that will deeply influence the world economy.

One of the guests is a mysterious Italian monk, invited by Daniel Roché, the director of the International Monetary Fund. He wants the monk to receive his confession, that night, in secret. The next morning, Roché is found dead.

== Cast ==
- Toni Servillo as Roberto Salus
- Daniel Auteuil as Daniel Roché
- Pierfrancesco Favino as Italian minister
- Moritz Bleibtreu as Mark Klein
- Connie Nielsen as Claire Seth
- Marie-Josée Croze as Canadian minister
- Lambert Wilson as Roché's lover
- Richard Sammel as German minister
- Johan Heldenbergh as Michael Wintzl
- Togo Igawa as Japanese minister
- Aleksei Guskov as Russian minister
- Stéphane Freiss as French minister
- Julian Ovenden as Matthew Price
- Andy de la Tour as UK minister
- Ernesto D'Argenio as Ciro the hotel waiter

== Accolades ==
Award / Film Festival	Category	Recipients and nominees	Result
Golden Ciak Awards	Best Production Design	Giada Esposito	Nominated
Nastro d'Argento	Best Director	Roberto Andò	Nominated
Nastro d'Argento	Best Cinematography	Maurizio Calvesi	Won
Nastro d'Argento	Best Sound	Fulgenzio Ceccon	Nominated
Karlovy Vary International Film Festival	Ecumenical Jury Prize		Won
Karlovy Vary International Film Festival	Crystal Globe		Nominated
