= Marco Betta =

Italian composer

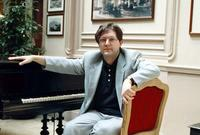
- Marco Betta

Background information
- Born: 25 July 1964 (age 61); Enna, Italy
- Genres: Classical, Contemporary classical, Film score
- Occupations: Composer, Teacher
- Years active: 1982–present

Marco Betta (born 25 July 1964) is an Italian composer.

== Biography ==
Marco Betta, author of opera, film score, orchestral and chamber music, has studied composition at the Conservatorio di Palermo with Eliodoro Sollima. Afterwards, he improved his studies with Armando Gentilucci and Salvatore Sciarrino.

He made his debut in 1982 at the Festival Spaziomusica of Cagliari, thenceforth his compositions are regularly performed in the main Italian and European institutions. His musical language merges old Sicilian cultures with the main techniques of the contemporary music, in particular the minimalism and the neotonality genres.

Between 1994 and 2002, he was artistic director of the Teatro Massimo, working on the project for the reopening of the theatre, that happened after 23 years on 12 May 1997, with a concert of the theatre choir conducted by Franco Mannino and the Berliner Philharmoniker Orchestra conducted by Claudio Abbado.

Marco Betta teaches composition at the Conservatoire of Palermo.

== Works ==
=== Opera ===
- Bellini ultime luci, 1993. Publisher: Sonzogno.
- Sabaoth e Sammael, 1994. Publisher: Sonzogno.
- Averroè, 1999, three scenes from Averroè, Le mille e una notte, Il Cantare del Cid. Text written by Daniele Martino. Publisher: Sonzogno
- Il Fantasma nella cabina, 2002, opera. Text written by Andrea Camilleri and libretto by Rocco Mortelliti. Duration: 110'. Publisher: Sonzogno.
- Il mistero del finto cantante, 2002–2003, opera. Libretto written by Rocco Mortelliti from Le Inchieste Del Commissario Collura by Andrea Camilleri. Duration: 55'. Publisher: Ricordi.
- Che fine ha fatto la piccola Irene?, 2002–2003, opera. Libretto written by Rocco Mortelliti from Le Inchieste Del Commissario Collura by Andrea Camilleri. Duration: 50'. Publisher: Ricordi.
- Sette storie per lasciare il mondo, 2006, opera. Film directed by Roberto Andò, performed at the Teatro Bellini di Catania in September 2006. Publisher: Ricordi.
- Natura viva, 2010, opera. Libretto written by Ruggero Cappuccio, performed at the Maggio Musicale Fiorentino in Florence, in June 2010. Publisher: Ricordi.

=== Ballet ===
- Il viaggio del Commissario Collura, 2004, ballet, libretto written by Rocco Mortelliti from "Le inchieste del Commissario Collura" by Andrea Camilleri. First performance at Teatro Filarmonico, on 8 December 2004, conductor David Coleman, choreograph Maria Grazia Garofoli, orchestra and corps de ballet of the Fondazione Arena di Verona. Duration: 30'. Publisher: Ricordi.

=== Orchestra ===
- Città azzurra dall'alba all'alba for woodwind and orchestra (2005). Publisher: Ricordi.
- Corone di pietra for tenor, chorus and orchestra (2003–2004), text written by Daniele Martino. Publisher: Ricordi.
- Lacrime for orchestra (2004); in memory of all the victims of the Mafia and violence. Publisher: Ricordi.
- Lux æterna per soprano, tenor, chorus and orchestra, (1993 ), text written by Vincenzo Consolo, from the Requiem per le vittime della mafia. Publisher: Sonzogno.
- Magaria for voice and orchestra (2001), text written by Andrea Camilleri. Publisher: Sonzogno.
- Resurrexi for choir and orchestra (2000), from the Missa Solemnis Resurrectionis. Publisher: Sonzogno.
- Senti l'eco, aria for orchestra (1989). Publisher: Ricordi.
- Sorpresa, aria for soprano and orchestra (1993), text written by Dario Oliveri. Publisher: Ricordi.

=== Chamber music ===
- Ballata for violin and piano (1991). Publisher: Ricordi.
- Cadentia Sidera fantasia for piano and strings (1990). Publisher: Ricordi.
- In ombra d'amore ballata for viola (1988). Publisher: Ricordi.
- Maiores umbrae for five instruments (1989). Publisher: Ricordi.
- Soledad for eleven string instruments (1992). Publisher: Ricordi.
- Ultimo canto for viola (2001). Publisher: Ricordi.
- Ombre sul mare per piano, clarinet, viola, violoncello and contrabass (2003).

=== Incidental music ===
- Paolo Borsellino essendo stato, 2004, stage music for the text and the stage written by Ruggero Cappuccio. Directed by Ruggero Cappuccio, Production: Teatro Segreto. Publisher: Ricordi.
- La notte delle lucciole, 2008, stage music, directed by Roberto Andò and Marco Baliani, from texts written by Leonardo Sciascia and Pier Paolo Pasolini. Production: Nuovo Teatro.
- Il tredicesimo punto, 2011, written by Sergio Claudio Perroni, directed by Roberto Andò. Production: Teatro Stabile di Catania.
- Leonilde, 2011. Production: Teatro Stabile di Catania.
- La Mennulara, 2011. Production: Teatro Stabile di Catania.

=== Film scores ===
- The Prince's Manuscript, (2000), soundtrack, directed by Roberto Andò. Production: Sciarlò Film di Giuseppe e Franco Tornatore. Distribution: Warner Bros. Publisher: Ricordi.
- Secret Journey, (2006), soundtrack, directed by Roberto Andò. Production: Medusa Film and Manigolda Film. Publisher: Emi Music – Ricordi.
- Soundtrack (contributes) of the documentary film Oltre Selinunte (2006).
- Maria Montessori, una vita per i bambini" (2007), soundtrack, directed by Gianluca Maria Tavarelli. Production: Tao Due Film. Publisher: Rti Music – Ricordi.
- Aldo Moro il Presidente (2008), soundtrack, directed by Gianluca Maria Tavarelli. Production: Tao Due Film. Publisher: Rti Music – Ricordi.
- Con gli occhi di un altro (2010), soundtrack, directed by Antonio Raffaele Addamo. Production: Tersite. Publisher: Unda Maris Edizioni.
- Le cose che restano, (2010), soundtrack, directed by Gianluca Maria Tavarelli. Production: Angelo Barbagallo for BiBi Film TV.
- The Stolen Caravaggio, (2018), soundtrack, directed by Roberto Andò.

== Discography ==
=== CD ===
- Il Manoscritto del Principe, 2000, score from the film directed by Roberto Andò. Orchestra AMIT, Marco Betta Orchestra conductor. Publisher: Ricordi.
- Il Viaggio di Ferruccio, 2006, Ensemble Ottava Nota, Anita Vitale voice, Orchestra Roma Sinfonietta, Marco Betta Orchestra Conductor. Publisher: Ricordi.
- Maria Montessori – una vita per i bambini, 2009, score from the fiction directed by Gianluca Maria Tavarelli. Publisher: Ricordi.
- Aldo Moro, 2009, score from the fiction directed by Gianluca Maria Tavarelli. Publisher: Ricordi.
- Con gli occhi di un altro, 2010, score from the film directed by Antonio Raffaele Addamo. Publisher: Unda Maris Edizioni.

=== DVD ===
- La Corona di pietra, starring Plácido Domingo, La Corona di pietra Sony Music, conducted by Ivo Guerra.

== Video ==
- Resurrexit
- Resurrexi Orchestra della Sagra Musicale Umbra, Missa Solemnis Resurrectionis, Orvieto, Italy, March 23, 2002
- Andante Notturno from the CD Composers- Luca Pincini on the cello – Gilda Buttà on the piano
- The theatre of Segesta by Ivan Tagliavia
- The temple of Segesta by Ivan Tagliavia
- Il Manoscritto del Principe ballet at the Teatro Metropolitan – June 2002
- Il Manoscritto del Principe film score from the film The Prince's Manuscript played by the Trio Siciliano at the RAI, Palermo, June 2008
- Puer Natus Est Orchestra e Gruppo Corale "Santa Cecilia" di Fabriano, Conductor Marcello Marini – Christmas 2007
- Resurrectio by Enzo Venezia, Luigi Pintacuda, produced by Andrea Perla, Palermo, 2008
- La memoria degli altri from the film Secret Journey directed by Roberto Andò
- La forza dell'aquila – Social Spot for the reconstruction of the Italian city L'Aquila after the hearthquake, 2009
