= All at Sea (2011 film) =

- Directed by: Matteo Cerami
- Written by: Vincenzo Cerami; Matteo Cerami
- Starring: Marco Giallini; Ilaria Occhini; Ambra Angiolini; Anna Bonaiuto; Libero De Rienzo; Francesco Montanari; Claudia Zanella; Sergio Fiorentini; Vincenzo Cerami; Franco Pistoni; Elena Radonicich; Rodolfo Laganà; Ninetto Davoli; Ennio Fantastichini; Gigi Proietti
- Cinematography: Maurizio Calvesi
- Music by: Nicola Piovani
- Release date: March 11, 2011
- Running time: 95 minutes
- Country: Italy
- Language: Italian

All at Sea (Italian: Tutti al mare) is a 2011 Italian comedy film, starring Gigi Proietti. It marked the directorial debut of Matteo Cerami, who also signed the script with his father Vincenzo Cerami. The film is intended as a sort of sequel of Sergio Citti's Casotto, which Cerami co-wrote with Citti in 1977.

== Plot ==
The film is based on the funny bickering between two cousins Nino and Maurizio.

== Cast ==
- Gigi Proietti: Nino
- Marco Giallini: Maurizio
- Ilaria Occhini: Miss Valeria
- Ninetto Davoli: Alfredo
- Ambra Angiolini: Giovanna
- Claudia Zanella: Sara
- Anna Bonaiuto: Adalgisa
- Libero De Rienzo: Nando
- Francesco Montanari: Gigi
- Valerio Mastandrea: Fantino
- Ennio Fantastichini: Suicida
- Sergio Fiorentini: Nonno
- Vincenzo Cerami: Gianni
- Franco Pistoni:Geroboamo
- Elena Radonicich:Alina
- Giorgio Gobbi:
- Rodolfo Laganà: benzinaio
- Pippo Baudo: himself

== See also ==
- List of Italian films of 2011
