= L'amore fa male =

L'Amore fa Male
- L'Amore fa Male
- Directed by: Mirca Viola
- Written by: Mirca Viola; Cinzia Panzettini
- Produced by: Enzo Gallo
- Starring: Stefania Rocca; Paolo Briguglia; Nicole Grimaudo
- Cinematography: Fabrizio Lucci
- Edited by: Antonio Siciliano
- Music by: Andrea Guerra
- Release date: 7 November 2011 (Italy)
- Country: Italy
- Language: Italian

L’amore fa male (English: Love Hurts) is a 2011 Italian film. It was directed by Mirca Viola. The screenplay was written by Mirca Viola and Cinzia Panzettini. The film stars Stefania Rocca, Paolo Briguglia and Nicole Grimaudo.

== Plot ==
Germana is an unlucky, untalented aspiring actress, a somewhat inconsiderate mother and the mistress of a wealthy lawyer who supports her financially. Elisabetta, her neighbor, conversely is a successful doctor who is too closed in her schemes to notice that her husband is homosexual until she is left alone with many questions.

When Gianmarco, a family man in a job crisis, saves Germana's daughter from an accident, sparks fly between them. Too bad she does not know that he is married and is friends with Elisabetta. Fate confronts them with reality when, during a vacation in Sicily, they all come together, forcing them to confront each other.

== Cast ==
- Claudio Bigagli
- Paolo Briguglia as Gianmarco
- Stefano Dionisi as Aldo
- Diane Fleri as Antonia
- Nicole Grimaudo as Elisabetta
- Stefania Rocca as Germana

== See also ==
- List of Italian films of 2011
