= Secret Journey (2006 film) =

- Theatrical release poster
- Directed by: Roberto Andò
- Starring: Alessio Boni; Donatella Finocchiaro; Valeria Solarino; Claudia Gerini; Marco Baliani; Emir Kusturica
- Cinematography: Maurizio Calvesi
- Music by: Marco Betta
- Distributed by: Medusa Film
- Release date: 2006
- Running time: 107 minutes
- Country: Italy
- Language: Italian

Secret Journey (Italian: Viaggio segreto) is a 2006 Italian romantic drama film directed by Roberto Andò. It won the Nastro d'Argento for Best Cinematography.

== Cast ==
- Alessio Boni as Leo Ferri
- Donatella Finocchiaro as Anna Olivieri
- Valeria Solarino as Ale Ferri
- Claudia Gerini as Adele
- Marco Baliani as Michele
- Emir Kusturica as Harold
- Roberto Herlitzka as Padre Angelo
