= With or Without You (2021 film) =

2021 Italian film

- Directed by: Stefano Sardo
- Screenplay by: Stefano Sardo; Valentina Gaia
- Produced by: Matteo Rovere; Stefano Sardo; Andrea Paris; Ines Vasiljevic
- Starring: Guido Caprino; Elena Radonicich
- Cinematography: Gergely Pohárnok
- Edited by: Sarah McTeigue
- Music by: Andrea Bergesio; Valentina Gaia
- Release date: September 6, 2021 (Venice)
- Language: Italian

With or Without You (Italian: Una relazione) is a 2021 Italian romantic drama film co-written and directed by Stefano Sardo, at his feature film debut. It premiered at the 78th edition of the Venice Film Festival.

== Cast ==
- Guido Caprino as Tommaso
- Elena Radonicich as Alice
- Libero De Rienzo as Luca
- Thony as Antonia
- Enrica Bonaccorti as Laura
- Luigi Diberti as Giorgio Scorza
- Tommaso Ragno as Rigoni
- Jalil Lespert as Mathieu
- Francesca Chillemi as Nicole Santini
- Daniela Piperno as Bianca

== Production ==
The film was conceived about 10 years before its production and is based on the autobiographical novel with the same name written together by Stefano Sardo and singer-songwriter Valentina Gaia, which recounts in diary form the crisis and end of their 17-year-long romantic relationship. The shootings of the film started in Rome in October 2020.

== Release ==
The film had its premiere at the 78th Venice International Film Festival, in the Giornate degli Autori sidebar. It was theatrically released in Italy by Ascent Film on 13 September 2021.

== Reception ==
The film has been described as "a beautiful and delicate first work imbued with the love for storytelling and music."
