= Remember? (2018 film) =

2018 Italian-French film

- Directed by: Valerio Mieli
- Screenplay by: Valerio Mieli
- Starring: Luca Marinelli; Linda Caridi
- Cinematography: Daria D'Antonio
- Edited by: Desideria Rayner
- Release date: 2018
- Language: Italian

Remember? (Italian: Ricordi?) is a 2018 Italian-French romance film written and directed by Valerio Mieli.

The film premiered at the Giornate degli Autori section of the 75th Venice International Film Festival.

== Cast ==
- Luca Marinelli as Him
- Linda Caridi as Her
- Giovanni Anzaldo as Marco
- Camilla Diana as the Redhead Girl
- David Brandon as the Father of Her
- Andrea Pennacchi as the Father of Him

== Reception ==
On Rotten Tomatoes, the film has an approval rating of 80% based on 5 reviews. The film received three David di Donatello nominations, for best screenplay, best actress (Linda Caridi) and best cinematography.
