= Mom + Mom =

2018 film by Karole Di Tommaso

- Film poster
- Mamma + Mamma
- Directed by: Karole Di Tommaso
- Written by: Karole Di Tommaso; Chiara Ridolfi
- Starring: Linda Caridi; Maria Roveran
- Cinematography: Sara Purgatorio
- Edited by: Martina Caggianelli
- Music by: Giulia Anania; Marta Venturini
- Production company: BiBi Film
- Release date: October 22, 2018 (Rome)
- Running time: 81 minutes
- Country: Italy
- Language: Italian

Mom + Mom (Italian: Mamma + Mamma) is an Italian drama film, directed by Karole Di Tommaso and released in 2018. The film stars Linda Caridi and Maria Roveran as a lesbian couple who want to become mothers of a child, and are struggling with the bureaucratic and financial burdens of the fertility clinic system.

The film premiered on the Alice nella Città stream at the Rome Film Festival in October 2018, before going into wider theatrical release in early 2019. It was picked up for international distribution by TLA Releasing in the United Kingdom and Strand Releasing in the United States, and screened at various international LGBT film festivals.

Caridi won the award for Best Performance in a Female Role at the 2019 Iris Prize festival.
