= Ischia Global Film & Music Festival =

Annual film festival held in Ischia, Italy

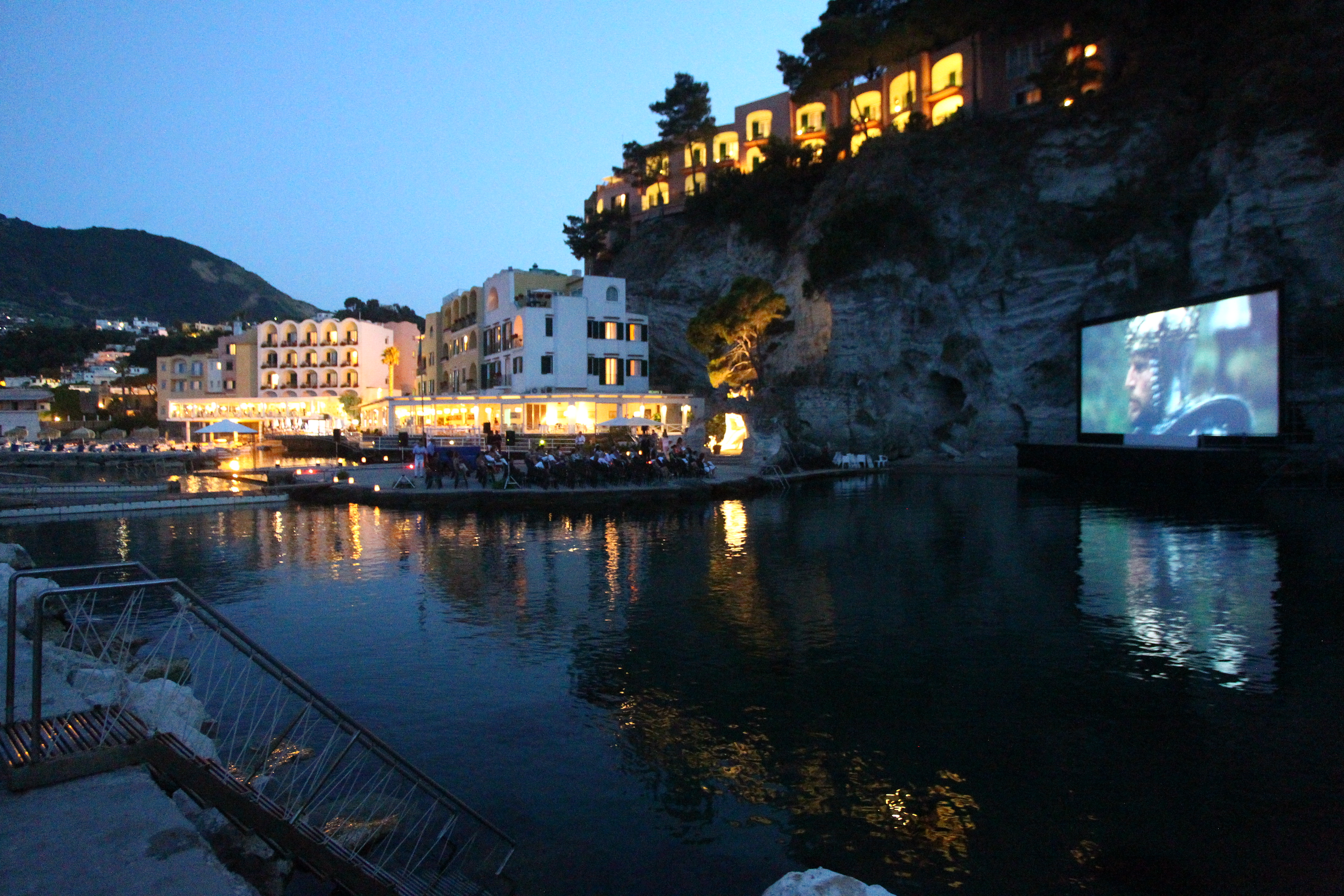
- Location: Ischia, Italy
- Established: 2003; 23 years ago
- Founded by: Pascal Vicedomini
- Website: ischiaglobal.com

Ischia Global Film & Music Festival, also known as Ischia Global Fest, is an annual festival of film and music held each July in Ischia, Italy. Founded in 2003, the festival presents awards to films, filmmakers, actors, musicians, and artists in a wide variety of categories.

== History ==
The festival was founded by Pascal Vicedomini and was first held in 2003. It became known for featuring then-unknown artists who later became stars, including Michael Fassbender, Gerard Butler, Forest Whitaker, and Michel Hazanavicius.

The 2015 edition was dedicated to Whitney Houston, who died in 2012. The biopic Whitney was screened along with several of her films, including The Bodyguard. That same year, Boulevard, the final film starring Robin Williams before his death, had its European premiere on the festival's opening night.

In 2016, Ghostbusters, The Legend Of Tarzan, and Mr. Church were screened at the festival.

In 2021, the festival focused on the ocean and the environment, featuring the Netflix documentary My Octopus Teacher, with sponsorship by Leonardo DiCaprio and his foundation.

== Overview ==
The film festival hosts international and Italian films, filmmakers, and celebrities. In addition, the event holds seminars and marketing events, such as the V Global Production Summit and the V World Script Market.

Founder Pascal Vicedomini is the festival producer, with Aldo Arcangioli serving as president, and Franco Nero, Marina Cicogna, Gianni Ambrosino, Mark Canton, Dante Ferretti, Francesca Lo Schiavo, Enrico Lucherini, and Vanni Fondi on the board. It is sponsored by the Ischia International Arts Academy, the DG Cinema and Audiovision of MiC, and is a member of AFIC (Association of Italian Film Festivals), operating in partnership with cultural academies.

The festival screens films made by and for streaming services, such as Netflix, as well as those made for cinemas.

== Awards ==
The festival presents awards across a range of categories, including:

- Ischia Best Feature Award
- Ischia Best Documentary Feature Award
- Ischia Best Short Film Award
- Ischia Fiction Award
- Ischia Italian Film Award
- Ischia Global Award – Director of the Year
- Ischia Breakout Director / Breakout Italian Director Award
- Ischia Italian Director Award
- Ischia Rising Star Award
- Ischia Producer of the Year Award
- Ischia King of Comedy Award
- Ischia Prince of Comedy - Carlo Vanzina Award
- Ischia Italian Actor of the Year Award
- Ischia Actor Award
- Ischia Actress Award
- Ischia Breakout Actor Award
- Ischia Breakout Actress Award
- Ischia Italian Worldwide Award
- Ischia Filmmaker of the Year Award
- Ischia Exploit Award
- Ischia Newcomer Award
- Ischia People Award
- Ischia Dubbing Award
- Ischia Global Ambassador Award
- Ischia Global Art Award / Enrico Job Art Award
- Ischia Master of Cinematic Art Award
- William Walton Legend Award
- Luchino Visconti Legend Award
- Ischia Film & Music Award
- Ischia Global Music Award

== Winners ==
In 2012, Paolo and Vittorio Taviani were honored with the Ischia Legend Award, followed by Nicolas Cage and Samuel L. Jackson in 2013.

In 2016, Vittorio Storaro and Barry Morrow received the Ischia Legend Award. Bruce Beresford received the Luchino Visconti Legend Award, named after Italian film director Luchino Visconti. Prior recipients of the award include Taylor Hackford, Tom Hooper, Paul Haggis, Stephen Frears, Alan Parker, Terry Gilliam, Jim Sheridan, Joel Schumacher, and Baz Luhrmann.

In 2017, Lily Collins received the Rising Star Award for her performance in To the Bone.

In 2023, Brendan Fraser was honoured as Global Actor of the Year at the festival, Rob Marshall received the Luchino Visconti Legend Award, and songwriter Diane Warren received the William Walton Legend Award. English composer Simon Franglen won the Ischia Film & Music Award, while singer Sofia Carson received the Ischia Global Music Award.

In 2024, Trudie Styler received the Ischia Award for Best Documentary for Posso entrare? An Ode To Naples.

In 2025, Malcolm McDowell and Steven Bauer were honored at the festival.

In 2026, Abel Ferrara was honoured with the Luchino Visconti Award, and Cuba Gooding Jr. received the Ischia Art Award.
