= Italo (film) =

- Directed by: Alessia Scarso
- Starring: Marco Bocci; Elena Radonicich; Barbara Tabita
- Cinematography: Daria D'Antonio
- Music by: Marco Cascone
- Release date: 5 April 2014 (Reel to Real)
- Running time: 104 minutes
- Language: Italian

Italo (also known as Italo Barocco) is a 2014 Italian comedy film written and directed by Alessia Scarso. It is based on the true story of a mongrel dog that thanks to its skills earned the honorary citizenship of Scicli, Ragusa.

== Cast ==
- Marco Bocci as Antonio Blanco
- Elena Radonicich as Laura
- Barbara Tabita as Luisa Nigro
- Vincenzo Lauretta as Meno
- Martina Antoci as Chiara
- Matteo Korreshi as Paolo
- Lucia Sardo as Concetta
- Andrea Tidona as Mario
- Marcello Perracchio as Marcello
- Tuccio Musumeci as Natalino
- Leo Gullotta as Narrator (voice)
