= Aldo Arcangioli =

Italian businessperson

Aldo Arcangioli is an Italian businessman, video producer, and sustainable mobility advocate.

== Career ==
=== Advocacy and business ===
In 2004, Arcangioli founded Charterbay LLC, a maritime services start-up in Dubai.

He was the founder of start-up Emotion in 2013, a Neapolitan company operating in the field of electric mobility.

In 2020, researcher Luigi Maria Pepe and Arcangioli produced an article about renewable energy in Italy.

=== Film and video production ===
In 2006, Arcangioli co-produced the film I, the Other, which was nominated for a 2007 David di Donatello.

In 2019, he was executive producer of the music video for the song Dimane, e mo by Andrea Sannino.

== Other roles ==
In 2021, Arcangioli served as president of the Ischia Global Film & Music Festival, a role he continues as of 2025.

Also in 2021, he was a guest of the "Los Angeles, Italia – Film, Fashion and Art Fest", and his company provided lighting for a festival event one evening that promoted skin checks for melanoma.

Prior to 2017, Arcangioli had worked as a diplomatic and commercial advisor for Sheikh Falah bin Zayed Al Nahyan of the United Arab Emirates.

== Recognition and awards ==
On 4 February 2019, he received the "Assotutela" 2018/2019 award for Italian Excellence at the Senate of the Republic.
