= Pale Mountains =

Italian mystery thriller television series

- Italian Rai 1 poster
- Italian: Brennero
- Genre: Crime drama; Mystery; Thriller
- Written by: Carlo Mazzotta; Andrea Valagussa
- Directed by: Davide Marengo; Giuseppe Bonito
- Starring: Elena Radonicich; Matteo Martari; Richard Sammel; Giovanni Carta; Lavinia Longhi; Paolo Briguglia; Lia Greco; Anita Zagaria; Katja Lechthaler; Luka Zunic; Sinéad Thornhill
- Composers: Giuliano Taviani; Carmelo Travia
- Country of origin: Italy
- Original languages: Italian; German
- No. of seasons: 1
- No. of episodes: 8

Production
- Executive producer: Ornella Bernabei
- Producers: Daria Hensemberger; Luca Poldelmengo; Rosario Rinaldo; Maddalena Rinaldo
- Cinematography: Emanuele Pasquet; Alfredo Betrò
- Editor: Lorenzo Campera
- Running time: 48–57 minutes
- Production companies: Rai Fiction; Cross Productions

Original release
- Network: Rai 1; RaiPlay
- Release: 16 September 2024 – present

Pale Mountains (Italian: Brennero; transl. Brenner) is an Italian crime drama television series directed by Davide Marengo and Giuseppe Bonito. It began airing on Rai 1 and RaiPlay on 16 September 2024.

== Premise ==
Two detectives investigate a serial killer in Bolzano, South Tyrol.

== Cast ==
=== Main ===
- Elena Radonicich as Eva Kofler
- Matteo Martari as Paolo Costa
- Richard Sammel as Gerhard Kofler
- Giovanni Carta as Andreas Muller
- Lavinia Longhi as Michela Rossi
- Paolo Briguglia as "Il Mostro"
- Lia Greco as Cecilia Martini
- Anita Zagaria as Luisa Lopez
- Katja Lechthaler as Lena Pilcher
- Luka Zunic as Tommaso Rossi
- Sinéad Thornhill as Mathilde Comi

=== Recurring ===
- Laura Riccioli as Clara Bauer
- Laura Serena as Doctor Majore
- Georg Kaser as Klaus Berger
- Caterina Casini as Marta
- Naike Anna Silipo as Giovanna Ferrari
- Fulvio Falzarano as Chief Pedrotti
- Paolo Romano as Giacomo Prati
- Rimau Ritzberger Grillo as Martin
- Ralph Palka as Count Peter Reiderstahl
- Roberta Rovelli as Letizia
- Verena Buss as Sonia Mahr
- Maurizio Tabani as Eriberto Villa
- Karolina Porcari as Corinne Fischer
- Bruno De Stephanis as Doctor Lojacono
- Nicolai Bosca as Matteo Bendotti
- Marcos Piacentini as Sergio
- Ennio Coltorti as Franco Venturi

== Episodes ==
No.	Title	Duration	Original release date
1	"Mostri dal passato - Parte 1"	52 min	16 September 2024
2	"Mostri dal passato - Parte 2"	51 min	16 September 2024
3	"Echi della sera - Parte 1"	50 min	23 September 2024
4	"Echi della sera - Parte 2"	53 min	23 September 2024
5	"Terzo livello - Parte 1"	53 min	30 September 2024
6	"Terzo livello - Parte 2"	55 min	30 September 2024
7	"Cadono le maschere - Parte 1"	48 min	7 October 2024
8	"Cadono le maschere - Parte 2"	57 min	7 October 2024

== Production ==
The series was shot on location in Bolzano in 2022.

== Release ==
The series began airing on Rai 1 on 16 September 2024. On 10 October 2024, it was acquired for international distribution in the United States, Canada, the United Kingdom, Ireland, and Turkey.
