= Roberto Herlitzka =

Italian actor (1937–2024)

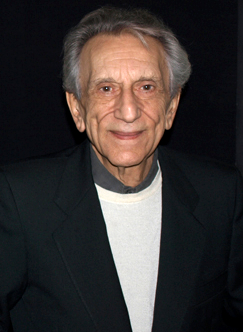
- Herlitzka in 2010
- Born: 2 October 1937; Turin, Italy
- Died: 31 July 2024 (aged 86); Rome, Italy
- Occupation: Actor
- Years active: 1960–2024

Roberto Herlitzka (2 October 1937 – 31 July 2024) was an Italian theatre and film actor. He has appeared in 38 films since 1973. In 2004 he won the David di Donatello for Best Supporting Actor and Nastro d'Argento for Best Actor for his role in Good Morning, Night.

== Biography ==
Herlitzka was born in Turin, the second son after his brother Paolo, to Bruno Herlitzka, a Czech Jew from Brno who emigrated with his family, and to Micaela Berruti, a Catholic Italian who worked as a translator. His parents' marriage ended with a declaration of nullity, and his father, after marrying the painter Giorgina Lattes, emigrated to Argentina in January 1939 to escape the Italian racial laws, which he and his brother also escaped by temporarily obtaining their mother's surname, Berruti. In 1947, his half-sister Laura Herlitzka was born in Buenos Aires.

He studied at the Massimo D'Azeglio high school in Turin and enrolled in literature at the University of Turin, but soon moved to Rome to live with his father, who had become a gallery owner there. He studied under Orazio Costa at the National Academy of Dramatic Arts. In the 2002–2003 and 2003–2004 theater seasons he won the Ubu award as best Italian actor. In 2004 he was awarded a Nastro d'argento as best actor and a David di Donatello as best supporting actor for his performance as Aldo Moro in Marco Bellocchio's film Good Morning, Night (which also earned him the Horcynus Orca award for four years later), and received the Gassman Award as best actor for the theatrical performances Let Me Go Mother and Lighea. In 2013, at the fourth edition of the Bari International Film Festival, he obtained again the Gassman Award for being the best leading actor for the film The Red and the Blue.

Herlitzka died in Rome on 31 July 2024, at the age of 86. His health declined after his wife's death a few months earlier.

== Partial filmography ==
- Love and Anarchy (1973) - Pautasso
- Black Holiday (1973) - Guasco
- Morel's Invention (1974) - Ospite che si scusa
- Seven Beauties (1975) - Socialist
- A Joke of Destiny (1983) - Dr. Crisafulli, segretario
- Il giocatore invisibile (1985)
- Summer Night (1986) - Salvatore Cantalamessa aka Turi
- Dark Eyes (1987) - L'Avvocato
- The Gold Rimmed Glasses (1987)
- Secondo Ponzio Pilato (1987) - Barabba
- The Mask (1988) - Elia
- Traces of an Amorous Life (1990) - Teacher
- In the Name of the Sovereign People (1990) - Giuseppe Gioacchino Belli
- Marcellino (1991) - Il precettore
- The Butterfly's Dream (1994) - Il padre
- The Favourite Son (1994) - Raphaël, le père
- Intolerance (1996) - (segment "Ottantanni di Intolerance")
- Les Démons de Jésus (1997) - Raymond Piacentini
- Marianna Ucrìa (1997) - Duca Pietro
- A ridosso dei ruderi, i Trionfi (1997)
- Mille bornes (1999) - Le père
- Il corpo dell'anima (1999) - Ernesto
- Il mnemonista (2000) - Professor L.
- L'ultima lezione (2000) - Federico Caffè
- Quartetto (2001) - Paolo
- It's Easier for a Camel... (2003) - Father
- Le intermittenze del cuore (2003) - Carlo
- Good Morning, Night (2003) - Aldo Moro
- The Voyage Home (2004) - Protadio
- Secret Journey (2006) - Padre Angelo
- Boris (2007, TV series) - Orlando Serpentieri
- The Demons of St. Petersberg (2008) - Pavlovic
- All Human Rights for All (2008) - Tolik (segment "Art. 9") / Voce narrante (segment "Art. 11")
- Narciso, dietro i cannoni, davanti ai muli (2008) - Ciso
- Aria (2009) - Giovanni
- The Red Shadows (2009) - Sergio Siniscalchi
- Christine Cristina (2009) - Sartorius
- Gli anni verdi (2010) - Guru
- Sette opere di misericordia (2011) - Antonio
- The Last Earthling (2011) - Padre di Luca
- Rien Va (2011) - Alessandro Tommasi
- The Ideal City (2012) - Custode Maneggio
- Dormant Beauty (2012) - Lo psichiatra
- The Red and the Blue (2012) - Prof. Fiorito
- The Great Beauty (2013) - Cardinal Bellucci
- Io, Arlecchino (2014) - Giovanni
- Blood of My Blood (2015) - Conte
- Sweet Dreams (2016) - padre Ettore Abisso
- Non c'è più religione (2016) - Bishop
- Veleni (2017) - Rettore
- Loro (2018) - Crepuscolo
- Primula Rossa (2018) - Cristiano
- Magical Nights (2018) - Fulvio Zappellini
- The Name of the Rose (2019, TV Series) - Alinardo da Grottaferrata
- Il processo (2019, TV Series)
- Citizens of the World (2019)
- The Hidden Child (2021)
