= I, the Other =

- Theatrical release poster
- Directed by: Mohsen Melliti
- Written by: David Colantoni; Sigalot Alessandro; Saverio Di Biagio
- Produced by: Aldo Arcangioli; Raoul Bova
- Starring: Raoul Bova; Giovanni Martorana
- Cinematography: Maurizio Calvesi
- Production companies: Trees Pictures; Sanmarco; Minollo Film; Passworld
- Distributed by: 20th Century Fox
- Release dates: 27 December 2006 (Capri Hollywood Film Festival); 18 May 2007 (Italy)
- Running time: 78 minutes
- Country: Italy
- Language: Italian

I, the Other (Italian: Io, l'altro, also known as Me, The Other) is a 2007 Italian drama film about two fishermen, directed by Mohsen Melliti. The film won three Italian Golden Globes, for best first work, best actor (to Raoul Bova), and best cinematography.

== Cast ==
Actor	Role
Raoul Bova	Giuseppe
Giovanni Martorana	Yousef
Mario Pupella	Troina
Samia Zibidi	Yousef's Mother
Lina Besrat Assefa	Giovane Africana
Mohammed Alì	Young Yousef

== Plot ==
Giuseppe (Raoul Bova) and Yousef (Giovanni Martorana) are two fishermen bound by a long friendship. Giuseppe, an Italian, and Yousef, an Arab, both work together on the same boat. Out at sea, the two share everything, even the same first name.

One day, Giuseppe hears a disturbing report on the ship's radio. The report is a warning about a suspected terrorist who happens to have the same name as Giuseppe's trusted partner: Yousef Ben Ali. Giuseppe suspects that he is being double-crossed by his once faithful friend.

A cat-and-mouse game ensues, as the two try to outwit each other aboard the ship, alone in the middle of the sea.

== Filming location ==
The entire film was filmed off the coast of Ponza, the largest of the Pontine Islands.

== See also ==
- Movies about immigration to Italy
