= Bartali: The Iron Man =

2006 Italian television film

- Written by: Giancarlo Governi; Massimiliano Governi; Alberto Negrin; Andrea Porporati
- Directed by: Alberto Negrin
- Starring: Pierfrancesco Favino; Nicole Grimaudo
- Composer: Ennio Morricone
- Original language: Italian

Production
- Cinematography: Enrico Lucidi
- Editor: Antonio Siciliano
- Running time: 100 minutes

Original release
- Network: Rai 1
- Release: 2006

Bartali: The Iron Man (Italian: Gino Bartali - L'intramontabile) is a 2006 Italian television film co-written and directed by Alberto Negrin.

The film depicts real life events of road racing cyclist Gino Bartali, and particularly his rivality with Fausto Coppi.

== Plot ==
=== First Episode ===
The story begins with a young Gino Bartali in his hometown (Ponte a Ema, near Florence), where he cultivates his passion for cycling alongside his brother Giulio Bartali. Gino comes from a poor farming family and initially faces conflict with his father, who stresses the necessity of working to earn a living. Once he finally gets his father’s permission, Bartali starts participating in cycling races, winning all the most important prizes.

Impeccable in terms of character, very religious, and driven by a deep love for his family and his brother—his companion in his sporting passion—Bartali never leaves Giulio behind, determined to share the fate of a professional cyclist with him. During a race, due to an approaching car, Giulio is struck and dies in a tragic accident. The loss of his brother becomes a deep, unhealed wound in Bartali’s soul, and he immediately decides to stop racing and withdraw into a convent to work, remaining with his pain.

It is Adriana, a young shop assistant in a fabric store, whom Bartali has fallen in love with and whose father has given him permission to court her, who travels to the convent with her bicycle to convince him to move forward with his life and continue racing. Bartali then agrees to continue his career but makes a secret vow: he will not see his beloved again until he has won the Tour de France for his brother, the world’s most important race. Only after winning the race and visiting his brother’s grave to dedicate both the pink and yellow jerseys to him, will Bartali return to his future wife, Adriana.

Meanwhile, brothers Fausto and Serse Coppi begin to make their way into the world of professional cycling, until Bartali recruits the young, promising Fausto as his teammate. It is Bartali who imparts to Fausto Coppi the strength necessary to persevere, a strength that will eventually lead the young rider to win his first Giro d'Italia in 1940. A rivalry begins that will follow the two champions throughout their lives, influenced also by the outbreak of World War II.

During the war, racing ceases. Coppi is sent to Africa, and Bartali remains in Florence, actively participating in the Resistance, but not with weapons: exposing himself to great risk, he offers a precious contribution by transporting hidden documents inside his bicycle, on behalf of his friend, Cardinal Elia Dalla Costa.

Bartali is arrested for desertion and subversive activities by the fascist police, suspicious of a letter from the cardinal thanking the cyclist for “the donated vegetables,” a clear coded message of thanks for the contribution Bartali was making to the resistance. Bartali’s precious bicycle is taken from him, and he is sentenced to be executed by firing squad.

=== Second Episode ===
Adriana, unaware of her husband’s role in the resistance, goes in search of him and discovers his arrest. The arrival of the Allied forces in Florence forces the Black Brigades to flee, and Bartali is freed. The end of the war marks the new beginning for racing: the rivalry between Bartali and Coppi is now evident, especially after Coppi leaves Legnano and participates in the 1946 Giro d'Italia with Bianchi. The age difference between the two disadvantages Bartali due to the years lost during the war, but the champion’s tenacity keeps the competition open and full of possibilities.

In the Giro d'Italia, Coppi returns the favor to Bartali, who had helped and encouraged him at the start of his career. In fact, Bartali had decided to withdraw from the Giro due to the ban on participating in the 1946 Tour de Suisse, the prize money for which he desperately needed, especially with the post-war difficulties. The decision is reversed, Bartali doesn’t withdraw from the Giro, and he wins the pink jersey, narrowly beating Coppi, who is worthy of understanding and helping his friend-rival.

The time for the Tour de France arrives: Bartali participates, while Coppi, affected by the presence of his rival, decides to stay in Italy. Gino achieves the unexpected feat and wins the Tour de France, becoming a significant figure in keeping the country united and helping it overcome the difficult post-assassination crisis of Palmiro Togliatti, leader of the PCI. Coppi faces difficulties, and under pressure from his cycling team, the possibility of excluding Bartali from the following year’s Tour emerges, a race Coppi also wishes to participate in.

After a tough meeting between the president of Bianchi, Coppi, Bartali, and Alfredo Binda (team manager for the Tour), it is decided to let the two cyclists race on equal terms, agreeing to help each other with mutual respect. This decision prevents a repeat of the earlier incident at the World Championships, where Coppi and Bartali had neutralized each other due to their heated rivalry.

The two alternate for years between victories and glories. Bartali launches his own cycling team, leaving Legnano, his friend Eberardo Pavesi’s team, and Coppi wins the Tour de France but chooses to share his triumph with the Tuscan. Bartali’s career slowly comes to an end, as age and a severe car accident impair him for good: he will attend the World Championships as a guest and Italian representative but will not participate (the title is won by Coppi). After retiring, Bartali becomes the director of a team whose captain will be none other than the younger Coppi, who is hounded by the press over his extramarital affair with Giulia Occhini, nicknamed "The White Lady," with whom he also has a child, but is apparently understood more than anyone else by Bartali.

Moved, Coppi invites Bartali for a hunting trip in Africa, but he declines. It is in Africa that Coppi contracts malaria from an insect bite; the disease, diagnosed too late and improperly treated, proves fatal. Bartali passes away on May 5, 2000, closing a sensational and unforgettable chapter in sports, life, and Italian history.

== Cast ==
- Pierfrancesco Favino as Gino Bartali
- Nicole Grimaudo as Adriana Bani Bartali
- Simone Gandolfo as Fausto Coppi
- Francesco Salvi as Eberardo Pavesi
- Rodolfo Corsato as Alfredo Binda
- Carlo Giuffrè as Cardinal Elia Dalla Costa
- Edoardo Gabbriellini as Giulio Bartali
- Giuseppe Gandini as Berti
- Emilio Bonucci as Signor Zambrini
- Franco Castellano as Mario Carità
- Gianna Giachetti as Giulia Bartali
- Sandro Ghiani as Amedeo Bani
- Christian Ginepro as Aldo Bini
- Edoardo Natoli as Giorgio Bani
- Bruno Vetti as Torello Bartali
- Stefano Brusa as Serse Coppi
- Enrica Rosso as Cesarina Bani
- Valentina Bruscoli as Giulia Occhini
- Vittorio Amandola as Father Berti
- Pierre Lucat as Louison Bobet
