= Linda Caridi =

Italian actress (born 1988)

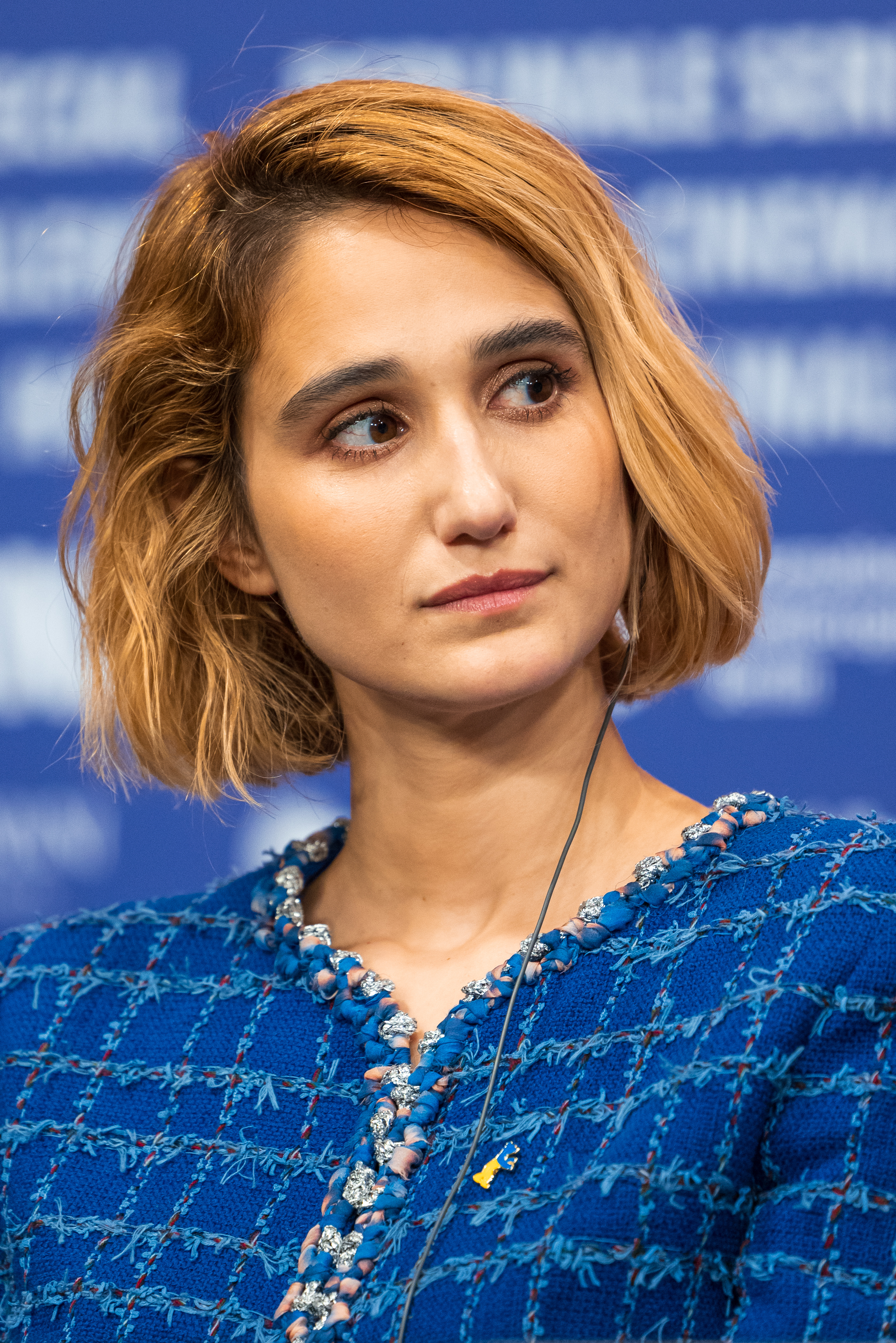
- Caridi at the 73rd Berlin International Film Festival (2023)
- Born: 11 April 1988 (age 38); Milan, Italy
- Occupation: Actress

Linda Caridi (born 11 April 1988) is an Italian television, stage and film actress.

== Life and career ==
Born in Milan into a family of Sicilian and Calabrian origins, Caridi graduated from the Paolo Grassi Drama School and started her career on stage, in which she was among the co-founders of the theatrical company "The Baby Walk". She had her breakout in 2015, when she played poet Antonia Pozzi in the biographical film Antonia.

For her performance in the 2018 film Remember?, Caridi won the NuovoImaie Talent Award at the 75th Venice International Film Festival and received a David di Donatello nomination for best actress. In 2023, she received a Nastro d'Argento nomination for best actress for her performance in Last Night of Amore.

== Filmography ==
=== Film ===
Year	Title	Role	Notes
2010	The Santa Claus Gang	Anna	
2015	Antonia	Antonia Pozzi	
2018	A Woman's Name	Cecilia	
2018	Remember?	Her	
2018	Mom + Mom	Karole	
2020	The Ties	Lidia	
2021	Superheroes	Tullia	
2022	Diabolik: Ginko Attacks!	Elena Vanel	
2023	Last Night of Amore	Viviana	
2024	Sei fratelli	Giorgia	

=== Television ===
Year	Title	Role	Notes
2015	Lea	Denise Cosco	Television movie
2019	Storia di Nilde	Rosanna	Television movie
2021	Cacciatore: The Hunter	Paola Romano	8 episodes
2024	Supersex	Tina	Episode: "L'isola"
