= El Alamein: The Line of Fire =

El Alamein - The Line of Fire
- Theatrical release poster
- Directed by: Enzo Monteleone
- Written by: Enzo Monteleone
- Produced by: Marco Chimenz; Giovanni Stabilini; Riccardo Tozzi
- Starring: Paolo Briguglia; Emilio Solfrizzi; Pierfrancesco Favino
- Cinematography: Daniele Nannuzzi
- Edited by: Cecilia Zanuso
- Music by: Pivio and Aldo De Scalzi
- Production companies: Cattleya; Ministero per i Beni e le Attività Culturali (MiBAC)
- Distributed by: Medusa Distribuzione
- Release date: 2002
- Running time: 117 minutes
- Country: Italy
- Language: Italian

El Alamein - The Line of Fire (Italian: El Alamein - La linea del fuoco, also known as El Alamein: Bond of Honour) is a 2002 Italian war-drama film written and directed by Enzo Monteleone. The film won three David di Donatello awards (for best cinematography, best editing and best sound), a Nastro d'Argento for best sound and a Globo d'oro for best new actor (to Paolo Briguglia). The film is set during the Second Battle of El Alamein, which is seen from the Italian perspective.

== Plot ==
The film opens in October 1942, when young Private Serra (Paolo Briguglia), a university student from Palermo who has volunteered for the Army, is sent to join his assignment in the 28th Infantry Regiment of the 17th Infantry Division Pavia, deployed near Naqb Rala (El Alamein). Due to Fascist propaganda, he is convinced that Alexandria will be conquered soon, and the Axis advance into Egypt will end in victory.

His certainties, however, soon start to crumble when he is confronted with the grim reality of the life in the trenches during the desert war. Lieutenant Fiore (Emilio Solfrizzi), the platoon commander, is unimpressed by Serra's enthusiasm, and shows little faith in the prospect of a rapid victory; as soon as Serra reaches his squad, the corporal who has accompanied him is killed by an artillery shell, and all is left of him is an ear. Serra befriends some members of his platoon, Private Spagna (Luciano Scarpa), Corporal De Vita (Thomas Trabacchi), mortar-man Tarozzi (Piero Maggiò) and especially Sergeant Rizzo (Pierfrancesco Favino), his squad commander, a Venetian veteran who has been in Africa for two years; they tell him that each soldier has three "miracles" to spend, before dying. Serra's first "miracle" has been escaping unharmed the shelling that killed the corporal, while they have long spent their "miracles". The time at the front line passes among many hardships: the heat is unbearable, dysentery is rampant, the food is scarce, the little water available tastes like fuel oil; British artillery shells the Italian positions by day, only giving some rest at night, and vipers and scorpions add to the danger represented by the enemy.

One day, a British sniper, lying in ambush behind the wreck of a vehicle, shoots two soldiers, and when two stretcher-bearers try to rescue them, they are shot as well, before Tarozzi kills the sniper with his mortar. On the following night, a British vehicle blows up a mine in the no man's land, and Serra, Rizzo, De Vita and Spagna loot the corpses to retrieve some food. Serra steps on a mine, but it turns out to be an anti-tank mine, calibrated for a much higher weight; his second "miracle".

Two trucks, having lost their way, reach the platoon; Lt. Fiore inspects them and finds out that their cargo consists of boxes of shoe polish and Mussolini's horse, in preparation for "the parade in Alexandria". Fiore angrily tells the driver that, if they want to conquer Alexandria, they need to send them weapons, water, ammunition, food, medicines and fresh troops; Tarozzi suggests to kill and eat the horse and Fiore agrees, but nobody feels like killing it, so they let the trucks go with the horse.

Serra, Rizzo, Spagna and De Vita are sent to pick up a truckload of water, 60 km behind their lines. The truck driver ironically remarks that they should be given grappa instead, joking that this is what led to the Italian victory on the Piave river during World War I. On the way back to the frontline, Serra and the others take a detour, and they reach the coast, where they take a bath in the sea and then rest on the beach, before being discovered by sentries who tell them that they have run through a minefield.

During the following night, while they are on watch, Rizzo tells Serra about how he was captured after the fall of Bengasi, but evaded captivity and hid for three months in a brothel of Bengasi, before rejoining his company when the city was retaken by Axis forces. He states that being a prisoner is a no-life and shameful for a soldier, and, as he had said previously, that he will not surrender again.

Serra discovers a camel near the trenches; he kills it and the carcass is slaughtered and cooked, allowing the soldiers to eat fresh meat for the first time in months, but when Lt. Fiore is informed, he calls for an Engineer unit: the animal has been sent by the British to clear a path through the Italian minefields, as is confirmed by the engineers. The engineers inform Fiore and his men that, according to information from the command, the Allied offensive is about to start; they have been finding de-mined areas all along the front.

Serra and Sgt. Rizzo are sent on a mission to the Qattara Depression, with orders to discover why a Bersaglieri outpost has ceased all communications; they find that the squad manning the outpost has been entirely killed. They bury the bodies and they return to their lines. A British artillery bombardment kills or wounds over twenty members of the platoon; De Vita survives unscathed a shell that lands near him, but afterwards he starts behaving strangely, slowly losing his mind.

When the battle begins, Lt. Fiore's platoon is ordered to take position along the defense line, at "Height 105" (as a reinforcement to the Ruspoli Group of the 185th Infantry Division "Folgore"), placing themselves in holes dug in the ground, with mortars and machine guns. During the following night, their positions are subjected to heavy artillery shelling, and then assaulted by Allied tanks and infantry. The Italians respond with mortars, rifles and machine guns, and both sides suffer heavy casualties; Tarozzi is wounded in an eye, and De Vita, who occupies the same hole as Serra, snaps and climbs out of the hole, starting to walk apathetically; despite Serra's calls for him to come back, he keeps walking until he disappears amid clouds of sand.

The British attack manages to breach the first line, but it is stopped by artillery and minefields, and then repelled ("maybe this was the third miracle", Serra later tells himself). On the following morning, Serra wanders around the battlefield, littered with corpses of Italian and British soldiers; he remembers that at school he was told that "lucky is he who dies a hero", but, whilst looking at the corpses scattered on the ground, he reflects "I have seen many of these heroes: they are neither lucky nor unlucky: they are just dead. They rot at the bottom of a pit, without a shred of poetry. Death is only beautiful in schoolbooks: in real life it is pitiful, horrendous, and it stinks". Serra finds Spagna, who has been mortally wounded in the stomach and is being carried away on a stretcher; he, Fiore and Rizzo try to comfort him by lying and saying that, now that he has been wounded, he will go home.

At first, the orders are to hold the line at all costs, "Win or die"; after a few days, however, Lt. Fiore's platoon is ordered to retreat to Qaret el Khadim, and starts a long march through the desert. During the march, a column of retreating German vehicles passes by without stopping; a German soldier warns the Italians that they "will die here". An overloaded Italian truck also passes by, again refusing to take anyone on board.

They encounter a general (Silvio Orlando), who is burying his orderly, killed by an air strike. The general refuses any help, and is left alone; later, at sunset, he finishes burying his orderly and then commits suicide by shooting himself in the head. The platoon reaches Qaret el Khadim, but only finds a field hospital; a medical officer (Giuseppe Cederna) informs them that the new orders are to retreat to Fuka and says that he will wait for the Allies to come, because they will have better means to care for the wounded. The platoon manages to board a truck, but while on the road they are attacked and strafed by a Supermarine Spitfire; they stop near a shelter, push aside the sentries trying to stop them, and take shelter inside, finding there a colonel (Roberto Citran) who says that their retreat is a "strategic disengaging manoeuvre" and that "reinforcements will come". When they leave the shelter after the raid has ended, they discover that their truck has been destroyed.

Lt. Fiore's platoon begin once more their march in the midst of the desert. A sudden cloudburst gives some relief to the dehydrated men. They encounter a bersagliere on a motorcycle, who tells them that the British forces have already occupied Fuka, and the order is now to retreat to Marsa Matruh – 100 more kilometres on foot through the desert. The platoon settles near an old cemetery for the night. During the following night, however, some Bren carriers find them, and capture all the survivors except for Fiore, Rizzo, and Serra, who have placed themselves farther away, and are not noticed.

In the morning, the three start up again their march, but Fiore is weakened by an untreated wound, and can barely walk. They reach some vehicles abandoned in the desert; a truck turns out to be unusable, but Serra manages to power up a motorcycle. Fiore is in too bad a shape to get on the motorcycle, so he tells Rizzo and Serra to leave him and save themselves. Rizzo, however, decides not to abandon Fiore; when Serra says that he won't go without them, Rizzo forces him to leave. Serra promises that he will find a vehicle and come back for them, then he departs. The film closes on Serra riding away on the motorcycle, while Rizzo waves him farewell and watches as he disappears in the distance.

A final sequence informs about the Battle of El Alamein and is followed by images of the Italian War Memorial at El Alamein. Here, an aged Serra watches the tombs of Rizzo, Fiore, Spagna and De Vita.

Inaccuracies

In the film the Italian soldiers refer to the artillery shelling them as "English 88s". This has been seen as an error, as the famous WW2 88mm gun was the German anti-aircraft gun of that calibre. However, the British 25-pounder field gun also fired shells of 88mm calibre, so the film is in fact correct.

The armoured vehicles used in the film are generally anachronistic, though most of them are both disguised to a degree and seen at night. An exception is a US White M3 half-track pretending, as in many movies, to be a German half-track. The soft-skinned vehicles in the film are generally more accurate, and overall the period detail is very good.

== Cast ==
- Paolo Briguglia: Soldier Serra
- Emilio Solfrizzi: Lt. Fiore
- Pierfrancesco Favino: Sgt. Rizzo
- Luciano Scarpa: Soldier Spagna
- Thomas Trabacchi: Cpr. De Vita
- Giuseppe Cederna: Capt. Medician
- Roberto Citran: the Colonel
- Silvio Orlando: the General
