= Stories of Love That Cannot Belong to This World =

2017 film

- Directed by: Francesca Comencini
- Screenplay by: Francesca Comencini; Francesca Manieri; Laura Paolucci
- Produced by: Domenico Procacci
- Starring: Lucia Mascino; Thomas Trabacchi
- Cinematography: Valerio Azzali
- Edited by: Ilaria Fraioli
- Music by: Valerio Vigliar; Giovanni Truppi
- Distributed by: Warner Bros. Italia
- Release date: 2017
- Language: Italian

Stories of Love That Cannot Belong to This World (Italian: Amori che non sanno stare al mondo) is a 2017 romance film co-written and directed by Francesca Comencini.

== Cast ==
- Lucia Mascino as Claudia
- Thomas Trabacchi as Flavio
- Valentina Bellè as Nina
- Carlotta Natoli as Diana
- Camilla Semino Favro as Giorgia
- Iaia Forte as Mara Semeraro

== Release ==
The film premiered at the 70th Locarno Film Festival. It had its national premiere at the 35th Torino Film Festival. It was released on Italian cinemas on 29 November 2017.

== Reception ==
On the review aggregator website Rotten Tomatoes, 40% of 5 critics' reviews are positive. The film received three Nastro d'Argento nominations, for the acting performances by Lucia Mascino and Thomas Trabacchi and for the original song "Amori che non sanno stare al mondo".
