= The Hidden Child (film) =

2021 Italian film

- Directed by: Roberto Andò
- Screenplay by: Roberto Andò; Franco Marcoaldi
- Starring: Silvio Orlando
- Cinematography: Maurizio Calvesi
- Edited by: Esmeralda Calabria
- Release date: 2021
- Language: Italian

The Hidden Child (Italian: Il bambino nascosto) is a 2021 Italian crime drama film written and directed by Roberto Andò, and based on his own novel with the same name.

The film was the closing film of the 78th edition of the Venice Film Festival, in which it was screened out of competition.

== Plot ==
Gabriele Santoro (Silvio Orlando) is a piano teacher; a bachelor from a well-off family, he lives alone, completely absorbed in music and in the arts, in a flat in the popular areas of Naples, in spite of the fact that he could actually afford much better. One day, a boy named Ciro (Giuseppe Pirozzi) from a neighbouring family furtively sneaks into his flat in order to hide from local mobsters, who are after him since, together with a friend, he dared to rob the wife of a local mob boss. The professor, realizing the danger the boy is in, hides him in his own flat, and by doing so puts himself at great danger. The two, coming from very different social classes, face a difficult co-habitation, exacerbated by the low opinion that Ciro has of the professor, but slowly start to reconcile their differences and build a durable bond.

== Cast ==
- Silvio Orlando as Prof. Gabriele Santoro
- Giuseppe Pirozzi as Ciro
- Lino Musella as Diego
- Gianfelice Imparato as Renato Santoro
- Roberto Herlitzka as Massimo Santoro
- Francesco Di Leva as Biagio
- Imma Villa as Angela Acerno
- Salvatore Striano as Carmine Acerno
- Tonino Taiuti as Nunzio
- Enzo Casertano as D'Alterio
