= Banat (film) =

Banat (The Journey)
- Directed by: Adriano Valerio
- Written by: Adriano Valerio; Ezio Abbate
- Starring: Edoardo Gabbriellini; Elena Radonicich
- Cinematography: Jonathan Ricquebourg
- Music by: Assen Avramov
- Release date: September 4, 2015 (Venice Film Festival)
- Running time: 82 minutes
- Language: Italian

Banat (The Journey), originally titled Banat (Il viaggio), is a 2015 Italian-Romanian-Bulgarian-Macedonian drama film written and directed by Adriano Valerio, at his feature film debut. It premiered in the International Critics’ Week section at the 72nd edition of the Venice Film Festival.

== Plot ==
Ivo, an agronomist from Brindisi and with no job opportunities, agrees to move to Banat, a region of Romania, where he has just been hired by local farmers. Here he will be joined by Clara, a boat restorer, met just before leaving Italy. The two will embark on a journey to rediscover themselves that will lead them to discover new horizons.

== Cast ==
- Edoardo Gabbriellini as Ivo
- Elena Radonicich as Clara
- Stefan Velniciuc as Ion
- Piera Degli Esposti as Miss Nitti
- Ovanes Torosian as Christian

== Production ==
Elena Radonicich was five months pregnant in real life during filming, so the director changed part of the story and adapted the character to the actress.

== See also ==
- List of Italian films of 2015
