= Julius Caesar (miniseries) =

2002 miniseries

- Written by: Peter Pruce; Craig Warner
- Directed by: Uli Edel
- Starring: Jeremy Sisto; Richard Harris; Christopher Walken; Valeria Golino; Chris Noth; Pamela Bowen
- Countries of origin: United States, Italy, Netherlands, Germany
- Original language: English

Production
- Producers: Jonas Bauer; Russell Kagan; Piria Paolo
- Running time: 178 minutes

Original release
- Network: TNT
- Release: June 29 – June 30, 2003

Julius Caesar is a 2002 miniseries about the life of Julius Caesar. It was directed by German director Uli Edel and written by Peter Pruce and Craig Warner. It is a dramatization of the life of Caesar from 82 BC to his death in 44 BC. It was one of the last two films starring Richard Harris, released in the year of his death. The series was originally broadcast on German TV in December 2002 before being broadcast on TNT in two parts, airing June 29 and 30, 2003, with the tagline "His Time Has Come". The miniseries was nominated for two Primetime Emmys for Outstanding Makeup for a Miniseries and Outstanding Sound Editing at the 56th Primetime Emmy Awards. It also has a full movie video release, combining the two episodes into one movie.

== Plot ==
The series begins in 82 BC when Julius Caesar is 18 years old. He is out in the town with his daughter Julia when news comes that Sulla is outside Rome with his army. The guards sent with the news post death lists on the Senate door. When Caesar sees that his father-in-law is on the list, he tries to rescue him only to be arrested by an officer of Sulla's army, Pompey. Caesar's mother, Aurelia, asks Sulla to show him mercy; out of respect for her, he promises to let Caesar live if he divorces his wife Cornelia, but Caesar refuses. Sulla then releases him anyway but orders Pompey to carve out his heart so that it may be presented publicly. Pompey defies the order, sending Caesar into exile from the Roman Republic and presenting his superior with a swine's heart.

Caesar is kidnapped by pirates while sailing into exile. When the sailors sent to ask his family for ransom fail to return, the pirates plan to kill him. Caesar bargains to fight one of them for an extra day and wins, then has a seizure; the pirates are about to throw him into the sea just as a ship arrives with the ransom money. With Sulla having recently died, Caesar is free to resume his political career. While he was gone Cornelia falls ill and Julia befriends Portia, daughter of Caesar's rival Marcus Porcius Cato, her brother Marcus and their cousin Brutus.

When Cornelia dies from her illness, Caesar swears at her funeral that he will become the great man she wished him to be. Around this time the same pirates who held him captive cut off the grain supply. The Senate send Pompey to deal with the problem after Caesar convinces them that he will not take the city with his army like Sulla did. Several years later, a victorious Pompey returns to Rome and learns that Caesar has been elected consul. On the day of Pompey's triumph, Julia, Portia and Marcus decide to go and Portia insists on dragging Brutus along with them. At the triumph, Caesar has another seizure but manages to hide his condition with the help of Calpurnia. At Pompey's welcoming party, while Pompey gets on well with Julia, Caesar notices Calpurnia who he doesn't remember from their encounter before.

Caesar tells his mother that he intends to follow Pompey's example and gain recognition through military service. Julia offers to help her father by marrying Pompey, thus binding the two men in alliance and compelling Pompey to give his new son-in-law control of his legions and logistics network. Despite his growing wariness towards Caesar's ambitions, Pompey permits Caesar to lead his forces in the conquest of Gaul. Calpurnia tells Caesar that she knows about his "falling sickness" and he confesses that it shames him. Before he goes to Gaul, Caesar marries Calpurnia and the two of them remain in contact through letters.

While sacking a town in Gaul, Caesar comes across a strong-willed warrior who refuses to give in to the Romans attacking his home. He tells Caesar his name is Vercingetorix. Caesar asks him why he is willing to die for something that will be destroyed no matter what, and the warrior replies, "because it is mine". Admiring his strength of will, Caesar gives him his finest horse and his freedom. However, Vercingetorix then leads a great army of Gauls against Caesar at the Battle of Alesia. Outnumbered and surrounded, Caesar's army nevertheless emerges victorious through his capable leadership.

Back in Rome, Julia dies in childbirth; with her death, Pompey no longer bothers to hide his contempt for Caesar. He allies with Cato to persuade the Senate that Caesar should be declared an enemy of Rome. Caesar's partisan Mark Antony attempts to defend his patron, but his dismissive and arrogant behavior towards the Senate results in his being dismissed. Pompey gathers the support of his fellow "Optimates" to build military strength while Cato obtains passage of a Senatorial decree ordering Caesar to surrender his generalship before entering Rome. Joined by Antony and other allies, Caesar instead crosses the Rubicon with his men and marches on Rome.

Pompey, Cato and Brutus flee the city and gather their forces in Greece. Caesar compels the Senate to appoint him dictator. He then crushes the Optimate armies at the Battle of Pharsalus, but Pompey escapes to Egypt. Caesar pardons the captured soldiers of Pompey, including Brutus, to whom he says that if anyone wants peace, they shall have it. Pompey arrives in Alexandria and is immediately killed on the orders of the boy king Ptolemy XIII. When Caesar arrives, he is given Pompey's head as a gift but is visibly angered. Cleopatra VII seduces Caesar and manipulates his anger by persuading him to depose Ptolemy and install her as ruler of Egypt. Going on to Utica to find Cato and his son, Caesar wins the Battle of Thapsus. Cato refuses to beg for Caesar's pardon and commits suicide by falling on his sword.

With the civil war over, Caesar returns to Rome with his new ally Cleopatra and their son Caesarion. The senators become convinced that he plans to dissolve the Republic and declare himself king. Cassius, the principal mover of the plot, convinces his brother-in-law Brutus to join them as Brutus is known for his honesty. Calpurnia has a dream about Caesar's death and begs him not to attend the Senate that day, but he ignores her advice. When he takes his seat on the Ides of March, the plotting senators mob Caesar, stab him several times and then flee from the building. Calpurnia learns of the plot from Brutus's wife Portia and rushes to the Senate to find him dying alone on the floor.

== Cast ==
- Jeremy Sisto as Julius Caesar, second Dictator for Life
- Richard Harris as Lucius Sulla, Rome's strongman who disliked Caesar but ultimately paved the way for his dictatorship
- Christopher Walken as Cato the Younger, ardent Republican who fought Caesar in the Senate and the battlefield
- Valeria Golino as Calpurnia, final wife of Julius Caesar
- Christopher Noth as Pompey the Great, Rome's greatest General outdone by Caesar
- Pamela Bowen as Aurelia, Caesar's mother
- Heino Ferch as Vercingetorix, Chief of the Arverni tribe of the Gauls who tried to stop Caesar's Gallic War
- Tobias Moretti as Gaius Cassius, led Pompey's fleet in Caesar's Civil War and prime plotter of Caesar's murder
- Samuela Sardo as Cleopatra, Queen of Egypt and lover of Caesar
- Daniela Piazza as Cornelia, wife of Caesar and mother of Julia
- Nicole Grimaudo as Julia, daughter of Caesar, wife of Pompey and dies after her son is born
- Sean Pertwee as Titus Labienus, a lieutenant under Caesar; he defected to Pompey once he knew Caesar was marching on Rome and died in the Battle of Munda, the last battle of the war
- Paolo Briguglia as Marcus Cato, son of Cato
- Kate Steavenson-Payne as Portia, wife of Brutus
- Ian Duncan as Brutus, Senator and friend of Caesar who is the most famous for turning on Caesar and participating in his murder
- Jay Rodan as Mark Antony, a cousin, friend, and military commander of Caesar who would eventually get revenge on Caesar's murderers
- Christian Kohlund as Lepidus, Caesar's best supporter in the Senate who allied with Mark Antony after his murder
- David Foxxe as Pothinus, regent of King Ptolemy XIII
- Anna Cachia as Atilia, wife of Cato and mother of Marcus Cato
- Christopher Ettridge as Apollonius Molon, Greek philosopher and teacher
- Colin Maher as Casca, Senator who was actually the first man to stab Caesar
- Brendan Hooper as Bibulus, son in-law to Cato who fought against Caesar in the war
- John Suda as Tillius, Senator and assassin of Caesar
- Chris Gatt as Ligarius, Senator and conspirator
- Clive Merrison as Metellus, Senator killed by Sulla as an example to the others
- Denys Hawthorne as Spurinna, soothsayer who warned Caesar of the Ides of March
- Manuel Cauchi as Cinna, Caesar's father-in-law, anachronistically killed in Sulla's purge (the real Cinna was murdered by his own soldiers before Sulla's return)

== Production ==
Filming took place in Malta and Bulgaria.

== Home media ==
The miniseries was released on DVD in 2004 in the United States and in 2005 in the United Kingdom. The DVD contains a making-of featurette.

== See also ==
- List of historical drama films
- List of films set in ancient Rome
- 1st century BC
- First Triumvirate
- Gallic Wars
- Caesar's Civil War
