= Camilla Semino Favro =

Italian actress (born 1986)

- Born: 16 August 1986 (age 40); Torre del Greco, Italy
- Occupation: Actress
- Years active: 2009–present

Camilla Semino Favro (born 16 August 1986) is an Italian actress.

== Early life and career ==
She was born in 1986 in Torre del Greco but grew up in Genoa. After obtaining the classical high school diploma at the Liceo Andrea D'Oria she moved to Milan to attend the acting school of the Piccolo Teatro directed by Luca Ronconi. In 2008 she got her diploma.

After her debut in the theater at the age of 22, she ventured on the stages of Rome, Turin and Milan in numerous representations taken from the works of Carlo Goldoni, Federico García Lorca, William Shakespeare, Henrik Ibsen, Mark Ravenhill, Simon Stephens and Penelope Skinner. She works under the direction of Elio De Capitani, Ferdinando Bruni, Gabriele Lavia, Serena Sinigaglia, Mimmo Sorrentino, Massimo De Francovich, Emiliano Bronzino.

In 2009 she made her debut on Rai 1 interpreting the fiction Fuoriclasse directed by Riccardo Donna alongside Luciana Littizzetto and Neri Marcorè. She continues her experience on the small screen working on the set of Benvenuti a tavola - Nord vs Sud, with Giorgio Tirabassi and Fabrizio Bentivoglio, and Ris Roma 3, both directed by Francesco Miccichè.

In 2012 she starred alongside Vittoria Puccini in a miniseries Altri tempi as Edda, a girl from a brothel in the 1950s. The video clip of En and Xanax dates back to 2013, a single by the singer-songwriter Samuele Bersani. In the video, Camilla stars alongside actor Alessandro Sperduti.

Later she shot other TV series such as Le mani dentro la città and Una grande famiglia. In 2013 she was again on the set of L'assalto next to Diego Abatantuono. In 2015 she joined the cast of Thou Shalt Not Kill aired on Rai 3, a TV series much appreciated by critics. Her film debut came in 2012 with the film Diaz – Don't Clean Up This Blood by Daniele Vicari as a lawyer named Franci. In 2014 she took part in Nanni Moretti's film Mia Madre covering the role of the protagonist as a young woman in a flashback, a role played by Margherita Buy in the rest of the film.

In 2017 she joined the cast of the TV series 1993, covering the role of Eva.

== Filmography ==
=== Film ===
Year	Title	Role(s)	Notes
2012	Diaz – Don't Clean Up This Blood	Franci	
2014	Mia Madre	Young Margherita	
2017	Stories of Love That Cannot Belong to This World	Giorgia	
2019	Easy Living	Camilla	
2019	The Champion	Paola	
2023	Last Night of Amore	Daria Criscito	
2026	Io + te	Ginevra	

=== Television ===
Year	Title	Role(s)	Notes
2009	Don Matteo	Claudia Moresi	Episode: "Mai dire trenta"
2011	Fuoriclasse	Silvia Murialdi	Main role (season 1)
2012	Camera Café	Sofia	Episode: "Andrea poeta"
2012	Benvenuti a tavola	Viola Sabelli	Recurring role (season 1)
2012	R.I.S. Roma – Delitti imperfetti	Isabella	Recurring role (season 3)
2013	Una grande famiglia – 20 anni prima	Young Laura Rengoni	Television movie
2013	Altri tempi	Edda	Television movie
2014	Le mani dentro la città	Beatrice Giusti	Recurring role
2015	Thou Shalt Not Kill	Sister Chiara	Episode: "Episode 4"
2017	1993	Eva	Recurring role
2018	È arrivata la felicità	Caterina	2 episodes
2019	Mentre ero via	Ilaria Grossi	Main role
2021	Masantonio – Sezione scomparsi	Chiara Onofri	Episode: "Prima puntata"
2022	Vostro onore	Ludovica Renda	Main role
2022	Sopravvissuti	Marta	2 episodes
2023	There's No Place Like a Home: The Series	Rebecca	Recurring role (season 2)
