= Elena Semino =

British linguist

- Born: 9 September 1964 (age 61); Genoa, Italy
- Education: University of Genoa; Lancaster University
- Known for: Critical discourse analysis
- Spouse: Jonathan Culpeper
- Scientific career
- Fields: Stylistics; Critical discourse analysis
- Workplaces: Lancaster University
- Website: Semino on the website of Lancaster University

Elena Semino (born 9 September 1964) is an Italian-born British linguist whose research involves stylistics and metaphor theory. Focusing on figurative language in a range of poetic and prose works, most recently she has worked on topics from the domains of medical humanities and health communication. Her projects use corpus linguistic methods as well as qualitative analysis.

She served as head of the Department of Linguistics and English Language at Lancaster University from 2013 to 2019.

== Biography ==
Semino earned her BA in 1988 in Foreign Languages and Literature from the University of Genoa, Italy. She received her MA in 1990 and her PhD in 1994 from Lancaster University. She taught Italian as a foreign language at Napier Polytechnic (Edinburgh) and at Lancaster University, where in 1992 she took a position as lecturer in the Department of Linguistics and English Language. She became a senior Senior Lecturer in Linguistics there in 2003. She is currently a professor of Linguistics and Verbal Art and served as head of the Department of Linguistics and English Language between 2013 and 2019.

She serves on the editorial board of Critical Approaches to Discourse Analysis Across Disciplines and Metaphor and the Social World.

Semino has been a co-PI on grants from the UK's Economic and Social Research Council (ESRC) and the Brazilian research agency CONFAP to study the linguistic representation of urban violence in Brazil using corpus linguistics methods, and a project to funded by ESRC that details how metaphors are used in end-of-life care in the UK (MELC).

On 21 November 2018, Semino said that the academics at the University of Mosul are "working in conditions that we cannot even imagine" after the Department of Linguistics and English Language at Lancaster University facilitated to support the teaching of linguistics at Mosul, Iraq, providing mentoring for staff and students via video-conferencing, advice for PhD students and free access to an online course.

== Selected publications ==
- E. Semino. Metaphor in discourse. Cambridge University Press. 2008
- E. Semino and M. Short. Corpus stylistics: Speech, writing and thought presentation in a corpus of English writing. Routledge. 2004
- E. Semino, J. Heywood, M. Short. Methodological problems in the analysis of metaphors in a corpus of conversations about cancer. Journal of Pragmatics. 2004
- E. Seminno and J. Culpeper. Cognitive stylistics: Language and cognition in text analysis. John Benjamins. 2002
