= Roberto Andò =

Italian director, screenwriter, playwright and author

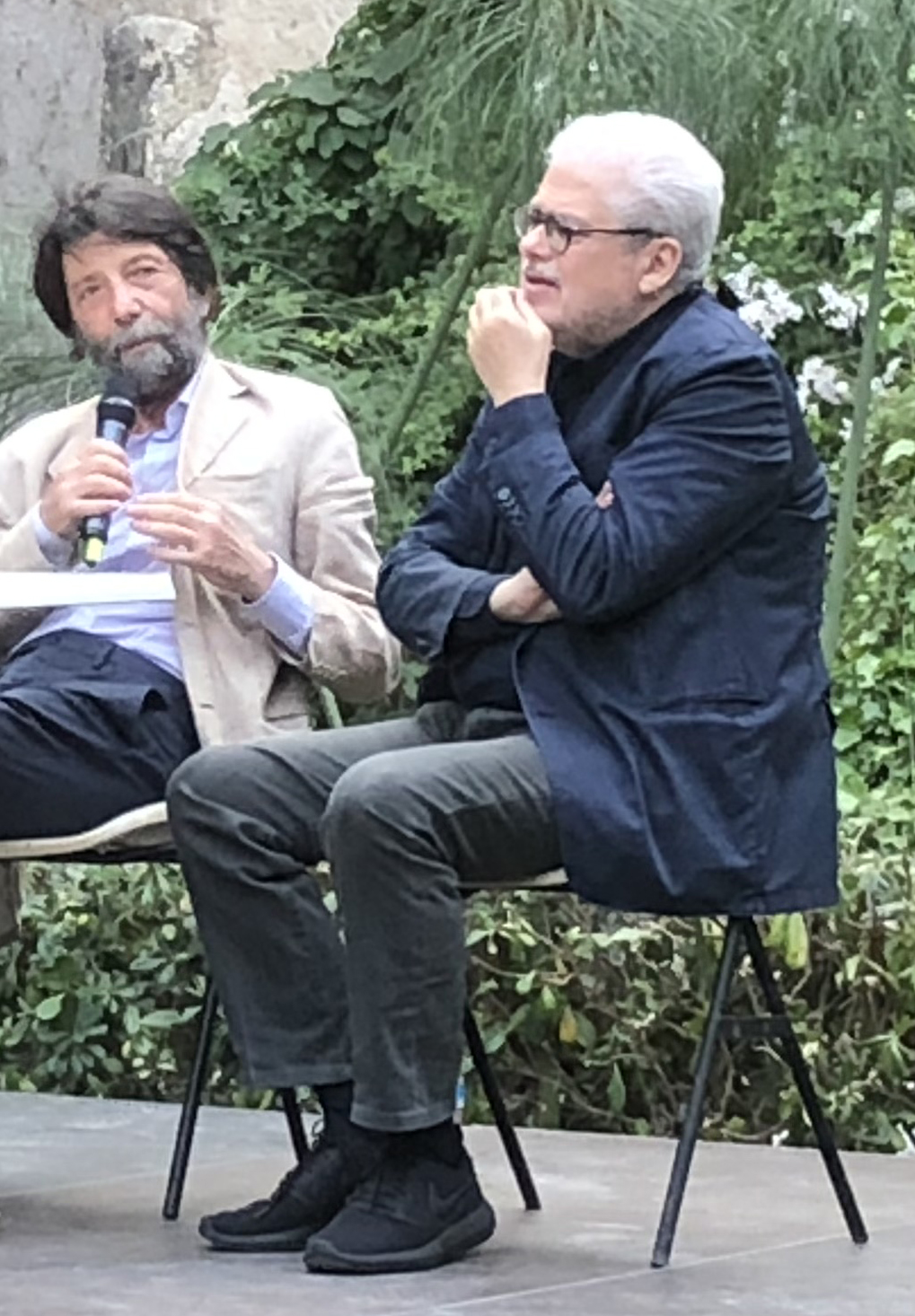
- Born: 11 January 1959 (age 67); Palermo, Italy
- Occupations: Film director and screenwriter

Roberto Andò (born 11 January 1959) is an Italian director, screenwriter, playwright and author.

== Life and career ==
Born in Palermo, Andò debuted as assistant director, working with Francis Ford Coppola, Federico Fellini, Michael Cimino and Francesco Rosi, among others. In 1986 he debuted on stage directing La foresta-radice- labirinto, a puppet theater work based on an Italo Calvino's original story and with puppets drawn by Renato Guttuso. After several documentary films, Andò made his feature debut film in 2000, with Il manoscritto del Principe, produced by Giuseppe Tornatore. His debut novel, Il trono vuoto, won the Campiello prize for best first work; from the novel he derived the film Viva la libertà, with whom he won the David di Donatello for Best Script and the Nastro d'Argento for Best Screenplay.

== Filmography ==
- The Prince's Manuscript (Il manoscritto del principe, 2000)
- Strange Crime (Sotto falso nome/Le prix du désir, 2004)
- Secret Journey (Viaggio segreto, 2006)
- Long Live Freedom (Viva la libertà, 2013)
- The Confessions (Le confessioni, 2016)
- The Stolen Caravaggio (Una storia senza nome, 2018)
- The Hidden Child (Il bambino nascosto, 2021)
- Strangeness (La stranezza, 2022)
- The Illusion (L'abbaglio, 2025)
