= List of Italian films of 1987 =

A list of films produced in Italy in 1987 (see 1987 in film):

Title	Director	Cast	Genre	Notes
1987
The Barbarians	Ruggero Deodato	the Barbarian Brothers (Peter and David Paul), Richard Lynch	Sword and sorcery film	
Bellifreschi	Enrico Oldoini	Lino Banfi, Christian De Sica, Lionel Stander	Comedy	
The Belly of an Architect	Peter Greenaway	Brian Dennehy, Chloe Webb	Drama	
Big Deal After 20 Years	Amanzio Todini	Marcello Mastroianni, Vittorio Gassman, Tiberio Murgia	Comedy	Sequel of Big Deal on Madonna Street
Black Cobra	Stelvio Massi	Fred Williamson, Eva Grimaldi	Action	
Camping del Terrore	Lamberto Bava	Charles Napier, David Hess, Bruce Penhall, Mimsy Farmer	Horror	
Chronicle of a Death Foretold	Francesco Rosi	Rupert Everett, Ornella Muti, Anthony Delon, Gian Maria Volonté	Drama	
Cross of the Seven Jewels	Marco Antonio Andolfi	Marco Antonio Andolfi, Annie Belle, Gordon Mitchell		
Il commissario Lo Gatto	Dino Risi	Lino Banfi, Maurizio Ferrini	Comedy	
Control	Giuliano Montaldo	Burt Lancaster, Ben Gazzara, Kate Nelligan, Ingrid Thulin	Drama/Sci Fi	
D'Annunzio	Sergio Nasca	Robert Powell, Stefania Sandrelli	Biographical	
Da grande	Franco Amurri	Renato Pozzetto, Giulia Boschi, Ottavia Piccolo, Alessandro Haber	Romantic comedy	Nastro d'argento for best story (Silver Ribbon)
Dark Eyes (Oci ciornie)	Nikita Mikhalkov	Marcello Mastroianni, Silvana Mangano	Drama based on Anton Chekhov stories	Academy Award nominee for Best Actor. Cannes Film Festival Best Actor
Delizia	Joe D'Amato	Tinì Cansino, Adriana Russo	Sex Comedy	
Delirium	Lamberto Bava	Serena Grandi, Daria Nicolodi, Sabrina Salerno	Giallo	
Delta Force Commando	Pierluigi Ciriaci	Brett Baxter, Fred Williamson, Bo Svenson		
Distant Lights	Aurelio Chiesa	Tomas Milian, Laura Morante	Sci-fi	
Double Target	Bruno Mattei	Miles O'Keeffe, Donald Pleasence, Bo Svenson	Action	
Django 2	Nello Rossati	Franco Nero, Donald Pleasence, Christopher Connelly, William Berger	Spaghetti Western	Official sequel of Django
The Family	Ettore Scola	Vittorio Gassman, Stefania Sandrelli, Fanny Ardant, Ottavia Piccolo, Andrea Occhipinti, Sergio Castellitto, Philippe Noiret	Drama	5 David di Donatello, Academy Award nominee, 6 Nastro d'Argento, entered at Cannes
Farewell Moscow	Mauro Bolognini	Liv Ullmann, Daniel Olbrychski, Aurore Clément	Drama	
The Gold Rimmed Glasses	Giuliano Montaldo	Philippe Noiret, Rupert Everett, Valeria Golino, Stefania Sandrelli	Drama	
Good Morning, Babylon	Paolo and Vittorio Taviani	Vincent Spano, Joaquim de Almeida, Greta Scacchi		
Graveyard Disturbance	Lamberto Bava	Gregory Lech Thaddeus, Lea Martino, Beatrice Ring		Television film
Hotel Colonial	Cinzia Th. Torrini	John Savage, Robert Duvall, Massimo Troisi, Rachel Ward	Adventure	
Intervista	Federico Fellini	Marcello Mastroianni, Anita Ekberg	Felliniesque	Won the Golden Prize at Moscow and a Cannes Award
Io e mia sorella	Carlo Verdone	Carlo Verdone, Ornella Muti, Elena Sofia Ricci	Comedy	
Italian Postcards	Memè Perlini	Geneviève Page, Lindsay Kemp	drama	Screened at the 1987 Cannes Film Festival
Julia and Julia	Peter Del Monte	Kathleen Turner, Gabriel Byrne, Sting	Drama	First feature shot on high definition tape and then transferred to 35 mm film
Kamikazen ultima notte a Milano	Gabriele Salvatores	Gigio Alberti, Claudio Bisio, Silvio Orlando	Comedy	
The Last Emperor	Bernardo Bertolucci	John Lone, Joan Chen, Peter O'Toole, Ruocheng Ying, Victor Wong, Dennis Dun, Ryuichi Sakamoto, Maggie Han, Ric Young, Vivian Wu	Biopic, Drama	9 Academy Award. 3 BAFTA. 9 David di Donatello. 4 Golden Globe. 1 Grammy. 3 Nastro d'Argento
Man on Fire	Élie Chouraqui	Scott Glenn, Joe Pesci, Danny Aiello	Action	
Missione eroica - I pompieri 2	Giorgio Capitani	Paolo Villaggio, Lino Banfi, Massimo Boldi	Comedy	
Montecarlo Gran Casinò	Carlo Vanzina	Massimo Boldi, Christian De Sica, Ezio Greggio	Comedy	
The Moro Affair (Il caso Moro)	Giuseppe Ferrara	Gian Maria Volonté		Volonté won the Best Actor award at Berlin
My First Forty Years	Carlo Vanzina	Carol Alt, Elliott Gould, Jean Rochefort	Drama	
Noi uomini duri	Maurizio Ponzi	Renato Pozzetto, Enrico Montesano	Comedy film	
Notte italiana	Carlo Mazzacurati	Marco Messeri, Giulia Boschi, Mario Adorf	Comedy drama	
Opera	Dario Argento	Cristina Marsillach, Ian Charleston, Urnabo Barberini	Giallo	
I picari	Mario Monicelli	Giancarlo Giannini, Enrico Montesano, Vittorio Gassman, Nino Manfredi	Action	
Private Affairs	Francesco Massaro	Giuliana De Sio, Michele Placido, Kate Capshaw, David Naughton	Romantic comedy	
I ragazzi di via Panisperna	Gianni Amelio	Laura Morante, Ennio Fantastichini, Mario Adorf, Virna Lisi	Drama	
Il ragazzo dal kimono d'oro (Karate Warrior)	Fabrizio De Angelis	Kim Rossi Stuart, Ken Watanabe	Action	
Un ragazzo di Calabria	Luigi Comencini	Gian Maria Volonté, Diego Abatantuono, Thérèse Liotard	Comedy drama	
Regina	Salvatore Piscicelli	Ida Di Benedetto, Fabrizio Bentivoglio	Drama	
Rimini Rimini	Sergio Corbucci	Paolo Villaggio, Serena Grandi, Laura Antonelli, Jerry Calà	Comedy	
Roba da ricchi	Sergio Corbucci	Paolo Villaggio, Serena Grandi, Laura Antonelli, Jerry Calà	Comedy	
Scirocco	Aldo Lado	Fiona Gélin	erotic	
Scuola di ladri - Parte seconda	Neri Parenti	Paolo Villaggio, Massimo Boldi, Enrico Maria Salerno	Comedy	
Secondo Ponzio Pilato	Luigi Magni	Nino Manfredi, Stefania Sandrelli, Lando Buzzanca	Historical comedy drama	
Shatterer	Tonino Valerii	Koji Kikkawa, Andy J. Forest, Beatrice Ring, Marina Suma, Orazio Orlando	Action, Crime	Italian-Japanese co-production
Soldati - 365 all'alba	Marco Risi	Claudio Amendola, Agostina Belli, Alessandro Benvenuti	drama	
Sotto il ristorante cinese	Bruno Bozzetto	Amanda Sandrelli	Comedy-Fantasy	
Sottozero	Gian Luigi Polidoro	Jerry Calà, Angelo Infanti	Comedy drama	
Specters	Marcello Avallone	Donald Pleasence	Horror	
Stage Fright	Michele Soavi	Barbara Cupisti, David Brandon	Giallo	
Strana la vita	Giuseppe Bertolucci	Diego Abatantuono, Monica Guerritore, Domiziana Giordano, Lina Sastri	Comedy drama	
Strike Commando	Bruno Mattei	Reb Brown, Christopher Connelly, Alex Vitale, Luciano Pigozzi	War, Action film	Italian-Filipino co-production
Striker	Enzo G. Castellari	Frank Zagarino, John Phillip Law	Action	
A Taxi Driver in New York	Alberto Sordi	Alberto Sordi, Dom DeLuise, George Gaynes	Comedy	
Teresa	Dino Risi	Serena Grandi, Luca Barbareschi	Comedy	
Ternosecco	Giancarlo Giannini	Giancarlo Giannini, Victoria Abril	Comedy	
Thunder Warrior II	Larry Ludman	Mark Gregory, Raimund Harmstorf, Bo Svenson	Action	
They Call Me Renegade	E.B. Clucher	Terence Hill, Robert Vaughn, Norman Bowler	Action-Comedy	
Vado a riprendermi il gatto	Giuliano Biagetti	Mario Adorf, Barbara De Rossi, Jean-Pierre Cassel	Comedy drama	
Via Montenapoleone	Carlo Vanzina	Carol Alt, Corinne Cléry, Renée Simonsen, Valentina Cortese	Comedy drama	
Le vie del Signore sono finite	Massimo Troisi	Massimo Troisi, Corinne Cléry, Jo Champa, Marco Messeri	Comedy drama	
White Apache	Bruno Mattei, Claudio Fragasso	Sebastian Harrison, Lola Forner	Spaghetti Western	
