= Arabella Black Angel =

- Arabella l'angelo nero
- Directed by: Stelvio Massi
- Written by: R. Filippucci
- Starring: Tinì Cansino; Valentina Visconti; Francesco Casale
- Cinematography: Stefano Catalano
- Edited by: Cesare Bianchini
- Music by: Serfran
- Production company: Arpa International S.r.l.
- Release date: 1989
- Country: Italy
- Language: Italian

Arabella Black Angel (Italian: Arabella l'angelo nero) is a 1989 Italian erotic horror film directed by Stelvio Massi. The film stars Tinì Cansino as an unsatisfied married woman who lives a double life as a sex worker. She finds herself the main suspect in a series of murders and attempts to find the real killer.

== Plot summary ==
Deborah Veronesi, evading a career blackmailer named Nick stalking her, goes to a warehouse sex party to partake in the activities, as her husband, Francesco, who was paralyzed on their wedding day, wants new writing material. The vice squad raids the warehouse and detains everyone, except for Deborah, who hides, waiting for her chance to escape. However, a cop named Alfonso de Rosa, stayed behind to apprehend her. Believing she is a prostitute, he cuffs and rapes her while Nick takes photos. He lets Deborah go afterwards, and she speeds off, leaving her purse for de Rosa to find.

The next morning, Deborah evades another of Francesco's angry fits. A flashback to the cause of Francesco's paralysis occurs. It is revealed the cause of the paralysis was a car accident that occurred while Francesco received oral sex from Deborah. De Rosa arrives, having tracked Deborah down, and apologizes for not realizing she is a "respectable" woman. However, he wants more sex, threatening to tell Francesco about her "arrest" and using it as blackmail if she does not allow him to do with her as he wants. Deborah takes de Rosa to an outdoor storage shack. As Francesco sees de Rosa going down on Deborah, Deborah kills the cop with blow to the head using a mallet. The couple buries de Rosa in the yard.

Francesco is inspired and decides to order Deborah to prostitute herself to various men, as he wants to write a book on a sultry female lead and use her to inform his story. Deborah objects repeatedly to his demands throughout, but he makes her keep going no matter how objectified and ashamed she feels. Francesco's mother Martha, in the meantime, keeps the house together and warmly cares for the couple.

Nick calls someone about his photos of Deborah and de Rosa once he is reported missing, only for Nick to be stabbed with scissors by an unseen attacker. He is then castrated after he dies. Deborah is picked up by a man at a Western-themed bar, and when they go to a hotel room, Deborah pours champagne over her naked body, and then the two make have sex. After she leaves, the killer stabs and emasculates the man after shoving him into the hotel room. The lead investigator, Gina Fowler, is haunted by the crime scene, as the case evokes memories of when her mother killed her father when she was a child. For most of her life, Gina has had nightmares of being stabbed and sexually mutilated as a consequence of her trauma. Things worsen when Agnese Borden, a journalist and Gina's girlfriend, publicizes revealing details of Gina's involvement, laughing and insulting her before they break up. Gina knows Borden is out to meet the killer, so they have a confrontation and violent fight starts at the park where the meeting is arranged; Gina storms away. When night falls, the killer cuts Borden's throat with the scissors and mutilates her genitals.

In a final escapade, Francesco has Deborah pick up a male street prostitute. It is revealed that he has been faking his paralysis as he follows her. Meanwhile, Gina reunites with her estranged mother, revealed to be Martha, whom she has not see for years while Martha was institutionalized. They drive together. While Gina makes a call to the police, Martha speeds off in the car.

After Deborah is done with the male prostitute, Francesco appears, shocking Deborah when she sees he is not paralyzed. He confesses to faking the condition as a way to get creative ideas, which ultimately failed. He demands Deborah keep providing inspiration for him. When she refuses to continue due to his lies, Francesco rapes her while making sexually charged threats. The killer appears and stabs him to death, at which it is revealed to be Martha, shocked to have killed her son. Deborah meets Gina, who tells her Martha never understood sex and had an enraged mania that drove her to kill, reassuring Deborah it is not her fault. Deborah is last seen back at the sex club, making out with the members as she did when she first arrived.

== Cast ==
Cast adapted from Blood & Black Lace.

- Tinì Cansino as Arabella/Deborah Veronesi
- Valentina Visconti as Gina Fowler
- Francesco Casale as Francesco J. Veronesi
- Carlo Mucari as De Rosa
- Renato D'Amore as Scognamillo
- Ida Galli as Martha Veronesi

== Production ==
Stelvio Massi was working on post-production on the film Taxi Killer when the producer announced the film had gone bankrupt, leading the film to be shelved. Massi moved on to direct Arabella Black Angel under the name of "Max Steel".

The film stars Tinì Cansino, who was best known in Italy for her appearances on the television series Drive In.

== Release ==
Arabella Black Angel was released in 1989. It was released by Penthouse Video in Japan under the English title of Black Angel with an 88-minute running time. Vinegar Syndrome released the film as Arabella Black Angel as part of their Forgotten Gialli: Volume Four box set along with The Killer is Still Among Us and The Sister of Ursula.

== Reception ==
From retrospective reviews, critic and film historian Roberto Curti found the film to be derivative of Ken Russel's Crimes of Passion (1984) and finding it bared no trace of the visual flair Massi had showcased in the past. Curti also found Cansino's acting weak when performing the more sexual scenes in the film. Adrian Luther Smith in his book Blood & Black Lace also noted that Massi "seems happy to wade around in the script's sex and violence" while finding Cansino to be what weakens the film, referring to her as an "unassured actress."

== See also ==
- List of Italian films of 1989
