= Giorgia Gianetiempo =

Italian actress, singer and model (born 1996)

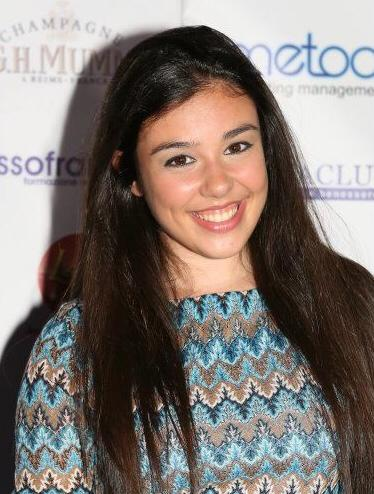
- Giorgia Gianetiempo in 2014
- Born: Giorgia Gianetiempo; 24 September 1996 (age 29); Mercato San Severino, Salerno, Italy
- Education: Torquato Tasso gymnasium high school (Salerno); Sapienza University of Rome
- Occupations: Actress, singer and model
- Years active: 1999–present
- Known for: Un posto al sole
- Height: 1.65 m (5 ft 5 in)
- Partner: Luca Turco (2017–present)

Giorgia Gianetiempo (born 24 September 1996) is an Italian actress, singer and model.

== Biography ==
Giorgia Gianetiempo was born on 24 September 1996, in Mercato San Severino, in the province of Salerno (Italy), she has a younger brother named Andrea and from an early age she showed an inclination for acting, so much so that she began acting in 1999. In addition to Italian, she is fluent in English and practices singing, dancing, horse riding, and swimming.

== Career ==
Giorgia Gianetiempo began acting in 1999 after being chosen to participate in the first season of the series broadcast on Rai 1 Un medico in famiglia. In the same year, she starred in the short film The Last Boys produced by the Giffoni Film Festival. In 2000 he made his film debut in the film Camici bianchi directed by Stefano Amatucci. The following year, in 2001, she starred in the third season of the series broadcast on Rai 1 Una donna per amico and in the film Domenica directed by Wilma Labate.

In 2002, he acted in the episode Dopo la sentenza of the miniseries broadcast on Rai 2 Tre casi per Laura C directed by Gianpaolo Tescari and in the series broadcast on Rai 1 Lo zio d'America. The following year, in 2003, he participated in the cast of the series broadcast on Rai Scuola Il divertinglese and in the miniseries broadcast on Rai 1 Un papà quasi perfetto and in the series broadcast on HBO Angels in America directed by Mike Nichols. In the same year he played the role of Extra in the film Uomini & donne, amori & bugie directed by Eleonora Giorgi.

In 2005, he acted in the first season of the series broadcast on Rai 1 Gente di mare and in the miniseries broadcast on Canale 5 Padri e figli. In the same year, she joined the cast of the film Mother Nature directed by Massimo Andrei and starred in the short film Sapone directed by G. Magliaro. In 2006, she was chosen to star in the first season of the series broadcast on Canale 5 I Cesaroni. The following year, in 2007, she returned to acting in the fifth season of the series broadcast on Rai 1 Un medico in famiglia. In the same year, she acted in the film Vita, Amore e Destino directed by Carlo Fumo. In 2008, she played the role of Lucia Braibanti in the episode entitled I segreti degli altri from the sixth season of the series broadcast on Rai 1 Don Matteo.

In 2010, he was part of the cast of the tenth season of the series broadcast on Canale 5 Distretto di Polizia. Starting in the same year, she was chosen to play the role of Rossella Graziani, the daughter of Silvia Graziani (played by Luisa Amatucci) and Michele Saviani (played by Alberto Rossi), in the soap opera broadcast on Rai 3 Un posto al sole. In 2011, for this last soap opera, she was nominated for best fiction actress at the film and fiction gala, along with the actors Ilenia Lazzarin, Michelangelo Tommaso and Luca Seta.

In 2012, she was awarded the international prize for her career L'Olimpiade dell'arte e della scienza and the Alfonso Gatto poetry prize, both for the soap opera Un posto al sole. The following year, in 2013, again for this last telenovela, she won the City of Saviano award. From 2013 to 2015, she followed a singing course with F. Palma, and from 2015 to 2017, she followed a singing course at the academy. In 2015 after graduating from the gymnasium of the Torquato Tasso classical secondary school in Salerno, he decided to enroll in the faculty of literature with film direction at the Sapienza University of Rome, obtaining the degree in 2021.

In 2015, she was awarded the Naples Cultural Classic prize and the City of Pomigliano d'Arco international prize, both for the soap opera Un posto al sole. The following year, in 2016, again for this last soap opera, she won the Il sognatore, together with the actors Lorenzo Sarcinelli and Veronica Mazza. In 2017 he received the Excellence Award for Best television drama for the soap opera Un posto al sole, together with the actors Lucio Allocca, Lorenzo Sarcinelli, Amato D'Auria, Antonella Prisco, Raffaele Imparato, the director Bruno Nappi and the graphic designer Maks Schioppa. In 2017 and 2018 she attended a "dance-theater" course with G. Cambrieri.

In 2019, she was awarded the first prize of the Young Jury of the Etnabook Festival, after participating in Estelle's booktrailer. In the same year she was a testimonial for The Beach Wedding Show in Pozzuoli. In November of the same year she was sworn in, along with Luca Turco, in the beauty contest Miss Europe Continental. In 2021, she was the face of the Garnier ultra dolce commercial. In 2023 she participated, together with Luca Turco, in the fashion event presented by Atelier Emé, titled È un Sogno di Primavera.

== Private life ==
Giorgia Gianetiempo since 2017 has been romantically linked to the actor Luca Turco, her colleague in the soap opera Un posto al sole.

== Filmography ==
=== Film ===
Year	Title	Role	Director
2000	Camici bianchi		Stefano Amatucci
2001	Domenica		Wilma Labate
2003	Uomini & donne, amori & bugie	Extra	Eleonora Giorgi
2005	Mother Nature		Massimo Andrei
2007	Vita, Amore e Destino		Carlo Fumo

=== Television ===
Year	Title	Role	Network	Notes
1999, 2007	Un medico in famiglia		Rai 1	Television series
2001	Una donna per amico		Rai 1	Television series
2002	Tre casi per Laura C		Rai 2	Television series, episode Dopo la sentenza
2002	Lo zio d'America		Rai 1	Television miniseries
2003	Il divertinglese		Rai Scuola	Television series
2003	Un papà quasi perfetto		Rai 1	Television miniseries
2003	Angels in America		HBO	Television miniseries
2005	Gente di mare		Rai 1	Television series
2005	Padri e figli		Canale 5	Television miniseries
2006	I Cesaroni		Canale 5	Television series
2008	Don Matteo	Lucia Braibanti	Rai 1	Television series, episode I segreti degli altri
2010	Distretto di Polizia		Canale 5	Television series
2010–present	Un posto al sole	Rossella Graziani	Rai 3	Soap opera

=== Short films ===
Year	Title	Director	Producer
1999	The Last Boys		Giffoni Film Festival
2005	Sapone	G. Magliaro	

== Other activities ==
=== Advertising campaigns ===
Year	Title	Notes
2019	The Beach Wedding Show	
2021	Garnier ultra dolce	

=== Holdings ===
Year	Title	Notes
2019	Estelle book trailer	Etnabook Festival Youth Jury First Prize Event
2019	Miss Europa Continental	Sworn together with Luca Turco
2023	Sogno di Primavera	Event presented by Atelier Emé and present with Luca Turco

== Awards ==
Year	Award	Category	Work	Result	Notes
2011	Film and fiction gala	Best fictional actress	Un posto al sole	Nominated	Together with Ilenia Lazzarin, Michelangelo Tommaso and Luca Seta
2012	International lifetime achievement award L'Olimpiade dell'arte e della scienza		Un posto al sole	Won	
2012	Alfonso Gatto poetry prize		Un posto al sole	Won	
2013	City of Saviano Award		Un posto al sole	Won	
2015	Naples Cultural Classic Award		Un posto al sole	Won	
2015	International Award of the City of Pomigliano d'Arco		Un posto al sole	Won	
2016	Il sognatore Award		Un posto al sole	Won	Together with Lorenzo Sarcinelli and Veronica Mazza
2017	Excelencia Award	Best television drama	Un posto al sole	Won	Together with Lucio Allocca, Lorenzo Sarcinelli, Amato D'Auria, Antonella Prisco, Raffaele Imparato, Bruno Nappi and Maks Schioppa
2019	First prize of the Young Jury of the Etnabook Festival			Won	
