= Delizia (film) =

1987 film by Joe D'Amato

- Italian theatrical release poster
- Delizia
- Directed by: Joe D'Amato
- Written by: Elena Dreon; Riccardo Ghione
- Starring: Tinì Cansino
- Cinematography: Joe D'Amato
- Edited by: Joe D'Amato
- Music by: Guido Anelli; Stefano Mainetti
- Production company: Filmirage
- Distributed by: D.M.V.
- Release date: 14 February 1987 (Italy)
- Running time: 84 minutes
- Country: Italy

Delizia is a 1987 Italian sex comedy film directed by Joe D'Amato as Aristide Massaccesi.

== Plot ==
Italy, late 1980s. An Italian fashion model living in New York decides to sell a villa located in the central Italian countryside.

== Cast ==
- Tinì Cansino as Carol
- Luca Giordana as Claudio
- Giorgio Pietrangeli
- Adriana Russo
- Maurizio Marchisio
- Pippo Cairelli
- Stefania Miniucchi
- Gina Poli
- Antonio Zequila
- Laura Gemser uncredited

== Release ==
The film was theatrically released in Italy on February 14, 1987.

== See also ==
- List of Italian films of 1987
