= Regina (1987 film) =

- Directed by: Salvatore Piscicelli
- Written by: Carla Apuzzo; Salvatore Piscicelli
- Starring: Ida Di Benedetto; Fabrizio Bentivoglio
- Cinematography: Tonino Nardi
- Music by: Helmut Laberer
- Release date: 1987
- Language: Italian

Regina (trad. "Queen") is a 1987 Italian drama film co-written and directed by Salvatore Piscicelli.

== Plot ==
Regina is a beautiful actress of forty in an existential crisis. During a party in the house of her agent Lalla she meets Lorenzo, a young man with whom she establishes a troubled relationship. Their relationship gradually consolidates, but in a sadomasochistic way: the violence and mutual humiliation between the two are continuous. Upon returning to the city after a vacation spent on an island, Regina no longer intends to see Lorenzo and shuts herself in the house. But Lalla makes them meet again. In their dramatic encounter, Regina offends Lorenzo and injures her arm with a knife, telling him she will report him. Lorenzo takes the knife in his hand and hits Regina.

== Cast ==
- Ida Di Benedetto: Regina
- Fabrizio Bentivoglio: Lorenzo
- Giuliana Calandra: Lalla
- Mariano Rigillo

== See also ==
- List of Italian films of 1987
