= At the End of the Night =

2003 film

- Directed by: Salvatore Piscicelli
- Starring: Ennio Fantastichini; Elena Sofia Ricci
- Cinematography: Saverio Guarna
- Music by: Eugenio Colombo
- Release date: 2003
- Country: Italy
- Language: Italian

At the End of the Night (Italian: Alla fine della notte) is a 2003 Italian drama film directed by Salvatore Piscicelli.

== Cast ==
- Ennio Fantastichini: Bruno
- Ida Di Benedetto: Aunt Celeste
- Stefania Orsola Garello: Fiamma
- Anna Ammirati: Bruno's lover
- Roberto Herlitzka: Analyst
- Elena Sofia Ricci
- Ricky Tognazzi
