= Allocca =

Allocca is an Italian surname. Notable people with this surname include:

- Antonio Allocca (1937–2013), Italian actor
- Lucio Allocca (born 1943), Italian actor, playwright, and theatre director
