= Vado a riprendermi il gatto =

- Directed by: Giuliano Biagetti
- Written by: Giuliano Biagetti; Piero Perini; Giuseppe Pinori; Luigi Malerba
- Starring: Mario Adorf; Barbara De Rossi
- Cinematography: Pino Pinori
- Music by: Alberto Radius
- Distributed by: Istituto Luce
- Release date: 1987
- Country: Italy
- Language: Italian

Vado a riprendermi il gatto (I'm going to take back the cat) is a 1987 Italian romantic comedy-drama film directed by Giuliano Biagetti.

== Plot ==
Alceo always lived in solitude, working the land (his only company was a cat), when one day he meets Ester, a girl younger than him. The two like each other and Alceo decides to take her to his cottage. Partly for his shady and grumpy character, partly for his deep-rooted habit of living alone, Alceo soon gets tired of his partner. When Ester decides to leave, Alceo would like to compensate her with money: she instead asks him for the cat. Some time later Alceo realizes that loneliness weighs too much on him: he returns to Ester to take her home but, during the journey, to those who ask him where he is going, he answers sardonically to "go and get the cat".

== Cast ==
- Mario Adorf: Alceo Brancicalori
- Barbara De Rossi: Ester
- Jean-Pierre Cassel
- Alessandro Partexano

== See also ==
- List of Italian films of 1987
