= Geneviève Page =

French actress (1927–2025)

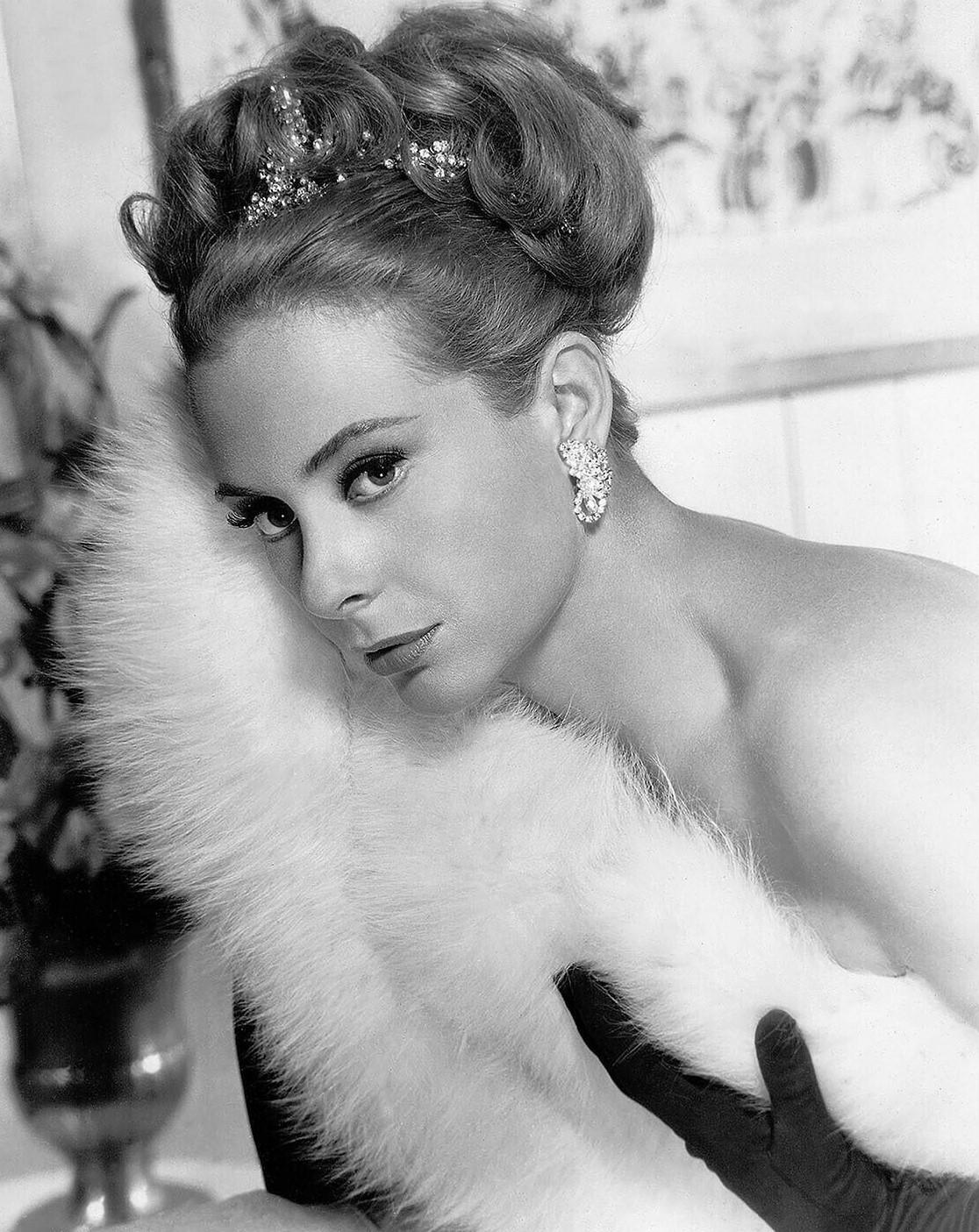
- Page in Youngblood Hawke (1964)
- Born: Geneviève Bonjean; 13 December 1927; Paris, France
- Died: 14 February 2025 (aged 97); Paris, France
- Education: Conservatoire national des arts et métiers; École du Louvre
- Occupation: Actress
- Years active: 1951–2003 (film); 1943–1998 (theatre)
- Known for: El Cid (1961), Belle de Jour (1967),The Private Life of Sherlock Holmes (1970)
- Spouse: Jean Claude-Bujard (m. 1959; died 2011)
- Children: 2

Geneviève Bonjean (13 December 1927 – 14 February 2025), known professionally as Geneviève Page (French pronunciation: [ʒənvjɛv paʒ]), was a French actress with a film career spanning fifty years and also numerous English-speaking film productions. She was the daughter of French art collector Jacques Paul Bonjean (1899–1990).

== Early life ==
Page was born in Paris on 13 December 1927, to a family of aesthetes, like her father Jacques Bonjean, who collected art from 17th century France, and her mother Germaine (born Lipman) Bonjean. Her mother's family was Jewish, and had founded LIP. At the age of six, her godfather Christian Dior played the piano with Page's mother, and talked to Page about talking to adults. She recalls, "He had no money at the time, and drew hats for big houses. He had lunch every other day at home and played the piano, with my mother in my room, with four hands. I took refuge in the bathroom to learn my lessons." At the age of twelve, Page read some works by Voltaire, and to her mother's surprise, her father replied "If she can't read Voltaire, she can't read anyone." Despite this, she was a very talented young girl, playing Musset at Théâtre National Populaire and entering the Conservatory.

== Career ==
Her film début was in Pas de pitié pour les femmes (1951), followed by Fanfan la Tulipe (1952), in which she played Madame de Pompadour alongside Gérard Philipe and Gina Lollobrigida. Later, she appeared in Italian, French, British, and American films. She co-starred with Robert Mitchum and Ingrid Thulin in Foreign Intrigue (1956), Dirk Bogarde and Capucine in Song Without End (1960), Charlton Heston and Sophia Loren in El Cid (1961), and was seen in Grand Prix (1966) with James Garner, and Belle de Jour (1967), with Catherine Deneuve and directed by Luis Buñuel. She appeared with Deneuve again when she played Countess Larisch in Mayerling (1968), also co-starring with Ava Gardner and James Mason.

Billy Wilder cast her as the mysterious widow in The Private Life of Sherlock Holmes (1970) because the character she played used her sex appeal to manipulate Holmes. She appeared in Robert Altman's Beyond Therapy (1987) and continued to act until 2003.

=== Theatre ===
She acted in 1943 in Le Soulier de Satin and in Oh! Les Beaux Jours, both of which were directed by Jean-Louis Barrault Madeleine Renaud Co. Her theatre career continued in the 1980s and 1990s, with Les larmes amères de Petra von Kant (The Bitter Tears of Petra von Kant) (1980), La nuit des rois (Twelfth Night, William Shakespeare), La femme sur le lit (The Woman on the Bed, Franco Brusati) 1994, and Delicate Balance (1998).

== Personal life and death ==
Page was educated at École du Louvre and Conservatoire national des arts et métiers. Page was married to Jean-Claude Bujard from 1959 until his death on 29 August 2011; the couple had two children. In an interview from 2013, she said she was having stewardship problems in her house and that she was "not used to talking anymore".

Page died in Paris on 14 February 2025, at the age of 97.

== Selected filmography ==
Year	Title	Role	Director
1952	Fanfan la Tulipe	Madame de Pompadour	Christian-Jaque
1952	Pleasures of Paris	Violet	Ralph Baum
1953	Open Letter	Colette Simonet	Alex Joffé
1954	L'Étrange Désir de monsieur Bard	Donata	Géza von Radványi
1956	Foreign Intrigue	Dominique Danemore	Sheldon Reynolds
1956	The Silken Affair	Geneviève Gérard	Roy Kellino
1956	Michel Strogoff	Nadia Fédor	Carmine Gallone
1957	Amour de poche	Édith	Pierre Kast
1957	Trapped in Tangier	Mary Bolevasco	Riccardo Freda
1960	Song Without End	Countess Marie	George Cukor and Charles Vidor
1961	El Cid	Princess Urraca	Anthony Mann
1963	The Day and the Hour	Agathe Dutheil	René Clément
1963	The Reluctant Spy	Ursula Keller	Jean-Charles Dudrumet
1964	Youngblood Hawke	Frieda Winter	Delmer Daves
1965	The Majordomo	Agnès des Vallières	Jean Delannoy
1965	Three Rooms in Manhattan	Yolande Combes	Marcel Carné
1966	Tender Scoundrel	Béatrice Dumonceaux	Jean Becker
1966	Corsaires et Flibustiers	Mary Brown	Claude Barma
1966	Grand Prix	Monique Delvaux-Sarti	John Frankenheimer
1967	Belle de jour	Madame Anais	Luis Buñuel
1968	Mayerling	Countess Marie Larisch von Moennich	Terence Young
1968	Decline and Fall... of a Birdwatcher	Margot	John Krish
1968	A Talent for Loving	Delphine	Richard Quine
1970	The Private Life of Sherlock Holmes	Gabrielle Valadon	Billy Wilder
1979	Buffet froid	Geneviève Léonard (the widow)	Bertrand Blier
1982	Mortelle randonnée	Madame Schmidt-Boulanger	Claude Miller
1987	Beyond Therapy	Zizi	Robert Altman
1987	Italian Postcards	Silvana	Memè Perlini
1989	Les Bois noirs	Nathalie Dupin	Jacques Deray
1992	L'Inconnu dans la maison	Bernadette	Georges Lautner

== Accolades ==
Year	Title	Award
1980	Les larmes amères de Petra von Kant	Critics Prize for Best Actress
1994	La femme sur le lit	Colombe Prix Plaisir du Théâtre Best Actress
