= The Opportunities of Rosa =

- Directed by: Salvatore Piscicelli
- Starring: Marina Suma
- Cinematography: Renato Tafuri
- Release date: 1981
- Language: Italian

The Opportunities of Rosa (Italian: Le occasioni di Rosa, also known as Rosa's Chance) is a 1981 Italian drama film directed by Salvatore Piscicelli. For her performance in this film Marina Suma, here at her film debut, won a David di Donatello for best new actress.

== Cast ==
- Marina Suma as Rosa
- Angelo Cannavacciuolo as Gino
- Gianni Prestieri

== See also ==
- List of Italian films of 1981
