= Lucio Allocca =

Italian actor (born 1943)

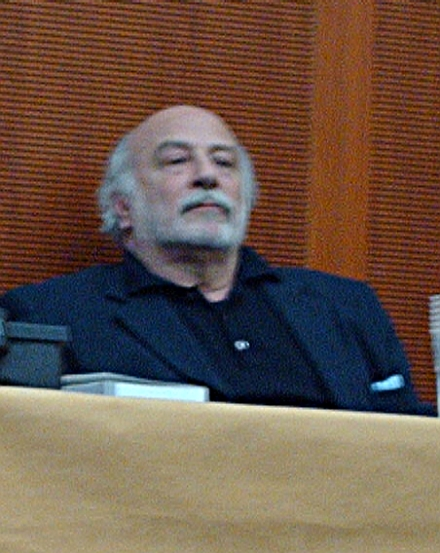
- Allocca in 2008
- Born: 5 July 1943 (age 81); Naples, Italy
- Occupation: Actor

Lucio Allocca (born 5 July 1943) is an Italian actor, theatre director and playwright.

== Life and career ==
Born in Naples, in 1966 Allocca graduated from the School of Dramatic Art of the Politecnico di Napoli, and was mainly active on theatre, in which he worked with important names such as Eduardo De Filippo, Peppino De Filippo, Mario Martone, Ugo Gregoretti, Michele Galdieri, Mario Scaccia, and Renato Carpentieri. Also a playwright and a theatrical director, he his artistic director of the Theatre de Poche in his hometown.

Allocca got his first film major role in 1979, in Salvatore Piscicelli's Immacolata and Concetta: The Other Jealousy, and then specialized in character roles. He is best known for the role of Otello Testa in the long-running soap opera Un posto al sole. In 2018 he suffered a heart attack and underwent an angioplasty surgery.
