= Sweets from a Stranger (film) =

- Directed by: Franco Ferrini
- Screenplay by: Franco Ferrini; Andrea Giuseppini
- Story by: Franco Ferrini; Andrea Giuseppini
- Produced by: Claudio Bonivento
- Starring: Barbara De Rossi; Marina Suma; Athina Cenci; Mara Venier; Laura Betti
- Cinematography: Giuseppe Bernardini
- Edited by: Franco Fraticelli
- Music by: Umberto Smaila
- Production companies: Reteitalia; Numero Uno Cinematografica
- Distributed by: CIDIF
- Release dates: 2 April 1987 (Bologna, Italy)
- Country: Italy
- Budget: 2 billion lire

Sweets from a Stranger (Italian: Caramelle da uno sconosciuto) is a 1987 Italian thriller film directed and co-written by Franco Ferrini. The film is about a serial killer targeting sex workers. The women decided to band together to protect themselves, but their efforts are only partially successful as the killer continues their killing spree. As the police investigate, the sex workers group together to try and find some leads on their own.

Ferrini got the idea for the film while writing the film Red Rings of Fear (1978). It was produced with a budget of 2 billion Italian lire. Retrospective reviewers commented on if the film should be considered a proper giallo, noting its subdued nature and attempts at Social realism, while noting its reveal of the killer and violent scenes relate it to the other gialli.

== Plot ==
In Rome a maniac kills several sex workers, torturing them with a razor. Soon they are informed that the murderer kills the victims not only with a razor, but delivers the deathblow to them with a bolt gun. Stella, a luxury call girl, learns about the murder of Bruna, a fellow streetwalker and old friend. Only Bruna's colleagues attend the funeral. Nadine, an experienced sex worker with a cheerful but tenacious personality, decides to organize a group of her fellow prostitutes to protect themselves and to discover the identity of the serial killer before he strikes again.

== Cast ==
Cast adapted from So Deadly, So Perverse Volume 2.

- Barbara De Rossi as Lena
- Marina Suma as Angela
- Athina Cenci as Nadine
- Mara Venier as Stella
- Laura Betti as Jolanda
- Anny Papa as Monica
- Ilaria Cecchi as Valentina

== Production ==
Directo Franco Ferrini got the idea for Sweets From a Stranger while scripting the film Red Rings of Fear (1978). Ferrini stated he was inspired by Fritz Lang's film M (1931) for the film.

It was shot with a budget of 2 billion Italian lire.

== Style ==
In his book Blood & Black Lace, Adrian Luther-Smith described the film as a "subdued thriller with social realism at its core.", while saying "it's clearly a giallo and the revelation of the killer's identity is suitably ridiculous" Troy Howarth, in his book So Deadly, So Perverse stated the films giallo elements are "somewhat muted" and that the film "in some respects more of a social document than a proper thriller, but it warrants inclusion [in his book giallo] for its novel variation on a standard formula."

== Release and reception ==
The film was released in Bologna, Italy on April 2, 1987. This was followed by screenings in Bari on April 3, Milan on April 10, and other locations in Italy. Film critic and historian Roberto Curti described the audience and critical reception to the film as being "cold to say the least". From a contemporary review in Corriere della sera, a reviewer stated "for our part, we think Ferrini went way over his head."

From retrospective reviews, Howarth stated that "emphasis on the social aspect of the film will likely be off-putting for some more thrill hungry viewers" while stating that "Ferrini paces the material wery well and the actors all give very credible performances" noting that "Ferrini ensures that the film is engaging as both a drama and a thriller." Luther-Smith stated that "despite [Ferrini]'s best intentions, I would rather sit through [Ferrini-scripted Rings of Fear] ten times than watch this docu-drama again." Curti stated that the film was an uneasy mixture of violence, patronizing character study, and weak dialogue.
