= Quando c'era lui... caro lei! =

- Directed by: Giancarlo Santi
- Written by: Oreste Del Buono; Hugo Pratt; Gianni Manganelli; Giancarlo Santi
- Starring: Paolo Villaggio
- Cinematography: Aldo Tonti
- Music by: Alfredo Polacchi
- Release date: 1978
- Language: Italian

Quando c'era lui... caro lei! (translation: "When he was there ... you dear!") is a 1978 Italian comedy film written and directed by Giancarlo Santi. It is a satirical recount of the Italian fascist era.

== Plot ==
A limousine stops in front of a petrol station owned by Beretta, which recognizes two of his old friends in the car: the commissioner Pavanati and the Senator Rossetti, once an anarchist. The two invite Beretta to the restaurant, where they will recall their days under fascism.

== Cast ==
- Paolo Villaggio as Beretta
- Gianni Cavina as Pavanati
- Hugo Pratt as Rossetti
- Maria Grazia Buccella as Lauretta (Clara Petacci)
- Mario Carotenuto as The Pope
- Orietta Berti as Rachele
- Marcello Bonini as Gabriele D'Annunzio
- Giuliana Calandra as Elena of Montenegro
- Eolo Capritti as Benito Mussolini
- Dante Cleri as The Mayor
- Salvatore Funari as Victor Emmanuel III of Italy
- Gianni Magni as Sbrodaglio (Pietro Badoglio)
- Tiberio Murgia as The Driver
- Memè Perlini as Adolf Hitler
- John Stacy as Lord Chamberlain
