= Cuori nella tormenta =

- Directed by: Enrico Oldoini
- Written by: Furio Scarpelli; Carlo Verdone; Ettore Scola; Enrico Oldoini
- Starring: Carlo Verdone; Lello Arena; Marina Suma
- Cinematography: Alessandro D'Eva
- Edited by: Alberto Gallitti
- Music by: Manuel De Sica; Fiorenzo Carpi
- Release date: 1984
- Running time: 103 minutes
- Country: Italy
- Language: Italian

Cuori nella tormenta (Hearts in the storm) is a 1984 Italian romantic comedy film. It marked the directorial debut of Enrico Oldoini.

== Plot ==
Walter is a non-commissioned officer of the Navy, while Raf is a ship's cook; they become great friends but unfortunately they fall in love, without knowing it, with the same girl, Sonia, who clearly prefers the most brilliant Walter. The girl does not have the courage to reveal it to Raf, who believes instead that she loves him to death.

== Cast ==
- Carlo Verdone as Walter Migliorini
- Lello Arena as Raffaele aka "Raf"
- Marina Suma as Sonia
- Rossana Di Lorenzo as Walter's Mother

== See also ==
- List of Italian films of 1984
