= Immacolata and Concetta: The Other Jealousy =

- Directed by: Salvatore Piscicelli
- Screenplay by: Carla Apuzzo; Salvatore Piscicelli
- Produced by: Enzo Porcelli
- Starring: Ida Di Benedetto
- Cinematography: Emilio Bestetti
- Edited by: Roberto Schiavone
- Music by: Remo Ugolinelli
- Production company: Antea Cinematografica
- Distributed by: Titanus
- Release date: March 1980
- Running time: 94 minutes
- Country: Italy
- Language: Italian

Immacolata e Concetta (internationally released as Immacolata and Concetta: The Other Jealousy) is a 1980 Italian drama film directed by Salvatore Piscicelli, in his feature film directorial debut. The film stars Ida Di Benedetto, Marcella Michelangeli, Tommaso Bianco and Lucio Allocca.

It won the Silver Leopard at the Locarno International Film Festival. For her performance Ida Di Benedetto was awarded the Silver Ribbon for best actress. It was the first Italian film to represent in explicit terms the sexual relationship between two women.

== Plot ==
The film revolves around a lesbian affair in working-class southern Italy. Immacolata is bisexual and married to Pasquale, who is an obnoxious brute. She is the proprietor of a butcher shop that is underperforming financially, and has a small daughter she loves very much. She is also having an affair with Ciro, who owns a chain of butcher shops.

One day, Immacolata is caught with Ciro and another woman in a threesome by Ciro's wife, and she ends up going to prison for a year, for supposedly coercing the other woman that participated in the threesome into prostitution.

In prison, she meets Concetta, a lesbian who wound up in prison for shooting the husband of her last lover. The pair begin a passionate affair in prison, which continues after they are released from prison, as Immacolata moves Concetta into her home, much to the chagrin of Pasquale. The neighbors are outraged as well and shun the pair. And to further complicate matters, Immacolata resumes her affair with Ciro.

In the end, when Immacolata continues to see Ciro out of urgent financial need, finds herself pregnant, Concetta goes mad with jealousy and mercilessly kills her.

== Cast ==
- Ida Di Benedetto as Immacolata
- Marcella Michelangeli as Concetta
- Tommaso Bianco as Ciro
- Lucio Allocca as Pasquale
- Biancamaria Mastrominico as Lucia
- Lucia Ragni
- Nina De Padova
- Linda Moretti
- Antonio Ferrante
- Berto Lama
- Cetty Sommella

== Reception ==
The authors of Global Neorealism wrote the film "shunned nostalgia in favor of the here and now of 1970s Italy; it deliberately articulated the need for greater authenticity in Italian cinema by featuring a Neapolitan story and local actors familiar with Neapolitan dialect." Author Derek Duncan opined that "the melodrama is expressed through a low key realism interspersed with quite explicit sex scenes where the actors deploy gestures reminiscent of 1970s pornography; this stylistically hybrid film identifies sexuality as an element in a convoluted social narrative in which desire is not securely fastened to an identifiable object."

Film historian Peter Bondanella stated "this sensitive and compelling portrayal of an affair between two women of different social classes ends in the murder of the wealthier lover who has betrayed her female companion for a man; although made by a man, this film proves that gender poses no artistic barriers to a sympathetic treatment of lesbian passion." I Dizionari Del Cinema: Erotico opined that "Piscicelli writes and directs a darkly tinged lesbian melodrama, imbuing the images with a pathos and harshness completely unprecedented in the Italian filmmaking scene."

Film critic Vincent Canby said that "for a film so full of high melodrama, and for one that includes several extraordinarily explicit sex scenes, it is a most cool and disciplined work; the film is levelheaded, unastonished and unsentimental; it doesn't waste time wringing its hands over terrible disappointments, or in seeking cheap sympathy." Joanna Connors of The Minneapolis Star observed "the dark tone Piscicelli lends to the film adds to the sense of doom and overripe sensuality."

Ginger Varney of LA Weekly was not impressed with the film, writing, "you don't learn how and where the love developed between Immacolata and Concetta; probably it was in prison; but the direction and editing were so dreadful I'm still not sure; the actresses gave the lifeless dialogue the lifeless delivery it deserved and looked about as bored with one another as the audience was with them." Critic Kevin Thomas commented that "Piscicelli makes a bold feature debut in this stark, humorous and totally outrageous Italian film ... it seems either to drive viewers quickly up the aisle or to hold them in rapt attention."

== Accolades ==
The film won the Critic's prize at the 1980 Cannes Film Festival. It also won the Silver Leopard at the Locarno International Film Festival. Ida Di Benedetto was awarded the Silver Ribbon for best actress, by the Sindacato Nazionale Giornalisti Cinematografici, for her performance.

== See also ==
- Cinema of Italy
- List of Italian films of 1980
- List of LGBTQ-related films of 1980
- List of feature films with lesbian characters
- List of feature films with bisexual characters
