= Il corpo dell'anima =

- Directed by: Salvatore Piscicelli
- Cinematography: Saverio Guarna
- Release date: 1999
- Language: Italian

Il corpo dell'anima (The body of the soul) is a 1999 Italian erotic drama film directed by Salvatore Piscicelli.

== Cast ==
- Roberto Herlitzka: Ernesto
- Raffaella Ponzo: Luana
- Ennio Fantastichini: Mauro
- Gianluigi Pizzetti: Sandro
