= Marina Suma =

Italian actress

- Born: 14 November 1959 (age 66); Naples, Italy
- Occupation: Actress

Marina Suma (born 14 November 1959) is an Italian actress.

== Life and career ==
Born in Naples, Suma started her career as a glamour model, and made her film debut in Salvatore Piscicelli's Le occasioni di Rosa. For her performance in this film, she won a David di Donatello for best new actress. Later, she starred in Carlo Vanzina's Sapore di mare and in a number of successful comedy films. From the 1990s, she focused her activities on television.

== Selected filmography ==
- The Opportunities of Rosa (1981)
- Time for Loving (1982)
- Sing Sing (1983)
- A Boy and a Girl (1983)
- Cuori nella tormenta (1984)
- Blues metropolitano (1985)
- Shatterer (1987)
- Sweets from a Stranger (1987)
- Dark Bar (1989)
- Disperatamente Giulia (1989)
- Infelici e contenti (1992)
- Pater Familias (2003)
- Mozzarella Stories (2011)
