= Ida Di Benedetto =

Italian actress and film producer (born 1945)

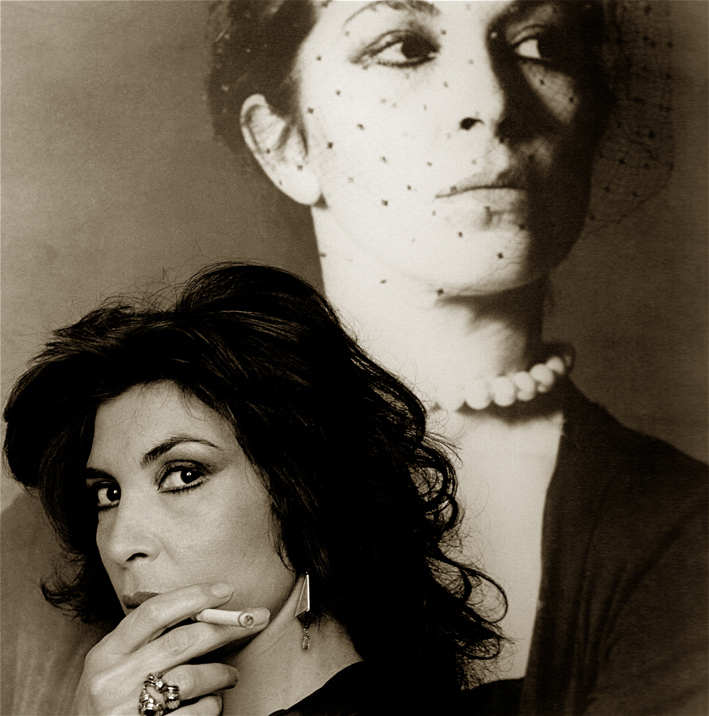
- Ida Di Benedetto in 1987, photographed by Augusto De Luca
- Born: 3 June 1945 (age 80); Naples, Kingdom of Italy
- Occupations: Actress; producer
- Years active: 1974–2004

Ida Di Benedetto (born 3 June 1945) is an Italian actress and producer.

== Biography ==
Born in Naples, Di Benedetto started her career working on stage with Roberto De Simone.

Di Benedetto appeared in more than 50 films and television shows between 1974 and 2004. She starred in the film The Whores, which was entered into the 1994 Cannes Film Festival. She won the Nastro d'Argento for Best Supporting Actress in 1981 for her supporting role as Maria Rosa in Fontamara from the same name novel by Ignazio Silone and the following year she won the Nastro d'Argento for Best Actress for Immacolata and Concetta: The Other Jealousy.

== Selected filmography ==
=== Producer ===
- The Fine Art of Love, directed by John Irvin (2006)

=== Cinema actress ===
- Il gioco della verità, directed by Michele Massa (1974)
- ...a tutte le auto della polizia, directed by Mario Caiano (1975)
- Fontamara, directed by Carlo Lizzani (1977)
- The Reign of Naples, directed by Werner Schroeter (1978)
- Immacolata e Concetta, directed by Salvatore Piscicelli (1980)
- Palermo or Wolfsburg, directed di Werner Schroeter (1980)
- Camera d'albergo, directed by Mario Monicelli (1981)
- Day of the Idiots, directed by Werner Schroeter (1981)
- Testa o croce, directed by Nanni Loy (1982)
- Più bello di così si muore, directed by Pasquale Festa Campanile (1982)
- Tradimento, directed by Alfonso Brescia (1982)
- Giuramento, directed by Alfonso Brescia (1982)
- Sleep of Reason, directed by Ula Stöckl (1984)
- The Incinerator, directed by Pier Francesco Boscaro dagli Ambrosi, (1984)
- Giuseppe Fava: Siciliano come me, directed by Vittorio Sindoni (1984)
- Noi tre, directed by Pupi Avati (1984)
- Guapparia, directed by Stelvio Massi (1984)
- Pizza Connection, directed by Damiano Damiani (1985)
- Mamma Ebe, directed by Carlo Lizzani (1985)
- La ballata di Eva, directed by Francesco Longo (1985)
- Blues metropolitano, directed by Salvatore Piscicelli (1985)
- Champagne amer, directed by Ridha Behi (1986)
- Regina, directed by Salvatore Piscicelli (1987)
- Ferdinando, Man of Love, directed by Memè Perlini (1990)
- Marcellino pane e vino, directed by Luigi Comencini (1991)
- The Whores, directed by Aurelio Grimaldi (1994)
- Oltremare - Non è l'America, directed by Nello Correale (1998)
- Quartetto, directed by Salvatore Piscicelli (2001)
- Rosa Funzeca, directed by Aurelio Grimaldi (2002)
- Alla fine della notte, directed by Salvatore Piscicelli (2003)
- Fratella e sorello, directed by Sergio Citti (2005)
- Leone nel basilico, directed by Leone Pompucci (2013)

=== Television actress ===
- Il marsigliese (1975)
- Storie della camorra, directed by Paolo Gazzara (1978)
- L'altro Simenon (1979)
- La mano sugli occhi (1979)
- L'eredità della priora, directed by Anton Giulio Majano (1980)
- L'indizio (1982)
- L'amante dell'Orsa Maggiore, directed by Anton Giulio Majano (1983)
- Sogni e bisogni, directed by Sergio Citti (1985)
- Un'isola, directed by Carlo Lizzani (1986)
- Losberg (1986)
- L'isola del tresoro, directed by Antonio Margheriti (1987)
- Quando ancora non c'erano i Beatles (1988)
- Mit den Clowns kamen die Tränen (1990)
- Morte a contratto, directed by Gianni Lepre (1993)
- Gioco perverso, directed by Italo Moscati (1993)
- Alles Glück dieser Erde (1994)
- L'ispettore Sarti (1994)
- Morte di una strega, directed by Cinzia TH Torrini (1995)
- I ragazzi del muretto, directed by Gianluigi Calderone (1996)
- Un posto al sole (1996-1998, 2000)
- Il bello delle donne, directed by Lidia Montanari, Luigi Parisi, Maurizio Ponzi e Giovanni Soldati (2002)
- Chiaroscuro, directed by Tomaso Sherman (2003)
- Madre come te, directed by Vittorio Sindoni (2004)
- Mannaggia alla miseria, directed by Lina Wertmüller (2010)
- Paura di amare, directed by Vincenzo Terracciano (2010)
- Paura di amare 2, directed by Vincenzo Terracciano (2013)
