= Francesco Vitiello =

Italian actor

Francesco Vitiello (born August 15, 1981) is an Italian actor. He was born in Torre del Greco in the Province of Naples.

== Filmography ==
=== Theatre ===
- I veri figli di Filomena M, directed by Enrico Maria Lamanna (1997)
- Corpus Cristi, directed by Enrico Maria Lamanna (1998)
- Se cantar mi fai d'amore, directed by Enrico Maria Lamanna (1999)
- Il letto, directed by Pino L'Abbate (2002)
- La capra, directed by Enrico Maria Lamanna (2004)
- Il cielo di Palestina, directed by Carlo Cerciello (2007)

=== Cinema ===
- Capo Nord, story, written and directed by Carlo Luglio (2002) - Opera prima
- Nemici per la pelle, opera prima di Rossella Drudi (2006)
- Viva Franconi, directed by Luca Verdone (2006)
- Liberarsi - Figli di una rivoluzione minore, opera prima di Salvatore Romano (2008)
- I petali dell'aurora, opera prima di Valerio Tramontano - 2007

=== Television ===
- Un posto al sole, registi vari - Soap opera - Rai Tre (1996-2002 e 2006-2009) - Role: Diego Giordano
- Distretto di Polizia 4, directed by Monica Vullo e Riccardo Mosca - Serie TV - Canale 5 (2003) - Role: Agente scelto Corrado Esposito
- Un posto al sole d'estate, various directors - Soap opera - Rai Tre (2007) - Role: Diego Giordano

=== Academic ===
- University of Surrey
- University of Nottingham
