= Bread and Wine (novel) =

1936 anti-fascist and anti-Stalinist novel by Ignazio Silone

- First edition
- Author: Ignazio Silone
- Original title: Brot und Wein
- Language: German
- Published: 1936
- Publication place: Switzerland
- English publication date: 1936
- Media type: Print

Bread and Wine is an anti-fascist and anti-Stalinist novel written by Ignazio Silone. It was finished while the author was in exile from Benito Mussolini's Italy. It was first published in 1936 in a German language edition in Switzerland as Brot und Wein, and in an English translation in London later the same year. An Italian version, Pane e vino, did not appear until 1937.

After the war, Silone completely revised the text, publishing a significantly different version in Italy (in 1955), reversing the title: Vino e pane (‘Wine and Bread’). This updated version is also available in English translation. Bread and Wine has been published as part of The Abruzzo Trilogy, which consists of three novels: Fontamara, Bread and Wine, and The Seed Beneath the Snow, in a translation by Eric Mosbacher, revised by Darina Silone (Steerforth Italia, 2000).

A play by Silone, Ed egli si nascose (1944), translated as And He Hid Himself, "was inspired by the author's novel Bread and Wine" (the translation states under its list of characters), the dust jacket of the translation states, "While the principal characters in this play are the same as those in Silone's Bread and Wine, this is not a dramatization of the novel."

== Synopsis ==
Pietro Spina is a young revolutionary who is being sought by authorities. He takes on the disguise of an old priest known as Don Paolo Spada. Pietro lives in Abruzzo, in village of Pietrasecca (Marsica), and is forced to pretend to be a priest, to avoid arousing suspicion. The fascist police are on his trail, and Pietro has only a few friends to rely on. Meanwhile, the young man is in contact with the sad reality of ignorant peasants of the village of Pietrasecca: he realizes that to make a revolution against fascism is always difficult, because the problem of the revolution is at its own root. In Abruzzo, there are many backward villages, such as Pietrasecca, where the laws of nature and the peasants are inviolable. Meanwhile, Pietro Spina falls in love with a girl but can not reveal his true identity.

== In music ==
German communist composer Hanns Eisler used Bread and Wine for seven cantatas, written in 1937, while he was staying with Bertolt Brecht in his Danish exile in Svendborg, despite Silone's being excommunicated from the official communist movement, and the Second Moscow Trial just taking place. Eisler did not use Silone's text verbatim but based his poetry on Silone's prose. When the scores of these cantatas were published in the 1950s in East Germany, Eisler dated their creation to 1935, although the novel had been published only in 1936.
