= Fontamara (film) =

- Directed by: Carlo Lizzani
- Written by: Carlo Lizzani
- Screenplay by: Carlo Lizzani; Lucio De Caro
- Story by: Ignazio Silone (novel)
- Produced by: Piero Lazzari; Edmondo Ricci
- Starring: Michele Placido; Imma Piro; Antonella Murgia; Ida Di Benedetto
- Cinematography: Mario Vulpiani
- Edited by: Franco Fraticelli
- Music by: Roberto De Simone
- Release date: 1980
- Running time: 139 minutes 205 minutes (extended TV cut – 4 episodes)
- Country: Italy
- Language: Italian

Fontamara is a 1980 Italian film, directed by Carlo Lizzani based on the novel of the same name by Ignazio Silone. It stars Michele Placido in the role of Berardo Viola and Antonella Murgia as Elvira. Ida Di Benedetto won the Nastro d'Argento (Silver Ribbon) for Best supporting Actress in 1981 for her supporting role as Maria Rosa.

== Plot ==
In 1929 in Abruzzo, in the mountain villages of Pescina and Fontamara, near Avezzano, the people are subjugated by the arrival of a team of fascists. The militiamen prove hostile, preventing citizens from obtaining supplies necessary to survive the imminent winter. The small Berardo is shocked by the rape of his mother by a fascist officer and is forced to go to Rome, meditating revenge. Ten years later, Berardo, in fact, now that he has become large, goes back from Rome to Abruzzo, and discovers that the country is still a victim of the abuse of fascism. The young communist tries to attack squadrons but is murdered.

== Cast ==
- Michele Placido as Berardo Viola
- Ida Di Benedetto as Maria Rosa
- Imma Piro as Maria Grazia
- Antonella Murgia as Elvira
