= Blues metropolitano =

1985 film

- Directed by: Salvatore Piscicelli
- Starring: Paolo Bonetti; Ida Di Benedetto; Barbara D'Urso; Tony Esposito; Peppe Lanzetta; Stefano Sabelli; James Sampson; Marina Suma; Marina Viro; Pino Daniele
- Cinematography: Giuseppe Lanci
- Edited by: Raimondo Crociani
- Music by: Joe Amoruso
- Release date: 1985
- Language: Italian

Blues metropolitano is a 1985 Italian musical comedy-drama film directed by Salvatore Piscicelli.

== Cast ==
- Marina Suma: Stella
- Ida Di Benedetto: Elena
- Barbara D'Urso: Francesca
- Stefano Sabelli: Tony Tarallo
- Tony Esposito: Tanino
- Paolo Bonetti: Gigino Giordano
- Maurizio Capone: Tex
- James Sampson: Solomon
- Pino Daniele: himself
- Tullio De Piscopo: himself
- Stefano Sarcinelli
- Renato De Rienzo: Assessore

== See also ==
- List of Italian films of 1985
