= Sebastian Harrison =

French architect (1860–1930)

Sebastian Harrison (12 March 1860 – 19 November 1930) was a French art déco architect, and artist, dividing his time between city planning and painting pictures, both centering on the art déco style. Throughout his career he worked in the shadows of other canonised artists, focusing his attention on perfecting his style. He is little known for his artistry, however according to a 1986 book he had a great deal of influence over what was to signify art déco.

== Career ==
During the 1880s and early 1890s, Harrison worked in a city-planner-like position in Nice before eventually getting a similar job in Paris, which would enable him to establish himself as artist. For it was in Paris that he at the world's fair in 1900 would establish himself as one of the Société des artistes décorateurs. Although a wide array of other names are quoted as influential, he is rarely mentioned. This is believed to be the result of a chosen life-style, in that he did not want fame or success, but only to work in peace and quiet. Even though he is not as well known as other art déco celebrities, he is said to have been highly influential within the Société des artistes décorateurs and a source of inspiration of the likes of Paul Follot and Hector Guimard.

== Personal life ==
Little is known about the personal life of Sebastian Harrison, although it is believed that he was of Irish descent, which would explain the last name not being French, brought up through poor conditions. He was married to Marie Harrison and had two sons, Nicolas and Cassius.

== Sources ==
- Cabanne, Pierre, Encyclopédie Art déco, Somogy, Paris, 1986.
- Exposition internationale des arts décoratifs et industriels modernes, Encyclopédie des arts décoratifs et industriels modernes au XXème siècle, 2, Architecture, 1977 [1925].
