= Italian Postcards =

1987 film

- Film poster
- Directed by: Memè Perlini
- Written by: Memè Perlini; Gianni Romoli
- Starring: Geneviève Page
- Cinematography: Carlo Carlini
- Edited by: Carlo Fontana
- Music by: Stefano Mainetti
- Release date: 1987
- Running time: 93 minutes
- Country: Italy
- Language: Italian

Italian Postcards (Italian: Cartoline italiane) is a 1987 Italian drama film directed by Memè Perlini. It was screened in the Un Certain Regard section at the 1987 Cannes Film Festival.

== Cast ==
- Geneviève Page
- Lindsay Kemp
- Christiana Borghi
- David Brandon
- Stefano Davanzati
- Antonello Fassari - Eugenio - il fantasista
- Rosa Fumetto
- Alessando Genesi
- Franco Piacentini
- Ines Carmona
- Maria Marchi
- Giovanna Bardi
- Isabella Martelli
