= Barbara De Rossi =

Italian actress

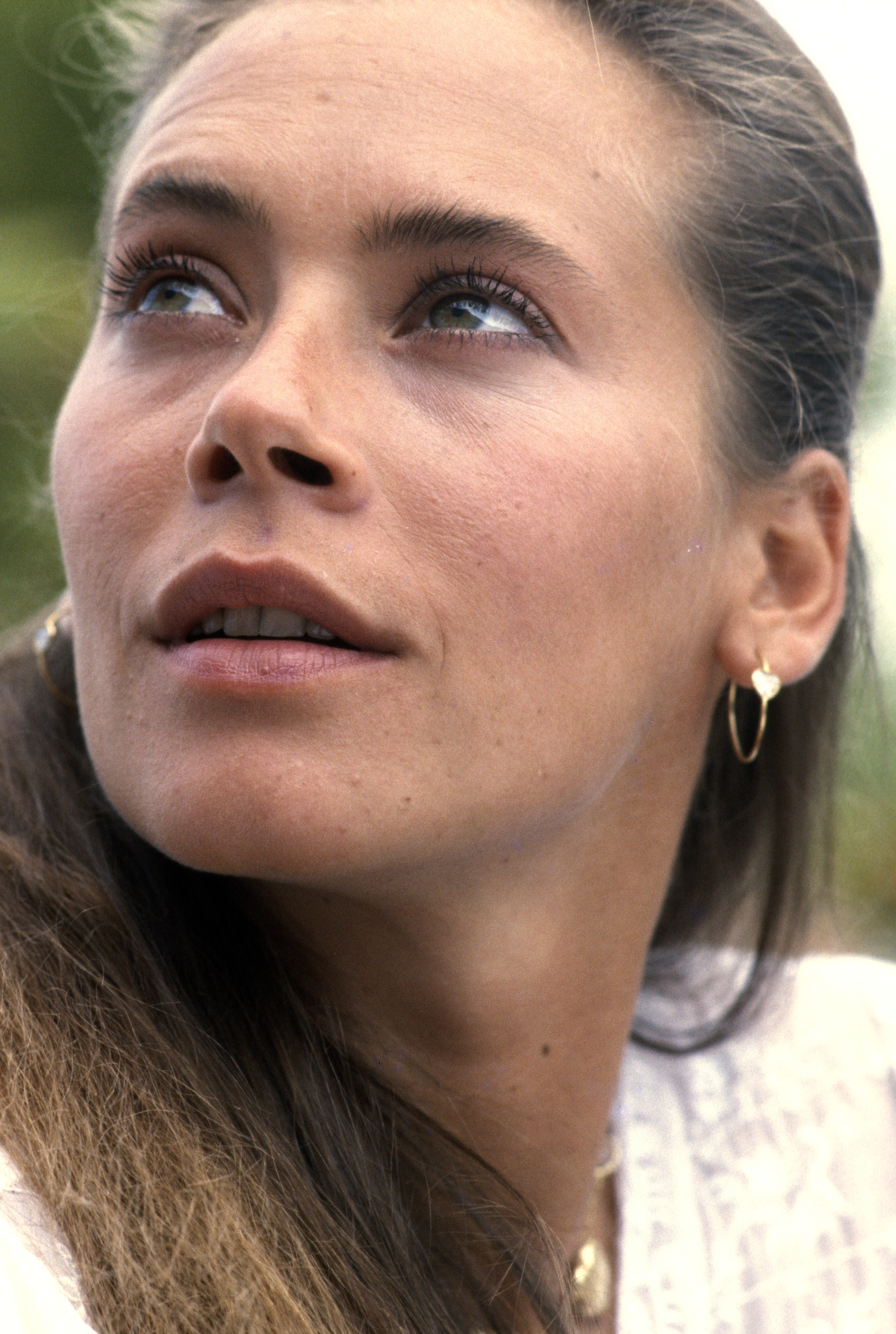
- Born: 9 August 1960 (age 66); Rome, Italy
- Occupation: Actress
- Spouses: Andrea Busiri Vici (m. 1988; div. 1990) Branislav Tesanovic (m. 1995; div. 2010) Simone Fratini (m. 2023)

Barbara De Rossi (born 9 August 1960) is an Italian actress who has combined a career in international cinema with longstanding popularity in Italian television.

== Early life and career ==
Barbara De Rossi was born in 1960 in Rome to an Italian wine importer and his German wife. She spent many of her early years in Rimini. At the age of 15, De Rossi was spotted by director Alberto Lattuada in a beauty contest. Her film debut was in Lattuada's Stay As You Are (1978), alongside Marcello Mastroianni and Nastasia Kinski. She went on to play Virna Lisi's screen daughter in La Cicala (The Cricket) in 1980, again directed by Lattuada. In 1983, she played Bradamante, the famous female warrior, in Hearts and Armour directed by Giacomo Battiato.

By the mid-1980s, De Rossi was gaining English-speaking roles such as the beautiful Greek slave girl Eunice in the TV miniseries Quo Vadis? and Claretta Petacci, Mussolini's mistress in the docudrama Mussolini and I alongside the actors Anthony Hopkins (Count Galeazzo Ciano) and Bob Hoskins (Mussolini). In 1990 she played Nys, a Montmartre prostitute, in Claude Chabrol's French-language film Quiet Days in Clichy, a dramatisation of Henry Miller's semiautobiographical novel based on his time in Paris. She has worked in film, theatre, and television since her debut, such as starring alongside Ray Lovelock in Raiuno's TV film Marco e Giulia – Inviati Speciali (Mark and Julia, Special Envoys).

In 1994, De Rossi shared the David di Donatello for Best Actress award with Asia Argento and Chiara Caselli for her part in the comic film Sentimental Maniacs. De Rossi has served as a judge on the junior talent show Ti lascio una canzone broadcast on Rai Uno since 2008.

== Personal life ==
In 1988, De Rossi married Andrea Busiri Vici, scion of a famous architectural dynasty. They divorced in 1990. She has a daughter from her second husband, the Serbian dancer Branislav "Branko" Tesanovic. She considers herself Roman Catholic. De Rossi is honorary president of "I Diritti Civili nel 2000", a civil-rights organization representing the interests of women and children.

== Filmography ==
Year	Title	Role	Notes
1978	Stay As You Are	Ilaria Marengo	
1980	The Cricket	Saveria, la figlia di Wilma	
1983	Son contento	Bradamante	
1983	Hearts and Armour	Bradamante	
1984	La piovra	Contessa Raffaella 'Titti' Pecci Scialoia	6 episodes
1985	Quo Vadis?	Eunice	6 episodes
1985	Mamma Ebe	Laura Bonetti	
1985	Mussolini and I	Claretta Petacci	4 episodes
1985	Juke box		
1986	Blood Ties	Louisa Masseria	TV movie
1987	Frankenstein's Aunt	Klara	7 episodes
1987	Sweets from a Stranger	Lena	
1987	Pehavý Max a strasidlá	Klára	
1987	Grosso guaio a Cartagena	Vanessa Valverde	
1987	Vado a riprendermi il gatto		
1988	Vampire in Venice	Helietta Canins	
1988	Angela come te	Angela	
1989	L'orchestre rouge	Georgie	
1990	Quiet Days in Clichy	Nys	
1990	Nel giardino delle rose	Sonia	
1992	Il giardino dei ciliegi	Vania	
1994	Sentimental Maniacs	Mara	
1995	Vörös Colibri	Anna	
1998	A Bedfull of Foreigners	Ursula Dieterman	
2003	Babiy Yar	Natalya Lerner	
2003	Il pranzo della domenica	Barbara Proietti	
2007	Matrimonio alle Bahamas	Maga	
2013	Universitari - Molto più che amici	Angela Mastropasqua	
2014	Con tutto l'amore che ho	Lisa's mother	
2016	Tutto può accadere nel villaggio dei miracoli	Dottoressa Anselmi	
2016	Il Criminologo	Grazia Deledda	
