= Shatterer =

- Directed by: Tonino Valerii
- Screenplay by: Yasuo Tanami; Ernesto Gastaldi; Tonino Valerii
- Produced by: Asao Kumada
- Starring: Koji Kikkawa; Andy J. Forest; Beatrice Ring; Marina Suma; Orazio Orlando
- Cinematography: Giulio Albonico
- Edited by: Antonio Siciliano
- Music by: Tot Taylor
- Production companies: Unachi Corporation S.r.l.; Watanabe Production/Film Select
- Distributed by: Toho
- Release dates: 13 June 1987 (Japan); 1992 (Italy)
- Running time: 110 minutes
- Countries: Japan; Italy; Switzerland

Shatterer (Japanese: シャタラー, Hepburn: Shataraa) is a 1987 film directed by Tonino Valerii.

== Production ==
Shatterer was produced with Japanese funding. Producer Asao Kumada got in contact with director Tonino Valerii after being suggested to him by Peter Shepherd. Shepherd had previously met with Valerii on the set of The Best of Enemies and again on Day of Anger where he was Giuliano Gemma's dialogue coach.

Valerii did not like Kumada's story for the film involving the mafia taking over a nearly bankrupt steel mill that is saved by a Japanese team. Valerii stated that it was absurd for the mafia to attempt to take over a company that was at a loss and read about a car engine that would work for less fuel was being tested on and suggested Kumada to make a story about that. Valerii stated that "it was an unlikely story, but it worked well in Japan." Beatrice Ring was cast in the film, but was not the first choice for the role. She had the interview with Tonino Valerii right after finishing work on Lamberto Bava's film Graveyard Disturbance. On working with Kikkawa, who was a popular star in Japan at the time, Ring stated that he had limited English and felt bad for him on set.

Shooting for the film took place in early 1987 at Empire Studios in Rome and later in Sicily. Co-production requirements demanded a Japanese lead, which was played by singer Koji Kikkawa which was meant to be a stepping stone into the Western market. Japanese sources state that Kikkawa was originally cast as the films hero, but his role was changed during film and after the death of executive producer Shin Watanabe, Valerii changed the story and gave more screen time to Forest. Forest denied this.

== Release ==
Shatterer was released in Japan on 13 June 1987 where it was distributed by Toho. The film was apparently dubbed into English and presented with Japanese subtitles for this release. According to Ring, the response in Japan was of disappointment because of prominent amount of screen time for Forest and lack of screen time for Kikkawa.

The film was not submitted to the Italian board of censors, but was broadcast on Italian television in 1992 as the Sicilian Connection.

The soundtrack was released by Sounds Marketing System.
