= Un posto al sole =

Italian television soap opera

- Genre: Soap opera
- Created by: Wayne Doyle; Gino Ventriglia; Adam Bowen; Michele Zatta
- Directed by: Bruno De Paola
- Starring: Luisa Amatucci; Alberto Rossi; Giorgia Gianetiempo; Germano Bellavia; Antonella Prisco; Francesco Vitiello; Ilenia Lazzarin; Marina Giulia Cavalli; Patrizio Rispo; Marzio Honorato; Luca Turco; Marina Tagliaferri; Manuel D'Angelo; Gennaro De Simone; Daniela Ioia; Luigi Miele; Vladimir Randazzo; Maurizio Aiello; Gina Amarante; Miriam Candurro; Michelangelo Tommaso; Nina Soldano; Riccardo Polizzy Carbonelli; Whoopi Goldberg
- Theme music composer: Antonio Annona
- Country of origin: Italy
- Original language: Italian
- No. of seasons: 31
- No. of episodes: 7,260

Production
- Producer: Pasquale Persico
- Production location: Naples
- Cinematography: Alberto Di Vaio, Antonio Robustelli
- Editor: Raffaele Landolfi
- Running time: 20 minutes
- Production companies: Rai Fiction; FremantleMedia Italia; Centro di produzione Rai di Napoli

Original release
- Network: Rai 3
- Release: 21 October 1996 – present

Un posto al sole (English: A Place in the Sun) is an Italian soap opera which has been broadcast by Rai 3 since 1996. It is set in a fictional apartment building called Palazzo Palladini, located seaside in the Naples neighborhood of Posillipo. Un posto al sole is the first soap opera ever produced in Italy, and the longest running.

It is an original series created by Wayne Doyle, Adam Bowen and Gino Ventriglia with the collaboration of Michele Zatta, and it employs similar production methods to the Australian soap opera Neighbours from the same original producers Reg Grundy Organisation/Fremantle. American comedian Conan O'Brien appeared in a cameo on the show in 2018. American actress Whoopi Goldberg appeared in 20 episodes at the beginning of 2026.

Episode 7260 of Un posto al sole will air on 6 August 2027.
