= Ilenia Lazzarin =

Italian screen actress

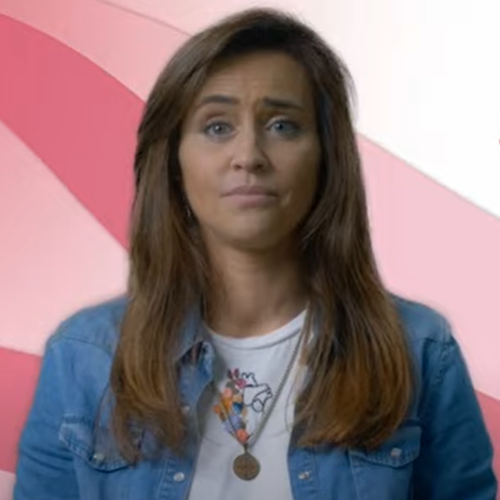
Italian actress Ilenia Lazzarin in 2022

Ilenia Lazzarin (born 6 September 1982 in Busto Arsizio, Province of Varese, Lombardy) is an Italian screen actress.

Her most prominent role is the character Viola Bruni in the Neapolitan television soap opera Un Posto al Sole (also known as A Place in the Sun).

== Biography ==
Born in Busto Arsizio, she has lived in Vercelli since the age of 11.

In 2001, she moved to Naples, where she graduated in education at the Suor Orsola Benincasa University of Naples.

In 2001 she joined the cast of the Rai 3 Soap opera Un posto al sole, in which she played the role of Viola Bruni.

She began her career working in Advertising for the website Clarence. Made her debut as the protagonist, in the role of Samantha, in Gilberto Squizzato's Atlantis (2000), a four-hour real movie broadcast in four episodes by Rai 1, based on the true story of a girl mother, with Maurizio Tabani and Roberta Potrich.

In 2001 she participated in the TV miniseries Le ali della vita 2, directed by Stefano Reali, with Virna Lisi and Sabrina Ferilli. In 2002 she played the role of Dari in the film Due gemelle a Roma, directed by Steve Purcell, with Mary-Kate and Ashley Olsen.

In 2006 she was in the cast of Un posto al sole d'estate, the summer version of the Rai 3 soap opera. Between 2010 and 2011 she shot some commercials in Miami and participated in the Rai 1 dramas Un passo dal cielo with Terence Hill and Fuoriclasse with Luciana Littizzetto.

In 2016 and 2017, she hosted the second and third editions of The Farmer Seeks a Wife, aired on Sky, respectively.

== Television and video work ==
- Atlantis (television film; 2000) as Samantha
- Le Ali della Vita 2 (television film; 2001)
- Un Posto al Sole (television series; since 2001) as Viola Bruni
- When in Rome (direct-to-video film; 2002) as Dari
