= Fontamara =

1933 novel by Ignazio Silone

- First edition (in German), 1933, cover by Max Bill
- Author: Ignazio Silone
- Translator: Nettie Sutro
- Language: Italian
- Series: Abruzzo Trilogy
- Genre: Political novel, realist novel
- Publisher: Oprecht & Hebling
- Publication date: 1933
- Publication place: Switzerland
- English publication date: 1934
- Media type: Print
- OCLC: 854824087
- Followed by: Bread and Wine

Fontamara ([fontaˈmaːra]) is a 1933 novel by the Italian author Ignazio Silone, written when he was a refugee from Fascist Italy in Switzerland. It is Silone's first novel and it is regarded as his most famous work. It received worldwide acclaim and sold more than a million and a half copies in twenty-seven languages. It was first published in German translation in Switzerland in 1933; English translation was published by Penguin Books in September 1934. In 1980, it was adapted by Carlo Lizzani into an eponymous film.

Appearing on the eve of the Spanish Civil War, and published just a few months after Adolf Hitler came to power, when the world was beginning to take sides for or against Fascism, the novel had a galvanising effect on public opinion. Fontamara became "the very symbol of resistance", and is "widely agreed to have played a major role as a document of anti-Fascist propaganda outside Italy in the late 1930s", as it criticises the immorality and deceit of the Fascist party and its followers.

Fontamara is a fictional village in Marsica in the Abruzzo region; its name is derived from the Italian Fonte Amara (Bitter Stream). The people (the Fontamaresi) are poor, and the village is so remote that they are unaware of major social upheavals such as the rise of Fascism. There is a tremendous gap between the cafoni (peasants) who populate Fontamara and those who live in the city. The Fontamaresi work the earth to survive, turn to emigration as a means of economic improvement and are isolated, ignorant of events happening outside of the region and untouched by modernity and new technology. The Impresario, in stark contrast to the Fontamaresi, who have laboured for centuries to little avail, has quickly become the richest man in the region and embodies the power, authority and immorality of the Fascists. The Fontamaresi are exploited due to their naïvety and ignorance, the women are raped by the Blackshirts, Berardo Viola makes the ultimate sacrifice to allow the continued distribution of clandestine texts that spread the word about socialism and encourage rebellion against Fascism, and at the end the majority of the population are killed at the hands of the Government.

As with many rural novels, Fontamara discusses the various seasons, and seasonal duties, such as the grape harvest in the vineyards. It is a choral novel that focuses on the lives and points of view of the peasants of Fontamara, deprived of hope yet persistent and determined. It depicts solidarity amongst the peasants and the inequality of wealth between the agricultural workers and the professional classes in the city.

== Background ==
Silone was a founding member of the Italian Communist Party (PCI) in 1921. Silone became one of its covert leaders during the rule of the National Fascist Party. Ignazio's brother Romolo Tranquilli was arrested in 1929 for being a member of the PCI. Romolo was not a militant; he was, in Silone's words, 'a vaguely anti-fascist young man whose education and feelings were Catholic... Why did he confess he was a Communist? Why did he affirm his confession before the judge of a special tribunal which used his confession to condemn him to 12 years in prison? He wrote to me: "I have tried to act as I thought you would have in my place".' Romolo is thought to be the inspiration for the character of Berardo Viola who heroically sacrifices himself. Romolo died in prison in 1931 as a result of the severe beatings he received.

Silone left Italy in 1927 on a mission to the Soviet Union and settled in Switzerland in 1930. He was expelled from the PCI after declaring his opposition to Joseph Stalin and the leadership of the Comintern. He suffered tuberculosis and severe clinical depression and spent a year in Swiss clinics. As he recovered, he began writing Fontamara.

A Penguin edition of Fontamara was distributed at British Prisoner of War camps during World War II. The front cover is shown here with its inside cover which gives details of the Prisoners of War Book Service.

The novel was published in Zurich, Switzerland in Spring 1933 in German translation by Nettie Sutro as a book and in various German language Swiss periodicals. It was published in English by Penguin Books in September 1934. The first version in Italian appeared in Paris in 1933, though it was not published in Italy until 1945, when Silone prepared a much changed version for publication in Ernesto Buonaiuti's Roman newspaper 'Il Risveglio', and in 1947 another edition, with further revisions, was published by the editing house Lo Faro, Rome. In 1949 Mondadori published the novel, with still further modifications, and Silone made further stylistic changes in the 1953 Mondadori publication. An Esperanto version was published in 1939 in the Netherlands. Surprisingly, despite Silone's sharp break with Stalinism, the book was also published in Russian in 1935 in the Soviet Union, although it has never been republished in Russian afterwards.

The United States Army printed unauthorised versions of Fontamara, along with Bread and wine, and distributed them to the Italians during the Liberation of Italy in 1943−1945. Fontamara was distributed in November 1942 by the Penguin "Forces Book Club" and at British Prisoner of War camps during World War II by The Prisoners of War Book Service, which was launched in March 1943.

== Plot ==
One night, three people from Fontamara − a mother, father and son − tell an exiled writer about various things which had happened in their village. The writer decides to turn these into a book. The mother, father and son therefore become the narrators, though the majority of the book is narrated by the father. Cav. Pelino arrives in the village and tricks the cafoni into signing a petition that would deviate the watercourse away from Fontamara and thus away from the fields in which they work. The Fontamaresi are initially reluctant but they sign the blank pieces of paper he gives them. He places another sheet on the top of the pile which says The undersigned, in support of the above, supply their signatures spontaneously, voluntarily and with enthusiasm for Cav. Pelino ( p. 37).

On their way to the fields the men see workers deviating the watercourse. A boy delivers the news to the village and the women go to the regional capital city to protest. They don't realize that under the new regime the sindaco (mayor) is now the podestà and are taken to the house of the Impresario (a wealthy businessman) where, after much deliberation and fruitless trips elsewhere to find him, they are again deceived, because Don Circonstanza and the Impresario persuade them to accept an (impossible) three-quarter/three-quarter split of the water. The Impresario has also taken the tratturo (flat land owned by the community that is used for migration of sheep). Berardo Viola wants to emigrate to America but is prevented by new emigration laws. He had sold his land to Don Circonstanza to fund his emigration but now, with no land, is known as il cafone senza terra (the peasant without land) and is unemployed and, because of his pride, feels unfit to marry Elvira – a Madonna-like character whom he loves. ( p. 102). Cav. Pelino informs the government that the Fontamaresi are not cooperating (through ignorance) with the new Fascist regime and Innocenzo la Legge comes to impose a curfew, which will severely inhibit their work, and forbid talk of politics in public places. Berardo makes a speech against Innocenzo who is humiliated and who then spends the night with Marietta.

The cafoni are summoned to a meeting in Avezzano to discuss the matter of Fucino (an extremely fertile area of land), and are yet again deceived when instead of having a discussion, the land is taken from them and given to the rich ( p. 130). Some of them miss the truck home and meet a man who takes them to a tavern and offers to help them with their uprising and bring them weapons but, whilst he is gone, the Solito Sconosciuto approaches them to warn them they are being set up. Back at Fontamara, trucks of Fascist soldiers arrive and gang rape the women of Fontamara whilst the men are working in the fields. When the men return the Fascists question them, asking "Long Live who?" but the Fontamaresi do not know what answer they are supposed to give. The attackers see Elvira at the bell tower, mistake her for the Madonna and flee. Berardo and Giuva find Elvira and Matala at the top of the bell tower. Berardo picks Elvira up in his arms, takes her home and spends the night with her. In the morning he is even more determined to marry her, and Giuva thinks the only way Berardo could earn enough money to buy some land is by getting a job in town.

The Impresario buys the cafoni's wheat whilst it is still green for 120 lire a hundredweight, knowing that the prices are about to be increased under a new law to 170 lire and therefore makes a substantial profit which should have gone to the Fontamaresi. He also introduces wage reductions which reduce wages to 40% and 25% for land-betterment work. Don Circonstanza tricks them again, telling them that the water will be returned not after 50 years but after 10 lustri (5-year periods) ( p. 181-2), as the ‘’cafoni’’ do not know what a lustro is. The younger people of Fontamara want Berardo to rebel with them but he refuses. Teofilo, one of Berardo's young followers, hangs himself from the bell rope at the belltower. Berardo and the younger narrator go to Rome, looking for work. They enlist the help of lawyer Don Achille Pazienza, a guest at the Locanda del Buon Ladrone (The Good Thief's Inn) ( p.200) who also tries to exploit them. Whilst they are in Rome they find out through a telegram that Elvira has died. They meet the Solito Sconosciuto once more and go to a café where they are set up by the police and arrested for having clandestine papers against the Fascist regime. Both the young narrator and Berardo are tortured in prison and Berardo sacrifices himself, pretending he is the Solito Sconosciuto in order for the rebellion to continue and so that people hear about what has happened in Fontamara. The Solito Sconosciuto publishes an article, "Long Live Berardo Viola", which tells the story of Fontamara and he passes on printing equipment ("the duplicating machine") to the ‘’Fontamaresi’’ so they can start their own local anti-Fascist newspaper, which they call Che fare? (Italian title of Lenin's work What Is To Be Done?). The three narrators go to visit the wife's family in San Giuseppe to celebrate the son's release and distribute papers there. On their way home they hear gunshots, and a passerby informs them there's a war at Fontamara. Almost everyone has died "those who could, fled. Those who could, escaped". They then cross the border with the help of the Solito Sconosciuto.

== Characters ==
As a choral novel there is not one protagonist, but there are characters who are mentioned more than others such as Berardo, and the three narrators who tell the story.

=== The Three Narrators ===
The book is narrated by Giuvà, his wife, and his son, who alternate the narration. The father is known as Giuvà, a dialect version of Giovanni. He is a poor peasant who searches for work. He is ignorant and easily duped like the other cafoni but doesn't react in the way that Berardo does, even though he admires what Berardo does. He is a friend to all and only fights with his brother-in-law over the water. He seems more and more surprised about the events that unfold in Fontamara, which had been a quiet town where nothing seemed to change.

The wife of Giuvà comes to be known as Matalè (dialect version of Maddalena). She wants to fight against injustice and thus walks to the city with the other women to protest about the water being redirected away from Fontamara. She shows courage and supports Elvira, her niece, when the women are being raped and the police do nothing. She often says "When strange things begin to happen, no one can stop them."

We are not told the name of the son and he is only referred to as the child. He recounts the journey to Rome with Berardo and Berardo's death. Like the other young people he admired Berardo. His character seems similar to that of his father, always trying to find work, but he is duped by the police into saying that Berardo was suicidal, thereby inadvertently absolving them of blame for killing him.

=== Berardo ===
Berardo is the spokesman of the people. He is brave and rebellious, willing to give his life for a friend, but he is unfortunate. He is bitter about a betrayal by a friend in the past. He was disgusted by a betrayal, like he said, by a man whom he considered a friend, who he had known as a soldier and with whom he had broken bread on many occasions and had a very close friendship ( p. 89). He is much admired by the young people of Fontamara who are heavily influenced by his speeches and his way of thinking, and he is the heart of their vice club meetings. They say of him In the end we all love Berardo. He also had his faults, especially as a drunk, but he was loyal and sincere and he was very unfortunate, and for this, of good heart, we wish he could have rebuilt the earth ( p. 93). His physical description seems to be at odds with his rebellious character. From his grandfather, according to the eldest villagers who still remember, he had a certain inherited physical strength: a tall stature, thick as the trunk of an oak, bull neck and a short, square head, but his eyes were good: as an adult he had kept the eyes he had as a boy. It was incomprehensible, even ridiculous, that a man of that force could have the eyes and the smile of a child ( p. 95). He is described almost as a hero. He did not leave unpunished any unfairness from the regional capital ( p. 95) and he is known for his acts of violence when it comes to injustice. when we were sent a donkey instead of a priest, the pipes that take the water to Fossa were broken in several places. Another time the concrete mile marker stones along the national highway were smashed over an area of ten miles. Signposts indicating directions and distances for drivers generally did not remain in position for long. And so when the electric light failed at Fontamara for the first time...all the lamps along the roads connecting the local town with neighbouring villages were smashed. He also suggests that instead of demanding the return of their water from the Impresario, the Fontamaresi should set fire to his tannery...if he doesn't understand, set fire to his timberyard...blow up his brickworks. And if he's a fool and still doesn't understand, burn down his villa at night while he's in bed with Donna Rosalia. He also sets fire to the fence built by the Impresario around his new land, and the roadsweeper guarding it ends up going to prison.

He is in love with Elvira but does not think himself good enough to marry her because he does not own a piece of land. However, if anyone sought to marry her, he would punch them. After a long struggle with injustice he realises that everything he does is useless and that the enemy is too powerful. He refuses to help in a rebellion and goes to Rome to find work.

Berardo's mother, Maria Rosa, is poor and despairs of him when she sees his field destroyed by the flood and because she wants to see her son married to Elvira. She spends most of her days, and even her nights during the summer, on a stone at the entrance of her house, which was actually a cave. She spun and sewed and waited for her son to return. Not being able to excel in wealth, Maria Rosa found it inevitable that he would at least excel in misfortune ( p. 100)

=== Elvira ===
Elvira works as a dyer and is the daughter of Matalè's sister Nazzarena who died a year before. A beautiful, Madonna-like character, More than beautiful, She was a gentile, delicate creature of medium height, with a serene, sweet face, no-one had ever heard her laugh out loud or even cackle or squirm in public, or cry. She had extraordinary modesy and reserve ( p. 102). She is known in Fontamara as destined to marry Berardo, though he doesn't propose to her due to lack of land and money, whilst Elivira has a vast dowry and trousseau. - a thousand in cash and sheets, pillowcases, tablecloths, shirts, blankets, a new cupboard, two walnut drawers and a bedstead made from two pieces of brass, all bought and paid for. ( p. 102) When the girl went to the church or to the fountain, Berardo turned pale and held his breath to see her and he followed her with his eyes in such a way as to leave no doubt about his feeling. And as this intense attention from Berardo had become so well known amongst Elivira's friends, and she had not complained, or even changed her routine or the time of her outings( p. 102) She is a simple and modest girl, almost considered a saint, insomuch as no one would blaspheme or swear when she approached; on one occasion she saves the Fontamaresi looking out from the belltower because the police think she is the Madonna and flee. On a pilgrimage she asks the Madonna to take her life and to help Berardo in return. Her prayers are granted and she dies in bed from a high fever.

=== Don Circostanza ===
Don Circostanza is the real enemy of the people of Fontamara, even though he is known as L'Amico del Popolo (the friend of the people) ( p. 74), always greets them one by one, and shouts Long live my Fontamaresi. He is a lawyer and does nothing but cheat them and always acts in favour of the most powerful. He can be read as a caricature of the role played by a large part of the professional class under Fascism, for instance those lawyers and accountants who purported to represent the workers in wage negotiations and accept wage reductions on their behalf. Physically he is described as With a melon hat, a spongy porous nose, ears like fans and belly at the third stage (of his concertina trousers) ( p. 73) and regarding his character, Giuvà says in his narration that he always had a goodwill for the people of Fontamara, he was our Protector, and talk of him would require a long litany. He has always been our defence but also our downfall. All the disputes of Fontamara passed through his office. And most of the chickens and eggs of Fontamara over 40 years ended up in Don Circostanza's kitchen ( p. 73). The author describes how he cheats the villagers. In order to get votes in elections, he sent a teacher to teach the cafoni to write his name so that In this way when they went to vote, not knowing what to write, they would write his name on their ballot paper. To get even more votes, as he was the one to register a death, when someone died he paid the family five francs and kept the names on the electoral roll and voted for them. "The living betray me, Don Circostanza reproached me bitterly, but the blessed souls of the departed remain faithful to me." Another scam is when they are discussing the water, he says that the water will be returned not after 50 years but after 10 lustri (5-year periods) ( p. 183), knowing that the 'cafoni' don't know how long a lustro is. He also buys Berardo's piece of land at a very low price when Berardo is hoping to go to America, even though he knows that the emigration laws have come into effect and knows that Berardo will not in fact be able to emigrate. He also decreases the worker's pay in Fontamara to 40% under the new law.

=== Impresario ===
A wealthy businessman, called The Contractor in many English translations. He is an enemy of the people of Fontamara. The cafoni see him as a person of authority who makes himself rich through scams. The first description of him shows his evil nature and how he can create wealth from anything. Gossip aside, there was no doubt that this extraordinary man had found America in our district. He had found the recipe to make gold out of pins. Someone said he had sold his soul to the devil in exchange for wealth, and perhaps he was right. Anyway, after the police investigation of the banknotes, the impresario's authority grew enormously. He represented the Bank. He had at his disposal a large factory producing banknotes. The previous owners began to tremble before him. With all this, we don't know how he could have turned down the position of mayor ( p. 60). In another description by Matalè, we see that even though the Fontamaresi hated him, they could not help admiring him and when they see him arrive they sense that he is a powerful character and they feel uneasy. However he does not listen to them nor take their views into consideration because he sees them as inferior to him. He approached, talking animatedly with some of the workers, he was in his work clothes, with his jacket over his arm, a water level in one hand, a folding ruler protruding from his trouser pocket, shoes whitened with lime. No-one, who did not know him, would have supposed that he was the richest man in the region and the new head of the town ( p. 71). There is a banquet held at his house to celebrate his appointment to podestà, which he refuses to attend claiming to be too busy and says to his wife that the guests won't be offended. I know them. Give them drink, give them plenty to drink, and they won't be offended.

=== Solito Sconosciuto (Mystery Man) ===
The Solito Sconosciuto is a rebel, conspiring against the government and producing clandestine newspapers denouncing scoundrels, inciting workers to strike and citizens to disobey. The Fontamaresi meet him first in the café, referred to as '‘sconosciuto'’ in the text, on the way back from Avezzano. He warns them that they are being set up by a man offering to give them weapons for their uprising. Berardo and the younger narrator then meet him in prison in Rome. He talks to them about the government and his socialist point of view during the night. The narrator does not hear everything that is said because he falls asleep. Although Berardo is innocent, he decides to sacrifice himself and tell the police that he is the Solito Sconosciuto in order to allow the true Solito Sconosciuto to continue his propaganda. The Solito Sconosciuto publishes an article which tells the story of Fontamara and passes on printing equipment to the Fontamaresi so that they can start their own local anti-Fascist newspaper, which they call Che fare? At the end of the book, the Solito Sconosciuto helps the survivors of the war to cross the border.

=== Don Abbacchio ===
Literally 'Mr Lamb', Don Abbacchio is the corrupt priest of Fontamara and the surrounding small villages. He is seen as a personification of the Church's betrayal of the people in signing the Concordat (also known as the Lateran Treaty) with the Fascist State in 1929. He only holds mass in Fontamara if the villagers pay him to, and he raises his price every time. He always favours the powerful and uses his sermons to blame the villagers for not paying taxes. The author's description of him is similar to that of Don Circostanza's as both will allow themselves to be compromised for a good meal, and they have their fill of food and drink.In front of everyone, Don Abbacchio stands up, fat, and puffing, the veins in his neck swollen, his face flushed, his eyes half-closed in a blissful expression. The canonized priest can hardly stand due to his drunkenness and begins to relieve himself against a tree in the garden, leaning his head against the tree so he doesn't fall ( p. 70). The author also describes how despite being a priest, he does not protect the Fontamaresi from the rich and their unfair treatment. He was not a bad man, but weak, fearful, and not to be trusted in serious matters. He was certainly not a pastor able to risk his life to defend his flock against wolves, but he was educated enough in his religion to explain how, from the moment God created wolves, he recognised that from time to time they had the right to devour some sheep. We resorted to him for sacraments, but we knew, through experience, to not get help or advice from him for the misfortunes that came from the malice of the rich and the authorities ( p. 172).

=== Don Carlo Magna and Donna Clorinda ===
Don Carlo Magna was the richest man of the village before the Impresario arrived. He too was a swindler and came to be known as 'magna' not in the sense of great, but because whenever someone was looking for him the maid said he was eating. This was a device of his mistress (Donna Clorinda) that enabled her to keep an eye on every detail of his affairs. He had inherited a large fortune from his ancestors but wasted it away. As don Carlo Magna was a known joker, womaniser, gambler, drunkard, glutton, and a weak and fearful man, it would have taken him a long time to squander the inheritance left to him by his father (...) He married late in life and donna Clorinda was unable to salvage the remains of the wreck that was his life. From the numerous and vast lands that his ancestors had collected, and from buying back assets seized by the church and monasteries at a low price that even good Christians would not dare to buy back, only a small amount of land was left. At one time, don Carlo Magna possessed almost the entire region of Fontamara and, of our young girls, those he liked the most were forced to go into service in his house and be subjected to his whims, but now nothing was left for him but the land from his wife's dowry( p. 65). If it wasn't for his wife donna Clorinda, he wouldn't have anything. She is the one who manages the affairs of the cafoni. She dresses in black with lace. Looking her in the face and hearing her speak you can see why in the village she was nicknamed The Raven ( p. 65) It seems she is truly on the side of the cafoni, as when they explain the situation with the water, she is pale as if she is about to faint. On her gaunt face you can see, in her stiffened jaws, the effort to hold back tears of rage. ( p. 66) She also appears when Baldissera goes to Sulmona, where a revolution has started against their own Impresario. She had been praying to Saint Antonio so that something might happen to the Impresario and when she meets Baldissera she takes it as a sign saying During my prayers this morning the saint directed me. He said "I can do nothing for you. Only the people of Fontamara can give the brigand the lesson he deserves". She also hints that if the people of Fontamara need anything, such as gasoline or arms, for instance, they could have it, provided they applied through some trustworthy person.

=== Cav. Pelino ===
Cav. Pelino (Cav. is short for Cavaliere - knight) tricks the Fontamaresi into signing the petition for the watercourse to be deviated, which will ultimately be their downfall. He is presented as a dandy: In appearance he was a young elephant. He had a delicate, shaven face, a dainty pink mouth, like a cat. With one hand he held his bicycle by the handlebars and his hand was small, and slimy, like the belly of lizards, and on one finger he wore a large ring, of His Excellency. He wore white spats on his shoes ( p. 32). He too is present later when the Fontamaresi go to the city to protest against the division of water and it is decided that one quarter of the water should go to Fontamara and three quarters to the Impresario. He helps the Impresario to get possession of it.

=== Don Ciccone ===
Don Ciccone is a lawyer, and is another of the men corrupted by a banquet at the Impresario's house. The wife describes how don Ciccone loses his job as he exits the Impresario's house, The lawyer followed after don Ciccone, holding a young man by the arm; he was blind-drunk and we saw him fall to his knees in his own urine behind the pile of bricks ( p. 70)

=== Innocenzo la Legge ===
Innocenzo is a tax collector and helps the authorities enforce laws in Fontamara. He first appears in the first chapter, as they say he used to hand out the warnings that the electricity would be cut off. A carter in a nearby town hints that if he returns he will be shot. He is always badly treated by the Fontamaresi who cannot pay the taxes and is almost always in the company of the rich and powerful, so much so that he is reduced to a servant by the Impresario's wife. He arrives in Fontamara because cav. Pelino had reported talk against the government and the Church, and new laws are put into place. There is a curfew for the Fontamaresi, which severely disadvantages them because they need to be up early to work in the fields, and he puts up a sign forbidding talk of politics in public places. In this place is it forbidden to talk of politics ( p. 133) Berardo makes a speech against Innocenzo saying that if they cannot speak they cannot reason and if they cannot reason they cannot live, and with that a humiliated Innocenzo returns to the main city.

=== Don Achille Pazienza ===
Don Achille Pazienza is a knight, and a guest at the Locanda del Buon Ladrone (The Good Thief's Inn) ( p. 200) where the youngest narrator and Berardo stay in Rome. He pretends to help Giuvà's son and Berardo to find a job but really is just trying to make money and steal their food and pretends he will give them everything they ask. But the trickster takes their money and doesn't find them a job. Giuvà's son describes him in the room in the inn as a sick old man lying on his bed We found don Achille Pazienza lying on the bed, he was a poor old man with catarrh, with a 10-day-old beard, a yellow suit, white canvas shoes, a straw hat on his head, a bronze medal on his chest and a toothpick in his mouth, and he had put on these ceremonial garments to receive us ( p. 206)

=== Prince Torlonia ===
The family of Torlonia arrived in Rome at the beginning of the last century in the wake of a French regiment and was originally called Torlogne. None of them have ever touched the soil, even for pleasure, but their holdings have extended into a lucrative realm of many tens of thousands of acres, and In return for Torlogne's political support of the weak Piedmontese dynasty...he was given the title of duke and later that of prince. Prince Torlonia features highly on the cafoni's view of the hierarchy, explained by Michele:
At the head of everything is God, the Lord of Heaven. Everyone knows that. Then comes Prince Torlonia, lord of the earth.
Then come Prince Torlonia's guards
Then come Prince Torlonia's guard's dogs
Then, nothing at all.
Then, nothing at all.
Then, nothing at all.
Then come the cafoni. And that's all

=== Villagers ===
Marietta is a widow, and is pregnant for the third or fourth time since her husband's death. Her husband was a war hero and in addition to a pension he had left her a silver medal, but probably not the three or four pregnancies ( p. 33) . She will not remarry because she would stop receiving her dead husband's pension. Since the war she had had meetings with people of consequence but they had stopped sending for her because of her three or four pregnancies.
La Zappa is a goat herder that the women meet on their way to the Impresario's house. He has come to protest because the Impresario has taken the tratturo. He says Does that land belong to the Impresario? In that case he must own the very air we breathe.
Baldissera, also known as General Baldissera, he is a resident of Fontamara and is a shoemaker. He often bickers with Berardo. He is a proud man who will do anything to conceal his poverty. General Baldissera was very poor, maybe the poorest of all the people of Fontamara, but he did not want it to be well-known and resorted to little tricks to hide his hunger that had devoured him for many years. Among other things, he used the most bizarre excuses to get away from Fontamara on Sundays and returned in the evening, in reality, more than ever starving hungry and sober, but with a toothpick between his teeth and wobbling, like someone who had eaten meat and drank until they were drunk, to appear as if he were in the position to spend and indulge his whims ( p. 86)

== Language and style ==
Silone writes in a very simple and readable style. Linguistically the Paratactic construction prevails with simple and colloquial language that reflects the simplicity of the cafoni, whereas the more educated and affluent characters express themselves in a much more refined manner, using quotations and Latin vocabulary. A subtle irony, at times, diffuses the tragedy as jokes and abuse reveal the naïvety of the Fontamaresi. The Fontamaresi do not speak standard Italian, but rather their own dialect, and find it difficult to understand people who come from the city. The narrator says he will write Fontamara in the language we learnt at school (i.e. Italian) in order that as many people will understand the text as possible.

== Themes ==
=== Description of peasantry ===
In Fontamara, Silone captures the fatigue and misery of the peasants and agricultural workers, which had previously been relatively undocumented. For the first time in Italian literature, peasants were the protagonists and their agricultural activities are described in great detail through the seasons. In 1929, when the story is set, the survival of peasants depended on subsistence agriculture on the land of the large landowners. Harvests varied day to day, food was not guaranteed and wages were low. Their land is very important to them and it is said that the relationship of a peasant to his land is a serious thing, like that between a husband and wife. It's a kind of sacrament. The misery of peasants is closely linked to their ignorance as this makes them vulnerable to scams and abuse, especially due to their reliance on others for contact with the new and complicated world of the city. The Fascist regime legalized the abuse of power, adopted measures that worsened the lives of peasants such as the reduction of wages and laws of emigration. This was not just a problem in Italy, as Silone states in his preface, The poor peasants, the men who make the earth fruitful and suffer hunger, …are alike in all the countries of the world ( p. 18) Their ignorance meant that they could not progress up the social ladder, and At Fontamara there are only two rungs on the social ladder: the lowest, that of the cafoni, which is at ground level, and that of the small landowners, which is just a little higher. They are swindled out of their profits and wages by don Circonstanza and the Impresario, and as every family in Fontamara is connected, every family, even the poorest, has interests that are shared with others, and for lack of wealth it is poverty that has to be shared. So at Fontamara there's not a family that doesn't have a lawsuit pending. Their ignorance makes them vulnerable to exploitation. They are disconnected with the world and don't know about new laws like the Emigration Policy, wage rate changes, and identity cards and papers needed to get on a train or work elsewhere. The Italian Unification is still a recent event to them, they are ignorant of the new Fascist regime and still think that Queen Margherita is alive. Berardo also asks the Solito Sconsciuto if Russia exists. "Russia? Tell me the truth, is there really such a place as this Russia there's so much talk about? Everyone talks about it, but no one has ever been there. Cafoni go everywhere, to America, Africa, France, but no one has ever been to Russia."

=== Southern question ===
In the foreword Silone points out the remarkable difference between how the South of Italy has been portrayed and the reality with which the poor peasants of the South are actually faced. 'To the foreign reader...this tale will be in striking contrast to the picturesque vision of southern Italy often conjured up in tourist literature. In some books, of course, southern Italy is a blessed and beautiful land in which the peasants go caroling joyfully to work, echoed prettily by a chorus of country girls dressed in traditional costume, while nightingales trill in the neighbouring wood'. Silone portrays a much more realistic version of the South and critically analyzes Italian history through their point of view. As Nelson Moe indicates, there is a vast difference between the situations the North and South of Italy and '’The vexed relationship between the two parts of Italy, often referred to as the Southern Question, has shaped that nation's political, social, and cultural life throughout the 20th century’ The annexation of the House of Savoy was like a colonial conquest for the South, the large estates remaining intact, along with the social connections that meant the rich could become richer. The post-unification governments could not help the hunger of the peasants. In fact, the older villagers in Fontamara say that the only things the Piemontesi (people from Piedmont) brought with the Italian Unification, was electric lighting and cigarettes. Not even partial expropriation of properties was practiced, nor was the land that had been confiscated from religious orders, assigned to peasants. Instead that land was put up for auction, a system that only favoured those who had large amounts of liquid capital, therefore perpetuating the inequality of wealth between the north and south.

=== The Fucino ===
The Fucino is an extremely fertile area of land of 35 acres and is owned by the so-called princely family of Torlonia. The cafoni work the land and feel that if they owned it, the crops they would harvest would allow them to start earning some money instead of borrowing money to buy seeds and food through the winter, and eating or selling all they harvest to pay for lawsuits. The Fucino basin was subject to a colonial regime. The great wealth it yields annually enriches a privileged minority of local people while the rest migrate to the capital. Don Circonsanza's motto is Fucino a chi lo cultiva (Fucino to he who cultivates it) and when they are invited to Avezzano they think they will get a chance to discuss the matter with the authorities, but the Fontamaresi discover that Cav. Pelino was their representative and the authorities have twisted these words into a justification for giving the land to the rich. Fucino will go to he who can cultivate it, he who has the means to cultivate it. In other words Fucino goes to he who has sufficient capital. Fucino must be freed from the impoverished small tenant farmers and given to the rich farmers.

=== Religion and destiny ===
The Fontamaresi often are quite passive in their reactions, attributing events to God's will or destiny. For instance, Maria Rosa, Berardo's mother, says Berardo's not a bad man, but he was born under an unlucky star, poor fellow. What a hard destiny is his. Religious references are used to foreshadow what will come, for example Donna Clorinda prays to Saint Antonio and believes her prayers are answered when she sees Baldissera in Sulmona. Nazzarena, Elvira's mother, had a dream when Elvira was born that the Virgin Mary said to her I give you the most beautiful of my doves but you and your husband will pay for it with great suffering. Nazzarena herself dies and her husband is very ill. Elvira goes on a pilgrimage to the Madonna to take her life and to help Berardo in return and her prayers are granted and she dies in bed from a high fever.
There are also signs of the cross in the book, for example an insect appears when Cav. Pelino is persuading them to sign the petition. Marietta claims I think it's a new kind. Darker, longer and with a cross on its back. Zompa explains that God decided that a new kind of louse should appear after every big revolution and then goes on to explain a dream he had. Priest don Abbachio had forbidden him to tell anyone. In the dream Jesus is talking to the Pope and requesting the Fucino be given to the cafoni, that the cafoni be exempt from taxes and that they enjoy an abundant harvest whilst the Pope takes the view of the authorities that Prince Torlonia, nor the government would agree and that an abundant harvest would cause food prices to fall. The Pope releases a cloud of lice on the houses of the poor so that in moments of idleness you have something to distract your thoughts from sin Moreover, when Berardo is being tortured, and fighting back they dragged him back to the cell by his legs and shoulders like Christ when He was taken down from the cross. Berardo, in sacrificing himself for others, could be interpreted as a Christ-like figure. It is interesting that the story of San Giuseppe da Copertino, told by don Abbachio, a story they had heard many times before, shows they think Jesus has a different attitude to rich and poor. In the church there is a picture of the Eucharist with Jesus holding a piece of white bread.Jesus was not talking of the dark bread that the cafoni eat, or the tasteless substitute for bread that is the consecrated wafer of the priests. Jesus had in His hand a piece of real white bread and was saying "This (white) bread is My body"

=== Fascism ===
Silone denounces the immorality of the Fascists, using simple terms. The Fontamaresi say The law of Moses says "Thou Shalt not Steal" and The militia had come to Fontamara and violated a number of women – an abominable outrage, though in itself not incomprehensible. But they had done it in the name of the law and in the presence of an inspector of police, and that was incomprehensible...On a number of occasions, we were told, so-called Fascists had beaten up, injured and sometimes killed persons who had done nothing wrong in the eyes of the law, merely because they were a nuisance to the Impresario, and that too might be natural enough. But those who did the injuring and killing were rewarded by the authorities and that was inexplicable. The Fontamaresi don't know about the new Fascist regime and mistake the blackshirts for their dead. Baldissera sees a procession of men in black shirts marching in formation behind little black flags, and both the flags and the men's chests were decorated with skulls and crossbones.. We see that the Fontamaresi do not understand who they are when Marietta asks "Were they our dead? thinking of her dead and the five-lire fee". When the Fontamaresi go to Avezzano, they are told to bring a pennant. They don't understand that they are supposed to bring the Fascist pennant, and do not even have one, and take the flag of San Rocco instead, and are therefore mocked both on the way to Avezzano and in the square. The flags that everyone else had were black and no bigger than a pocket handkerchief and in the middle there was a picture of a skull and crossbones. Baldissera ask if they are the living dead, the souls bought by Don Circonstanza? They are asked to sing the anthem when they pass through villages on the truck, but ask, What anthem? Many of the black shirts that arrive to rape the women of Fontamara are also cafoni. Most of them stank of wine, and yet, if we looked at them straight in the eye, they looked away. They, too, were poor men, but poor men of a special kind:landless, jobless or with many jobs, which is the same thing, and averse to hard work. Too weak and cowardly to rebel against the rich and the authorities, they preferred serving them in order to be able to rob and oppress other poor men, cafoni, small landowners. When you met them in the street in daylight, they were humble and obsequious, but at night and in groups they were evil, malicious, treacherous...recruiting them in a special army, giving them a special uniform and special arms, was a novelty. Such as the so-called Fascists. The Fascists put measures in place to make life as hard as possible for the peasants. They introduce the emigration law, and cut wages and they force workers to have Identity cards and papers to work as a day labourer elsewhere.

=== Exploitation ===
The Fontamaresi, are more often than not, exploited. They are tricked into signing the petition, agreeing to the three-quarter, three-quarter split, the 10 lustri swindle, the Impresario buying the wheat at 120 per hundredweight so that he could then sell it at 170 per hundredweight, and Berardo and Giuva's son are exploited by Don Achille Pazienza in Rome. Cav. Pelino lies to them, saying "There are new authorities in office now, who hold the peasants in high esteem and wish to give consideration to their views. So i appeal to you to give me your signatures. Show your appreciation of the honor that the authorities have done you in sending an official here to discover your wishes At the beginning of the story The famous story of the donkey and the priest was the most disgraceful hoax of all of the many that have been played on the Fontamaresi. They thought that a new priest would be coming to Fontamara and cleaned the church, mended the road, put up an arch and decorated the village in his honour. However it turns out that instead of a priest, they were given a donkey adorned with coloured paper to represent sacred vestments. Therefore our first thought was that the diversion of the stream was a practical joke too Berardo says Every government always consists of thieves. But if a government consists of a single thief instead of five hundred it's better for the cafoni, of course, because the appetite of a big thief, however big it may be, will always be less than that of five hundred small and hungry thieves.

=== Townsmen and cafoni ===
There is a great divide between the cafoni and the townsmen. When Cav. Pelino comes, Giuva says It's hard for a townsman and a cafone to understand each other. When he talked, he was a townsman; he couldn't help being a townsman, he couldn't help being a townsman, he couldn't talk in any other way. But we were cafoni...I talked to cafoni of all nationalities from Spaniards to Indians, and we understood each other as if we were at Fontamara. But there was an Italian townsman who came to see us on Sundays...we couldn't make head or tail of what ...[he] said. The townsmen also mock the cafoni and treat them very badly, saying you're cafoni, you're used to suffering, and Innocenzo la Legge says, There's no doubt that legal proceedings would be highly effective if it were possible to seize and sell lice. The cafoni also dislike the townsmen and Marietta says "Educated people are pedantic and get very angry about words. Berardo says "Don't argue with the authorities. The law is made by townsmen. It is applied by judges, who are all townsmen, and it is interpreted by lawyers, who are all townsmen. How can a peasant expect justice?. Later when he is talking in prison with the Solito Sconosciuto, Berardo is shocked at the Solito Sconosciuto's proposal and starts shouting "What? Townsmen and cafoni unite? But townsmen are well off and cafoni are badly off. Townsmen work less and earn more, they eat, drink and don't pay taxes. It's enough to see how much they make us pay for cloth and hats and boot leather. We're like worms. Everyone exploits us. Everyone tramples on us. Everyone swindles us. Even Don Circonstanza, the Friend of the People, swindles us."

== Reception ==
Fontamara was 'one of the most widely reviewed, read and talked about novels of the 1930s in North and South America, Europe and the Soviet Union' and 'was interpreted by foreign readers in the 1930s as a factual revelation of Fascist oppression and peasant resistance’. It served to discredit Mussolini's Fascist regime, however it also led some readers to the mistaken conclusion that the Fascists were actually resorting to mass-rape and mass-murder of those who opposed the regime.

In 1934, the first English translation received wide acclaim; Clifton Fadiman in The New Yorker called the novel "a little epic of peasant resistance, based upon an actual event in recent Italian history", while Graham Greene in The Spectator praised it as "the most moving account of Fascist barbarity [he had] yet read"; New York Times Book Review wrote: "The propaganda, if it is such, is in the facts. The presentation is objective, impersonal, restrained."

Leon Trotsky wrote in 1934: "This is a remarkable book. [...] Fontamara is a book of impassioned political propaganda. But in it revolutionary passion attains such heights as to result in a genuinely artistic creation... In the course of some 200 pages of the book this name becomes the symbol of agricultural Italy, of all its villages and their poverty and their despair and their rebellion....This book deserves a circulation of many million copies. But whatever may be the attitude of the official bureaucracy towards those works which belong to the genuine revolutionary literature, Fontamara – we are certain – will find its way to the masses. It is the duty of every revolutionist to assist in circulating this book."

George Orwell called Silone "one of the most interesting of the writers who have come up in the last five years" in 1939: "his Fontamara is one of the brightest spots of the Penguin Library"; later he compared the novel to Arthur Koestler's Darkness at Noon and wrote that both of these two belong to "the special class of literature that has arisen out of the European political struggle since the rise of Fascism", and that these were unlikely to appear in English literature, as "there is almost no English writer to whom it has happened to see totalitarianism from the inside", as unlikely "as for a slave-trade to write Uncle Tom's Cabin."

In his Politics and the Novel (1957), Irving Howe described Fontamara as "the one important work of modern fiction that fully absorbs the Marxist outlook on the level of myth or legend; one of the few works of modern fiction in which Marxist categories seem organic and 'natural,' not in the sense that they are a part of the peasant heritage or arise spontaneously in the peasant imagination, but in the sense that the whole weight of the peasant experience, at least as it takes form in this book, requires an acceptance of these categories." Later critics diverged from that view; Elizabeth Leake believes the novel to be "marked with deep-seated ideological ambivalence", arguing that it "introduces, then subverts, some of Marxism's fundamental concepts, by investing them with autobiographical elements that deform and deflate them."

New York Times, 2009: "Silone would become a celebrated realist novelist: Italy's greatest living writer, in Faulkner's opinion, as famous in his time as George Orwell or Arthur Koestler... Silone himself made few literary claims for the trilogy, and no doubt they aren't "great novels" in the sense that Anna Karenina and Ulysses are. But then neither are Darkness at Noon or Nineteen Eighty-Four, let alone Uncle Tom's Cabin: political or didactic fiction is not to be judged by the standards of Flaubert. The fact is that Fontamara and its successors inspired a generation, and Silone's admirers included Bertrand Russell, Graham Greene, Thomas Mann and Arturo Toscanini."

== Adaptations ==
- Fontamara (film), 1980 film, directed by Carlo Lizzani.
- "Bitter Stream", March - may 1936 play by Victor Wolfson. Presented in New York at the Civic Repertory Theatre.
