= Drive In (TV program) =

Italian television variety show aired from 1983 to 1989

- Genre: Variety; Sketch Comedy
- Presented by: Gianfranco D'Angelo; Ezio Greggio; Enrico Beruschi
- Country of origin: Italy
- No. of seasons: 6

Original release
- Network: Italia 1
- Release: October 4, 1983 – April 17, 1988

Drive In is an Italian television sketch comedy variety show, created by Antonio Ricci. The show's six seasons were broadcast by Italia 1 from 1983 to 1989. It was referred to as the most innovative and popular Italian television show of the 1980s.

== History ==
The show revolutionized Italian TV conventions and languages, presenting a zany, sharp and fast-paced type of humor, partly imported from the model of the Saturday Night Live. It also proposed a new, different image of the women, more sensual and transgressive. Due to its high audience ratings, it has a key role in the success of Silvio Berlusconi's Fininvest (now Mediaset).

The show launched the careers of several comedians (such as Ezio Greggio, Giorgio Faletti, Francesco Salvi) as well as of a number of showgirls (including Tinì Cansino and Lory Del Santo). It generated a series of imitation programs, several of them also created by the same Antonio Ricci.
