= Memè Perlini =

Italian actor

- Born: Amelio Perlini; 8 December 1947; Sant'Angelo in Lizzola, Italy
- Died: 5 April 2017 (aged 69); Rome, Italy
- Occupations: Actor, film director
- Years active: 1971-2005

Amelio "Memè" Perlini (8 December 1947 – 5 April 2017) was an Italian actor and film director. His directorial debut, Italian Postcards, was screened in the Un Certain Regard section at the 1987 Cannes Film Festival.

He directed Teatro La Maschera, of Rome, in his theatrical adaptation of Raymond Roussel's Locus Solus at La MaMa Experimental Theatre Club in New York City in April 1977. The production was co-presented by La MaMa and the International Theatre Institute, and billed as the First International Theater Festival.

Perlini died in Rome on 5 April 2017, at the age of 69. He seems to have committed suicide by jumping from the fifth floor of his house.

== Filmography ==
Year	Title	Role	Notes
1970	A Pocketful of Chestnuts		
1971	Duck, You Sucker!	Miranda's Son	
1972	Sexy Sinners	Guido / Friend of Rainero	
1972	Canterbury proibito	Fox	(segment "Gallo Cantachiaro")
1972	The Grand Duel	Saxon Henchman	
1978	Quando c'era lui... caro lei!	Adolf Hitler	
1980	Eugenio	'Baffo'	
1982	Cercasi Gesù	Don Gerado	
1986	La ragazza dei lillà	Vasco	
1987	Italian Postcards		Director and screenwriter
1987	The Family	Aristide	
1987	Italian Night	Francesco 'Checco' Righi	
1990	Panama Sugar	Lt. Garcia	
1990	Atto di dolore	Ramella	
1990	Ferdinando, uomo d'amore	Don Catellino	
1992	Zuppa di pesce	Edoardo	
1992	Il piacere delle carni	Morano the Butcher	
1994	An American Love	Petri	TV movie
1996	Come mi vuoi	Don Michele	
1998	Onorevoli detenuti		
2003	Tosca e altre due		
