= Tinì Cansino =

Greek actress and television personality

- Born: Photina Lappa; 23 September 1959 (age 65); Volos, Greece
- Occupation(s): Actress, television personality

Tinì Cansino, stage name of Photina Lappa (born 23 September 1959), is a Greek actress and television personality, mainly active in Italy.

== Biography ==
Born in Volos, she studied ballet, and made her television debut in the show Playgirl, hosted by Minnie Minoprio. Her stage name was chosen by the agent Alberto Tarallo, in relation to her remembrance to Rita Hayworth (whose real surname was Cansino). She is best known for the TV-show Drive In, in which she starred between 1983 and 1988. During these years she was also active in cinema, especially in comedies and erotic films. She made her television comeback in 2012 as a pundit in the Canale 5 dating show Uomini e donne.
