= Salvatore Piscicelli =

Italian director, screenwriter and film critic (1948–2024)

- Born: 4 January 1948; Pomigliano d'Arco, Campania, Italy
- Died: 21 July 2024 (aged 76); Rome, Lazio, Italy
- Resting place: Campo Verano, Rome
- Occupation(s): Film director and screenwriter

Salvatore Piscicelli (4 January 1948 – 21 July 2024) was an Italian director, screenwriter and film critic.

== Life and career ==
Born in Pomigliano d'Arco, after activity as a film critic, Piscicelli started his film career with some documentary short films shot and set in his hometown. His feature debut film, Immacolata and Concetta: The Other Jealousy, won several awards including the Silver Leopard at the Locarno International Film Festival. His 1981 film Le occasioni di Rosa entered the 38th Venice International Film Festival. In 2001, using only digital supports, he shot Quartetto, the first Italian film to follow the dictates of the avant-garde filmmaking movement "Dogma". Piscicelli died in Rome on 21 July 2024, at the age of 76.

== Filmography ==
- Immacolata and Concetta: The Other Jealousy (1979)
- The Opportunities of Rosa (1981)
- Blues metropolitano (1985)
- Regina (1987)
- Baby Gang (1992)
- Il corpo dell'anima (1999)
- Quartetto (2001)
- At the End of the Night (2003)
- Vita segreta di Maria Capasso (2019)
