= Cinepanettone =

Series of Italian Christmas comedy films

The cinepanettoni (sg.: cinepanettone) are a series of farcical comedy films, one or two of which are typically released annually in Italy during the Christmas period. The films were originally produced by Aurelio De Laurentiis' Filmauro studio.

== Etymology ==
Starting in 1983, a number of farcical or comic movies were released every year around Christmas time in Italy, and were known as cinepanettoni, a portmanteau of Italian: cine for "cinema", and panettone is a type of sweet bread traditionally eaten at Christmas.

== The saga of cinepanettoni ==
These films are usually focused on the holidays of stereotypical Italians: bungling, affluent and presumptuous members of the middle class who visit famous, glamorous or exotic places. Films were set, for example, in the Netherlands (Merry Christmas, 2001), Egypt (Christmas in Egypt – Natale sul Nilo, 2002), India (Christmas in India – Natale in India, 2003), America (Christmas in Miami, 2005, or Christmas in New York, 2006), and Cortina d'Ampezzo (Christmas holidays in Cortina – Vacanze di Natale a Cortina, 2011). Directors included Carlo Vanzina, Enrico Oldoini, and Neri Parenti. Many of the screenplays are not related to the Christmas season, other than those set in Italy.

The protagonists (almost always Massimo Boldi and Christian De Sica) joined by other comic couples (Sabrina Ferilli, Ricky Memphis, Biagio Izzo, Alberto Sordi, Claudio Bisio, Alessandro Gassmann, Michelle Hunziker, Ezio Greggio) and international guests (Danny DeVito, Luke Perry, Ronn Moss) find themselves struggling with their holidays and the various messes that combine abroad. The children of these characters will often be the only ones able to solve the complicated situations created by their own fathers, who do nothing but get entangled in intrigues with the underworld or love affairs.

== Reception ==
Italian critics have often considered such films of little ethical or educational value, because they contain large amounts of vulgar language, and characters being bad examples to younger viewers. In many storylines characters played by De Sica and Boldi, mature and elderly people, loom too large on the scene, preventing younger actors from making a mark in the films. Other critics have noted that this line of films, including the authors, actors and directors, are a reflection of the era and the power of Silvio Berlusconi, and the ideals of his supporters.

Despite their poor critical reception, by 2002 the films had grossed 700 billion lire ($350 million).

== Filmography of cinepanettoni ==
- Vacanze di Natale ("Christmas Holidays"), directed by Carlo Vanzina (1983), Italy
- Vacanze di Natale '90 ("Christmas holidays of 1990"), directed by Enrico Oldoini (1990), Switzerland
- Vacanze di Natale '91 ("Christmas holidays of 1991"), directed by Enrico Oldoini (1991), Switzerland
- Vacanze di Natale '95 ("Christmas holidays of 1995"), directed by Neri Parenti (1995), United States
- Vacanze di Natale 2000 ("Christmas holidays of 2000"), directed by Carlo Vanzina (1999 – celebrating the 3rd millennium), Italy
- Merry Christmas, directed by Neri Parenti (2001), Netherlands
- Natale sul Nilo ("Christmas on the Nile"), directed by Neri Parenti (2002), Egypt
- Natale in India ("Christmas in India"), directed by Neri Parenti (2003), India
- Christmas in Love, directed by Neri Parenti (2004), Switzerland
- Natale a Miami ("Christmas in Miami"), directed by Neri Parenti (2005), United States
- Natale a New York ("Christmas in New York"), directed by Neri Parenti (2006), United States
- Natale in crociera ("Christmas on cruise"), directed by Neri Parenti (2007), Dominican Republic
- Natale a Rio ("Christmas in Rio"), directed by Neri Parenti (2008), Brazil
- Natale a Beverly Hills ("Christmas in Beverly Hills"), directed by Neri Parenti (2009), United States
- Natale in Sudafrica ("Christmas in South Africa"), directed by Neri Parenti (2010), South Africa
- Vacanze di Natale a Cortina ("Christmas holidays in Cortina"), directed by Neri Parenti (2011), Italy
- Vacanze ai Caraibi ("Holidays in the Caribbean"), directed by Neri Parenti (2014), Dominican Republic
- In vacanza su Marte ("Holidays on Mars"), directed by Neri Parenti (2020), Mars

== Bibliography ==
- O'Leary, Alan (21 November 2013). Fenomenologia del cinepanettone. Rubbettino Editore, 2013. ISBN 978-8849838152.
- O'Leary, Alan (2013). "On the Complexity of Cinepanettone". In Bayman, Louis; Rigoletto, Sergio (eds.). Popular Italian Cinema. Palgrave Macmillan. pp. 200–213. ISBN 978-1-137-30565-7.
