= Body Guards =

2000 Italian comedy film by Neri Parenti

- Directed by: Neri Parenti
- Written by: Fausto Brizzi; Marco Martani; Neri Parenti
- Produced by: Aurelio De Laurentiis
- Starring: Christian De Sica; Massimo Boldi; Cindy Crawford; Megan Gale; Enzo Salvi; Biagio Izzo; Anna Falchi; Victoria Silvstedt
- Cinematography: Giuseppe Ruzzolini
- Edited by: Luca Montanari
- Music by: Bruno Zambrini
- Release date: 2000
- Running time: 100 minutes
- Country: Italy
- Language: Italian

Body Guards (Italian: Body Guards – Guardie del corpo) is a 2000 Italian comedy film directed by Neri Parenti.

== Plot ==
Fabio Leone and Paolo Pecora are two police officers of Rome who, together with the careless Neapolitan Ciro Marmotta, are fired from the barracks to have scuppered the plan to capture a secret agent. Fortunately the three friends manage to enlist in a guardhouse more specialized, which involves the VIPs protection in Italy and foreign countries, on a visit to Rome. But the three friends, who now also joined Romolo: the scullion of the bodyguards' association, always combine a lot of troubles.

== Cast ==
- Christian De Sica: Fabio Leone
- Massimo Boldi: Paolo Pecora
- Biagio Izzo: Ciro Marmotta
- Enzo Salvi: Romolo "Er Cobra"
- Sebastiano Lo Monaco: Codispoti
- Megan Gale: herself
- Victoria Silvstedt: herself
- Luca Laurenti: himself
- Emanuele De Nicolò: Savino Incoronato
- Donata Frisini: Teresa Incoronato
- Paolo Conticini: maniac
- Anna Falchi: herself
- Cindy Crawford: herself / her double
- Isa Gallinelli: women sadomaso
- Peter Boom: Ambassador
- Alessandra Casella: Beauty Farm Director
- Nicoletta Boris: Beauty Farm doctor
- Riccardo Parisio Perrotti: Carabiniere
- Cristina Parodi: herself
- Gigi Marzullo: himself
- Bruce McGuire: Manager Cindy Crawford
- Demo Morselli: himself
