= Le comiche =

- Directed by: Neri Parenti
- Written by: Alessandro Bencivenni; Leonardo Benvenuti; Piero De Bernardi; Neri Parenti; Domenico Saverni
- Produced by: Mario Cecchi Gori; Vittorio Cecchi Gori
- Starring: Renato Pozzetto; Paolo Villaggio
- Cinematography: Sandro Tamborra; Roberto Gerardi
- Music by: Bruno Zambrini
- Release date: October 28, 1990
- Language: Italian

Le comiche is a 1990 Italian comedy film written and directed by Neri Parenti and starring Renato Pozzetto and Paolo Villaggio. It had two sequels, Le comiche 2 (1991) and Le nuove comiche (1994).

== Plot ==
Neri Parenti creates some comic episodes, inserting various gags taken from films of the past: Laurel and Hardy, Charlie Chaplin and Buster Keaton. In the silent black and white prologue two railroad workers, Paolo and Renato, are trying to outrun a steam train and jump out of the screen into a movie theatre; in the first episode they are bungling painters who ruin a wedding; in the second the two friends destroy a gas station; in the third episode they are forced to work in the mountain chalet, ruining the holiday for all customers; in the last the two friends are the perfect double of two fierce mafia, who plan to use the "twins" for a suicide mission; in the epilogue Paolo and Renato are chased by characters of all the episodes back into the silent film.

== Cast ==
- Renato Pozzetto as Renato
- Paolo Villaggio as Paolo
- Fabio Traversa as Mario
- Alessandra Casella as Domitilla
- Gian as Amilcare
- Tiziana Pini as Amilcare's wife
- Enzo Cannavale as the priest
- Sal Borgese as the gas station attendant
- Renato D'Amore as the innkeeper
- Giovanni Cianfriglia as the trucker
- Ennio Antonelli as the pizza chef
- Andrea Belfiore as the stripper at the nightclub
- Pierfrancesco Villaggio as the bodyguard
- Franca Scagnetti as a guest at the wedding

== See also ==
- List of Italian films of 1990
- https://it.wikiquote.org/wiki/Le_comiche
