= Cucciolo (film) =

- Directed by: Neri Parenti
- Written by: Neri Parenti; Enrico Vanzina
- Produced by: Aurelio De Laurentiis
- Starring: Massimo Boldi; Claudia Koll
- Cinematography: Carlo Tafani
- Edited by: Sergio Montanari
- Music by: Bruno Zambrini
- Release date: 10 April 1998
- Running time: 99 minutes
- Country: Italy
- Language: Italian

Cucciolo (lit. 'Puppy') is a 1998 Italian comedy film directed by Neri Parenti.

== Cast ==
- Massimo Boldi as Massimo "Mimmo" Colombo
- Claudia Koll as Claudia
- Bruno Gambarotta as Amedeo Colombo, Mimmo's father
- Gisella Sofio as Lucia Colombo, Mimmo's mother
- Maurizio Micheli as Willy
- Mirko Setaro as Antonio, Gaetano's father
- Lunetta Savino as Marisa, Gaetano's mother
- Mario Bianco as Gaetano
- Cristina D'Avena as herself
- Gerry Scotti as himself
- Gabibbo as himself
- Paolo Calissano as Claudia's ex-boyfriend
- Elisabetta Pellini as Vanessa
- Enzo Robutti as the psychologist
- Guido Nicheli as the man in the club
- Neri Parenti as the casting director
