= Natale in India =

- Directed by: Neri Parenti
- Written by: Fausto Brizzi; Lorenzo De Luca; Marco Martani; Neri Parenti
- Produced by: Aurelio De Laurentiis
- Starring: Massimo Boldi; Christian De Sica; Enzo Salvi; Biagio Izzo; Fichi d'India
- Cinematography: Gianlorenzo Battaglia
- Edited by: Luca Montanari
- Music by: Bruno Zambrini
- Release date: December 19, 2003
- Running time: 101 minutes
- Country: Italy
- Language: Italian

Natale in India (lit. 'Christmas in India') is a 2003 Italian Christmas comedy film directed by Neri Parenti.

== Cast ==
- Massimo Boldi as Enrico Paci
- Christian De Sica as Fabio De Tassis
- Enzo Salvi as Vomito ("Puke")
- Biagio Izzo as Gennaro Pedicini
- Bruno Arena as Bruno
- Max Cavallari as Max
- Paolo Conticini as Tony
- Clarissa Burt as Silvia De Tassis
- Giulia Montanarini as Giovanna Bertocchi
- Davide Perino as Nelson De Tassis
- Emanuele Angeloni as Costantino Paci
- Fabio Ferrari as the judge
- Moira Orfei as herself
- Carlo Vanzina as himself
- Pier Francesco Pingitore as himself
- Garrison Rochelle as himself
- DJ Albertino as himself
- Francesco Giorgino as himself

== See also ==
- List of Christmas films
