= Fratelli Benvenuti =

- Country of origin: Italy
- No. of seasons: 1
- No. of episodes: 12

Production
- Running time: 100 min.

Original release
- Network: Canale 5, Rete 4
- Release: March 21 – August 3, 2010

Fratelli Benvenuti is an Italian television series, acted at shopping mall "La Corte Lombarda" in Bellinzago Lombardo.

== Cast ==
- Fathy El Gharbawy - Father Krishna
- Massimo Boldi - Lorenzo
- Barbara De Rossi - Teresa
- Enzo Salvi - Claudio
- Elisabetta Canalis - Krishna
- Massimo Ciavarro - Angelo
- Gea Lionello - Elvira
- Loredana De Nardis - Lara
- Lucrezia Piaggio - Giorgia
- Davide Silvestri - Renato
- I Fichi d'India - Louis and Jean
- Gisella Sofio - The Conuntess
- Paolo Ferrari - Pericle
- Elisabetta Gregoraci - Chiara
- Gloria Guida - Doris
- Nina Torresi - Camilla
- Valerio Morigi - Luca
- Valeria Graci - Maria
- Manuela Boldi - Grazia
- Eleonora Gaggioli - Angela
- David Sebasti - Paolo
- Lorenzo Vavassori - Pippo
- Charlie Gnocchi - Primo
- Alessandro Sampaoli - Raffaello
- Paolo Migone - Michele
- I Turbolenti - Security
- Paola Onofri - Donatella
- Claudia Lawrence -

== See also ==
- List of Italian television series
