= Tifosi (film) =

- Directed by: Neri Parenti
- Written by: Enrico Vanzina; Carlo Vanzina; Neri Parenti; Fausto Brizzi; Marco Martani
- Produced by: Aurelio De Laurentiis
- Starring: Massimo Boldi; Christian De Sica; Diego Abatantuono; Enzo Iacchetti; Maurizio Mattioli; Diego Armando Maradona; Nino D'Angelo
- Cinematography: Gianlorenzo Battaglia
- Edited by: Alberto Gallitti
- Music by: Bruno Zambrini
- Distributed by: Filmauro
- Release date: 1999
- Running time: 120 min
- Country: Italy
- Language: Italian
- Box office: $5.1 million (Italy)

Tifosi (also known as Fans) is a 1999 Italian sports comedy film directed by Neri Parenti.

== Plot ==
The film consists of four segments. The Roman Cesare, a supporter of Lazio, hates to death the Interist Carlo, even if their children fall in love. Silvio, a supporter of Milan, finds himself involved in a match in the company of peasants fans of A.S. Roma. The hooligan "Zebrone", a supporter of Juventus, faces three representatives of a rival football team, who intend to steal the scarf that Zebrone has received as a gift from a footballer. The thief Gennaro meets the legendary Diego Maradona in his villa in Naples during a match between Napoli and Atalanta.

== Cast ==
- Massimo Boldi: Silvio Galliani
- Christian De Sica: Cesare Proietti
- Diego Abatantuono: "Zebrone"
- Enzo Iacchetti: Carlo Colombo
- Maurizio Mattioli: Nando
- Nino D'Angelo: Gennaro Scognamiglio
- Diego Armando Maradona: himself
- Angelo Bernabucci: Fabio
- Peppe Quintale: Ferdinando
- Alessandra Bellini: Marta Proietti
- Giulio Brunetti: Fabrizio Colombo
- Patrizia Loreti: Maria Luigia, detta "Topa Gigia"
- Victor Poletti: Callisto Culatello
- Alessandro Bettocchi: Pierpaolo Culatello
- Giorgio Roma: Poldo Culatello
- Antonio Allocca: Zio Gaetano
- Massimo Ferrante: Zebrino
- Andrea Moretti: Zebrino
- Maurizio Mosca: himself
- Idris: himself
- Massimo Caputi: himself
- Giacomo Bulgarelli: himself
- Ela Weber: herself
- Giampiero Galeazzi: himself
- Fabio Fazio: himself
- Franco Baresi: himself
- Pasquale Bruno: himself
- Erika Bernardi: hostess
- Antonio Spinnato:
- Bruno Gambarotta:
- Franco Neri:
- Peppe Lanzetta:
