= Merry Christmas (2001 film) =

- Directed by: Neri Parenti
- Written by: Fausto Brizzi; Lorenzo De Luca; Marco Martani; Neri Parenti
- Produced by: Aurelio De Laurentiis
- Starring: Massimo Boldi; Christian De Sica; Enzo Salvi; Biagio Izzo; Fichi d'India
- Cinematography: Gianlorenzo Battaglia
- Edited by: Luca Montanari
- Music by: Bruno Zambrini
- Distributed by: Filmauro
- Release date: 21 December 2001
- Running time: 98 minutes
- Country: Italy
- Language: Italian
- Budget: $7.5 million

Merry Christmas is a 2001 Italian Christmas comedy film directed by Neri Parenti.

== Cast ==
- Massimo Boldi as Enrico Carli
- Christian De Sica as Fabio Trivellone
- Enzo Salvi as Cesare Mandrione
- Bruno Arena as Bruno
- Max Cavallari as Max
- Biagio Izzo as the hotel's porter
- Emanuela Folliero as Serena Trivellone
- Paula Vázquez as Selvaggia Trivellone
- Sarah Calogero as Martina Trivellone
- Marco Iannone as Matteo Trivellone
- Lucía Jordán as Michela Carli
- Joe Watson as George
- Rosanna Walls as Jenny
- Eva Marciel as Carla

== Production ==
The film was Filmauro's annual Christmas comedy. It was originally titled Christmas in New York. It was filming at Fiumicino Airport in Rome, Italy on 11 September 2001 and was due to film in New York for four weeks 4 days later. Following the 11 September 2001 attacks, production was stopped for a month and the script rewritten to change the location to Amsterdam.

== Reception ==
The film opened at the top of the Italian box office with a first week gross of 11.7 billion lire ($5.6 million) and remained there for a second week, grossing $13.5 million in 12 days. It was the first Filmauro comedy to be the Christmas number one since A spasso nel tempo in 1996.

== See also ==
- List of Christmas films
