= Scuola di ladri - Parte seconda =

- Theatrical release poster by Renato Casaro
- Directed by: Neri Parenti
- Written by: Franco Castellano; Giuseppe Moccia; Franco Marotta; Laura Toscano; Neri Parenti
- Starring: Paolo Villaggio; Massimo Boldi; Enrico Maria Salerno; Florence Guérin
- Cinematography: Alessandro D'Eva
- Edited by: Sergio Montanari
- Music by: Bruno Zambrini
- Release date: 22 September 1987 (Italy)
- Running time: 96 min.
- Language: Italian

Scuola di ladri - Parte seconda is a 1987 Italian comedy film directed by Neri Parenti starring Enrico Maria Salerno, who reprised his role of thief Aliprando, with Paolo Villaggio and Massimo Boldi. It is the sequel to the 1986 film Scuola di ladri.

== Plot summary ==
Milan, Italy mid-1980s. In this second episode Dalmazio and Egisto come, respectively, from the prison and the insane asylum. They risk a second arrest for their awkwardness so they return from their "uncle" who is willing to help them.

== Cast ==
- Enrico Maria Salerno as Aliprando Siraghi
- Paolo Villaggio as Dalmazio Siraghi
- Massimo Boldi as Egisto Siraghi
- Florence Guérin as Susanna Volpi
- John Richardson as the ship's captain
- Daniel Lambert as the rich jeweler
- Romano Puppo as boatswain
- Stefano Antonucci as a traveler by train
- Claudio Boldi as an armored

== Release ==
The film was released in Italy on September 22, 1987
