= Scuola di ladri =

- Theatrical release poster
- Directed by: Neri Parenti
- Written by: Franco Castellano; Giuseppe Moccia; Neri Parenti
- Starring: Enrico Maria Salerno; Paolo Villaggio; Lino Banfi; Massimo Boldi
- Cinematography: Sandro D'Eva
- Edited by: Sergio Montanari
- Music by: Bruno Zambrini
- Release date: 26 September 1986 (Italy)
- Running time: 96 min.
- Language: Italian

Scuola di ladri (transl. School of thieves) is a 1986 Italian comedy film directed by Neri Parenti starring Enrico Maria Salerno.

== Plot summary ==
Rome, Italy mid-1980s. Three cousins, who do not know each other and who live poor, are gathered from paralytic uncle Aliprando who leads them to a "big job". After they have completed the mission, he robs them.

== Cast ==
- Enrico Maria Salerno as Aliprando Siraghi
- Paolo Villaggio as Dalmazio Siraghi
- Lino Banfi as Amalio Siraghi
- Massimo Boldi as Egisto Siraghi
- Barbara Scoppa as Marisa Padovan
- Ennio Antonelli as Fake priest
- Antonio Barrios as Franco Nero
- Claudio Boldi as The guard
- Corrado Monteforte as Minotti
- Antonio Allocca as Wealthy farmer of Caserta
- Willy Moser as Embassy Luxembourg usher

== Release ==
The film was released in Italy on September 26, 1986 in Padua, Turin, and Genoa. It was one of the most popular Italian films of the year with over 2 million admissions.

== Sequel ==
- Scuola di ladri - Parte seconda (1987)
