= Vacanze di Natale '90 =

- Directed by: Enrico Oldoini
- Written by: Franco Ferrini; Enrico Oldoini
- Produced by: Aurelio De Laurentiis
- Starring: Massimo Boldi; Christian De Sica; Andrea Roncato; Ezio Greggio; Diego Abatantuono
- Cinematography: Sergio Salvati
- Edited by: Raimondo Crociani
- Music by: Giovanni Dell'Orso
- Production company: Filmauro
- Distributed by: Filmauro
- Release date: 1990
- Running time: 101 minutes
- Country: Italy
- Language: Italian

Vacanze di Natale '90 (aka Christmas Vacation '90) is a 1990 Italian Christmas comedy film directed by Enrico Oldoini.

== Plot ==
In residence in the mountains of St Moritz, intertwine the stories of five characters. Nick, a poor waiter, wins a bet on a horse race, but he loses his voice. So he goes on vacation meets a rich lady. Bindo and Toni, old friends, meet them after an argument, and one falls for the wife of the other. Arturo and Beppe, also friends, participating in races with runners, stay in a chalet near the residence of St Moritz. Arturo also falls in love with a woman, but she is the wife of his best friend...

== Cast ==
- Massimo Boldi as Bindo
- Christian De Sica as Toni
- Andrea Roncato as Beppe
- Ezio Greggio as Arturo Zampini
- Diego Abatantuono as Nick
- Corinne Cléry as Alessandra
- Moira Orfei as Gloria (voiced by Isa Di Marzio)
- Giannina Facio as Rita
- Maria Grazia Cucinotta as Arabella (voiced by Simona Izzo)
- Giovanna Pini as Gianna
- Colette Poupon as Eliette
- Galeazzo Benti as Prince Galiberti
- Antonio Cantafora as Pippo
- Ugo Conti as Alvaro
- Saverio Vallone as Lupo Carletti (voiced by Roberto Pedicini)
- Isaac George as Tumbo
- Paolo Paoloni as Eliette's Father
- Diego Abatantuono as bald man (voice)

== See also ==
- List of Christmas films
