= Franca Scagnetti =

Italian actress (1924–1999)

- Born: 17 May 1924; Rome, Italy
- Died: 1 November 1999 (aged 75); Rome, Italy
- Occupation: Actress
- Years active: 1969-1999

Franca Scagnetti (17 May 1924 – 1 November 1999) was an Italian film actress. She appeared in over 80 films between 1969 and 1999. She was born and died in Rome, Italy.

== Selected filmography ==
- Ehi amigo, sei morto! (1970) - Nathaniel's Wife (uncredited)
- Trastevere (1971) - Andrea's wife
- I due assi del guantone (1971) - Mother of a Boxer (uncredited)
- In the Name of the Italian People (1971) - Porter
- We Are All in Temporary Liberty (1971) - Woman Looking for Judge Stammati (uncredited)
- Without Family (1972) - Woman in Hospital (uncredited)
- Il sindacalista (1972) - Worker (uncredited)
- Le notti peccaminose di Pietro l'Aretino (1972) - Villager (uncredited)
- Crime Boss (1972) - Don Faiena's Maid (uncredited)
- The Assassin of Rome (1972) - (uncredited)
- Alfredo, Alfredo (1972) - Maid (uncredited)
- The Scientific Cardplayer (1972) - Pasqualina
- Meo Patacca (1972) - Paesana (uncredited)
- I pugni di Rocco (1972) - Concetta - Maid in Pataneos house
- Bella, ricca, lieve difetto fisico, cerca anima gemella (1973) - Nun
- Dirty Weekend (1973) - Restaurant Customer (uncredited)
- The Black Hand (1973) - Woman finding Body (uncredited)
- Even Angels Eat Beans (1973) - Woman in the Burning Room (uncredited)
- Giovannona Long-Thigh (1973) - Cameriera
- Hospitals: The White Mafia (1973) - Mother of a patient (uncredited)
- The Last Italian Tango (1973) - Partecipante alla gara di tango
- Once Upon a Time in the Wild, Wild West (1973) - Ma (uncredited)
- Polvere di stelle (1973)
- How Funny Can Sex Be? (1973) - Grazia's Mother / ('Viaggio di nozze')
- Abbasso tutti, viva noi (1974) - Rosa
- The Devil Is a Woman (1974) - Supermarket Customer (uncredited)
- Giuda uccide il venerdì (1974) - Portinaia (uncredited)
- Fischia il sesso (1974) - Gavino's relative
- The Sinful Nuns of Saint Valentine (1974) - Nun (uncredited)
- Claretta and Ben (1974) - Innkeeper
- The Gamecock (1974) - The Peasant-Woman (uncredited)
- A pugni nudi (1974) - Prostitute (uncredited)
- Piedino il questurino (1974) - Donna in lutto con vassoio
- Don't Hurt Me, My Love (1974) - Porter in Trastevere (uncredited)
- The Beast (1974) - Receptionist
- Scent of a Woman (1974) - Nun-nurse (uncredited)
- The Balloon Vendor (1974) - Theatre Attendant (uncredited)
- Bello come un arcangelo (1974) - Nun
- La badessa di Castro (1974) - The Backstreet Abortionist (uncredited)
- Seven Devils on Horseback (1975) - Villager
- Mark of Zorro (1975) - Cook (uncredited)
- Convoy Buddies (1975) - Farmer (uncredited)
- Down the Ancient Staircase (1975) - (uncredited)
- The Suspicious Death of a Minor (1975) - Giannino's Mother (uncredited)
- Violent City (1975) - Woman on bus
- Due cuori, una cappella (1975) - Sua madre
- Son tornate a fiorire le rose (1975) - Woman in Isola Tiberina (uncredited)
- Go Gorilla Go (1975) - Woman (uncredited)
- Eye of the Cat (1975) - Slaughterhouse Worker (uncredited)
- Confessions of a Lady Cop (1976) - Borgatara (uncredited)
- L'adolescente (1976) - Carmeluzza
- San Pasquale Baylonne protettore delle donne (1976) - Mother of Indemoniata (uncredited)
- A Common Sense of Modesty (1976) - Cameriera trattoria / Restaurant waitress
- La linea del fiume (1976) - Amalia - madre di Amadeo
- Crimebusters (1976) - Donna che pesta gli scippatori
- Roma, l'altra faccia della violenza (1976) - Woman in the angry crowd (uncredited)
- Bruciati da cocente passione (9176) - La chiromante (uncredited)
- Tutto suo padre (1976) - Friend of Adalgisa (uncredited)
- La prima notte di nozze (1976)
- Febbre da cavallo (1976) - Passeggera del treno (uncredited)
- Sorbole... che romagnola (1976) - Rosalia's mother
- San sha ben tan xiao fu xing (1976) - Woman Hitting Paul (uncredited)
- The Lady Medic (1976) - Passante (uncredited)
- Donna... cosa si fa per te (1976) - Cook (uncredited)
- Cuginetta, amore mio! (1976) - Priest's Housekeeper
- Suspiria (1977) - Cook
- Taxi Girl (1977) - Donna araba (uncredited)
- Per amore di Poppea (1977) - (uncredited)
- Il mostro (1977) - Portinaia (uncredited)
- Beach House (1977) - La donna grassa
- Pane, burro e marmellata (1977) - Caterina Ciccetti - Servant
- Mala, amore e morte (1977) - La donna delle pulizie-The cleaning lady
- Return of the 38 Gang (1977) - Woman (uncredited)
- Being Twenty (1978) - Pedlar (uncredited)
- Tanto va la gatta al lardo... (1978) - Mother of Maria (uncredited)
- Porca società (1978) - La madre
- Lobster for Breakfast (1979) - Trocchia Neighbour
- Neapolitan Mystery (1979) - Asylum patient (uncredited)
- Gardenia (1979) - Woman at Airport (uncredited)
- Scusi lei è normale? (1979) - Porter (uncredited)
- Tutti a squola (1979) - Donna con le borse della spesa (uncredited)
- L'imbranato (1979) - La portinaia
- Il corpo della ragassa (1979) - Maid in Brothel (uncredited)
- Arrivano i gatti (1980)
- Café Express (1980) - Donna nella toilette
- Sugar, Honey and Pepper (1980) - Mamma di Rosalia
- Una vacanza bestiale (1981) - Hostess
- Una vacanza del cactus (1981)
- Pierino contro tutti (1981) - Cassiera del Bar (uncredited)
- I figli... so' pezzi 'e core (1981) - Teresa (uncredited)
- Pierino medico della SAUB (1981) - Paziente imbrattata d'inchiostro (uncredited)
- Teste di quoio (1981) - Madre del portiere (uncredited)
- Pierino il fichissimo (1981) - Assunta, la bidella (uncredited)
- Pierino la peste alla riscossa (1982) - Inquilina
- Eccezzziunale... veramente (1982) - Moglie del Cav. La Monica
- Sesso e volentieri (1982) - Linda Neighbour (uncredited)
- Monsenhor (1982) - Don Appolini's Maid (uncredited)
- All My Friends Part 2 (1982) - Cook (uncredited)
- Vai avanti tu che mi vien da ridere (1982) - Una cuoca al ricevimento (uncredited)
- Time for Loving (1983) - Donna scandalizzata
- Vacanze di Natale (1983) - Nonna Marchetti
- Il tassinaro (1983) - Party Guest
- Sfrattato cerca casa equo canone (1983) - Donna che vive sull'autobus (uncredited)
- Mamma Ebe (1985)
- Love at First Sight (1985) - Attilia
- Big Deal After 20 Years (1985) - Erminia
- Il Bi e il Ba (1986) - Woman with a Dog (uncredited)
- A Tale of Love (1986) - Assunta
- Missione eroica - I pompieri 2 (1987) - Ostessa
- Teresa (1987) - Woman from Sicily (uncredited)
- Casa mia, casa mia... (1988) - Homeless Woman (uncredited)
- The Secret (1990) - Maria
- Dark Illness (1990) - Vicina di casa (uncredited)
- Occhio alla perestrojka (1990) - Donna al mercato (uncredited)
- Faccione (1991)
- Schiaffi alla luna (1991)
- Ricky & Barabba (1992)
- Amami (1993) - Gianna
- Who Killed Pasolini? (1995) - Donna Idroscalo
- Giovani e belli (1996)
- Escoriandoli (1996)
- The Scent of the Night (1998) - Cameriera (uncredited)
- Una vita non violenta (1999)
- Regina Coeli (2000) - Gattara
