= Achille Manzotti =

Italian television and film producer

- Born: 10 November 1943; Fara Gera d'Adda, Italy
- Died: 20 July 2007 (aged 63); Rome, Italy
- Occupations: Television and film producer

Achille Manzotti (10 November 1943 – 20 July 2007) was an Italian television and film producer.

Born in Fara Gera d'Adda, after some experiences as a musician, in the 1970s Manzotti moved to Milan where he became manager of a number of local comedians. Thanks to the friendship with the actor Renato Pozzetto, after becoming his agent he started to produce his films, starting from Luna di miele in tre (1976).

Initially specialized in comedies, from the late 1970s he also produced numerous art films directed by Nanni Moretti, Alberto Lattuada, Luigi Comencini, Volker Schlöndorff, among others. In the 1990s he mainly focused his activities on producing TV-series.

== Filmography ==
- Luna di miele in tre (1976)
- Sturmtruppen (1976)
- Ecco noi per esempio... (1977)
- Saxofone (1978)
- Neapolitan Mystery (1978)
- Per vivere meglio, divertitevi con noi (1978)
- Hot Potato (1979)
- Uno contro l'altro, praticamente amici (1980)
- Prickly Pears (1980)
- Nessuno è perfetto (1981)
- Porca vacca (1982)
- Cercasi Gesù (1982)
- The Girl from Trieste, (1982)
- Un povero ricco (1983)
- Mani di fata (1983)
- Bonnie and Clyde Italian Style (1983)
- The Story of Piera (1983)
- Questo e Quello (1983)
- Il ragazzo di campagna (1984)
- Sweet Body of Bianca (1984)
- The Future Is Woman (1984)
- È arrivato mio fratello (1985)
- Light Blast (1985)
- Sogni e bisogni (1985) (TV)
- Nothing Underneath (1985)
- The Mass Is Ended (1985)
- La Bonne (1986)
- Da Grande (1987)
- The Invisible Ones (1988)
- Etoile (1988)
- The Witches' Sabbath (1988)
- Too Beautiful to Die (1988)
- Casa mia casa mia... (1988)
- Fratelli d'Italia (1989)
- Metamorphosis (1989)
- Burro (1989)
- Stradivari (1989)
- Two Evil Eyes (1990)
- Beyond Darkness (1990)
- Stubborn Fate (1992)
- All Ladies Do It (1992)
- Amico mio (1993-8) (TV)
- Farfalle (1997)
- Un prete tra noi (1997) (TV)
- Mio figlio ha 70 anni (1999) (TV)
- Camici bianchi (2001) (TV)
- Era mio fratello (2007) (TV)
