= Le nuove comiche =

- Directed by: Neri Parenti
- Written by: Alessandro Bencivenni; Leo Benvenuti; Piero De Bernardi; Neri Parenti; Domenico Saverni
- Produced by: Mario Cecchi Gori; Vittorio Cecchi Gori
- Starring: Paolo Villaggio; Renato Pozzetto
- Cinematography: Sandro D'Eva
- Edited by: Sergio Montanari
- Music by: Bruno Zambrini
- Release date: 14 October 1994
- Running time: 102 minutes
- Country: Italy
- Language: Italian

Le nuove comiche is a 1994 Italian comedy film directed by Neri Parenti.

It is the third and final installment in the Comiche trilogy, preceded by Le comiche (1990) and Le comiche 2 (1991).

== Cast ==
- Paolo Villaggio as Paolo
- Renato Pozzetto as Renato
- Ramona Badescu as Ramona
- Antonio Allocca as the conductor
- Roberto Caporali as Maestro
- Denys Ganio as Romeo
- Claudia Zaccari as Juliet
- Jimmy Ghione as Ramona's boyfriend
- Luigi Petrucci as judge Achille Parenti
- Sonia Viviani as the judge's wife
- Renato Cestiè as the child's father
- Manuela Morabito as the child's mother
- Isa Gallinelli as a social worker
- Sergio Gibello as a social worker
- Bruno Di Luia as the fugitive
- Guerrino Crivello as Maestro's assistant
- Sandro Ghiani as the safe manager
- Sergio Di Pinto as the robber
