= Vacanze di Natale '95 =

- Directed by: Neri Parenti
- Written by: Neri Parenti; Enrico Vanzina; Carlo Vanzina
- Produced by: Aurelio De Laurentiis
- Starring: Massimo Boldi; Luke Perry; Christian De Sica; Elizabeth Nottoli; Claire Farwell; Cristiana Capotondi; Paolo Bonacelli
- Cinematography: Gianlorenzo Battaglia
- Edited by: Sergio Montanari
- Music by: Manuel De Sica
- Distributed by: Filmauro
- Release date: 15 December 1995 (Italy)
- Running time: 95 min
- Countries: Italy; United States
- Language: Italian
- Box office: $12 million (Italy)

Vacanze di Natale '95 (also known as Christmas Vacation ’95) is a 1995 Italian Christmas comedy film directed by Neri Parenti.

== Plot summary ==
In the north of Italy in the town of Busto Arsizio, the clumsy and foolish Lorenzo leaves with his daughter Marta for the Christmas holiday for the city of Aspen, in Colorado. In Rome, the vulgar and womanizer Remo Proietti decides to recover unnecessarily loving relationship with his young wife Kelly, and so the two depart for America, while Remo's friends bettors and gamblers alike depart for America, but for Las Vegas. The story of Remo and Lorenzo starts just as Marta, in full adolescent phase, meets the famous Luke Perry and falls in love. In Aspen, Remo also discovers that his old friend Paolone, bettor and also usurer, is spending her Christmas holidays. When Remo loses a game of cards with him, threatening him Paolone legally, Remo is forced to sign a contract stating that his rival will have a sexual relationship with his wife. But Remo turns out that Kelly has a twin sister, valley of a club in the red light: Michelle...

== Cast ==
- Massimo Boldi as Lorenzo Colombo
- Christian De Sica as Remo Proietti
- Luke Perry as himself (voiced by Francesco Prando)
- Elizabeth Nottoli as Kelly/Michelle (voiced by Francesca Guadagno/Anna Cesareni)
- Claire Ferris as Jane (voiced by Alessandra Korompay)
- Cristiana Capotondi as Marta Colombo
- Paolo Bonacelli as "Paolone"
- Howard Ross as Bob (voiced by Davide Marzi)
- Maurizio Mattioli as Remo's friend

== Reception ==
The film was the second most popular Italian film in Italy for the year, behind Viaggi di nozze, with a gross of 10.9 billion lire ($6.9 million). It went on to gross over $12 million.

== See also ==
- List of Christmas films
