= Infelici e contenti =

- Italian theatrical release poster
- Directed by: Neri Parenti
- Written by: Vittorio Cecchi Gori; Rodolfo Sonego; Neri Parenti
- Starring: Renato Pozzetto; Ezio Greggio; Marina Suma
- Cinematography: Sandro D'Eva
- Edited by: Sergio Montanari
- Music by: Bruno Zambrini
- Distributed by: Variety Distribution
- Release date: 1992
- Running time: 101 min
- Country: Italy
- Language: Italian

Infelici e contenti (lit. 'Unhappily ever after') is a 1992 Italian comedy film directed by Neri Parenti.

== Plot ==
After becoming the victim of a car accident, former bank employee and water polo champion Aldo is forced to spend the rest of his life as a wheelchair user. When his wife Alessandra leaves for the August holidays, she sends their dog Peppino to the kennels, and books a room in a nursing home run by nuns for Aldo. Here, Aldo meets Vittorio, a blind man who is trafficking counterfeit goods. Vittorio shares a room with a Spanish nurse, Sister Teresa, whom he often harasses, and with whom they will partake in a trip to Sanremo, chasing the sale of counterfeit Rolex watches.

The trip involves a series of adventures. They meet up with two young girls from the nursing home, Ornella and Sara, who turn out to be thieves. Vittorio has a fling with Valeria, Aldo's sister during a visit to her house. There is also a narrow escape from some men to whom Vittorio owes money. One evening Vittorio and Aldo meet Petrelli, an engineer, in a casino, who turns out to be the man who hit Aldo with his car three years earlier. Petrelli lends Aldo a million in casino chips. When Aldo has accrued a fair amount of winnings, he goes to return the chips to Petrelli, to cash in on a favour that Petrelli promised at the time of the accident, that he would allow Aldo to stay in his villa.

When Aldo and Vittorio arrive at Petrelli's villa, he seems less than pleased to see them, but agrees to host them for the night - despite Vittorio's opposition as he senses something amiss. During the night, Vittorio discovers that Alessandra is there, and has decided to leave Aldo and start a relationship with Petrelli, as she has had enough of her husband's disability.

Rather than tell Aldo about his discovery, Vittorio sneaks onto Petrelli's yacht and attacks him with his stick. Once they return home, Alessandra returns to pick up Aldo, and Aldo learns what has happened to Petrelli from the TV news. Petrelli is now also forced to use a wheelchair as a result of Vittorio's attack. Because of this, Alessandra returns to her husband. Vittorio disappears forever, satisfied that his friend will have his wife by his side.

== Cast ==
- Renato Pozzetto: Aldo
- Ezio Greggio: Vittorio
- Marina Suma: Alessandra
- Roberto Bisacco: Petrilli
- Francesca D'Aloja: Ornella
- Yvonne Sciò: Sara
