= The Face with Two Left Feet =

- Italian: John Travolto... da un insolito destino
- Directed by: Neri Parenti
- Written by: Massimo Franciosa; Neri Parenti
- Starring: Giuseppe Spezia
- Cinematography: Alberto Spagnoli
- Edited by: Mario Morra
- Music by: Paolo Vasile
- Release date: 4 May 1979
- Running time: 100 minutes
- Country: Italy
- Language: Italian

The Face with Two Left Feet (Italian: John Travolto... da un insolito destino), also known as The Lonely Destiny of John Travolto, is a 1979 Italian comedy film directed by Neri Parenti.

== Cast ==
- Giuseppe Spezia as Gianni
- Angelo Infanti as Raoul
- Gloria Piedimonte as Gloria
- Franco Agostini as Alvin
- Claudio Bigagli as Claudio
- Massimo Giuliani as Massimo
- Adriana Russo as Adriana
- Massimo Vanni as Paolo
- Sonia Viviani as Deborah
- Ilona Staller as Ilona
- Enzo Cannavale as Caruso
