= Natale in crociera =

- Directed by: Neri Parenti
- Written by: Alessandro Bencivenni; Domenico Saverni; Fausto Brizzi; Neri Parenti
- Produced by: Aurelio De Laurentiis; Luigi De Laurentiis
- Starring: Christian De Sica; Michelle Hunziker; Fabio De Luigi; Aída Yéspica; Alessandro Siani; Nancy Brilli
- Cinematography: Giovanni Canevari
- Edited by: Luca Montanari
- Music by: Bruno Zambrini
- Release date: December 14, 2007
- Running time: 103 minutes
- Country: Italy
- Language: Italian
- Box office: $37,350,000

Natale in crociera (lit. 'Christmas on a cruise') is a 2007 Italian Christmas comedy film directed by Neri Parenti.

== Cast ==
- Christian De Sica as Paolo Cioffa
- Michelle Hunziker as Michela Bacci
- Fabio De Luigi as Luigi Coppia
- Aída Yéspica as Magda Venni
- Alessandro Siani as Felice Zanchi
- Nancy Brilli as Francesca Zanchi
- Alessia Mancini as Anna
- Maurizio Aiello as Piero
- Brando Taccini as Federico Cioffa
- George Hilton as the Captain
- Luis Molteni as the chubby guy
- Daniele Bossari as himself

== See also ==
- List of Christmas films
