= Natale a Miami =

- Directed by: Neri Parenti
- Written by: Fausto Brizzi; Marco Martani; Neri Parenti
- Produced by: Aurelio De Laurentiis
- Starring: Massimo Boldi; Christian De Sica; Massimo Ghini; Francesco Mandelli; Paolo Ruffini; Giuseppe Sanfelice; Vanessa Hessler
- Cinematography: Tani Canevari
- Edited by: Luca Montanari
- Music by: Bruno Zambrini
- Release date: December 16, 2005
- Running time: 96 minutes
- Country: Italy
- Language: Italian
- Box office: $25,643,184

Natale a Miami (lit. 'Christmas in Miami') is a 2005 Italian Christmas comedy film directed by Neri Parenti.

== Cast ==
- Christian De Sica as Giorgio Bassi
- Massimo Boldi as Ranuccio Ghisa
- Massimo Ghini as Mario
- Francesco Mandelli as Paolo Ghisa
- Paolo Ruffini as Diego
- Giuseppe Sanfelice as Lorenzo
- Vanessa Hessler as Stella
- Raffaella Bergé as Daniela
- Natalie Miller as Kelly
- Caterina Vertova as Tiziana
- Valerie Zach as Donatella
- Danielle Hollenshade as Fiona
- Solofa Fatu as Big Kishi
- Michael Vadnal as the killer
- Gianna Paola Scaffidi as Justine
- Marc Macaulay as a policeman
- Ethan S. Smith as a policeman
- Massimiliano Mursia as Giulio
- Brooke Newton as Jane
- Angelica Ross as Sharon
- AnnaLynne McCord as Susy

== See also ==
- List of Christmas films
