= Le comiche 2 =

- Directed by: Neri Parenti
- Written by: Alessandro Bencivenni; Leo Benvenuti; Piero De Bernardi; Neri Parenti; Domenico Saverni
- Produced by: Mario Cecchi Gori; Vittorio Cecchi Gori
- Starring: Paolo Villaggio; Renato Pozzetto
- Cinematography: Sandro D'Eva
- Edited by: Sergio Montanari
- Music by: Bruno Zambrini
- Distributed by: Variety Distribution
- Release date: 20 December 1991
- Running time: 87 minutes
- Country: Italy
- Language: Italian
- Box office: $5.2 million (Italy)

Le comiche 2 is a 1991 Italian comedy film directed by Neri Parenti.

It is the sequel to 1990 film Le comiche and the second installment in the Comiche trilogy. A sequel entitled Le nuove comiche was released in 1994.

== Cast ==
- Paolo Villaggio as Paolo
- Renato Pozzetto as Renato
- Roberto Della Casa as the lawyer
- Paul Müller as the Colonel
- Giulio Donnini as the judge
- Antonio Allocca as the butler
- Loredana Romito as Francesca
- Angelo Pellegrino as Francesca's husband
- Alfiero Toppetti as the judge's son
- Catherine Zago as th judge's wife
- Romano Puppo as the thief
- Maurizio Fabbri as the billposter
- Giuliano Ghiselli as the high prelate
- Gianni Franco as the child's dad
- Sergio Testori as the blind priest
- Giulio Massimini as Massimini
- Mohammed Badr-Salem as a Berber
- John Armstead as the commander of the legionaries
