= Vacanze ai Caraibi =

- Directed by: Neri Parenti
- Written by: Neri Parenti; Fausto Brizzi; Marco Martani; Domenico Saverni; Christian De Sica
- Produced by: Mario Gianani; Lorenzo Mieli
- Starring: Christian De Sica; Massimo Ghini; Angela Finocchiaro; Dario Bandiera; Ilaria Spada; Luca Argentero
- Cinematography: Gino Sgreva
- Edited by: Luca Montanari
- Music by: Bruno Zambrini
- Release date: December 16, 2015
- Running time: 100 minutes
- Country: Italy
- Language: Italian

Vacanze ai Caraibi (lit. 'Holidays in the Caribbean') is a 2015 Italian comedy film directed by Neri Parenti.

== Cast ==
- Christian De Sica as Mario Grossi Tubi
- Massimo Ghini as Ottavio Vianale
- Angela Finocchiaro as Gianna
- Dario Bandiera as Adriano Fiore
- Ilaria Spada as Claudia
- Luca Argentero as Fausto
- Maria Luisa De Crescenzo as Anna Pia
- Cristina Marino as Maria Claudia
- Francisco Cruz as the butler

== See also ==
- List of Christmas films
