= The Jokes (film) =

2004 film

- Directed by: Carlo Vanzina
- Written by: Enrico Vanzina; Carlo Vanzina
- Produced by: Aurelio De Laurentiis
- Starring: Gigi Proietti; Enzo Salvi; Fichi d'India; Biagio Izzo; Éva Henger
- Cinematography: Claudio Zamarion
- Edited by: Luca Montanari
- Music by: Andrea Guerra
- Release date: 2004
- Running time: 90 min
- Country: Italy
- Language: Italian

The Jokes (Italian: Le barzellette) is a 2004 Italian anthology comedy film written and directed by Carlo Vanzina.

== Plot ==
The film is divided into many small episodes: various characters represent the typical vices and comedy of Italian society (especially Rome) early 2000. These characters are ruled by the King of Jokes, in Paradise, which is commissioned by San Gennaro who promise them eternal life.

== Cast ==
- Gigi Proietti as God / Waiter / Mexican Singer / Farmer / Lawyer and his client / Conductor
- Enzo Salvi as Enzo / Sandro / Grandma / Client at Bar
- Carlo Buccirosso as Mr. Rossi / Maniac
- Fichi d'India as Cactuses / Aliens / Maz & Max / Mothers / Firefighters
- Biagio Izzo as Doorman / Man in the sauna / Gay man / Italian prisoner / Mafiaman
- Max Giusti as Mario
- Vito as Traffic cop / Postman
- Éva Henger
- Marco Messeri as Surgeon
- Chiara Noschese as Mario's wife
- Simona Guarino as Rossi's wife
- Lorenzo Flaherty as Nobleman
- Paolo Seganti as Pirate
- Gianfranco Barra

== See also ==
- List of Italian films of 2004
