= Christmas on the Nile =

2002 film directed by Neri Parenti

Natale sul Nilo
- Directed by: Neri Parenti
- Written by: Neri Parenti; Fausto Brizzi; Marco Martani; Lorenzo De Luca; Andrea Margiotta
- Produced by: Aurelio De Laurentiis; Luigi De Laurentiis
- Starring: Christian De Sica; Massimo Boldi; Enzo Salvi; Biagio Izzo; Fichi d'India
- Cinematography: Gianlorenzo Battaglia
- Edited by: Luca Montanari
- Music by: Bruno Zambrini
- Production company: Cinecittà
- Distributed by: Filmauro Home Video
- Release date: 2002
- Running time: 103 min
- Country: Italy – Egypt – Spain – United Kingdom
- Language: Italian
- Box office: 28M euros

Natale sul Nilo (Christmas on the Nile) is a 2002 Italian Christmas comedy film directed by Neri Parenti. In Italy the film was a huge commercial success, grossing 28,302,293 euros.

== Plot ==
The Roman lawyer Fabio Ciulla (Cristian De Sica) goes on holiday to Egypt. He is pursuing his wife, whom he has repeatedly cheated on, in an attempt to persuade her to forgive him. The police sergeant Enrico Ombroni (Massimo Boldi) also travels to the land of the Pharaohs with a guard (Biagio Izzo) to get his young daughter (Lucrezia Piaggio) away from a musical group of which she is a fan. The two protagonists meet in Egypt for an exchange of misunderstandings, since Ciulla by mistake has a love affair with a young girl while his wife forgives him. The girl is engaged to the son of Ciulla, who plans to get rid of the tangle by a clever ruse. Meanwhile Ombroni's daughter runs away with the crew of her favorite musical group, who have come to Egypt to shoot an exotic video.

== Cast ==
- Christian De Sica: Avv. Fabio Ciulla
- Massimo Boldi: Gen. Enrico Ombroni
- Fichi d'India: Max & Bruno
- Enzo Salvi: Oscar Tufello
- Biagio Izzo: Mar. Gennaro Saltalaquaglia
- Mabel Lozano: Gianna Ciulla
- Nuria de la Fuente: Paola Rampelli
- Paolo Conticini: Capitan
- Manu Fullola: Marco Ciulla
- Lucrezia Piaggio:Lorella Ombroni
- Iuliana Ierugan: show girl A
- Kimberly Greene: show girl B
- Gloria Anselmi: show girl C
- Luisella Tuttavilla: show girl D
- Maria De Filippi: herself
