= L'adolescente =

1976 film by Alfonso Brescia

- Directed by: Alfonso Brescia
- Written by: Aldo Crudo; Piero Regnoli; Alfonso Brescia
- Story by: Aldo Crudo
- Produced by: Hilda Film
- Starring: Tuccio Musumeci; Daniela Giordano
- Cinematography: Silvio Fraschetti
- Edited by: Liliana Serra
- Music by: Alessandro Alessandroni
- Distributed by: Variety Distribution
- Release date: 19 February 1976
- Running time: 92 minutes
- Country: Italy
- Language: Italian

L'adolescente (The Adolescent) is a 1976 commedia sexy all'italiana film directed by Alfonso Brescia. It starred Sonia Viviani, Daniela Giordano, Dagmar Lassander and Malisa Longo.

== Plot ==
Vito Gnaula and Grazia Serritella are a Sicilian couple who marry after a series of turbulent events but Grazia is not willing to consummate their marriage, showing her father's sudden death as an excuse. Vito starts making sexual advances to his late father-in-law's secretary Katia but he has to avoid any scandal for he may lose the rights to his rich father-in-law's inheritance. However, the arrival of Grazia's teenage niece Serenella moves things well beyond Vito's control.

== Cast ==
- Tuccio Musumeci as Vito Gnaula
- Daniela Giordano as Grazia Serritella
- Sonia Viviani as Serenella, the niece
- Raffaele Sparanero as Antonio
- Dagmar Lassander as Katia Solvj
- Aldo Giuffrè as Marshal of the Carabinieri
- Giacomo Furia as the Notary
- Marcello Martana as Lance Corporal Bragadin
- Franca Scagnetti as Carmeluzza
- Malisa Longo as Frau Marlene
- Maria Bosco
- Gaetano Balistreri
- Aldo Cecconi
- Adriano Corneli
- Roberto Giraudo
- Nello Pazzafini

== Reception ==
Marco Giusti calls the film a "triumph of Sonia Viviani modelled after Gloria Guida, but in a Regnoli-Brescia version", and praises the female cast led by the graces of Dagmar Lassander and Daniela Giordano.

== Bibliography ==
- Giusti, Marco (1999). dizionario dei film italiani STRACULT [sic]. Cles: Sterling & Kupfer. ISBN 88-200-2919-7.

== See also ==
- List of Italian films of 1976
