= Luna di miele in tre =

- Directed by: Carlo Vanzina
- Written by: Carlo Vanzina; Enrico Vanzina
- Produced by: Achille Manzotti
- Starring: Renato Pozzetto; Stefania Casini; Vincent Gardenia
- Cinematography: Alberto Spagnoli
- Music by: Armando Trovajoli
- Release date: 1976
- Country: Italy
- Language: Italian

Luna di miele in tre (Honeymoon in three) is a 1976 Italian comedy film. It marks the directorial debut of Carlo Vanzina.

== Plot ==
On the eve of his wedding trip to Sanremo, Alfredo Riva learns that he has won a contest by "Playmen," with the prize being a five-day vacation in Jamaica with the beautiful playmate Christine, day and night. Accompanied by his unsuspecting wife, Graziella, Alfredo reaches the Caribbean island but must resort to a series of subterfuges, leading to unforeseen expenses.

== Cast ==
- Renato Pozzetto as Alfredo Riva
- Stefania Casini as Graziella Luraghi
- Vincent Gardenia as Frank
- Kirsten Gille as Christine/Rebecca
- Harry Reems as Gilbert Blain
- Cochi Ponzoni as Aldo Santarelli
- Felice Andreasi as Hotel Director
- Massimo Boldi as Adamo
- Giulio Rinaldi as Graziella's Father

== See also ==
- List of Italian films of 1976
