= Romano Puppo =

Italian stuntman and actor

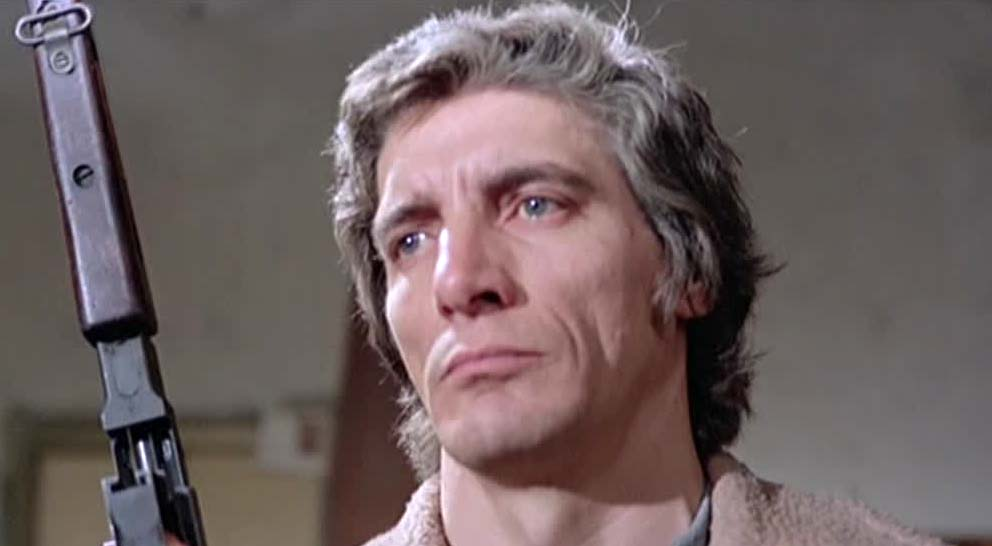
- Born: 25 March 1933; Trieste, Italy
- Died: 11 May 1994 (aged 61); Trieste, Italy
- Occupation: Actor

Romano Puppo (25 March 1933 – 11 May 1994) was an Italian stuntman and actor.

== Life and career ==
Born in Rome, Puppo debuted in 1961 in the Mauro Bolognini's drama Careless, and after a number of very minor roles he soon became a regular of Italian genre cinema in roles of henchmen and villains. Mainly active in Spaghetti Westerns and Poliziotteschi films, he was also cast as the Paolo Villaggio's antagonist in a number of comedies. He was hired as Lee Van Cleef's stuntman and double stand-in by director Gianfranco Parolini for his Sabata trilogy, and was one of his pallbearers in 1989. He served as his stuntman in a number of films including Sabata (1969), Commandos (1968) along Giampiero Albertini, and The Good, the Bad and the Ugly (1966) along Benito Stefanelli.

Puppo died in a motor scooter accident while having a heart attack, aged 61.

== Selected filmography ==
- The Tramplers (1965) - Paine Cordeen
- Agent 3S3: Massacre in the Sun (1966) - Man on Plane #2
- Massacre Time (1966) - Tall Scott Henchman (uncredited)
- The Big Gundown (1966) - Rocky, Widow's Ranchero
- The Good, the Bad and the Ugly (1966) - Slim (Member of Angel Eyes' Gang) (uncredited)
- Death Rides a Horse (1967) - Clell
- Day of Anger (1967) - Hart Perkins (uncredited)
- Seven Times Seven (1968) - Prisoner Carrying Garbage Can (uncredited)
- Gunman Sent by God (1968) - Badman
- Beyond the Law (1968) - Sam - Burton Bandit
- Madigan's Millions (1968) - Steward (uncredited)
- Rita of the West (1968) - Zorro
- Commandos (1968) - Dino
- Death on High Mountain (1969) - Deputy
- Bootleggers (1969) - Boss' Bodyguard
- Sabata (1969) - Rocky Bendato, Stengel Henchman
- Boot Hill (1969) - Finch henchman
- Chuck Moll (1970) - Burt
- Colt in the Hand of the Devil (1970) - Soldier (uncredited)
- Dead Men Ride (1971) - Newman
- Trinity Is Still My Name (1971) - Hitman (uncredited)
- Trinity and Sartana Are Coming (1972) - Captain Bill McCorney (uncredited)
- The Master Touch (1972) - Miller's Lieutenant
- The Sicilian Connection (1972) - Hood (uncredited)
- Il Nemico In Vista (1973) - Commando
- Those Dirty Dogs (1973) - Soldier in Dormitory Fistfight (uncredited)
- Deaf Smith & Johnny Ears (1973) - Bull, Morton's Goon
- The Big Game (1973) - Alberto
- The Funny Face of the Godfather (1973) - Uomo del padrino
- ...E il terzo giorno arrivò il corvo (1973) - Henry Sloane (uncredited)
- Mr. Hercules Against Karate (1973) - Football Player (uncredited)
- Mean Frank and Crazy Tony (1973) - Assassin
- Three Tough Guys (1974) - Hood
- Street Law (1974) - Ringleader
- The Beast (1974) - Dutch Driver
- The White, the Yellow, and the Black (1975) - Kady
- Loaded Guns (1975) - Man in the Tavern (uncredited)
- El clan de los inmorales (1975)
- Cry, Onion! (1975) - Stinky
- Africa Express (1975)
- Lo sgarbo (1975)
- The Loves and Times of Scaramouche (1976)
- Street People (1976) - Fortunate
- The Big Racket (1976) - Doringo
- The Heroin Busters (1977) - Enforcer
- California (1977) - Gary Luke
- Gangbuster (1977) - Peseti Henchman
- Interno di un convento (1978)
- China 9, Liberty 37 (1978) - Zeb / Zeb's brother
- The Uranium Conspiracy (1978) - Boatswain
- Savana - Sesso e diamanti (1978) - Kent
- The Great Alligator River (1979) - Peter
- Speed Cross (1980) - Kurt Schmidbauer
- Contraband (1980) - Enforcer
- Day of the Cobra (1980) - Silvestri
- Speed Driver (1980) - Dave
- Buddy Goes West (1981) - Slim Henchman (uncredited)
- Great White (1981) - Briley (uncredited)
- The Girl from Trieste (1982) - Toni
- 2019, After the Fall of New York (1983) - Ratchet
- Escape from the Bronx (1983) - Trash's Father
- Tuareg – The Desert Warrior (1984) - Soldier
- Good King Dagobert (1984) - Argobal
- Who Is Afraid Of Dracula? (1985) - Frankenstein
- Joan Lui (1985) - Assassino
- Scuola di ladri - Parte seconda (1987) - Nostromo
- Robowar (1988) - Cpl. Neil Corey
- Cop Game (1988) - Skipper
- Der Commander (1988) - Angelo
- Ghoulies II (1988) - Zampano
- Sinbad of the Seven Seas (1989) - Captain
- After Death (1989) - Zombie Leader (uncredited)
- Born to Fight (1989) - Alex Bross
- I Won the New Year's Lottery (1989)
- Le comiche 2 (1991) - Ladro (final film role)
