= Natale in Sudafrica =

- Directed by: Neri Parenti
- Written by: Neri Parenti; Alessandro Bencivenni; Domenico Saverni; Christian De Sica; Paolo Logli
- Produced by: Aurelio De Laurentiis; Luigi De Laurentiis
- Starring: Christian De Sica; Belén Rodríguez; Giorgio Panariello; Massimo Ghini; Laura Esquivel; Max Tortora; Serena Autieri; Barbara Tabita
- Cinematography: Tani Canevari
- Edited by: Luca Montanari
- Music by: Bruno Zambrini
- Release date: 17 December 2010
- Running time: 105 minutes
- Country: Italy
- Language: Italian

Natale in Sudafrica (lit. 'Christmas in South Africa') is a 2010 Italian Christmas comedy film directed by Neri Parenti.

== Cast ==
- Christian De Sica as Carlo Boffa
- Belén Rodríguez as Angela Ladesse
- Giorgio Panariello as Ligabue Della Chianina
- Massimo Ghini as Massimo Rischio
- Laura Esquivel as Laura Rischio
- Max Tortora as Giorgio Boffa
- Serena Autieri as Marta Boffa
- Barbara Tabita as Susanna Boffa
- Brenno Placido as Mauro
- Alessandro Cacelli as Vitellozzo Della Chianina

== See also ==
- List of Christmas films
