= Tuccio Musumeci =

Italian actor and comedian (born 1934)

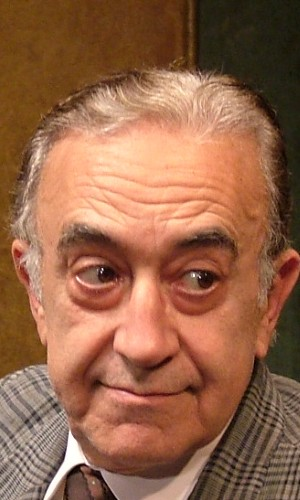
- Born: 20 April 1934 (age 92); Catania
- Occupation: Actor

Tuccio Musumeci (born 20 April 1934) is an Italian actor and comedian.

== Life and career ==
Born in Catania, Musumeci started his career in the 1960s, performing in local cabarets and avanspettacolo companies.

The turning point in his career was entering the stage company of the Teatro Stabile di Catania with whom he began acting in plays, mostly comedies, both in Italian and in Sicilian.

Musumeci intensively worked for television (beginning in 1959) and in the theater. Less active on films, after a bit part in The Leopard, he appeared in a good number of comedy films between the 1970s and 1980s, sometimes in leading roles.

== Selected filmography ==
- La ragazza del prete (1970)
- Holy Water Joe (1971)
- The Seduction of Mimi (1972)
- Il lumacone (1974)
- Virility (1974)
- L'adolescente (1976)
- La gatta da pelare (1981)
- Open Doors (1990)
- La matassa (2009)
- Italo (2014)
- Strangeness (2022)
