= Megan Gale =

Australian model and actress

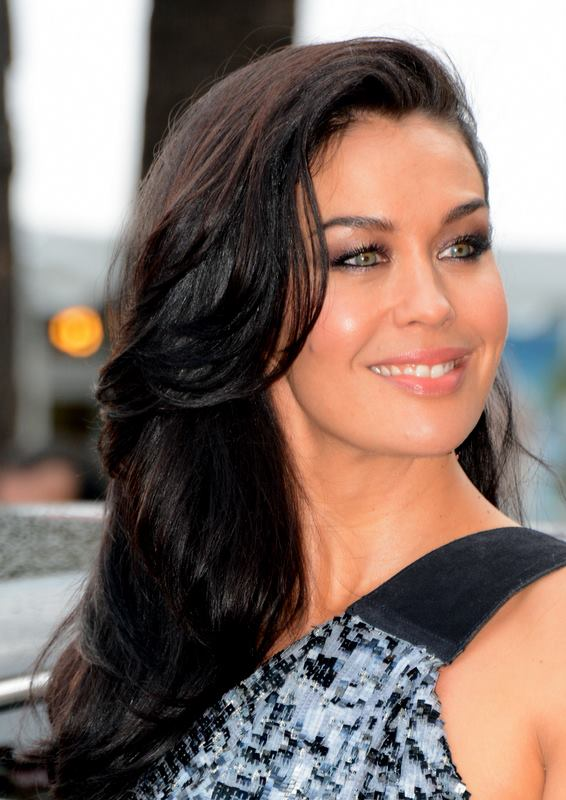
- Megan Gale at the 2015 Cannes Film Festival
- Born: Megan Kate Gale; 7 August 1975 (age 51); Medina, Western Australia
- Occupations: Model, actress
- Years active: 1993−present
- Partner(s): Shaun Hampson (2011–present)
- Children: 2
- Modeling information
- Height: 182 cm (5 ft 11 3/4 in)
- Hair color: Brown
- Eye color: Green
- Agency: Chic Celebrity Management, Atelier Management
- Website: www.megangale.com

Megan Kate Gale (born 7 August 1975) is an Australian model and actress. Born in Medina, Western Australia, Gale won a modelling contest when she was 18 in her home town. In 1999 she was cast in a series of commercials for Vodafone Italy. This led to wide exposure in both Italy and her homeland Australia, and she appeared in Vodafone advertising until 2006. Gale has also appeared in Italian movies and television shows, and as an actress, Gale played Fatma in The Water Diviner (2014) and Valkyrie in Mad Max: Fury Road (2015).

In 2005 Gale became the national ambassador for Kids Help Line and in 2009 she was appointed the first official National Ambassador for the Red Cross.

== Early life ==
Born in Parmelia, Western Australia, Gale's father is English and her mother is part Māori. She is the youngest of three children with two older brothers.

== Career ==
=== Modelling ===
Gale won a modelling competition in Perth at 18. After several years of modelling, Gale rose to fame when in 1999 was cast to appear in a series of advertisements for an Italian telecommunication company, Omnitel (now Vodafone Italy); she appeared in the company's advertising until 2006. She was also retained by the Australian Tourist Commission in 2003 as 'their face of Australia in Italy'. Gale has graced the covers of Australian Marie Claire, Grazia, Gioia, Italian and Australian GQ, Italian Maxim, Australian InStyle and featured in editorials for Australian Cosmopolitan and Vogue Italia.

Gale has modeled for Italian fashion houses including Gianfranco Ferré, Genny, Gai Mattiolo and runway work for Mariella Burani and Angelo Marani at Milan Fashion Week. Gale also favours many Australian designers, such as Colette Dinnigan, Kirrily Johnston, Lisa Ho, Willow and Alex Perry. In 2006, she was the fashion commentator for the Australian television awards, the Logies.

In January 2008, Gale announced her retirement from runway modelling after 15 years and walked the catwalk for the last time just weeks later at a David Jones winter collection launch in Sydney. Her final outfit was the Wonder Woman outfit she was to wear in the still-shelved film Justice League of America. In March 2011, Gale returned to the runway and closed Alex Perry's 2011 Melbourne Fashion Festival show.

August 2011 marked Gale's 10th anniversary with department store David Jones, the longest held fashion contract in Australia. That same month, Gale became an ambassador for L'Oréal Paris, joining Beyoncé, Jennifer Lopez and Gwen Stefani. Gale appeared in a L'Oréal shampoo commercial in Australia, New Zealand and Italy.

In May 2026, 20 years after she was featured in a commercial for Vodafone Italy (now Fastweb), Gale was cast in a commercial for Italian telecommunications company Iliad Italia.

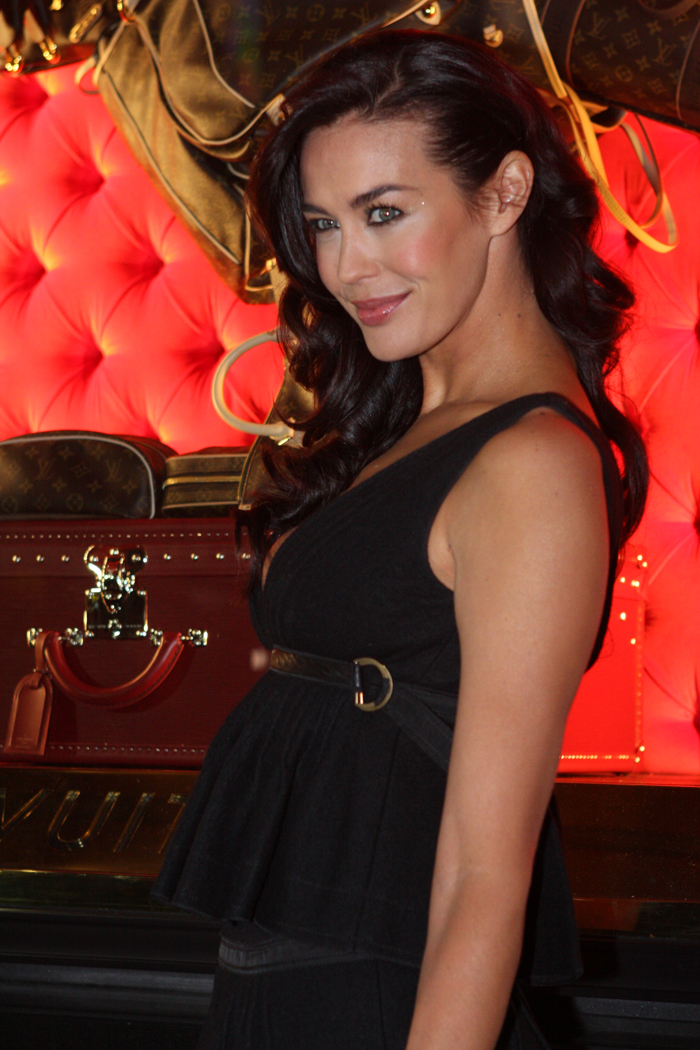
Gale in 2011

=== Acting ===
Gale has appeared in the Italian movies Vacanze di Natale 2000, Body Guards as herself in both movies, and in Stregati dalla luna (Bewitched by the Moon in Italian) as "Vivianna". She also had a cameo part in the 2005 movie Stealth where she played Dr. Orbit's secretary. In January 2008, it was announced that she had been offered the part of Wonder Woman in the upcoming George Miller movie version of Justice League of America, before the project was put on hold and eventually cancelled. In August 2009, Gale completed filming a role in her first Australian feature film, the romantic comedy I Love You Too, where she played Italian supermodel "Francesca Moretti". Gale also appeared in 2014 Russell Crowe's drama film The Water Diviner in the role of Fatma, and in 2015 Miller's post-apocalyptic action film Mad Max: Fury Road in the role of the Valkyrie.

=== Swimwear range ===
In 2010, Gale launched a swimwear label, "Isola". The line is carried at department stores, including David Jones.

=== Television ===
In 2001, Gale presented the Sanremo Music Festival. In 2005, she became a guest reporter for Nine Network travel show Getaway from October 2005 to June 2006. She also worked with Mike Munro as co-host of the nine-episode Australian documentary TV show What a Year, which first aired on the Nine Network on 2 October 2006. Gale also appeared briefly on Australia's Next Top Model, Cycle 4 in episode 4. She also appeared in cycle 6 (2010), in which the girls of that cycle were featured in Isola's first fashion show.

Gale also became the National Ambassador for Kids Help Line in February 2005. In 2009, she was appointed the first official National Ambassador for The Red Cross.

In early 2011 Gale became the new host of Project Runway Australia where she would also serve as judge and executive producer of the design-based reality show. The new season premiered on 4 July 2011 on Arena. In 2016, Gale became a permanent judge on Australia's Next Top Model, its final season.

== Personal life ==
Gale dated comedian Andy Lee from 2006 to 2010, splitting amicably and remaining friends.

In January 2011, Gale began a relationship with Carlton (and later Richmond) footballer Shaun Hampson. On 20 July 2017, the couple announced their engagement. They have two children, a son and a daughter.

== Filmography ==
=== Television ===
Year	Title	Role	Notes
2005	Getaway	Herself/Guest Reporter	Recurring role
2007	Australia's Next Top Model	Herself/Judge	Recurring role
2011	Project Runway Australia	Herself	Main role
2014	Wonderland	Amelia Windsor	Episode: "Standing in Line"

=== Film ===
Year	Title	Role
1999	Vacanze di Natale 2000	Herself
2000	Body Guards	Herself
2001	Stregati dalla luna	Viviana / Luna
2005	Stealth	Dr. Orbit's secretary
2010	I Love You Too	Francesca Moretti
2014	The Water Diviner	Fatma
2015	Mad Max: Fury Road	Valkyrie
2022	Three Thousand Years of Longing	Hürrem
