= Olé (film) =

- Directed by: Carlo Vanzina
- Written by: Carlo Vanzina; Enrico Vanzina
- Starring: Massimo Boldi; Vincenzo Salemme; Daryl Hannah; Enzo Salvi; Natalia Estrada; Francesca Lodo
- Edited by: Raimondo Crociani
- Music by: Andrea Guerra
- Release date: 15 December 2006
- Running time: 93 minutes
- Country: Italy
- Language: Italian

Olé is a 2006 Italian comedy film directed by Carlo Vanzina.

== Cast ==
- Massimo Boldi as Archimede Formigoni
- Vincenzo Salemme as Salvatore Rondinella
- Daryl Hannah as Maggie Granger
- Enzo Salvi as Enzo Antonelli
- Natalia Estrada as Ana Montez
- Francesca Lodo as Jennifer
- Brigitta Boccoli as Margherita
- Armando De Razza as Diego De La Vega
- Federico Zanandrea as Mongini
- Niccolò Contrino as Ugo Antonelli
- Ashley Burritt as Nicole Morrison
