= Christmas in Love =

- poster of the film
- Directed by: Neri Parenti
- Written by: Fausto Brizzi; Marco Martani; Neri Parenti
- Produced by: Aurelio De Laurentiis
- Starring: Christian De Sica; Danny DeVito; Massimo Boldi; Anna Maria Barbera; Ronn Moss; Sabrina Ferilli
- Narrated by: Christian De Sica and Massimo Boldi (introduction)
- Edited by: Luca Montanari
- Music by: Bruno Zambrini
- Production company: Cinecittà
- Distributed by: Filmauro
- Release date: 17 December 2004
- Running time: 118 minutes
- Countries: Italy; Switzerland
- Languages: Italian; English

Christmas in Love is a 2004 Christmas romantic comedy film starring Christian De Sica, Danny DeVito, Massimo Boldi, Cristiana Capotondi and Ronn Moss. The film was directed by Neri Parenti.

The film was nominated for a Golden Globe Award for Best Original Song at the 63rd Golden Globe Awards.

== Plot ==
The plot follows three intersecting stories at a ski resort in Gstaad. Fabrizio Barbetti (Christian De Sica) and Lisa Pinzoni (Sabrina Ferilli) are two remarried doctors who have continuously fought with each other since their divorce. They hate one another to such an extent that they argue in public, even on live television. Both of them unknowingly plans with their respective new partners to spend their Christmas holidays in Switzerland, not knowing the other is staying at the same resort. Eventually the two end up falling again for each other and begin planning to make their partners do so as well, so that they can end their current relationships and start a new life together. However, they ignore that Angela (Fabrizio's new wife) and Gabriele (Lisa's current husband) have been cheating on them for a year and are already in a relationship. In fact, the vacation was planned by them in order to make Fabrizio and Lisa want to get back together.

Meanwhile, soap opera superfan Concetta La Rosa (Anna Maria Barbera) wins a getaway at the resort with actor Ronn Moss. In her attempts to get close to Ronn, Concetta accidentally hits him in the head with a frying pan. He awakens with no memory of who he is, so Concetta convinces him that they are married. They spend the holiday together and have sex in Moss's hotel room. Later on the flight back to Italy, she confesses what she has done to Ronn while he is asleep. He secretly hears her and forgives her, deciding to accompany her to a party to impress her friends before returning home to Los Angeles.

Meanwhile, aging race car driver Guido Baldi (Massimo Boldi) is caught having an affair with a much younger woman named Sofia (Alena Šeredová). He retreats with her to his vacation home at the ski resort, where he unexpectedly encounters his 24-year-old daughter Monica (Cristiana Capotondi) and her much older boyfriend Brad LaGuardia (Danny Devito). Unbeknownst to Guido, Brad is actually an actor who Monica has hired to convince her father not to throw away his marriage. In the end her plan is a success as Guido's harsh reaction to Brad convinces Sofia to leave him.

The film presents three different endings. In the "romantic" ending, Fabrizio and Lisa get back together and Guido returns home to his wife. In the "sad" ending, Fabrizio and Lisa do not get back together and Guido returns home only to find his wife with a much younger man. In the joke ending, Fabrizio gets a ride back to Rome with Guido and they both fall asleep. After they are awoken by Brad, who was also asleep in the backseat, they crash into a warehouse full of fireworks.

== Actors ==
- Christian De Sica: Fabrizio Barbetti
- Danny DeVito: Brad La Guardia (voiced by Giorgio Lopez)
- Massimo Boldi: Guido Baldi
- Sabrina Ferilli: Lisa Pinzoni
- Ronn Moss: Himself (voiced by Claudio Capone)
- Anna Maria Barbera: Concetta La Rosa
- Cristiana Capotondi: Monica Baldi
- Tosca D'Aquino: Angela Barbetti
- Cesare Bocci: Gabriele Perla
- Alena Šeredová: Sofia

== See also ==
- List of Italian films of 2004
