= Enzo Salvi =

Italian actor

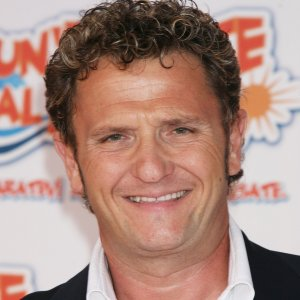
- Born: 16 August 1963 (age 62); Rome, Italy
- Years active: 1993–present
- Website: www.enzosalvi.it

Enzo Salvi (born Vincenzo Salvi; 16 August 1963 in Rome, Italy) is an Italian actor.

His most popular character is nicknamed Er Cipolla (The Onion in Romanesco dialect).

== Filmography ==
=== Films ===
- Vacanze di Natale 2000 (1999)
- Body Guards (2000)
- Merry Christmas (2001)
- Natale sul Nilo (2002)
- Natale in India (2003)
- Le barzellette (2004)
- Il ritorno del Monnezza (2005)
- Notte prima degli esami (2006)
- Olé (2006)
- Notte prima degli esami – Oggi (2007)
- 2061: An Exceptional Year (2007)
- Matrimonio alle Bahamas (2007)
- Ultimi della classe (2008) Voice
- Un'estate al mare (2008)
- La fidanzata di papà (2008)
- Many Kisses Later (2009)
- A Natale mi sposo (2010)
- Women vs. Men (2011)
- Una cella in due (2011)
- Box Office 3D: The Filmest of Films (2011)
- Wedding in Paris (2011)
- Love Is in the Air (2012)
- Operazione vacanze (2012)
- Io che amo solo te (2015)
- The Veil of Maya (2017)
- Natale da chef (2017)
- Lockdown all'italiana (2020)
- Flaminia (2024)

=== TV series ===
- 2006 – Domani è un'altra truffa
- 2007 – Di che peccato sei?
- 2009 – Piper
- 2010 - Fratelli Benvenuti
- 2010 – SMS - Squadra molto speciale
- 2011 – Notte prima degli esami '82
- 2012 – Punto su di te

=== Theatre ===
- 1993 – Seduti e abbandonati
- 1995 – Scene da un manicomio
- 1995 – Cesare contro Cesare
- 1996 – Arrivano i Buffi!
- 1997 – Fermata obbligatoria
- 2003 – A qualcuno piace Carlo
