= I due carabinieri =

- Directed by: Carlo Verdone
- Written by: Leonardo Benvenuti; Piero De Bernardi; Carlo Verdone
- Produced by: Mario Cecchi Gori; Vittorio Cecchi Gori
- Starring: Carlo Verdone; Enrico Montesano; Massimo Boldi
- Cinematography: Danilo Desideri
- Edited by: Antonio Siciliano
- Music by: Fabio Liberatori
- Release date: 1984
- Running time: 120 min
- Country: Italy
- Language: Italian
- Box office: $2,106,000 (Italy)

I due carabinieri (The Two Carabinieri) is a 1984 Italian action comedy film, directed by Carlo Verdone.

== Plot ==
Marino (Carlo Verdone) and Glauco (Enrico Montesano) enlist with the Carabinieri in order to change their lives and find stability and maturity within the military discipline of the armed force. During training, they also find a third partner in Adalberto (Massimo Boldi), sickly heir to an affluent family, also pursuing a law enforcement career in an effort to grow more independent from his over-protecting parents. The trio share various adventures until graduation, and then begin to take part in real missions, with happy-go-lucky and carefree attitude, to the point of simulating a fake police raid to a clandestine brothel in hope to get free service, partaking to confiscated cocaine, flirting with some women that are victims of phone molestations. Eventually Adalberto gets killed in action, while the friendship between Marino and Glauco seems to break down as they both love Marino's cousin, Rita. She reciprocates Glauco's love but only has brotherly affection for Marino, who feels therefore betrayed in his imaginary relationship with the woman, and attacks violently the colleague. In the end however harmony is recovered, when Glauco risks his life to save the old friend and a group of boy scouts which had been taken hostage by a madman on the same train.

== Cast ==
- Carlo Verdone: Marino Spada
- Enrico Montesano: Glauco Sperandio
- Paola Onofri: Rita
- Massimo Boldi: Adalberto Occhipinti
- Marisa Solinas: the friend of Turin
- Guido Celano: Uncle Renato
- Andrea Aureli: Commander
- John Steiner: Criminal on train
- Anna Maria Torniai: Aunt Ernestina

== Reception ==
The film was the fourth highest-grossing film in Italy for the year with a gross of $2.1 million (4.2 billion lire) from 12 key cities and the second highest-grossing local film, behind Nothing Left to Do But Cry.

== See also ==
- List of Italian films of 1984
