= Casa mia, casa mia... =

- Directed by: Neri Parenti
- Written by: Gaetano Audino; Domenico Matteucci
- Produced by: Achille Manzotti
- Starring: Renato Pozzetto; Paola Onofri; Athina Cenci
- Cinematography: Cristiano Pogany
- Edited by: Sergio Montanari
- Music by: Alberto Baldan Bembo
- Release date: March 18, 1988
- Running time: 95 minutes
- Country: Italy
- Language: Italian

Casa mia, casa mia... (lit. 'My home, my home...') is a 1988 Italian comedy film directed by Neri Parenti.

== Cast ==
- Renato Pozzetto as Mario Bartoloni
- Paola Onofri as Marina De Santis
- Athina Cenci as Countess Salviati
- Gianfranco Agus as Aldo Giannetti
- Patrizia Loreti as Elvira Cappellini
- Stefano Antonucci as Gianni Marini
- Antonio Allocca as Franco
- Clarissa Burt as Cinzia
- Antonello Fassari as Di Pietro
- Maurizio Mattioli as Elvira's partner
- Camillo Milli as the jewellery's owner
- Sonia Viviani as Aldo's wife
- Alessandra Acciai as Sandra
