= In vacanza su Marte =

- Official release poster
- Directed by: Neri Parenti
- Written by: Neri Parenti; Gianluca Bomprezzi
- Produced by: Benedetto Habib; Fabrizio Donvito; Marco Cohen
- Starring: Christian De Sica; Massimo Boldi; Lucia Mascino; Paola Minaccioni; Herbert Ballerina; Denise Tantucci; Fiammetta Cicogna; Francesco Bruni; Alessandro Bisegna; Milena Vukotic
- Cinematography: Gino Sgreva
- Edited by: Luca Montanari
- Music by: Bruno Zambrini
- Production companies: Warner Bros. Entertainment Italia; Indiana Production; Cattleya
- Distributed by: Warner Bros. Pictures
- Release date: 13 December 2020
- Running time: 89 minutes
- Country: Italy
- Language: Italian

In vacanza su Marte (lit. 'Holidays on Mars') is a 2020 Italian surreal comedy film directed by Neri Parenti.

== Plot ==
In 2030, Fabio Sinceri is due to marry his wealthy fiancée Bea and, considering that he is still legally married to his ex-wife Elena, decides to go to Mars, where there is no jurisdiction, to get married. To his misfortune, his son Giulio, who is determined to reunite his parents, catches him in the act and follows him to Mars accompanied by his fiancée Marina, who plans to expose the fake relationship between two popular influencers in order to try to gain success. Unfortunately, Giulio, during a trip to space, is sucked into a mini black hole that advances his age by about fifty years.

== Cast ==
- Christian De Sica as Fabio
- Massimo Boldi as Giulio
- Lucia Mascino as Bea
- Milena Vukotic as Tina
- Paola Minaccioni as Elena
- Herbert Ballerina as Pippo
- Denise Tantucci as Marina
- Fiammetta Cicogna as Alice
- Francesco Bruni as Dylan
- Alessandro Bisegna as young Giulio
- Simone Colombari as Lieutenant Piero Carloni
- Giovanni Guardiano as the lawyer
- Taiyo Yamanouchi as Professor Toshiro Tayo
- Cristina Cappelli as Carolina
- Simone Farinon as Michele
- Barbara Scoppa as Monica

== Production ==
Filming took place in a studio in Cinecittà.

== Release ==
The film, due to the closure of cinemas caused by the COVID-19 pandemic, did not have a theatrical distribution. On 13 December 2020, the film will be released on demand, which can be purchased or rented on the Sky Primafila, Amazon Prime Video, Apple TV, Chili, TIMvision, Infinity, Google Play Film, YouTube, Rakuten TV and PlayStation Store platforms.

The film was shown broadcast for the first time on TV on December 29 exclusively on Sky Cinema.

The film reached over 800,000 spectators on Sky Cinema in its first ten days of broadcasting.
