= Clarissa Burt =

American actress

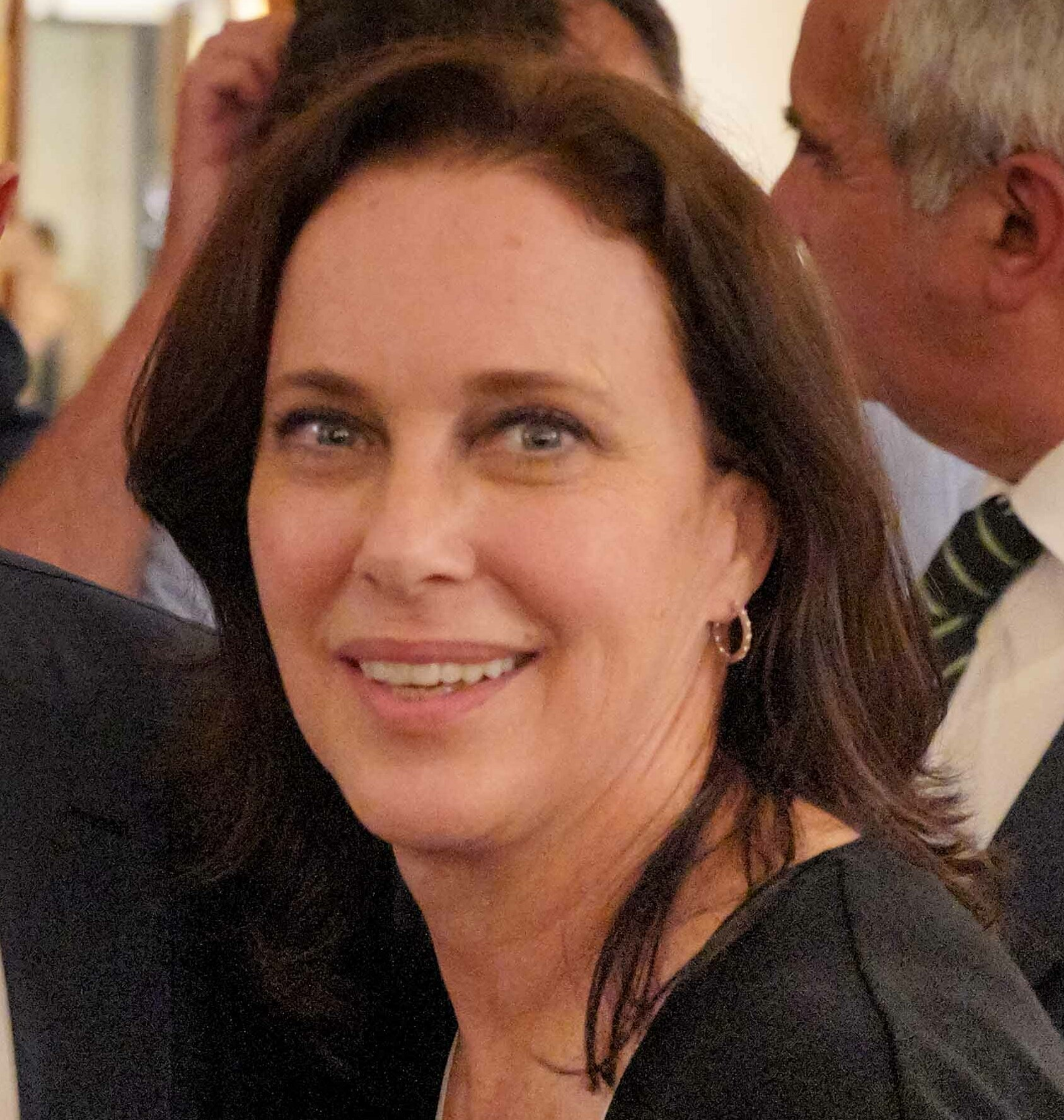
- Born: Clarissa Burt; 25 April 1959 (age 65); Philadelphia, USA
- Occupations: Actress; model; television personality
- Years active: 1977–present

Clarissa Burt (born 25 April 1959) is an Italian-American actress, television personality, and former model, best known for starring as Xayide in the 1990 film The NeverEnding Story II: The Next Chapter.

== Biography ==
Born in the United States, she worked as model in the 1980s and moved to Italy where she also starred in several Italian comedies. In 1999, she opened her television production company, Numen International, in Rome. She ran for the 2004 European Parliament election supported by right-wing party National Alliance, but was not elected; she also served as assessor to cultural policies in the municipality of Ardea from July 2004 to March 2005.

== Selected filmography ==
- Casa mia, casa mia... (1988)
- Caruso Pascoski, Son of a Pole (1988)
- The NeverEnding Story II: The Next Chapter (1990)
- Edera (1992)
- Vento di primavera - Innamorarsi a Monopoli (2000)
- Sotto il cielo (2001)
- Natale in India (2003)
- Wish Man (2019)

== Television ==
- 1996 Olympics (Correspondent, RAI UNO, Atlanta)
- Serata d'onore (Singer/Presenter)
- Ricomincio da due (Entertainer)
- Disney Christmas Special (Host)
- Una notte al circo (Acrobat, Aerialist)
- Un disco per l'estate (Presenter/Singer)
- La talpa (Contestant, 2010)
- L'isola dei famosi (Contestant, 2010)
