= Vacanze di Natale 2000 =

1999 film

- Directed by: Carlo Vanzina
- Written by: Carlo Vanzina; Enrico Vanzina
- Produced by: Aurelio De Laurentiis
- Starring: Massimo Boldi; Christian De Sica; Megan Gale; Enzo Salvi; Carmen Electra; Nino D'Angelo
- Edited by: Luca Montanari
- Music by: Manuel De Sica
- Distributed by: Filmauro
- Release date: 17 December 1999
- Running time: 110 minutes
- Country: Italy
- Language: Italian

Vacanze di Natale 2000 (Christmas Vacation 2000) is a 1999 Italian Christmas comedy film directed by Carlo Vanzina.

== Plot ==
The Covelli family from Rome will spend the Christmas holidays in Cortina d'Ampezzo, where lawyer Gianni Covelli has purchased a chalet for his wife to organize a big New Year's Eve party. The eccentric Colombo family from Monza, whose son Marco is engaged to the very spoiled Giada Covelli, will be staying with the Covellis. Meanwhile, the large Esposito family from Naples will also spend the holidays in Cortina because Pasquale Esposito recently won 70 billion lire in the lottery and treated the whole family to a vacation at the luxurious Bellevue hotel. Two broke students from Emilia, Paolo and Roberto, will also be working in a store during the holidays to earn some extra money. Paolo notices Morena, a young hairdresser, but she snubs him at first claiming to be the niece of the famous Countess Dal Pozzo, a well-known figure in Cortina. The Covellis are in a crisis as their trusted upholsterer is on vacation, but he suggests sending his nephew Oscar as a replacement in time for New Year's Eve.

Roberto meets supermodel Megan Gale while skiing, but she is shooting a commercial and he is rudely pushed away by the model's boyfriend Gianni. Meanwhile, Esmeralda, the Cuban lover of Ettore Colombo, arrives in Cortina. Ettore intercepts her and confesses that he is married, angering the girl who leaves the Covelli house. Paolo pretends to be wealthy to impress Morena by calling himself Barilla and passing off Roberto as Roberto Gazzoni, son of a well-known industrialist from Bologna. Morena decides to give Paolo a chance and sets up a double date with a friend. Pasquale Esposito meets Megan Gale in the sauna and invites her and his family to dinner for pizza. Oscar the upholsterer arrives at the Covellis' home, but soon proves to be inexperienced and clumsy. Paolo and Roberto go on a dinner date with Morena and her friend who pretends to be a marchioness, but during the dinner, they encounter the real Countess Dal Pozzo, who reveals the truth about the girls' identities. The following day, Morena sees Paolo and Roberto working in the clothing store and understands everything; feeling deceived, Morena decides to play along and makes Paolo spend every last penny.

Esmeralda meets Marco, the son of her former lover Ettore Colombo, and finds a job as a dancer in a nightclub. Megan discovers her boyfriend Gianni kissing another woman and runs away with Roberto, who offers her to stay in his room. She later reconciles with Gianni and decides to return to him. Countess Dal Pozzo befriends the Espositos pretending to be friendly, but her real intention is to sell them her villa in Costa Smeralda at a high price. Morena confronts Paolo, who eventually admits he is just a poor student, leading her to leave in frustration.

Patrizia Covelli wants to invite Megan as the guest of honor to the New Year's Eve party at their chalet, but while Covelli and Colombo are resolving an issue with flower arrangements that prevents the invitation from reaching the star, Oscar accidentally drills a water pipe, leaving the house without heating just a day before the party. Luckily, they all get invited to the retreat rented by the newly made billionaire Esposito.

At the party, the stories of the various characters intertwine, and after the midnight toast, everyone sleds down to the valley except the countess, publicly humiliated by Pasquale Esposito who saw through her deceit, Morena who realizes Paolo's genuine interest, and Megan who understands her boyfriend will continue to betray her. She and Roberto have sex. Marco, who was left by Giada that evening, will get engaged to Esmeralda and ask for a ticket to Cuba as a gift to visit her family.

== Cast ==
- Massimo Boldi as Ettore Colombo
- Christian De Sica as Giovanni Covelli
- Megan Gale as herself (voiced by Teresa Pascarelli)
- Enzo Salvi as Oscar "Er Cipolla"
- Carmen Electra as Esmeralda (voiced by Ilaria Latini)
- Monica Scattini as Patrizia Covelli
- Irene Ferri as Morena
- Virginie Marsan as Azzurra Covelli
- Francesca Romana Messere as Azzurra's friend
- Micaela Ramazzotti as Giada Covelli
- Andrea Castoldi as Marco Colombo
- Emanuela Grimalda as Countess Allegra dal Pozzo
- Giammarco Rocco Di Torrepadula as Roberto
- Luciana Ussi Alzati as Silvia Colombo
- Paolo Conticini as Gianni
- Andrea Lupo as Paolo Scottoni
- Ciro Esposito as Gaetano Esposito
- Ernesto Lama as Salvatore De Rosa
- Adriano Pantaleo as Gennaro "Gennarino" Esposito
- Nunzia Schiano as Giuseppina Esposito
- Nino D'Angelo as Pasquale Esposito
