= Grandi magazzini =

- Directed by: Castellano & Pipolo
- Written by: Castellano & Pipolo
- Produced by: Mario & Vittorio Cecchi Gori
- Starring: Enrico Montesano; Michele Placido; Massimo Ciavarro; Renato Pozzetto; Christian De Sica; Massimo Boldi; Lino Banfi; Alessandro Haber; Laura Antonelli; Heather Parisi; Nino Manfredi; Paolo Villaggio; Paolo Panelli; Ornella Muti
- Cinematography: Sebastiano Celeste
- Edited by: Antonio Siciliano
- Music by: Detto Mariano
- Production companies: Alexandra Film; C. G. Silver Film
- Distributed by: Columbia Pictures Italia
- Release date: October 31, 1986 (Italy)
- Running time: 110 minutes
- Country: Italy
- Language: Italian

Grandi magazzini (lit. 'Department Store') is a 1986 Italian anthology comedy film directed by Castellano & Pipolo.

== Plot summary ==
Various characters and stories intertwine inside the Grandi Magazzini store.

Evaristo Mazzetti is a cleaner at the department store. As a favour to his friend De Rossi, he agrees to replace him as a clerk in the sanitary department, not knowing that the man owes 30 million Italian lira to a loan shark named Puccio and that De Rossi is actually the son of the engineer Gruber, owner of the G.M. During the day, Evaristo is visited several times by the debt collector sent by Puccio to collect the debt: at each appearance, he causes several bone fractures. As chance would have it, Helena, wife of Dr Umberto Anzellotti, head of personnel, has discovered that Gruber's son is working under a false name as a clerk in the sanitary department. Having revealed this to her husband, the woman leads him to believe that this son is Mazzetti himself; so between an invitation to lunch and an attempt at seduction by the woman, a meeting with Evaristo's father is arranged. The surprise arrival of the engineer Gruber leads to other misunderstandings that cause Evaristo's dismissal, until he is reinstated by De Rossi himself, who in the meantime has paid off his gambling debt.

The manager of the G.M., despotic and always and only focused on his work, after having treated his secretary, Miss Romano, coldly all day long, mends his ways at the end of the day by inviting her first to dinner and then to his house.

Corrado Minozzi is a security guard at the department store. Called to order by the manager for negligence, he promises not to let more than one thief get away, but in the course of the day he first has a bicycle stolen from under his eyes by a shoplifter, then a radio, a woman's dress and finally lets a couple get away who never buy anything but steal the trolleys.

Fausto Valsecchi is a home delivery man at a department store. During the day, harassed by the shipping manager, he finds himself involved in various situations: a doorman won't let him use the lift to transport a television set, a Great Dane ends up attacking him, an inconsolable widow wants to keep him for lunch and a quarrelsome couple involve him in an argument. At the end of the day he accepts the offer of a homosexual engineer, to whom he has made his last delivery, to take the place of his partner Mimì who has abandoned him, taking revenge on his shipping manager.

Nicola Abatecola is a beggar with a false leg who, together with his daughter Assunta, works as a street musician at the entrance to the department store. Despite his situation, Nicola does not feel sorry for himself, but rather smiles at life, selling what he defines as a rare commodity, cheerfulness, to the customers of the department store, and he even manages to obtain a generous donation from the manager.

Marco Salviati is an actor on his twilight years, an alcoholic and in financial difficulty. He accepts his agent Simoni's offer to shoot a commercial for the department store for a million lire salary. During filming, Salviati continually tries to drink alcohol on the sly, until he gets drunk on champagne in the meeting room. Brought back to the set by production secretary Bonanni, he angers the director by constantly changing his lines. In order to save his friend's face, Simoni obtains to let him shoot the commercial without film, promising the director to find a free substitute; Salviati this time plays the commercial perfectly, but when he is asked to shoot another one for safety he refuses, then making the noble gesture of offering champagne to the crew with his pay.

Antonio Borazzi is a lout from Cantalupo in Sabina, the lucky winner of a shopping voucher to spend at the G.M., to the tune of 500,000 Italian lira. He entrusts his choice of goods to Miss Carla Marchi and after spending the whole day in the supermarkets, unable to find any goods to spend the precise amount he has won, he finally opts for a night with the attractive saleswoman.

Turati and Nardini are two prisoners convicted of fraud who, having just been released from prison, try to pull off a scam against the GMs, passing off one of them as a German-made humanoid robot that they would like to sell to the purchasing manager, Dr. Tucci. Tucci, however, decides to have the article examined by an expert in marketing for children, his son Carletto, who subjects Turati to a series of painful tests.

Roberto, a G.M. salesman, is madly in love with Ornella Muti, to whom he writes every day. Surprisingly, the actress herself appears at the G.M.'s to meet him and to convince him that the right woman for him is his ex-girlfriend Luisa. Shortly afterwards, Roberto realises he has been dreaming, but decides to follow Muti's advice anyway and returns with Luisa, who happens to look exactly like the well-known actress.

A very short-sighted customer loses her contact lenses and gets lost in the G.M.; after a thousand vicissitudes she finally believes she has made it home, but in reality the bedroom she is in is in the furniture department.

There are also other stories and sketches. A voyeur pays a boilermaker to see up the skirts of customers entering the shop through a grille, even making him raise his skirt like Marilyn Monroe in the movie The Seven Year Itch. A mannequin dresser mistakes a real woman for a mannequin and leaves her shirtless. A saleswoman in the cosmetics department tries on lipstick on her hand to show it to a customer, who leaves without buying anything. In the end it turns out that the saleswoman tested the lipsticks on an artificial hand.

A customer tries out a Japanese voice-controlled car and ends up telling her off for talking too much. The car responds in kind. A customer interviewed for an advertisement for Push detergent complains that her white blouse was blue before she washed it. A customer with stings on his face asks for an insecticide against wasps and a salesman shows him one that makes a scooter of the same name crash to the ground. A black customer asks the reception desk where the 'white fair' is (the post-Christmas sales on underwear, a great classic of the period). A lady takes a packet of condoms, saying that this will enable her daughter's boyfriend to give her a proof of love. The daughter, very ugly, turns around and tells her mother that she doesn't have a boyfriend.

In the integral version there is also a parody of the Motta Tartufone commercial, widely broadcast in those years, this time using the precious vegetable; again in the integral version, a shop assistant tests the functioning of some products, among which a hair dryer and a dildo. A customer wants to buy a reversed sheepskin jacket and the salesman presents him with a live sheep. In the uncut version of the film other customers ask for similar clothes and the salesman shows them all the same sheep. When a customer asks for a sheep, he says he doesn't have any more.

== Cast ==
- Enrico Montesano: Evaristo Mazzetti
- Renato Pozzetto: Fausto Valsecchi
- Paolo Villaggio: Turati / Robot
- Massimo Boldi: Corrado Minozzi
- Lino Banfi: Nicola Abatecola da Cerignola
- Nino Manfredi: Marco Salviati
- Laura Antonelli: Helèna Anzellotti
- Michele Placido: Director
- Christian De Sica: Antonio Borazzi
- Heather Parisi: Dolly
- Ornella Muti: Herself / Luisa
- Alessandro Haber: Umberto Anzellotti
- Massimo Ciavarro: De Rossi
- Gigi Reder: Detenuto Nardini / Dr. Kauffman
- Simonetta Stefanelli: Mrs. Marisa Romano
- Gianni Bonagura: Ingegner Gruber
- Paolo Panelli: father of Evaristo
- Victor Cavallo: Mr. Carotti
- Leo Gullotta: Simoni
- Franco Fabrizi: Ingegner Zambuti
- Ugo Bologna: Dr. Tucci
- Claudio Botosso: Roberto
- Mattia Sbragia: Dottor Baldini
- Teo Teocoli: Armando Venturini
- Antonella Vitale: Carla Marchi
- Peppe Lanzetta: Giuseppe
- Iaia Forte: wife of Giuseppe
- Francesca Dellera (credited as Francesca Cervellera): Donna in rosso
- Eva Grimaldi: Donna in giallo
- Riccardo Rossi: Giovanni
- Sabrina Salerno: Ladra di abiti

== Release and reception ==
Grandi magazzini was released in Italy on October 31, 1986 in Rome, Catania, Florence, Genoa, Naples and Ancona.

The film was one of the most popular Italian films for the year with over 1.9 million admissions.

== See also ==
- List of Italian films of 1986
