= Three Tigers Against Three Tigers =

- Directed by: Sergio Corbucci; Steno
- Written by: Mario Amendola; Castellano & Pipolo; Sergio Corbucci; Mino Guerrini; Cochi Ponzoni; Renato Pozzetto; Enrico Vanzina
- Produced by: Renato Infascelli; Fulvio Lucisano
- Starring: Renato Pozzetto; Enrico Montesano; Paolo Villaggio
- Cinematography: Marcello Gatti; Emilio Loffredo
- Edited by: Amedeo Salfa
- Music by: Guido & Maurizio De Angelis
- Release date: 1977
- Running time: 115 minutes
- Language: Italian

Three Tigers Against Three Tigers (Italian: Tre tigri contro tre tigri) is a 1977 comedy film directed by Sergio Corbucci and Steno. It consists of three segments.

== Cast ==
First Segment

  - Renato Pozzetto as Don Cimbolano
  - Cochi Ponzoni as Father Joe Martini
  - Corinne Cléry as The Nanny
  - Kirsten Gille as Diana
  - Massimo Boldi as Romeo
  - Ugo Bologna as Major Borsetti
  - Ester Carloni as Don Cimbolano's Maid
  - Gabriella Giorgelli as The Bartender

Second Segment

  - Enrico Montesano as Oscar Bertoletti
  - Dalila Di Lazzaro as Countess Lucrezia Marini
  - Giuseppe Anatrelli as Count Rodolfo Peppino Marini di Lampedusa
  - Nanni Loy as himself
  - Piero Gerlini as The Commissioner
  - Franco Giacobini as Luigino
  - Gabriella Giorgelli as The Maid

Third Segment

  - Paolo Villaggio as Lawyer Scorza
  - Anna Mazzamauro as Giada Nardi
  - Daniele Vargas as Lawyer Berchielli
  - Renzo Marignano as Lorenzo, marito di Giada
  - Dino Emanuelli as Lawyer Dal Pino
  - Ferruccio Amendola as Control Tower Officer

== See also ==
- List of Italian films of 1977
