= Nebbia in Val Padana =

- Directed by: Felice Farina
- Country of origin: Italy

Original release
- Network: Rai 1
- Release: January 9 – February 13, 2000

Nebbia in Val Padana is an Italian television series.

== Cast ==
- Renato Pozzetto: Renato
- Cochi Ponzoni: Cochi
- Lia Tanzi: Elena
- Gisella Sofio: The Countess
- Valeria Morosini: Monica

== See also ==
- List of Italian television series
