= I'm Photogenic =

1980 Italian comedy film by Dino Risi

- Italian theatrical release poster by Enzo Sciotti
- Directed by: Dino Risi
- Written by: Dino Risi; Massimo Franciosa; Marco Risi
- Produced by: Pio Angeletti; Adriano De Micheli
- Starring: Renato Pozzetto; Edwige Fenech
- Cinematography: Tonino Delli Colli
- Edited by: Alberto Gallitti
- Music by: Manuel De Sica
- Release date: 1980
- Running time: 117 minutes
- Country: Italy
- Language: Italian

I'm Photogenic (Italian: Sono fotogenico) is a 1980 Italian comedy film directed by Dino Risi. It was screened out of competition at the 1980 Cannes Film Festival.

== Plot ==
Italy, early 1980s. Antonio Barozzi (Renato Pozzetto), an aspiring actor, goes to the film studios in Rome, where he seeks both fame and fortune.

== Cast ==
- Renato Pozzetto as Antonio Barozzi
- Edwige Fenech as Cinzia Pancaldi
- Aldo Maccione as Pedretti - Lawyer
- Julien Guiomar as Carlo Simoni
- Michel Galabru as Del Giudice - Producer
- Gino Santercole as Sergio
- Massimo Boldi as Sandro Rubizzi
- Attilio Dottesio as Attilio Turchese
