= Due cuori, una cappella =

- Italian theatrical release poster by Renato Casaro
- Directed by: Maurizio Lucidi
- Written by: Maurizio Lucidi; Renato Pozzetto; Nicola Badalucco
- Produced by: Piero La Mantia
- Starring: Renato Pozzetto; Agostina Belli
- Cinematography: Aldo Tonti
- Edited by: Renzo Lucidi
- Music by: Stelvio Cipriani
- Release date: 1975
- Running time: 105 min
- Country: Italy
- Language: Italian

Due cuori, una cappella is a 1975 Italian comedy film directed by Maurizio Lucidi.

== Plot ==
Aristide receives a rich inheritance of jewelry from his died mother, but when he meets a beautiful redhead at the cemetery, his life changes unexpectedly.

== Cast ==
- Renato Pozzetto: Aristide
- Agostina Belli: Claudia
- Aldo Maccione: Victor
- Giusi Raspani Dandolo: mother of Aristide
- Leopoldo Trieste: custode del cimitero
- Massimo Boldi: prete
- Gianni Baghino: Tonino
- Pia Morra: Speranza
- Alvaro Vitali: tassista
- Mario Brega: macellaio
- Ursula Andress: herself
