= Renato Pozzetto =

Italian actor (born 1940)

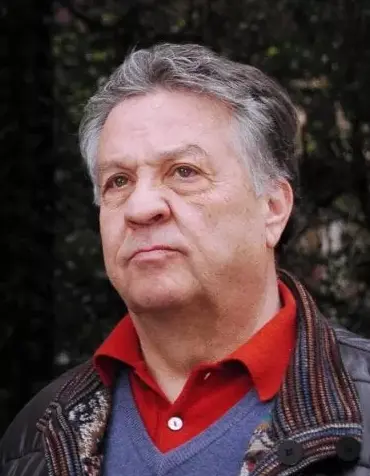
- Pozzetto in 2020
- Born: 14 July 1940 (age 85); Laveno Mombello, province of Varese, Kingdom of Italy
- Occupations: Director; comedian; singer
- Years active: 1964–present
- Spouse: Brunella Gubler (m. 1967; died 2009)
- Children: 2
- Parent(s): Armando (father), Clementina (mother)

Renato Pozzetto (born 14 July 1940) is an Italian actor, director, comedian, and singer.

== Biography ==
Pozzetto was born into a working-class family from Milan and grew up in the comune (municipality) of Gemonio, in the province of Varese. After graduation, he made his debut as a comedian at the Derby Club in Milan. In 1964, he and his childhood friend Cochi Ponzoni formed the duo Cochi e Renato. They recorded several successful songs, often written in collaboration with Enzo Jannacci. These songs often had a satirical and/or nonsense take. Their most popular hits include "La canzone intelligente" ("The intelligent song", a satire about songwriting) and "E la vita, la vita". From the mid-1970s through the first half of the 1990s, Pozzetto enjoyed a prolific career in film, where he became famous for his trademark pronounced Milanese accent and for his shy and stuttering way of speaking. In the mid-2000s, following almost two decades of separation, he reunited with Ponzoni.

== Filmography ==
=== Actor ===
- Per amare Ofelia (1974) – Orlando Aliverti Mannetti
- La poliziotta (1974) - Claudio Ravassi
- A mezzanotte va la ronda del piacere (1975) – Fulvio
- Paolo Barca, maestro elementare, praticamente nudista (1975) – Paolo Barca
- Due cuori, una cappella (1975) – Aristide Cacciamani
- Babysitter - Un maledetto pasticcio (1975) – Gianni, Michélle's friend
- Di che segno sei? (1975) – Basilio
- The Career of a Chambermaid (1975) – Tenente Bruno (uncredited)
- Il padrone e l'operaio (1975) – Gianluca Tosi
- Un sorriso, uno schiaffo, un bacio in bocca (1975) – Himself
- Oh, Serafina! (1976) – Augusto Valle
- Sturmtruppen (1976) – Una recluta
- Luna di miele in tre (1976) – Alfredo Riva
- Tre tigri contro tre tigri (1977) – Don Cimbolano
- Ecco noi per esempio... (1977) – Palmambrogio Guanziroli
- Black Journal (1977) – Stella Kraus
- Io tigro, tu tigri, egli tigra (1978) – Elia
- Saxofone (1978) – Sax
- Per vivere meglio divertitevi con noi (1978) – Siro Sante (segment "Non si può spiegare, bisogna vederlo")
- Neapolitan Mystery (1979) – Inspector Voghera
- La patata bollente (1979) – Bernardo Mambelli, detto 'Il Gandhi'
- Agenzia Riccardo Finzi... praticamente detective (1979) – Riccardo Finzi
- Tesoro mio (1979) – Uff. Giudiziario Pierluigi
- I'm Photogenic (1980) – Antonio Barozzi
- Zucchero, miele e peperoncino (1980) – Plinio Carlozzi
- Fico d'India (1980) – Lorenzo Millozzi
- Mia moglie è una strega (1980) – Emilio Altieri
- Uno contro l'altro, praticamente amici (1981) – Franco Colombo
- Nessuno è perfetto (1981) – Guerrino Castiglione
- Culo e camicia (1981) – Renato
- Ricchi, ricchissimi... praticamente in mutande (1982) – Berto Del Prà
- Porca vacca (1982) – Primo Baffo detto Barbasini
- Testa o croce (1982) – Don Emidio / Father Remigio
- La casa stregata (1982) – Giorgio
- Questo e quello (1983) – Giulio (segment "Questo... amore impossibile") / Gregory (segment "Quello... col basco rosso")
- Un povero ricco (1983) – Eugenio Ronconi / Eugenio Ragona
- Mani di fata (1983) – Andrea Ferrini
- Il ragazzo di campagna (1984) – Artemio
- Lui è peggio di me (1985) – Luciano
- È arrivato mio fratello (1985) – Ovidio Ceciotti / Raf Benson
- Grandi magazzini (1986) – Fausto Valsecchi
- 7 chili in 7 giorni (1986) – Silvano Baracchi
- Noi uomini duri (1987) – Silvio
- Roba da ricchi (1987) – Don Vittorino
- Da grande (1987) – Marco
- Il volatore di aquiloni (1987) – Urca
- Casa mia, casa mia... (1988) – Mario Bartoloni
- Burro (1989) – Burro
- Le comiche (1990) – Renato
- Non più di uno (1990) – Piero
- Piedipiatti (1991) – Brigadiere Silvio Camurati
- Le comiche 2 (1991) – Renato
- Infelici e contenti (1992) – Aldo
- Ricky & Barabba (1992) – Ricky Morandi
- Anche i commercialisti hanno un'anima (1994) – Carlo Malinverni
- Le nuove comiche (1994) – Renato
- Miracolo italiano (1994) – Fermo Pulciani
- Mollo tutto (1995) – Franco Giacobetti
- Papà dice messa (1996) – Don Arturo
- Nebbia in Val Padana (2000, TV Series)
- Un amore su misura (2007) – Corrado Olmi
- Oggi sposi (2009) – Renato Di Caio
- What a Beautiful Surprise (2015) – Giovanni
- We Still Talk (2021) – Giuseppe 'Nino' Sgarbi (final film role)

=== Director ===
- Io tigro, tu tigri, egli tigra (1978)
- Saxofone (1978)
- Il volatore di aquiloni (1987)
- Papà dice messa (1996)
- Un amore su misura (2007)
