= Fausto Brizzi =

Italian screenwriter, producer and film director

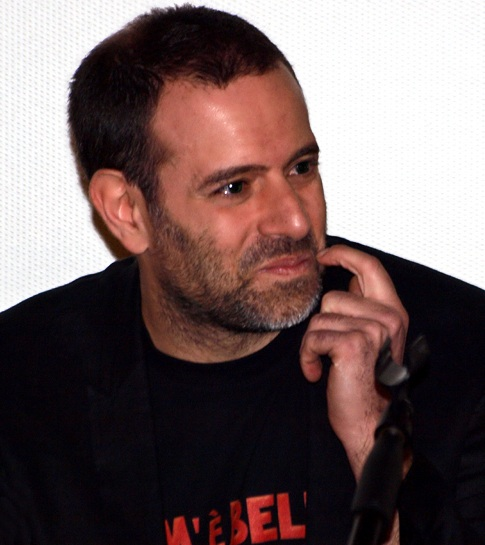
- Fausto Brizzi in 2012
- Born: 15 November 1968 (age 58); Rome, Italy
- Occupation: film director
- Years active: 1997–present
- Height: 1.80 m (5 ft 11 in)
- Spouses: Claudia Zanella (m. 2014; div. 2019) Silvia Salis (m. 2020)

Fausto Brizzi (born 15 November 1968, in Rome) is an Italian screenwriter, producer and film director.

== Biography ==
Fausto Brizzi got a Degree in directing at the "Centro Sperimentale di Cinematografia" in July 1994. After several theatrical experience and some rewarded shorts, from 1994 he dedicated in writing television and film plots.

He wrote for numerous TV fictions (among others: Il mio amico Babbo Natale (My friend Santa Claus), with Lino Banfi and Gerry Scotti, Valeria medico legale with Claudia Koll, Non ho l'età, with Marco Columbro, Sei forte maestro, with Emilio Solfrizzi, Onora il padre with Leo Gullotta; Lui e lei with Vittoria Belvedere, Benedetti dal Signore, with Ezio Greggio and Enzo Iacchetti, Due imbroglioni e mezzo (Two cheaters and a half), with Claudio Bisio and Sabrina Ferilli.

He also wrote a dozen of films with great success (among others:Bodyguards, Merry Christmas, Natale sul Nilo, Natale in India, Christmas in love, Natale a Miami, Natale a New York e Natale in crociera, all directed by Neri Parenti).

Notte prima degli esami (The Night Before The Exams), his debut as director, was rewarded at about fifty Italian and international film festivals. Among the prizes the most important David di Donatello, the Ciak d'oro, the Telegatto, the Sky Award and the award of public at the Festival of Annecy. The film was the Italian phenomenon of 2006, collecting more than 15 million Euro and creating a series of side initiatives including a successful novel, an academic journal, a Disney cartoon (written by Brizzi with Riccardo Secchi), a musical directed by Saverio Marconi and a "new-quel", a transposition in modern times titled Notte prima degli esami – Oggi (The Night Before the Exams: Today), a film that has exceeded the success of the first (among the record established that the Italian film with the largest collection in the first day of programming, about one million euros). A novel of great success was taken from this film. In January 2008 he won his second Telegatto as "Best Film of the Year".

In the summer of 2008 a remake of "The Night Before The Exams" was published with Michel Blanc in the role of Professor Martineau (in the Italian version "Martinelli", that was interpreted by Giorgio Faletti).

In December 2008, during the Professional Film Days in Sorrento, he was awarded the "Golden Ticket" (the 9th consecutive) for the screenplay of Natale in crociera (The Christmas Cruise).

In 2008 he wrote the film Amici miei 400 directed by Neri Parenti, Oggi sposi directed by Luca Lucini and a new work to Marco Martani, The thriller La notte di Peter Pan (The night of Peter Pan).

His third project as director, the ensemble comedy Many Kisses Later, dedicated to the finished love, was released on 6 February 2009. Among the cast: Silvio Orlando, Claudia Gerini, Claudio Bisio, Flavio Insinna, Cristiana Capotondi, Gianmarco Tognazzi, Elena Sofia Ricci, Fabio De Luigi, Nancy Brilli, Alessandro Gassman, Claudia Gerini, Cécile Cassel, Malik Zidi, Vincenzo Salemme and Giorgia Wurth.

In November 2017, he was accused of sexual harassment. The charges were dropped in January 2019.

== Director ==
=== Cinema ===
- Notte prima degli esami (2006)
- Notte prima degli esami – Oggi (2007)
- Many Kisses Later (2009)
- Men vs. Women (2010)
- Women vs. Men (2011)
- Love Is in the Air (2012)
- Pazze di me (2013)
- Guess Who's Coming for Christmas? (2013)
- Forever Young (2016)
- Poveri ma ricchi (2016)
- Poveri ma ricchissimi (2017)
- Modalità aereo (2019)
- Se mi vuoi bene (2019)
- La mia banda suona il pop (2020)
- Bla Bla Baby (2022)
- Da grandi (2023)
- Where Storks Dare (2025)
- Quasi vera (2026)

=== Screenwriter ===
- Lui e lei (1998)
- Tutti gli uomini sono uguali (1998)
- Lezione di guai (1999)
- Baldini e Simoni (1999)
- Tifosi (1999)
- Sei forte, Maestro (2000)
- Valeria medico legale (2000)
- Bodyguards - Guardie del corpo (2000)
- Non ho l'età (2001)
- Merry Christmas (2001)
- Onora il padre (2001)
- Benedetti dal Signore (2002)
- Non ho l'età 2 (2002)
- Natale sul Nilo (2002)
- Natale in India (2003)
- O la va, o la spacca (2004)
- Christmas in Love (2004)
- The Clan (2005)
- Natale a Miami (2005)
- Il mio amico Babbo Natale (2005)
- Natale a New York (2006)
- Notte prima degli esami (2006)
- Il mio amico Babbo Natale 2 (2006)
- Notte prima degli esami – Oggi (2007)
- Due imbroglioni e... mezzo! (2007)
- Concrete Romance (2007)
- Natale in crociera (2007)
- This Night Is Still Ours (2008)
- Many Kisses Later (2009)
- La valle delle ombre (2009)
- Oggi sposi (2009)
- Agata e Ulisse (2010)
- Men vs. Women (2010)
- Love Is in the Air (2012)
- Guess Who's Coming for Christmas? (2013)
- Forever Young (2016)

=== Videoclip ===
- Vuoto a perdere of Noemi
