= Neri Parenti =

Italian film director and writer (born 1950)

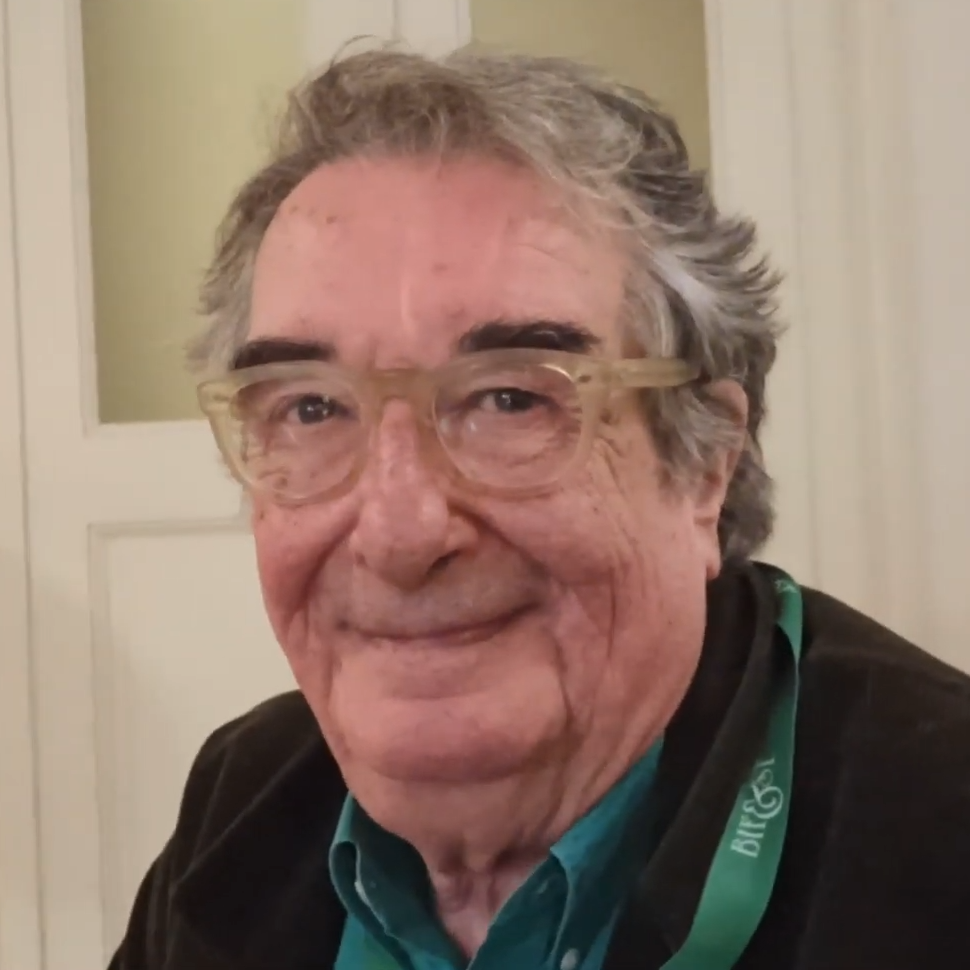
- Born: 26 April 1950 (age 76); Florence, Italy
- Occupation: Film director
- Years active: 1979–present
- Height: 1.85 m (6 ft 1 in)

Neri Parenti (born 26 April 1950) is an Italian film director and writer. He is known for comedy films, including the series starring Paolo Villaggio playing the character Ugo Fantozzi, and a later series of cinepanettoni—zany comedy films scheduled for release during the Christmas period.

== Biography ==
After graduating in political science, he dedicated his career to filmmaking. He became a pupil and assistant of Pasquale Festa Campanile from 1972 to 1979, and also worked for Salvatore Samperi, Steno and Giorgio Capitani. In 1979 he directed his first film, The Face with Two Left Feet, an ironic and comical parody of Saturday Night Fever with John Travolta, which had been a hit two years earlier.

A year later, he met the film actor and director Paolo Villaggio, who was then filming Fantozzi contro tutti. Villaggio developed an esteem for Parenti and decided to leave the director's chair to join forces with him. The result was very positive, and the pair made another six films with the Fantozzi character, from Fantozzi subisce ancora (1983) to Fantozzi - Il ritorno (1996).

His films feature catastrophic and noisy gags, referring back to American silent film, combined with typical situations from Italian comedy (commedia brillante) and with some authorial motifs, repeated in almost all his films, from the diptych Scuola di ladri (1986) and Scuola di ladri - Parte seconda (1987), to the famous trilogy Le comiche (1990), Le comiche 2 (1992), and Le nuove comiche (1994). His film Le comiche was the fourth-highest-grossing film in Italy in 1990. Parenti claimed in 2012 that he had been excommunicated twice for sequences in Le comiche and Le comiche 2 that he said had been considered outrageous by the Catholic Church. The spokesman of the Holy See, Federico Lombardi, and Cardinal Velasio De Paolis, who from 2003 to 2008 was secretary of the Apostolic Signatura, both promptly denied the report, saying that the director was only joking. Anyway, the director considers himself atheist.

After the expiry of his contract with Villaggio in 1996, Parenti turned to directing Christmas movies, or cinepanettoni, starring Christian De Sica and Massimo Boldi. Parenti had already experimented in this kind of movie when he was still working with Villaggio; the first such film he directed was Vacanze di Natale '95 (1995). Further films he made set at Christmas time started with Merry Christmas (2001), and ended with Vacanze di Natale a Cortina (2011), which registered the third highest takings in Italy that year.

In 2020, he directed comedy couple Christian De Sica and Massimo Boldi in In vacanza su Marte, after a 15-year hiatus.

He is one of the few Italian directors to have stayed within a single genre throughout his career.

== Filmography ==
- The Face with Two Left Feet (1979)
- Fantozzi contro tutti (1980)
- Fracchia la belva umana (1981)
- Sogni mostruosamente proibiti (1982)
- Pappa e ciccia (1983)
- Fantozzi subisce ancora (1983)
- I pompieri (1985)
- Fracchia contro Dracula (1985)
- Scuola di ladri (1986)
- Superfantozzi (1986)
- Scuola di ladri - Parte seconda (1987)
- Casa mia, casa mia... (1988)
- Fantozzi va in pensione (1988)
- Fratelli d'Italia (1989)
- I Won the New Year's Lottery (1989)
- Le comiche (1990)
- Fantozzi alla riscossa (1990)
- Le comiche 2 (1991)
- Infelici e contenti (1992)
- Fantozzi in paradiso (1993)
- Le nuove comiche (1994)
- Vacanze di Natale '95 (1995)
- Fantozzi – Il ritorno (1996)
- Cucciolo (1998)
- Paparazzi (1998)
- Tifosi (1999)
- Body Guards (2000)
- Merry Christmas (2001)
- Natale sul Nilo (2002)
- Natale in India (2003)
- Christmas in Love (2004)
- Natale a Miami (2005)
- Natale a New York (2006)
- Natale in crociera (2007)
- Natale a Rio (2008)
- Natale a Beverly Hills (2009)
- Natale in Sudafrica (2010)
- Amici miei – Come tutto ebbe inizio (2011)
- Vacanze di Natale a Cortina (2011)
- Lightning Strike (2012)
- Colpi di fortuna (2013)
- What's Your Sign? (2014)
- Vacanze ai Caraibi (2015)
- Natale da chef (2017)
- In vacanza su Marte (2020)
- Volevo un figlio maschio (2023)

== Bibliography ==
- Frini, Roberto (2005). Neri Parenti (in Italian). Rome: Gremese Editore. ISBN 88-8440-352-9.
- Brunetta, Gian Piero (2009). The History of Italian Cinema: A Guide to Italian Film from Its Origins to the Twenty-first Century. Princeton, NJ: Princeton University Press. ISBN 978-0-691-11988-5.
