= Sonia Viviani =

Italian actress and glamour model

- Born: 4 January 1958 (age 68); Rome, Italy
- Occupation: Actress
- Years active: 1974 - 1994

Sonia Viviani is a retired Italian actress and glamour model who is foremost known for her appearances in the Italian exploitation cinema and two films of acclaim in Turkey in the 1970s.

== Film career ==
Viviani met with cinema at an early age due to her father's work at Cinecittà and started her career in Pasquale Squitieri's Blood Brothers (1974). She met Tony Askin who became her agent and a plethora of roles followed. Her first role worthy of mention was in Un urlo dalle tenebre a.k.a. The Return of Exorcist by Franco lo Cascio in 1975. However, her first lead roles came with two Osman F. Seden films: Teşekkür Ederim Büyükanne (1975), an adaptation of Marino Girolami film Lover Boy and Delicesine (1976), an adaptation of Irving Wallace novel The Fan Club that featured Viviani with Kadir İnanır and Fikret Hakan, two prominent Turkish actors.

Her later films from mid-1970s to 1980s covered many exploitation genres ranging from commedia sexy all'italiana (L'adolescente (1976) by Alfonso Brescia), nazisploitation (KZ9 - Lager di Sterminio (1977) by Bruno Mattei), and zombie film (Nightmare City (1980) by Umberto Lenzi) to giallo (The Scorpion with Two Tails (1983) by Sergio Martino) and peplum (The Adventures of Hercules (1985) by Luigi Cozzi). She ended her career in 1994 with Le nuove comiche by Neri Parenti.

== Glamour model ==
In the 1980s, Viviani appeared on covers and in pictorials of various men's magazines including the French edition of Playboy and the Italian edition of Penthouse, particularly due to her ostensible similarity to Princess Caroline of Monaco.
