= Massimo Boldi =

Italian stand-up comedian and actor

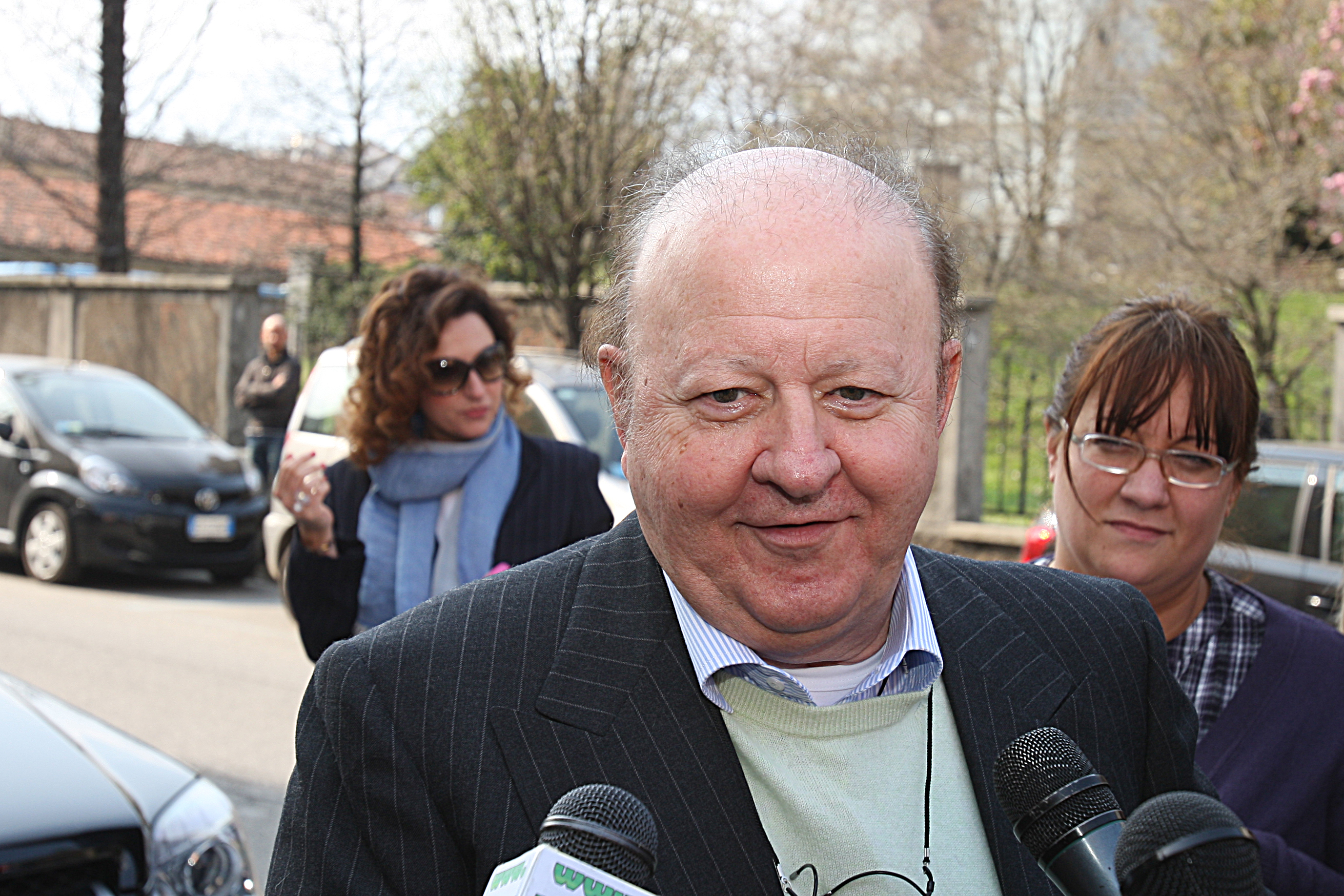
- Boldi in 2017
- Born: 23 July 1945 (age 81); Luino, Kingdom of Italy
- Occupations: Stand-up comedian; actor
- Spouse: Marisa Selo (1973 – 30 April 2004) (her death)
- Partner: Irene Fornaciari (2019–2020)
- Children: 3

Massimo Antonio Boldi (born 23 July 1945) is an Italian stand-up comedian and actor.

== Biography ==
Boldi was born in Luino on 23 July 1945. In 1955 his family moved to Milan, where he joined evening classes and began working as a window-dresser and then as a door-to-door salesman for a pastry company. In 1968 he started performing in cabaret. In the 1970s he did not perform, but managed a bar-latteria in Milan. On 29 September 1973 he married Marisa Selo (cousin of Formula One driver Michele Alboreto). Their marriage lasted until Selo's death on 8 April 2004.

== Artistic careers ==
=== Drummer ===
Boldi entered show business as a drummer. He played in the group I Mimitoki before joining the better-known La pattuglia azzurra ("The Blue Patrol"), which was headed by a young Claudio Lippi. He went on to be a drummer in Gino Paoli's orchestra and many other bands.

=== Stand-up comedian ===
Boldi continued his drumming career at Derby Club, established in 1959 as a jazz venue by Gianni Bongiovanni and his wife Angela. Among the artists he worked with were Enzo Jannacci, Cochi e Renato, Giorgio Gaber, Bruno Lauzi, Umberto Bindi, Gino Paoli, Paolo Villaggio, Walter Waldi and Enrico Intra, joint founder of the club. There, at the suggestion of Bongiovanni, he became a stand-up comedian, creating characters that soon became popular in the club and, after appearances on local television, outside. In those years he and Teo Teocoli performed as a duo, both in the Derby Club and on television.

=== Television career ===
On Antenna 3, a local television station in Legnano, Boldi and Teocoli performed "Non lo sapessi ma lo so" ("I didn't know, but I know now"), a program that was claimed to show the way for a new generation of comedians. Directed by Beppe Recchia, it was broadcast every Wednesday evening from 20:30 to midnight. The title came from a Boldi catch phrase that appeared in a song he wrote with his friends Enzo Jannacci and Paolo Beldì.

An ad-lib by Teocoli gave rise to Boldi's most famous and popular character, Massima Cipollino, the improbable, blundering presenter of a private newscast, in which he would take calls from the program director on a telephone on his desk, replying on air "Vvvvvvv....vvvaaaaaa Beneeeeeee!!!!!" ("Oooooo Kaaaaaay!!!!!"). He would then break the telephone while hanging up. After this, Boldi appeared in many programs on Italian national television, not always with Teocoli.

On the Rai Uno program Canzonissima, Boldi played one of his most successful characters, "Mario Vigorone", before moving on to the program A Tutto Gag, directed by Romolo Siena, in which Boldi played a Tuscan cook with the catch phrase "Come dite voi a Milano?" ("How do you say in Milan?"). On the RAI he also made Saltimbanchi si muore, La Tappazzeria, and Fantastico 8, programs made under the management of Adriano Celentano. On Mediaset, he took part in Drive In, Risatissima, Grand Hotel, Sabato al circo, La strana coppia.

In Una rotonda sul mare, Boldi and Teocoli played a parody of the Diabolik stories. Boldi was the seemingly mad thief "Diaboldik", and Teocoli played a certain "Inspector Rinko", a clear reference to Inspector Ginko, the thief in the black leotard.

On Canale 5 Boldi took part in a season of Striscia la notizia (1996–1997), Scherzi a parte (2002) and – in 2008 with Lorella Cuccarini – an edition of La sai l'ultima?. Canale 5 also gave Boldi his first fictional television role, as Lorenzo Fumagalli ("big dad") in the series Un ciclone in famiglia, directed by Carlo Vanzina.

== Cinema career ==
After some supporting roles in the late 1970s and early 1980s, Boldi had his first major success in Carlo Verdone's 1984 film I due carabinieri ("The two carabinieri"), and then with Scuola di ladri ("School for thieves") and Yuppies.

In film, Boldi plays the typical Milan citizen, bourgeois and methodical, always prone to tachycardia. Some of his favourite expressions, such as "Bestia che dolore!" ("Damn that pain!"), "Mi hai fatto un male pazzesco!" ("You have really hurt me!"), "Ciao Cipollino!" ("Hi Cipollino!"), "Vavavavavava!" ("Gogogogogo!") and "Non lo sapessi ma lo seppi!" ("I didn't know it but I knew it!"), have become popular catchphrases.

== Boldi and De Sica ==
Boldi has co-starred with Christian De Sica in movies for about twenty years. Together they have made 24 movies, beginning with traditional Christmas ones including Vacanze di Natale, A spasso nel tempo (1996), Paparazzi (1998), Tifosi ("Fans") (1999) and Christmas in Love (2004). By 2002, their films had grossed 300 billion lire ($150 million). Since separating from De Sica, Boldi has played in Olé (2006), Matrimonio alle Bahamas (2007) and La fidanzata di papà ("Dad's girlfriend") (2008).

== In politics ==
Boldi ran for the Italian Socialist Party at the 1992 elections. But this was a brief diversion, which he immediately abandoned to return to acting.

== Selected filmography ==
- Due cuori, una cappella (1975)
- What's Your Sign? (1975)
- La febbre del cinema (1975)
- Sturmtruppen (1976)
- Movie Rush – La febbre del cinema (1976)
- Luna di miele in tre (1976)
- Come ti rapisco il pupo (1976)
- Marcia trionfale (1976)
- Tre tigri contro tre tigri (1977)
- Il... Belpaese (1977)
- Io tigro, tu tigri, egli tigra (1978)
- Saxofone (1978)
- Maschio, femmina, fiore, frutto (1980)
- Sono fotogenico (1980)
- Prestami tua moglie (1980)
- A tutto gag (1980)
- Nessuno è perfetto (1981)
- L'esercito più pazzo del mondo (1981)
- Fracchia la belva umana (1981)
- Eccezzziunale... veramente (1982)
- Sturmtruppen II (1982)
- Si ringrazia la regione Puglia per averci fornito i milanesi (1982)
- Drive In (1983)
- Il ragazzo di campagna (1984)
- I due carabinieri (1984)
- I pompieri (1985)
- Il tenente dei carabinieri (1985)
- Yuppies (1986)
- Scuola di ladri (1986)
- Grandi magazzini (1986)
- Yuppies 2 (1986)
- Grand Hotel (1986, TV series)
- Missione eroica – I pompieri 2 (1987)
- Scuola di ladri parte seconda (1987)
- Montecarlo Gran Casinò (1987)
- Il volatore di Aquiloni (1987)
- Fantastico 8 (1987, TV series)
- Mia moglie è una bestia (1988)
- Fratelli d'Italia (1989)
- Vacanze di Natale '90 (1990)
- Vacanze di Natale '91 (1991)
- Anni 90 (1992)
- Scherzi a parte (1992, TV series)
- Sognando la California (1992)
- Anni 90: Parte II (1993)
- S.P.Q.R.: 2,000 and a Half Years Ago (1994)
- Vacanze di Natale '95 (1995)
- Festival (1996)
- A spasso nel tempo (1996)
- A spasso nel tempo – L'avventura continua (1997)
- Cucciolo (1998)
- Paparazzi (1998)
- Tifosi (1999)
- Vacanze di Natale 2000 (1999)
- Body Guards (2000)
- Merry Christmas (2001)
- Natale sul Nilo (2002)
- Natale in India (2003)
- Christmas in Love (2004)
- Caméra Café (2004, TV series)
- Natale a Miami (2005)
- Un ciclone in famiglia (2005–2007, TV series)
- Olé (2006)
- Matrimonio alle Bahamas (2007)
- La fidanzata di papà (2008)
- Un coccodrillo per amico (2009, TV film)
- Benvenuti in famiglia (2009, TV series)
- A Natale mi sposo (2010)
- Wedding in Paris (2011)
- What's Your Sign? (2014)
- Matrimonio al Sud (2015)
- La coppia dei campioni (2016)
- Un Natale al Sud (2016)
- Natale da chef (2017)
- Amici come prima (2018)
- In vacanza su Marte (2020)
