= Filmauro =

Italian media company

Filmauro S.r.l.
- Type: Società a responsabilità limitata
- Industry: Motion pictures
- Founded: 1975
- Headquarters: Rome, Italy
- Key people: Aurelio De Laurentiis
- Products: Motion pictures Home video Movie theaters
- Owner: Aurelio De Laurentiis
- Website: filmauro.it

Filmauro, stylized as FILMAURO, is an Italian entertainment company, involved primarily in the production and distribution of films, founded in 1975 by Luigi De Laurentiis.

The company catalogue counts over 400 movies. The company also owns a series of movie theaters in Rome, the Serie A football club Napoli and the Serie C football club Bari.

They produced the successful annual Cinepanettone films.
