= Fichi d'India =

Italian comedy duo

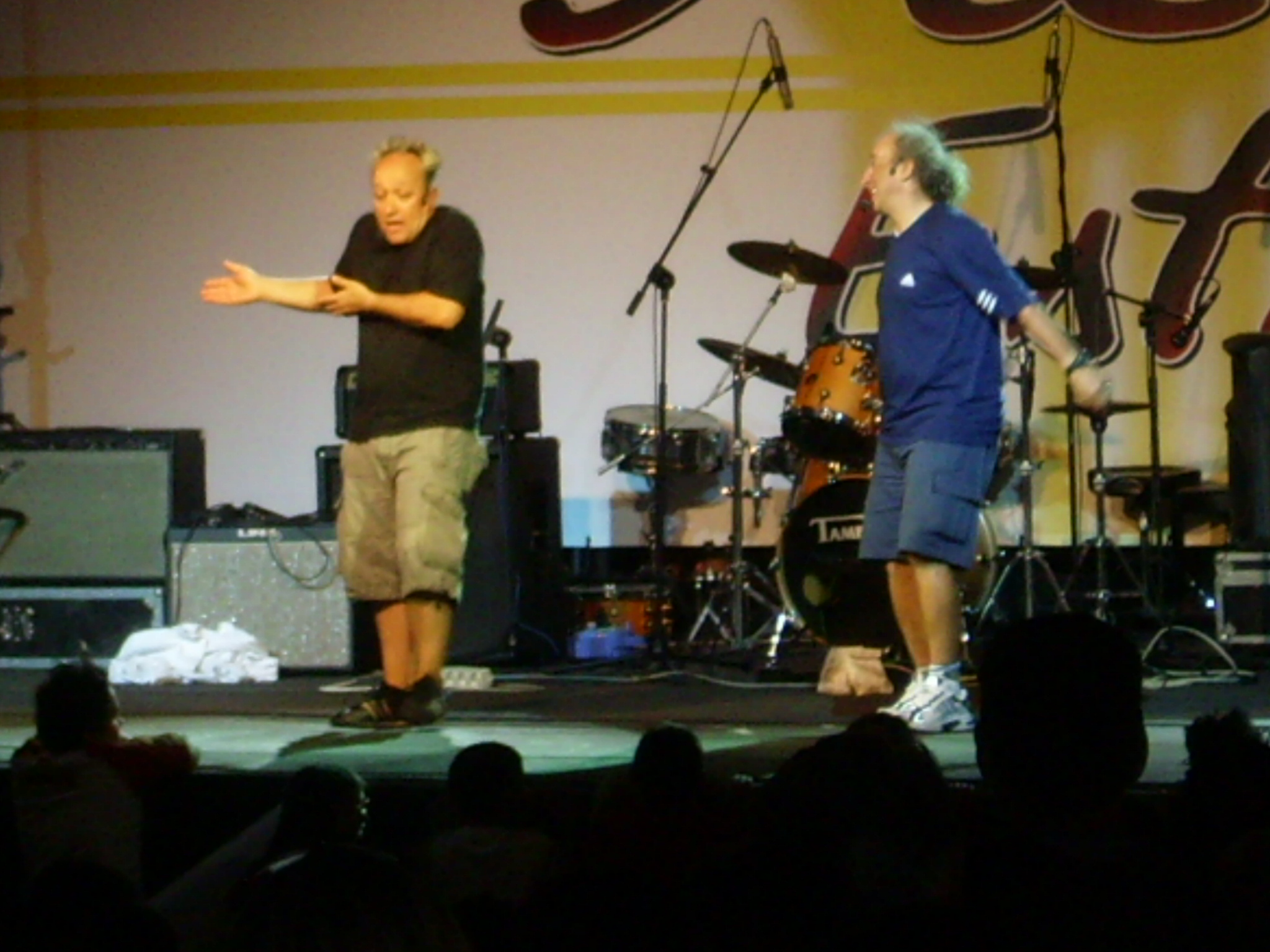
- Fichi d'India during the notte bianca event in Acqui Terme on 21 June 2008: on the left Max Cavallari, on the right Bruno Arena
- Occupation: Comedians

Bruno Arena
- Born: 12 January 1957; Milan, Italy
- Died: 28 September 2022 (aged 65); Milan, Italy
- Years active: 1983–2013

Max Cavallari
- Born: Massimiliano Cavallari; 8 July 1963 (age 62); Varese, Italy
- Years active: 1988–present

Fichi d'India were an Italian comedy duo made up of Bruno Arena (12 January 1957 – 28 September 2022) and Max Cavallari (born 8 July 1963), both actors and cabaret artists.

They started their artistic career in 1989 on the beaches of Palinuro, surrounded by Indian figs, which inspired their artistic name as a duo. In the same year they had their first show at the club Fuori Pasto, a cabaret club in Varese.

Since then they have performed both on radio and television, on channels including Italia 1, Canale 5, Italia 7, Radio Deejay, R101.

They also did theatrical performances, tours and movies.

They own the club Arlecchino, in Vedano Olona, where many cabaret artists from Milan and Varese became famous.

Arena died on 28 September 2022, at the age of 65.
