= Aurelio De Laurentiis =

Italian film producer and businessman

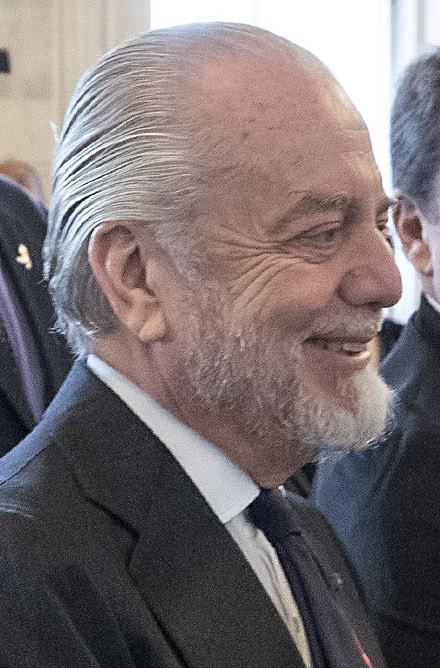
- De Laurentiis in 2019
- Born: 24 May 1949 (age 77); Rome, Italy
- Occupations: Film producer; businessman; owner of Filmauro; chairman of SSC Napoli
- Father: Luigi De Laurentiis
- Relatives: Dino De Laurentiis (uncle); Veronica De Laurentiis (cousin); Raffaella De Laurentiis (cousin); Federico De Laurentiis (cousin); Giada De Laurentiis (first cousin once removed)

Aurelio De Laurentiis (born 24 May 1949) is an Italian film producer. He owns the film production company Filmauro and the Italian football club Napoli (of which he is also chairman).

== Biography ==
He is the nephew of film producer Dino De Laurentiis and first cousin once removed of chef Giada De Laurentiis.

De Laurentiis serves on the board of directors of the National Italian American Foundation. In 1995, he was a member of the jury at the 19th Moscow International Film Festival.

After Napoli went bankrupt in 2004 and were relegated to Serie C1, the third division of Italian football, De Laurentiis bought the club with the ambition of bringing them back up the divisions whilst ensuring financial stability. After two promotions in three years, Napoli were back in Serie A. They spent the first few years in mid-table, and in the 2010–11 season qualified for the UEFA Champions League. Napoli spent the 2010s competing at the top of the table and in European football. The club went on to win the scudetto, the Serie A championship, in the 2022–23 and 2024–25 seasons.

== Filmography ==
- The Payoff (1978)
- Amici Miei, Atto II (1982)
- Vacanze di Natale (1983)
- Maccheroni (1985)
- Yuppies (1986)
- Private Access (1988)
- Leviathan (1989)
- Vacanze di Natale '91 (1991)
- Where the Night Begins (1991)
- Huevos de Oro (1993)
- Declarations of Love (1994)
- L'amico d'infanzia (1994)
- Men Men Men (1995)
- S.P.Q.R.: 2,000 and a Half Years Ago (1996)
- Black Holes (1995)
- Silenzio si nasce (1996)
- Festival (1996)
- The Mysterious Enchanter (1996)
- A spasso nel tempo (1994)
- Vacanze di Natale '95 (1995)
- Il testimone dello sposo (1998)
- Incontri proibiti (1998)
- Marriages (1998)
- Coppia omicida (1998)
- Il cielo in una stanza (1999)
- Tifosi Film (1997)
- Paparazzi (1998)
- Vacanze di Natale 2000 (1999)
- Bodyguards (2000)
- Amici ahrarara (2001)
- Merry Christmas (2001)
- Il nostro matrimonio è in crisi (2002)
- Natale sul Nilo (2002)
- Sky Captain and the World of Tomorrow (2004)
- Le barzellette (2004)
- Tutto in quella notte (2004)
- Christmas in Love (2004)
- What Will Happen to Us (2004)
- Christmas in Miami (2005)
- Manuale d'amore (2005)
- My Best Enemy (2006)
- Christmas in NYC (2006)
- Manual of Love 2 (2007)
- Natale in Crociera (2007)
- Grande, grosso e Verdone (2008)
- Christmas in Rio (2008)
- Latta e Cafè (2009)
- Christmas in Beverly Hills (2009)
- Italians (2009)
- Genitori & Figli Agitare bene prima dell'uso (2010)
- Natale in Sudafrica (2010)
- The Ages of Love (2011)
- Amici miei – Come tutto ebbe inizio (2011)
- Vacanze di Natale a Cortina (2011)
- A Flat for Three (2012)
- Lightning Strike (2012)
- The Third Half (2013)
- Colpi di fortuna (2013)
- Sotto una buona stella (2014)
- Un Natale Stupefacente (2014)
- L'abbiamo fatta grossa (2016)
- Natale a Londra – Dio salvi la regina (2017)
- Super vacanze di Natale (2017)

== Trophies won by club during presidency ==
=== Football ===
Napoli

- Serie A: 2022–23, 2024–25
- Coppa Italia: 2011–12, 2013–14, 2019–20
- Supercoppa Italiana : 2014, 2025–26 runner-up: 2020
