= Bruno Zambrini =

Italian composer and record producer (born 1935)

- Born: 5 April 1935 (age 90); Francavilla al Mare, Chieti
- Occupation(s): composer record producer

Bruno Zambrini (born 5 April 1935) is an Italian composer and record producer.

Born in Francavilla al Mare, Chieti, Zambrini graduated in composition at the Santa Cecilia Conservatory. In the 1960s he became a successful composer of pop songs, notably signing several hits by Gianni Morandi and Patty Pravo's "La bambola" Also active as a record producer, Zambrini composed many musical film scores, including Fracchia contro Dracula (1985), and often collaborated with Andrea and Paolo Amati. He was nominated to David di Donatello twice, in 2006 for Notte prima degli esami and in 2009 for Many Kisses Later.
