= Count Max =

Count Max may refer to:

- Count Max (1957 film), a 1957 Italian-Spanish comedy film
- Count Max (1991 film), a 1991 French-Italian comedy film
