= Domenico Cuomo =

Italian actor

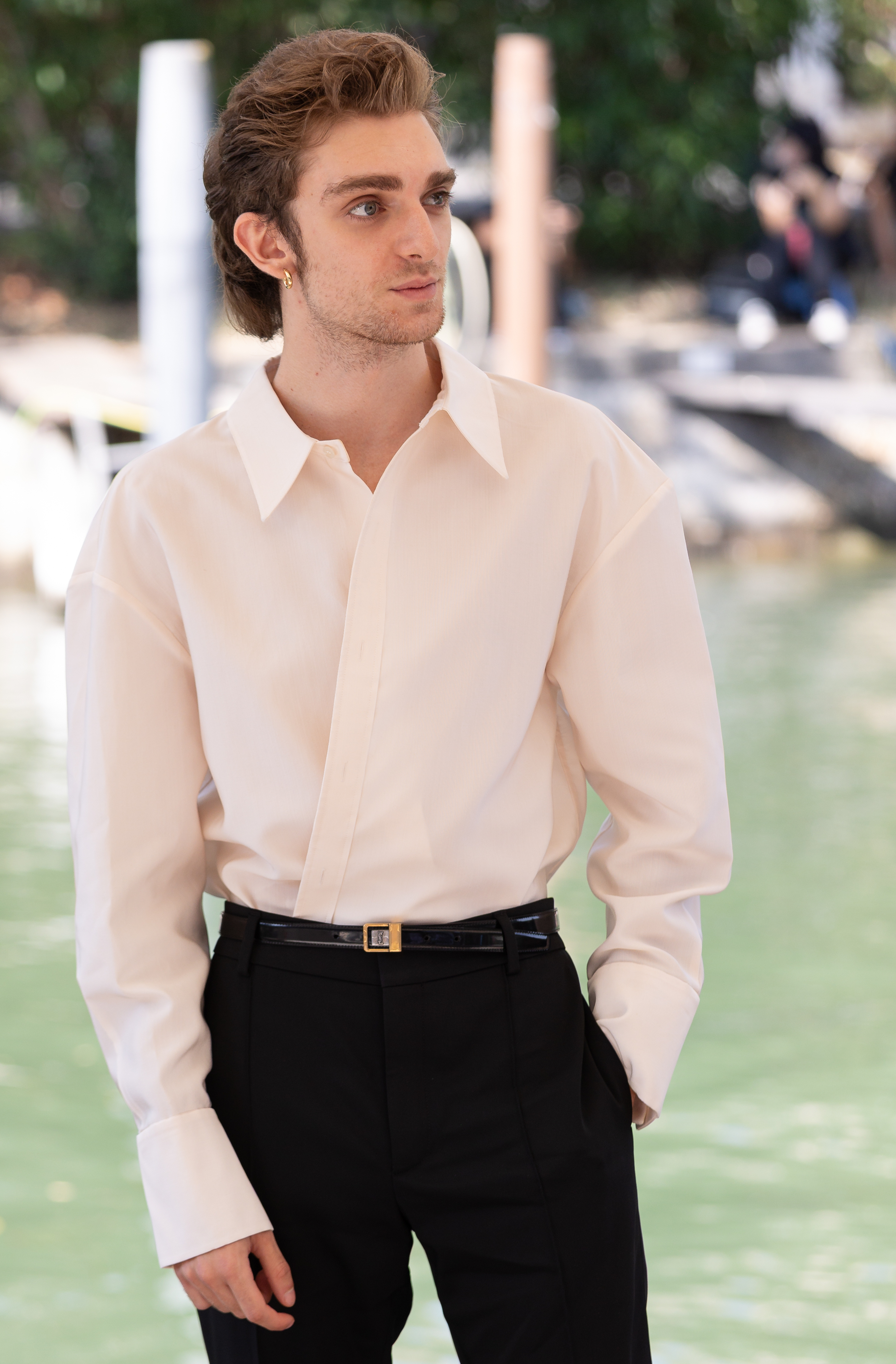
- Cuomo at the Venice International Film Festival 2024
- Born: February 6, 2004 (age 22); Gragnano, Naples, Italy
- Occupation: Actor

Domenico Cuomo (born February 6, 2004) is an Italian actor. He is best known for playing Gianni Russo in the Italian drama television series The Sea Beyond (2020–2025).

== Biography ==
Born in Gragnano, he attended Laborart Art Center from 2015 to 2020.

He began his career as a professional actor with the character of Cosimo in the third season of Gomorrah, a fiction produced by Sky. Later, he plays Antonio in the Rai fiction My Brilliant Friend and Gianni Russo, i.e. Cardiotrap, in The Sea Beyond, one of RAI's most successful titles. In 2019 he is Lorenzo in Catch-22, a historical miniseries starring George Clooney, Kyle Chandler, and Hugh Laurie. Since 2021 he takes on the role of Mimmo Bruni in the drama Un professore. He made his big-screen debut in 2020 with Alessandra – Un grande amore e niente più, and in 2023 he portrayed the title character in the horror film Mimì: Prince of Darkness, Brando De Sica's directorial debut. In theater he is among the main characters in the shows Tredici – il musical contro il bullismo and Scugnizzi 2.0, both directed by Amelia Mascia. Also, in 2023 he is also the narrator of the documentary Mi chiamo Giancarlo Siani.

== Filmography ==
=== Film ===
| Year | Title | Role(s) | Notes |
|---|---|---|---|
| 2020 | Alessandra – Un grande amore e niente più | Roberto at 15 | |
| 2023 | Mimì: Prince of Darkness | Mimì | |

=== Television ===
| Year | Title | Role(s) | Notes |
|---|---|---|---|
| 2017 | Gomorrah | Cosimo | Recurring role; 5 episodes |
| 2018 | My Brilliant Friend | Antonio Cappuccio | Recurring role; 3 episodes |
| 2019 | Catch-22 | Lorenzo | Miniseries |
| 2020–2025 | The Sea Beyond | Gianni "Cardiotrap" Russo | Main role (seasons 1-5) |
| 2021 | Inspector Ricciardi | Andrea Capece | Episode: "Il posto di ognuno" |
| 2021–2023 | Un professore | Mimmo Bruni | Recurring role (season 1); main role (season 2) |
| 2025 | Hotel Costiera | Dario | Episode: "Sheryl" |

== Awards and nominations ==
- 2019
  - Culturale Magister Giovanni Ferrario Award for The Sea Beyond.
- 2021
  - Award at the Biesse National Competition "Justice and Humanity Free to Choose" for the short film "Monologo".
- 2023
  - Next Generation Awards as Best Revealing Actor.
  - Premio Speciale Ciak Generation at Next Generation Awards.
  - David di Donatello Awards as Italian Rising Star.
  - Nomination at Ciak d'oro as Annual Rising Star for his role in Mimì: Prince of Darkness.
- 2024
  - Vespertilio Awards as Best Leading Actor for his role in Mimì: Prince of Darkness.
  - Nomination at Ciak d'oro as Best Audience Performance Under 30 for his role in the second season of Un professore.
  - Nastro d'Argento Hamilton - Behind The Camera for Mimì: Prince of Darkness.
  - Giffoni Film Festival as Explosive Talent Award.
  - Filming Italy Spotlight Award at 81st Venice International Film Festival in the category "Young Generation" for Mimì: Prince of Darkness.
