= Brando De Sica =

Italian actor, director and screenwriter

- Born: 1983 (age 42–43)
- Occupations: Film director, actor, screenwriter

Brando De Sica is an Italian actor, director, and screenwriter. He is a member of a prominent artistic Italian family of De Sica and Verdone, a grandson of Vittorio De Sica.

== Biography ==
De Sica was born in Rome in 1983. He comes from a distinguished family of cinema stars and filmmakers: he is a son of Christian De Sica and Silvia Verdone, and a grandson of Vittorio De Sica, María Mercader, Mario Verdone. De Sica's uncle Manuel De Sica was a composer, while his cousins Carlo and Luca Verdone were film directors. He debuted on the big screen in 1993 in a small part in Anni 90: Parte II. In 1996, he played in A spasso nel tempo, followed by a 1997 sequel A spasso nel tempo - L'avventura continua, then 3, and 1998 Paparazzi. After these acting efforts, he moved to Los Angeles and studied film directing at the University of Southern California. There he directed a short The Man Who Wanted to Go to Mars (Italian: L'uomo che voleva andare su Marte) which convinced his parents to entrust him with directing a feature.

Upon return to Italy, in 2008, he directed his feature debut, Parlarmi di me, based on the 2006 Parlami di me (theatre play) of the same name created by his father. He was an assistant director to Pupi Avati with A Second Childhood. De Sica's 2015 short L'errore was screened at the Cannes Film Festival. For L'errore, he was awarded with Nastro d'Argento as the Best Director, got the Best Advertising prize at the Diane Pernet ASVOFF festival, and was nominated for David di Donatello award. His next short, Non senza di me, was also critically acclaimed and received a Golden Globes nomination.

In 2018, he released his sophomore feature, Amici come prima. In 2019, he worked as a sound designer on Matteo Garrone's Pinocchio which also brought De Sica a Donatello nomination and a Nastro d'Argento for Best Sound.

In 2021, he directed a campaign for Michael Kors where his stars were Naomie Harris and Bella Hadid.

In 2023, De Sica released the horror film Mimì: Prince of Darkness which was presented in Out of Competition section of the Locarno Film Festival. The film got positive critical reviews, won Best Cinematography award at the 2023 Sitges Film Festival and was nominated for Vespertilio Awards.

== Filmography ==
=== Actor ===
==== Cinema ====
- Anni 90: Parte II, by Enrico Oldoini (1993)
- A spasso nel tempo, by Carlo Vanzina (1996)
- 3, by Christian De Sica (1996)
- A spasso nel tempo - L'avventura continua, by Carlo Vanzina (1997)
- Paparazzi, by Neri Parenti (1998)

==== TV ====
- Anni '60 (TV series), by Carlo Vanzina – TV series (1999)
- Compagni di scuola (TV series) – TV series (2001)
- Attenti a quei tre (TV), by Rossella Izzo – TV series (2004)

=== Director ===
- Parlami di me (theatre play) (2008)
- Ora o mai – short (2013)
- La donna giusta – short (2014)
- L'errore – short (2015)
- Non senza di me – short (2016)
- Aria – short (2018)
- Amici come prima – uncredited (2018)
- Sono solo fantasmi – uncredited (2019)
- Mimì: Prince of Darkness (2023)
