= Paparazzi (1998 Italian film) =

- Directed by: Neri Parenti
- Written by: Neri Parenti
- Produced by: Aurelio De Laurentiis
- Starring: Christian De Sica; Massimo Boldi; Diego Abatantuono; Roberto Brunetti; Nino D'Angelo
- Cinematography: Carlo Tafani
- Edited by: Sergio Montanari
- Music by: Bruno Zambrini
- Distributed by: Filmauro
- Release date: 18 December 1998
- Running time: 103 minutes
- Country: Italy
- Language: Italian
- Box office: $9.7 million (Italy)

Paparazzi is a 1998 Italian comedy film directed by Neri Parenti.

== Cast ==
- Christian De Sica as Cesare Proietti, aka Il Faina
- Massimo Boldi as Giacomo Colombo, aka Signor Bin
- Diego Abatantuono as Ugo Conti, aka King
- Roberto Brunetti as Remo Cartocci, aka Er Patata
- Nino D'Angelo as Ciro Cuccurullo, aka Ciro 3000
- Paolo Conticini as Elenoire Casalegno's boyfriend
- Roberto Farnesi as Anna Falchi's boyfriend
- Barbara Chiappini as Ela Weber's friend
- Patrizia Loreti as Alba Parietti's waitress
- Stefano Antonucci as the surgeon
- Brando De Sica as the waiter in the hotel
- Ugo Conti as Toni
- Morena De Pasquale as the nurse
- Mario Parodi as Brigitte Nielsen's lover
- Sacha M. Darwin as the old nun
- Carlo De Palma as the lifeguard
- Massimo Pittarello as Anna Falchi's bodyguard
- Cristina Parovel as Stefania
- Riccardo Parisio Perrotti as the blind man
- Mohammed Badr-Salem as a clinic patient

The cast include cameos of Italian celebrities playing themselves, most notably Ramona Badescu, Rino Barillari, Aldo Biscardi, Nathalie Caldonazzo, Elenoire Casalegno, Martina Colombari, Carlo Conti, Carmen Di Pietro, Natalia Estrada, Anna Falchi, Emilio Fede, Tiziana Ferrario, Gabriel Garko, Eva Grimaldi, Claudio Lippi, Valeria Mazza, Maurizio Mosca, Alessandro Nesta, Brigitte Nielsen, Alba Parietti, Sandro Paternostro, Luana Ravegnini, Vittorio Sgarbi, Mara Venier and Ela Weber.

== Box office ==
The film was one of the highest grossing in Italy for the year, with a gross of $9.7 million.
