= A spasso nel tempo =

- Directed by: Carlo Vanzina
- Written by: Carlo Vanzina; Enrico Vanzina
- Produced by: Aurelio De Laurentiis
- Starring: Christian De Sica; Massimo Boldi; Dean Jones
- Cinematography: Gianlorenzo Battaglia
- Edited by: Sergio Montanari
- Music by: Manuel De Sica
- Distributed by: Filmauro
- Release date: 13 December 1996
- Running time: 94 minutes
- Country: Italy
- Language: Italian

A spasso nel tempo (lit. 'Getting around in time') is a 1996 Italian science fiction adventure comedy film directed by Carlo Vanzina.

The film is included in the Italian sub-genre of cinepanettoni. According to Adam O'Leary, A spasso nel tempo and its sequel are "farcical elaborations of the Back to the Future films which riff on schoolbook history and on film and television culture".

== Plot ==
Two Italian families meet in Universal Pictures' amusement park. Ascanio Colonna (Ascanio Orsini Varaldo in the original version) is a Roman prince, who immediately goes into battle with the Milanese Walter Colombo (Walter Boso in the original version), manager of a cinema. When the two families have to take the joust of Professor Mortimer's "Machine of Time", the machine jams right when Ascanio and Walter get on board. The two are sent in the Prehistoric era, and Professor Mortimer tries in every way to bring them back in the present era, making the two enemies a journey in all the eras of Time.

== Cast ==
- Christian De Sica as Ascanio Colonna
- Massimo Boldi as Walter Colombo
- Dean Jones as Professor Mortimer / Joe
- Marco Messeri as Lorenzo il Magnifico
- Ela Weber as Natasha
- Veronica Logan as Michaela
- Brando De Sica as Aspreno Colonna
- Virginie Marsan as Giusy
- Erica Beltrami as Gina
- Gea Martire as Rosanna
- Manuela Arcuri as young Rosanna

== Release ==
The film opened at number two at the Italian box office, behind the second weekend of The Hunchback of Notre Dame, with a gross of $1,869,843 from 123 screens in its opening weekend. It became number one during the Christmas holidays. A sequel entitled A spasso nel tempo – L'avventura continua was released in 1997.
