= Vespertilio Awards =

Italian genre movie award

- Location: Rome
- Established: 2022
- Awards: Ore D’Orrore
- Directors: Tania Bizzarro; Markus Di Meglio
- Website: www.oredorrore.it

The Vespertilio Awards is an independent Italian film festival dedicated to Italian horror and genre movies.

== Profile ==
The award was established in 2022 by Tania Bizzarro and Markus Di Meglio, creators of a popular platform Ore D’orrore. The award became the first one in Italy dedicated to horror, thriller, fantasy, dark fantasy and sci-fi genres. The main prize of Vespertilio Awards is Ore D’orrore which is awarded in 15 nominations.

== Editions ==
=== 2022 ===
The inaugural edition took place on the 26 of August, 2022. A Classic Horror Story was honoured with the Best Film award, Matilda Lutz was selected Best Actress for her performance in the movie.

=== 2023 ===
The second edition took place on May 23, 2023. The Oro d’orrore went to L’Angelo dei muri by Lorenzo Bianchini, Best Director — Paolo Strippoli (for Flowing). Stefano Cananzi was awarded with Vespertilio Speciale In Memoriam.

=== 2024 ===
The third edition took place on May 24, 2024. 31 prizes were distributed. Pupi Avati, Florinda Bolkan, and Sergio Martino, were honored with lifetime achievement awards. Mimì: Prince of Darkness by Brando De Sica won several awards, including Best Film. La guerra del Tiburtino III by Luna Gualano won 4 awards, including Best Supporting Actor for Paolo Calabresi, Fabio D'Orta's debut film, The Complex Forms, wins Best Cinematography (Fabio D'Orta) and Best Production.(Metronic Films). and the Aldo Lado award was established and given for the first time to Il paese del melodramma, directed by Francesco Barilli.

=== 2025 ===
The fourth edition took place on May 25, 2025. 31 prizes were distributed. The Body by vincenzo Alfieri won several awards, including Best Film. Amen by Andrea Baroni won 4 awards, including Best Supporting Actress for Paola Sambo, Romano Montesarchio’s film, Glory Hole, wins Best Original Screenplay. and the Aldo Lado award was given for to Funérailles, directed by Antonio Bido.

and the Claudio Lattanzi award was established and given for the first time to Glory Hole, directed by Romano Montesarchio.

=== 2026 ===
The fifth edition took place on May 23, 2025. 31 prizes were distributed in a new location the Teatro Marconi
