= Damiano Gavino =

Italian actor

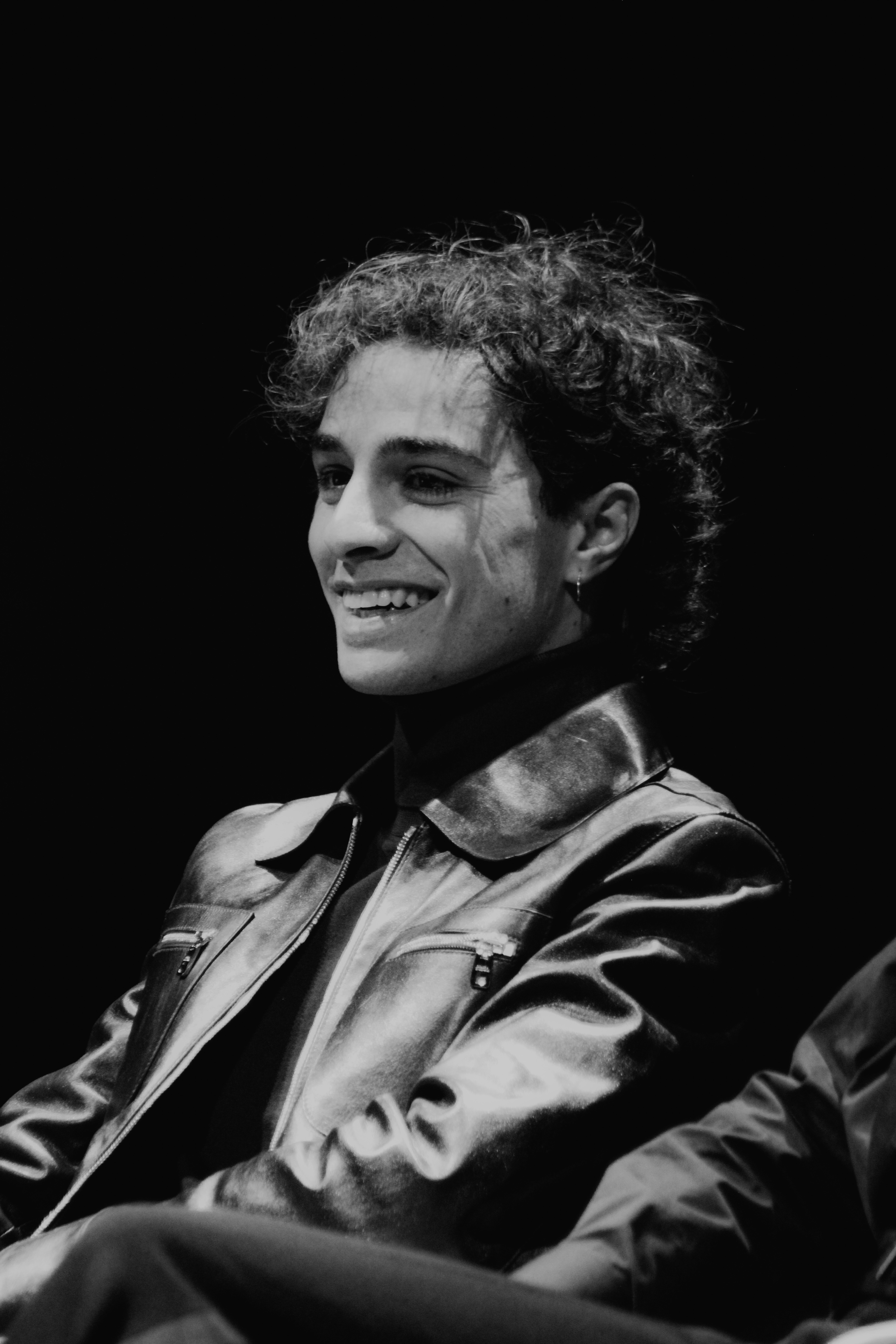
- Gavino in 2023
- Born: 16 November 2001 (age 24); Rome, Italy
- Occupation: Actor
- Years active: 2021–present
- Known for: Un professore
- Relatives: Lea Gavino (sister)

Damiano Gavino (born 16 November 2001) is an Italian actor. He is best known for playing Manuel Ferro in the Rai 1 television series Un professore (2021–present).

== Early life and education ==
Gavino was born in Rome in 2001. He is the brother of actress and singer Lea Gavino, best known for her role as Viola in Skam Italia.

Being a graduate from a music high school, he can play piano, guitar, double bass and drums.

== Career ==
Gavino began his artistic career in 2021 with The Boat, a film directed by Alessandro Liguori where he made a small appearance. He then gained popularity thanks to the role of Manuel Ferro in the Rai 1 series Un professore. He then starres in the series Shake, a modern reinterpretation of Shakespeare's Othello, where he played Leo Adriani. In 2023, he starred in Ferzan Özpetek's fourteenth directorial film, Nuovo Olimpo, in which he had the role of Enea Monti. In 2024, he was cast as the lead in the film of the Italian adaptation of the manga Prophecy by Tetsuya Tsutsui.

== Filmography ==
=== Film ===
Year	Title	Role(s)	Notes
2023	Nuovo Olimpo	Enea Monti	
2025	Prophecy	Giona	

=== Television ===
Year	Title	Role(s)	Notes
2021–present	Un professore	Manuel Ferro	Main role (36 episodes)
2023	Shake	Leonardo	Main role (8 episodes)

== Awards and nominations ==
Year	Award	Category	Nominated work	Result	Ref.
2023	Ciak d'Oro	Revelation of the Year	Nuovo Olimpo	Won	
2024	Cineuphoria Award	Best Duo (with Andrea Di Luigi)	Nuovo Olimpo	Won	
2024	Premio Nuti	Best Young Actor	Nuovo Olimpo	Won	
2024	Bellaria Film Festival	Zefiro Award	Nuovo Olimpo	Won	
