= Nuovo Olimpo =

2023 Italian film by Ferzan Özpetek

- Italian Netflix poster
- Directed by: Ferzan Özpetek
- Written by: Ferzan Özpetek; Gianni Romoli
- Produced by: Tilde Corsi; Gianni Romoli
- Starring: Damiano Gavino; Andrea Di Luigi; Luisa Ranieri; Greta Scarano; Aurora Giovinazzo; Alvise Rigo; Giancarlo Commare
- Cinematography: Gian Filippo Corticelli
- Edited by: Pietro Morana
- Music by: Andrea Guerra
- Production companies: R&C Produzioni; Faros Film
- Distributed by: Netflix
- Release dates: 22 October 2023 (Rome); 1 November 2023 (Worldwide)
- Running time: 111 minutes
- Country: Italy
- Language: Italian

Nuovo Olimpo is a 2023 Italian romantic drama film written and directed by Ferzan Özpetek. It tells the story of two men who meet and fall in love in late-1970s Rome, only to be separated unexpectedly. It premiered at the Rome Film Festival on 22 October 2023 and was released on Netflix on 1 November 2023.

== Plot ==
In 1978, during the Years of Lead in Italy, Pietro, a shy medical student, sees a film at the Nuovo Olimpo theater, which is run by the exuberant Titti and used by gay men for cruising. There, he meets Enea, a film student, and there is an immediate attraction between them. Enea invites Pietro to have a sexual encounter in the bathroom, but Pietro is hesitant. Later, Enea tells his friend and lover Alice about the encounter, and she gives him a key to her grandmother's unoccupied apartment. The next day, Pietro and Enea meet at the theater and have sex at the apartment. They spend the night together and develop feelings for one another, arranging to meet up at the Nuovo Olimpo the next day. Pietro tells Enea that he booked a reservation for them at a trattoria, but he needs to visit his mother at the hospital first. While Pietro is gone, an anti-fascist protest outside becomes unruly and havoc breaks out in the theater. Titti helps Enea escape the theater and he goes searching for Pietro, but to no avail. As they hadn't exchanged phone numbers or addresses, they lose all contact.

A decade later, in 1988, Enea is a director who is famous from his most recent film, a fictional depiction of his brief romance with Pietro. Pietro, meanwhile, is married to a woman named Giulia. Without knowing the director, Pietro and Giulia see Enea's film, and Pietro is overcome by the similarities between the film and his own life. Giulia is puzzled and suspicious about his reaction to the film. Pietro visits the Nuovo Olimpo, which is no longer run by Titti and instead is now an adult movie theater. There, he sees Ernesto, whom he had met with Enea ten years prior. Ernesto tells him that Enea is now a famous director. At a party, Enea meets a man named Antonio and they immediately strike up a romance.

In 1993, Enea, Antonio, and Alice are on a train about to leave for a film festival. Enea is shocked by the recent news of Federico Fellini's passing and looks out the window to see Pietro and Giulia on the adjacent train. Their train departs, however, without Pietro noticing Enea. Later, Pietro, now an ophthalmologist, sees Enea's film festival interview on a television at his hospital. While grocery shopping, Enea sees Titti, who asks him why he never returned to the theater and tells him that Pietro had left him a letter. The letter contained Pietro's phone number, and Enea calls it, only to find out that it had been disconnected. Later, the film that Pietro and Enea had seen at the Nuovo Olimpo plays on television, and both of them watch it with their respective partners. Pietro decides to go to Rome to find Enea, and ends up at his press conference. When asked about being the first Italian director to publicly come out, Enea credits his relationship with Antonio, the love of his life. Pietro leaves, disappointed. Meanwhile, Enea is still shaken by the letter and his memories of Pietro.

In 2015, Enea is shooting his 14th film. A stunt at work goes wrong, and Enea is rushed to the hospital after glass powder temporarily blinds him. His operating surgeon is Pietro, who is shocked to see Enea in person after almost 40 years. The surgery is a success and Enea is left with bandages over his eyes for a week while he recovers. While meeting with his treatment team, Enea recognizes Pietro's voice and invites him to his apartment, which is the apartment that used to belong to Alice's grandmother. They exchange words, but Pietro leaves before Enea removes his bandages. Giulia, a fan of Enea's, invites Enea to dinner at her and Pietro's house. Enea arrives and is shocked to find out that his suspicions were correct and that his doctor was indeed Pietro. At dinner, Giulia notices Pietro and Enea staring at each other. After dinner, although heartbroken that Pietro had never looked at her that way, she urges him to go after Enea. Pietro and Enea meet again in the street, but, recognizing that their lives are too different, they instead promise not to forget each other. They part ways knowing that their lives would have been vastly different had they not been separated back in 1978.

== Cast ==
- Damiano Gavino as Enea Monte
- Andrea Di Luigi as Pietro Gherardi
- Luisa Ranieri as Titti
- Greta Scarano as Giulia
- Aurora Giovinazzo as Alice
- Alvise Rigo as Antonio
- Giancarlo Commare as Ernesto "Molotov"
- Annandrea Vitrano as Laura

== Production ==
The film is semi-autobiographical, with elements of the story being taken from writer and director Ferzan Özpetek's own life and career. He stated, "The starting point of the film is a true story that happened to me in the '70s and that for a long time I wanted to use as an inspiration to make a film."

The film was shot entirely in Rome, specifically in Municipio III and Monte Sacro. Principal photography began in November 2022.

== Release ==
The film premiered at the Rome Film Festival on 22 October 2023. It was later released on Netflix on 1 November.

A teaser trailer for the film premiered during the first night of the Sanremo Music Festival 2023. The official trailer was released on 19 September 2023.

== Reception ==
John Sooja of Common Sense Media called the film "gorgeously shot," but wrote, "While the film meanders a bit in the middle and final third, jumping from time frame to time frame, the inevitable resolution perhaps feels a bit anticlimactic by the time it rolls around."

It received a nomination for Outstanding Film - Streaming or TV at the 35th GLAAD Media Awards.
