= Lea Gavino =

Italian singer-songwriter (born 2001)

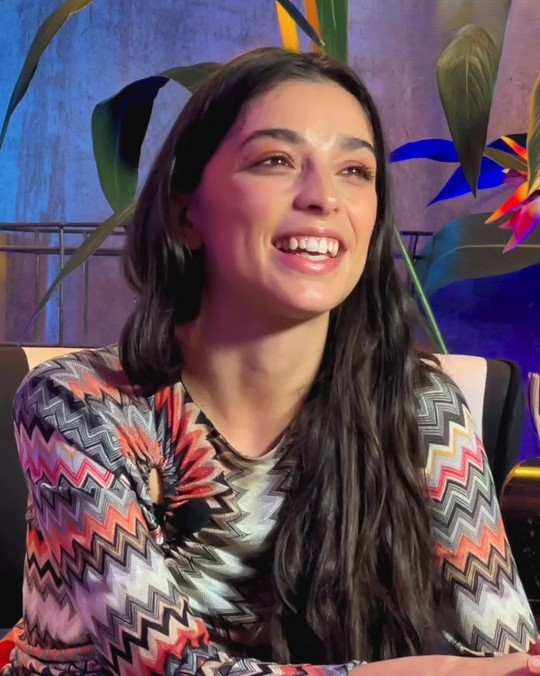
- Lea Gavino in June 2024
- Born: 14 January 1999 (age 27); Rome, Lazio, Italy
- Occupations: Actress; singer; songwriter
- Years active: 2019–present
- Relatives: Damiano Gavino (brother)
- Musical career
- Genre: Pop
- Instruments: Vocals; piano
- Years active: 2025–present
- Labels: LaTarma; Warner

Lea Gavino (born 14 January 1999) is an Italian actress and singer-songwriter.

== Early life and education ==
Born in Rome in 1999, she is the older sister of actor Damiano Gavino. After high school, she decided to enroll in college to study psychology, where she earned a degree. Around the same time, a casting director and family friend recruited her for an audition, which then began the lengthy selection process for the Gianmaria Volontè School of Cinematographic Arts, which she entered in 2019.

== Career ==
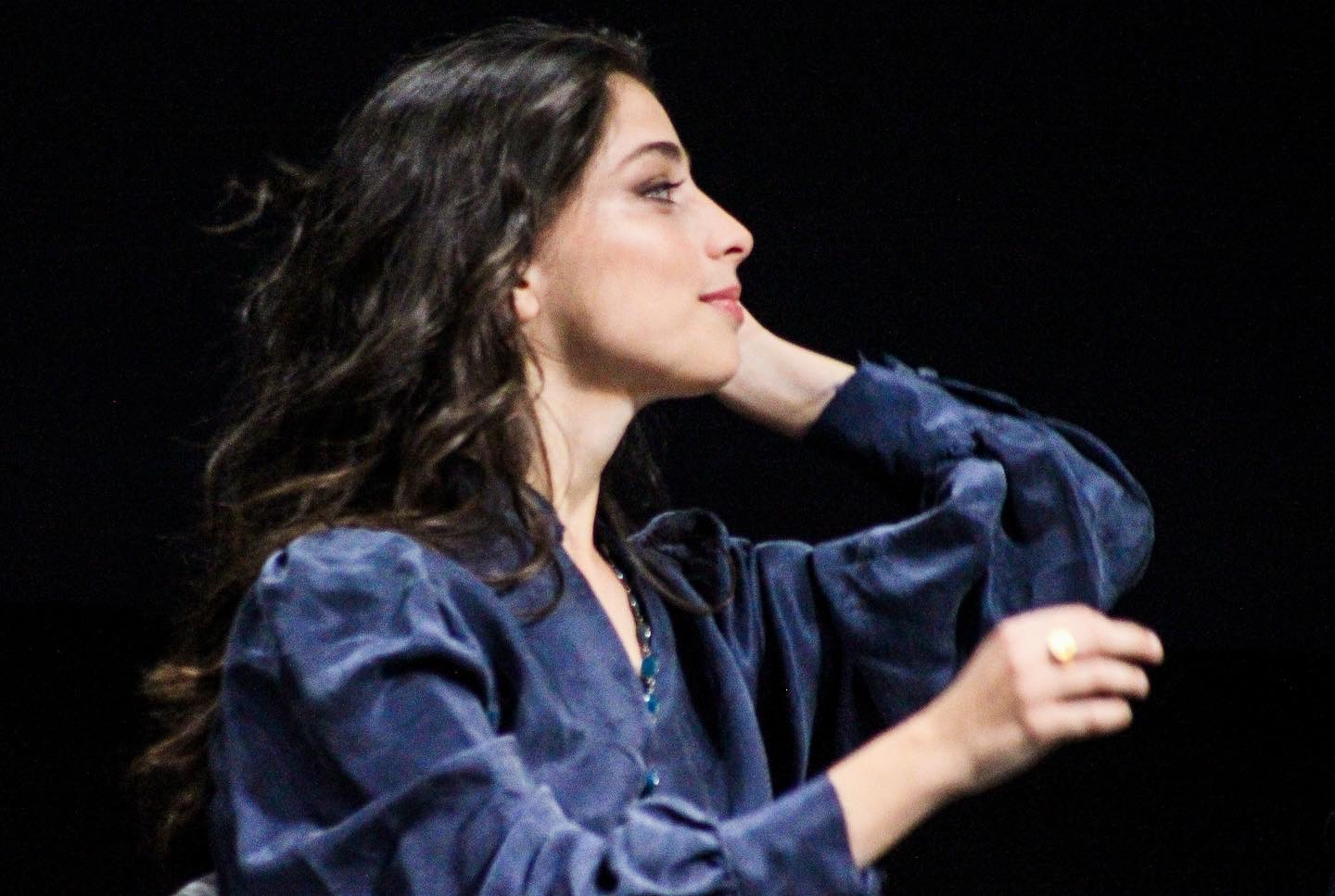
Lea Gavino in November 2022

In 2019, she made her acting debut in the Rai 1 television film Io ricordo, Piazza Fontana, directed by Francesco Miccichè. Her film debut was in the film Caravaggio's Shadow (2022), directed by Michele Placido; she then co-starred in the fifth season of the Netflix series Skam Italia.

She was part of the cast of the international series SAS: Rogue Heroes (2023), distributed worldwide by the BBC. The following year, she co-starred in the film Una storia nera, directed by Leonardo D'Agostini.

She signed a recording contract with LaTarma Records, with which she made her music debut, releasing her first two singles, "Mondo fiorito" and "Figli" (2025), the latter dedicated to her brother Damiano. She subsequently participated in the nineteenth edition of the Sanremo Giovani singing competition with the song "Amico lontano", but failed to qualify for the Sanremo Music Festival 2026.

On 6 February 2026 the single "I treni" was released. In March she played the role of Consuelo Favia in the Rai 1 series Guerrieri: La regola dell'equilibrio. On 17 April Scar's album Esordienti 1994 was released, in which Lea collaborated on the track "Una cosa normale".

On 1 May 2026 she released his first EP 11 volte, which included his first four singles together with the title track and the single "Serratura", performed on the same day during the Concertone in Piazza San Giovanni in Laterano in Rome.

== Filmography ==
=== Film ===
Year	Title	Role(s)
2022	Caravaggio's Shadow	Artemisia Gentileschi
2023	Una storia nera	Rosa Semerano
2024	Dieci minuti	

=== Television ===
Year	Title	Role(s)	Notes
2019	Io ricordo, Piazza Fontana	Federica Dendena	Television movie
2022–2024	Skam Italia	Viola Loiero	Main role (season 5–6)
2025	SAS: Rogue Heroes	Sofia Amato	Season 2, episode 4
2025	Sanremo Giovani	Contestant	Annual music festival, competing with "Amico lontano"
2026	Guerrieri: La regola dell'equilibrio	Consuelo Favia	Main role

== Discography ==
=== Extended plays ===
List of EPs
Title	EP details
11 volte	Released: 1 May 2026; Label: LaTarma, ADA, Warner Music Italy; Format: CD, digital download, streaming

=== Singles ===
List of singles and album name
Title	Year	Album or EP
"Mondo fiorito"	2025	11 volte
"Figli"	2025	11 volte
"Amico lontano"	2025	11 volte
"I treni"	2026	11 volte
"Serratura"	2026	11 volte

=== Collaborations ===
List of singles as featured artist
Title	Year	Album or EP
"Una cosa normale" (Scar featuring Lea Gavino)	2026	Esordienti 199

== Participation in singing events ==
- Sanremo Giovani (Rai 2)
  - 2025 – Participant with "Amico lontano"
