= The Clan (2005 film) =

2005 Italian comedy film

- Directed by: Christian De Sica
- Written by: Christian De Sica; Fausto Brizzi; Marco Martani
- Produced by: Guido De Angelis; Maurizio De Angelis
- Starring: Christian De Sica; Paolo Conticini; Sebastien Torkia
- Cinematography: Gianlorenzo Battaglia
- Edited by: Raimondo Crociani
- Music by: Guido De Angelis; Maurizio De Angelis
- Distributed by: 01 Distribution
- Release date: 11 March 2005 (Italy)
- Running time: 95 minutes
- Country: Italy
- Language: Italian

The Clan is a 2005 Italian musical comedy film directed by Christian De Sica.

== Cast ==
- Christian De Sica as Franco
- Paolo Conticini as Dino
- Sebastien Torkia as Sammy
- Andrea Osvárt as Patricia
- Linda Batista as Helen Carter
- Max Tortora as Bob / Otello / Pedro
- Anna Longhi as Aunt Luciana
- Hristo Dimitrov as the policeman
- Nadia Rinaldi as the nun
