= Bruno Corazzari =

Italian actor (1940–2021)

- Born: 30 December 1940; Castellarano, Reggio Emilia, Italy
- Died: 29 July 2021 (aged 80); Nepi, Lazio, Italy
- Occupation: Actor

Bruno Corazzari (30 December 1940 – 29 July 2021) was an Italian film, television and stage actor.

== Life and career ==
Born in Castellarano, Reggio Emilia, Corazzari started his career in the second half of the sixties, playing minor roles in a number of Spaghetti Western films, usually being cast as a bad gunslinger and a member of the villain's band. In a few years, he played roles of greater weight in other genres, namely giallo, poliziotteschi and adventure films. He was also active in art films, working with Marco Bellocchio, Franco Brocani and Maurizio Ponzi, among others. Since the late 1970s, Corazzari had focused his activities on television, appearing on numerous TV films and series, sometimes in main roles. Corazzari died in Nepi on 29 July 2021, at the age of 80.

== Selected filmography ==
- Death Rides a Horse (1967) - Walcott's Bartender
- Halleluja for Django (1967)
- Vengeance Is Mine (1967) - Gary
- The Belle Starr Story (1968) - Pinkerton Man
- A Long Ride from Hell (1968) - Shorty
- Days of Fire (1968) - Affatato
- Ace High (1968) - Scaife
- The Great Silence (1968) - Charlie (uncredited)
- Once Upon a Time in the West (1968) - 3rd Member of Cheyenne's Gang (uncredited)
- A Taste of Death (1968)
- Battle of the Commandos (1969) - Pvt. Frank Madigan
- Fortunata y Jacinta (1969) - Maximiliano Rubín
- Stagecoach of the Condemned (1970) - Anthony Stevens
- Roy Colt and Winchester Jack (1970) - Reverend's lead henchman
- Adiós, Sabata (1970) - Hertz
- A Man Called Sledge (1970) - Bice
- Necropolis (1970) - Frankenstein's monster
- Cloud of Dust... Cry of Death... Sartana Is Coming (1970) - Sam Puttnam
- The Strange Vice of Mrs. Wardh (1971) - Killer
- Terrible Day of the Big Gundown (1971) - Rod Fargas
- Drummer of Vengeance (1971) - Bill
- La primera entrega (1971)
- Seven Blood-Stained Orchids (1972) - Barrett
- The Master Touch (1972) - Eric
- The Sicilian Connection (1972) - Larry
- High Crime (1973) - Scavino's Assassin
- The Violent Professionals (1973) - Hood
- Anna: the Pleasure, the Torment (1973) - Albino
- Ingrid sulla strada (1974) - The painter
- Last Days of Mussolini (1974) - Lt. Fritz Birzer
- La muerte llama a las 10 (1974) - JOHN Kirk Lawford
- Puzzle (1974) - George
- E cominciò il viaggio nella vertigine (1974) - Secundo ufficiale nel treno
- The Suspect (1975) - Tommaso Lenzini
- Giubbe rosse (1975) - Logan
- Four of the Apocalypse (1975) - Lemmy
- Quanto è bello lu murire acciso (1975) - 'Ntoni
- La Orca (1976) - Paolo
- Live Like a Cop, Die Like a Man (1976) - Morandi
- The Cynic, the Rat and the Fist (1977) - Ettore
- I Am Afraid (1977) - La Rosa
- Sette note in nero (1977) - Canevari
- The Black Cat (1981) - Ferguson
- Dove volano i corvi d'argento (1982)
- Hanna K. (1983) - Court president
- Thunder Warrior (1983) - Frank
- Il tenente dei carabinieri (1986) - Lorenzini
- La vita di scorta (1986) - Alfio
- The Moro Affair (1986) - Secretary of the DC
- Black Tunnel (1986) - Huppert
- A Taxi Driver in New York (1987)
- The Green Inferno (1988) - Child Smuggler
- Un uomo di razza (1989) - Sandro
- The Sleazy Uncle (1989) - Il medico
- Mal d'Africa (1990) - Mike
- L'avvoltoio può attendere (1991) - Gary
- Count Max (1991) - George
- Crazy Underwear (1992) - TV Director
- Body Puzzle (1992) - Prof. Brusco
- Ricky & Barabba (1992) - Sandro Bonetti
- Nel continente nero (1993) - Armando Feletti
- Fade out (Dissolvenza al nero) (1994)
- Marching in Darkness (1996) - The Colonel
- The Prince of Homburg (1997) - Kottwitz
- Ogni volta che te ne vai (2004) - Galvan
