= Regina Orioli =

Italian actress (born 1977)

- Born: 15 May 1977 (age 48); Rome, Italy
- Occupation: Actress
- Years active: 1997–present

Regina Orioli (born 15 May 1977) is an Italian actress who is best known for her role as Lenni, a young lesbian in the 2001 Italian crime film Gasoline.

== Selected filmography ==
- Ovosodo (1997)
- Gallo cedrone (1998)
- The Anto War (1999)
- Almost Blue (2000)
- The Last Kiss (2001)
- Gasoline (2001)
- Amici come prima (2018)
