= A spasso nel tempo – L'avventura continua =

- Directed by: Carlo Vanzina
- Written by: Carlo Vanzina; Enrico Vanzina
- Produced by: Aurelio De Laurentiis
- Starring: Christian De Sica; Massimo Boldi; Marco Messeri; Mariangela D'Abbraccio
- Release date: December 11, 1997
- Running time: 88 minutes
- Country: Italy
- Language: Italian

A spasso nel tempo – L'avventura continua (lit. 'Getting around in time: the adventure continues') is a 1997 Italian science fiction adventure comedy film directed by Carlo Vanzina. It is a sequel to 1996 film A spasso nel tempo.

== Cast ==
- Christian De Sica as Ascanio Orsini Varaldo/Maresciallo Amabile
- Massimo Boldi as Walter Boso/Antonio
- Marco Messeri as Lorenzo the Magnificent
- Mariangela D'Abbraccio as Sofia
- Gea Martire as Rosanna Orsini Varaldo
- Brando De Sica as Aspreno Orsini Varaldo
- Erica Beltrami as Gina
- Virginie Marsan as Giusy
- Sergio Solli as Don Gaetano
- Laura Valci as young Gina
- Renzo Rinaldi as Baccio
- Mercedes Ambrus as Baccio's wife
- Sergio Gibello as Girolamo Savonarola
- David J. Nicholls as Highlander
- Antonio Allocca as Don Peppino
- Nuccia Fumo as Nunziatina
