= Gallo cedrone =

1998 Italian comedy film

- Directed by: Carlo Verdone
- Written by: Carlo Verdone; Leonardo Benvenuti; Piero De Bernardi; Pasquale Plastino
- Produced by: Vittorio Cecchi Gori; Rita Rusić
- Starring: Carlo Verdone
- Cinematography: Danilo Desideri
- Edited by: Antonio Siciliano
- Music by: Fabio Liberatori
- Release date: October 16, 1998 (Italy)
- Running time: 94 minutes
- Country: Italy
- Language: Italian

Gallo cedrone (lit. 'Heather cock') is a 1998 Italian comedy film directed by Carlo Verdone.

== Cast ==
- Carlo Verdone as Armando Feroci
- Regina Orioli as Martina Saviotti
- Paolo Triestino as Franco Feroci
- Ines Nobili as Marcella Sesti-Feroci
- Enrica Rosso as Egle
- Giorgia Brugnoli as adult Morena
- Alessia Bruno as young Morena
- Roberto Mincuzzi as Quinto
- Maria Luisa Busi as herself
- Gina Rovere as the club's owner
- Albano Bufalini as Franco
- Gloria Sirabella as the hairdresser
- Mimmo Petrelli as Attilio
- Marcello Magnelli as Delio
- Costantino Valente as Dante
- Stefano Ambrogi as Romano
- Roberto Sbaratto as Doctor Bissanti
- Any Cerreto as Amelia
