= Faccione =

1991 Italian comedy film

- Directed by: Christian De Sica
- Written by: Christian De Sica; Filippo Ascione; Liliana Betti
- Produced by: Jacopo Capanna
- Starring: Nadia Rinaldi
- Cinematography: Sergio Salvati
- Edited by: Raimondo Crociani
- Music by: Manuel De Sica
- Release date: 31 January 1991 (Italy)
- Running time: 89 minutes
- Country: Italy
- Language: Italian

Faccione (lit. 'Big face') is a 1991 Italian comedy film directed by Christian De Sica.

== Cast ==
- Nadia Rinaldi as Daniela
- Paco Reconti as Michele Corrente
- Agnese Nano as Luisa
- Lucia Poli as Maria Pace
- John Francis Lane as Samuel
- Massimo Bonetti as Massimo
- Giovanni Visentin as Gianmario Lande
- Rosalina Neri as Osiride
- Antonello Fassari as Giuseppe, Daniela's brother
- Gianni Musy as Daniela and Giuseppe's father
- Raffaella Davi as Daniela and Giuseppe's mother
- Franca Scagnetti as Daniela and Giuseppe's granma
- Angelo Bernabucci as Daniela and Giuseppe's uncle
- Issa Seck as Mubu
- Paolo Paoloni as the gynecologist
- Claudia Lawrence as Lande's assistant
- Gina Rovere as the "caposala"
- Teresa Piergentili as Lina
- Giuliana Calandra as Marcella
- Enrica Bonaccorti as herself
- Roberto D'Agostino as himself
- Achille Bonito Oliva as himself
- Gepy Mariani as himself
- Luana Ravegnini as herself
