= Ricky & Barabba =

1992 Italian comedy film

- Directed by: Christian De Sica
- Written by: Alessandro Bencivenni; Leonardo Benvenuti; Paolo Costella; Piero De Bernardi; Christian De Sica; Domenico Saverni
- Story by: Filippo Ascione
- Produced by: Mario Cecchi Gori; Vittorio Cecchi Gori
- Starring: Renato Pozzetto; Christian De Sica
- Cinematography: Sergio Salvati
- Edited by: Raimondo Crociani
- Music by: Manuel De Sica
- Distributed by: Variety Distribution
- Release date: 19 December 1992 (Italy)
- Running time: 85 minutes
- Country: Italy
- Language: Italian

Ricky & Barabba is a 1992 Italian comedy film directed by Christian De Sica.

== Cast ==
- Renato Pozzetto as Ricky Morandi
- Christian De Sica as Barabba
- Francesca Reggiani as Elena Salvetti Morandi
- Franco Fabrizi as engineer Salvetti
- Bruno Corazzari as Sandro Bonetti
- Sylva Koscina as Cristina Bonetti
- Marisa Merlini as Marisa, Barabba's mother
- Stefania Calandra as Paloma
- Giovanni Lombardo Radice as the Director of Relais Hotel
