= The Black Cat (1981 film) =

1981 Italian horror film directed by Lucio Fulci

- Theatrical film poster
- Directed by: Lucio Fulci
- Screenplay by: Biagio Proietti; Lucio Fulci
- Story by: Biagio Proietti
- Based on: "The Black Cat"; 1843 story by Edgar Allan Poe
- Produced by: Giulio Sbarigia
- Starring: Patrick Magee; Mimsy Farmer; David Warbeck; Al Cliver
- Cinematography: Sergio Salvati
- Edited by: Vincenzo Tomassi
- Music by: Pino Donaggio
- Production company: Selenia Cinematografica S.r.l.
- Distributed by: Italian International Film
- Release date: 4 April 1981 (Italy)
- Running time: 92 minutes
- Country: Italy

The Black Cat (Italian: Black Cat: Gatto nero) is a 1981 Italian horror film directed by Lucio Fulci. Biagio Proietti co-wrote the screenplay with Fulci. It stars Patrick Magee, Mimsy Farmer, Al Cliver, David Warbeck, and Dagmar Lassander. The film is based loosely on the 1843 story of the same name by Edgar Allan Poe, and uses the violent style that typified the director's later career, following films like Don't Torture a Duckling (1972).

== Plot ==
In a small English village, a man driving a car encounters a black cat in the back seat. Through its stare, the cat causes the man to crash and die. The cat's owner is Robert Miles, a former college professor of the supernatural who is reputed to be a medium. Living alone in an old house, Miles regularly records audiotapes at the tombs of the recently deceased. Meanwhile, American tourist Jill Trevers enters an open crypt to photograph it for her scrapbook and discovers a microphone on the floor. Outside, she meets police constable Sergeant Wilson who tells her not to visit the crypt again.

At a boathouse, teenager Maureen Grayson and her boyfriend Stan lock themselves in an airtight room to have sex. They eventually lose the room's key, becoming trapped as the air begins to run out.

The following day, Lillian Grayson, Maureen's mother, calls the police to report her daughter's disappearance. Inspector Gorley from Scotland Yard is called into town. Meanwhile, Jill's search for the microphone's owner leads to Miles. The cat leaps and scratches Miles, preventing him from hypnotizing Jill, who flees.

That night, a man named Ferguson leaves a pub and walks home. The cat appears and scares him into a disused barn. Ferguson tries to escape the cat along a beam high off the ground. The cat scratches his hands. Failing to keep his balance, Ferguson falls to his death, landing on nearby spikes.

The next morning, Gorley asks Jill to help photograph the corpse. She complies, seeing scratches on Ferguson's hands like those suffered by Miles.

At Miles' house, Lillian begs him to help her find Maureen. Miles complies, having been romantically involved with Lillian years before. Holding a bracelet owned by Maureen, Miles enters a trance and describes the boathouse, and the location of the key. The police and Lillian find all as Miles said. Using the key to unlock the door, which was locked from the inside, they discover the bodies of Maureen and Stan. The key was outside the room, the only other way out of which was an air vent too small for a human. That night, Lillian dies in a fire started by the cat in her house.

Jill goes to Miles's house the following day and shows him photographs of the scratches on Ferguson's hands. Miles reveals that the cat exerts a supernatural influence over him.

That night, Miles drugs the cat and hangs it from a tree. Supernatural forces are unleashed by its death which hit Jill as she sleeps at the village inn. The cat appears before Miles again. Gorley visits Jill to discuss the flashes of light and occurrences that happened an hour earlier. While leaving, he sees the cat, which attacks and hypnotizes him. He staggers on the road in front of a moving car and gets run over.

The next day, Jill, still thinking that Miles is the real killer, sneaks into his house when he goes out and snoops around, uncovering recordings of his conversations with the dead. When Miles returns, she hides in the cellar, where the cat appears and disappears before her eyes. Fleeing in terror, she is cornered by Miles. The cat picked up on Miles's suppressed hatred for the townsfolk and is acting it out without his knowledge or control. Jill runs, but is attacked by bats in the cellar. Miles then knocks her out with a stick.

Jill wakes up bound and gagged while Miles walls her up alive in the cellar. He also took her keys and emptied her hotel room, making it seem that she left the village. Meanwhile, Gorley, having survived the car accident, goes with Wilson and his superior, Inspector Flynn, over to Miles' house and insists on searching it for signs of the cat and Jill. Finding nothing, they are about to leave when they hear a cry from the cat. At the cellar, they notice the newly bricked-up wall and batter it down, finding a barely alive Jill and the dead cat, which Miles accidentally incarcerated there. As Jill is pulled out, Miles mumbles to Gorley that the cat has won and that he has fallen victim to his own evil misdeeds.

== Cast ==
- Patrick Magee as Prof. Robert Miles
- Mimsy Farmer as Jill Trevers
- David Warbeck as Inspector Gorley
- Al Cliver as Sgt. Wilson
- Dagmar Lassander as Lillian Grayson
- Bruno Corazzari as Ferguson
- Geoffrey Copleston as Inspector Flynn
- Daniela Doria as Maureen Grayson (as Daniela Dorio)

== Production ==
The film's original shooting title was Il gatto di Park Lane (transl. "The Cat of Park Lane"). It was shot on location in the villages of West Wycombe, Chalfont St Giles and Hambleden, Buckinghamshire, and at film studios in Rome. Filming took place between 11 August and 28 September 1980.

== Release ==
The Black Cat was distributed theatrically in Italy by Italian International Film on April 4, 1981. It was released theatrically in the United States in February 1984.

The film has been released on DVD in America by Anchor Bay Entertainment on May 29, 2001 and Blue Underground and in the UK by Salvation Films and Shameless Screen Entertainment.

== Reception ==
Allmovie wrote, "As usual, [Fulci] conjures up a spooky atmosphere with effortless skill – a scene with Patrick Magee wandering through a fog-shrouded graveyard at night is truly creepy – but the film's meandering script makes it sputter when it should be building in intensity. Thus, The Black Cat never rises above being an exercise in style".
