= Annandrea Vitrano =

Italian actress and comedian

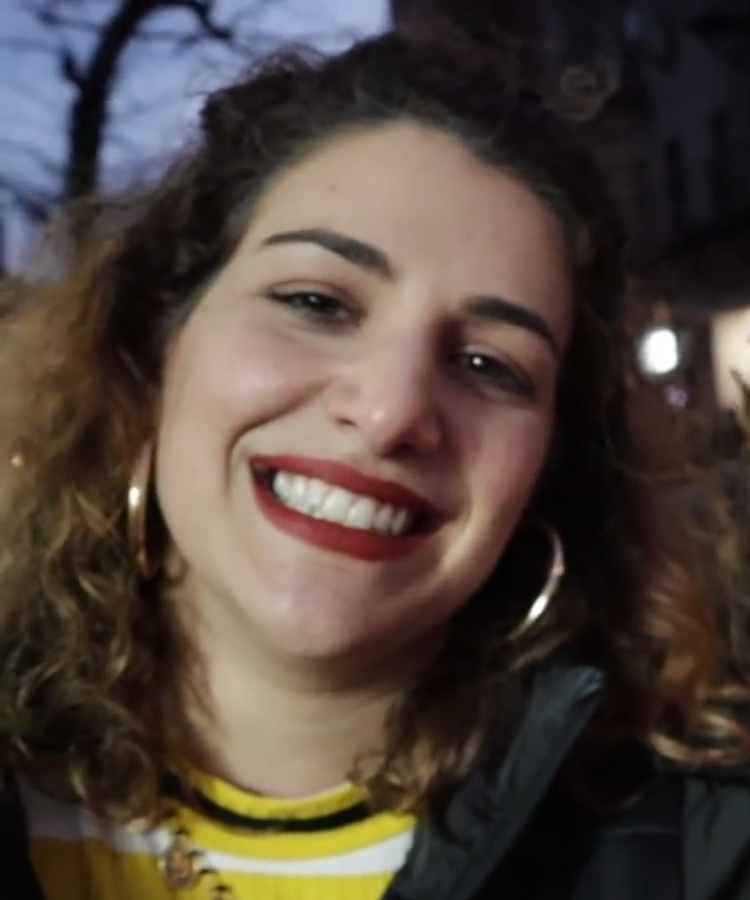
- Vitrano in 2020
- Born: 28 June 1988 (age 38); Misilmeri, Sicily, Italy
- Occupations: Actress; comedian; singer
- Years active: 2012–present
- Agent: Cristiana Baldassari
- Website: Official website

Annandrea Vitrano (born 28 June 1988) is an Italian actress, comedian and singer.

== Career ==
On 28 September 2012, Vitrano and her partner Claudio Casisa formed the comedy duo I Soldi Spicci. They participated at the "Taaac" comedy workshop in Palermo, and also attended the Zelig workshop in Rome and Milan in 2013. That same year, they hosted Spicciatevi, an entertainment radio program on Radio One. In September 2014, they made their television debut on the Italia 1's comedy show Colorado, and returned for its 2019 edition.

In 2018, the duo made their film debut with a leading role in the La fuitina sbagliata, for which they were also screenwriters. In 2019, they won the Benevento Cinema Televisione award as the revelation of the year in film. The following year, they competed in the reality show Pechino Express as the couple known as "The Palermitans". In September 2020, they began filming their second movie, Un mondo sotto social, where they served as both screenwriters and directors.

In 2023, Vitrano had a role in the film Nuovo Olimpo by Ferzan Özpetek. In 2024, she was part of the cast of the comedy Succede anche nelle migliori famiglie by Alessandro Siani.

== Filmography ==
=== Film ===
Year	Title	Role	Notes
2015	SmartLove		Short film
2018	La fuitina sbagliata	Anna Vitrano	
2022	Un mondo sotto social	Anna	
2023	Nuovo Olimpo	Laura	
2024	Succede anche nelle migliori famiglie	Rosalia	
2026	Cena di classe	Laura	

=== Television ===
Year	Title	Role(s)	Notes
2024	The Bad Guy	Crucy Suro	2 episodes

== Television programs ==
Year	Title	Role	Network	Notes
2014–2019	Colorado	Guest	Italia 1	7 episodes
2020	Pechino Express	Contestant	Rai 2	4 episodes
2022	Prova prova sa sa	Guest	Amazon Prime Video	Episode 2
