= Gasoline (film) =

2001 Italian crime film by Monica Stambrini

- Directed by: Monica Stambrini
- Written by: Anne Riitta Ciccone; Monica Stambrini; Elena Stancanelli
- Produced by: Galliano Juso
- Starring: Maya Sansa; Regina Orioli
- Cinematography: Fabio Cianchetti
- Edited by: Paola Freddi
- Music by: Massimo Zamboni
- Distributed by: Strand Releasing (US)
- Release date: 20 November 2001 (Italy)
- Running time: 90 minutes
- Country: Italy
- Language: Italian
- Box office: $4,307 (US sub total)

Gasoline (Italian: Benzina) is a 2001 Italian crime film directed by Monica Stambrini. It is based on a novel by Elena Stancanelli.

== Plot ==
A young lesbian couple, Stella and Lenni, go on the run after the accidental death of Lenni's mother.

== Cast ==
- Maya Sansa as Stella
- Regina Orioli as Lenni
- Mariella Valentini as Eleonora's mother
- Luigi Maria Burruano as Padre Gabriele (priest)
- Chiara Conti as Pippi
- Marco Quaglia as Sandro
- Pietro Ragusa as Filippo

== Reception ==
Gasoline was nominated for the Prize of the City of Torino at the 2001 Torino International Festival of Young Cinema and the Outstanding Film award at the 2004 GLAAD Media Awards.

Kevin Thomas, writing for the Los Angeles Times praised the lead actors but said the film was "too derivative and sensational for its own sake to work."
