= Un professore =

2021 Italian series broadcast

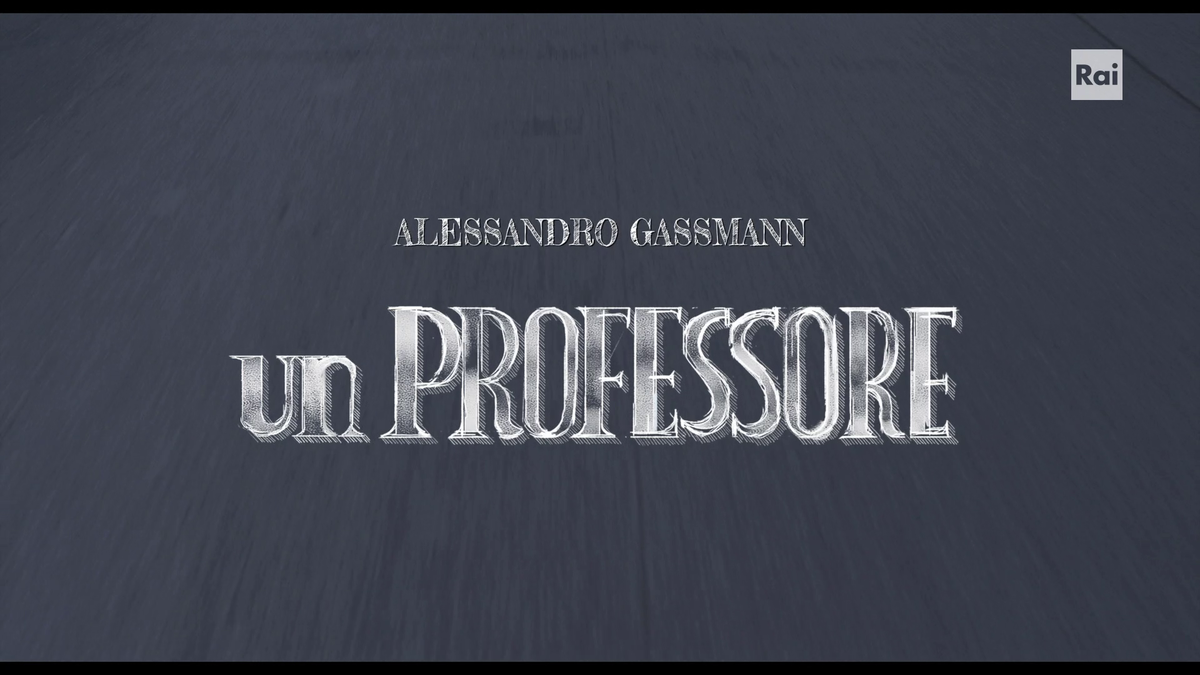
- Genre: Comedy-drama; Romantic comedy; Teen drama
- Based on: Merlí
- Written by: Sandro Petraglia; Valentina Gaddi; Sebastiano Melloni; Fidel Signorile
- Directed by: Alessandro D'Alatri (s01); Alessandro Casale (s02); Andrea Rebuzzi (s03)
- Starring: Alessandro Gassmann; Claudia Pandolfi; Nicolas Maupas; Damiano Gavino; Christiane Filangieri; Davide Divetta; Elisa Cocco; Luna Miriam Iansante; Beatrice De Mei; Simone Casanica; Francesca Colucci; Davide Mirti; Francesca Cavallin; Pia Engleberth; Domenico Cuomo; Khadim Faye; Margherita Aresti; Alice Lupparelli; Thomas Trabacchi; Tommaso Donadoni; Nicole Grimaudo; Dario Aita
- Music by: Francesco Gabbani; Riccardo Eberspacher (s01); Andrea Farri (s02-03)
- Opening theme: "Spazio tempo" by Francesco Gabbani
- Country of origin: Italy
- Original language: Italian
- No. of seasons: 3
- No. of episodes: 36

Production
- Producer: Massimo Del Frate
- Editors: Emiliano Bellardini (s01); Valentina Girodo (s02-03)
- Running time: 50–60 minutes
- Production company: Rai Fiction in collaboration with Banijay Studios Italy

Original release
- Network: Rai 1
- Release: 11 November 2021 – present

Un professore is an Italian teen comedy-drama television series broadcast in primetime on Rai 1 from 11 November 2021.

Un professore is partly based on the format of the Catalan series Merlí. It is directed by Alessandro D'Alatri in the first season, by Alessandro Casale in the second season and by Andrea Rebuzzi in the third season, produced by Rai Fiction in collaboration with Banijay Studios Italy and stars Alessandro Gassmann.

== Plot ==
=== Season one ===
Dante Balestra is the new philosophy teacher at the Leonardo da Vinci scientific high school in Rome, where he has returned after an eight-year absence to be with his son, Simone, now that Floriana, his ex-wife, is moving to Glasgow. Charming and unconventional, the professor takes a class at the Leonardo da Vinci High School where he applies his non-conformist teaching method and establishes a very special relationship with his pupils, including Simone himself. But his manner soon leads to confusing private life with professional life, and the return from the past of Anita, an old acquaintance of his and mother of Manuel, the 'black sheep' of the class, makes things even more complicated.

=== Season two ===
Professor Dante Balestra is now an indispensable presence in the lives of his students, among whom is his son Simone. The beating heart of the series remains the Leonardo da Vinci high school, with the class attended by Simone and Manuel (Anita's son), where Dante, with his usual non-conformist and ingenious flair, uses philosophy to help the boys solve their problems, including complicated love affairs, intrusive parents, daydreams and dashed hopes.

New class members appear in this season, such as Nina, a girl of Polish origin who hides a complicated life path, Rayan, a promising footballer who has arrived from Africa and is more interested in football than in studying, Viola, a disabled girl with an impossible character, and finally Mimmo, a former student of Dante's who ended up in juvenile prison, whom the professor has managed to get committed to the Leonardo da Vinci library in semi-freedom.

=== Season three ===
It's the final year of high school for class 5°B, and as the graduation exams approach, everyone is trying to figure out their future. Professor Balestra is still there, guided by philosophy, but his life remains chaotic: forced to move in with his son Simone at nonna Virginia's house, Dante must face an angry teenager, an unresolved love story, and a past that resurfaces in the form of Leone, a former student now colleague who brings back a mystery involving Alba, a former student with a troubled past. Alongside Anita, the new English substitute teacher, the school also welcomes Irene, the new principal and mother of rebellious teenager Greta. Together with the newcomers Thomas and Zeno, she will shake up the class dynamics and join the journey toward graduation alongside Viola, Nina, Matteo, Laura, Luna, Simone, and Manuel.

== Episodes ==
Season	Episodes	Italian airing
1	12	2021
2	12	2023
3	12	2025

== Cast ==
=== Main characters ===
- Dante Balestra (season 1-present), played by Alessandro Gassmann. He is the philosophy teacher of Class 3ª B. An unconventional, eccentric, and womanizing man, yet fundamentally kind-hearted, he is deeply committed to his students and does not shy away from addressing even the most challenging cases. He has a strained relationship with his son, Simone, due to his prolonged absence from the family. In the finale of the first season, he is compelled to reveal a long-hidden secret: Simone had a twin brother, Jacopo, who died at the age of three from meningitis. The grief resulting from the loss led to the breakdown of Dante and Floriana's marriage. Although Simone initially reacts with anger, the two eventually reconcile. During the second season, in addition to various romantic difficulties, he faces a serious health issue caused by an arteriovenous malformation. Confronted with the symptoms of the condition and the potential cognitive and motor risks associated with surgery, Dante must decide whether to undergo the operation. He also betrays Anita with Floriana, though the situation is resolved by the end of the season. In the third season, he and Anita are no longer together, having mutually agreed to separate despite still loving each other. They later reconcile after Anita discovers she is pregnant.
- Anita Ferro (season 1-present), played by Claudia Pandolfi. She is Manuel's mother, whom Dante had met years earlier at the hospital during the period when Jacopo was ill. She raised her son on her own and is portrayed as a gentle and somewhat melancholic woman. Owing to her experiences abroad, she has a strong command of foreign languages. She begins a relationship with Dante and, in the second season, temporarily moves to Villa Balestra with her son Manuel. Following the return of a former partner, Nicola, she enters a period of profound emotional uncertainty and has an affair with him. She later reconciles with Dante and resumes their relationship. In the third season, she serves as a substitute English teacher for the fifth-year class, becoming both Dante's colleague and Manuel's teacher. She discovers that she is pregnant with Dante's child and, in the season finale, gives birth to a daughter, Barbara.
- Simone Balestra (season 1-present), played by Nicolas Maupas. He is a student in Class 3ª B and Dante's son, with whom he has a strained relationship. Outwardly, he appears to be a quiet and composed boy; however, he is deeply insecure and unsettled by the discovery of new aspects of his life and identity. After realizing that he is gay, he ends his relationship with Laura and develops romantic feelings for Manuel, with whom he later establishes a close, brotherly friendship. Upon learning that he had a twin brother, Jacopo, who died in early childhood, he attempts suicide but is rescued by Manuel and Anita. In the second season, he forms a deep bond with Mimmo, a former student of Dante, eventually falling in love with him and beginning an intense relationship. The two are forced to separate when Mimmo enters a witness protection program. When Dante must undergo surgery, he struggles with the fear of losing him, at one point getting drunk; however, following the successful operation, father and son reconcile. In the third season, although still in love with Mimmo, he begins a complicated relationship with Thomas, which ultimately ends. He also develops a significant friendship with Greta. In the season finale, he becomes Barbara's older brother and leaves to study in London, followed by Manuel.
- Manuel Ferro (season 1-present), played by Damiano Gavino. He is a repeating student in Class 3ª B and Anita's son. Regarded as the “hopeless case” of the class, he presents himself as strong and self-assured, while in reality concealing a fundamentally kind nature. At the beginning of the series, he is in a relationship with Chicca, whom he cheats on with Alice, an architect and a friend of his mother. Following initial tensions, he develops a brotherly bond with Simone. He becomes involved in dangerous criminal activities orchestrated by Sbarra, a local criminal, but ultimately manages to extricate himself with Dante's help. In the second season, he falls in love with and begins a relationship with Nina, and moves with his mother to Villa Balestra. He learns the truth about his father and discovers that he has a sister, Viola, with whom he subsequently builds a sibling relationship. Together with Nina, he attempts to flee to Paris with Lilli, Nina's daughter, in order to prevent her adoptive parents from finding her, but the plan fails. In the third season, he asks Nina to marry him to prevent her from losing custody of her daughter; however, they later separate after she has an affair with Goran, Lilli's father. Disappointed, he decides to leave Rome and travel for several weeks, also spending time with his father in Japan. Upon his return, he shows interest in Greta, though no romantic relationship develops at her request. In the season finale, he becomes Barbara's older brother and decides to follow Simone to London.
- Domenico "Mimmo" Bruni (recurring season 1, season 2), played by Domenico Cuomo. He is a young inmate at the juvenile detention centre in Nisida and a former student of Dante, to whom he is deeply attached. Outgoing and full of vitality, he retains his kindness toward others despite his troubled past. In the second season, he is transferred to Rome, where he is granted semi-liberty and, with Dante's support, begins working as a library assistant at the high school. There, he meets Simone, and the two develop a very close bond that eventually evolves into an intense romantic relationship. In exchange for protection, the criminal Molosso coerces him into working on his behalf. Encouraged by Simone and frightened by the boss's threats, he ultimately decides to cooperate with the authorities, reporting Molosso and his associates. As a result of his testimony, which leads to the arrest of several criminals, he is placed in a witness protection program and required to change his identity and relocate, leading to a painful farewell with Simone.
- Floriana (season 1–2), played by Christiane Filangieri. She is a university researcher, the mother of Simone, and the former wife of Dante. At the beginning of the first season, she moves to Glasgow, where Simone joins her for a brief period and comes out to her. In the second season, feeling the absence of Simone and following a romantic breakup, she returns to Villa Balestra for a short time. During her stay, she learns of Dante's health condition and attempts to persuade him to undergo surgery. They later share a night of intimacy but ultimately recognize it as a mistake and agree not to resume their relationship.
- Virginia Villa (season 1-present), played by Pia Engleberth. She is a former stage actress, as well as Dante's mother and Simone's grandmother. She directs a theatre workshop at Leonardo da Vinci High School, alongside Professor Lombardi, with whom she develops a romantic relationship. Energetic, exuberant, occasionally comedic, and capable of great warmth, she was not an ideal mother to Dante in her youth but has since become his most devoted and affectionate confidante. In the season three finale, she moves in with Professor Lombardi.
- Laura (season 1-present), played by Elisa Cocco. She is a student in Class 3ª B. Sweet, cultured, and intelligent, she is recognized as the top-performing student in her class. She is Luna's best friend and, at the beginning of the first season, Simone's girlfriend. After Simone ends their relationship, she pretends to be pregnant but is later exposed. Despite this, they remain close friends. Subsequently, she begins exchanging emails with a boy known as The Pen. By the end of the first season, she discovers that The Pen is her classmate Pin, and the two share a kiss. Although they are separated due to attending different schools, they continue to communicate via social media in the second season, though their relationship eventually ends off-screen. In the second season, she learns that Luna is involved in an online relationship and, recognizing the potential danger, accompanies her to the meeting to supervise her, also notifying Dante, who, together with Simone and Manuel, rescues Luna. At the end of the season, she shares a kiss with Matteo. In the third season, she enters a polyamorous relationship with Luna and Matteo, facilitating a closer connection between the two at her own expense.
- Luna (season 1-present), played by Luna Miriam Iansante. She is a student in Class 3ª B. Cheerful and outgoing yet deeply insecure, she is Laura's best friend. She develops a crush on Matteo and, upon discovering that he has been intimate with Chicca, temporarily ends her friendship with Chicca before reconciling. She later begins a relationship with a boy named Angelo, who is revealed to be the son of Professor Franco De Angelis, but the relationship ends when he breaks up with her. In the second season, she communicates online with a stranger and, during their in-person meeting, becomes the target of an attempted sexual assault. She is rescued by Dante, Simone, and Manuel, who were alerted beforehand by Laura. In the third season, she enters a polyamorous relationship with Laura and Matteo, ultimately developing romantic interest in her friend's partner.
- Matteo (season 1-present), played by Davide Divetta. He is a student in Class 3ª B. Outgoing and quick-witted, he is regarded as the most humorous member of the class, though beneath his cheerful demeanour, he conceals insecurities and personal challenges. A passionate enthusiast of theatre, he has a brief romantic involvement with Chicca in the first season. In the second season, he develops a crush on Laura, initially unreciprocated, and shares a kiss with her in the season finale. In the third season, he considers entering a romantic relationship with both Laura and Luna, ultimately choosing to pursue a relationship with Luna.
- Chicca (season 1), played by Francesca Colucci. A student in 3°B class, she is an eccentric and energetic girl, lively, restless and very good at drawing. She is Manuel's girlfriend, but when she finds out about the latter's betrayal, with a girl twice his age, she starts flirting with Matteo. It is revealed in the second season that she moved to an artistic high school to chase her talent.
- Monica Altieri (season 1), played by Beatrice De Mei. She is a new student in 3°B. She left her old school because of her ex-boyfriend. She's kind, polite, intelligent and likes to read. She is in a relationship with Giulio.
- Giulio Palmieri (season 1), played by Simone Casanica. He is a student in 3°B class, considered the most serious in the class. Very shy and reserved, he is the son of a rich lawyer. In the course of time, he manages to open up and express himself, even overcoming his father's oppression. He has a relationship with Monica.
- Giuseppe "Pin" Palombo (season 1), played by Alessio De Lorenzi. He is a student in the 3°B class. He abandoned school because of the bullying he was a victim of, but Dante will help him overcome his inhibition. It is revealed that he's "The Pen", the boy with whom Laura was e-mailing. In the second season, it is revealed that he moved to Siena with his mother.
- Aureliano (season 1), played by Davide Mirti. He is a student in the 3°B class and Cecilia's son. An extroverted boy, cheerful and friendly. He interposes himself between Monica and Giulio, trying to win her over, in vain.
- Cecilia (season 1), played by Francesca Cavallin. She is Aureliano's mother and parental representative. Separated from her husband, she briefly enters into a relationship with Dante.
- Rayan (season 2), played by Khadim Faye. Newcomer to Dante's class. He's an African boy with a great passion for football. He wants to become a footballer, in honour of a promise he made to his now deceased brother. He seems to take life lightly, but in reality, hides great depth. He starts a relationship with Viola.
- Nina Mazur (season 2–3), played by Margherita Aresti. She is another new student in the class, of Polish origin. Outgoing and fond of reading, she has a two-year-old daughter, Lilli, who was later placed with foster parents following a dangerous incident. She begins a relationship with Manuel and, although she initially accepts his marriage proposal, she has an affair with Goran, Lilli's father. In the third season, she relocates permanently to Perugia with Lilli and Goran.
- Viola Brandi (season 2-present), played by Alice Lupparelli. She is the daughter of Nicola and is characterized by a strong-willed and determined personality. Left disabled following a traffic accident, she became withdrawn, relying on her sharp intellect as a coping mechanism. She is revealed to be Manuel's half-sister, as she is Nicola's daughter. Through her interactions with new classmates, particularly Manuel and Rayan, she begins a process of coming to terms with and accepting her disability. In the third season, she develops an unrequited crush on the new physics teacher but ultimately enters a relationship with Zeno. She attempts to gain admission to a prestigious American university, but is unsuccessful. Following the formalization of the relationship between Dante, her teacher, and Anita, her stepmother, she also becomes the half-sister of Barbara and Simone.
- Nicola Brandi (season 2), played by Thomas Trabacchi. He is an old flame of Anita's as well as Viola's father. A successful manager who travels a lot, precisely due to his job. His return to Rome will wreak havoc both in Anita and Manuel's lives and in his own as he discovers that he is Viola's father.
- Irene Alessi (season 3-present), played by Nicole Grimaudo. She is Greta's mother and the new principal of the school. She engages in a brief romantic involvement with Dante at the gym. She has a turbulent relationship with her daughter and frequently clashes with Dante.
- Leone Rocci (season 3-present), played by Dario Aita. He is the new physics teacher and a former student of Dante.
- Greta Rivalta (season 3-present), played by Giulia Fazzini. She is a new student in Dante's class, able to hold her own in interactions with him, and the daughter of Principal Irene Alessi, with whom she has a turbulent relationship. She forms a close friendship with Simone.
- Zeno Lulli (season 3-present), played by Filippo Brogi. He is a new student in Dante's class, having previously been educated through homeschooling. He falls in love with Viola, and by the season finale, the two confess their mutual feelings. From the outset, he is portrayed as eccentric and distinctive. He chose to attend school independently, as he is of legal age and his parents oppose the traditional educational system.
- Tommaso “Thomas” Valeri (season 3-present), played by Tommaso Donadoni. He is a new student in Dante's class and was Simone's best friend in middle school, with whom he shared many adventures. He later moved to Switzerland after his father secured a new job. He begins an on-and-off romantic relationship with Simone, which ends permanently in the season finale due to Thomas relocating to Treviso to be with his ill father.

=== Recurring characters ===
- Felice 'Sbarra' Proietti (season 1), played by Loris Loddi. He is a criminal who runs a junkyard and a drug ring.
- 'Zucca' (season 1), played by Andrea Giannini. He is Sbarra's henchman.
- Ettore (season 1), played by Paolo Conticini. He is an old flame of Anita's and, for a period, her employer.
- Alice Torresi (season 1), played by Margherita Laterza. She's a young architect with whom Manuel falls in love; she is separated from her husband and has a son.
- Marina Girolami (season 1-present), played by Sara Cardinaletti. She is the mathematics teacher; she has a brief flirtation with Dante only to be his friend. She supports Luna after the girl's attempted violence.
- Franco De Angelis (season 1-present), played by Giorgio Gobbi. He is the Italian professor.
- Attilio Lombardi (season 1-present), played by Paolo Bessegato. He is the Latin teacher. Rather cynical and severe, he very often offends and mocks the boys; he embodies the "old-fashioned" professor, more interested in dispensing negative evaluations and proposing failures than in the education and growth of the boys. He clashes several times with Dante. Together with Virginia, he directs a drama laboratory within the school.
- Agata Smeriglio (season 1–2), played by Federica Cifola. She is the principal of the school and an old friend of Dante's.
- Irene Alessi (season 3), played by Nicole Grimaudo. She's the new principal of the school.
- Lino Battaglia (season 1), played by Andrea Preti. He is the physical education teacher.
- Grazia Morelli (season 1-present), played by Francesca Romana De Martini. She is the art professor and the wife of Franco De Angelis.
- Professor Stagno (season 1-present), played by Francesca Farcomeni. She is the science teacher.
- Professor Testa (season 1-present), played by Valentina Illuminati. She is the English teacher.
- Egidio (season 1-present), played by Flavio Domenici. He is the school caretaker.
- Pantera (season 1-present), played by Mirko Frezza. He is an anti-crime cop and a long-time friend of Dante's.
- Molosso (season 2), played by Pio Stellaccio. A boss cellmate of Mimmo's. He forces Mimmo to collect the payoff, taking advantage of the boy's semi-freedom.
- Palommo (season 2), played by Simone Borrelli. He is Molosso's trusted cousin whom Mimmo has arrested.
- Ernesto Poggi (season 2), played by Andrea Verticchio. He is a fifth-grade bully who ends up in a coma after being attacked by Mimmo, in the latter's attempt to defend Simone from a homophobic attack.
- Lollo and Balbo (season 2), respectively played by Michele Capuano and Gabriele Santolin. Fifth-grade bullies and Ernesto's friends.
- Fragoroso (season 2), played by Riccardo Morgante. He is a friend of Manuel's who will help him and Anita with the move to Dante's house.
- Ardenzi (season 2), played by Enzo Provenzano. He is the elderly owner of the bookstore where Anita works.
- Elsa Paternò (season 2), played by Chiara Ricci. She is a doctor and an old acquaintance of Dante's. She is the one to inform Dante of his arterio-venous malformation.
- Sonia Ruffini (season 2), played by Clio Cipolletta. She is the social worker in charge of Nina's daughter.
- Lilli (season 2–3), played by Sofia Maria Bocu. She is the daughter of Nina and Goran.
- Goran (season 3), played by Radu Murarasu. He is Nina's former boyfriend, who reconnects with her upon his release from prison.
- Alba (season 3-present), played by Rita Castaldo. She is a former student of Dante's who is employed at Anita's bookstore, where he attempts to help rehabilitate her due to her struggles with drug addiction.
- Alba's drug dealer (season 3), played by Vincenzo Crivello.
- Alba's drug dealer #2 (season 3), played by Alessandro Tirocchi.
- Zeno's parents (season 3), played by Evita Ciri and Fabrizio Sabatucci.
- Father Astolfo (season 3), played by Fabio Balsamo. He is the guide of the Abbey of Montecassino.
- State Exam Board President (season 3), played by Bruno Santini.

== Differences with Merlì ==
Although partially inspired by the Catalan series Merlí, Un Professore presents several differences compared to the original:

- In Merlí, Pol lives with his father and brother Oscar at his grandmother's house. Manuel, the Italian counterpart of Pol, lives with his mother Anita, while Pol's mother has died before the series begins.
- In the Italian version, Anita and Dante begin a romantic relationship, which does not occur in Merlí. As a result, in the original series, there is no instance where Pol moves in with Merlí, whereas Manuel and Anita move in with Dante.
- At the end of Merlí, through a time jump, it is revealed that Pol and Bruno have married. In Un Professore, the relationship between Simone (the Italian counterpart of Bruno) and Manuel develops into a deep, brotherly friendship, characterised by mutual support, eventually becoming stepbrothers at the end of the third season following the birth of Barbara.
- In Merlí, Pol explores his bisexuality, an aspect that is not represented in the Italian counterpart, Manuel, but represented instead by Mimmo and, especially, Thomas.
- Mimmo's sexuality is not explicitly explored in the series, leaving his sexual orientation undefined; although he enters into a relationship with Simone, he has previously shown interest in women.
- There is also a character named Nicola in Merlí, but while in Un Professore he is Anita's ex and Manuel's father, in the original series, he is the Italian guy Bruno meets during a vacation, with whom he will live in Italy for a while.
- In the Catalan series, Pol and Bruno temporarily separate when Pol leaves for Tokyo with his father. In the Italian version, it is Simone and Mimmo who separate, due to Mimmo entering the witness protection program.
- The characters of Luna and Laura are partially inspired by Tania Illa, Bruno's best friend. In Un Professore, Tania's personality and physical appearance are assigned to Luna, while the friendship with Simone (a relationship that precedes his coming out) is represented through Laura. Like Tania, Luna is in love with Matteo, the character inspired by Marc Vilaseca.
- The love triangle between Aureliano, Monica, and Giulio is more developed in Merlí through the characters of Gerard, Monica, and Joan. The latter shares Giulio's family situation, although his actions correspond to those of Aureliano, as he will be the one to intervene between Monica and Gerard, and have a relationship with Monica, just like Giulio. In contrast, Gerard is the son of Gina, a parents’ representative with whom Merlí has a relationship, similar to Dante with Cecilia, Aureliano's mother. Unlike Dante, whose brief relationship with Cecilia is only present in the first season. In Un Professore, all these characters, including Cecilia, leave the scene after the first season, while they remain throughout the entire original series.
- Pin, a boy who has agoraphobia following bullying, is inspired by Ivan. Unlike Ivan, who appears throughout the series, Pin only appears in the first season.
- Chicca changes schools at the end of the first season to pursue her artistic talent. This does not happen to her Catalan counterpart, Berta. Additionally, Berta pretends to be pregnant when Pol leaves her, whereas in the remake, Laura does the same when Simone leaves her, though Simone is Bruno's counterpart, not Pol's.
- Nina is inspired by the character Oksana. However, unlike Nina, who loses custody of her daughter Lilli, Oksana raises her son Nil with her parents. Moreover, while Nina enters into a relationship with Manuel, Oksana will date Oscar, Pol's brother.

== Production ==
The series is produced by Rai Fiction in collaboration with Banijay Studios Italy.

The filming of the first season took place in Rome: some scenes were shot in Civitavecchia at the Grotta Aurelia bathing establishment and at the villaggio del fanciullo. Some scenes were filmed inside the Giovanni Battista Grassi Museum of Comparative Anatomy of the Sapienza University of Rome.

After the great success of the first season, the series was renewed for a second season. Its filming began in February 2023 and ended in July of the same year, always in Rome. Much of the filming was shot in the Monti district. The school where Dante teaches is the Leonardo da Vinci high school, while the bookstore where Anita works is Libreria Panisperna 220.

On 22 December 2023, the series was renewed for a third season, filming is scheduled to begin in February 2025.

It was recently announced that Nicole Grimaudo, Dario Aita, and Rita Castaldo joined the cast of the third season.

== Distribution ==
The series has been aired in prime time on Rai 1 since 11 November 2021: the first season ran from 11 November to 16 December 2021, while the second season ran from 23 November to 21 December 2023. It has been stated that the third season will air in 2025.

== Soundtrack ==
The theme song is called Spazio Tempo (Space Time) and it is sung by Francesco Gabbani. In season two the track Dammi un bacio ja' (Come on give me a kiss), sung by Leo Gassman, joins the soundtrack of the series.

== Awards ==
- 2022
  - Special Nastro d'argento Award to Alessandro Gassmann.
- 2024
  - Biagio Agnes Award to the series in the Fiction category.
  - Nastro d'Argento Award to the second season in the Dramedy category.
  - Nomination at Nastri d'argento for Claudia Pandolfi and Thomas Trabacchi respectively in the Best Leading Actress and Best Supporting Actor categories.
  - Ciak d'oro for Nicolas Maupas in the Best Performance for audience under 30 category in the second season.
  - Nomination at Ciak d'oro for Domenico Cuomo and Margherita Aresti in the Best Performance for audience under 30 category in the second season.
  - Nomination at Ciak d'oro for Alessandro Gassman in the Best Italian Actor category
  - Nomination at Ciak d'oro for the second season in the Best Series for Audience under 30 category.
  - Adolfo Celi Award to the series.
  - Nomination at the SIAE Music Awards in the Best Soundtrack category (TV Series and Streaming TV Series).
