= Dettelbach =

- Town
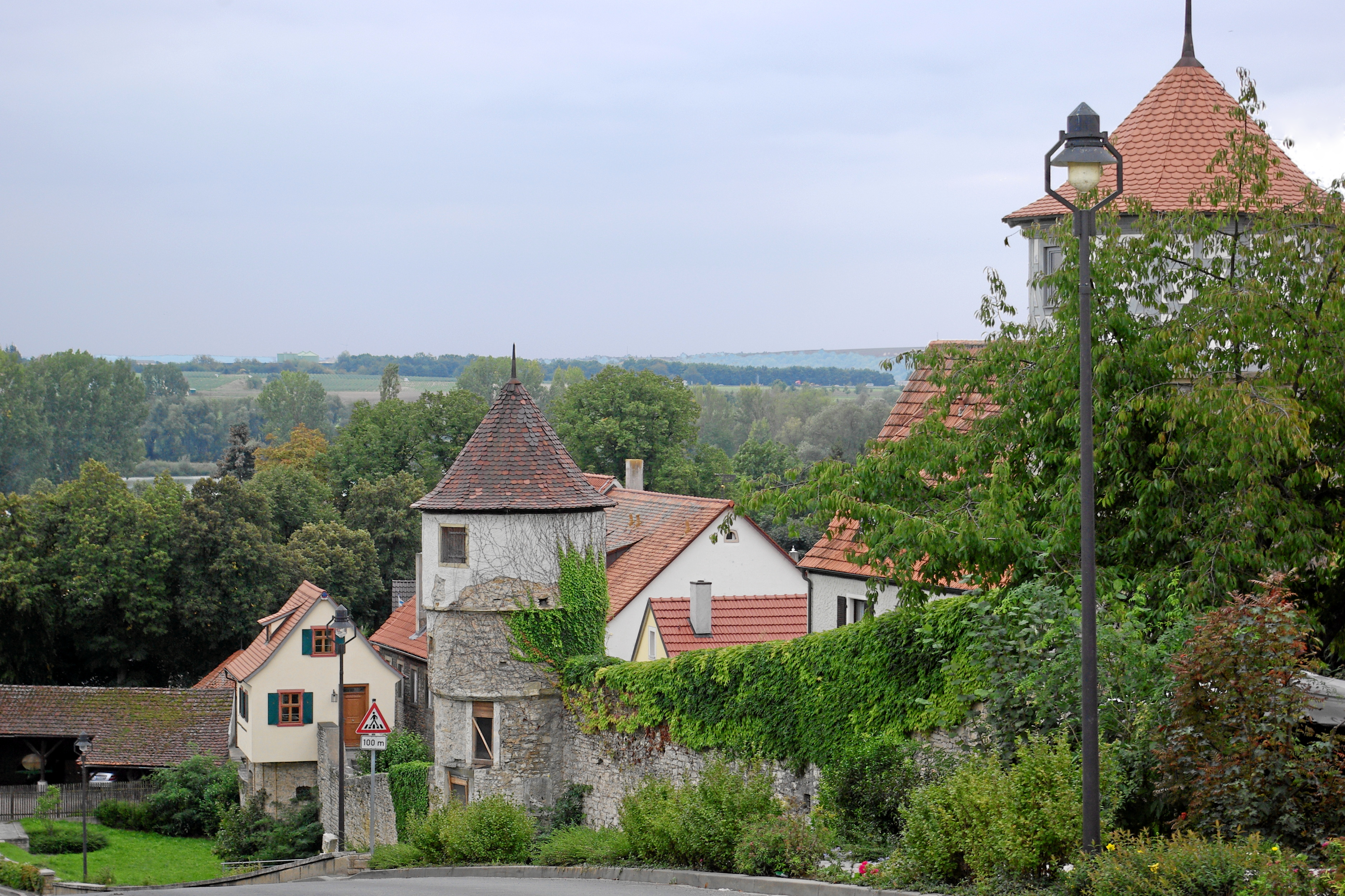
- Remaining town fortifications

- Coat of arms

- Location of Dettelbach within Kitzingen district
- Interactive map of Dettelbach
- Location within Germany Location within Bavaria
- Coordinates: 49°48′N 10°11′E
- Country: Germany
- State: Bavaria
- Admin. region: Unterfranken
- District: Kitzingen
- Subdivisions: 10 Stadtteile

Government
  - Mayor (2020–26): Matthias Bielek (FW)

Area
  - Total: 60.94 km^{2} (23.53 sq mi)
- Elevation: 189–230 m (620–755 ft)

Population (2025-12-31)
  - Total: 6,890
  - Density: 113/km^{2} (293/sq mi)
- Time zone: UTC+01:00 (CET)
  - Summer (DST): UTC+02:00 (CEST)
- Postal codes: 97337
- Dialling codes: 09324
- Vehicle registration: KT
- Website: www.dettelbach.de

Dettelbach (German: [ˈdɛtl̩ˌbax]) is a town in the district of Kitzingen in the Regierungsbezirk Unterfranken in Bavaria, Germany. It is situated on the right bank of the Main, 20 km east of Würzburg, and 8 km north of Kitzingen. It includes neighboring villages as administrative subdivisions, namely Bibergau, Brück, Dettelbach-Bahnhof, Effeldorf, Euerfeld, Mainsondheim, Neuses am Berg, Neusetz, Schernau und Schnepfenbach.

Dettelbach was first mentioned as a settlement in 741 AD. "Stadtrecht" town privileges were granted in 1484 AD. Dettelbach has a nearly complete medieval city wall that includes towers and two remaining town gates. Dettelbach's most prominent architectural features are cobble-stoned streets with picturesque rows of half-timbered houses, and historic buildings dating as far back as the Renaissance, or even late-Gothic era.

Dettelbach is famous for its wine, available from a number of local wineries. One major tourist attraction is the annual wine fest in the heart of downtown. The festival takes place every year from the Catholic Feast of Corpus Christi to the Sunday following the holiday. A local specialty are "Muskatzinen," flavorful pastries spiced with nutmeg, made after a secret recipe.

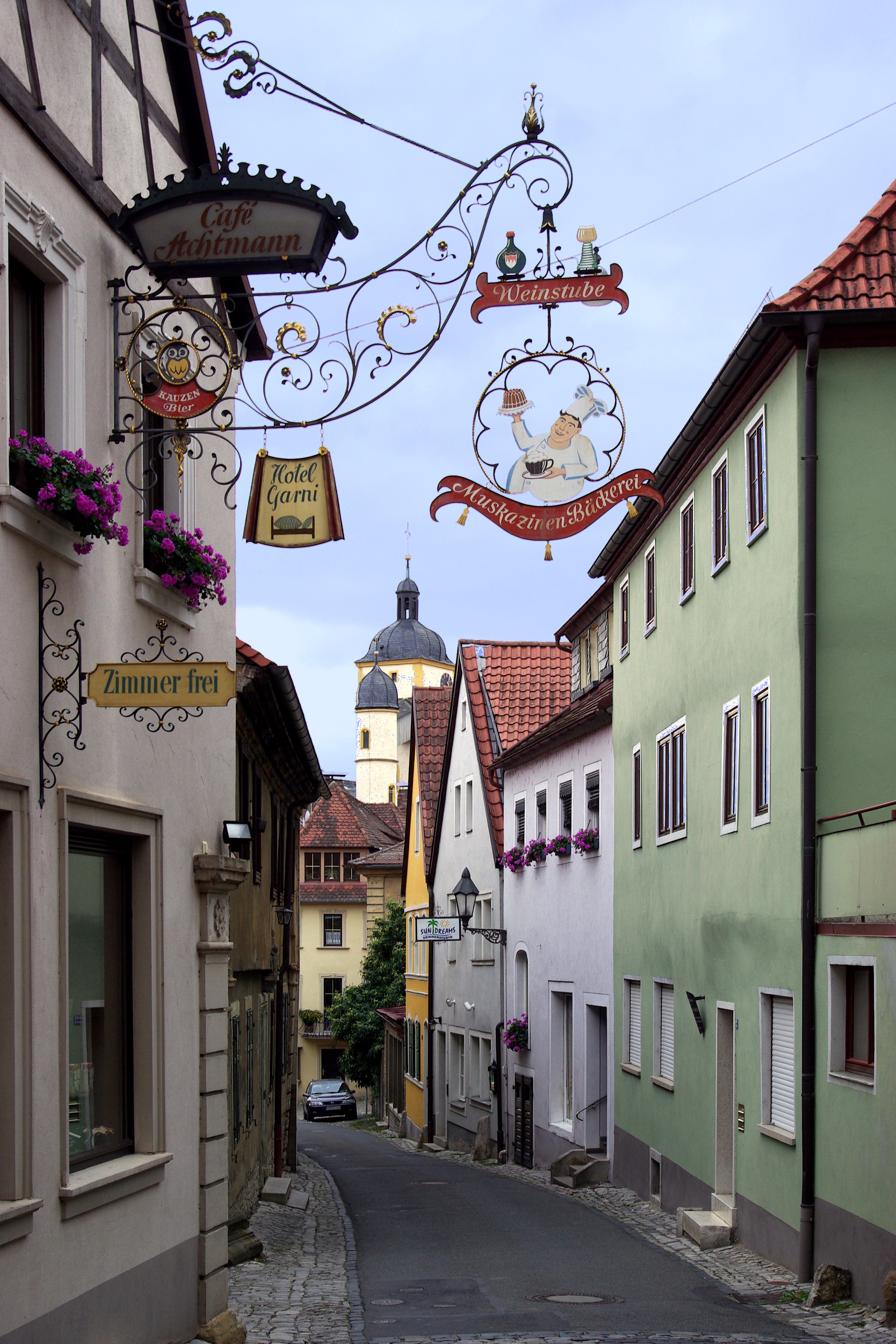

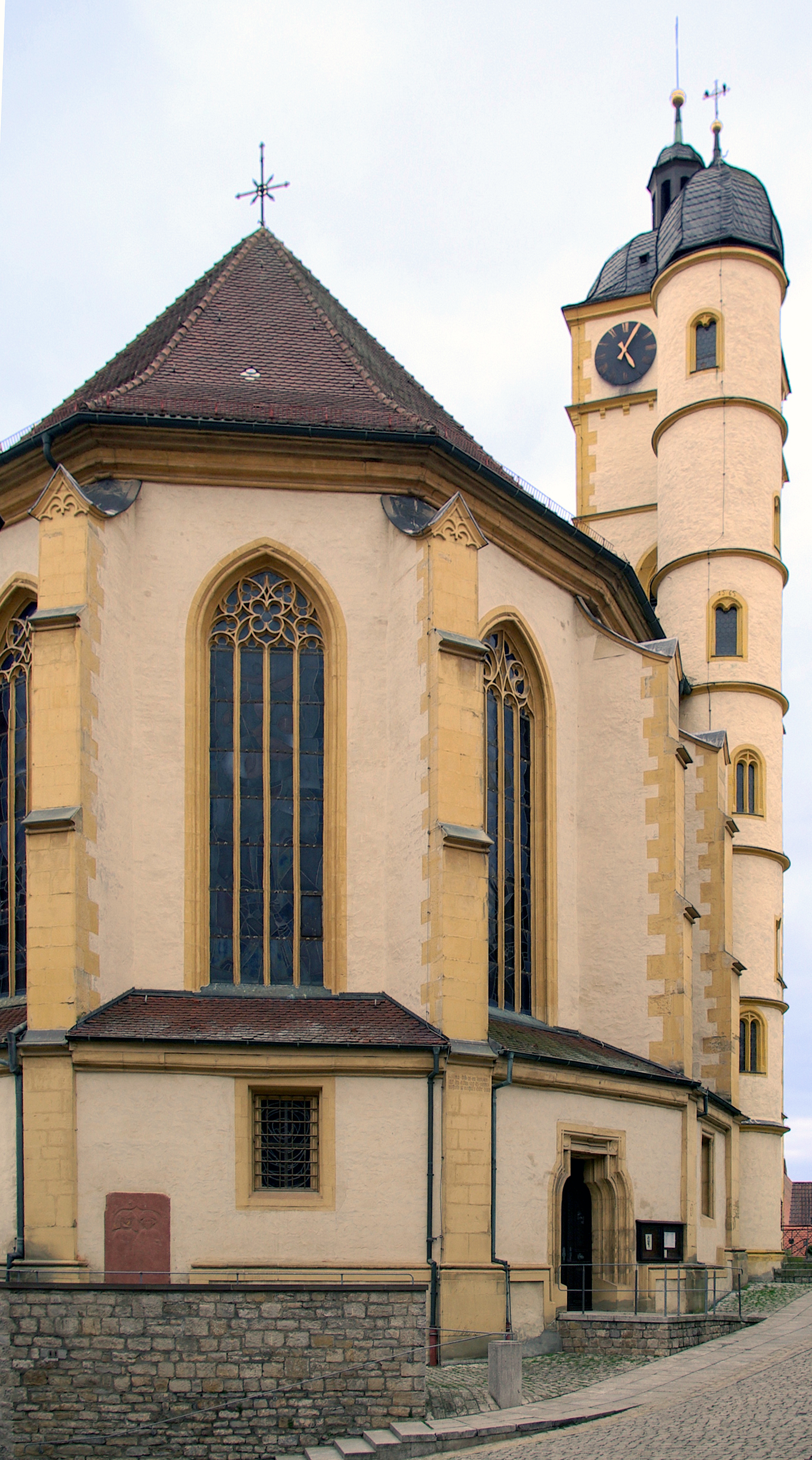

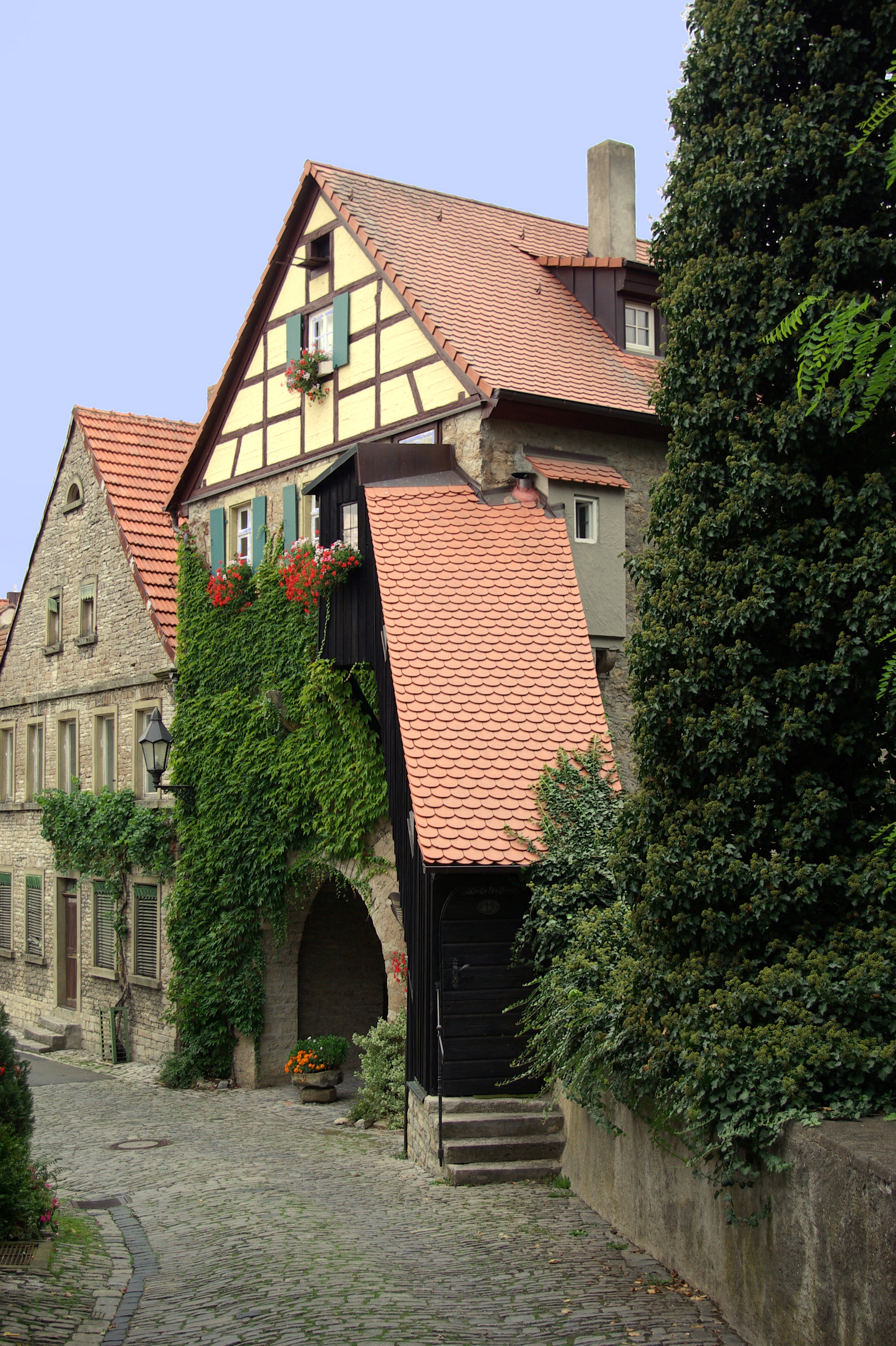

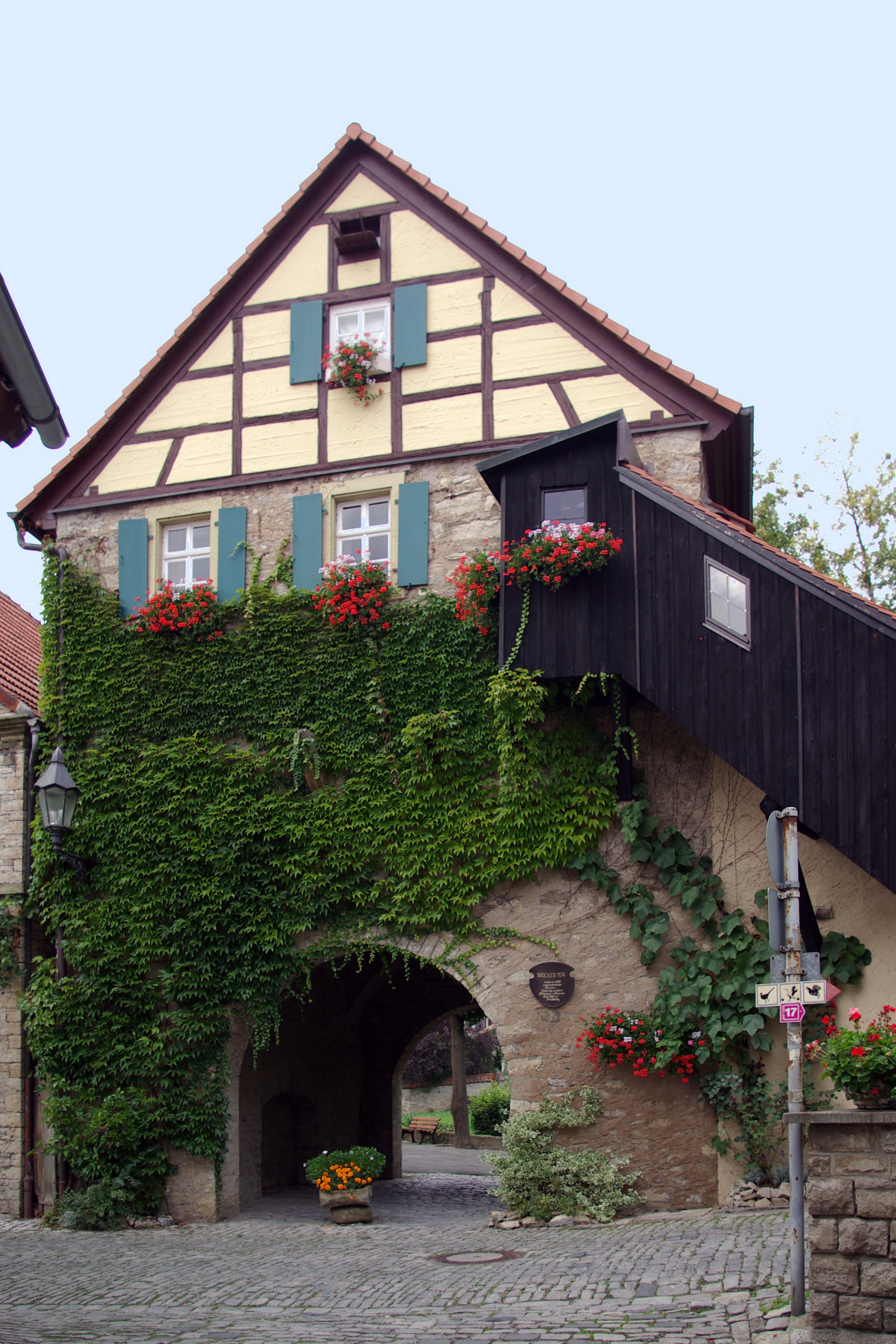

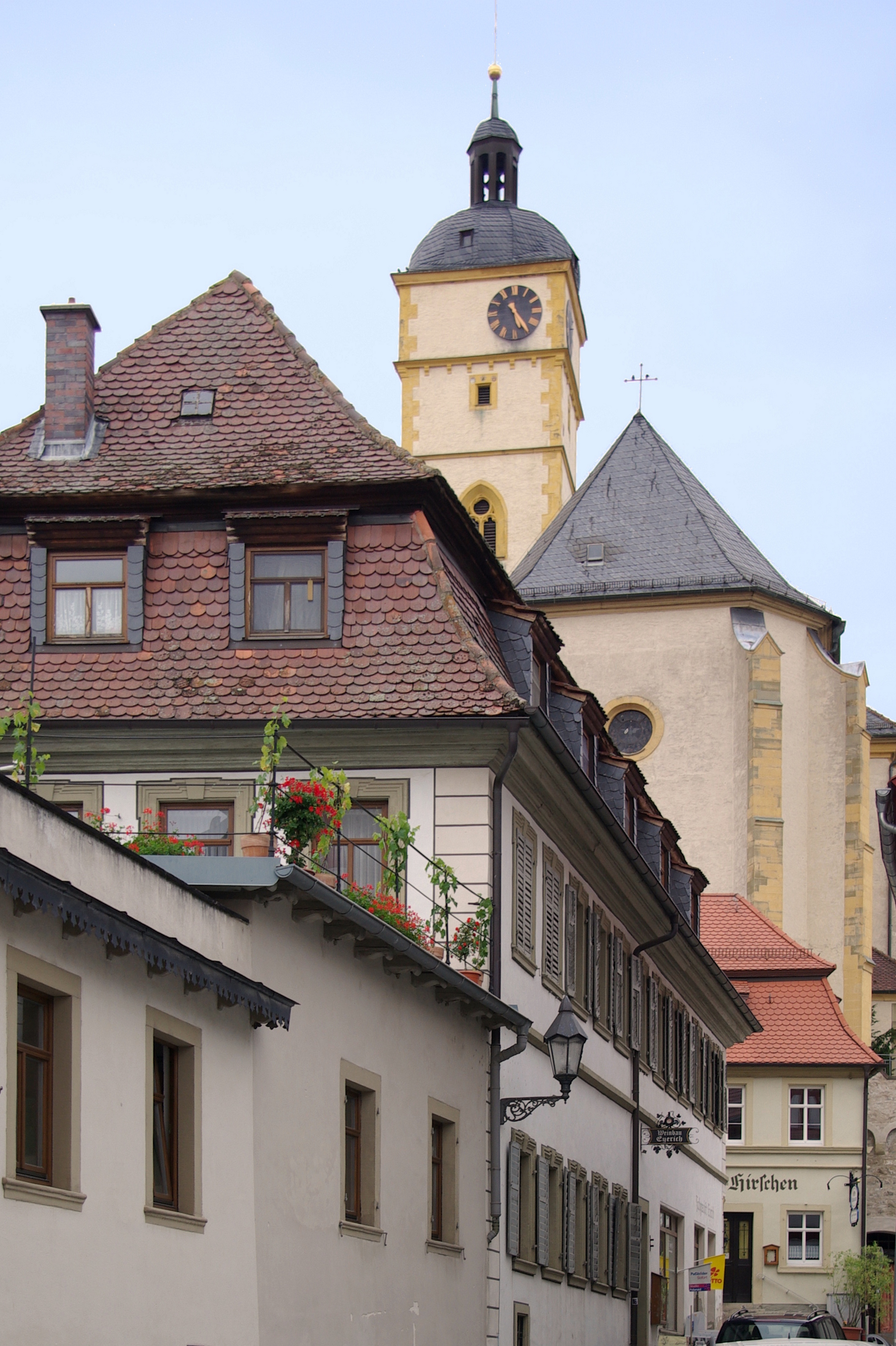

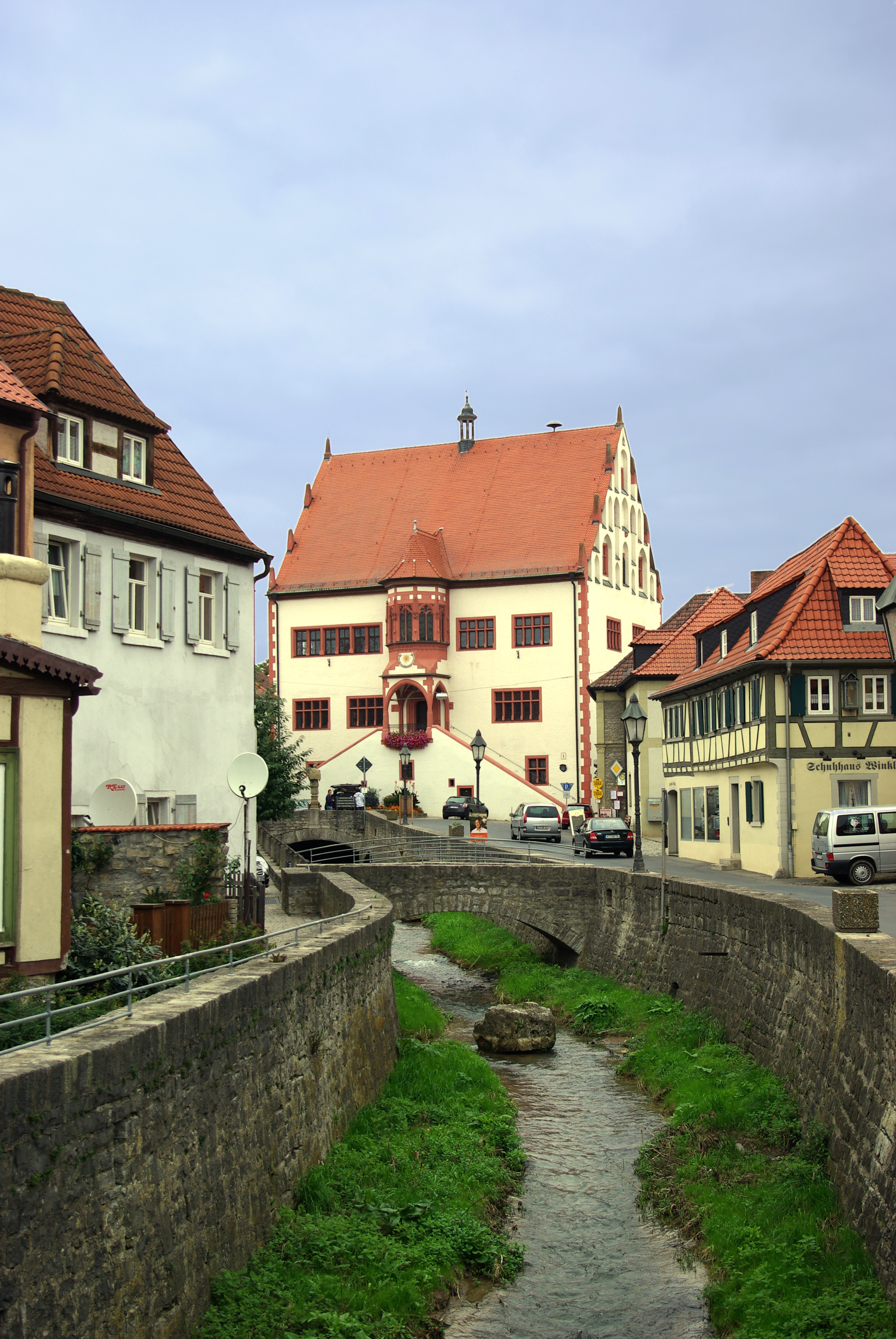

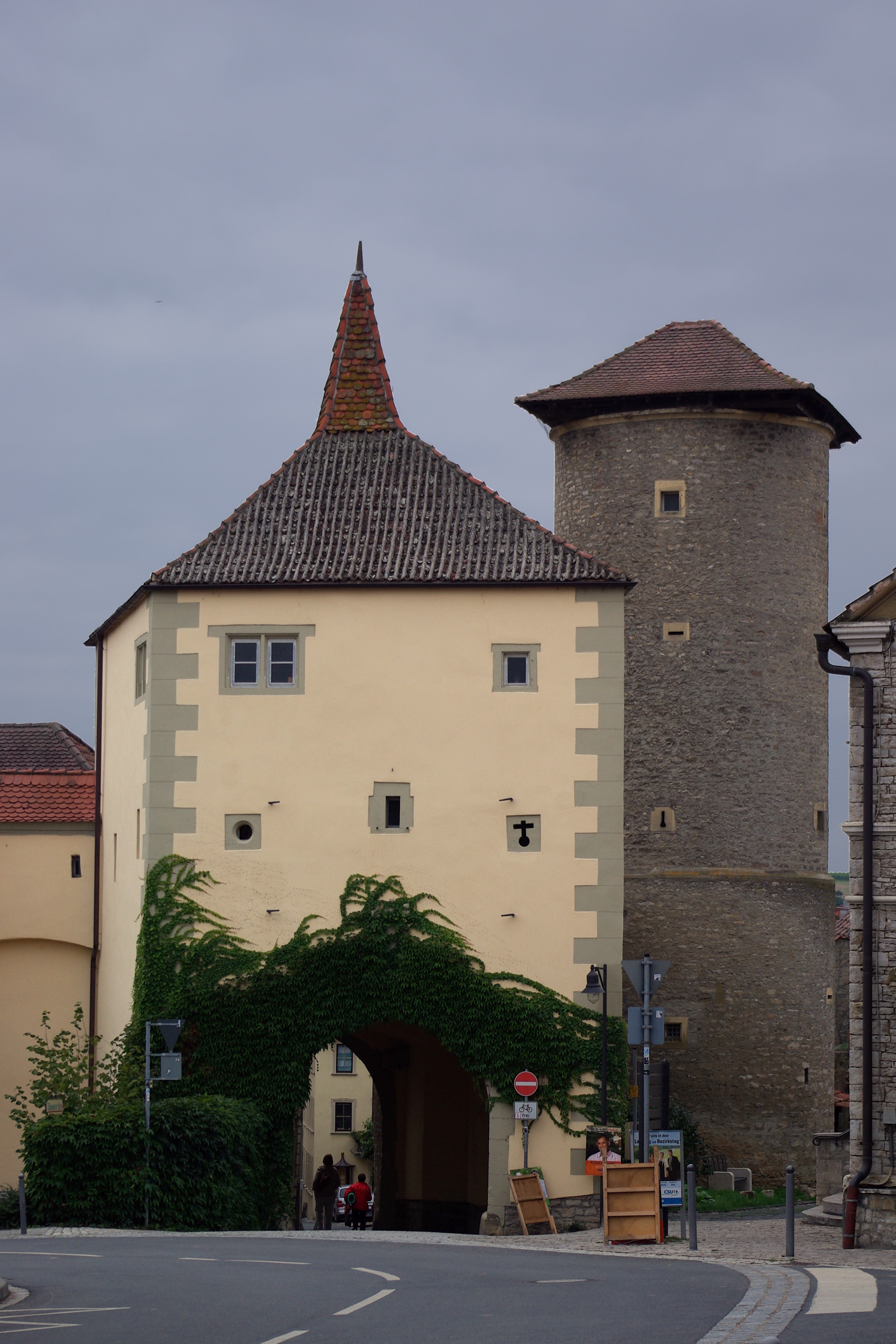

== Mayor ==
Dettelbach's current mayor is Matthias Bielek (Freie Wähler). He received 56.6% of votes at the second round of the 2020 local elections.

== Sons and daughters of the town ==
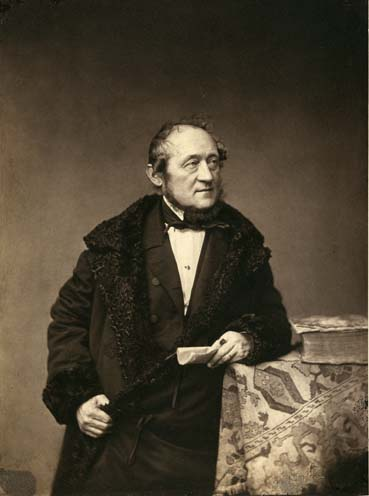
Franz Christoph von Rothmund

- Franz Christoph von Rothmund (1801–1891), German surgeon
- Ela Weber (born 1966), German-Italian announcer and presenter
