= Amici come prima =

2018 Italian comedy film

- Theatrical release poster
- Directed by: Christian De Sica
- Written by: Alessandro Bardani; Fausto Brizzi; Christian De Sica; Edoardo Falcone; Marco Martani
- Starring: Massimo Boldi; Christian De Sica; Regina Orioli; Maurizio Casagrande; Francesco Bruni; Lunetta Savino
- Cinematography: Andrea Arnone
- Edited by: Francesco Galli
- Music by: Bruno Zambrini
- Distributed by: Medusa Film
- Release date: 19 December 2018 (Italy)
- Running time: 80 minutes
- Country: Italy
- Language: Italian

Amici come prima (lit. 'Friends like before') is a 2018 Italian comedy film directed by Christian De Sica.

== Cast ==
- Massimo Boldi as Massimo Colombo
- Christian De Sica as Cesare Proietti / Lisa Sandrelli
- Regina Orioli as Luciana Colombo
- Maurizio Casagrande as Marco Gallo
- Francesco Bruni as Matteo Proietti
- Lunetta Savino as Carla
- Shi Yang Shi as Lahu Wong
- Claudio Insegno as Brumotti
- Vincenzo Failla as Police Commissioner
- Luis Molteni as the doorman
- Francesco Facchinetti as himself
