= Count Max (1991 film) =

- Directed by: Christian De Sica
- Written by: Christian De Sica
- Produced by: Jacopo Capanna; Sarim Fassi; Giuseppe Perugia
- Starring: Christian De Sica; Ornella Muti
- Cinematography: Sergio Salvati
- Edited by: Renato Crociani
- Music by: Manuel De Sica
- Release date: 28 September 1991
- Running time: 88 minutes
- Countries: France; Italy
- Language: Italian

Count Max (Italian: Il conte Max) is a 1991 French-Italian romantic comedy film directed by Christian De Sica and starring De Sica, Ornella Muti and Galeazzo Benti. It is a remake of the 1957 film Count Max, which was itself a remake of the 1937 film Il signor Max. Both films had starred Christian De Sica's father Vittorio De Sica.

== Plot ==
The young Alfredo repairs motors in Rome, but he is vulgar and ignorant, although Alfredo is very friendly with a noble: the "Count Max". Max often invites Alfredo in his palace, amused by Alfredo's gruff ways, and eventually decides to teach him the true ways of etiquette. When the Count Max falls in love with a mysterious French girl, and chases in Paris, Alfredo finds himself alone in a noble palace, and organizes a big party.

== Cast ==
- Christian De Sica as Alfredo
- Ornella Muti as Isabella Matignon
- Galeazzo Benti as Conte Max
- Anita Ekberg as Marika
- Alain Flick as Pierre Dellafont
- Antonello Fassari as Cesare
- María Mercader as Madre di Pierre
- Maurizio Fabbri as Faciolo
- Bruno Corazzari as George
- Karen Moore as Angelita
- Françoise Brion as Ospite di Pierre
- Rosa Miranda as Giovanni
- Raffaella Davi as Marisa
- Lucia Stara as Patrizia
- Egon von Fürstenberg as Sé stesso
- Jacques Stany as Il portiere d'albergo
- John Karlsen as Maggiordomo
- Angelo Bernabucci as Signore romano in piazza

== Bibliography ==
- Koper, Richard. Fifties Blondes: Sexbombs, Sirens, Bad Girls and Teen Queens. BearManor Media, 2010.
