= Count Max (1957 film) =

- Directed by: Giorgio Bianchi
- Written by: Giorgio Bianchi; Mario Camerini; Ruggero Maccari; Amleto Palermi; Ettore Scola; Mario Soldati; Rodolfo Sonego; Alberto Sordi; Luis Trías de Bes
- Produced by: Alfonso Balcázar; Roberto Capitani; Luigi Mondello
- Starring: Alberto Sordi; Vittorio De Sica; Anne Vernon
- Cinematography: Mario Montuori
- Edited by: Adriana Novelli
- Music by: Angelo Francesco Lavagnino
- Production company: Balcázar Producciones Cinematográficas
- Distributed by: Filmax (Spain)
- Release date: 6 November 1957
- Running time: 101 minutes
- Countries: Italy; Spain
- Language: Italian

Count Max (Italian:Il conte Max) is a 1957 Italian-Spanish comedy film directed by Giorgio Bianchi and starring Alberto Sordi, Vittorio De Sica and Anne Vernon. It is a remake of the 1937 film Il signor Max in which De Sica had played the title role. This film was itself remade in 1991.

A newspaper vendor masquerades as a count, falling in with a baroness and her wealthy, aristocratic friends. He believes he is love with her, but comes to realize he has more in common with her maid.

The film's art direction was by Flavio Mogherini.

== Plot ==
Alberto Boccetti, Roman newsagent in Via Veneto, is mistaken for Count Max Orsini Varaldo, a penniless nobleman and scrounger, while on vacation in Cortina (where he went instead of going on vacation to the village of Capracotta as desired by his uncle).

Here he meets Baroness Elena di Villombrosa, who invites him to join the company of nobles, headed to Seville, but also meets their housekeeper Lauretta. In Seville, after contracting debts to give orchids to the baroness, he is repatriated to Italy. Some time later, in Rome, while working in the newsstand, he meets Lauretta who is very surprised by the similarity between Alberto and Count Max. A series of transformations, in which Alberto wears the clothes of the count, who courts the baroness, and those of the newsagent, who make Lauretta suspicious, lead him to have to choose between living a rich life but not his own and another more normal one that belongs to him. The decision comes when he discovers the arrogant and humiliating way in which the nobles treat the beautiful and sweet Lauretta.

== Cast ==
- Alberto Sordi as Alberto Boccetti
- Vittorio De Sica as Conte Max Orsini Varaldo
- Anne Vernon as Baroness Elena di Villombrosa
- Susana Canales as Lauretta Campo
- Tina Pica as La zia
- Juan Calvo as Lo zio Giovanni
- Jacinto San Emeterio as Don Juan de Figueroa
- Diletta D'Andrea as Pucci - sorella di Elena
- Mino Doro as Maj. Guido Amadori
- Piero Stucchi as Giovanni Sampieri - 'Meme'
- Antonella Florio as Patrizia
- Alberto Craig as Stefano
- Edy Biagetti as Gianluca
- Nani Colombo as Nené
- Edith Jost as La contessa
- Luigi Mondello
- Julio Riscal as Paolino
- Marco Tulli as Il sarto

== Bibliography ==
- Rémi Fournier Lanzoni.Comedy Italian style: the golden age of Italian film comedies. Continuum, 2008.
