= Mimì: Prince of Darkness =

- Mimì – Il principe delle tenebre
- Directed by: Brando De Sica
- Written by: Ugo Chiti; Brando De Sica; Irene Pollini Giolai
- Starring: Domenico Cuomo; Sara Ciocca
- Cinematography: Andrea Arnone
- Edited by: Francesco Galli
- Music by: Pasquale Catalano
- Production companies: Indiana Production; Bartleby Film; Rai Cinema
- Distributed by: Luce Cinecittà
- Release date: 9 August 2023 (Locarno)
- Running time: 103 minutes
- Country: Italy
- Language: Italian

Mimì: Prince of Darkness (Italian: Mimì – Il principe delle tenebre) is a 2023 horror film directed by Brando De Sica, starring Domenico Cuomo and Sara Ciocca.

== Plot ==
Mimì is a teenage orphan born with deformed feet who works in a pizzeria in Naples. One bad day he meets Carmilla, a young girl convinced she is a descendant of Count Dracula. Together they decide to flee a cynical and violent world.

== Cast ==
- Domenico Cuomo as Mimì
- Sara Ciocca as Carmilla
- Mimmo Borrelli as Nando
- Giuseppe Brunetti as Bastianello
- Abril Zamora as Giusi
- Dino Porzio as the leader of the goths
- Daniele Vicorito as Rocco

== Release ==
The film was presented on 9 August 2023 out of competition at the Locarno Film Festival.

== Awards ==
2023 - Ciak d'oro

- Nomination for Domenico Cuomo as Rivelation of the year
- Nomination as Best Poster

2023 - Sitges Film Festival

- Honorable Mention Noves Visions Photography (Andrea Arnone)

2024 - Film Festival

- Cinemaitaliano.info Award
- Best Makeup (Michele Salgaro Vaccaro, Andrea Giomaro e Andrea Eusebi)
- Best Hair-Stylist (Giuggiola Acciarino)
- Best Visual Effects (Alessio Pericò)

2024 – Vespertilio Awards

- Best Leading Actor (Domenico Cuomo)
- Best Debut Director (Brando De Sica)
- Best Movie
- Best Editing (Francesco Galli)
- Best Soundtrack (Pasquale Catalano)

2024 – Nastro d'argento

- Nastro d'argento Hamilton – Behind The Camera to Brando De Sica and Domenico Cuomo

2024 - Premio Claudio Caligari

- Best Italian Film Noir
