= Christian De Sica =

Italian actor and director

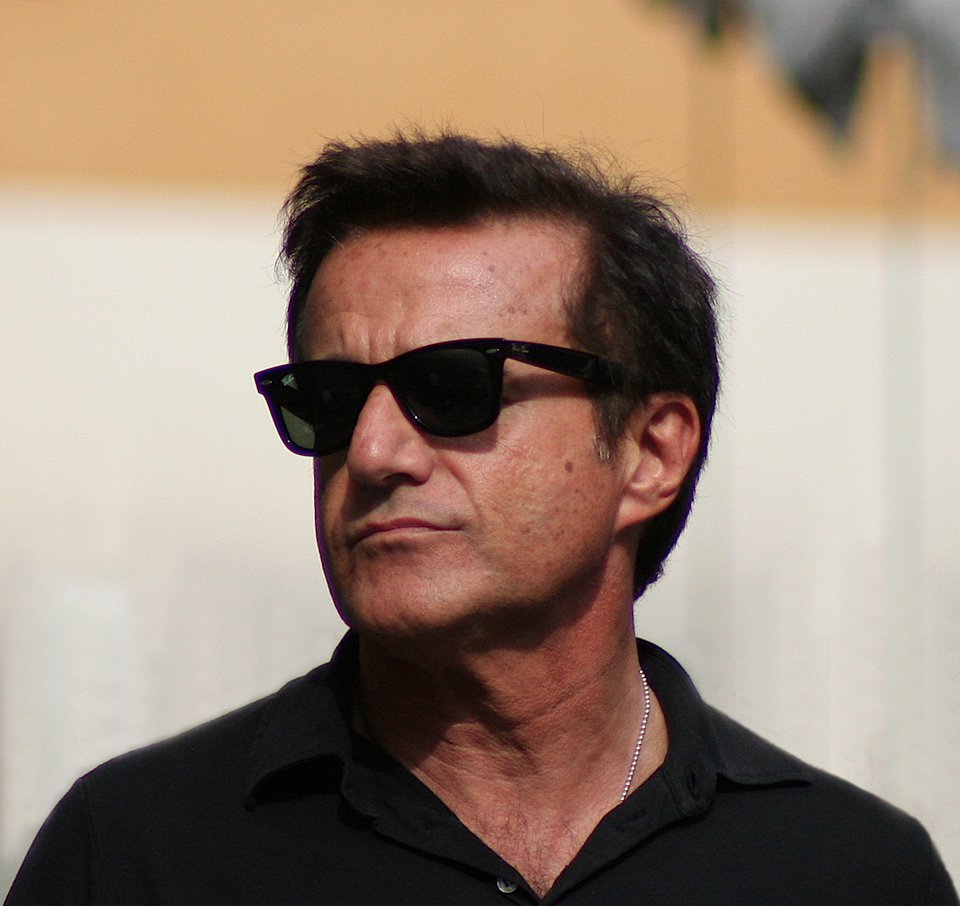
- De Sica in 2007
- Born: 5 January 1951 (age 75); Rome, Italy
- Occupations: Actor; comedian; film director; writer; producer; television presenter
- Spouse: Silvia Verdone (m. 1980)
- Children: 2
- Parent(s): Vittorio De Sica (father); María Mercader (mother)
- Relatives: Manuel De Sica (brother); Carlo Verdone (brother-in-law)

Christian De Sica (Italian pronunciation: [ˈkristjan de ˈsiːka]; born 5 January 1951) is an Italian actor, comedian, television presenter, and filmmaker.

== Life ==
De Sica was born in Rome, the second son of Italian director Vittorio De Sica and Spanish actress María Mercader. His first cousin once removed was Ramón Mercader, the murderer of Leon Trotsky. After attending Liceo classico in Rome, where he had Carlo Verdone as his deskmate, De Sica worked in a hotel in Venezuela, where he began his career as an artist. He enrolled in Lettere (Literature and Arts) at La Sapienza University (1970) but did not graduate.

He was attracted to music, and participated in the Sanremo Music Festival 1973 singing "Mondo mio" ("My World"). However, the results convinced him to follow in his father's footsteps and devote himself to acting. De Sica developed his own style of comedy and entertainment also in Rai television shows, such as Bambole, non c'è una lira, which gave him a large success in 1978.

== Acting career ==
With his father's help, De Sica was able to take his first steps in the movie world with such teachers and mentors as Roberto Rossellini (Blaise Pascal, 1971), Vittorio De Sica himself (A Brief Vacation, 1973), Pupi Avati (House of Pleasure for Women, 1976) and Salvatore Samperi (1979 Liquirizia and 1981 Chaste and Pure).

He married Silvia Verdone, sister of Carlo, with whom he had two children, Brando and Mariarosa. He achieved fame in the 1980s: in 1982 Borotalco was released, together with his brother-in-law Verdone, then he filmed Sapore di Mare with Jerry Calà as well as Yuppies, Yuppies 2, Grandi Magazzini and Compagni di Scuola.

After Night club, the last film directed by Italian director Sergio Corbucci, Christian De Sica became one of the most famous interpreters of the "cine-panettone" (comedies that reach movie theatres during the Christmas season) and formed till 2005 a partnership with actor Massimo Boldi. They acted together in the series of Vacanze di Natale and A spasso nel tempo (1996), Paparazzi (1998), Tifosi (1999) and Christmas in Love (2004). By 2002, their films had grossed 300 billion lire ($150 million). Afterwards, he starred in Natale a New York (2006), Natale in crociera (2007) and Natale a Rio (2008). These films, done in burlesque style, tend to be well received at the box office, if not by critics, at times even outstripping better known and expensively made movies such as the Harry Potter series.

As an actor, De Sica has won three David di Donatello awards: a prize for Giovannino in 1976, a special one together with Massimo Boldi in 2000, and the third one in 2009.

He received the America Award of the Italy-USA Foundation in 2016.

== Directing career ==
Since 1990, Christian De Sica has also been a director: he debuted with Faccione, whose script he wrote and tailor-made for actress Nadia Rinaldi. After Count Max, a homage to the cinema of his father and of Mario Camerini, that he interpreted with Ornella Muti, Anita Ekberg and his mother Maria Mercader, De Sica went on self-directing in Ricky & Barabba (1992), Men Men Men (1995), Tre (1996), Simpatici & antipatici (1998), and The Clan (2005).

Criticism has often likened his acting to that of Alberto Sordi, from whom De Sica has drawn a lot of his expressions.

== Filmography ==
=== Films ===
Title	Year	Role(s)	Director	Notes
Paulina 1880	1972	Attilio Pandolfini	Jean-Louis Bertuccelli	Feature film debut
A Brief Vacation	1973	Boy on train	Vittorio De Sica	Cameo appearance
The Cousin	1974	Ninì Scuderi	Aldo Lado	
The Sex Machine	1975	Daniele Venturoli	Pasquale Campanile	
Sexycop	1976	Vito Militiello	Duccio Tessari	
House of Pleasure for Women	1976	Ugolino Facchini	Pupi Avati	
Giovannino	1976	Giovannino Calì	Paolo Nuzzi	
An Almost Perfect Affair	1979	Carlo Barone	Michael Ritchie	
Liquirizia	1979	Gian Galeazzo Lo Cascio	Salvatore Samperi	
Hypochondriac	1979	Claudio Anzalone	Tonino Cervi	
Love in First Class	1980	Sales assistant	Salvatore Samperi	Cameo appearance
I'm Getting a Yacht	1980	Attilio	Sergio Corbucci	
Chaste and Pure	1981	Carletto Morosini	Salvatore Samperi	
Teste di quoio	1981	Carpets seller	Giorgio Capitani	Cameo appearance
Talcum Powder	1982	Marcello	Carlo Verdone	
Grog	1982	TV presenter	Francesco Laudadio	Cameo appearance
Viuuulentemente mia	1982	Juan Lopez	Carlo Vanzina	
Time for Loving	1983	Felicino Carraro	Carlo Vanzina	
Acqua e sapone	1983	Man at fashion show	Carlo Verdone	Cameo appearance
Vacanze di Natale	1983	Roberto Covelli	Carlo Vanzina	
Vacanze in America	1984	Father Rodolfo	Carlo Vanzina	
Mi faccia causa	1984	Giovanni Pennisi	Steno	
I pompieri	1985	Alberto Spina	Neri Parenti	
Yuppies	1986	Sandro	Carlo Vanzina	
Detective School Dropouts	1986	Carlo Lombardi	Filippo Ottoni	
Grandi magazzini	1986	Antonio Borazzi	Castellano & Pipolo	
Yuppies 2	1986	Sandro	Enrico Oldoini	
Montecarlo Gran Casinò	1987	Furio	Carlo Vanzina	
Bellifreschi	1987	Mario "Jerry" Marcelli	Enrico Oldoini	
I pompieri 2	1987	Alberto Spina	Giorgio Capitani	
Compagni di scuola	1988	Bruno Ciardulli	Carlo Verdone	
Night Club	1989	Walter Danesi	Sergio Corbucci	
Fratelli d'Italia	1989	Cesare Proietti	Neri Parenti	
Vacanze di Natale '90	1990	Tony	Enrico Oldoini	
Count Max	1991	Alfredo / Count Max	Christian De Sica	Also director and screenwriter
Faccione	1991	None	Christian De Sica	Director and screenwriter
Vacanze di Natale '91	1991	Enzo Lambertoni	Enrico Oldoini	
Anni 90	1992	Cesare Proietti / Lando Marcelli	Enrico Oldoini	
Ricky & Barabba	1992	Barabba	Christian De Sica	Also director and screenwriter
Anni 90: Parte II	1993	Rodolfo Buro / Roberto Torri	Enrico Oldoini	
S.P.Q.R.: 2,000 and a Half Years Ago	1994	Cesare Atticus	Carlo Vanzina	
Men Men Men	1995	Vittorio Mannino	Christian De Sica	Also director and screenwriter
Vacanze di Natale '95	1995	Remo Proietti	Neri Parenti	
3	1996	Jacopo Del Serchio	Christian De Sica	Also director and screenwriter
A spasso nel tempo	1996	Ascanio Orsini Varaldo	Carlo Vanzina	
A spasso nel tempo - L'avventura continua	1997	Ascanio Orsini Varaldo	Carlo Vanzina	
Simpatici e antipatici	1998	Roberto	Christian De Sica	Also director
Paparazzi	1998	Cesare Proietti	Neri Parenti	
Tifosi	1999	Cesare Proietti	Neri Parenti	
Vacanze di Natale 2000	1999	Giovanni Covelli	Carlo Vanzina	
Chicken Run	2000	Rocky (voice)	Peter Lord, Nick Park	Italian voice-over
Body Guards	2000	Fabio Leone	Neri Parenti	
Merry Christmas	2001	Fabio Trivellone	Neri Parenti	
Christmas on the Nile	2002	Mr. Ciulla	Neri Parenti	
Natale in India	2003	Fabio De Tassis	Neri Parenti	
Christmas in Love	2004	Fabrizio Barbetti	Neri Parenti	
The Clan	2005	Franco	Christian De Sica	Also director and screenwriter
Natale a Miami	2005	Giorgio Bassi	Neri Parenti	
Natale a New York	2006	Camillo Ferri	Neri Parenti	
Natale in crociera	2007	Paolo Cioffa	Neri Parenti	
Horton Hears a Who!	2008	Horton (voice)	Jimmy Hayward, Steve Martino	Italian voice-over
Natale a Rio	2008	Paolo Berni	Neri Parenti	
Natale a Beverly Hills	2009	Carlo / Germano	Neri Parenti	
The Youngest Son	2010	Luciano Baietti	Pupi Avati	
The Tourist	2010	Colonel Lombardi	Florian Henckel von Donnersmarck	
Natale in Sudafrica	2010	Carlo Boffa	Neri Parenti	
Amici miei - Come tutto ebbe inizio	2011	Filippo	Neri Parenti	
Vacanze di Natale a Cortina	2011	Roberto Covelli	Neri Parenti	
Buona giornata	2012	Prince Ascanio Cavallini	Carlo Vanzina	
The Pirates! In an Adventure with Scientists!	2012	Pirate Captain (voice)	Peter Lord, Jeff Newitt	Italian voice-over
Lightning Strike	2012	Alberto Benni	Neri Parenti	Segment: "Primo episodio"
The Unlikely Prince	2013	Anastasio	Alessandro Siani	
Colpi di fortuna	2013	Gabriele Brunelli	Neri Parenti	
La scuola più bella del mondo	2014	Principal Brogi	Luca Miniero	
Vacanze ai Caraibi	2015	Mario Grossi Tubi	Neri Parenti	Also screenwriter
Fräulein	2016	Walter Bonelli	Caterina Carone	
Poveri ma ricchi	2016	Danilo Tucci	Fausto Brizzi	
Poveri ma ricchissimi	2017	Danilo Tucci	Fausto Brizzi	
Amici come prima	2018	Cesare Proietti	Christian De Sica	Also director and screenwriter
Sono solo fantasmi	2019	Tommaso Di Paola / Vittorio Di Paola	Christian De Sica	Also director and screenwriter
La mia banda suona il pop	2020	Tony Brando	Fausto Brizzi	
In vacanza su Marte	2020	Fabio Sinceri	Neri Parenti	
Comedians	2021	Bernardo Celli	Gabriele Salvatores	
Who Framed Santa Claus?	2021	Santa Claus	Alessandro Siani	
Watch Out, We're Mad!	2022	Torsillo	YouNuts!	
The Price of Family	2022	Carlo Delle Fave	Giovanni Bognetti	
The Price of Nonna's Inheritance	2024	Carlo Delle Fave	Giovanni Bognetti	
Another Summer Holiday	2024	Pierluigi Nardi Masciulli	Paolo Virzì	
Cortina Express	2024	Lucio De Roberti	Eros Puglielli	
Agata Christian – Delitti sulle nevi	2026	Christian Agata	Eros Puglielli	

=== Television ===
Title	Year	Role(s)	Network	Notes
Blaise Pascal	1972	Lieutenant	Rai 1	Miniseries; cameo appearance
Alle sette della sera	1974–1975	Himself / Host	Rai 2	Variety show
La compagnia stabile della canzone con varietà e con comica finale	1975	Himself / Host	Rai 1	Special
Bambole, non c'e una lira	1978	Various	Rai 1	Variety show
Paris-Vichy	1979	Arnold	France 2	Television movie
Studio 80	1980	Himself / Host	Rai 1	Variety show
Sotto le stelle	1982	Himself / Host	Rai 1	Musical program (season 2)
Flipper	1983	Photographer	Rai 1	Television movie
Cinema che follia!	1988	Himself / Host	Rai 2	Variety show
Belli freschi	1993	Various	Canale 5	Sketch comedy
Lo zio d'America	2002–2006	Massimo Ricciardi	Rai 1	12 episodes
Attenti a quei tre	2004	Luca	Rai 1	Miniseries
Tale e quale show	2012–2014, 2017, 2021	Himself / Judge	Rai 1	Talent show (seasons 1–4, 7, 11)
Un matrimonio	2013–2014	Pippo Dagnini	Rai 1	6 episodes
Striscia la notizia	2015	Himself / Guest host	Canale 5	Variety show (from September 28–October 24)
Mozart in the Jungle	2016	Mr. Beppi	Prime Video	5 episodes
Miss Italia	2017	Himself / Judge	La7	Annual beauty contest
Christian De Sica: Una serata tra amici	2021	Himself / Host	Rai 1	Special
Gigolò per caso	2023–present	Giacomo Bremer	Prime Video	12 episodes
Ne vedremo delle belle	2025	Himself / Judge	Rai 1	Talent show competition
