= 3 (1996 film) =

1996 Italian comedy film

- Directed by: Christian De Sica
- Written by: Christian De Sica; Giovanni Veronesi
- Produced by: Vittorio Cecchi Gori
- Starring: Christian De Sica; Anna Galiena; Paolo Conticini
- Cinematography: Ennio Guarnieri
- Edited by: Paolo Benassi
- Music by: Manuel De Sica
- Release date: October 4, 1996 (Italy)
- Running time: 95 minutes
- Country: Italy
- Language: Italian

3 (Tre) is a 1996 Italian period comedy-drama film directed by Christian De Sica. and written by Christian De Sica, and Giovanni Veronesi

== Cast ==
- Christian De Sica as Jacopo Del Serchio
- Anna Galiena as Chiara Del Serchio
- Paolo Conticini as Leonardo
- Leo Gullotta as the Bishop of Pisa
- Francesco De Angelis as Leonardo Del Serchio
- Carlo Monni as Pietro
- Nicoletta Boris as Pietro's wife
- Irene Grazioli as Chiara
