= Ela Weber =

German model, showgirl and actress (born 1966)

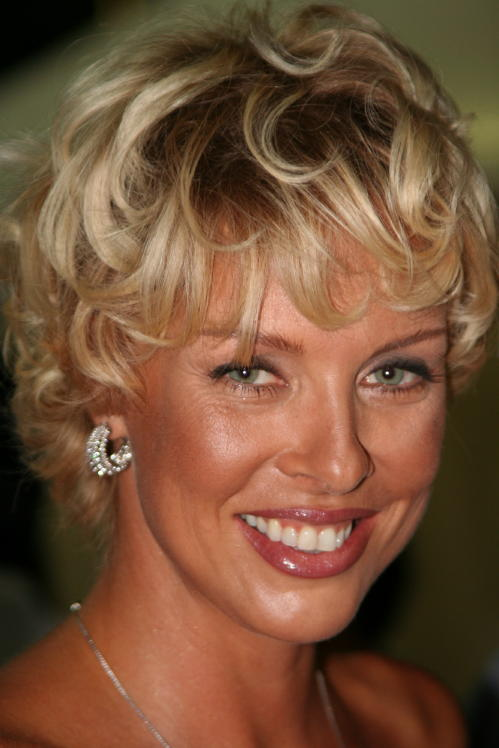
- Born: Manuela Hannelore Weber; 13 March 1966 (age 59); Dettelbach, West Germany

Manuela Hannelore "Ela" Weber (born 13 March 1966) is a German model, showgirl and actress.

== Life and career ==
Born in Dettelbach, in 1984 Weber moved to New York City, where she started working as a spokesmodel for Playtex. In the late 1980s she moved to Italy, and after minor roles in variety shows such as Scherzi a parte and Stranamore her breakout came in 1996, when she started co-hosting alongside Paolo Bonolis, the Canale 5 quiz show Tira e molla. Among her other television appearances, between 1998 and 2000 she hosted the sport talk show Goleada, and in 2000 she hosted the awards ceremony of the FIFA World Player of the Year. In 2008 Weber participated to the Raidue reality show L'Isola dei Famosi. Weber also appeared in several films and stage plays. In 2018 she appeared as a housemate in Grande Fratello VIP, the italian adaptation of Celebrity Big Brother.
