= Mario Feliciani =

Italian actor (1918–2008)

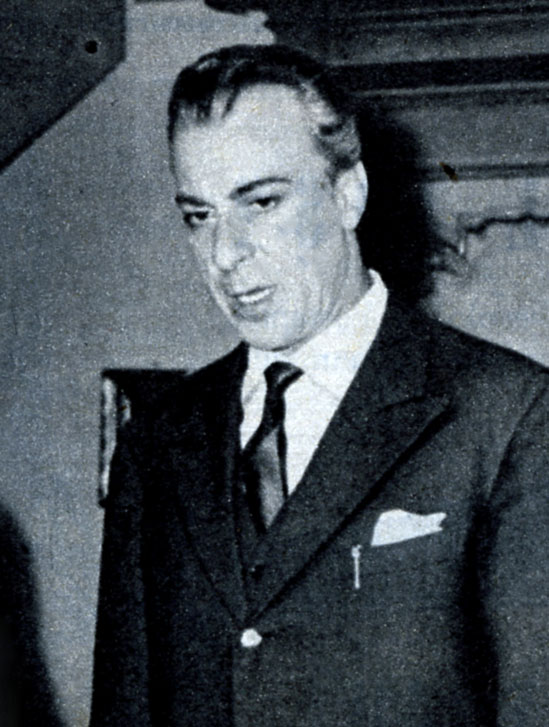
- Born: 12 March 1918; Milan, Italy
- Died: 11 August 2008 (aged 90); Barcelona, Spain
- Occupation: Actor
- Years active: 1946–1993
- Spouse(s): Giuliana Pogliani (annulled); Vittoria Martello (his death)

Mario Feliciani (12 March 1918 – 11 August 2008) was an Italian actor and voice actor.

== Life and career ==
Born in Milan, after completing his classical education Feliciani attended the Accademia dei filodrammatici obtaining the diploma. He made his stage debut in 1941, with the theatrical company "Palcoscenico". Later he was part of various companies, obtaining his first personal successes in 1946, with the drama La luna è tramontata.

From 1947 to 1952 he was a member of the Piccolo Teatro's stage company directed by Giorgio Strehler. He had also a very long and important collaboration on stage with Vittorio Gassman, also performing tours abroad with him. In the 1970s he came back to Piccolo Teatro for two important works, Santa Giovanna dei macelli (1970–71) and Le case del vedovo (1975–76).

Feliciani was also very active in films, on television and as a voice actor, on the radio and in the dubbing.

Married to the actress Giuliana Pogliani, after obtaining the annulment Feliciani was married to actress Vittoria Martello.

== Partial filmography ==
- Paese senza pace (1946) – Conocchia
- Sardinian Vendetta (1952) – Zio Porchiddu
- Five Paupers in an Automobile (1952) – Il parrucchiere
- La figlia del diavolo (1952) – Domenico
- Brothers of Italy (1952) – Cesare Battisti
- We Two Alone (1952) – Cairolas' Father
- Puccini (1953) – Enrico
- Captain Phantom (1953)
- Ivan (il figlio del diavolo bianco) (1953)
- Ulysses (1954) – Eurimaco
- Attila (1954) – Ippolito
- Big Deal on Madonna Street (1958) – Ispettore di polizia (uncredited)
- The Great War (1959) – (uncredited)
- Audace colpo dei soliti ignoti (1959) – Police inspector
- Everybody Go Home (1960) – Capitano Passerini
- The Last of the Vikings (1961) – Simon
- Maciste Vs. the Vampire (1961) – Sultan Abdul / Omar
- Rage of the Buccaneers (1961) – The Governor
- The Italian Brigands (1961) – Don Ramiro
- The Corsican Brothers (1961) – Dr. Dupont
- Dreams Die at Dawn (1961) – Mario
- La monaca di Monza (1962) – Don Martino de Leyva
- The Golden Arrow (1962) – Baktiar
- Shades of Zorro (1962) – McDonald
- The Sign of the Coyote (1963) – Governor Parker
- Son of the Circus (1963) – Ministero Pubblico
- Devil of the Desert Against the Son of Hercules (1964) – Ganor, Devil of the Desert
- Revolt of the Barbarians (1964)
- 100 Horsemen (1964) – Sheik Aben Calbon
- Three Swords for Rome (1964)
- Fire Over Rome (1965)
- Assassination in Rome (1965)
- Casanova 70 (1965) – Il procuratore
- Lady L (1965) – L'anarchiste italien
- El Greco (1966) – Nino de Guevara
- Maigret a Pigalle (1966) – Il direttore della polizia giudiziaria
- The Cold Killer (1966)
- Red Roses for Angelica (1966) – Dr. Durand
- The Christmas Tree (1969) – Le docteur
- Many Wars Ago (1970) – Colonello medici
- Gang War (1971) – Calogero Bertuccione
- Roma Bene (1971) – Teo Teopoulos
- Pianeta Venere (1972)
- The Silkworm (1973) – Avv. Planget
- Convoy Busters (1978) – Prosecutor
- Lion of the Desert (1980) – Lobitto
- Pierino medico della Saub (1981) – Dottor Tambroni
- Forest of Love (1981)
- Amici miei – Atto III (1985) – Generale Mastrostefano
