= Virgilio Tosi =

Italian filmmaker (1925–2023)

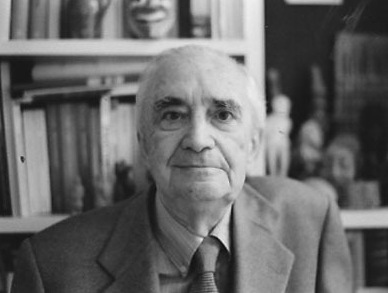
- Born: 29 November 1925
- Died: 15 April 2023 (aged 97)

Virgilio Tosi (29 November 1925 – 15 April 2023) was an Italian documentary filmmaker and historian of early film.

== Early life ==
Virgilio Tosi was born in Milan on 29 November 1925. On 10 June 1940, the day Italy entered World War II, Tosi started working as an apprentice invoice-clerk at the Milan seat of a German firm dealing in steel products, while pursuing his studies in his spare time.

== Early career ==
At the end of 1942, Tosi was noticed at an international youth meeting on theatre, and offered a position in the newly instituted Italian Theatrical Institute (Ente Teatrale Italiano), which had been created to run theatres and theatrical companies and was established in Rome.

Meanwhile, he had engaged himself not dropping out of his studies, and passed his final secondary school exams in classical studies as an external student in 1943, in adventurous circumstances owing to Italy’s division in the war.

At the end of World War II, having left the Italian Theatrical Institute, Tosi started working as a theatre and cinema critic while studying philosophy at university. In 1946 he was among the promoters of the Theatre Association “Il Diogene”, where he worked as an executive secretary; other members of the managing board were Mario Apollonio, Paolo Grassi and Giorgio Strehler.

The following year, he participated in the creation of the Piccolo Teatro della Città di Milano. The town’s City Council designated him, along with Grassi, Strehler and Apollonio, as members of the first managing committee of the theatre, responsible for the technical and artistic management.

Tosi became increasingly interested in cinema. He was a founding member of the Cineteca Italiana in Milan and participated in the Filmclubs movement of the period; in 1947, he was among the promoters of the founding of the Italian Film Societies Federation (Federazione Italiana dei Circoli del Cinema), where he occupied executive positions between 1949 and 1952. Meanwhile, he started working as a scriptwriter for fiction films, and his professional apprenticeship in this area greatly increased through cooperation with Cesare Zavattini.

== Mature career ==
Tosi started directing documentaries and subsequently decided to pursue this activity, specializing in scientific documentaries, continuing to work as cinema critic and essay writer all the while. In the 1960s, he started cooperating with RAI, the Italian national public television network, for a number of television programs.

Among his activities, he worked as a consultant for UNESCO, the Istituto Luce, Rome’s National Gallery of Modern Arts, was president of the International Scientific Film Association and of the Italian Scientific Film Association, and research director in the field of audiovisuals for the National Research Council (Consiglio Nazionale delle Ricerche), the National Film School (Centro Sperimentale di Cinematografia) and RAI.

He pursued historical research on the scientific origins of cinematography, and realized experimental research to study the perception of the language of moving images through the recording of eye movements.

== Later career ==
From 1976 Tosi taught at the Centro Sperimentale di Cinematografia and held seminars and conferences in many universities and film schools in Italy and abroad (United Kingdom, France, Mexico and other European and Latin-American countries). Since 1988 he also taught at the Documentary School “Zelig” in Bolzano. His main teaching subjects were “History and Critic of Documentary Film” and “Scientific Documentary Techniques”.

Between 2002 and 2004 he taught, as a temporary professor, the course of Documentary Film at Rome University “La Sapienza”. Since 2012 he wrote "La rubrica di Virgilio" for the Italian documentary portal ildocumentario.it.

At the 31st Pordenone Silent Film Festival he was awarded, in 2012, the International Prize "Jean Mitry" for "those who distinguish themselves in their storiographic research efforts" (video presentation on YouTube by Paolo Cherchi Usai).

Tosi died in Rome on 15 April 2023, at the age of 97.

== Bibliography ==
- Il concept film, Associazione Italiana di Cinematografia Scientifica, Roma, 1970, 39 pp.
- Cinematografia scientifica e mezzi audiovisivi per la ricerca, l’informazione e l’insegnamento delle scienze, in S & T 76, Annual of the Enciclopedia della Scienza e della Tecnica, Mondadori-UNESCO, Milano 1976; also published in a separate volume along with essays by other authors, under the title Metodi ed esperienze di informazione audiovisiva nella ricerca e nell’insegnamento delle scienze, Edizioni Scientifiche e Tecniche Mondadori, Milano, 1976.
- Cinematography and Scientific Research, UNESCO, Paris, 1977, 60 pp., ill. (also available in Japanese and French language editions, extracts in Italian and in German).
- Il cinema prima di Lumière, ERI, Torino-Roma, 1984, 332 pp., ill.
- How to Make Scientific Audio-Visuals for Research, Teaching, Popularization, UNESCO, Paris, 1984, 157 pp.
- Il linguaggio delle immagini in movimento, Armando, Roma, 1986, 200 pp., ill. (Italian version of How to Make Scientific Audio-Visuals for Research, Teaching, Popularization.)
- Manual de Cine Cientìfico, UNAM-UNESCO, Mexico, 1987, 200 pp., ill. (Spanish version of How to Make Scientific Audio-Visuals for Research, Teaching, Popularization.)
- Marey and Muybridge: How Modern Biomechanics Analysis Started, in Biolocomotion: A Century of Research Using Moving Pictures (eds. A. Cappozzo, M. Marchetti, V. Tosi), International Society of Biomechanics, Promograph, Roma, 1992.
- El cine antes de Lumière, Universidad Nacional Autonoma de Mexico, Mexico 1993, 312 pp., ill. (updated Spanish version of Il cinema prima di Lumière).
- El lenguaje de las imagines en movimiento, Grijalbo, Mexico, 1993, 180 pp., ill. (second Spanish version of How to Make Scientific Audio-Visuals for Research, Teaching, Popularization.)
- Movimenti oculari e percezione di sequenze filmiche, (co-authors L. Mecacci, E. Pasquali), C.S.C.-Pàtron, Roma-Bologna, 1994), 47 pp., ill.
- Quando il cinema era un circolo - La stagione d’oro dei cineclub (1945–1956), S.N.C.-Marsilio, Roma-Venezia, 1999, 230 pp., ill.
- Breve storia tecnologica del cinema, Bulzoni, Roma, 2001, 151 pp., ill.
- Joris Ivens. Cinema e utopia, Bulzoni, Roma, 2002, 244 pp., ill.
- Cinema Before Cinema, BUFVC, London, 2005, 234 pp., ill. (expanded and updated English version of Il cinema prima di Lumière).
- Il cinema prima del cinema, Il Castoro, Milano, 2007, 294 pp., ill. (new expanded and updated Italian version of Il cinema prima di Lumière).
- Pagine di un libro che non sarà mai completato, text included in "Praga da una primavera all'altra 1968–1969" (exhibition catalogue, editor Annalisa Cosentino, Forum, Editrice Universitaria Udinese, Udine, 2008, pp. 168–203.
- Osvaldo Polimanti: il cinema per le scienze, Carocci, Roma, 2011, 117 pp. ill. (by Lorenzo Lorusso, Virgilio Tosi, Giovanni Almadori), published together with L'utilizzo della cinematografia nelle scienze, nella medicina e nell'insegnamento by Osvaldo Polimanti (first Italian translation of the German original, published in 1920 in Wissenschaftliche Kinematographie, Leipzig, Liesegang Verlag); introduction by Virgilio Tosi.
- Storia di un'adolescenza breve, Carocci, Roma, 2015, 210 pp.
- Le immagini in movimento e la rivoluzione digitale, Carocci, Roma, 2020, 107 pp. (with Lorenzo Lorusso and Marcello Seregni)

== Television programs - Selected titles ==
- Short documentaries in the weekly programs “TV7” and “Cordialmente”, RAI-TV, 1964
- Several dozen of educational programs for RAI-TV Dipartimento Scuola-Educazione: series of lessons on chemistry, electro-chemistry, physics, nuclear physics, physics-chemistry, astronomy. Among others: Modelli di impostazione didattica: Biologia (scientific advisor prof. E. Capanna), series of lessons on history of science; Problemi di metodologia scientifica (scientific advisor prof. L. Lombardo Radice), series of lessons on the major scientific revolutions– 1967–1972.
- Directed 50 instalments of the program "Medicina Oggi", continuing professional education programme for doctors – 1971–1973.
- Numerous instalments for the multi-annual programme "Orizzonti della scienza e della technica", from its first instalment and during its whole existence (1968–1979). Among others: In diretta dall’occhio, monographic programme on experiments on the study of ocular movements – 1969 (the experiments were then followed up by experimental research at the Centro Sperimentale di Cinematografia, in cooperation with RAI-TV and the Consiglio Nazionale delle Ricerche (1982–1994) – see bibliography.
- Fifteen instalments of a cultural programme based exclusively on photographs: Album, Fotogafie dell'Italia di ieri (in cooperation with P. Berengo Gardin) – 1977–1978. On the basis of this television series, Bologna’s Galleria d’Arte Moderna di Bologna and RAI-TV organised a photographic and audiovisual exhibition shown in many Italian and foreign cities (through the Italian cultural institutes).
- Script-writer of the TV-Film on Lazzaro Spallanzani for the series "Uomini del scienza", curator Lucio Lombardo-Radice – 1977.
- Series of twelve television programmes (re-run four times): La scienza al cinema – 60 anni di cinema scientifico italiano – rubrica Cineteca del Dipartimento Scuola Educazione della RAI-TV – 1980–1982.

== Filmography ==
- La battaglia di Milano (1949 – Documentary, realized on behalf of Milan’s Camera del Lavoro di Milano, on the occupation by workers of some large metal transformation factories in order to stop their dismantling – no copy to be found)
- Elettroshock (1950 – Scientific research documentary, realized on the initiative of prof. Ugo Cerletti (Rome University) to show the effects of electroshock along the zoological chain and on humans –never completed, some materials should survive in the Istituto Luce archives)
- Enciclopedia Cinematografia "Conoscere" (1952–1955 – prod. Filmeco - 12 documentary “items” (Acqua, Barometro, Clorofilla, Culla Termostatica, Elettroencefalogramma, Illusioni ottiche, Innesto, Obesità, Polmone d’acciaio, Russare, Specchio, Zero assoluto), as well as participation in management of the initiative, directed by Michele Gandin
- Inchiesta alimentare a rofrano (1954 – produced by Consiglio Nazionale delle Richerche-Istituto Luce)
- Mimetismo animale (1956)
- Riflessi condizionati (1956)
- La casa dell'erpetologo (1957)
- L'universo di Dante, i cinque sensi, l'occio, i denti (1957 – didactic documentaries)
- Premio Nobel (1958)
- Le guardie del sole (1958)
- Le cure parentali E (1958 – produced by Luce, award at the International Scientific Film Festival, Moscow)
- I Roditori (1959 – produced by Luce, award at the International Festival of Film for Youth, Venice)
- Biologia del sesso (1959 – codirected by A. Stefanelli, Bucranio d'argento award at the International Scientific Film Festival, Padova University)
- Sincrotrone (1959 – award at the International Scientific Film Festival, Oxford-London, "Nastro d'argento" diploma, award at the Electronics Festival, Rome and at the Industrial Film Festival, Monza)
- Un quarto d'Italia (1961 – based on a project by Cesare Zavattini, extended documentary realized on behalf of the Associazione tra le Casse di Risparmio Italiane.
- Radiazioni pericolose (1961 – produced in cooperation with the Comitato Nazionale per l’Energia Nucleare)
- Vedere l'invisibile (1961 – produced in cooperation with the Comitato Nazionale per l’Energia Nucleare – modified version of Sincrotrone)
- L'atomo in mare (1962 – produced in cooperation with the Comitato Nazionale per l’Energia Nucleare)
- La professione di Capo (1963 – Five medium-length films produced for Italsider)
- Il quarto stato della materia (1964 – produced in cooperation with the Comitato Nazionale per l’Energia Nucleare, prize at the International Scientific Film Festival, Athens and at the Industrial Film Festival, Genova)
- Fusione controllata dell'idrogeno (1964 – produced in cooperation with the Comitato Nazionale per l’Energia Nucleare)
- Fall out (1964 – produced in cooperation with the Comitato Nazionale per l’Energia Nucleare, award at the Industrial Film Festival, Monza)
- Disegno industriale (1964, award at the Industrial Film Festival, Bologna)
- 1+1=10 (1964 – codirected by M. Gandin – produced in cooperation with the Comitato Nazionale per l’Energia Nucleare, prize at the Industrial Film Festival, Genova)
- Operazione qualità (1966 – Three medium-length films produced for Italsider)
- P.Q. 2 Anno terzo (1968 – produced in cooperation with the Comitato Nazionale per l’Energia Nucleare)
- Fotografia della famiglia Italiana (1969–1970, selected for the Festival dei Popoli, Firenze)
- Telecomunicare (1970)
- Pulsazioni in vitro (1970 – produced by Istituto Luce)
- La misura del tempo (1973 – produced by Mondadori)
- Un pioniere del cinema scientifico: Roberto Omegna (1974 – produced by Luce, prize at the International Scientific Film Festival, Miskolc-Budapest)
- Le vipere (1975 – produced by Luce, prize at the International Scientific Film Festival, Eindhoven)
- Acque costiere (1982 – produced by Luce)
- The origins of scientific cinematography (1990–1993 – European coproduction: I.W.F., Germany, CNRS-AV, France, Istituto Luce, Italy) – Series of three films (versions in English, French, German, Italian, Spanish):
  - The pioneers - 52’
  - Technical developments around the turn of the century - 17’
  - Early applications - 30’.
- Elogio dell'imperfezione - incontro con Rita Levi Montalcini - (2000 - produced by Scuola Nazionale di Cinema - Archivio della memoria - Ritratti italiani n. 3) - 56'.
