= Gianrico Tedeschi =

Italian actor and voice actor (1920–2020)

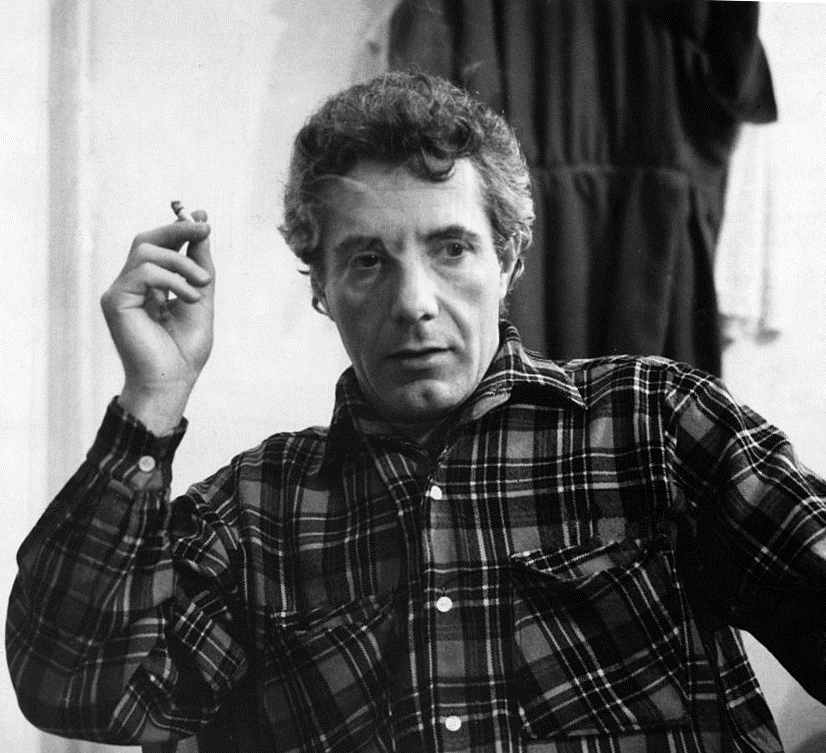
- Tedeschi in 1956
- Born: 20 April 1920; Milan, Italy
- Died: 27 July 2020 (aged 100); Pettenasco, Italy
- Occupations: Actor; voice actor
- Years active: 1943–2013

Gianrico Tedeschi (20 April 1920 – 27 July 2020) was an Italian actor and voice actor.

== Life and career ==
Born in Milan in April 1920, Tedeschi got a degree in pedagogy before enrolling at the Silvio D'Amico National Academy of Dramatic Art, which he abandoned after two years to make his professional debut with the Evi Maltagliati-Salvo Randone-Tino Carraro stage company. In the late 1940s he entered the Andreina Pagnani-Gino Cervi theatrical company, with whom he got his first personal success for his performance in the comedy play Quel signore che venne a pranzo. He later worked intensively with Luchino Visconti and with the Piccolo Teatro directed by Giorgio Strehler. He also toured in the United States, the Soviet Union, Paris and London.

In his variegated career, Tedeschi was very active as a voice actor, a dubber and a radio personality, and starting from the early 1950s he appeared in numerous films and TV series, even if often playing supporting roles. He appeared in 50 films between 1943 and 2013.

On 20 April 2020, Tedeschi celebrated his 100th birthday and received a special message from the Italian President Sergio Mattarella that same day. Tedeschi died on 27 July that year in Pettenasco.

== Selected filmography ==
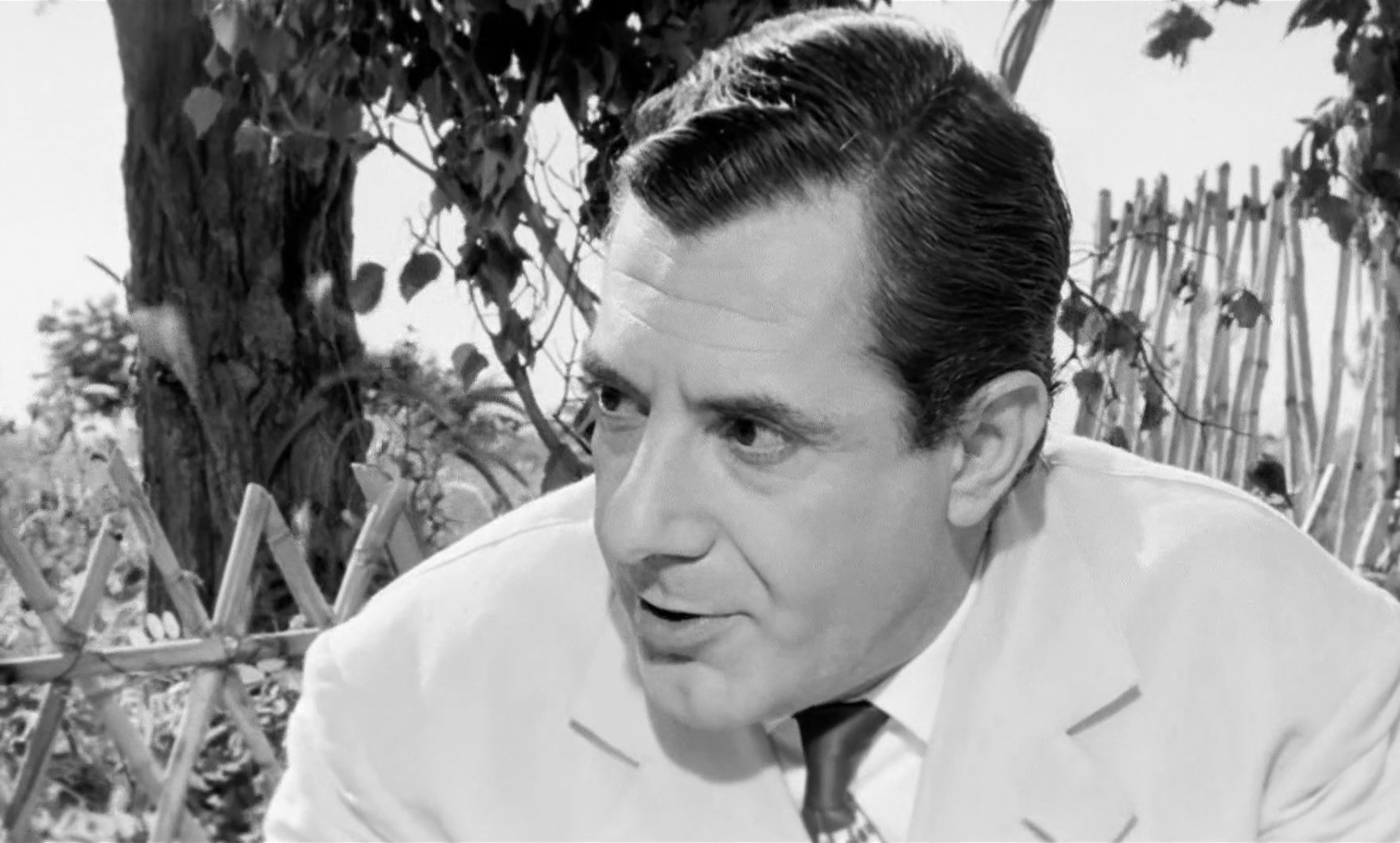
Tedeschi in Adua and Her Friends (1960)

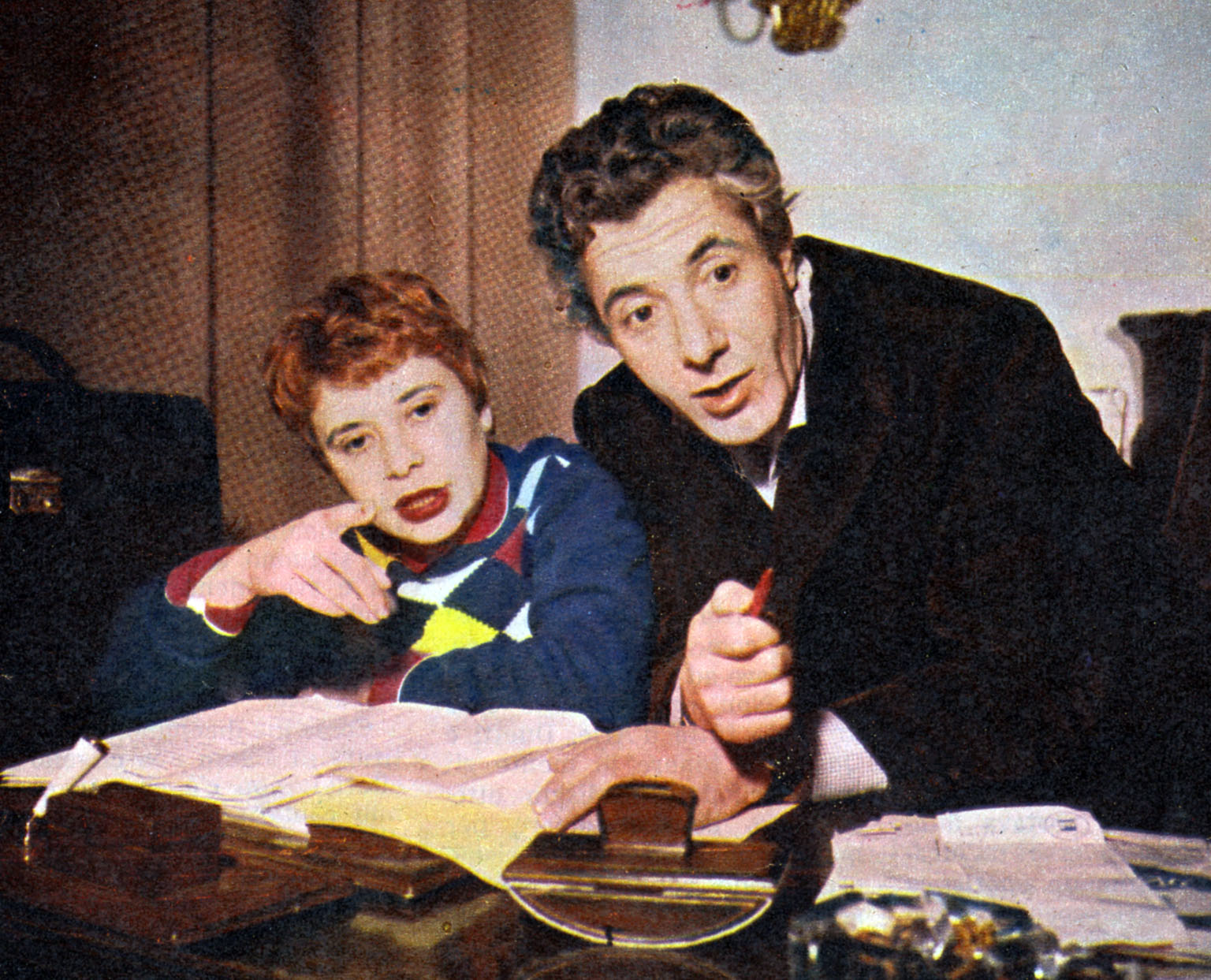
Tedeschi (right) with Bice Valori in 1957

- The Peddler and the Lady (1943) - Un giocatore al tavolo di baccarat (uncredited)
- The Steamship Owner (1951) - Il pianista
- We Two Alone (1952) - The Staff Administrator
- Public Opinion (1954) - Egisto Bianchi
- The Last Five Minutes (1955) - Il pianista
- Bravissimo (1955) - Theatre impresario
- I pappagalli (1955) - The painter
- Susanna Whipped Cream (1957) - Gianluca
- Femmine tre volte (1957) - Vassili
- Carmela è una bambola (1958) - The Psychoanalyst
- Caporale di giornata (1958) - Colonel Felice
- The Law (1959) - Primo disoccupato
- Non perdiamo la testa (1959) - Prof. Daniele
- La cento chilometri (1959) - The Race Walker Friend of Buscaglione
- The Employee (1960) - Director
- Carthage in Flames (1960) - Eleo
- Adua and Friends (1960) - Stefano
- The Fascist (1961) - Arcangelo Bardacci
- Madame (1961) - Roquet
- Three Fables of Love (1962) - Valerio (segment "Le lièvre et le tortue")
- Gli eroi del doppio gioco (1962) - Pietro Malaguti
- Destination Rome (1963) - A crook
- Ro.Go.Pa.G. (1963) - The psychiatrist (segment "Illibatezza") (uncredited)
- I 4 tassisti (1963) - L'uomo in blue (segment "L'uomo in blue")
- Un marito in condominio (1963) - Ulisse
- The Mona Lisa Has Been Stolen (1966) - Gaspard, l'inspecteur de Police parisien
- How I Learned to Love Women (1966) - Il direttore - marito di Ilde
- Il marito è mio e l'ammazzo quando mi pare (1968) - Embalmer
- Gli infermieri della mutua (1969) - Prof. Giacomo Garinoni
- Brancaleone at the Crusades (1970) - Pantaleo
- Secret Fantasy (1971) - Orchestra Conductor
- Io non vedo, tu non parli, lui non sente (1971) - Police Commissioner Salvatore Mazzia
- Hector the Mighty (1972) - Priamo
- L'uccello migratore (1972) - Onorevole Michele Pomeraro
- Frankenstein - Italian Style (1975) - Dr. Frankenstein
- Mimì Bluette... fiore del mio giardino (1976) - Maurice
- Sex with a Smile II (1976) - Silvestri (segment "La visita")
- Il mostro (1977)
- La presidentessa (1977) - Judge Agostino Tricanti
- Dr. Jekyll Likes Them Hot (1979) - James / Jeeves
- Hurricane Rosy (1979) - Le Comte / The Earl
- Prestazione straordinaria (1994) - Grisaglia
- Long Live Freedom (2013) - Furlan

== See also ==
- List of centenarians (actors, filmmakers and entertainers)
