= Giovanni Lombardo Radice =

Italian actor (1954–2023)

- Born: 23 September 1954; Rome, Italy
- Died: 27 April 2023 (aged 68); Rome, Italy
- Other names: John Morghen
- Occupation: Actor
- Years active: 1980–2023
- Parent(s): Lucio Lombardo-Radice (father); Adele Maria Jemolo (mother)
- Relatives: Giuseppe Lombardo Radice (grandfather); Gemma Harasim (grandmother); Pietro Ingrao (uncle)

Giovanni Lombardo Radice (23 September 1954 – 27 April 2023) was an Italian actor, screenwriter and theatre director. He was best known to film audiences for his roles in horror films, several of which became cult classics. He was sometimes credited under the stage name John Morghen.

== Early life ==
Radice was born in Rome in September 1954, into a prominent local family. His father, Lucio, was a mathematician and a leading member of the Communist Party. His paternal grandfather was the pedagogist Giuseppe Lombardo Radice. His uncle, Pietro Ingrao, was a prominent politician, journalist, and World War II partisan. He was the first Communist to become President of the Italian Chamber of Deputies, a position he held from 1976 to 1979.

Radice studied to become a ballet dancer, but his career was sidelined by a back injury in his teenage years. After brief stint as a physical therapist, he decided to become an actor.

== Career ==
After classical training, he started a Shakespearean company called The Swan Company (named after The Swan) at the age of 19. He was a successful stage actor for several years, but by his account was "a terrible administrator" and struggled financially. After a chance meeting with Ruggero Deodato's mother-in-law, he became acquainted with the director, and after a successful audition was cast in his 1980 horror film The House on the Edge of the Park.

Throughout the 1980s, Radice appeared in many Italian cult films such as Cannibal Apocalypse (1980), City of the Living Dead (1980), Stage Fright (1987) and The Church (1989).

Radice is best known for his villainous roles in Italian horror films, and notably for the spectacular and gruesome death scenes his characters semi-regularly fall victim to. In several interviews, he reportedly stated that he wished he had never portrayed Mike Logan in Cannibal Ferox, criticizing the movie for being both fascist and racist and abusive towards animals. After his family criticized him for using his family name to create incredibly violent films, Radice adopted the stage name John Morghen, taking the anglicized form of his first name (Giovanni becomes John) and using his maternal grandmother's maiden name as his last name (Morghen).

Radice’s last public appearance was at the 2023 Romford Horror Film Festival alongside Silvia Collatina.

== Personal life ==
Lombardo Radice was married to actress Alessandra Panelli (b. 1957) from 1989 until his death. They had one child. Lombardo Radice was trilingual, fluent in English and French as well as his native Italian.

The writer Marco Lombardo Radice was his elder brother. Radice often posted texts criticizing social injustice, capitalism and corruption in Italy.

He wrote about having a cocaine addiction when younger.

== Death ==
Lombardo Radice died on 27 April 2023, at the age of 68, the same day as his Cannibal Apocalypse co-star Ramiro Oliveros.

== Filmography ==
Year	Title	Role	Notes
1980	Cannibal Apocalypse (a.k.a. Apocalypse Domani)	Charlie Bukowski	
1980	City of the Living Dead (a.k.a. The Gates of Hell)	Bob	
1980	The House on the Edge of the Park	Ricky	
1981	Cannibal Ferox (a.k.a. Make Them Die Slowly)	Mike Logan	
1982	Cannibal Love		
1984	Deadly Impact	Al	
1985	Big Deal After 20 Years	Il giovane elegante	
1986	The American Bride		
1987	Stage Fright (1987, a.k.a. Deliria)	Brett	
1987	Eleven Days, Eleven Nights	Brett	
1987	Phantom of Death (1988, a.k.a. Un delitto poco comune)	Father Giuliano	
1988	La parola segreta		
1989	The Church (a.k.a. La Chiesa)	Reverend	
1991	The Devil's Daughter (a.k.a. La Setta)	Martin Romero	
1992	Body Puzzle	Morangi	
1992	Ricky & Barabba	Gestore dell'albergo Relais	
2000	Padre Pio: Between Heaven and Earth	Pope Pius XII	TV Movie
2000	Paul the Apostle	Herod Antipas	TV Movie
2001	Honolulu Baby	Amministratore Delegato	
2002	The Soul Keeper	Zorin	
2002	Gangs of New York	Mr. Legree	
2006	The Omen	Father Spiletto	
2007	The Hideout	Vincent Natali	
2009	House of Flesh Mannequins	Mr. Roeg	
2010	A Day of Violence	Hopper	
2011	The Reverend	Almighty	
2012	The Infliction	Lieutenant Lorenzo	
2013	Long Live Freedom		
2015	The Three Sisters	Arthur Lehman	
2015	Violent Shit: The Movie	Professor Vassago	
2016	Moderation	Johnny - the Italian Actor	
2017	Una gita a Roma	Victor	
2018	Lycanimator	Narrator	
2018	Rabbia furiosa	Ranieri	
2019	Beyond Fury	Ivan Lenzivitch	
2019	Everybloody's End	Steiner	
2021	Baphomet	Henrik Brandr	
2023	The Well	Lisa's father	(final film role)
