= Editori Riuniti =

Italian publishing house

- Predecessor: Edizioni Rinascita, Edizioni di Cultura Sociale
- Founded: 1953
- Country of origin: Italy
- Headquarters location: Rome
- Official website: editoririuniti.it

Editori Riuniti is an Italian publishing house based in Rome that publishes books and magazines on the history of socialism, socialist thought, physics and mathematics theory, and the history of Central and Eastern Europe and the Balkans.

== History ==
Editori Riuniti's old logo

Editori Riuniti was founded in 1953 by the merger of the Italian Communist Party's two existing publishing houses, Valentino Gerratana's Edizioni Rinascita and Roberto Bonchio's Edizioni di Cultura Sociale. Bonchio became head of the new publishing house and initiated, in its first decade, a period of expansion. Editori Riuniti began publishing its flagship magazines, which were initially edited by Bonchio and Gerratana until Bruno Munari contributed to their graphic design. The publishing house also began important partnerships with European intellectuals like Maurice Dobb, Louis Althusser, Eric Hobsbawm, and Roberto Longhi. In the 1970s, Editori Riuniti published the Opere complete di Marx e Engels and the 11-volume encyclopedia Ulisse, under the direction of Lucio Lombardo-Radice.

The publishing house entered a period of economic crisis in the 1980s that lasted until the formation of the Editori Riuniti University Press in 2007, in 2014 the company was reunified under the name of Editori Riuniti.

== Publishing ==
Editori Riuniti published the complete works of both Karl Marx and Friedrich Engels in Italian.
