= Pisacane =

Pisacane is a surname. Notable people with the surname include:

- Carlo Pisacane (1818–1857), Italian patriot and socialist
- Carlo Pisacane (actor) (1889–1974), Italian actor
- Fabio Pisacane (born 1986), Italian football player and coach
