= Big Deal After 20 Years =

1985 film

Big Deal After 20 Years (I soliti ignoti vent'anni dopo)
- Film poster
- Directed by: Amanzio Todini
- Written by: Suso Cecchi d'Amico; Agenore Incrocci; Furio Scarpelli; Amanzio Todini
- Produced by: Carlo Cucchi; Silvia D'Amico Bendico
- Starring: Marcello Mastroianni; Tiberio Murgia; Clelia Rondinella; Gina Rovere; Francesco De Rosa; Giorgio Gobbi; Concetta Barra; Vittorio Gassman
- Cinematography: Pasqualino De Santis
- Edited by: Ruggero Mastroianni
- Music by: Nino Rota
- Distributed by: Medusa Film
- Release date: 25 December 1985
- Running time: 99 minutes
- Country: Italy
- Language: Italian

Big Deal After 20 Years (Italian: I soliti ignoti vent'anni dopo) is a 1985 Italian comedy film directed by Amanzio Todini. It is the sequel to Big Deal on Madonna Street and Audace colpo dei soliti ignoti.

== Plot ==
After several years spent in prison for a hit gone wrong, Tiberio is released to find a profoundly changed Rome. He goes home to find his wife Teresa now living with a house painter who pays her rent in exchange for his wife's "company." When he tries to retrieve his camera equipment, with which he hopes to begin a new career, he learns that Teresa sold it to pay for his lawyer. When he attempts to reconcile with his wife, he is brutally thrown out of the house by her new man. Tiberio sleeps inside an abandoned car in the junkyard in front of his old house.

Meanwhile, Tiberio's adult son Brunino has returned from Milan and immediately interrupts his father's outdated robbery attempts. Now fully resigned to resuming his old business, Tiberio goes to visit his old friend Ferribotte, now working at a gas station, to ask him where to find Peppe il Pantera. There he also meets Augusto Cruciani, son of Dante Cruciani who twenty years earlier had instructed Tiberio and his gang on the methods of breaking into a safe. Augusto is an accomplice of Ferribotte in the stolen medicine trade. Tiberio attempts to find a place in Peppe's new moneymaking scheme of transferring money from Yugoslavia on behalf of Don Vincenzo or "the Banker." He is rejected due to the need for a middle aged woman to play the part. In a desperate attempt to be included, Tiberio shows up dressed as a woman. After discovering the disguise, Peppe bursts into wild laughter which, due to his advanced age, induces a light heart attack and subsequent hospitalization with Augusto as his caretaker.

In his guilt over his friend's sickness, Tiberio decides to take over for Peppe and lead the operation. He enlists Augusto to supply the house in Tivoli, the car they will drive across the border, and Augusto's mother-in-law Marisa and her newborn baby. He recruits Brunino to help with the driving and Ferribotte who intends to start a new life away from his demanding sister. The group sets off for Trieste where they have an appointment with some Northerners to pick up the money to take across the border. After a series of difficulties, including the disappearance of Marisa and the arrival of the baby's father who threatens to give the police their license plate number, they finally arrive in Trieste. At the border, they evade detection by border police thanks to Brunino's cunning in hiding the money. After delivering the money, they are told to wait until the afternoon to get back on the road.

While in Yugoslavia, Brunina, who had struggled with his lack of sexual interest, and Marisa fall in love. During the trip back to Italy, Tiberio realizes that the seat of their vehicle has been changed. After dropping Brunino and Marisa at the bus station Tiberio and Ferribotte discover cocaine hidden under the seat. They are met by the Banker, who leaves them their money and takes the vehicle with the drugs. Tiberio is furious as he realizes that they were actually meant to deliver drugs not money. As Tiberio and Ferribotte return to Rome by train, the bus with drugs is stopped by the carabinieri. The driver tries to escape but is shot, while the Banker gets away in another car leaving the drugs behind. Back on the train, Tiberio and Ferribotte reminisce about the old days (with scenes from Big Deal on Madonna Street) and express regret at some of their past misdeeds. They eventually decide to leave Rome as they realize it has changed far too much for them to stay. They retire to a small town outside the city where they spend the rest of their lives in peace.

At Peppe's birthday party, Tiberio, Ferribotte and Peppe celebrate the success of the operation. Just as Peppe expresses his happiness, one of the traffickers shows up and shoots him dead.

== Cast ==
- Marcello Mastroianni - Tiberio
- Vittorio Gassman - Peppe il pantera
- Tiberio Murgia - Ferribotte
- Clelia Rondinella - Marisa
- Giorgio Gobbi - Brunino
- Gina Rovere - Teresa
- Francesco De Rosa - Augusto
- Alessandra Panelli - La moglie di Augusto
- Alessandro Gassman
- Giovanni Lombardo Radice - Il giovane elegante
- Pasquale Africano - Primo calabrese
- Rita Savagnone - La sorella di Ferribotte
- Concetta Barra - La signora Italia
