= Adua and Her Friends =

1960 film

Adua and Her Friends (Adua e le compagne)
- Directed by: Antonio Pietrangeli
- Written by: Ruggero Maccari, Antonio Pietrangeli, Ettore Scola, Tullio Pinelli
- Produced by: Moris Ergas
- Starring: Sandra Milo, Marcello Mastroianni, Simone Signoret
- Cinematography: Armando Nannuzzi
- Edited by: Eraldo Da Roma
- Music by: Piero Piccioni
- Distributed by: Titanus
- Release date: 3 September 1960
- Running time: 106 minutes
- Country: Italy
- Language: Italian

Adua and Her Friends (Italian: Adua e le compagne), also known as Hungry For Love, is a 1960 Italian film directed by Antonio Pietrangeli with a collaborative screenplay by the film's director together with Ruggero Maccari, Ettore Scola and Tullio Pinelli. The movie is about four prostitutes who start a restaurant after their brothel is shut down by the Merlin law, which made brothels illegal in Italy.

== Plot ==
In 1958, the Merlin law made brothels illegal in Italy. Adua, Lolita, Marilina and Milly are four prostitutes whose brothel in Rome is shut down. Under Adua's leadership, they pool their savings, two million lire apiece, to open a restaurant on the outskirts, which will be a cover for an illegal brothel. They rent a run-down building and hire workmen to fix it up but, when they apply for a permit to open the restaurant, their application is rejected because of their history of prostitution. One of Adua's former customers, Ercoli, agrees to buy the building and use his connections to get the permit in his name, in return for a rent of one million lire a month.

The restaurant turns out to be unexpectedly successful, and the women effectively abandon their plans to offer sexual services and start to lead respectable lives. Marilina brings her young son to live with her and Milly falls in love and plans to marry. But the restaurant doesn't earn as much as they could make as a brothel, and they can't pay Ercoli his rent. Ercoli gives them an ultimatum: start working as prostitutes again, and pay him his rent, or he will kick them out in 24 hours. When Ercoli returns, Adua refuses to pay and humiliates him, and he leaves. In revenge, he has them all arrested for prostitution. Their pictures appear in the newspapers and their respectable lives are destroyed. Adua, who has sworn never to suffer the fate of a worn-out old prostitute, ends up working in the streets again. In the final scene, on a dismal rainy night, she is rejected in favor of a younger woman.

== Cast ==
- Simone Signoret: Adua Giovannetti
- Sandra Milo: Lolita
- Emmanuelle Riva: Marilina
- Gina Rovere: Milly
- Claudio Gora: Ercoli
- Ivo Garrani: Avvocato
- Gianrico Tedeschi: Stefano
- Antonio Rais: Emilio
- Duilio D'Amore: Frate Michele
- Valeria Fabrizi: Fosca la bionda
- Luciana Gilli: Dora
- Enzo Maggio: Calypso
- Domenico Modugno: Himself
- Marcello Mastroianni: Piero Silvagni

== Sources ==
- Salvatori, Alessandra. "Adua e le compagne – Recensione DVD – scheda, trailer, foto, dvd". RECENSIONE DVD Adua e le compagne. Archived from the original on April 27, 2006.
