= Il raccomandato di ferro =

- Directed by: Marcello Baldi
- Written by: Marcello Baldi; Giorgio Bontempi; Riccardo Ghione
- Story by: Augusto Gotti Lega
- Produced by: Achille Piazzi
- Starring: Mario Riva; Franca Marzi; Alessandra Panaro
- Cinematography: Carlo Carlini
- Music by: Teo Usuelli
- Release date: 1959
- Language: Italian

Il raccomandato di ferro is a 1959 Italian comedy film directed by Marcello Baldi and starring Mario Riva. It grossed 89,3 million lire at the Italian box office.

== Plot ==
Augusto Zinconi is a former Roman usher who found employment in an oil industry in Mestre thanks to a false letter of recommendation from Undersecretary Goffredo Monaci. Laggard and libertine, after bribing the doorkeeper of the plant to get his card stamped in his absence, he manages to escape dismissal by claiming to be a longtime friend of the undersecretary, who has meanwhile become a powerful minister, the only person who could save the industry from bankruptcy. He was then sent to Rome to have the important file signed by the minister; helped by luck, he manages to obtain the document, already signed previously, without meeting Monaci. Returning to Mestre as a triumph, he obtained new and greater positions, until one day the minister's visit to the industry was announced, putting Zinconi and Monaci in front of each other for the first time.

== Cast ==
- Mario Riva as Augusto Zinconi
- Franca Marzi as Fedora
- Alessandra Panaro as Wilma
- Aroldo Tieri as "Penombra"
- Edy Vessel as Miss Jane
- Augusto Gotti Lega as The General Director
- Roberto Risso as Massimo Conte
- Amedeo Nazzari as Minister Monaci
- Enzo Garinei as Mingotto
- Tiberio Murgia as Nicola
- Carlo Pisacane as Luigi
- Alberto Rabagliati as The Milanese Businessman
- Ileana Ghione
- Ignazio Leone
- Toni Ucci
- Nietta Zocchi
