= Giuseppe Lombardo Radice =

Italian pedagogist and philosopher

Giuseppe Lombardo Radice (Catania, June 24, 1879 - Cortina d'Ampezzo, August 16, 1938) was an Italian pedagogist and philosopher.

== Early life and career ==
He was born in Catania on June 24, 1879 (but his birth was registered late, on June 28) to Luciano Lombardo and Nunziata Radice, the third son of seven children. He began his secondary studies at the Spedalieri high school in Catania; then, after his father's transfer to the maritime customs of Messina, he completed them in the Maurolico gymnasium-high school in 1897. After high school he won the competition for internal student at the Scuola Normale Superiore di Pisa, where in 1899 he obtained a licentiate in literature and philosophy with honors for his thesis An Italian historian of the French Revolution with A. Crivellucci. He graduated in philosophy from the University of Pisa in 1901, earning a scholarship for the Institute of Higher Studies of Florence, where he obtained his diploma in 1902. A year later he obtained the qualification to teach philosophy in Pisa. He remained in Florence until the end of 1903, starting his teaching experience at the renowned Barnabite college " Alla Querce"; at the same time he became interested in a school for orphans of sailors, where he spent most of his free time refining his vocation for pedagogy.

In November 1903 he won the competition to teach in the lower gymnasiums, taught at Adernò (from 1929 renamed Adrano), Catania (1903–04), and at Arpino (1904–05); then, having won the competition to teach pedagogy, he was transferred first to the boys normal school of Foggia (1905–06), then to Palermo (1906–07 and 1907–08) and to Messina (1908). After the violent earthquake that destroyed this city on December 28 he was sent to Catania.

Lombardo Radice was first a middle school teacher, publishing some studies on Plato, in Foggia and Palermo, where in 1907 he founded the magazine "Nuovi Doveri" with Giovanni Gentile. Between 1911 and 1922, he taught pedagogy at the University of Catania.

== Fascist period ==
Subsequently, in the years 1922-1924, during the fascist period, reporting directly to the then Minister of Public Education Giovanni Gentile, he provided for the drafting of ministerial programs for primary schools, providing, among other things, for the use of regional languages in teaching texts, (the program From Dialect to Language). However, this was not translated into effective practice, given the unifying and leveling emphasis of fascist ideology.

He collaborated with Gentile on the Italian translation of Immanuel Kant's Critique of Pure Reason.

His work cannot be associated with fascist ideology, so much so that when Fascism openly revealed its authoritarian nature with the murder of Giacomo Matteotti in 1924, he went on to teach pedagogy at the l'Istituto superiore di magistero in Rome until 1928. For having abandoned his collaboration with the fascist government, he underwent a period of marginalization which led him to withdraw from active politics, even though he never openly distanced himself from fascism.

In 1931 he took the oath of loyalty to fascism imposed on university professors, on pain of losing their chair and being excluded from teaching, confessing to De Sanctis: "It will shame all my work as a writer and thinker, but I cannot leave my young sons penniless." So he turned to the dissemination of a new pedagogical address with the magazine L'educazione nazionale. This pedagogical approach was inspired by the work of the great American philosopher Ralph Waldo Emerson, considered by Lombardo Radice to be the "prophet of new education". He admired and supported Maria Boschetti-Alberti of Bedigliora.

== Personal life ==
By his wife Gemma Harasim, a teacher from Fiume, he had three children: Giuseppina, Laura, a partisan and wife of Pietro Ingrao, and the mathematician Lucio.
