= I piaceri dello scapolo =

1960 film

- Directed by: Giulio Petroni
- Written by: Angelo D'Alessandro; Marcello Fondato; Ugo Guerra; Ruggero Maccari
- Starring: Sylva Koscina; Mario Carotenuto.
- Cinematography: Alvaro Mancori
- Edited by: Nino Baragli
- Music by: Armando Trovajoli
- Distributed by: Lux Film
- Release date: 1960
- Running time: 96 minutes
- Country: Italy
- Language: Italian

I piaceri dello scapolo is a 1960 Italian film directed by Giulio Petroni and starring Sylva Koscina and Mario Carotenuto.

== Plot ==
Two bachelors who are no longer young rent a garçonnière. Their enthusiasm lasts very little, however, as all their attempts to use it to bring dates there appear to be useless.

== Cast ==
- Sylva Koscina as Eby
- Mario Carotenuto as Mario
- Memmo Carotenuto as Memmo
- Gina Rovere as Franca
- Andrea Checchi as Eng. Rocchetti
- Marisa Merlini as Evelina
- Nanda Primavera as Evelina's mother
- Mario Passante as the friar
- Carlo Pisacane as the doorman
- Graziella Granata as Gianna

== Censorship ==
When I piaceri dello scapolo was first released in Italy in 1960 the Committee for the Theatrical Review of the Italian Ministry of Cultural Heritage and Activities rated it as VM16: not suitable for children under 16. In addition the committee imposed the following revisions: 1) the sequences in which the prostitute Franca appears half-dressed will be shortened as much as possible without disrupting the plot; 2) the scenes in which she takes on alluring poses and behaviors typical of her trade will be definitely deleted; 3) the scenes in which the priest is begging and in which the priest is speaking to Memmo (the latter to be shortened as much as possible) will be deleted. The first two scenes mentioned are considered immoral and offensive to decency, the other ones are considered offensive to religion. The official document number is: 30635, it was signed on 22 February 1960 by Minister Domenico Magrì.
