= Carlo Pisacane (actor) =

Italian actor (1889–1974)

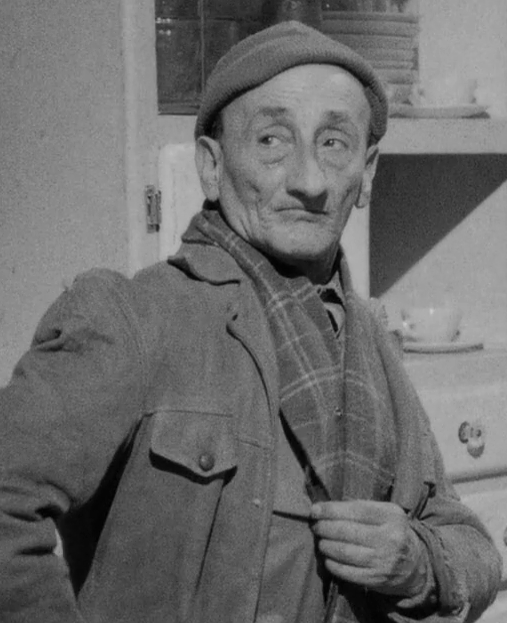
- Pisacane in Big Deal on Madonna Street (1958)
- Born: 2 February 1889; Naples, Italy
- Died: 9 June 1974 (aged 85); Rome, Italy
- Occupation: Actor
- Years active: 1926–1972

Carlo Pisacane (2 February 1889 – 9 June 1974) was an Italian actor who performed in over 70 films, including spaghetti Westerns like Death Rides a Horse (1968) and parodies like For a Few Dollars Less (1966). He is best remembered for his appearances in comedic classics, such as Big Deal on Madonna Street and its sequel Audace colpo dei soliti ignoti, in which he played the elderly and gluttonous small-time crook Capannelle. He also is known for his role as the miserly Jewish merchant Abacuc in For Love and Gold.

== Selected filmography ==
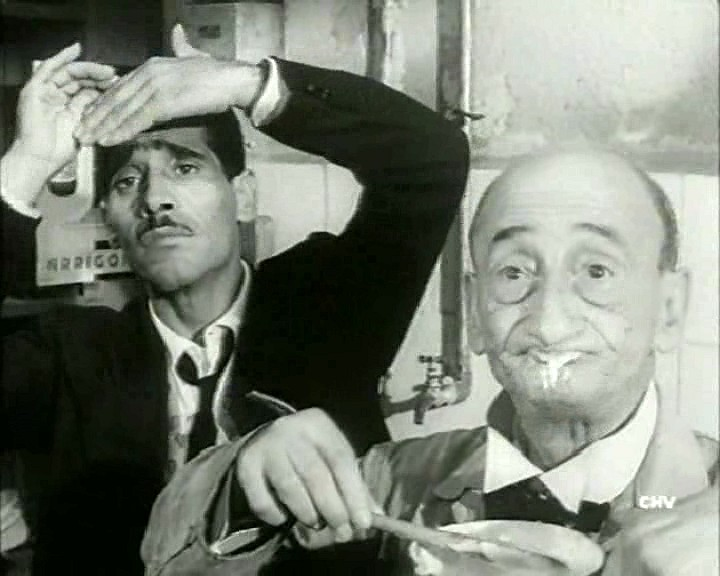
Carlo Pisacane (right) with Tiberio Murgia in Audace colpo dei soliti ignoti (1959)

- The Table of the Poor (1932)
- Paisà (1946)
- Alarm Bells (1949)
- The City Stands Trial (1952)
- A Thief in Paradise (1952)
- Naples Sings (1953)
- The Miller's Beautiful Wife (1955)
- The Man Who Wagged His Tail (1957)
- Big Deal on Madonna Street (1958)
- Men and Noblemen (1959)
- The Sheriff (1959)
- Il raccomandato di ferro (1959)
- Prepotenti più di prima (1959)
- Piece of the Sky (1959)
- El Lazarillo de Tormes (1959)
- Audace colpo dei soliti ignoti (1959)
- The Traffic Policeman (1960)
- The Passionate Thief (1960)
- I piaceri dello scapolo (1960)
- Toto, Fabrizi and the Young People Today (1960)
- The Joy of Living (1961)
- The Italian Brigands (1961)
- Toto and Peppino Divided in Berlin (1962)
- Il mio amico Benito (1962)
- Colossus of the Arena (1962)
- Samson Against the Sheik (1962)
- The Shortest Day (1962)
- Tiger of the Seven Seas (1962)
- Gli onorevoli (1963)
- Le motorizzate (1963)
- Questo pazzo, pazzo mondo della canzone (1965)
- Made in Italy (1965)
- For Love and Gold (1966)
- For a Few Dollars Less (1966)
- After the Fox (1966)
- The Saint Lies in Wait (1966)
- Treasure of San Gennaro (1966)
- Operation St. Peter's (1967)
- Wrath of God (1968)
- The Archangel (1969)
