= The Italian Brigands =

- Directed by: Mario Camerini
- Produced by: Mario Cecchi Gori
- Cinematography: Mario Montuori
- Edited by: Giuliana Attenni
- Music by: Francesco Lavagnino
- Distributed by: Dino De Laurentiis
- Release date: 1962
- Running time: 108 minutes
- Country: Italy
- Language: Italian

I briganti italiani (internationally released as The Italian Brigands and Seduction of the South) is a 1962 Italian comedy-drama film directed by Mario Camerini. It was shot in Cerreto Sannita.

== Plot ==
During the Italian unification the revolutionist Santo Carbone abducts Colonel Breviglieri of the Piedmontese army.

== Cast ==
- Vittorio Gassman: 'O Caporale
- Ernest Borgnine: Sante Carbone
- Rosanna Schiaffino: Mariantonia
- Katy Jurado: Assunta Carbone
- Bernard Blier: Colonel Breviglieri
- Micheline Presle: La Marchesa
- Akim Tamiroff: 'O Zingaro
- Philippe Leroy: 'O Zelluso
- Mario Feliciani: Don Ramiro
- Carlo Taranto: 'O Scarrafone
- Carlo Pisacane: Filuccio
- Guido Celano: Muso
- Carlo Giuffrè: Lieutenant
