= The Saint Lies in Wait =

1966 film

- Film poster
- Directed by: Christian-Jaque
- Written by: Henri Jeanson; Jean Ferry; Christian-Jaque; Marcel Julian
- Based on: Le Saint prend l'affût by Leslie Charteris
- Produced by: Jean-Paul Guibert
- Starring: Jean Marais; Jess Hahn; Jean Yanne
- Cinematography: Pierre Petit
- Edited by: Jacques Desagneaux
- Music by: Gérard Calvi
- Production companies: Intermondia Films; T.C. Productions; Société Nouvelle de Cinématographie; Medusa Distribuzione
- Distributed by: Société Nouvelle de Cinématographie; Medusa Distribuzione
- Release date: 26 October 1966 (France)
- Running time: 90 minutes
- Countries: France; Italy
- Language: French
- Box office: 1,329,177 admissions (France)

The Saint Lies in Wait (French: Le Saint prend l'affût, Italian: Il santo prende la mira) is a 1966 French-Italian comedy crime film directed by Christian-Jaque and starring Jean Marais, Jess Hahn and Jean Yanne. It is an adaptation of a French only Simon Templar novel Le Saint prend l'affût (1960), credited to Leslie Charteris, but in fact ghostwritten. It was shot at the Billancourt Studios in Paris. The film's sets were designed by the art director Jean Mandaroux. At the time the British television series The Saint starring Roger Moore was at the height of its popularity.

== Synopsis ==
Simon Templar is staying at a Scottish castle with his friend Hoppy Uniatz, but is called into action when another friend Oscar Chartier involves him in a complex scheme to steal secret documents. His adventures take him to Paris and Sicily and he becomes the protector of Oscar's daughter Sophie.

== Cast ==
- Jean Marais as Simon Templar
- Jess Hahn as Hoppy Uniatz
- Jean Yanne as Mueller-Strasse
- Danièle Évenou as Sophie Chartier
- Raffaella Carrà as Mrs Anita Pavone
- Tiberio Murgia as Tonio Cotone
- Henri Virlogeux as Oscar Chartier
- Claudio Gora as Cesare Pavone
- Nerio Bernardi as esare Pavone, le Commandatore
- Darío Moreno as Slimane
- Maria Brockerhoff as Monica
- Roger Carel as The professor
- Reinhard Kolldehoff as Schmutz
- Henri Guégan as un homme de main allemand
- Carlo Pisacane as Agatino Camaleonte
- Siegfried Rauch as Johnny K.W. Mest
- Katia Christine as Mary

== Production ==
The film was known under the title The Saint Lies in Wait (USA), Il santo prende la mira (Italy), Der Lord mit der MP (West Germany), As Aventuras de o Santo (Portugal).

During the making of the film, the stunt arranger Gil(bert-Yves) Delamare was killed doubling for Marais. A doyen of French stunt drivers, Delamare was skidding a Renault Floride S convertible for a twilight scene on a new patch of freeway when its back axle snapped rolling him and his passengers into a barrier. He was mortally injured when he struck his head on the windscreen. The stunt passengers were thrown clear and survived.

== Bibliography ==
- Curti, Roberto. Riccardo Freda: The Life and Works of a Born Filmmaker. McFarland, 2017.
- Goble, Alan. The Complete Index to Literary Sources in Film. Walter de Gruyter, 1999.
