= A Day of Violence =

- Directed by: Darren Ward
- Written by: Dominic Brunt
- Produced by: Dave Andrews; Ian Andrews; Catherine Friend; Pillinger Kathy; Janet Lush; Malcolm Lush; Maria O'Reilly; Glen Wale; Darren Ward; Terry Ward; Charles Winfield
- Starring: Nick Rendell; Christopher Fosh; Victor D. Thorn; Tina Barnes; Steve Humphrey
- Cinematography: John Raggett
- Edited by: Dave Andrews
- Music by: Dave Andrews
- Production company: Giallo Films
- Distributed by: 101 Films
- Release date: 9 August 2010 (DVD)
- Running time: 91 minutes
- Country: United Kingdom
- Language: English

A Day of Violence is a 2010 British crime thriller film written and directed by Darren Ward, starring Nick Rendell, Christopher Fosh, Victor D. Thorn, Tina Barnes and Steve Humphrey.

== Cast ==
- Nick Rendell as Mitchel
- Christopher Fosh as Chisel
- Victor D. Thorn as Curtis Boswell
- Tina Barnes as Abbi
- Steve Humphrey as Smithy
- Giovanni Lombardo Radice as Hopper
- Peter Rnic as Madock
- Helena Martin as Suzy
- Forbes KB as Noodles
- Pete Morgan as Danny

== Release ==
The film was released on DVD on 9 August 2010.

== Reception ==
James Oster of Arrow in the Head gave the film a score of 3.5/4 and called it a "surprisingly effective low budget action flick that has a huge hard-on for gore and aggression". Oster praised the "solid" cast, highlighting the performances of Rendell and Barnes. Chris Alexander of Fangoria gave the film a score of 3/4 and stated: "The FX are fantastic, and so much fluid is spilled that I had to take a shower afterwards. Every time a performance starts to grate, or a line of dialogue makes you cringe, something sharp tears into something soft and things get hyper-red." Jeremy Blitz of DVD Talk gave the film a score of 3/5 and opined that it is "quite well done, considering its constraints, and offers up an hour and a half of action, thrills, pathos and redemption, of a sort." The Daily Mirror wrote that the film uses violence "less for gratuitous effect but more to provoke reaction in a public numbed by a never-endingly generic raft of staple thrillers."
