= Gina Rovere =

Italian actress (born 1936)

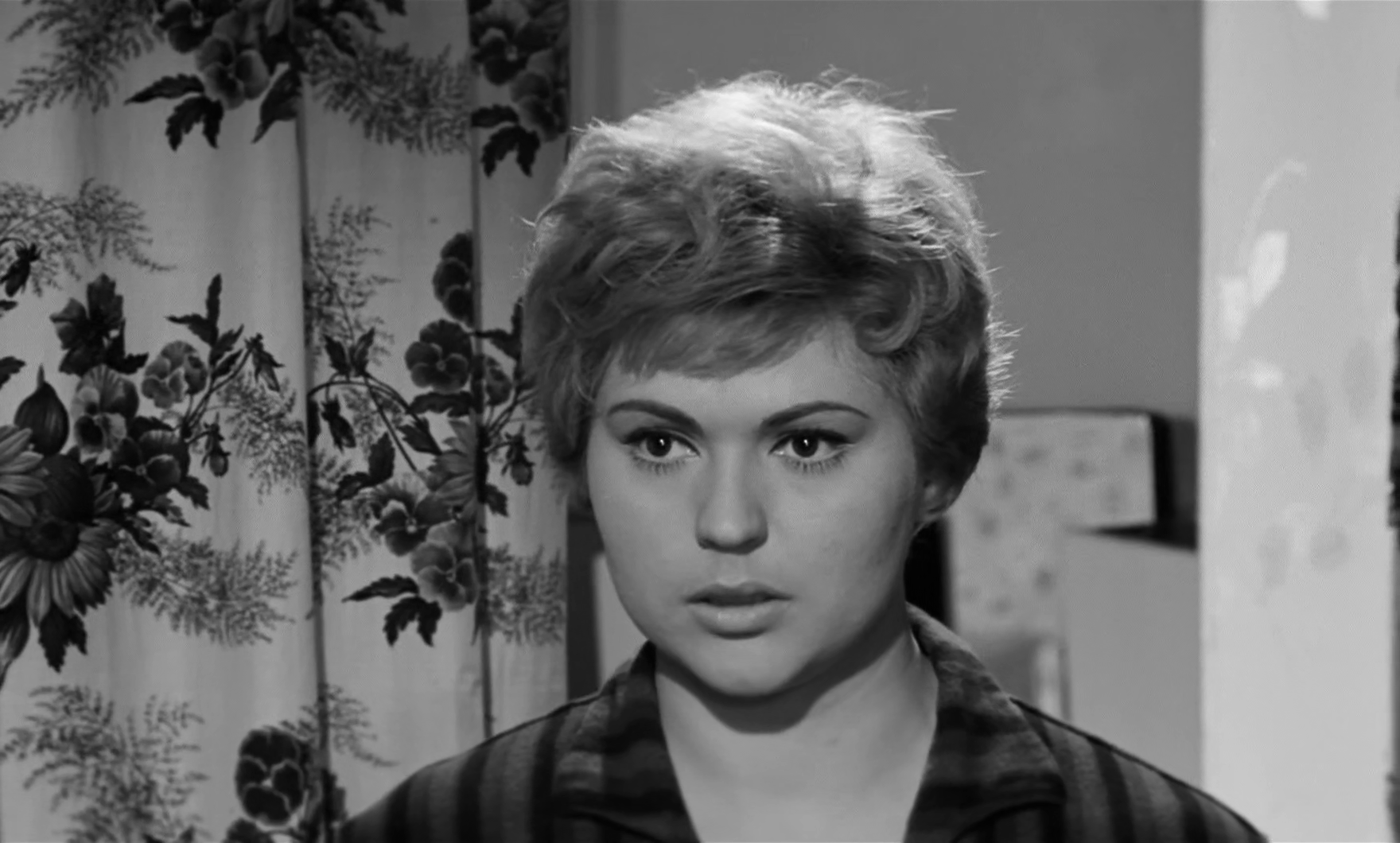
- Rovere in Adua and Her Friends (1960)
- Born: Regina Ciccotti; 18 May 1936 (age 89); Rome, Italy
- Occupation: Actress

Regina Ciccotti (born 18 May 1936), known professionally as Gina Rovere, is an Italian actress.

== Life and career ==
Born in Rome, the daughter of a haulier, at young age Ciccotti studied opera singing with the tenor Arnaldo Luzzi. Noted by a talent agent, she made her professional debut in an avanspettacolo company, and in 1954 she had her breakout replacing Franca Gandolfi as soubrette in the revue Giove in doppiopetto alongside Carlo Dapporto. In films, she was mostly cast in supporting roles; among her best known roles, she played Marcello Mastroianni's wife in Big Deal on Madonna Street by Mario Monicelli, and the prostitute Milly in Antonio Pietrangeli's Adua and Her Friends.

== Selected filmography ==
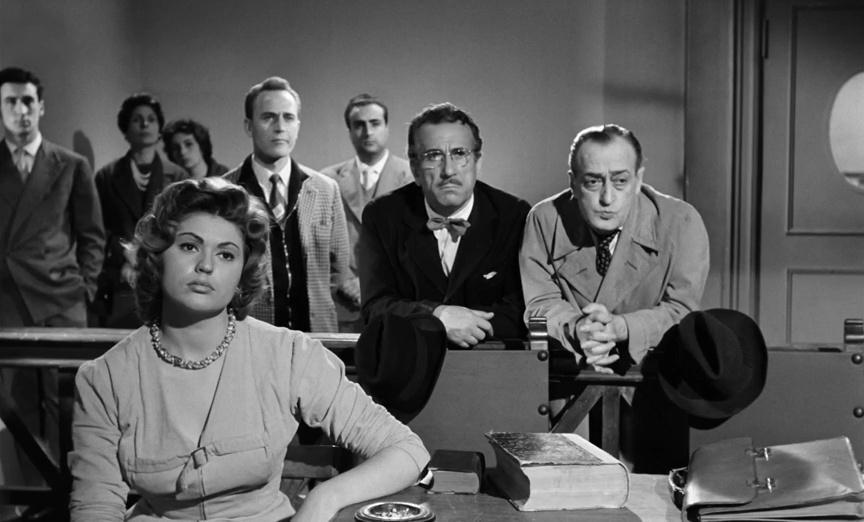
Rovere with Peppino De Filippo and Totò in La cambiale

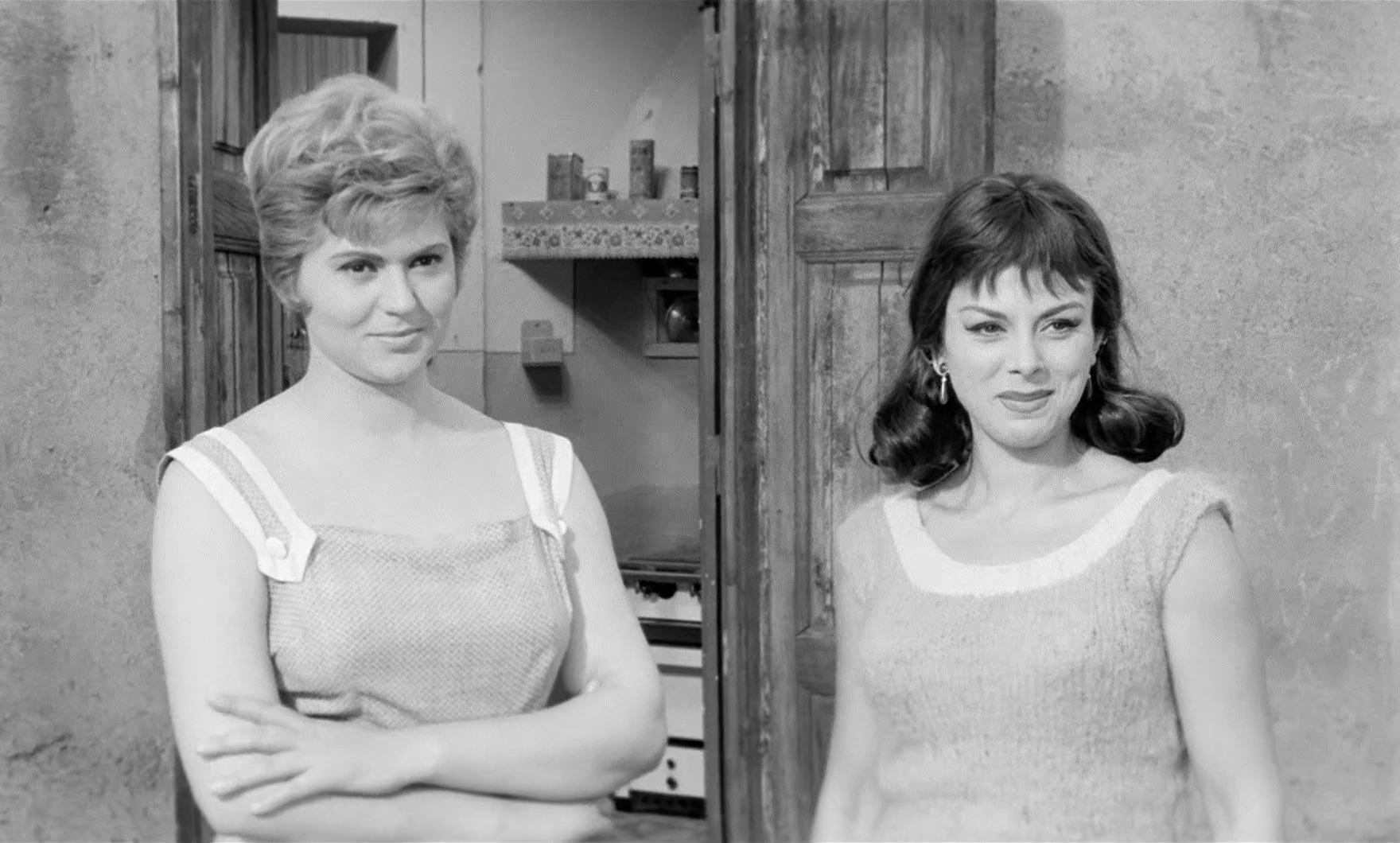
Rovere with Sandra Milo in Adua and Her Friends

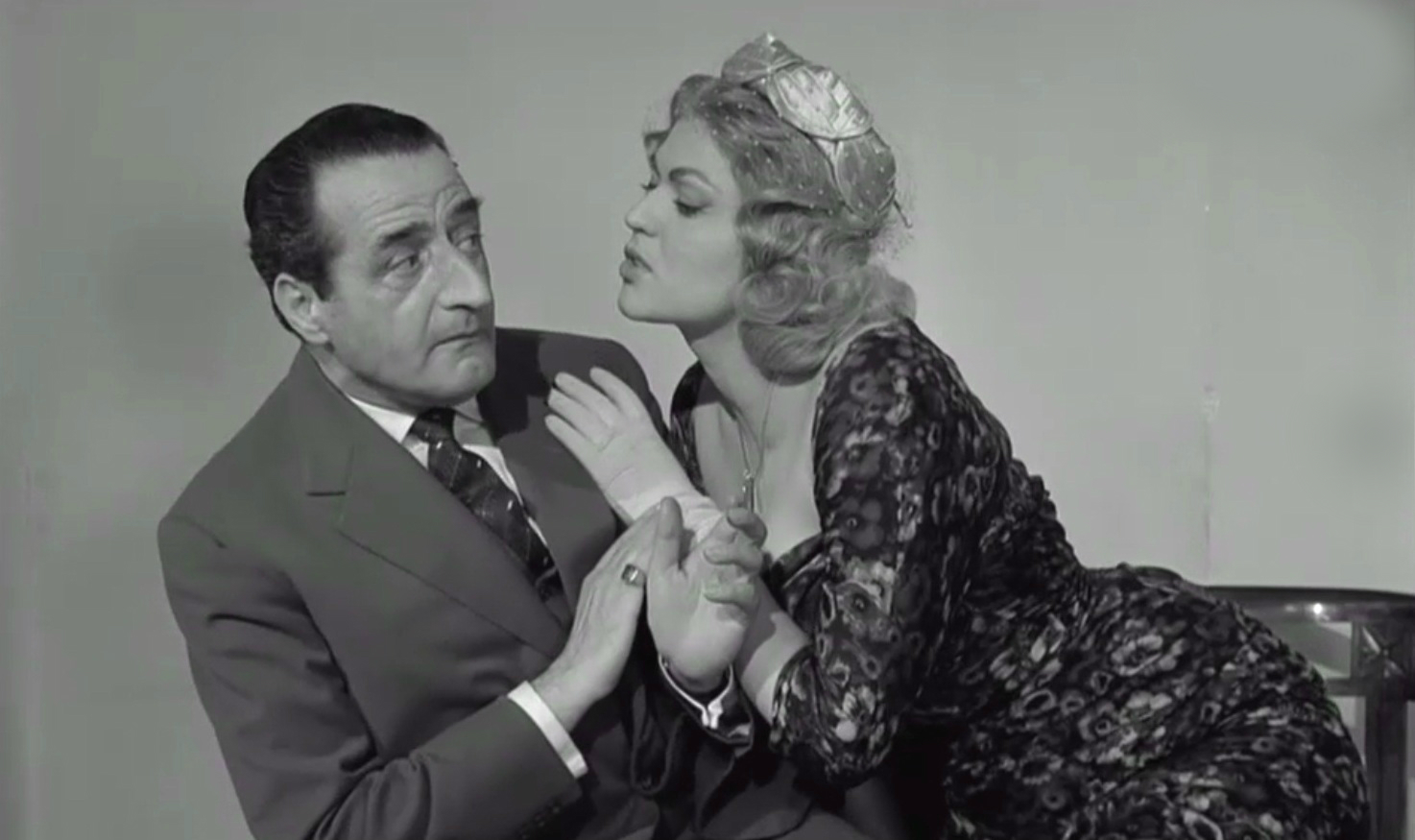
Rovere and Memmo Carotenuto in I piaceri dello scapolo

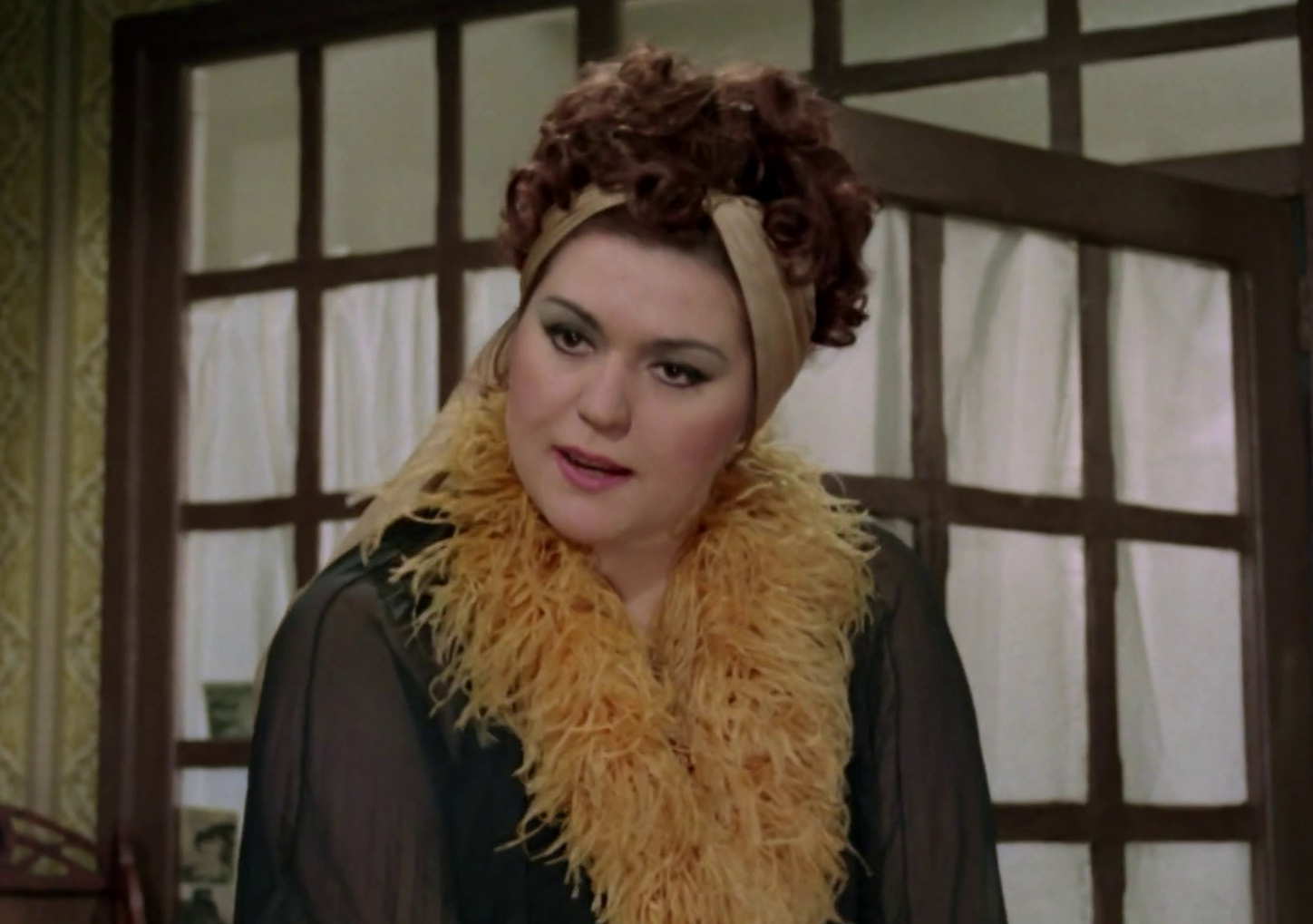
Rovere in The Last Italian Tango

- It Happened in the Park, directed by Gianni Franciolini (1953)
- Are We Men or Corporals?, directed by Camillo Mastrocinque (1955)
- Fathers and Sons, directed by Mario Monicelli (1957)
- Souvenirs d'Italie, directed by Antonio Pietrangeli (1957)
- March's Child, directed by Antonio Pietrangeli (1958)
- Hercules, directed by Pietro Francisci (1958)
- Big Deal on Madonna Street, directed by Mario Monicelli (1958)
- La cambiale, directed by Camillo Mastrocinque (1959)
- ...And the Wild Wild Women, directed by Renato Castellani (1959)
- Adua and Her Friends, directed by Antonio Pietrangeli (1960)
- I piaceri dello scapolo, directed by Giulio Petroni (1960)
- The Passionate Thief, directed by Mario Monicelli (1960)
- Don Camillo: Monsignor, directed by Carmine Gallone (1961)
- The Vengeance of Ursus, directed by Luigi Capuano (1961)
- Colpo gobbo all'italiana (1962) as Gina, directed by Lucio Fulci
- I motorizzati, directed by Camillo Mastrocinque (1962)
- Son of the Circus, directed by Sergio Grieco (1963)
- The Masked Man Against the Pirates, directed by Vertunnio De Angelis (1964)
- How We Got into Trouble with the Army, directed by Lucio Fulci (1965)
- Assassination in Rome, directed by Silvio Amadio (1965)
- Operation Goldsinger, directed by Bruno Corbucci and Giovanni Grimaldi (1965)
- The Dreamer, directed by Massimo Franciosa (1965)
- Latin Lovers, directed by Mario Costa (1965)
- Sugar Colt, directed by Franco Giraldi (1966)
- God Forgives... I Don't!, directed by Giuseppe Colizzi (1967)
- Catch-22, directed by Mike Nichols (1970)
- The Last Italian Tango, directed by Nando Cicero (1974)
- Farfallon, directed by Riccardo Pazzaglia (1974)
- Dog's Heart, directed by Alberto Lattuada (1976)
- Behind Convent Walls, directed by Walerian Borowczyk (1978)
- The Lady of the Camellias, directed by Mauro Bolognini (1981)
- Big Deal After 20 Years, directed by Amanzio Todini (1985)
- Mortacci, directed by Sergio Citti (1989)
- There Was a Castle with Forty Dogs, directed by Duccio Tessari (1990)
- Faccione, directed by Christian De Sica (1991)
- Vietato ai minori, directed by Maurizio Ponzi (1992)
- Mille bolle blu, directed by Leone Pompucci (1993)
- Giovani e belli, directed by Dino Risi (1996)
- Life Is Beautiful, directed by Roberto Benigni (1997)
- Gallo cedrone, directed by Carlo Verdone (1998)
- Bagnomaria, directed by Giorgio Panariello (1999)
- Lightning Strike, directed by Neri Parenti (2012)
- Blessed Madness, directed by Carlo Verdone (2018)
- Lord of the Ants, directed by Gianni Amelio (2022)
