= Paolo Grassi =

Italian theatrical impresario (1919–1981)

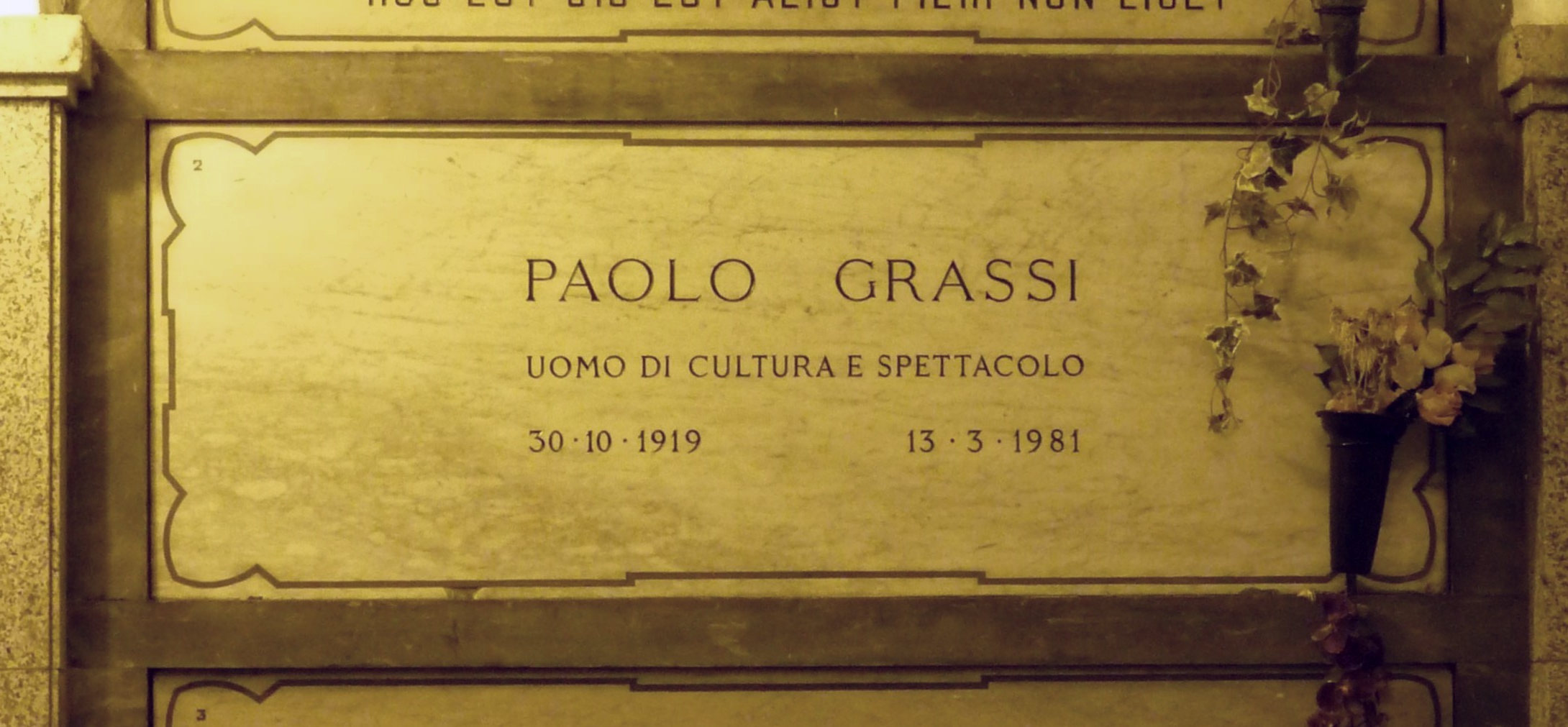
- Grassi's grave at the Monumental Cemetery of Milan, Italy
- Born: 30 October 1919; Milan, Italy
- Died: 14 March 1981 (aged 61); London, England
- Occupation: Theatrical impresario

Paolo Grassi (30 October 1919 – 14 March 1981) was an Italian theatrical impresario, cultural administrator, and journalist. He was a co-founder of the Piccolo Teatro di Milano, Italy’s first permanent public theatre, and played a central role in the post-war development of Italian performing arts institutions.

Grassi later served as superintendent of La Scala and as president of RAI, where he oversaw major reforms in public broadcasting. He is regarded as a key figure in the modernization and democratization of Italian cultural life in the second half of the twentieth century.

== Biography ==
Grassi was born in Milan, Italy. As a young man, he worked in magazines and discovered a passion for the theatre. It led him in 1937 to create a Bertoldissimo (musical work), which he oversaw and directed. He organized the theatre company Ninchi-Dori-Tumiati and founded the avant-garde group Palcoscenico (Stage). Grassi was a Socialist. During the Second World War, he was conscripted into the army but went over to the Italian resistance movement, including working with the socialist newspaper Avanti!. During the 1940s, he was active in anti-fascist cultural circles, which influenced his later commitment to accessible, publicly funded theatre. In 1947, with Giorgio Strehler, friend and associate, Grassi founded the Piccolo Teatro di Milano, the first Italian civic theatre. It was later renamed, in his honour, the Teatro Paolo Grassi.

In 1964, he purchased the Teatro San Ferdinando with Strehler, renaming it Teatrale Napoletana. From 1972 to 1977 he was superintendent of the La Scala theatre, while from 1977 to 1980 held the post of president of Italy's state broadcaster RAI. He later became director of the Electa publishing house.

Grassi died in London in 1981 following heart surgery and is buried at the Monumental Cemetery of Milan. The Scuola d'arte drammatica Paolo Grassi ("School of Dramatic Arts Paolo Grassi") in Milan is named in his honour.

== Bibliography ==
- Paolo Grassi. Lettere 1942–1980, a cura di Guido Vergani, Skira, Milano (2004)
- Quarant’anni di palcoscenico, a cura di Emilio Pozzi, Mursia, Milano 1977
