= Big Deal on Madonna Street =

1958 Italian comedy caper film

- Italian film poster
- Italian: I soliti ignoti
- Directed by: Mario Monicelli
- Written by: Age & Scarpelli; Suso Cecchi d'Amico; Mario Monicelli
- Produced by: Franco Cristaldi
- Starring: Vittorio Gassman; Renato Salvatori; Memmo Carotenuto; Rossana Rory; Carla Gravina; Claudia Cardinale; Marcello Mastroianni; Totò
- Cinematography: Gianni di Venanzo a.i.c.
- Edited by: Adriana Novelli
- Music by: Piero Umiliani
- Distributed by: Lux Film
- Release date: 30 June 1958
- Running time: 107 minutes
- Country: Italy
- Language: Italian

Big Deal on Madonna Street (Italian: I soliti ignoti, lit. 'The Usual Unknown People'; released as Persons Unknown in the UK) is a 1958 Italian comedy caper film directed by Mario Monicelli. Regarded as one of the masterpieces of Italian cinema, the film received an Academy Award nomination for Best Foreign Language Film.

The plot revolves around the comedic mishaps of a group of small-time thieves attempting to burgle a pawn shop in Rome. The main characters are portrayed by Vittorio Gassman, Renato Salvatori, Carlo Pisacane, Tiberio Murgia, and Marcello Mastroianni. The film contributed significantly to the careers of Gassman and Mastroianni, with the former breaking into comedic roles previously considered unsuitable for him. Claudia Cardinale makes a minor appearance as a chaste Sicilian girl constrained by her overprotective brother, portrayed by Murgia. Cardinale achieved fame for her subsequent work.

The film's breezy jazz score by composer Piero Umiliani contributed to the development of the jazz soundtracks characteristic of European films in the 1960s and 1970s.

Initially doubtful about the film's potential success, the producers strategically featured the comedian Totò on the original poster to generate audience attention. Totò's character serves as a consultant to the heist gang instead of directly joining them.

In 2008, Big Deal on Madonna Street was included in the Italian Ministry of Cultural Heritage's list of 100 Italian films to be saved, acknowledging its impact on the collective memory of the country between 1942 and 1978.

== Title ==
The film's original Italian title literally translates as "the usual unknown ones," which is roughly equivalent to the English phrase "the usual suspects." The name of the Roman street in the English title is a slight mistranslation, as the Italian name of the fictional Roman street where the burglary takes place is the Via delle Madonne ("The Street of the Madonnas") rather than "Madonna Street." Compounding the confusion is the fact that the real Roman street on which the scene was filmed is the Via delle tre cannelle ("The Street of the Three Spouts"), rather than the Via delle tre Madonne ("The Street of the Three Madonnas").

== Plot ==
A hapless small-time Roman crook, Cosimo, is arrested for a bungled car theft and sentenced to a few months in prison. He harangues his girlfriend and lawyer to get him released so he can carry out a heist idea stolen from another inmate, a dishonest bricklayer who purposely constructed a flimsy wall between a pawn shop safe and an adjacent vacant apartment. Ultimately, Cosimo's gang bribes Peppe, a boxer with a clean criminal record, to confess, but the warden does not believe Peppe, and he ends up in jail alongside Cosimo. Peppe tells Cosimo that he has been sentenced to three long years for Cosimo's offense. To justify his actions, Cosimo, explains the details of the pawn shop heist to Peppe. Peppe then gleefully reveals that he was only given a year's probation and walks out of the prison gate, infuriating Cosimo.

Peppe takes up the heist plan with Cosimo's gang: Mario, a petty thief and the youngest member of the group; Michele, a posturing Sicilian crook who needs money for his sheltered sister's dowry; Tiberio, a down and out photographer caring for his baby while his wife is in jail on a minor offense; and Capannelle, an elderly pickpocket. Tiberio steals a movie camera from a flea market and attempts to film the combination to the pawn shop safe with a telephoto lens, but without success. Since none involved have the skill to crack the safe, they enlist the help of genteel local safe cracker Dante, who is careful not to violate his parole but supplies tools and gives them a brief primer.

The gang soon discovers the vacant apartment is occupied by two spinsters and their young maid, Nicoletta. Ladies' man Peppe learns from Nicoletta that the two older women leave the apartment overnight once a week. Peppe earns the offer of a tryst with the maid the next time the ladies leave. The rest of the group pressures him to accept so they can stage the burglary, but Nicoletta unexpectedly quits her job in a huff, and does not know if the spinsters will make their weekly departure. Meanwhile, Cosimo is released from prison. As the plan's mastermind, he had demanded a substantial portion of the loot but was rebuffed. He vows vengeance on the group by preemptively robbing the pawn shop at gunpoint, but the blasé pawnbroker assumes Cosimo wants to hock his gun. Deflated, Cosimo leaves, but during a botched purse snatching he is hit and killed by a streetcar.

Mario has fallen for Michele's sister, Carmelina, and quits the caper for fear of being caught and embarrassing his mother. He vows to pursue a straight life and court Carmelina. To participate in the robbery, Tiberio deposits his baby with his wife, who is in prison. He runs into the flea market proprietor, who breaks his arm for stealing the movie camera. The group's fortunes brighten, however, when the apartment's elderly occupants take their weekly trip after all. Re-energized, the gang breaks into the apartment and, after some setbacks, succeed in breaking through the wall they think leads to the pawnshop. But the wall leads into the apartment's kitchen; the elderly women had rearranged the furniture, thus disorienting the gang.

Realizing they have little time left until morning, they resignedly gather round the apartment's kitchen table and raid the refrigerator. Their repast ends abruptly when ever-starved Capannelle blows up the stove while lighting one of its burners. Thwarted, they all straggle homeward, peeling off one by one for streetcars until only Peppe and Capanelle are left. Peppe then surprises Capannelle by deciding to find legitimate work. A newspaper article later recounts a robbery by unknown persons who apparently broke into an apartment just to steal pasta with chickpeas.

== Cast ==
(character names are not indicated in on-screen cast credits)

Actor	Role
Vittorio Gassman	Peppe il pantera
Renato Salvatori	Mario Angeletti
Memmo Carotenuto	Cosimo
Rossana Rory	Norma
Carla Gravina	Nicoletta
Claudia Cardinale	Carmelina

Carlo Pisacane	Capannelle
Tiberio Murgia	Michele (known as "Ferribotte")
Gina Rovere	Teresa, Tiberio's wife
Gina Amendola	Mario's "Madre"
Elvira Tonelli	Assunta
Elena Fabrizi	Signora Ada

Pasquale Misiano	Massimo
Renato Terra	Eladio
Aldo Trifiletti	Fernando, the night porter
Nino Marchetti	Luigi
Mario De Simone	Receiver of stolen goods
Marcello Mastroianni	Tiberio
Totò	Dante Cruciani

== Production ==
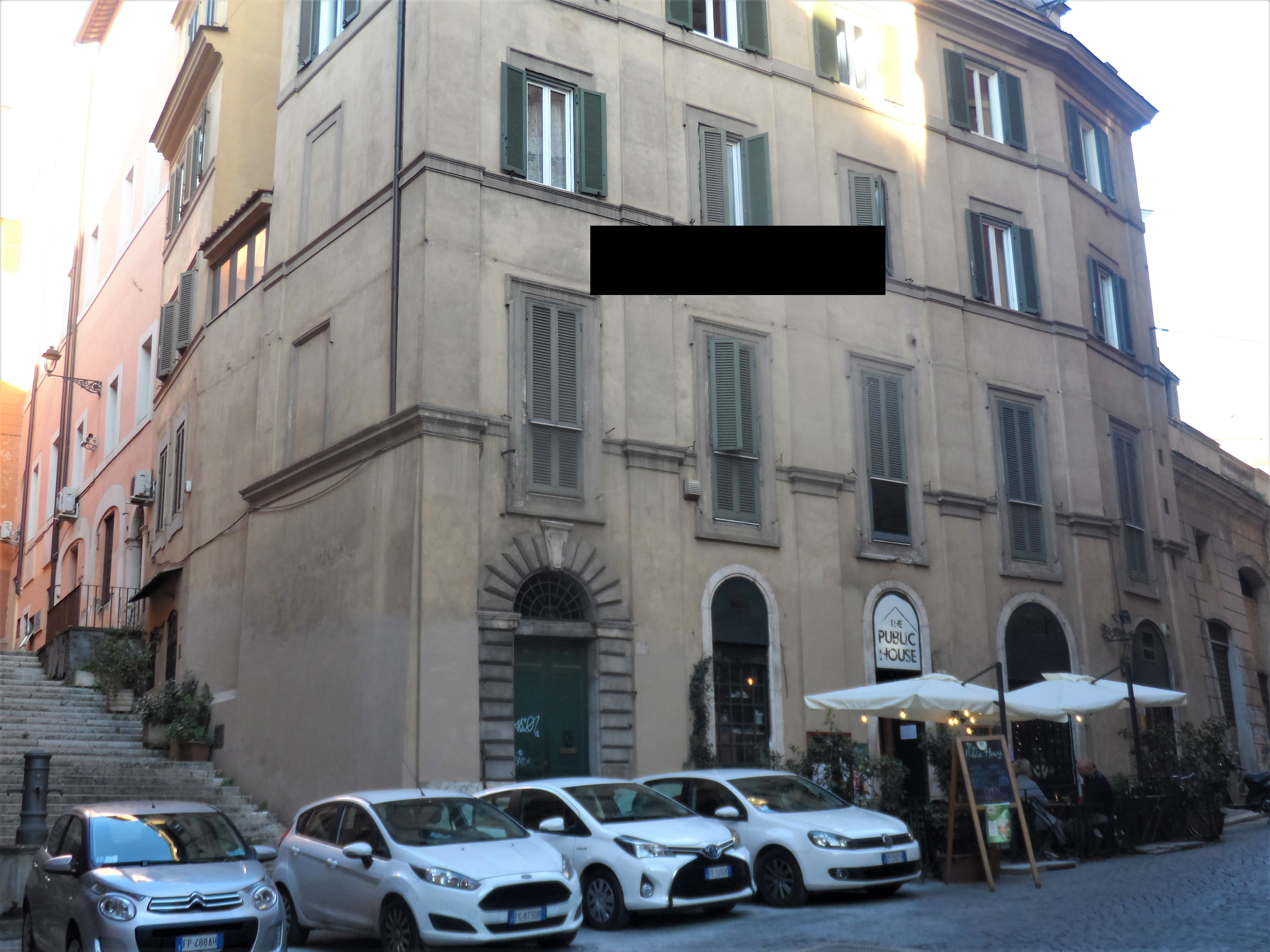
The building depicted in the film, photographed in 2019

According to director Mario Monicelli, while the film was intended as a parody of neorealism, "by then neorealism was already a thing of the past, something that was surpassed. It was more a parody that was aligned with a certain realism around us, with the poverty, and with people who had to do the best they could with whatever means possible to survive, with petty crimes."

Asked if it was also a parody of Jules Dassin's film Rififi, Monicelli said: "Yes because we saw this as a film shot in a very harsh, realist style. Very scientific, as the Peppe character continually says. So we wanted to do the same thing, but the characters didn't have the means. The way they worked was quite the contrary actually."

Monicelli and cinematographer Gianni Di Venanzo agreed on a photographic tone that was not comedic or brightly lit. "On the contrary," Monicelli said, "harsh and dramatic, because the film has a dramatic side in that it is about poor people. But Di Venanzo understood the tone. To make people laugh with a story that was dramatic rather than comic. But seen with a comic eye."

The film was shot in ten weeks on locations throughout Rome. Monicelli said: "The only interior that was shot in a studio was the wall that gets broken into at the end, because I couldn't break a wall in an actual apartment! But all the other interiors were shot on location. Which of course was a particular trait of Italian cinema, to shoot on location."

According to Monicelli, the film adhered to the script, without improvisations.

Dialogue, as was customary in Italian cinema, was all post-dubbed. Monicelli explained: "First of all because in Italy we often shoot with actors who are not professional." (Carlo Pisacane and Tiberio Murgia were not actors.) "So because they didn't know how to recite their lines they had to be dubbed." Furthermore, some cast members spoke in the wrong dialect. Monicelli continued, "So, for example, [Murgia] who plays the Sicilian was not Sicilian. So I had to have a Sicilian dub his voice. Another one of the actors who was supposed to be Bolognesian (from Bologna) was from Naples, so I had to dub his voice. Cardinale spoke French so I had to dub her voice into Sicilian."

The apartment and pawnshop on "Via della Madonna" was in reality located at 7–8, Via delle Tre Cannelle (41.896613°N 12.486°E), immediately north of Trajan's Market. The building is still standing as of 2019.

== Reception ==
=== Critical response ===
According to the review aggregator website Rotten Tomatoes, 89% of critics have given the film a positive review based on nine reviews, with an average rating of 7.5/10.

According to The New York Times, for its American release the film was "dubbed into English over a six-month period with considerable money and effort expended in matching voices and intonations to achieve artistic and mechanical perfection." At the time, there was a general debate over dubbing versus subtitling foreign films, and the American distributor, Richard Davis, screened the first reel of both versions for critics and writers and asked for their preference. They chose subtitles, though the dubbed version did make it to American TV in the early 1960s.

Several critics decried the subtitles. New York Times critic Bosley Crowther called it "an essentially funny picture, artfully and joyously played. It's just too bad those incongruous, flat subtitles have to get in the way." Chicago Tribune critic James Rich liked the film, though he noted "the humor [is] tarnished only when the parade of subtitles makes viewing a sort of exercise in speed reading." Philip K. Scheuer, writing for the Los Angeles Times, called it "cleverly directed and acted...but there is one disadvantage for the linguistically limited: they have to wait to read the joke at the bottom of the screen, and by the time they can appreciate its purport the actors have already gone on to the next one."

Other critics simply praised the film. The critic for the New York Herald-Tribune called it "one of the most irresistible Italian comedies in years. No one with a sense of humor and an appreciation of humanity should miss it." The Washington Post wrote: "Most unusual, however, and ever so clever, are the ways the script progresses to its climactic goof-up." The Baltimore Sun said: "Director Mario Monicelli has endowed the film with such flashes of brilliance, and the cast...has enacted it with such tasteful understatement, that The Big Deal on Madonna Street must be listed as one of the funniest comedies of the last ten years."

Crowther, in a follow-up essay, wrote: "Although the routines have whiskers, so old and used in vaudeville are they, the picture has an ageless zest for laughter."

=== Awards and nominations ===
The film was a hit in Italy when it was released and won two Italian Nastro d'Argento awards: Best Leading Actor (Gassman) and Best Screenplay. It also garnered the prestigious Silver Shell for Best Director at the San Sebastián Film Festival in Spain. The film won Best Comedy at the 12th annual Locarno Film Festival in Switzerland. The film was also Italy's Oscar nominee for Best Foreign Language Film at the 31st Academy Awards. It lost to Jacques Tati's Mon Oncle.

== Sequels ==
A sequel directed by Nanni Loy titled Audace colpo dei soliti ignoti (also known as Fiasco in Milan or Hold-up à la Milanaise) followed in 1959, reuniting the entire main cast, aside from Totò and Mastroianni.

Another sequel was released in 1985, directed by Amanzio Todini and titled I Soliti ignoti vent'anni dopo (known in English-speaking countries as Big Deal After 20 Years; it was released by Koch Lorber on DVD in the United States as Big Deal on Madonna Street - 20 Years Later).

== Remakes ==
Two remakes of the film were shot in the United States: the 1984 film Crackers by Louis Malle (set in San Francisco) and the 2002 film Welcome to Collinwood by Anthony Russo and Joe Russo (set in Cleveland).

Bob Fosse created a Broadway musical titled Big Deal based on the film. Set in 1930s Chicago with an African-American cast and using popular songs of the era, the show opened at the Broadway Theatre on April 10, 1986, and closed on June 8, 1986, after 69 performances. It received five Tony Award nominations, with Fosse winning for his choreography.

== Home video ==
The film is distributed in Region 1 by The Criterion Collection and for the Italian market in Region 2 by 20th Century Fox.

== See also ==
- List of submissions to the 31st Academy Awards for Best Foreign Language Film
- List of Italian submissions for the Academy Award for Best Foreign Language Film
