= Audace colpo dei soliti ignoti =

1959 film

- Original film poster
- Directed by: Nanni Loy
- Written by: Agenore Incrocci; Furio Scarpelli; Nanni Loy (dialogue)
- Produced by: Franco Cristaldi
- Starring: Vittorio Gassman, Renato Salvatori and Claudia Cardinale.
- Cinematography: Roberto Gerardi
- Edited by: Mario Serandrei
- Music by: Piero Umiliani
- Distributed by: Titanus
- Release date: December 1959 (Italy)
- Running time: 105 minutes
- Countries: Italy; France
- Language: Italian

Audace colpo dei soliti ignoti (also known as Fiasco in Milan or Hold-up à la milanaise) is a 1959 Italian comedy crime film directed by Nanni Loy. The film stars Vittorio Gassman, Renato Salvatori and Claudia Cardinale.

It is the sequel to Mario Monicelli's I soliti ignoti (1958) and is followed by Big Deal After 20 Years (1985).

== Plot ==
A Milanese gangster contacts Peppe (Gassman); he has identified him and his accomplices as the perpetrators of the bungled attempt at robbing the Madonna Street pawn shop.

His offer is to reunite the same men for a daring robbery in Milan, where the local offices of football betting pool Totocalcio shift the weekly revenue on Sunday afternoon via a common car with just an accountant and a driver in it. The gang would have to travel north from Rome disguised among the supporters of A. S. Roma going to Milan for a football match, commit the robbery and then flee to Bologna via a souped-up car there to rejoin the returning sport fans.

The Milanese seems tough and smart and his proposal sounds very inviting for the small-time crooks who all have their problems trying to lead an "honest" life, but things will go differently.

== Cast ==
Actor	Role
Vittorio Gassman	Peppe er pantera
Renato Salvatori	Mario Angeletti
Claudia Cardinale	Carmela Nicosia
Nino Manfredi	Ugo Nardi, named "Piede Amaro"
Vicky Ludovisi	Floriana
Riccardo Garrone	Il milanese
Tiberio Murgia	Ferribotte
Carlo Pisacane	Capannelle
Gianni Bonagura	Totocalcio accountant
Gina Amendola (as Luigina Amendola)	Imma
Clara Bindi (as Clara Bini)	Luisella
Elena Fabrizi (as Lella Fabrizi)	Lella
Mauro Lemma	Gianni
Gastone Moschin	Bookseller
Elvira Tonelli	
Toni Ucci	Totocalcio driver

== Release ==
Audace colpo dei soliti ignoti opened in Rome in December 1959. It was shown in Paris in August 1962 with the title Hold-up la milanaise.
