= Tiberio Murgia =

Italian actor (1929–2010)

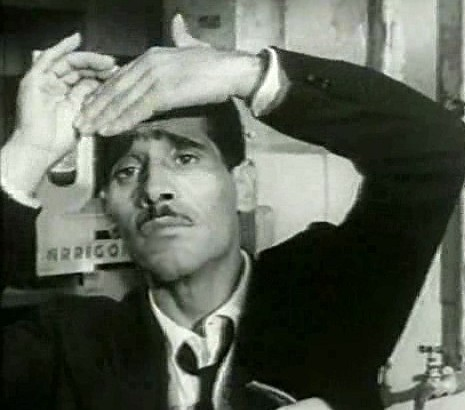
- Murgia in Audace colpo dei soliti ignoti (1959)
- Born: 5 February 1929; Oristano, Italy
- Died: 20 August 2010 (aged 81); Tolfa, Italy
- Occupation: Actor
- Years active: 1958–2009

Tiberio Murgia (5 February 1929 – 20 August 2010) was an Italian film actor. He appeared in more than 100 films between 1958 and 2009.

== Biography ==
Born into a humble family, Murgia began working as a laborer from an early age. At the age of twenty he was already a peddler for l'Unità, the newspaper of the Italian Communist Party. The managing directors of the local branch of the party recognized particular political skills in him and send him to the National School for the party leaders in Frattocchie in the province of Rome.

After his return, six months later, he became the Secretary of the Young Communist League and married. After some time, however, Murgia began to entertain a relationship with a fellow party member, who was also married. Murgia was then expelled because of this clandestine affair.

Murgia then emigrated to Marcinelle, in Belgium, to work at the Bois du Cazier coalmine which had several thousands of Italian workers as miners, pursuant to the Italian Belgian Protocol of 20 June 1946. There also Murgia established a relationship with the wife of a Belgian coworker and escaped death that fatal night of the Marcinelle mining disaster, in which a gas explosion killed all the miners on his shift, including the woman's husband. Murgia later claimed, although some doubt his story, that he had been feigning illness in order to obtain sick leave so that he could spend the night with the woman.

Murgia returned to his hometown, Oristano, but was forced to emigrate to Rome in order to escape the wrath of the family of another young woman which he wooed despite both of them being already married. In Rome he began working as a dishwasher in a restaurant in the city center (Il re degli amici, the king of friends) until he was noticed by an assistant of the director Mario Monicelli, who invited him to the studio for an audition, after which he was given the part of "Ferribote"—a corruption of the English term "ferry boat", referring to the ferry that connects Sicily to the mainland—an extremely jealous and possessive Sicilian immigrant. Since Murgia was Sardinian, not Sicilian, his lines were dubbed by another actor.

The movie was originally calledLe Madame—-slang for "policeman"—before censors required the film to be retitled I soliti ignoti, or The Usual Unknown, released in the US as Big Deal on Madonna Street. As a result, Murgia did not even know the film in which he starred was already in the theatres. He had found himself a job at a construction site at Ponte Milvio, when the production team miraculously tracked him down to give him a contract and an advance of ten million lire.

Following the success of Monicelli's film, Murgia later acted in around 100 films and television productions over the next 40 years. Murgia continued to portray the caricatured stereotype of a Sicilian, his eyes often half closed and his eyebrows perennially arched and bushy, his head slightly turned backwards in the satirical representation of a wary and stubborn Sicilian; others dubbed his lines to provide them with Sicilian cadence. His films run the gamut from Commedia all'italiana to genre films, especially Italian sex comedy and musicarelli.

At the end of 2004 the actor published his autobiography I solito ignoto, (The Usual Unknown), written with the collaboration of the journalist Sergio Sciarra. The release of the book returned him to the limelight.

Suffering from Alzheimer's for some time, Murgia died in a nursing home in Tolfa on 20 August 2010, the last survivor of the male protagonists of I soliti ignoti. In 2012 the documentary L'insolito ignoto-Vita acrobatica (The Unusual Unknown-An Acrobatic Life) was made, which traces the life of the actor and includes an unpublished interview.

== Selected filmography ==
- Big Deal on Madonna Street (1958)
- Il raccomandato di ferro (1959)
- Audace colpo dei soliti ignoti (1960)
- Fountain of Trevi (1960)
- The Two Rivals (1960)
- L'onorata società (1961)
- Damon and Pythias (1962)
- I Don Giovanni della Costa Azzurra (1962)
- Three Nights of Love (1964)
- The Saint Lies in Wait (1966)
- The Girl with the Pistol (1968)
- L'homme orchestre (1970)
- Paulo Roberto Cotechiño centravanti di sfondamento (1983)
- Big Deal After 20 Years (1987)
- Breath of Life (1990)
