= Gemma Harasim =

Italian writer (1876–1961)

Gemma Harasim (1876 in Fiume – 1961 in Rome) was a known pedagogical writer from Fiume.

From 1907 to 1909, she got a scholarship from the municipality of Fiume to study at the University of Florence. There she got in contact with the intellectual circle centered on "La Voce". She wrote four letters on the situation in Fiume that were published as Lettere da Fiume.

She married Giuseppe Lombardo Radice, one of the first Italian pedagogues. Their daughter Laura Lombardo Radice married the Italian communist Pietro Ingrao. Their son was the mathematician Lucio Lombardo Radice.
