= Maria Boschetti-Alberti =

Swiss educator and pedagog (1879–1951)

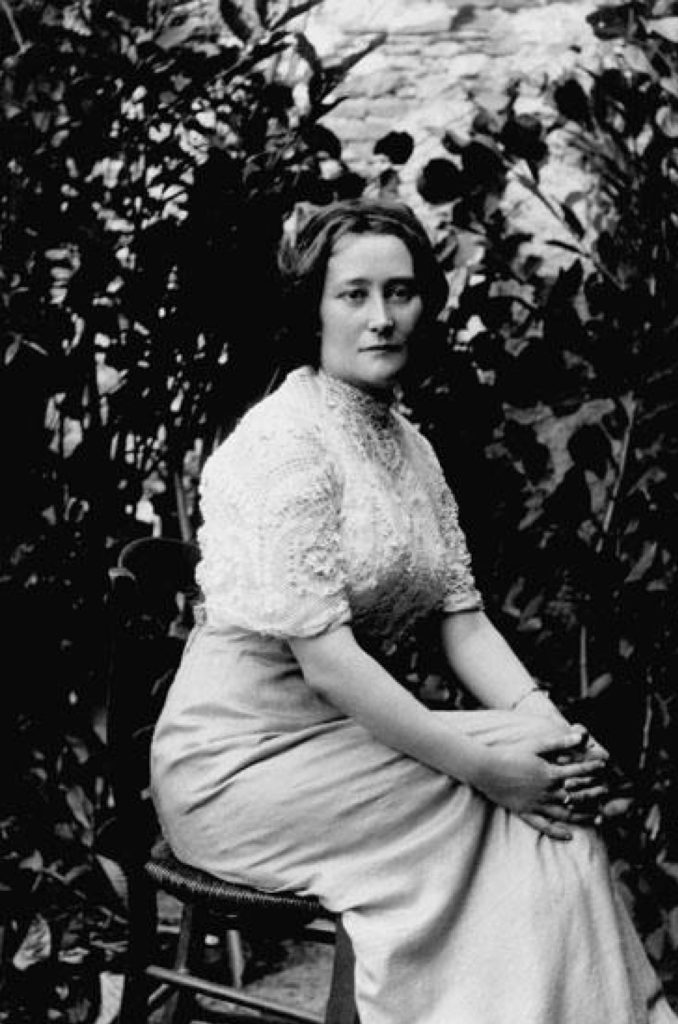
Image of Maria Alberti Boschetti

Maria Boschetti-Alberti (23 December 1879 – 20 January 1951) was a Swiss educator and pedagog best remembered for reforming education in the Swiss canton of Ticino. Her pedagogical philosophy was considered influential to education in Switzerland, only behind that of Maria Montessori.
