= Lucio Lombardo-Radice =

Italian mathematician (1916–1982)

Lucio Lombardo-Radice (Catania, 10 July 1916 – Brussels, 21 November 1982) was an Italian mathematician. A student of Gaetano Scorza, Lombardo-Radice contributed to finite geometry and geometric combinatorics together with Guido Zappa and Beniamino Segre, and wrote important works concerning the Non-Desarguesian plane. He was also a leading member of the Italian Communist Party and a member of its central committee. He had a long professional and political friendship with German natural scientist and dissident Robert Havemann.

Lombardo-Radice's parents were Giuseppe Lombardo Radice and Gemma Harasim. His children included the writer Marco Lombardo Radice and actor Giovanni Lombardo Radice.

The Istituto Tecnico Statale Commerciale "Lucio Lombardo Radice" per Programmatori, a school in Rome, Italy, founded in 1982 as the XXV Istituto Tecnico Commerciale per Programmatori, was in 1992 renamed after Lombardo-Radice. It is now named Istituto di Istruzione Superiore Lombardo Radice
