= Piccolo Teatro (Milan) =

Theatre company in Milan, Italy

Coordinates: 45°27′59″N 9°11′5″E

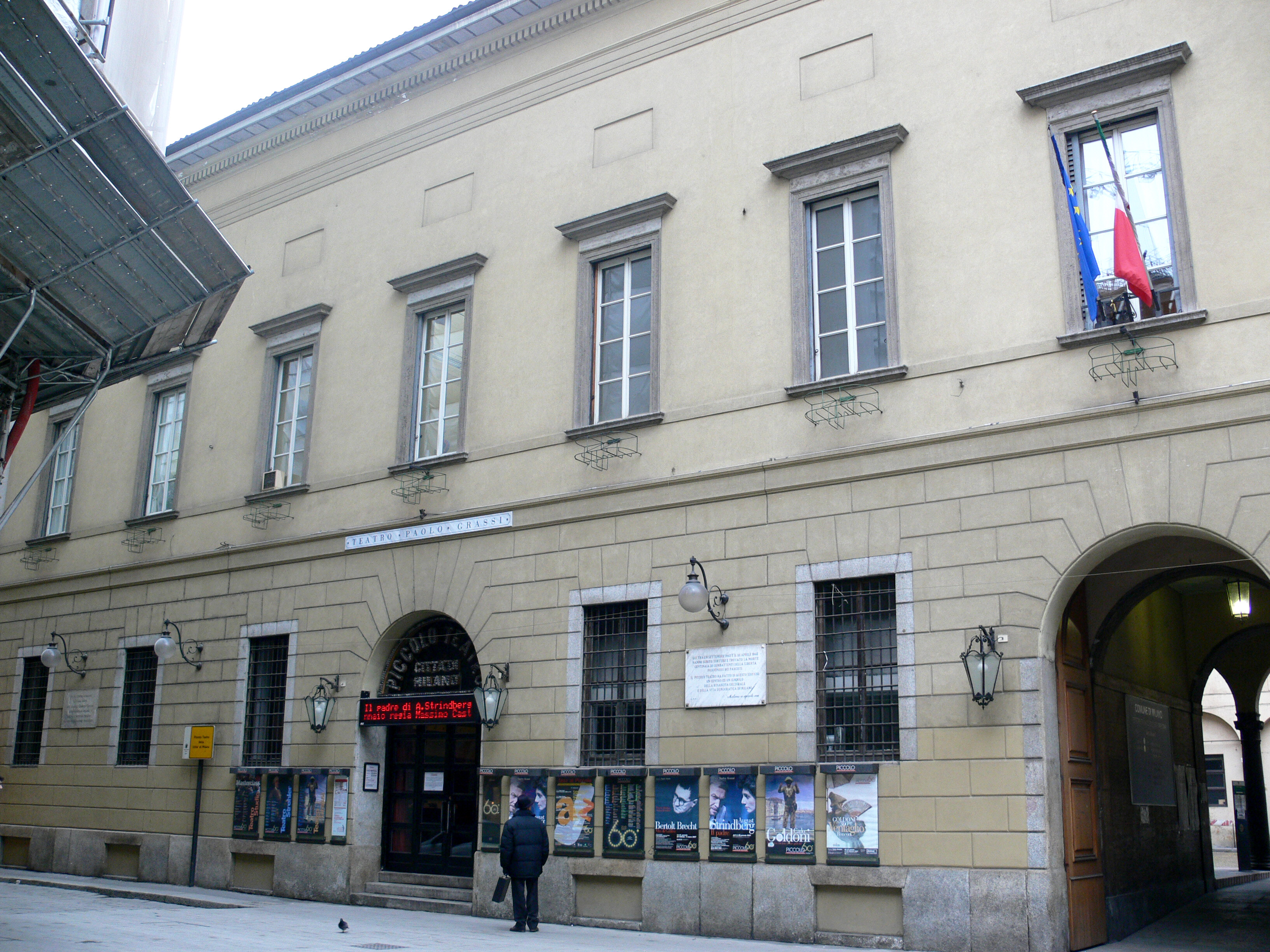
Piccolo Teatro Grassi

The Piccolo Teatro di Milano ('Little Theatre of the City of Milan') is a theatre in Milan, Italy. Founded in 1947, it is Italy's first permanent theatre, and a national teatro stabile, or permanent repertory company, and is considered a theatre of major national and European importance. The theatre has three venues: Teatro Grassi, in Via Rovello, between Sforza Castle and the Piazza del Duomo; Teatro Studio, which was originally intended to be the theater's rehearsal hall; and Teatro Strehler, which opened in 1998 with a seating capacity of 974. Its annual programme consists of approximately thirty performances. In addition, the venue hosts cultural events, from festivals and films, to concerts, conferences, and conventions, as well as supporting the Paolo Grassi Drama School.

== History ==
Piccolo Teatro was founded by theatre impresario Paolo Grassi and actor and director Giorgio Strehler, along with Mario Apollonio, Virgilio Tosi and Nina Vinchi. According to Grassi, the founders were theatrical and political idealists that sought to "put forward theoretical principles and practical standards of conduct radically different from those which up until then had governed activity in Italy". The Milan city council approved the transformation of Cinema Broletto into Piccolo Teatro, to be managed directly by the City of Milan on 26 January 1947. The first performance, described as minimalist, took place four months later, on May 14, 1947, with L'albergo dei poveri ('Lower Depths') by Maxim Gorky. Offering affordable tickets and productions fraught with risk, Piccolo Teatro became renewed for "revitalizing popular interest in the classics of the Italian stage". Its company became well known for its productions of Carlo Goldoni and Luigi Pirandello in particular, and of Bertolt Brecht, Eugene O'Neill, T. S. Eliot, Henrik Ibsen, Molière, Georg Büchner and Peter Weiss.

In the 1960s, the Piccolo Teatro was relocated to Teatro Lirico (Milan). In 1967, on the occasion of its 20th anniversary, the theatre put on a production of Goldoni's Il servitore di due padroni.

The theatre's archives are currently maintained by the Archivio Multimediale del Piccolo Teatro di Milano (AMPT). On the occasion of the theatre's 60th anniversary in 2007, the President of Italy Giorgio Napolitano granted the "Ente Autonomo Piccolo Teatro di Milano-Teatro d'Europa" patronage for the entire duration of his seven-year presidential term. As of 2012, it is under the direction of Sergio Escobar, along with artistic director Luca Ronconi.

== Seasons ==
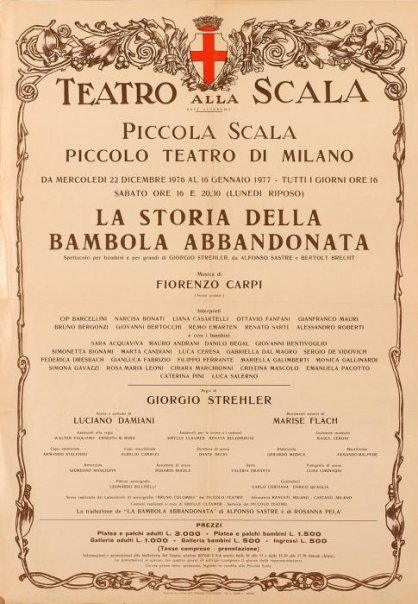
Strehler-Carpi program, 1976-1977

In its first decade, performances included:

- 1947: The Lower Depths (Gorky), The Nights of Rage (Salacrou), The prodigious Magician (Calderon), Arlecchino, the Servant of Two Masters (Goldoni), The Mountain Giants (Pirandello), The Storm (Ostrovsky)
- 1948: Crime and Punishment (Dostoyevsky), Richard II (Shakespeare), The Seagull (Chekov), The Skin of Our Teeth (Wilder)
- 1949: The Taming of the Shrew (Shakespeare), People in Their Time (Bontempelli), Little Eyolf (Ibsen)
- 1950: The Women of Paris (Becque), Richard II (Shakespeare), The Just (Camus), Alcestis (Savinio), Summer and Smoke (Williams)
- 1951: A Doll's House (Ibsen), Fool's Gold (Giovaninetti), Never Swear by Anything (De Musset), Disaster at the North Depot (Betti), The Army Lover (Molière), The Flying Doctor (Goldoni), Hoppla, Such is Life (Toller)
- 1952: Macbeth (Shakespeare), Emma (Zardi), Walking on Water (Vergani), Elizabeth of England (Bruckner), The Government Inspector (Gogol)
- 1953: The Mechanism (Sartre), The Worst Sacrilege (Pirandello), Lulu (Bertolazzi), A Clinical Case (Buzzati), Julius Caesar (Shakespeare), Six Days (D'Errico)
- 1954: The Crow (Gozzi), Triple Bill (Pirandello), The Mad Woman of Chaillot (Giraudoux), The Masquerade (Moravia), The Ideal Wife (Praga), The Villeggiatura Trilogy (Goldoni)
- 1955: The Cherry Orchard (Chekhov),The House of Bernarda Alba (Lorca),The Measures Taken (Brecht), Three Quarters of the Moon (Squarzina), Our Milan (Bertolazzi)
- 1956: The Threepenny Opera (Brecht), From Yours to Mine (Verga), The Jacobins (Zardi), Coriolanus (Shakespeare)

== Sources ==
- Giorgio Guazzotti, Teoria e realtà del Piccolo Teatro di Milano ('Myth and Reality of the Piccolo Teatro of Milan'), Einaudi, Turin, 1965. (A revised and expanded edition was published in 1986).
- F. Grassi, A Magli, Milano e Paolo Grassi: un teatro per la città, Bagno a Ripoli, Passigli, 2011, ISBN 88-7813-608-5
- S. Locatelli, P. Provenzano (a cura di), Mario Apollonio e il Piccolo teatro di Milano. Testi e documenti, Roma, Edizioni di Storia e Letteratura, 2017, ISBN 978-88-6372-972-6
- M. Poli, Milano in Piccolo: il Piccolo Teatro nelle pagine del Corriere della Sera, Milano, Fondazione Corriere della Sera, 2007, ISBN 978-88-17-01752-7
