= Giorgio Strehler =

Italian opera and theatre director (1921–1997)

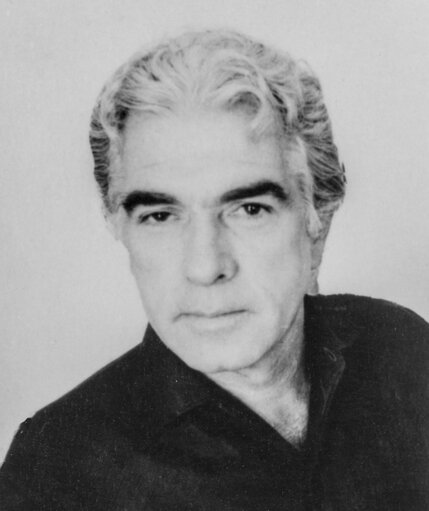
- Strehler in 1983

Member of the Senate of the Republic
- In office 2 July 1987 – 22 April 1992
- Constituency: Lombardy

Member of the European Parliament
- In office 26 September 1983 – 23 July 1984
- Constituency: North-West Italy

Personal details
- Born: 14 August 1921 Trieste, Kingdom of Italy
- Died: 25 December 1997 (aged 76) Lugano, Switzerland
- Party: PSI (1979–1984); Independent Left (1987–1992)
- Education: Accademia dei Filodrammatici; University of Pavia
- Occupation: Theatre director; actor

Giorgio Strehler (Italian pronunciation: [ˈdʒordʒo ˈstrɛːler]; German: [ˈʃtʁeːlɐ]; 14 August 1921 – 25 December 1997) was an Italian stage director, theatre practitioner, actor, and politician. Strehler was one of the most significant figures in Italian theatre during his lifetime, described by Mel Gussow as "the grand master of Italian theater" and "one of the world's boldest and most innovative directors". He co-founded Italy's first and most significant repertory company, the Piccolo Teatro of Milan, and the Union of the Theatres of Europe. The Teatro Strehler theatre in Milan is named after him.

With the Italian Socialist Party, Strehler served as Member of the European Parliament between 1983 and 1984, representing North-West Italy. He switched parties to the Independent Left, for which he was a Senator from 1987 to 1992, representing Lombardy.

== Biography ==
Strehler was born in Barcola, Trieste. His father, Bruno Strehler, was a native of Trieste with family roots in Vienna and died when Giorgio was only three. His maternal grandfather, Olimpio Lovrich, subsequently became his father figure. Olimpio was one of the finest horn players of his day and the impresario of the Teatro Comunale Giuseppe Verdi, Trieste's Opera House. When he was seven, his grandfather died, and he moved to Milan with his mother and grandmother.

As a child, Strehler was not impressed by theatre. He found it "false" and decided it did not have the power to stir one's emotions as film did. His opinions changed one hot summer night while on his way to the cinema. He noticed a sign advertising the air-conditioning posted by the Odeon Theatre. He walked in for some relief from the weather to see a performance of Carlo Goldoni's Una delle ultime sere di Carnevale being given by a company from Venice. He went every evening for the next few days to see more plays by Goldoni. Newly inspired by the theatre, he applied and was accepted to the theatre school Accademia dei Filodrammatici.

During the war, Strehler went into exile in Switzerland. With Geneva's Compagnie des Masques, he directed the world premiere of Albert Camus's Caligula. After the war, he became a theatre critic for Milano Sera but he preferred making theatre rather than writing about it. It was at this time that he started the Piccolo Teatro di Milano with Paolo Grassi. It opened on 17 May 1947 in the auditorium of the Broletto Cinema with Maxim Gorky's The Lower Depths. A few days later, they staged Carlo Goldoni's long forgotten Arlecchino: Servant of Two Masters commedia dell'arte, which would go on to become the longest running play in Italian theatre. In that same year, he also directed Giuseppe Verdi's La traviata at La Scala, the first of many opera productions he would direct.

Strehler focused on culturally relevant theatre. He did not want to "pay an abstract homage to culture" or "to offer a mere distraction... passive contemplation". Instead, both Strehler and Grassi agreed that theatre was "a place where people gather to hear statements that they can accept or reject".

== Influences ==
In the 1950s, Strehler directed several plays by Bertolt Brecht with whom he would become close friends, sharing political beliefs. In 1956, Brecht attended a production of his The Threepenny Opera. Back in Berlin, he wrote, "thank you for the excellent performance of my Threepenny Opera which you have realized with a great director. Fire and freshness, ease and precision distinguish this performance from many others I have seen... it would be a joy and an honor for me if your theater could perform... at the Berliner Ensemble's Theater... which witnessed the first performance of this work."

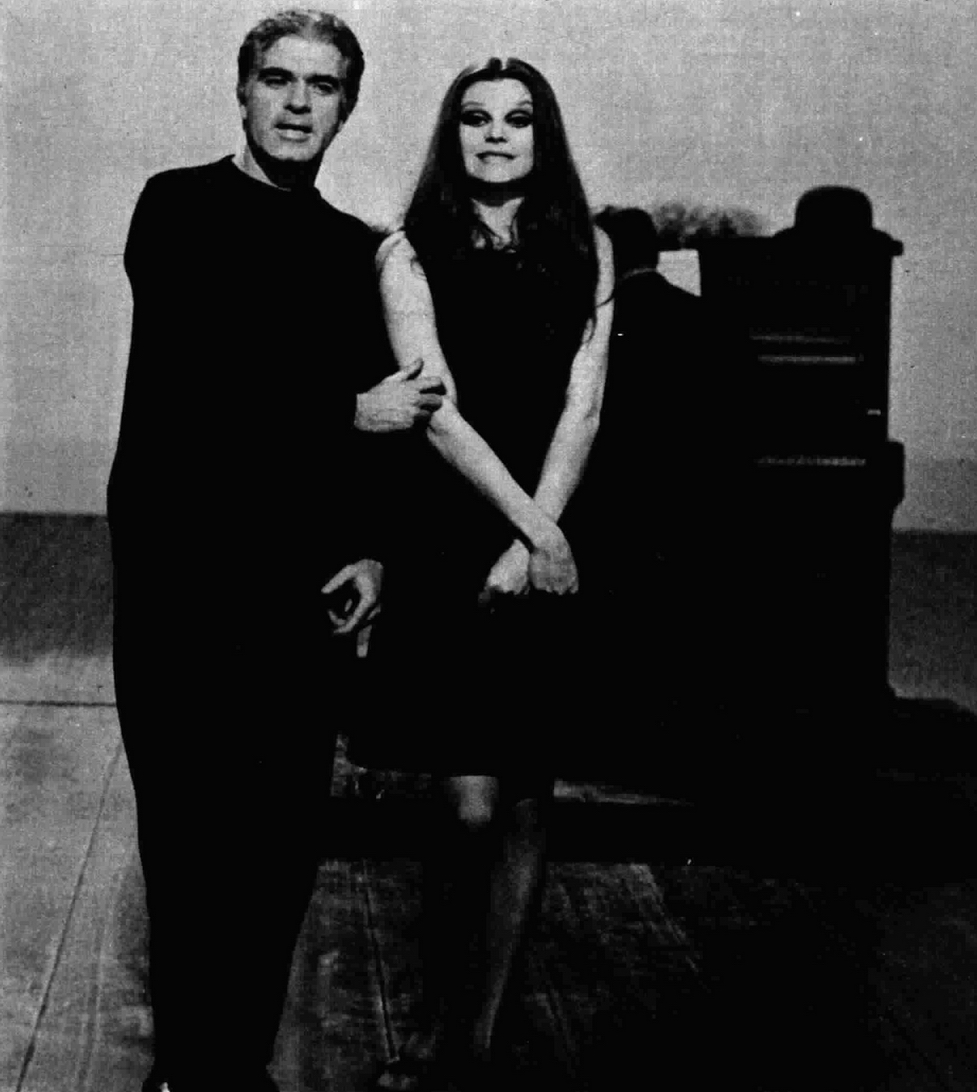
Strehler and Milva

His love for William Shakespeare (Coriolanus, The Tempest, King Lear, Twelfth Night, Macbeth), Luigi Pirandello (Enrico IV), and Anton Chekhov (The Cherry Orchard, Platonov) was unmistakable; he always returned to Goldoni repeating the same plays decades later. He created the role of theatre director (regista was actually coined in 1929) in Italy all by himself. Until he came, plays were for the most part still put on by travelling companies that were a microcosm unto themselves. They directed themselves. They had never heard of a director. He also gave prominence to Italian authors, though few in number. Strehler used to say that "Italian theatre has produced few important dramatic authors – Niccolò Machiavelli, Carlo Goldoni, Luigi Pirandello – but an enormous number of actors. Between 1500 and 1700, every self-respecting court in Europe had to have a company of Italian actors."

Soon after the arrival of Ornella Vanoni at the Piccolo Teatro in Milan in 1953, Strehler began cooperating with her. He suggested that she start singing "Canzoni della Mala" such as Ma Mi..., which established her career.

Strehler originally had not intended to become an actor. He had enrolled in the law school at the University of Milan, planning to become a criminal lawyer. He said, "a profession as I imagined it was very close to the theater". But then war came, and it changed everything. He influenced three generations of actors and inspired many around the world. His influence in the English-speaking world is less felt since he spoke little English and did not direct many plays in this language. However, he was given the Légion d'honneur by the French government and was named director of the "Union of the Theatres of Europe" in Paris in 1985, the first Pan-European theatre project. He was president of the jury at the Cannes Film Festival in 1982. In 1990 he was the recipient of the Europe Theatre Prize.

The visual impact of his productions always concerned Strehler. The stage designers Luciano Damiani and later Ezio Frigerio closely collaborated with Strehler for many years, both for theatrical and operatic productions. He died in Lugano, Switzerland. The funeral in Milan was attended with great participation of citizens and politicians, with Italian President Oscar Luigi Scalfaro eulogizing him as "a great artistic and humane personality who honoured the country". His ashes were deposited in the cemetery of Trieste.

== Opera productions ==
- Jeanne d'Arc au Bûcher (Arthur Honegger) La Scala, Milan (1946)
- Lulu (Alban Berg) Venice (1949)
- La favola del figlio cambiato (Gian Francesco Malipiero), Venice (1952)
- The Fiery Angel (Sergei Prokofiev) Venice (1955)
- L'histoire du soldat (Igor Stravinsky) Piccola Scala, Milan (1957)
- Un cappello di paglia di Firenze (Nino Rota) Piccola Scala, Milan (1958)
- Rise and Fall of the City of Mahagonny (Kurt Weill) Piccola Scala, Milan (1964)
- Die Entführung aus dem Serail (Mozart) Salzburg Festival (1965)
- Cavalleria rusticana (Pietro Mascagni) La Scala, Milan (1966)
- Fidelio (Beethoven) Florence (1969)
- Simon Boccanegra (Verdi) La Scala, Milan (1971), Vienna State Opera (1984)
- Le nozze di Figaro (Mozart) Paris (1973), Milan (1980)
- The Magic Flute (Mozart) Salzburg Festival (1974)
- Macbeth (Verdi) La Scala, Milan (1975)
- Falstaff (Verdi) La Scala, Milan (1980)
- Don Giovanni (Mozart) La Scala, Milan (1987)
- Così fan tutte (Mozart), Piccolo Teatro, Milan (1998) (note: Strehler died during the final rehearsals)

== Theatre productions ==
- Richard II, Shakespeare (1948)
- Julius Caesar, Shakespeare (1953)
- Coriolanus, Shakespeare (1957)
- Power Games (an adaptation of Shakespeare's first Henriad) (1965)
- Re Lear, Shakespeare (1972)L'Illusion Comique
- The Tempest (play) Shakespeare (1978)
- L'Illusion, Pierre Corneille (1984, Paris Odéon Théâtre de l'Europe)
- Harlequin in all its versions, the oldest and most famous Italian show (beginning from 1947)
- The Trilogy of Holiday (1954)
- Servant of Two Masters by Goldoni (1964)
- Il campiello (1975) by Goldoni
- Platonov by Chekhov (1959)
- The Cherry Orchard by Chekhov (1955, 1974)
- The Mountain Giants (1947, Piccolo Teatro, Milan; 1966, Teatro Lirico/Piccolo Teatro, Milan; 1994 both in Milan and in Vienna at the Burgtheater), Pirandello
- As You Desire Me (1988 to present) by Pirandello
- El nost Milan (1955 and 1979) and Egoist by Bertolazzi (1960)
- The House of Bernarda Alba by García Lorca (1955)
- The Storm, Strindberg, Piccolo Teatro, (1980)
- The Visit of the Old Lady by Dürrenmatt (1960)
- The Great Magic by Eduardo De Filippo for drammaturgia contemporary (1985)
- Three Penny Opera by Bertold Brecht (1956)
- The Good Person of Setzuan by Bertolt Brecht (1958, 1981 and 1996)
- Saint Joan of the Stockyards by Bertold Brecht (1970)
- Galileo Galilei by Bertolt Brecht (1963)
- Das Spiel der Mächtigen, Salzburg Festival, 1974; Burgtheater, Vienna, 1975
- Trilogie der Sommerfrische (Trilogia della villeggiatura), Carlo Goldoni, Vienna, Burgtheater, 1974

On 10 October 2005, a stretch of road in front of the Politeama Rossetti in Trieste was dedicated to Giorgio Strehler.

== Europe Theatre Prize ==
In 1990, Strehler was awarded the III Europe Theatre Prize, in Taormina, with the following motivation:

The work of Giorgio Strehler, to whom the 1990 Europe Theatre Prize has been unanimously awarded by the Jury, is a cornerstone in the construction of post-war European Theatre. He has worked not only as a director, but also as manager, guiding light, actor, writer, translator, teacher, and advocate of an all-embracing "theatrical idea" rooted in the fabric of society and politics, which has had an impact throughout European theatrical culture. Various aspects of his personality converge in his constant and single-minded attempt to build the necessary structures for a European theatre intended as a common workshop of new ventures and experiences. Starting in the Piccolo Teatro di Milano, this determination eventually flowered into the foundation of the first really European theatrical organism, the Théâtre de l’Europe, which Strehler was called to direct. Today Strehler's activities have expanded to even greater dimensions in the context of the transformation which our continent has undergone, and which theatre has done so much to promote.

== Honours ==
- Honorary degree, University of Pavia, 1992.

== Bibliography ==
- Martinez, Alessandro (2007). Giorgio Strehler ou la passion théâtrale [Giorgio Strehler or a passion for theatre]. S. Gregorio di Catania: Premio Europa per il Teatro. ISBN 978-88-901014-9-6. OCLC 800923709.
