= Marco I. Benevento =

Italian musician

- Born: December 19, 1978 (age 47); Campobasso, Italy
- Genres: Alternative rock, Neofolk, Gothic metal, Doom metal, Classical, Electronic
- Occupations: Musician, Sound Designer
- Instruments: Piano, guitar
- Years active: 1994–present
- Labels: Cyclone Empire/Metal Blade, Martyr Music Group, Emergency Music, Candlelight Records, Sam

Marco I. Benevento (born December 19, 1978), is an Italian musician, singer and songwriter. He began his career in the mid-1990s as a singer and musician for rock and heavy metal bands and as a composer of movie soundtracks.

== Biography ==
Trained as a pianist, Benevento began playing the keyboards in a rock band at age 16. In 1998 (using the stage name of "Dust") he founded the doom metal band How Like A Winter (formerly Grand Guignol). They recorded a never-released demo in 1999. In 2001 Benevento and How Like A Winter recorded the Demo-CD The winter's near and signed with American record label Martyr Music Group with whom he released the album "...Beyond My Grey Wake".

In 2006 Benevento joined the band The Foreshadowing and with them he released 3 albums and toured Europe and the United States.

In 2012 his soundtrack debut with the musical score for Marco Risi's feature film "Cha cha cha".

Marco I. Benevento lives in Rome where he continues to work as a musician and also as a sound designer and actor.

== Discography ==
With How Like A Winter:

- The winter's near – (2001)
- ...Beyond My Grey Wake – (2003)

With Kamlath:

- Stronger than frost (2011)

With The Foreshadowing:

- Days of Nothing – (2007)
- Oionos – (2010)
- Second World – (2012)
- Seven Heads Ten Horns – (2016)

With The I:

- Backwards (single) - (2015)
