= Emanuele Propizio =

Italian actor

Vittorio Emanuele Propizio
- Born: 30 December 1991 (age 34); Rome, Italy
- Years active: 2007–present
- Height: 1.73 m (5 ft 8 in)

Vittorio Emanuele Propizio (born 30 December 1991) is an Italian actor in cinema and television.

== Career ==
Propizio was born in Rome to Sicilian parents. Among his films are: My Brother is an Only Child (2007), where he played a young Accio; Grande, grosso e... Verdone, where he played the child of Carlo Verdone; Natale a Rio, starring Christian De Sica, Massimo Ghini and Ludovico Fremont. Also in 2009, he acted in the film Natale a Beverly Hills, directed by Neri Parenti, and in 2010 he played one of the protagonists of Parents and Children: Shake Well Before Using, a film by Giovanni Veronesi, and also with Veronesi he performed in The Ages of Love, where he played Cupid. In 2015 he was in the cast of Aneddoti Kids.

== Filmography ==
=== Film ===
Year	Title	Role	Notes
2007	My Brother Is an Only Child	Teenage Accio	
2008	Grande, grosso e... Verdone	Steven Vecchiarutti	
2008	Natale a Rio	Marco	
2009	Natale a Beverly Hills	Emanuele	
2010	Parents and Children: Shake Well Before Using	Patrizio	
2011	The Ages of Love	Cupid	
2013	Niente può fermarci	Augusto	
2013	Three Days Later	Pistacchietto	
2014	The Move of the Penguin	Fabio	
2015	Uno anzi due	Valerio	
2015	Torno indietro e cambio vita	Gilberto Damiani	
2016	Miami Beach	Bobo	
2017	Friends by Chance	Tommi	
2022	Ghiaccio	Michelino	
2023	Romantic Girls	Ivano Tozzi	

=== Television ===
Year	Title	Role	Notes
2008–2011	I liceali	Lucio Pregoni	Main role
2016	Tutti insieme all'improvviso	Luca	Recurring role
