= The Foreshadowing (band) =

Italian doom metal band

- The Foreshadowing during a live performance in Rome

Background information
- Origin: Rome, Italy
- Genres: Gothic metal, doom metal
- Years active: 2005–present
- Label: Cyclone Empire
- Members: Marco I. Benevento; Alessandro Pace; Andrea Chiodetti; Francesco Sosto; Francesco Giulianelli; Jonah Padella
- Past members: Davide Pesola; Andrea Sileo
- Website: theforeshadowing.com

The Foreshadowing is an Italian Gothic doom metal band with ambient influences.

== History ==
The band was officially formed in 2005, but the project was actually started back in 1998, from an idea of Alessandro Pace (aka Alex Vega), who involved his friends Andrea Chiodetti (guitar) and Francesco Sosto (keyboards) with the idea of starting up a new gothic doom metal band in the vein of My Dying Bride, Katatonia and Anathema, revisiting the sound of these bands in a modern key and with a personal style. Soon the trio was forced to put aside the project, as they could not find the right members to fill the band up.

After a long period of other experiences in various band (Klimt 1918, Spiritual Front, Grimness), they rejoined again and found the spur to take in the old doom metal project again. Soon they were joined by Jonah Padella (drums) and Davide Pesola (bass), two old acquaintances of the underground metal scene in Rome. A couple of months later they engaged Marco Benevento, vocalist and mastermind of the Italian doom band How Like a Winter, who was the missing link to complete the line up.

Their debut album, Days of Nothing, was recorded in 2006 and mixed by Giuseppe Orlando (Novembre) at Outer Sound Studios in Rome. Days of Nothing is a concept album about an imaginary apocalypse wished by an insane ordinary man. After the releases the band signs to English cult label Candlelight Records. On 22 October 2007 Days of Nothing was issued under the historical label, receiving praise from most of the critics. Recently The Foreshadowing announced their official endorsement with Jackson Guitars USA.

In early 2010, The Foreshadowing announced the release of their second album Oionos, whose release date was set in April 2010 and contemporary made public their signing a new deal with German label Cyclone Empire Records. A cover version of "Russians" by Sting was included in the album tracklist.

On 20 April 2012, The Foreshadowing released their third album, Second World. It completes a conceptual trilogy that spans the band's first three albums. In 2013, Jonah Padella left the band, and the band's longtime producer Giuseppe Orlando replaced him on drums. It is followed by their 2016 album Seven Heads, Ten Horns.

== Members ==
=== Current ===
- Marco I. Benevento – vocals (2005–present)
- Alessandro Pace – guitar (2005–present)
- Francesco Sosto – keyboards (2005–present)
- Giuseppe Orlando – drums (2013–present)

=== Former ===
- Andrea Chiodetti – guitar (2005–2019)
- Jonah Padella – drums (2005–2013)
- Davide Pesola – bass (2005–2010)
- Francesco Giulianelli – bass (2010–2016)
- Michele Attolino – bass (2016–2022)

== Discography ==
- Days of Nothing (2007)
- Oionos (2010)
- Second World (2012)
- Seven Heads Ten Horns (2016)
- New Wave Order (2024)
