= Second World (album) =

Studio album by The Foreshadowing
- Released: 20 April 2012
- Recorded: September 2011 to February 2012
- Studios: Outer Sound Studios, Rome
- Genres: Gothic metal, doom metal
- Length: 55:11
- Label: Cyclone Empire

The Foreshadowing chronology
Oionos (2010)	Second World (2012)

Professional ratings
Review scores
Source	Rating
Metal Reviews	82/100
Metal.de	8/10
Metal1.info	8/10

Second World is the third studio album by Italian gothic doom metal band The Foreshadowing, released on 20 April 2012 by Cyclone Empire Records.

Second World combines cinematic atmospheres with doom-metal riffs. The album was mixed by Dan Swanö at Unisound Studios (Örebro, Sweden), while well-known artist Travis Smith worked on the album illustrations and design. The recording sessions were held at Outer Sound Studios in Rome with Giuseppe Orlando.

Guitarist Alessandro Pace stated: "This is going to be, without any reasonable doubt, absolutely metal. We worked hard to step forward and gain our melodic side, while at the same time, we wrote the most groundbreaking rhythms we ever played. This is going to be an album with no compromises; it's going to be a blast!"

Keyboardist Francesco Sosto commented: "With Second World, we wanted to demonstrate that our band knows how to use the work we did in the past, as the major source of inspiration for this work were our two previous albums. But we also wanted to add something new, like true Gregorian choirs and acoustic parts, and also tried to structure the songs in a different way from how we normally do, as we did with “Colonies”.

== Track listing ==
1. Havoc – 7:22
2. Outcast – 4:51
3. The Forsaken Son – 4:41
4. Second World – 5:38
5. Aftermaths – 6:29
6. Ground Zero – 4:31
7. Reverie Is a Tyrant – 5:16
8. Colonies – 6:21
9. Noli Timere – 6:01
10. Friends of Pain – 4:01

== Personnel ==
- Marco Benevento – vocals
- Alessandro Pace – guitars
- Andrea Chiodetti – guitars
- Francesco Sosto – keyboards
- Francesco Giulianelli – bass
- Jonah Padella – drums

Production

- Mixed and mastered by Dan Swanö
- Recorded at Outer Sound Studios in Rome with Giuseppe Orlando

Cover art

- Design by Travis Smith
