= Ludovico Fremont =

Italian actor

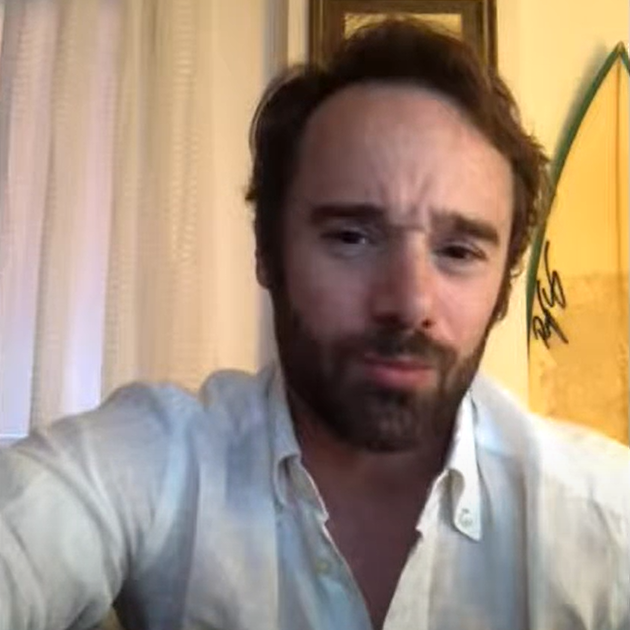
- Ludovico Fremont
- Born: 26 September 1982 (age 43); Rome, Italy
- Years active: 1999–present

Ludovico Fremont (born 26 September 1982) is an Italian actor.

== Biography ==
From 1992 to 1994 he studied acting at the Nazarene College in Rome, then attended the National Academy of Dramatic Art Silvio D'Amico graduated in 2004. Also in 2004, takes part in theater in La Centaura in the role of "Centaurino" with Mariangela Melato directed by Luca Ronconi.

== Career ==
=== Debut ===
He debuted on TV in the second series of Lui e lei in 1999, with Enrico Mutti and Vittoria Belvedere. In 2006, his popularity grew by participating in the TV series I Cesaroni, in which he acted in the role of Walter Masetti, best friend of Marco Cesaroni (played by Matteo Branciamore).

=== 2007-2008: Scrivilo sui muri and other projects ===
In 2007, he acted in his first movie: Scrivilo sui muri, starring with Cristiana Capotondi and Primo Reggiani, directed by Giancarlo Scarchilli with the participation of the singer Dolcenera. Also in 2007, he won, in tandem with Silvia Fontana, the second edition of Notti sul ghiaccio (Nights on the ice), led by Milly Carlucci on Rai 1. Still on his film career with the film Noi due, directed by Enzo Papetti, in which he plays the protagonist in the role of Jericho.

=== 2009-2011 6 Days on Earth ===
In 2009, he acted in 6 Days on Earth and Natale a Rio. In the summer of that year had a minor role in the BBC's television movie The Sinking of the Laconia directed by Uwe Janson, alongside Brian Cox, Franka Potente and Ken Duken. In 2011, announced that he no longer participated in the cast of I Cesaroni.

== Filmography ==
=== Movies ===
- Noi Due, directed by Enzo Papetti (2004)
- Scrivilo sui muri, directed by Giancarlo Scarchilli (2007)
- Ultimi della classe, directed by Luca Biglione (2008)
- Natale a Rio, directed by Neri Parenti (2008)
- 6 giorni sulla Terra, directed by Varo Venturi (2011)
- Presto farà giorno, directed by Giuseppe Ferlito (2014)
- The Answer, la risposta sei tu, Ludovico Fremont, (2015)

=== Television ===
- La stagione dei delitti, directed by Claudio Bonivento (2004)
- Lui e lei 2, directed by Elisabetta Lodoli e Luciano Manuzzi - Episodio Il campione (1999)
- Distretto di Polizia, directed by Renato De Maria - 2 episodio (2000)
- Angelo il custode, directed by Gianfranco Lazotti (2001)
- Cuccioli, directed by Paolo Poeti - Episodio: Una piccola peste (2002)
- Carabinieri, directed by Raffaele Mertes - 3 episodes (2002)
- Distretto di Polizia 3, directed by Monica Vullo - Episodio: Di padre in figlio (2002)
- La stagione dei delitti, directed by Claudio Bonivento (2004)
- Padri e figli, directed by Gianfranco Albano e Gianni Zanasi (2005)
- I Cesaroni, various directors (2006-2010)
- L'amore e la guerra, directed by Giacomo Campiotti (2007)
- Bakhita, directed by Giacomo Campiotti (2009)
- The Sinking of the Laconia, Directed by Uwe Janson (2011)
- La figlia del capitano, directed by Giacomo Campiotti (2012)
- Che Dio ci aiuti, directed by Francesco Vicario (2013)
- Un'altra vita, directed by Cinzia TH Torrini (2014)
- Che Dio Ci Aiuti , directed by Francesco Vicario (2014)

=== Teathre ===
- No al fascismo, directed by Mario Ferrero (2002)
- L'istruttoria, directed by Pino Passalaqua (2003)
- La centaura, directed by Luca Ronconi (2004)
- Processo a Nerone, directed by Giorgio Ferrara (2006)
- Il marito di mio figlio, directed by Daniele Falleri (2013)
- Uomini senza donne, directed by Angelo Longoni (2015)
