= The Ages of Love =

- Directed by: Giovanni Veronesi
- Written by: Ugo Chiti; Giovanni Veronesi
- Produced by: Aurelio De Laurentiis
- Starring: Carlo Verdone; Robert De Niro; Monica Bellucci; Laura Chiatti; Riccardo Scamarcio; Michele Placido; Valeria Solarino; Emanuele Propizio; Donatella Finocchiaro
- Music by: Massimiliano Lazzaretti
- Release date: 25 February 2011
- Running time: 120 minutes
- Country: Italy
- Language: Italian

The Ages of Love (Italian: Manuale d'amore 3, also known as Manual of Love 3) is a 2011 Italian romantic comedy film consisting of three segments. It was directed by Giovanni Veronesi, and it is a sequel of Manual of Love (2005) and Manual of Love 2 (2007).

== Plot ==
The film is composed of three episodes, connected through a young taxi driver who plays Cupid. Each episode follows a different couple:

- Giovinezza (youth): Roberto and Micol;
- Maturità (maturity): Fabio and Eliana;
- Oltre (beyond): Adrian and Viola.

In the first story, Roberto is a lawyer sent to a rural town in Tuscany to convince a family of old farmers to sell their land. They are reluctant to accept the offer, so Roberto stays for a few days. He spends his time in the company of locals, where he meets Micol, a beautiful young woman who flirts with him. They have fun together and one night, they kiss and make love on a beach. But Roberto has a fiance, Sara, who calls him every day to say how she misses him. Roberto is quite uneasy about settling down and getting married. Torn by his feelings, Roberto comes to Micol's house for a serious talk, but finds out that she is married to a wealthy businessman. Realizing that they have no future together, Roberto and Micol part ways. Sara comes to take him, but before leaving town, Roberto urges the farmers to stand for their land.

In the second story, Fabio is a famous news anchor on TG La7. At a party, he meets a woman and they begin to see each other. She offers casual sex with Fabio, which leads to a few encounters. When one of the encounters ends with damage to a police car, Fabio learns that Elaine is suffering from bipolar disorder and has a history of mental breakdowns. He tries to end the affair, but she begins to stalk him, threatening him with a recording of them having sex, and eventually tearing down his apartment.

His wife and daughter leave after he discloses his infidelity, and Fabio has a breakdown on live air, after which he is demoted to a field reporter in Africa. On his way to the airport, he is called to the mental institution where Elaine is being treated for chronic depression. She bids him farewell and gives him the keys to her apartment, where he retrieves the video recording and an awkward farewell poem. On his way out, he encounters Adrian, and it is revealed that Fabio was taken hostage by terrorists.

In the final story, Adrian is a retired professor of art history from Boston who lives alone in his Rome apartment. His only friend is Augusto, the house concierge, who one day is visited by his daughter Viola, a beautiful fashion model from Paris. Although Adrian has shied away from contact with women for years, he is immediately attracted to her. After he fights an abusive former boyfriend, Viola takes interest in Adrian and learns that he had serious health problems, having gone through a heart transplant operation that left him physically and emotionally scarred. After a fierce argument with her father, Viola knocks on Adrian's door, for she has nowhere else to go.

Augusto comes to Adrian and is furious to disclose that Viola is actually a stripper and has incurred a large debt. Adrian and Viola spend an evening revealing their stories. Adrian suffered from depression after his operation, which ended his marriage, and Viola tried to open a restaurant with a loan from local gangsters, but did not succeed. They spend the night together. Viola wants to leave town, not wanting to cause trouble to anyone, but Adrian professes his love to her and they embrace. In the end, they move to a small town to have their first child, and Adrian secretly settled Viola's debt.

== Cast ==
- Carlo Verdone as Fabio
- Robert De Niro as Adrian
- Monica Bellucci as Viola
- Riccardo Scamarcio as Roberto
- Michele Placido as Augusto
- Valeria Solarino as Sara
- Laura Chiatti as Micol
- Donatella Finocchiaro as Eliana
- Emanuele Propizio as Cupid
- Paolo Ferrari as President
- Maura Leone as the journalist
- Lella Costa as Eliana Rame, the psychiatrist of Gaia
- Dario Ballantini as the traffic policeman in Castiglione della Pescaia
- Guido Genovesi as the seer in Castiglione della Pescaia
- Carlo Monni as Ettore Michelacci
- Ralph Palka as husband of Micol
- Giusi Cataldo as Adriana, Fabio's wife
- Marina Rocco as Giorgia
- Ubaldo Pantani as Svanito Michelacci
- Vincenzo Alfieri as Francesco

== Production ==
The film is set in Castiglione della Pescaia and Rome. Filming began in Rome on 24 September 2010 and in Castiglione della Pescaia on 18 October. The final scene with De Niro and Monica Bellucci was filmed in the Villa Pizzetti Hospital in Grosseto on 20 October. Locations in Rome used for the film include the Pontifical University of Saint Thomas Aquinas, Angelium

== See also ==
- List of Italian films of 2011
