= Ferruccio Amendola =

Italian voice actor (1930–2001)

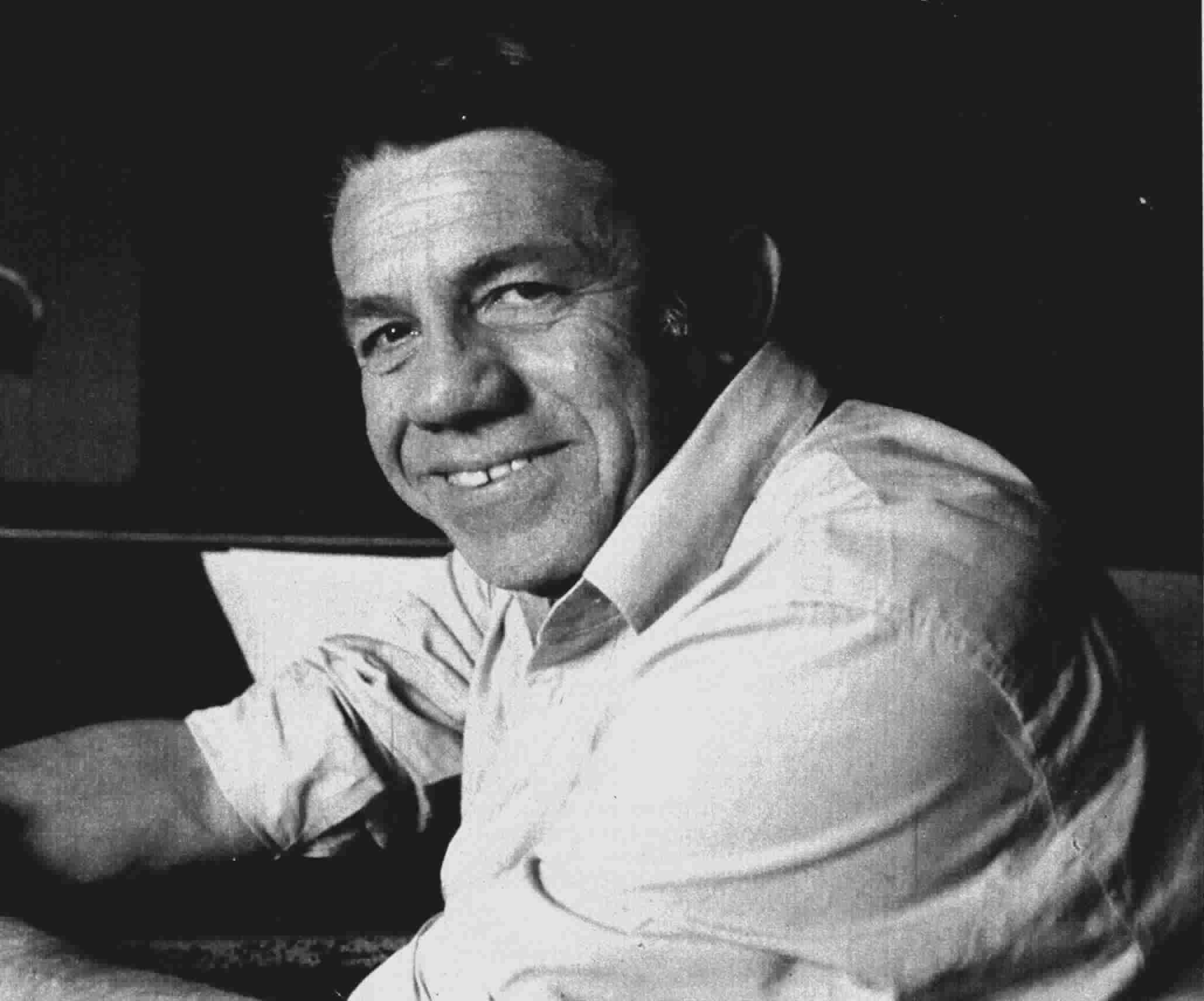
- Amendola in 1985
- Born: 22 July 1930; Turin, Italy
- Died: 3 September 2001 (aged 71); Rome, Italy
- Occupations: Actor; voice actor; dubbing director
- Years active: 1943–2001
- Height: 1.69 m (5 ft 7 in)
- Spouse: Rita Savagnone (m. 1958; div. 1971)
- Children: 3, including Claudio Amendola
- Relatives: Mario Amendola (uncle); Alessia Amendola (granddaughter)

Ferruccio Amendola (22 July 1930 – 3 September 2001) was an Italian actor and voice actor.

== Biography ==
Born in Turin to actors Federico Amendola and Amelia Ricci and the nephew of director and screenwriter Mario Amendola, he was among Italy's most accomplished actors who worked for cinema and television and also did extensive voice dubbing work. Amendola moved to Rome with his family at a young age and he made his film debut at age 13 in Gian Burrasca directed by Sergio Tofano and continued working on cinema, television and theatre in his later years.

In 1945, Amendola made his voice-over debut dubbing over Vito Annicchiarico's role in the film Rome, Open City. By 1968, Amendola began devoting most of his time to voice-over acting and eventually became well known as an Italian voice dubbing pioneer. He was best known as the Italian voice of famous actors including Al Pacino, Sylvester Stallone, Dustin Hoffman, Robert De Niro and Tomas Milian in a majority of their movies. He also dubbed Peter Falk as well as Bill Cosby in the television series The Cosby Show as well as Cosby. In addition, he has done the voice over in commercials and TV dramas with great success.

=== Personal life ===
From his relationship with his ex-wife Rita Savagnone who is a voice-over actress, he had two sons, Federico, who was named after his father and Claudio, who is also an actor. He also had a daughter, Silvia from his second marriage. Through Claudio, his granddaughter Alessia Amendola is a voice actress.

== Death ==
Amendola died of throat cancer in Rome on 3 September 2001 at the age of 71. He was interred at the Campo Verano.

== Filmography ==
=== Cinema ===
Year	Title	Role	Notes
1943	Gian Burrasca	Collegiate	
1948	Eleven Men and a Ball	Alfredo’s friend	
1954	Avanzi di galera	Maffei	
1955	Le signorine dello 04	Bruna’s brother	
1955	Land of the Pharaohs	Egyptian architect	Uncredited
1955	La ragazza di Via Veneto	Seppia's friend	
1957	Sette canzoni per sette sorelle	Gastone	
1957	I dritti	Roberto	
1958	La zia d'America va a sciare	Gino Moliconi	
1958	Napoli, sole mio!	Agostino	
1958	The Bullies	Alfredo Pinelli	
1958	Gagliardi e pupe	Romoletto	
1959	Fantasmi e ladri	Cipolla	
1959	More Bullies Than Before	Alfredo Pinelli	
1959	The Great War	Private De Concini	
1959	La cento chilometri	Elena’s brother	
1959	Simpatico mascalzone	Pirola	
1960	La banda del buco	Alfredo	
1962	Those Two in the Legion	Gérard	Uncredited
1963	Follie d'estate	Galletto	
1963	Vino, whisky e acqua salata	Calò	
1964	The Thief of Damascus	Tisba	
1964	The Terror of Rome Against the Son of Hercules	Dammatius	
1966	Honeymoon, Italian Style	Pasquale	
1967	Marinai in coperta	Ferruccio	
1967	Riderà	Sandro	
1967	Mad Heart... Mad as a Hatter	Sandro	
1967	La vuole lui... lo vuole lei		
1968	Donne... botte e bersaglieri	Fabrizio	
1968	Vacanze sulla Costa Smeralda	Nando Nardini	
1970	Lacrime d'amore	Giampiero Maroschi	
1977	Three Tigers Against Three Tigers	Control Tower Officer	Third segment
1980	Everything Happens to Me	Phil Howard	

=== Television ===
Year	Title	Role	Notes
1956	Lui e lei		Variety show
1958	La via del successo		Variety show
1967	TuttoTotò		1 episode
1975	Processo per l'uccisione di Raffaele Sonzogno giornalista romano		TV miniseries
1976	Extra	Jones	TV miniseries
1982	Storia d'amore e d'amicizia	Settimio	TV miniseries
1984	Quei trentasei gradini	Pietro	TV miniseries
1987	Little Roma	Ulisse	TV miniseries
1990–1992	Pronto soccorso	Dr. Aiace	Main cast

== Voice work ==
Year	Title	Role	Notes
1965	West and Soda	The Boss's Horse	Animated film
1969	Il cavaliere inesistente	Rinaldo	Animated film
1971	The Adventures of Pinocchio	Punch	Animated film
1971	The Adventures of Pinocchio	The Innkeeper	Animated film
1985	Amici più di prima	Narrator	Comedy
1999	The Legend of the Titanic	Icetooth	Animated film

=== Dubbing ===
==== Films (Animation, Italian dub) ====
Year	Title	Role(s)	Ref
1961	The Orphan Brother	Yakkogashira No Gonroku	
1967	Cinderella	Gus (1967 redub)	
1968	Asterix and Cleopatra	Tournevis	
1970	30,000 Miles Under the Sea	Tail	
1998	Antz	Corporal Weaver	
2004	The Adventures of Ichabod and Mr. Toad	Brom Bones (2004 redub)	

==== Films (Live action, Italian dub) ====
Year	Title	Role(s)	Original actor	Ref
1948	Yellow Sky	Bull Run	Robert Arthur	
1954	Papa, Mama, the Maid and I	Neighbor	René-Jean Chauffard	
1955	Mister Roberts	Mannion	Philip Carey	
1956	The Fastest Gun Alive	Dink Wells	Noah Beery Jr.	
1956	Never Say Goodbye	Andy Leonard	Max Showalter	
1956	Never Say Goodbye	Will	Clint Eastwood	
1957	Holiday Island	Franco	Maurizio Arena	
1957	Three Violent People	Rafael Ortega	Robert Blake	
1957	Doctor at Large	Police Constable	Cyril Chamberlain	
1957	The Midnight Story	Frank Wilkins	James Hyland	
1958	Marinai, donne e guai	Raffaele Menotti	Giampiero Littera	
1958	Too Much, Too Soon	Charlie Snow	Murray Hamilton	
1959	A Private's Affair	Mike Conroy	Gary Crosby	
1959	Holiday for Lovers	Paul Gattling	Gary Crosby	
1959	Never So Few	John Danforth	Charles Bronson	
1960	The Ladies	Maurotto	Giampiero Littera	
1960	I Aim at the Stars	Dr. Neumann	Peter Capell	
1961	The Canadians	Billy	Richard Alden	
1962	The Gentleman from Epsom	Charly	Jean Lefebvre	
1962	The Longest Day	John Steele	Red Buttons	
1963	Implacable Three	Hombre de Bardon	Aldo Sambrell	
1963	Little Caesar	Arnie Lorch (1963 dubbing)	Maurice Black	
1964	The Gallant Musketeer	Henri III	Jacques Castelot	
1965	The Escape	Alberto	Maurizio Arena	
1965	The Relentless Four	Comisario	Cris Huerta	
1965	Gendarme in New York	Lucien Fougasse	Jean Lefebvre	
1965	The Slender Thread	Judd Ridley	Ed Asner	
1965	Morituri	Donkeyman	Hans Christian Blech	
1966	Django	Miguel	Simón Arriaga	
1966	Navajo Joe	Monkey	Simón Arriaga	
1966	Alfie	Harry Clamacraft	Alfie Bass	
1967	Golden Chameleon	Cassaforte	Giampiero Littera	
1967	Chuka	Otto Hansbach	Ernest Borgnine	
1967	Il ragazzo che sapeva amare	Vittorio	Vittorio Congia	
1967	The Dirty Dozen	Robert T. Jefferson	Jim Brown	
1967	In the Heat of the Night	Sam Wood	Warren Oates	
1968	The Boston Strangler	Frank McAfee	Murray Hamilton	
1968	No Way to Treat a Lady	Bartender	Val Avery	
1968	Greetings	Jon Rubin	Robert De Niro	
1968	Dark of the Sun	Sergeant Ruffo	Jim Brown	
1968	Ice Station Zebra	Leslie Anders	Jim Brown	
1968	Train for Durango	Captain of Mexican Army	Aldo Sambrell	
1968	Never a Dull Moment	Bobby Macoon	Richard Bakalyan	
1968	The Biggest Bundle of Them All	Benny Brownstead	Godfrey Cambridge	
1968	Blue	Jess Parker	Anthony Costello	
1968	Chitty Chitty Bang Bang	Mr. Coggins	Desmond Llewelyn	
1968	Chitty Chitty Bang Bang	Second Spy	Bernard Spear	
1969	Midnight Cowboy	Enrico Salvatore "Ratso" Rizzo	Dustin Hoffman	
1969	100 Rifles	Sheriff Lyedecker	Jim Brown	
1969	The Extraordinary Seaman	W.J. Oglethorpe	Mickey Rooney	
1969	The Reivers	Ned McCaslin	Rupert Crosse	
1970	Hi, Mom!	Jon Rubin	Robert De Niro	
1970	Little Big Man	Jack Crabb	Dustin Hoffman	
1970	Le Gendarme en balade	Jérôme Gerber	Michel Galabru	
1970	Husbands	Gus Demetri	John Cassavetes	
1970	They Call Me Mister Tibbs!	Lieutenant Kenner	David Sheiner	
1970	Tora! Tora! Tora!	Harold Kaminski	Neville Brand	
1970	The Out-of-Towners	Barney Polaczek	Ron Carey	
1970	M*A*S*H	Walter "The Painless Pole" Waldowski	John Schuck	
1971	Straw Dogs	David Sumner	Dustin Hoffman	
1971	Who Is Harry Kellerman?	Georgie Soloway	Dustin Hoffman	
1971	The Panic in Needle Park	Bobby	Al Pacino	
1971	Er Più – storia d'amore e di coltello	Bartolo Di Lorenzo	Maurizio Arena	
1971	Two Males for Alexa	Max	Eduardo Calvo	
1972	Alfredo, Alfredo	Alfredo Sbisà	Dustin Hoffman	
1972	The Godfather	Michael Corleone	Al Pacino	
1972	Pete 'n' Tillie	Pete Seltzer	Walter Matthau	
1972	What Am I Doing in the Middle of a Revolution?	Mendoza	Simón Arriaga	
1972	Storia di fifa e di coltello - Er seguito der Più	Bartolo Di Lorenzo	Maurizio Arena	
1972	Ben and Charlie	Alan Smith	Vittorio Congia	
1972	God in Heaven... Arizona on Earth	Duffy	Roberto Camardiel	
1972	Man of La Mancha	Sancho Panza / Cervantes' manservant	James Coco	
1973	No Place to Hide	Jerry Savage	Sylvester Stallone	
1973	Serpico	Frank Serpico	Al Pacino	
1973	Papillon	Louis Dega	Dustin Hoffman	
1973	The Godson of the Godfather	Don Vincenzo Russo	Maurizio Arena	
1973	A Story of Brothers and Knives	Nino Romagnoli	Maurizio Arena	
1973	Società a responsabilità molto limitata	Gaetano Stipoli	Maurizio Arena	
1973	Storia di karatè, pugni e fagioli	Piccolo	Cris Huerta	
1973	The Stone Killer	Guido Lorenz	David Sheiner	
1973	The Three Musketeers	Porthos	Frank Finlay	
1974	Busting	Patrick Farrell	Robert Blake	
1974	The Godfather Part II	Michael Corleone	Al Pacino	
1974	Almost Human	Giulio Sacchi	Tomas Milian	
1974	A Woman Under the Influence	Nick Longhetti	Peter Falk	
1974	Charleston	Barabas Smith	Dominic Barto	
1974	To Love Ophelia	Spartaco	Maurizio Arena	
1974	The Front Page	Walter Burns	Walter Matthau	
1974	The Great Gatsby	George Wilson	Scott Wilson	
1975	Silent Action	Mario Sperli	Tomas Milian	
1975	Syndicate Sadists	Rambo	Tomas Milian	
1975	The Return of the Pink Panther	Pepi	Graham Stark	
1975	Loaded Guns	Padre Best	Maurizio Arena	
1975	Hallucination Strip	Buscemi "The Sicilian"	Maurizio Arena	
1975	Cry, Onion!	Petrus Lamb	Martin Balsam	
1975	The Gypsy	Jacques Helman	Maurice Barrier	
1975	A Genius, Two Partners and a Dupe	Steam Train Bill	Robert Charlebois	
1976	All the President's Men	Carl Bernstein	Dustin Hoffman	
1976	Taxi Driver	Travis Bickle	Robert De Niro	
1976	1900	Alfredo Berlinghieri	Robert De Niro	
1976	Pure as a Lily	Detective Mike	Graham Stark	
1976	The Tough Ones	Vincenzo Moretto	Tomas Milian	
1976	The Cop in Blue Jeans	Nico Giraldi	Tomas Milian	
1976	Hit Squad	Nico Giraldi	Tomas Milian	
1976	The Twist	Detective	Tomas Milian	
1976	Free Hand for a Tough Cop	Sergio Marazzi	Tomas Milian	
1976	Young, Violent, Dangerous	Commissioner	Tomas Milian	
1976	The Con Artists	Belle Duke Henchman	Sal Borgese	
1976	The Marquise of O	The Count	Bruno Ganz	
1976	Assault on Precinct 13	Special Officer Starker	Charles Cyphers	
1977	New York, New York	Jimmy Doyle	Robert De Niro	
1977	The Cat	Commissioner Francisci	Michel Galabru	
1977	The Cynic, the Rat and the Fist	Luigi "The Chinaman" Maietto	Tomas Milian	
1977	Destruction Force	Luigi "The Chinaman" Maietto	Tomas Milian	
1977	Messalina, Messalina!	Baba	Tomas Milian	
1977	* Swindle	Nico Giraldi	Tomas Milian	
1977	Brothers Till We Die	Sergio Marazzi / Vincenzo Marazzi	Tomas Milian	
1977	The Son of the Sheik	Luigi Abdulio Panacchioni	Tomas Milian	
1977	Hitch-Hike	Adam Konitz	David Hess	
1977	Bobby Deerfield	Bobby Deerfield	Al Pacino	
1977	Rene the Cane	René Bornier	Gérard Depardieu	
1977	Double Game	Danieli	Emanuel Cannarsa	
1977	The Domino Principle	Oscar Spiventa	Mickey Rooney	
1977	Airport '77	Bob Chambers	Robert Foxworth	
1978	Odds and Evens	Ninfus	Sal Borgese	
1978	Paradise Alley	Cosmo Carboni	Sylvester Stallone	
1978	Straight Time	Max Dembo	Dustin Hoffman	
1978	The Brink's Job	Tony Pino	Peter Falk	
1978	The Deer Hunter	Mikhail "Mike" Vronsky	Robert De Niro	
1978	Little Italy	Nico Giraldi	Tomas Milian	
1979	Rocky II	Rocky Balboa	Sylvester Stallone	
1979	Nosferatu the Vampyre	Jonathan Harker	Bruno Ganz	
1979	The Gang That Sold America	Nico Giraldi	Tomas Milian	
1979	Assassination on the Tiber	Nico Giraldi	Tomas Milian	
1979	...And Justice for All	Arthur Kirkland	Al Pacino	
1979	The In-Laws	Vince Ricardo	Peter Falk	
1979	Agatha	Wally Stanton	Dustin Hoffman	
1979	Kramer vs. Kramer	Ted Kramer	Dustin Hoffman	
1980	The House on the Edge of the Park	Alex	David Hess	
1980	Raging Bull	Jake LaMotta	Robert De Niro	
1980	Tony: Another Double Game	Tony	Emanuel Cannarsa	
1980	The Wolf and the Lamb	Cuckoo	Tomas Milian	
1980	Crime at Porta Romana	Nico Giraldi	Tomas Milian	
1980	Le Guignolo	Achille Sureau	Michel Galabru	
1981	Who Finds a Friend Finds a Treasure	Anulu	Sal Borgese	
1981	Manolesta	Gino Quirino	Tomas Milian	
1981	Against Each Other, Practically Friends	Quinto Cecioni	Tomas Milian	
1981	Crime at the Chinese Restaurant	Nico Giraldi / Ciu Ci Ciao	Tomas Milian	
1981	The Woman Next Door	Bernard Coudray	Gérard Depardieu	
1981	Nighthawks	Deke DaSilva	Sylvester Stallone	
1981	Escape to Victory	Robert Hatch	Sylvester Stallone	
1981	Buddy Goes West	Girolamo	Amidou	
1982	The King of Comedy	Rupert Pupkin	Robert De Niro	
1982	Rocky III	Rocky Balboa	Sylvester Stallone	
1982	First Blood	John Rambo	Sylvester Stallone	
1982	Tootsie	Michael Dorsey / Dorothy Michaels	Dustin Hoffman	
1982	Crime on the Highway	Nico Giraldi	Tomas Milian	
1982	Trail of the Pink Panther	Hercule Lajoy	Graham Stark	
1983	Scarface	Tony Montana	Al Pacino	
1983	The Devil and Holy Water	Bruno Marangoni	Tomas Milian	
1984	Rhinestone	Nick Martinelli	Sylvester Stallone	
1984	Love Streams	Robert Harmon	John Cassavetes	
1984	Crime in Formula One	Nico Giraldi	Tomas Milian	
1984	Cop in Drag	Nico Giraldi	Tomas Milian	
1984	Once Upon a Time in America	David "Noodles" Aaronson	Robert De Niro	
1984	Falling in Love	Frank Raftis	Robert De Niro	
1984	Birdy	Mr. Columbato	Sandy Baron	
1985	Revolution	Tom Dobb	Al Pacino	
1985	Rocky IV	Rocky Balboa	Sylvester Stallone	
1985	Rambo: First Blood Part II	John Rambo	Sylvester Stallone	
1985	Back to the Future	Dr. Emmett "Doc" Brown	Christopher Lloyd	
1986	Salvador	Richard Boyle	James Woods	
1986	Ishtar	Chuck Clarke	Dustin Hoffman	
1986	Cobra	Marion "Cobra" Cobretti	Sylvester Stallone	
1987	They Call Me Renegade	Moose	Norman Bowler	
1987	The Untouchables	Al Capone	Robert De Niro	
1987	Over the Top	Lincoln "Linc" Hawk	Sylvester Stallone	
1987	Best Seller	Cleve	James Woods	
1988	Midnight Run	Jack Walsh	Robert De Niro	
1988	Rain Man	Raymond Babbitt	Dustin Hoffman	
1988	Rambo III	John Rambo	Sylvester Stallone	
1988	Vibes	Harry Buscafusco	Peter Falk	
1988	Camille Claudel	Auguste Rodin	Gérard Depardieu	
1989	Jacknife	Joseph "Megs" Megessey	Robert De Niro	
1989	We're No Angels	Ned	Robert De Niro	
1989	Tango & Cash	Raymond "Ray" Tango	Sylvester Stallone	
1989	Lock Up	Frank Leone	Sylvester Stallone	
1989	Sea of Love	Frank Keller	Al Pacino	
1989	Family Business	Vito McMullen	Dustin Hoffman	
1990	Tune in Tomorrow	Pedro Carmichael	Peter Falk	
1990	Awakenings	Leonard Lowe	Robert De Niro	
1990	Goodfellas	Jimmy "The Gent" Conway	Robert De Niro	
1990	Stanley & Iris	Stanley Cox	Robert De Niro	
1990	Ghost Dad	Elliot Hopper	Bill Cosby	
1990	Dick Tracy	Alphonse "Big Boy" Caprice	Al Pacino	
1990	The Godfather Part III	Michael Corleone	Al Pacino	
1990	Rocky V	Rocky Balboa	Sylvester Stallone	
1990	Two Evil Eyes	Roderick Usher	Harvey Keitel	
1991	Billy Bathgate	Dutch Schultz	Dustin Hoffman	
1991	Hook	Captain Hook	Dustin Hoffman	
1991	Guilty by Suspicion	David Merrill	Robert De Niro	
1991	Cape Fear	Max Cady	Robert De Niro	
1991	Backdraft	Donald "Shadow" Rimgale	Robert De Niro	
1991	Frankie and Johnny	Johnny	Al Pacino	
1991	Oscar	Angelo "Snaps" Provolone	Sylvester Stallone	
1992	Mistress	Evan Wright	Robert De Niro	
1992	Night and the City	Harry Fabian	Robert De Niro	
1992	Stop! Or My Mom Will Shoot	Joseph Andrew "Joe" Bomowski	Sylvester Stallone	
1992	Hero	Bernie LaPlante	Dustin Hoffman	
1993	Demolition Man	John Spartan	Sylvester Stallone	
1993	Cliffhanger	Gabriel "Gabe" Walker	Sylvester Stallone	
1993	A Bronx Tale	Lorenzo Anello	Robert De Niro	
1993	This Boy's Life	Dwight Hansen	Robert De Niro	
1993	Mad Dog and Glory	Wayne "Mad Dog" Dobie	Robert De Niro	
1994	The Specialist	Ray Quick	Sylvester Stallone	
1994	Mary Shelley's Frankenstein	The Creation	Robert De Niro	
1994	Timecop	Aaron McComb	Ron Silver	
1995	Outbreak	Sam Daniels	Dustin Hoffman	
1995	Heat	Neil McCauley	Robert De Niro	
1995	Roommates	Rocky Holzcek	Peter Falk	
1995	Judge Dredd	Judge Joseph Dredd	Sylvester Stallone	
1995	Assassins	Robert Rath / Joseph Rath	Sylvester Stallone	
1995	Two Bits	Grandpa	Al Pacino	
1996	Sleepers	Robert "Bobby" Carillo	Robert De Niro	
1996	Marvin's Room	Dr. Wally	Robert De Niro	
1996	The Fan	Gil Renard / Curly	Robert De Niro	
1996	Daylight	Kit Latura	Sylvester Stallone	
1996	American Buffalo	Teach	Dustin Hoffman	
1997	Cop Land	Moe Tilden	Robert De Niro	
1997	Jackie Brown	Louis Gara	Robert De Niro	
1997	Wag the Dog	Conrad Brean	Robert De Niro	
1997	Mad City	Max Brackett	Dustin Hoffman	
1997	An Alan Smithee Film: Burn Hollywood Burn	Sylvester Stallone	Sylvester Stallone	
1998	Sphere	Dr. Norman Goodman	Dustin Hoffman	
1999	Analyze This	Paul Vitti	Robert De Niro	
1999	Flawless	Walter Koontz	Robert De Niro	
2000	Men of Honor	Leslie "Billy" Sunday	Robert De Niro	
2000	Get Carter	Jack Carter	Sylvester Stallone	

==== Television (Animation, Italian dub) ====
Year	Title	Role(s)	Notes	Ref
1968	Wacky Races	Narrator	14 episodes	
1995	The Simpsons	Raymond Babbitt	1 episode	

==== Television (Live action, Italian dub) ====
Year	Title	Role(s)	Notes	Original actor	Ref
1966–1971	Zorro	Corporal Reyes	Recurring role (4th voice)	Don Diamond	
1971	Columbo: Ransom for a Dead Man	Lieutenant Columbo	TV film	Peter Falk	
1984–1992	The Cosby Show	Cliff Huxtable	Main cast	Bill Cosby	
1985	Death of a Salesman	Willy Loman	TV film	Dustin Hoffman	
1993	Tequila and Bonetti	Tequila	Main cast	Brad Sanders	
1994–1995	The Cosby Mysteries	Guy Hanks	Main cast	Bill Cosby	
1996–2000	Cosby	Hilton Lucas	Main cast	Bill Cosby	
1999	Alice in Wonderland	The White Knight	TV film	Christopher Lloyd	
