= The Move of the Penguin =

- Film poster
- Italian: La mossa del pinguino
- Directed by: Claudio Amendola
- Written by: Claudio Amendola; Edoardo Leo; Michele Alberico; Giulio Di Martino
- Produced by: Guido De Angelis; Maurizio De Angelis; Nicola De Angelis
- Starring: Ennio Fantastichini; Ricky Memphis; Edoardo Leo; Antonello Fassari; Francesca Inaudi
- Cinematography: Antonio Grambone
- Edited by: Alessio Doglione
- Music by: Giorgio H. Federici
- Release date: November 28, 2013 (Torino)
- Running time: 90 minutes
- Country: Italy
- Language: Italian

The Move of the Penguin (Italian: La mossa del pinguino, also known as The Penguin's Move) is a 2013 Italian comedy film written and directed by Claudio Amendola, as his directorial debut. It stars Edoardo Leo, Ricky Memphis, Antonello Fassari and Ennio Fantastichini in the main roles. It premiered at the 2013 Turin Film Festival.

== Plot ==
Two precarious workers, a pensioner and an old bully discover the sport of curling by chance and convinced of their potential they plan to compete at the 2006 Winter Olympics held in Turin, in which Italy automatically has a qualified team being the host country.

== Cast ==
- Edoardo Leo as Bruno
- Antonello Fassari as Neno
- Ricky Memphis as Salvatore
- Ennio Fantastichini as Ottavio
- Francesca Inaudi as Eva
- Damiano De Laurentis as Yuri
- Sergio Fiorentini as Salvatore's father
- Vittorio Emanuele Propizio as Fabio
- Edoardo Purgatori as Bulletto
- Stefano Fresi as Omone
- Rita Savagnone as Erania
- Barbara Scoppa as Lisa

== See also ==
- List of Italian films of 2013
