= Parents and Children: Shake Well Before Using =

- Directed by: Giovanni Veronesi
- Written by: Giovanni Veronesi; Ugo Chiti; Andrea Agnello
- Produced by: Aurelio De Laurentiis
- Starring: Silvio Orlando; Luciana Littizzetto; Michele Placido; Elena Sofia Ricci; Margherita Buy; Emanuele Propizio; Chiara Passarelli; Andrea Fachinetti; Max Tortora; Piera Degli Esposti
- Cinematography: Giovanni Canevari
- Music by: Andrea Guerra
- Release date: 26 February 2010
- Running time: 110 minutes
- Country: Italy
- Language: Italian

Parents and Children: Shake Well Before Using (Italian: Genitori & figli - Agitare bene prima dell'uso) is a 2010 Italian comedy film directed by Giovanni Veronesi.

== Cast ==
- Silvio Orlando as Gianni
- Luciana Littizzetto as Luisa
- Michele Placido as Alberto
- Margherita Buy as Rossana
- Elena Sofia Ricci as Clara
- Emanuele Propizio as Patrizio "Ubaldolay"
- Andrea Fachinetti as Gigio
- Chiara Passarelli as Nina
- Max Tortora as Mario
- Piera Degli Esposti as Lea
- Neva Leoni as Clarissa
- Barbara Enrichi as the Principal
- Matteo Amata as Ettore Amadesi
- Gianna Nannini as herself
