= Alessia Amendola =

Italian voice actress (born 1984)

- Born: 27 February 1984 (age 42); Rome, Italy
- Occupations: Theatre actress; voice actress; dubbing director; radio presenter
- Years active: 1990–present
- Children: 1
- Parents: Claudio Amendola (father); Marina Grande (mother)
- Relatives: Francesca Neri (stepmother); Ferruccio Amendola (grandfather); Rita Savagnone (grandmother); Deddi Savagnone (great-aunt); Mario Amendola (great-great-uncle)

Alessia Amendola (born 27 February 1984) is an Italian voice actress.

== Biography ==
Born in Rome, Amendola is the daughter of actor Claudio Amendola and the granddaughter of voice actors Ferruccio Amendola and Rita Savagnone.

Amendola started her career at quite a young age. She is the official Italian voice actress of Lindsay Lohan, Kat Dennings, Megan Fox, Amber Tamblyn, Awkwafina, Elliot Page, Michelle Trachtenberg and Danielle Panabaker. Some of her well known Italian dubbed television roles include Max Black (portrayed by Kat Dennings) in 2 Broke Girls, Darlene Alderson (portrayed by Carly Chaikin) in Mr. Robot and Jess Day (portrayed by Zooey Deschanel) in New Girl.

In Amendola's film dubbing roles, she voiced Mikaela Banes (portrayed by Megan Fox) in the Transformers film franchise, Violet Parr in The Incredibles and Incredibles 2 and Gretchen Ross (portrayed by Jena Malone) in Donnie Darko. In her series dubbing roles, she dubbed Lindsay in the first four seasons of Total Drama.

== Dubbing roles ==
=== Animation ===
- Violet Parr in The Incredibles
- Violet Parr in Incredibles 2
- Piper Pinwheeler in Robots
- Young Vitani in The Lion King II: Simba's Pride
- Mikey Blumberg in Recess
- Mikey Blumberg in Recess: All Growed Down
- Lindsay in Total Drama (seasons 1–4)
- Gwen Stacy in The Spectacular Spider-Man
- Maid Marian in Tom and Jerry: Robin Hood and His Merry Mouse
- Dawn in The Barbie Diaries
- Lucy in Animal Kingdom: Let's Go Ape
- Valerie Da Vinci in Despicable Me 3
- Luisa Madrigal in Encanto
- Mai Lee in Scooby-Doo! Mystery Incorporated
- Vexy in The Smurfs 2
- Sara Lavrof in Tad, The Lost Explorer
- Lara in Justin and the Knights of Valour
- Cottontail in Peter Rabbit
- Cottontail in Peter Rabbit 2: The Runaway
- Tuca in Tuca & Bertie
- Homura Akemi in Puella Magi Madoka Magica
- Principal Stringent in ChalkZone

=== Live action ===
- Maggie Peyton in Herbie: Fully Loaded
- Anna Coleman in Freaky Friday
- Lola Steppe in Confessions of a Teenage Drama Queen
- Ashley Albright in Just My Luck
- Diane Howser in Bobby
- Rachel Wilcox in Georgia Rule
- April Booth in Machete
- Lindsay Lohan in Scary Movie 5
- Tara in The Canyons
- Katerina West in Sick Note
- Casey Stuart in Life-Size
- Hayley Stark in Hard Candy
- Juno MacGuff in Juno
- Libby / Boltie in Super
- Ariadne in Inception
- Monica in To Rome with Love
- Izzy in The East
- Stacie Andree in Freeheld
- Courtney Holmes in Flatliners
- Vanya Hargreeves in The Umbrella Academy
- Mikaela Banes in Transformers
- Mikaela Banes in Transformers: Revenge of the Fallen
- Megan Fox in The Dictator
- April O'Neil in Teenage Mutant Ninja Turtles
- April O'Neil in Teenage Mutant Ninja Turtles: Out of the Shadows
- Max Black in 2 Broke Girls
- Norah in Nick & Norah's Infinite Playlist
- Stacey Thompson in Shorts
- Darcy Lewis in Thor
- Darcy Lewis in Thor: The Dark World
- Darcy Lewis in WandaVision
- Gretchen Ross in Donnie Darko
- Rocket in Sucker Punch
- Casey Carlyle in Ice Princess
- Kylie Shines in The Circuit
- Maggie O'Donnell in 17 Again
- Ava Monroe in Cop Out
- Layla Williams in Sky High
- Jane Brooks in Mr. Brooks
- Becca in The Crazies
- Sarah in The Ward
- Brittany Aarons in Stuck in the Suburbs
- Darcy Deeton in Searching for David's Heart
- Joan Girardi in Joan of Arcadia
- Tibby Rollins in The Sisterhood of the Traveling Pants 2
- Kate in Ten Minutes Older: The Trumpet
- Jenny Harper in Two and a Half Men
- Sarah Russell in The Russell Girl
- Darlene Alderson in Mr. Robot
- Jess Day in New Girl
- Zoey Brooks in Zoey 101
- Jenny Humphrey in Gossip Girl
- Lainey Lewis in The Goldbergs
- Courtney Callum in Cow Belles
- Jen Kaznyk in Super 8
- Charlotte Drake in Pretty Little Liars
- Mercedes Jones in Glee
- Rebecca Harper in Brothers & Sisters
- Emily Thorne in Revenge
- Nic Nevin in The Resident
- Andrea Jackson in The Big C
- Odessa Montero in Tower Heist
- Claireece "Precious" Jones in Precious
- Emma Frost in X-Men: First Class
- Dorothy Gale in The Muppets' Wizard of Oz
- Jupiter Jones in Jupiter Ascending
- Harmony in The House Bunny
- Trudy Chacón in Avatar
- Frank Kitchen in The Assignment
- Carmen Lowell in The Sisterhood of the Traveling Pants
- Carly Douglas in The Shaggy Dog
- Luv in Blade Runner 2049
- Sarah Connor in Terminator Genisys
- Ree Dolly in Winter's Bone
- Tiffany Maxwell in Silver Linings Playbook
- Serena Pemberton in Serena
- Dominika Egorova in Red Sparrow
- Kristen Tilson in Cold Creek Manor
- Maddy Phillips in Catch That Kid
- Jess Solomon in The Messengers
- London Tipton in The Suite Life of Zack & Cody
- London Tipton in The Suite Life on Deck
- London Tipton in The Suite Life Movie
- Daphne Reynolds in What a Girl Wants
- Amanda Bynes in The Amanda Show
- Holly Tyler in What I Like About You
- Bianca Stratford in 10 Things I Hate About You
- Paige Dineen in Scorpion
- Alice in Alice in Wonderland
- Zoe in Solstice
- Mary Darling in Pan
- Patrice Dumas in BlacKkKlansman

=== Video games ===
- Violet Parr in The Incredibles
