= Miami Beach (film) =

- Film poster
- Directed by: Carlo Vanzina
- Written by: Carlo Vanzina; Enrico Vanzina
- Produced by: Marco Belardi
- Starring: Ricky Memphis; Paola Minaccioni; Max Tortora; Emanuele Propizio; Giampaolo Morelli
- Cinematography: Enrico Lucidi
- Edited by: Luca Montanari
- Music by: Bruno Zambrini
- Release date: 1 June 2016
- Running time: 88 minutes
- Country: Italy
- Language: Italian

Miami Beach is a 2016 Italian comedy film directed by Carlo Vanzina.

== Cast ==
- Ricky Memphis as Lorenzo
- Paola Minaccioni as Paola
- Max Tortora as Giovanni
- Emanuele Propizio as Bobo
- Giampaolo Morelli as Filippo
- Neva Leoni as Giulia
- Filippo Laganà as Luca
- Camilla Tedeschi as Valentina
- Carola Ripani as Franci
- Maria Vittoria Argenti as Betta
- Mariela Garriga as Carmen
- Nina Strauss as Jennifer
- Francesca Nunzi as Patrizia
- Giorgia Trasselli as aunt Assunta
- Stefano Dragono as uncle Giorgio
- Alessio Del Mastro as Matteo
- Vittorio De Franceschi as Rocco
- Maria Lauria as Vittoria
- Richard Pis as Raoul
- Fredrick Bam Scott as the DJ
