= Francesca Neri =

Italian actress (born 1964)

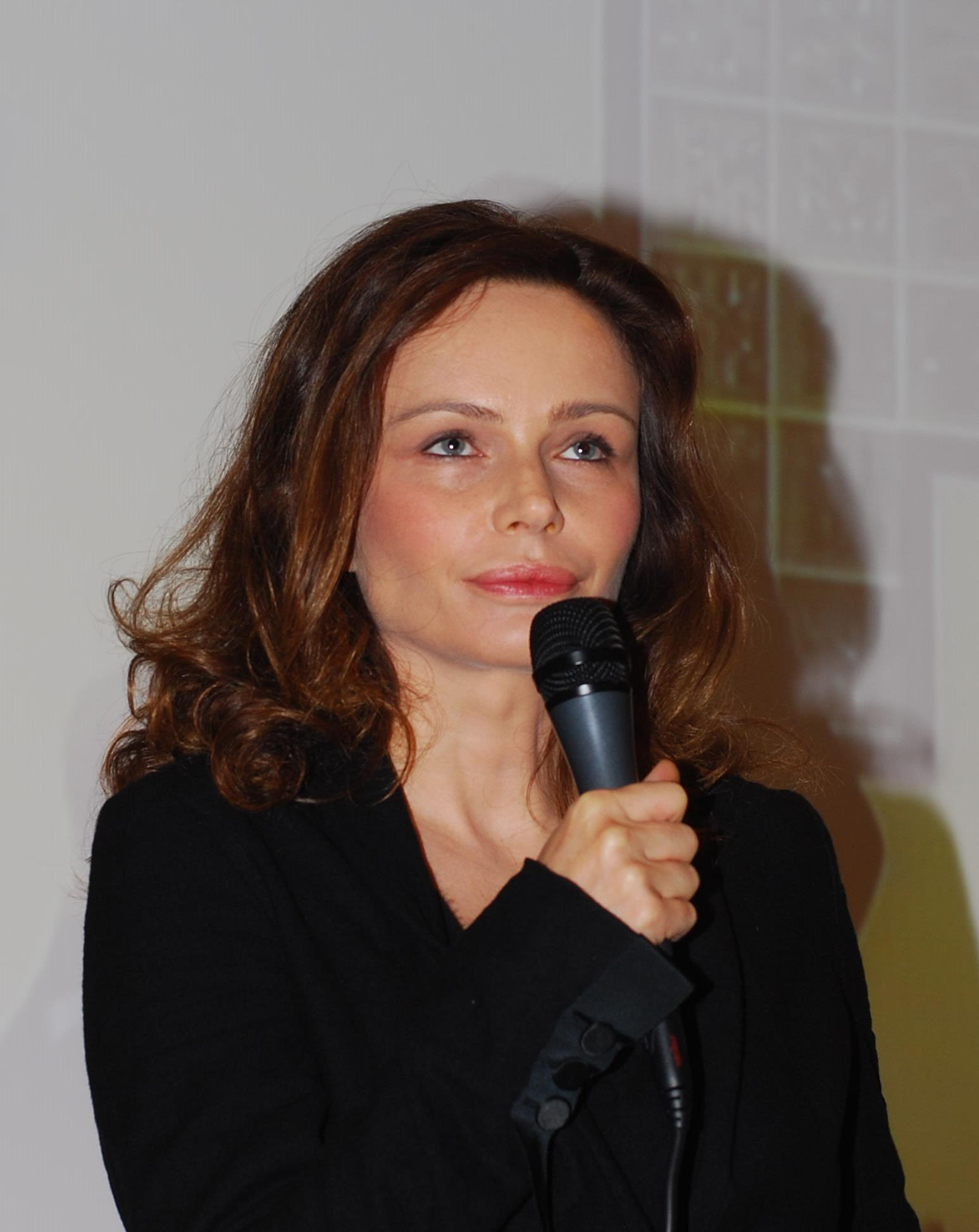
- Neri in 2008
- Born: 10 February 1964 (age 62); Trento, Italy
- Years active: 1986–2016
- Spouse: Claudio Amendola (m. 2010; div. 2022)
- Children: 1

Francesca Neri (born 10 February 1964) is a retired Italian actress.

== Career ==
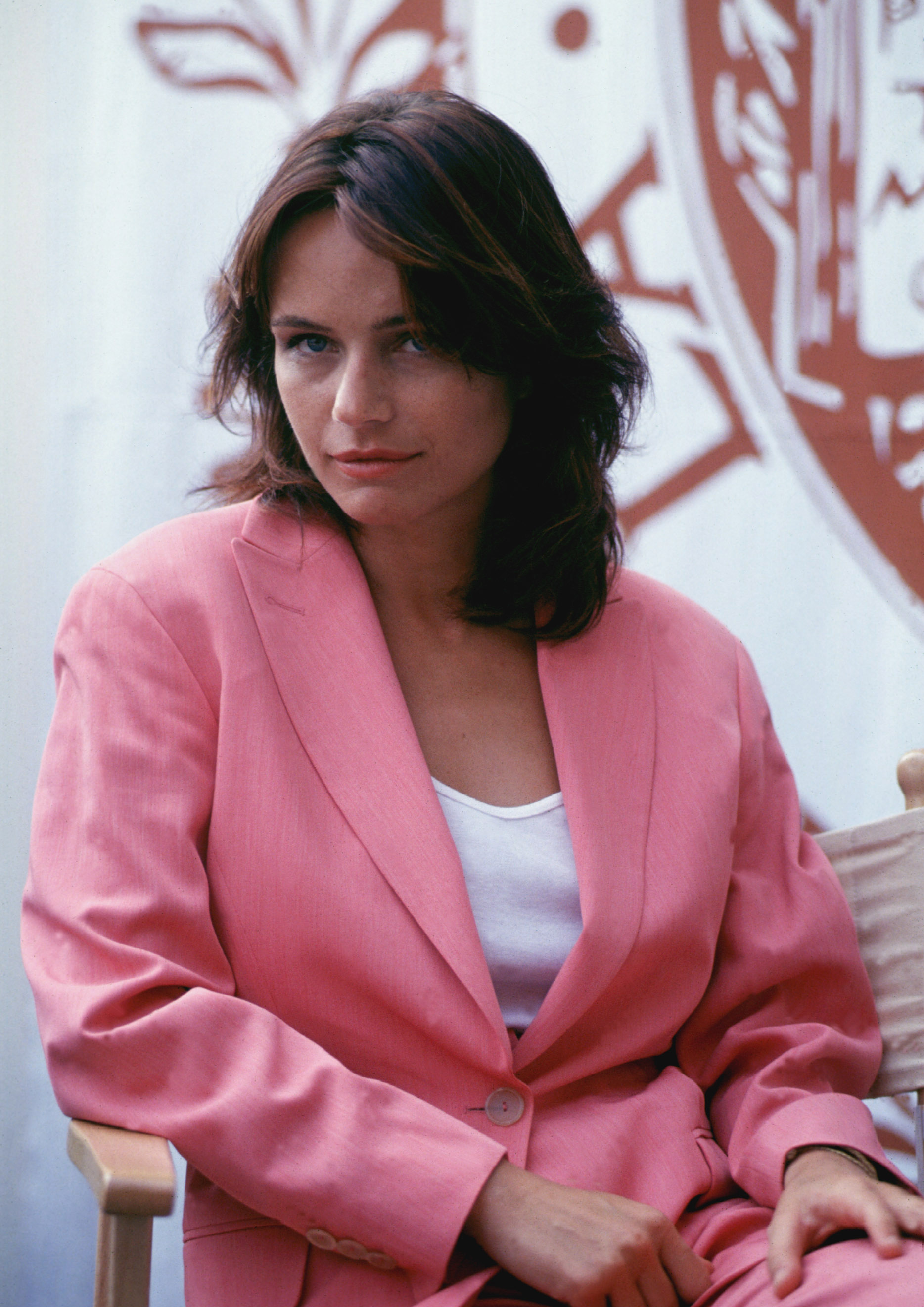
Neri in 1990

Neri was born in Trento, Italy. She has received the Silver Ribbon Award three times, for Best Actress for Pensavo fosse amore, invece era un calesse (1991), directed by Massimo Troisi; Pedro Almadovar's Carne trémula (Live Flesh) (1997), and for Best Supporting Actress for Giovanni's Father (2008).

She has also received three nominations for the David di Donatello Award, for Best Actress in The Sweet Sounds of Life and Io amo Andrea (both 1999), and for Best Supporting Actress for Happiness Costs Nothing (2003).

Notable films include her three films in Spain: Live Flesh (1997, by Pedro Almodóvar), ¡Dispara! (Outrage, 1993, by Carlos Saura), both with her own voice speaking Spanish, and erotic drama film Las edades de Lulú (The Ages of Lulu, 1990, by Bigas Luna, where she's dubbed into Spanish).

After years of acclaimed work in Europe, she took on roles in the United States, with her first major role being Allegra, wife of the Inspector Rinaldo Pazzi in the Hollywood blockbuster Hannibal in 2001. In 2002, she co-starred in Collateral Damage alongside Arnold Schwarzenegger.

== Personal life ==
In 1997, Neri was romantically linked to actor Claudio Amendola, and they were married in 2009. They had a son, Rocco, in 1999. She also has two stepdaughters from Amendola's previous marriage, including voice actress Alessia Amendola. Neri and Amendola were divorced in late 2022.

== Selected filmography ==
Film
Year	Title	Role	Notes
1989	Bankomatt	Maria	
1990	Captain America	Valentina de Santis	
1990	The Ages of Lulu	Lulu	
1991	I thought it was love, but it was a barouche	Cecilia	Nastro d'Argento for Best Actress; Nominated—David di Donatello for Best Actress
1992	Al lupo, al lupo	Livia Sagonà	Golden Pegasus for Best Actress; Nominated—Nastro d'Argento for Best Actress
1992	Sabato italiano	Marina	
1993	The Flight of the Innocent	Marta Rienzi	
1993	¡Dispara!	Ana	
1995	Ivo the Genius	Sara	Nominated—Nastro d'Argento for Best Actress
1996	Bits and Pieces		
1996	My Generation	Giulia	
1997	Live Flesh	Elena	Nastro d'Argento for Best Actress
1997	The Grey Zone	Claudia	
1999	Marriages	Giulia	Nominated—David di Donatello for Best Actress; Nominated—Nastro d'Argento for Best Actress
2000	Io amo Andrea	Andrea	Nominated—David di Donatello for Best Actress
2000	The Sweet Sounds of Life	Sofia	Nominated—David di Donatello for Best Actress; Nominated—Nastro d'Argento for Best Actress
2001	Hannibal	Allegra Pazzi	
2002	Collateral Damage	Selena	
2002	Ginostra	Helena Gigli	
2003	Happiness Costs Nothing	Sara	Nominated—David di Donatello for Best Supporting Actress
2003	Forever	Sara	
2004	The Vanity Serum	Sonia Norton	
2007	A Dinner for Them to Meet	Alma Kero	Nominated—David di Donatello for Best Supporting Actress; Nominated—Nastro d'Argento for Best Supporting Actress
2008	Giovanna's Father	Delia Casali	Nastro d'Argento for Best Supporting Actress
2010	A Second Childhood	Francesca	
2013	A Perfect Family	Alicia	Nominated—David di Donatello for Best Supporting Actress
2014	The Rich, the Pauper and the Butler	Assia	
