= Rita Savagnone =

Italian actress (born 1939)

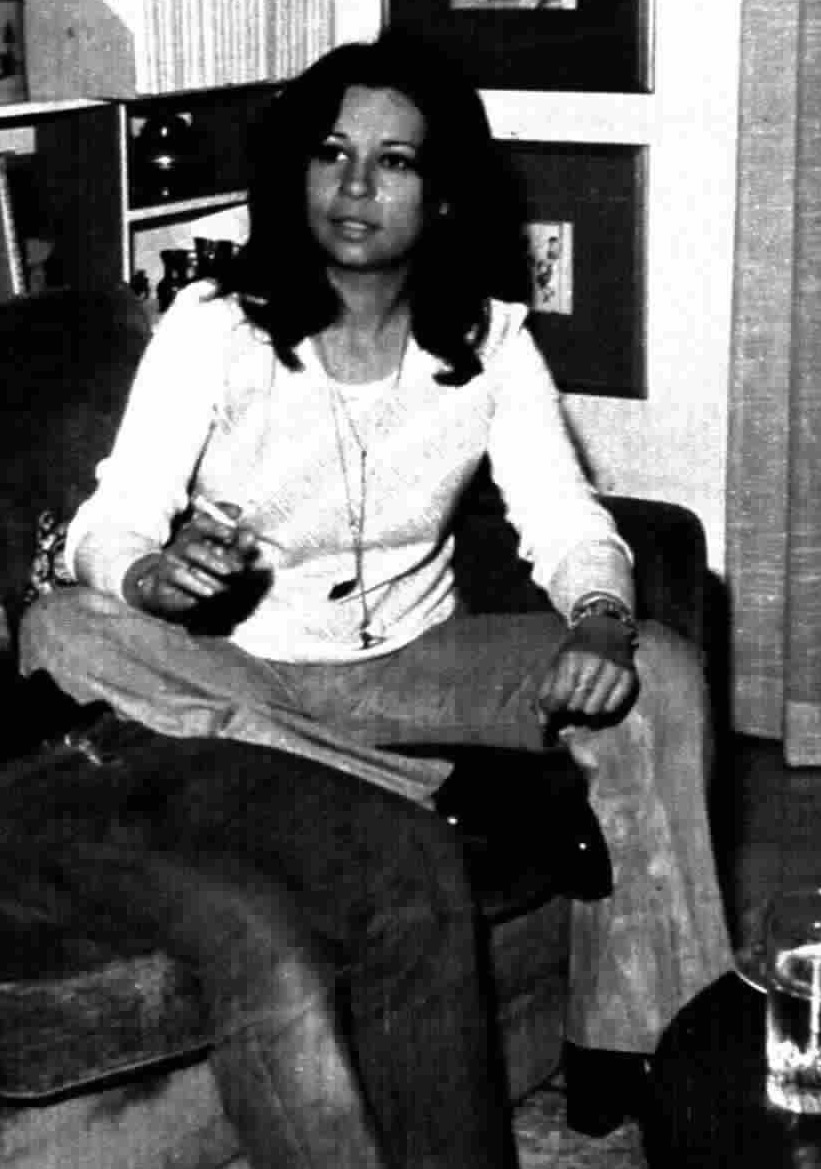
- Savagnone in 1973
- Born: 19 September 1939 (age 86); Rome, Italy
- Occupations: Actress; voice actress; dubbing director
- Years active: 1952–present
- Spouse(s): Ferruccio Amendola (m. 1958; div. 1971) Manlio Santanelli (divorced)
- Children: 2, including Claudio Amendola
- Relatives: Deddi Savagnone (sister); Alessia Amendola (granddaughter)

Rita Savagnone (born 19 September 1939) is an Italian actress and voice actress.

== Biography ==
Born in Rome to Giuseppe Savagnone and Rosella Marraffa and the younger sister of voice actress Deddi Savagnone, She began her acting career at some point during the 1950s. Savagnone is better known to the Italian public as a voice actress. She is the official Italian voice of Vanessa Redgrave, Edwige Fenech and Joan Collins. Other actresses she dubs includes Whoopi Goldberg, Shirley MacLaine, Debbie Reynolds, Liza Minnelli, Farrah Fawcett and more. In Savagnone's animated roles, she voiced Shenzi in the Italian version of The Lion King.

As an actress, Savagnone appeared in over seven films and eight television shows. Her latest film appearance The Move of the Penguin was directed by her son Claudio Amendola.

=== Personal life ===
Savagnone was married to voice actor Ferruccio Amendola from 1958 until 1971. They had two children including actor Claudio Amendola. She was also married to playwright Manlio Santanelli but that marriage also ended in divorce.

== Filmography ==
=== Cinema ===
- Sistemo l'America e torno (1974)
- Chi dice donna dice donna (1976)
- Nenè (1977)
- Big Deal After 20 Years (1985)
- Corruption (1986)
- The Escort (1993)
- The Move of the Penguin (2014)
