= Alien Exorcism =

2011 Italian film

- Film poster
- Italian: 6 Giorni sulla Terra
- Directed by: Varo Venturi
- Written by: Varo Venturi; M. Luisa Fusconi; Giacomo Mondadori
- Starring: Massimo Poggio; Laura Glavan; Marina Kazankova; Ludovico Fremont
- Cinematography: Daniele Baldacci
- Edited by: Varo Venturi
- Music by: Reinhold Heil; Johnny Klimek; Jordan Balagot
- Distributed by: Bolero Film
- Release date: 17 June 2011 (Italy)
- Running time: 101 minutes
- Country: Italy
- Language: Italian

Alien Exorcism (Italian: 6 Giorni sulla Terra), also known as 6 Days on Earth, is a 2011 Italian science fiction film directed by Varo Venturi. It stars Massimo Poggio, Laura Glavan and Marina Kazankova. Supporting actors include Ludovico Fremont and Pier Giorgio Bellocchio. It was shot both in English and Italian.

It has been selected to be featured at the 33° Moscow International Film Festival.

== Premise ==
Dr. Davide Piso is a courageous scientist who has been studying thousands of cases involving alien abductions with the aid of hypnosis. When the scientist decides to help Saturnia, a seductive teenager that believes herself to be an alien abductee and shows a clear attraction for him, he faces an insurmountable problem: once hypnotised, Saturnia cannot leave the trance condition anymore, hence giving manifestation to Hexabor of Ur, an alien entity coming from Mesopotamian ages. Hexabor considers himself a demi-god and wants to exploit a special human energy: the soul.

== Cast ==
- Massimo Poggio as Dr. Davide Piso
- Laura Glavan as Saturnia / Hexabor of Ur
- Marina Kazankova as Elena
- Ludovico Fremont as Leo
- Varo Venturi as Father Trismegisto
- Pier Giorgio Bellocchio as Lieutenant Bruni
- Nazzareno Bomba as Giovanni Cervo
- Emilian Cerniceanu as Matei
- Francesca Schiavo as Countess Gotha-Varano
- Giovanni Visentin as Prince Gotha-Varano
- Ruby Kammer as Rita
- Ferdinando Vales as Doc Enlil
- Daniele Bernardi as J.J. Enki
- Leon Kammer as Bill
- David Traylor as Danny
