= Natale a Rio =

2008 film directed by Neri Parenti

- Official poster
- Directed by: Neri Parenti
- Written by: Neri Parenti; Marco Martani; Alessandro Bencivenni; Domenico Saverni
- Produced by: Aurelio De Laurentiis; Luigi De Laurentiis
- Starring: Christian De Sica; Michelle Hunziker; Fabio De Luigi; Massimo Ghini; Paolo Conticini; Ludovico Fremont; Emanuele Propizio
- Edited by: Luca Montanari
- Music by: Allegra Rapoport
- Production company: Cinecittà
- Distributed by: Filmauro
- Release date: 2 December 2008
- Running time: 114 minutes
- Countries: Italy; Brazil
- Language: Italian
- Box office: $36,702,844

Natale a Rio (Christmas in Rio) is a 2008 Italian Christmas comedy film directed by Neri Parenti with Christian De Sica. It is the third film starring De Sica without mate Massimo Boldi, his shoulder of honor in these films that make up the saga of Italian "cinepanettoni". In fact, in 2006 they were separated in film roles following a dispute.

== Plot ==
Fabio Speranza (Fabio de Luigi) has always been in love with his colleague Linda Vita (Michelle Hunziker) but she has never noticed despite his efforts. The latter contact but due to a mistake she believes is her boyfriend (Paolo Conticini), thus creating a series of misunderstandings. Paolo Berni (Christian De Sica) and Mario Patani (Massimo Ghini), are two divorced, and they have organized a luxurious vacation in Rio de Janeiro for the Christmas holidays. They ignore, however, that their sons Piero (Ludovico Fremont) and Marco (Emanuele Propizio) have booked a trip for the same low-cost destination. For a problem of homonymy between fathers and sons, the two holidays are exchanged, however, so while their sons enjoy in luxurious villas, fathers end up into a comic wandering. Paolo and Mario understand that there was a mistake and try by every means to regain possession of their holiday.

== Cast ==
- Christian De Sica: Paolo Berni
- Michelle Hunziker: Linda Vita
- Fabio De Luigi: Fabio Speranza
- Massimo Ghini: Mario Patani
- Ludovico Fremont: Piero Berni
- Paolo Conticini: Gianni Corsi
- Emanuele Propizio: Marco Patani
- Paolo Ruffini: Holidays agent
- Neri Parenti: cameo
- Nanda Andrade: Padilha
- Raquel Vilar: Prepuzia
- Ronnie Marruda

== See also ==
- List of Christmas films
