= The Sweet Sounds of Life =

- Directed by: Giuseppe Bertolucci
- Written by: Lidia Ravera; Mimmo Rafele; Giuseppe Bertolucci
- Produced by: Massimo Ferrero
- Starring: Francesca Neri; Rade Šerbedžija
- Cinematography: Fabio Cianchetti
- Edited by: Federica Lang
- Music by: Bevano Est
- Distributed by: Medusa Film
- Release date: 1999
- Language: Italian

The Sweet Sounds of Life (Italian: Il dolce rumore della vita) is a 1999 Italian romance-drama film co-written and directed by Giuseppe Bertolucci. It premiered at the 56th Venice International Film Festival, and entered the competition at the 1999 Mar del Plata Film Festival, in which Bertolucci was awarded best director.

== Cast ==
- Francesca Neri as Sofia
- Rade Šerbedžija as Bruno Maier
- Niccolò Senni as Bruno at 15
- Rosalinda Celentano as Lolita
- Olimpia Carlisi as Prostitute
- Alida Valli as Grandmother of Sofia
