= I Cesaroni =

2006 Italian drama TV series

- Genre: Comedy-drama; Romantic comedy; Family drama; Teen drama
- Starring: Claudio Amendola; Elena Sofia Ricci; Antonello Fassari; Alessandra Mastronardi; Matteo Branciamore; Elda Alvigini; Ludovico Fremont; Niccolò Centioni; Micol Olivieri; Federico Russo; Max Tortora
- Country of origin: Italy
- Original language: Italian
- No. of seasons: 7
- No. of episodes: 142

Production
- Production company: Publispei

Original release
- Network: Canale 5
- Release: 7 September 2006 – present

I Cesaroni ("The Cesaronis") is an Italian television series, produced by Publispei for RTI, aired on Canale 5 from 2006 to 2014 and in 2026.

It is based on the format of the Spanish series Los Serrano.

== Plot ==
=== Season 1 ===
Professor Lucia Liguori, divorced and living in Milan, during a trip to Rome, accidentally meets Giulio Cesaroni, her boyfriend when they were kids and a widower for a few years. The passion between the two is rekindled and the decision to get married is almost immediate. Lucia moves to Rome in Giulio's single-family house together with her daughters from her first marriage, Eva and Alice. Thus begins the story of the Cesaronis, an extended family made up of seven members: the two parents, her two daughters and his three sons, Marco and Rudi (the same age as Eva and Alice respectively), and little Mimmo. There are also some other characters who interact assiduously with the inhabitants of the Cesaroni house: Gabriella Lanfranchi, Lucia's mother and a long-time resident of the "Garbatella" neighborhood; Cesare, Giulio's brother and his partner in the "Garbatella" wine shop; Ezio Masetti, an old friend of Giulio and Cesare and a regular customer of the wine shop; Stefania, Ezio's wife and Lucia's schoolmate; and finally Walter, Ezio and Stefania's son and Marco's best friend. Giulio and Lucia's marriage is put to the test several times, mainly by the terrible relationship created between their respective children. A further obstacle is Sergio Cudicini, Lucia's ex-husband, who interferes so that the woman and her daughters return to him, first by unsuccessfully threatening Giulio and his wife, then by staging a fake illness. The charade is discovered and the couple can finally get married.

Marco is in love with Eva from the start, but she already has a boyfriend who lives in Milan. The point of contact between the two stepbrothers is music, a sector in which Marco dreams of making a name for himself. Marco tries several times to declare his love to Eva but, failing, decides to confide in his father privately. Giulio is firmly against a possible relationship between the two, considering it morally inappropriate and potentially harmful to the family balance: he gets angry with his son, and urges him to date other people. The young man can't stop desiring Eva until he meets Rachele, a new teacher of his with whom he begins a love affair. Eva, after having considered Marco only as a good friend and brother for a long time, realizes that she is in love with him. Following the end of the relationship between Marco and Rachele, Eva would like to conquer Marco, but the only result is the moralistic sermons of Giulio who is adamant in wanting to keep the two young people apart.

Cesare meets Pamela, a prostitute hired to make friends and family believe that he is engaged. From this act, genuine feelings are born on the part of both, so much so that they go on vacation together. Rudi and Alice, during the time span of this season, constantly argue and declare their mutual disdain, but on rare occasions they behave like brothers.

Summer vacation time arrives and Giulio sends Marco and Eva to two different places. Through a series of coincidences, the two find themselves on the same ferry, ready to leave together. Giulio, as soon as he finds out, tells Lucia about the mutual love that has developed between their respective children. In agreement with his wife, who shares his moralistic positions, Giulio makes an anonymous phone call to the port authority in which he says that a bomb has been placed on the ferry.

=== Season 2 ===
Marco and Eva meet on the last day of vacation in the same hotel. The two have spent the summer apart, not because of Giulio's anonymous phone call, but because of Rachele's reappearance and an apparent reconciliation between the teacher and the student. However, Marco decides once and for all to leave Rachele and declares his love for Eva, who reciprocates. Their relationship is kept hidden from the family members, for fear of Giulio and Lucia's moralism. However, the kids are discovered when their respective parents find them naked and embracing in their bed. Giulio suffers a heart attack. Marco runs away from home and takes refuge in London. Eva joins Marco in England, but learns that her stepbrother went there on his own initiative, and not because his family forced him to. Feeling betrayed and abandoned, the young woman returns home alone and is determined to turn the page once and for all. The girl becomes infatuated with Alex, an emerging chef. Then Marco returns to Rome, belatedly convinced not to let himself be influenced by his family's moralism. Eva, after a furious reaction against her revived stepbrother, feels confused and is undecided between the two men she loves. Eva chooses the young Cesaroni and breaks up with Alex, but the situation turns upside down, and it is Marco who verbally attacks her, feeling betrayed. Days of clashes and teasing between the stepbrothers follow, but just when Marco wants to declare his love for Eva, she resumes her relationship with Alex. Marco realizes he made a mistake and accepts the story between Alex and his stepsister.

Alice and Rudi are in eighth grade. The young girl develops a crush on Umberto at the beginning of the season, but Rudi's pranks put her in a bad light. Alice's feelings are not reciprocated, since Umberto exploits her to see his sister Eva or asks her to babysit his little brother when he goes out with other girls.

The Barilon's have moved from Padua, becoming the Cesaroni's neighbors. Antonio Barilon, the head of the family, runs a bathroom fixtures shop near the liquor store, and initially does not win the sympathy of Giulio and Cesare, but the relationship is always quite cordial. His wife Germana, on the other hand, is a real antagonist and often acts inappropriately towards the neighbors. Lorenzo, Antonio and Germana's son, initially torments Rudi but then becomes his friend. Pamela asks Cesare to explain his running away during the holidays. He replies that he no longer loves her but secretly confesses to his friends that he was actually ashamed to tell her that he was a virgin.

A girl named Carlotta, who is repeating a year, arrives at school and immediately becomes a great friend of Eva. Walter and Carlotta begin a relationship.

The final exams are approaching and the boys must think about their future. Marco tries to make it in music and Eva wants to move with Alex to New York to attend Columbia University. The two pass the exams, just like Walter and Carlotta. During the end-of-year celebrations, Marco finds the acceptance letter to the Academy he had applied to hanging on the door of his room. Eva opens the envelope and reveals that Marco has been accepted. Transported by happiness, the two kiss and make love. Once downstairs, Marco overhears a conversation between Eva and Alex and understands that now it is up to her to choose between the two.

== Episodes ==
Season	Episodes	Originally released	
Season	Episodes	First released	Last released
1	26	September 7, 2006	November 12, 2006
2	26	February 1, 2008	May 8, 2008
3	29	February 6, 2009	May 25, 2009
4	20	September 9, 2010	December 21, 2010
5	29	September 14, 2012	December 14, 2012
6	12	September 3, 2014	November 19, 2014

=== Season 1 (2006) ===
No.	Title	Directed by	Original release date
1	"Promised newlyweds" (Italian: Promessi sposi)	Francesco Vicario	7 September 2006
2	"I can't see clearly" (Italian: Non ci vedo chiaro)	Francesco Vicario	7 September 2006
3	"The wedding of the century" (Italian: Il matrimonio del secolo)	Francesco Vicario	14 September 2006
4	"127 rustica" (Italian: 127 rustica)	Francesco Vicario	14 September 2006
5	"The perfect dad" (Italian: Il padre perfetto)	Francesco Vicario	15 September 2006
6	"The handcuffs of love" (Italian: Le manette dell'amore)	Francesco Vicario	15 September 2006
7	"Try again Cesare" (Italian: Provaci ancora Cesare)	Francesco Vicario	21 September 2006
8	"It's not the jealousy" (Italian: Non è la gelosia)	Francesco Vicario	21 September 2006
9	"The gifted one" (Italian: Il superdotato)	Francesco Vicario	28 September 2006
10	"All men at the President" (Italian: Tutti gli uomini dal presidente)	Francesco Vicario	28 September 2006
11	"Marta" (Italian: Marta)	Francesco Vicario	29 September 2006
12	"Jokes aside" (Italian: Scherzi a parte)	Francesco Vicario	29 September 2006
13	"The fight of the Masetti" (Italian: La guerra dei Masetti)	Francesco Vicario	5 October 2006
14	"Arrivals and departures" (Italian: Arrivi e partenze)	Francesco Vicario	5 October 2006
15	"The uncle of America" (Italian: Lo zio d'America)	Francesco Vicario	8 October 2006
16	"Seduced and abandoned" (Italian: Sedotta e abbandonata)	Francesco Vicario	8 October 2006
17	"In the shadow of the Colosseum" (Italian: All'ombra del Colosseo)	Francesco Vicario	15 October 2006
18	"The appearance deceiving" (Italian: L'apparenza inganna)	Francesco Vicario	15 October 2006
19	"Spring" (Italian: Primavera)	Francesco Vicario	22 October 2006
20	"Houston, we have a problem" (Italian: Houston, abbiamo un problema)	Francesco Vicario	22 October 2006
21	"Instructions for use" (Italian: Istruzioni per l'uso)	Francesco Vicario	29 October 2006
22	"Bad influences" (Italian: Cattive influenze)	Francesco Vicario	29 October 2006
23	"The last chance" (Italian: L'ultima occasione)	Francesco Vicario	5 November 2006
24	"School of cleaning" (Italian: Scuola di pulizia)	Francesco Vicario	5 November 2006
25	"Derby of the heart" (Italian: Derby del cuore)	Francesco Vicario	12 November 2006
26	"A sea of troubles" (Italian: Un mare di guai)	Francesco Vicario	12 November 2006

=== Season 2 (2008) ===
No.	Title	Directed by	Original release date
1	"If the bomb not explode" (Italian: Se la bomba non scoppia)	Francesco Vicario	1 February 2008
2	"Innkeeper ascendant virgin" (Italian: Oste ascendente vergine)	Francesco Vicario	1 February 2008
3	"Neighbors, too close" (Italian: Vicini, troppo vicini)	Francesco Vicario	8 February 2008
4	"It would take a friend" (Italian: Ci vorrebbe un amico)	Francesco Vicario	8 February 2008
5	"Dream of a morning of half autumn" (Italian: Sogno di un mattino di mezz'autunno)	Francesco Vicario	15 February 2008
6	"Three days like dogs" (Italian: Tre giorni da cani)	Francesco Vicario	15 February 2008
7	"Try again, Ezio" (Italian: Provaci ancora, Ezio)	Francesco Vicario	22 February 2008
8	"Do you want to dance with me?" (Italian: Vuoi ballare con me?)	Francesco Vicario	22 February 2008
9	"A weekend to be framed" (Italian: Un week-end da incorniciare)	Francesco Vicario	29 February 2008
10	"The mail of the heart" (Italian: La posta del cuore)	Francesco Vicario	29 February 2008
11	"The heart of the problem" (Italian: Il cuore del problema)	Francesco Vicario	7 March 2008
12	"To London with love" (Italian: A Londra con amore)	Francesco Vicario	7 March 2008
13	"The english key" (Italian: La chiave inglese)	Francesco Vicario	14 March 2008
14	"Out game" (Italian: Fuori gioco)	Francesco Vicario	14 March 2008
15	"The grass I want" (Italian: L'erba voglio)	Francesco Vicario	21 March 2008
16	"Love that come, love that go" (Italian: Amore che vieni, amore che vai)	Francesco Vicario	21 March 2008
17	"That ugly affair" (Italian: Che brutto affare)	Francesco Vicario	28 March 2008
18	"The imaginary friend" (Italian: L'amico immaginario)	Francesco Vicario	28 March 2008
19	"Dream or are Giulio" (Italian: Sogno o son Giulio)	Francesco Vicario	4 April 2008
20	"We begin again" (Italian: Ricominciamo)	Francesco Vicario	4 April 2008
21	"The secrets are as the cereal in the milk" (Italian: I segreti sono come i cereali nel latte)	Francesco Vicario	17 April 2008
22	"Playback" (Italian: Playback)	Francesco Vicario	18 April 2008
23	"But it's hard to climb" (Italian: Ma quant'è dura la salita)	Francesco Vicario	24 April 2008
24	"All for one" (Italian: Tutti per uno)	Francesco Vicario	1 May 2008
25	"Grow, that effort!" (Italian: Crescere, che fatica!)	Francesco Vicario	4 May 2008
26	"Maturity exam" (Italian: Prova di maturità)	Francesco Vicario	8 May 2008

=== Season 3 (2009) ===
No.	Title	Directed by	Original release date
1	"Fight without the neighborhood" (Italian: Lotta senza il quartiere)	Stefano Vicario	6 February 2009
2	"Garbatella 9' caliber" (Italian: Garbatella calibro 9)	Stefano Vicario	13 February 2009
3	"Porchetta and porcelain" (Italian: Porchetta e porcellana)	Stefano Vicario	13 February 2009
4	"The hidden truths" (Italian: Le verità nascoste)	Stefano Vicario	20 February 2009
5	"Garbatelleros" (Italian: I Garbatelleros)	Stefano Vicario	20 February 2009
6	"Heads up" (Italian: Su la testa)	Stefano Vicario	27 February 2009
7	"The seeds of friendship" (Italian: Il seme dell'amicizia)	Stefano Vicario	27 February 2009
8	"Pilot-fish" (Italian: Il pesce pilota)	Stefano Vicario	6 March 2009
9	"Mutual aid" (Italian: Mutuo soccorso)	Francesco Pavolini	6 March 2009
10	"I challenge therefore I am" (Italian: Sfido dunque sono)	Francesco Pavolini	13 March 2009
11	"Choice of field" (Italian: Scelta di campo)	Francesco Pavolini	13 March 2009
12	"Are we men, or gnomes?" (Italian: Siamo uomini, o gnomi?)	Francesco Pavolini	20 March 2009
13	"Russian roulette" (Italian: Roulette russa)	Francesco Pavolini	20 March 2009
14	"It was my mother" (Italian: Era mia madre)	Francesco Pavolini	27 March 2009
15	"Sometimes they return" (Italian: A volte ritornano)	Francesco Pavolini	27 March 2009
16	"Damage and women" (Italian: Danni e donne)	Francesco Pavolini	3 April 2009
17	"Just believe" (Italian: Basta crederci)	Francesco Pavolini	3 April 2009
18	"I married Eros" (Italian: Ho sposato Eros)	Francesco Pavolini	10 April 2009
19	"Transfer campaign" (Italian: Campagna acquisti)	Francesco Pavolini	17 April 2009
20	"Lullaby grandparents" (Italian: Ninnananna nonni)	Francesco Pavolini	17 April 2009
21	"Dear mothers" (Italian: Care mamme)	Francesco Pavolini	24 April 2009
22	"I don't have the age" (Italian: Non ho l'età)	Francesco Pavolini	4 May 2009
23	"I love you, I don't too" (Italian: Ti amo, neanch'io)	Francesco Pavolini	4 May 2009
24	"Master father" (Italian: Padre padrone)	Francesco Pavolini	11 May 2009
25	"Still you" (Italian: Ancora tu)	Francesco Pavolini	11 May 2009
26	"Elective diversities" (Italian: Diversità elettive)	Francesco Pavolini	18 May 2009
27	"Family photos" (Italian: Foto di famiglia)	Francesco Pavolini	18 May 2009
28	"You and me forever" (Italian: Io e te per sempre)	Francesco Pavolini	25 May 2009
29	"Wherever you go" (Italian: Ovunque andrai)	Francesco Pavolini	25 May 2009

=== Season 4 (2010) ===
No.	Title	Directed by	Original release date
1	"Serenely variable" (Italian: Serenissima variabile)	Stefano Vicario	9 September 2010
2	"Sitting bull" (Italian: Toro seduto)	Stefano Vicario	16 September 2010
3	"Sad girl" (Italian: Ragazza triste)	Stefano Vicario	17 September 2010
4	"Guaranteed success" (Italian: Successo assicurato)	Stefano Vicario	17 September 2010
5	"Watchful eye" (Italian: Occhio vigile)	Stefano Vicario	23 September 2010
6	"The shirkers" (Italian: Gli imboscati)	Stefano Vicario	30 September 2010
7	"Two friends to let" (Italian: Due amici in affitto)	Stefano Vicario	4 October 2010
8	"Wonderful thought" (Italian: Pensiero stupendo)	Francesco Pavolini	11 October 2010
9	"Spring-cleaning" (Italian: Pulizie di primavera)	Francesco Pavolini	19 October 2010
10	"Don't bail out on me" (Italian: Non darmi buca)	Francesco Pavolini	26 October 2010
11	"Universal prejudice" (Italian: Pregiudizio universale)	Francesco Pavolini	2 November 2010
12	"Bad company" (Italian: Cattive compagnie)	Francesco Pavolini	9 November 2010
13	"Marta's smile" (Italian: Il sorriso di Marta)	Francesco Pavolini	16 November 2010
14	"Sadomasetti" (Italian: Sadomasetti)	Francesco Pavolini	23 November 2010
15	"Sim sala sbam!" (Italian: Sim sala sbam!)	Stefano Vicario	30 November 2010
16	"Germana zero year" (Italian: Germana anno zero)	Stefano Vicario	7 December 2010
17	"In the Ball" (Italian: Nel pallone)	Stefano Vicario	10 December 2010
18	"Guilty for a night" (Italian: Rei per una notte)	Stefano Vicario	14 December 2010
19	"Argentine beef" (Italian: Manzo argentino)	Stefano Vicario	17 December 2010
20	"Milestones" (Italian: Traguardi)	Stefano Vicario	21 December 2010

=== Season 5 (2012) ===
No.	Title	Directed by	Original release date
1	"The art of loving" (Italian: L'arte di amare)	Francesco Vicario	14 September 2012
2	"At crazy speed" (Italian: A folle velocità)	Francesco Vicario	14 September 2012
3	"Glow in the sky" (Italian: Bagliore nel cielo)	Francesco Vicario	21 September 2012
4	"The eternal youth" (Italian: L'eterna giovinezza)	Francesco Vicario	21 September 2012
5	"A bookmark in the heart" (Italian: Un segnalibro nel cuore)	Francesco Vicario	28 September 2012
6	"Real father" (Italian: Padre vero)	Francesco Vicario	28 September 2012
7	"Far from prejudice" (Italian: Lontano dai pregiudizi)	Francesco Vicario	5 October 2012
8	"You, divine music" (Italian: Tu musica divina)	Francesco Pavolini	12 October 2012
9	"Kidnapped by love" (Italian: Dall'amor rapito)	Francesco Pavolini	12 October 2012
10	"Genius between the pages" (Italian: Genio tra le pagine)	Francesco Pavolini	19 October 2012
11	"Miraculously" (Italian: Miracolosamente)	Francesco Pavolini	19 October 2012
12	"Ever to the mat" (Italian: Mai al tappeto)	Francesco Pavolini	21 October 2012
13	"One step at a time" (Italian: Un passo alla volta)	Francesco Pavolini	21 October 2012
14	"Roundtrip in Milan" (Italian: Milano andata e ritorno)	Francesco Pavolini	28 October 2012
15	"With closed eyes" (Italian: Ad occhi chiusi)	Francesco Vicario	2 November 2012
16	"Against everything and everyone" (Italian: Contro tutto e tutti)	Francesco Vicario	2 November 2012
17	"From west to east" (Italian: Da occidente a oriente)	Francesco Vicario	9 November 2012
18	"Without half-measures" (Italian: Senza mezze misure)	Francesco Vicario	9 November 2012
19	"Dreaming the reality" (Italian: Sognando la realtà)	Francesco Vicario	16 November 2012
20	"With noble principles" (Italian: Con nobili principi)	Francesco Vicario	16 November 2012
21	"In search of the past time" (Italian: Alla ricerca del tempo passato)	Francesco Vicario	26 October 2012
22	"Betting" (Italian: Scommesse)	Francesco Pavolini	23 November 2012
23	"Old legends" (Italian: Vecchie leggende)	Francesco Pavolini	23 November 2012
24	"The perfect prescription" (Italian: La ricetta perfetta)	Francesco Pavolini	30 November 2012
25	"Needless to hide" (Italian: Inutile nascondersi)	Francesco Pavolini	30 November 2012
26	"We are all so" (Italian: Siamo tutti così)	Francesco Pavolini	7 December 2012
27	"Same and different" (Italian: Uguali e diversi)	Francesco Pavolini	7 December 2012
28	"A true drama" (Italian: Un vero dramma)	Francesco Pavolini	14 December 2012
29	"There are people that don't make them more" (Italian: Ci sono della gente che non li fanno più)	Francesco Pavolini	14 December 2012

=== Season 6 (2014) ===
No.	Title	Directed by	Original release date
1	"Giulio and his brothers" (Italian: Giulio e i suoi fratelli)	Francesco Pavolini	3 September 2014
2	"Two hearts and a hope" (Italian: Due cuori e una speranza)	Francesco Pavolini	10 September 2014
3	"Fear and loathing at the Garbatella" (Italian: Paura e delirio alla Garbatella)	Francesco Pavolini	16 September 2014
4	"Sex, lies and webseries" (Italian: Sesso, bugie e webseries)	Francesco Pavolini	23 September 2014
5	"The room of the daughter" (Italian: La stanza della figlia)	Francesco Pavolini	28 September 2014
6	"Low betrayal" (Italian: Basso tradimento)	Francesco Pavolini	5 October 2014
7	"The good and the illness" (Italian: Il bene e il malore)	Francesco Pavolini	12 October 2014
8	"For a fistful of Mimmo" (Italian: Per un pugno di Mimmo)	Francesco Pavolini	19 October 2014
9	"The boys of the lake" (Italian: I ragazzi del lago)	Francesco Pavolini	26 October 2014
10	"There was a son in America" (Italian: C'era un figlio in America)	Francesco Pavolini	9 November 2014
11	"The best day of his life" (Italian: Il più bel giorno della sua vita)	Francesco Pavolini	12 November 2014
12	"I love you too much to (not) tell you" (Italian: Ti amo troppo per (non) dirtelo)	Francesco Pavolini	19 November 2014

== Awards ==
In 2007, I Cesaroni won the Telegatto as Best TV Series.

On 29 March 2008, I Cesaroni won the RAI Oscar della TV as "Best TV Series of the Year 2007/2008".

On 30 November 2008, the show won the Nickelodeon Kids' Choice Awards as Best TV Series.

On 11 July 2009, at the Rome Fiction Fest, the readers of the popular magazine TV Sorrisi e Canzoni awarded I Cesaroni as Best TV Series and Alessandra Mastronardi as Best Actor.

== Film ==
After the great success of the TV show, in 2008 the idea of making a movie out of it came up for the first time. In this movie the main characters would have been Alessandra Mastronardi and Matteo Branciamore, the "young ones" of the show. The plan was to separate the general plot of the movie from the plot of the TV show, even if the characters remain the same.

The event "Day of I Cesaroni" took place at the movies in Italy on 15 May 2008; it consisted of a special piece of 85 minutes about Marcos and Eva in 12 Italian movie theatres. The event served as a preview of the interest the audience had in a future longer movie.

== See also ==
- List of Italian television series
