= Days of Nothing =

2007 studio album by The Foreshadowing

Studio album by the Foreshadowing
- Released: 22 October 2007
- Genres: Gothic rock, gothic metal, doom metal
- Length: 52:25
- Label: Candlelight
- Producer: Giuseppe Orlando

The Foreshadowing chronology
| Days of Nothing (2007) | Oionos (2010) |

Professional ratings
Review scores
| Source | Rating |
|---|---|
| About.com | 4/5 |
| AllMusic | 3.5/5 |
| Heavymetal.dk | 4/10 |
| Metal Reviews | 80/100 |
| Metal.de | 9/10 |
| Metal1.info | 9.5/10 |

Days of Nothing is the debut studio album by Italian gothic doom metal band the Foreshadowing, released on 22 October 2007 by Candlelight Records. It was recorded with the original lineup of Marco Benevento on vocals, Alessandro Pace and Andrea Chiodetti on guitars, Francesco Sosto on keyboards and backing vocals, Davide Pesola on bass and Jonah Padella on drums.

== Track listing ==
1. Cold Waste – 6:23
2. The Wandering – 4:40
3. Death Is Our Freedom – 5:20
4. Departure – 4:08
5. Eschaton – 6:44
6. Last Minute Train – 4:10
7. Ladykiller – 4:28
8. The Fall – 6:16
9. Days of Nothing – 6:32
10. Into the Lips of the Earth – 3:44

== Personnel ==
- Marco Benevento – lead vocals
- Alessandro Pace – guitars
- Andrea Chiodetti – guitars
- Francesco Sosto – keyboards, backing vocals
- Davide Pesola – bass
- Jonah Padella – drums

== Reception ==
Review scores ranged from 4/10 at Heavymetal.dk to 9.5/10 at Metal1.info.

Alex Henderson of AllMusic wrote that Benevento's performances are "absolutely dripping with sadness, sorrow, pessimism, and despair".

Stephan of Metal.de called the album an "overwhelming debut" and "another candidate for one of the ten best albums of 2007".

Heavymetal.dk was less impressed, writing that "variation is apparently a foreign word for the band".
