= Cha cha cha (film) =

2013 film by Marco Risi

- Directed by: Marco Risi
- Written by: Marco Risi; Andrea Purgatori; Jim Carrington
- Starring: Luca Argentero; Eva Herzigová; Claudio Amendola; Pippo Delbono
- Cinematography: Marco Onorato
- Edited by: Clelio Benevento
- Music by: Marco I. Benevento
- Release date: 2013
- Running time: 95 minutes
- Language: Italian

Cha cha cha is a 2013 Italian crime-thriller film directed by Marco Risi. Loosely inspired by the works of Raymond Chandler, it premiered at the 2013 Taormina Film Fest.

== Cast ==
- Luca Argentero: Corso
- Eva Herzigová: Michelle
- Claudio Amendola: Torre
- Pippo Delbono: Lawyer Argento
- Bebo Storti: Massa
- Marco Leonardi: Photographer
- Pietro Ragusa: Muschio
- Shel Shapiro: Himself
- Nino Frassica

== Production and distribution ==
The movie was produced by BiBi Film, Babe Films and Rai Cinema. The post-production was carried out by Reset VFX S.r.l. The distribution of the movie is by 01 Distribution.
