= Torno indietro e cambio vita =

Italian movie

- Film poster
- Directed by: Carlo Vanzina
- Written by: Carlo Vanzina; Enrico Vanzina
- Starring: Raoul Bova; Giulia Michelini; Ricky Memphis; Max Tortora; Paola Minaccioni
- Cinematography: Tani Canevari
- Edited by: Luca Montanari
- Music by: Giuliano Taviani; Carmelo Travia
- Release date: 18 June 2015
- Running time: 90 minutes
- Country: Italy
- Language: Italian

Torno indietro e cambio vita (lit. 'I go back and change my life') is a 2015 Italian comedy film directed by Carlo Vanzina.

The film is a loose remake of the French film Bis, released previously the same year.

== Cast ==
- Raoul Bova as Marco Damiani
- Giulia Michelini as Giulia Borghini
- Ricky Memphis as Claudio Palmerini
- Max Tortora as Aldo Damiani
- Paola Minaccioni as Giuditta Palmerini
- Michela Andreozzi as Patrizia Damiani
- Emanuele Propizio as Gilberto Damiani
- Augusto Fornari as Lando Santini
- Stefano Masciarelli as Leopoldo, Giulia's father
- Fiorenza Tessari as Franca, Giulia's mother
- Erika Di Rienzo as Titti, Giulia's sister
- Carlotta Badiali as Benny
- Ludovica Bizzaglia as Betta
- Alice Bellagamba as Daniela
- Maria Pia Timo as Lalla
- Carlo De Ruggieri as Giorgio Mariotti
- Fabiano Cutigni as Sandro Garbarino
- David Sebasti as adult Garbarino
- Donatella Pompadour as Marco's ex wife
- Mauro Serio as the physician
