= Max Tortora =

Italian actor (born 1963)

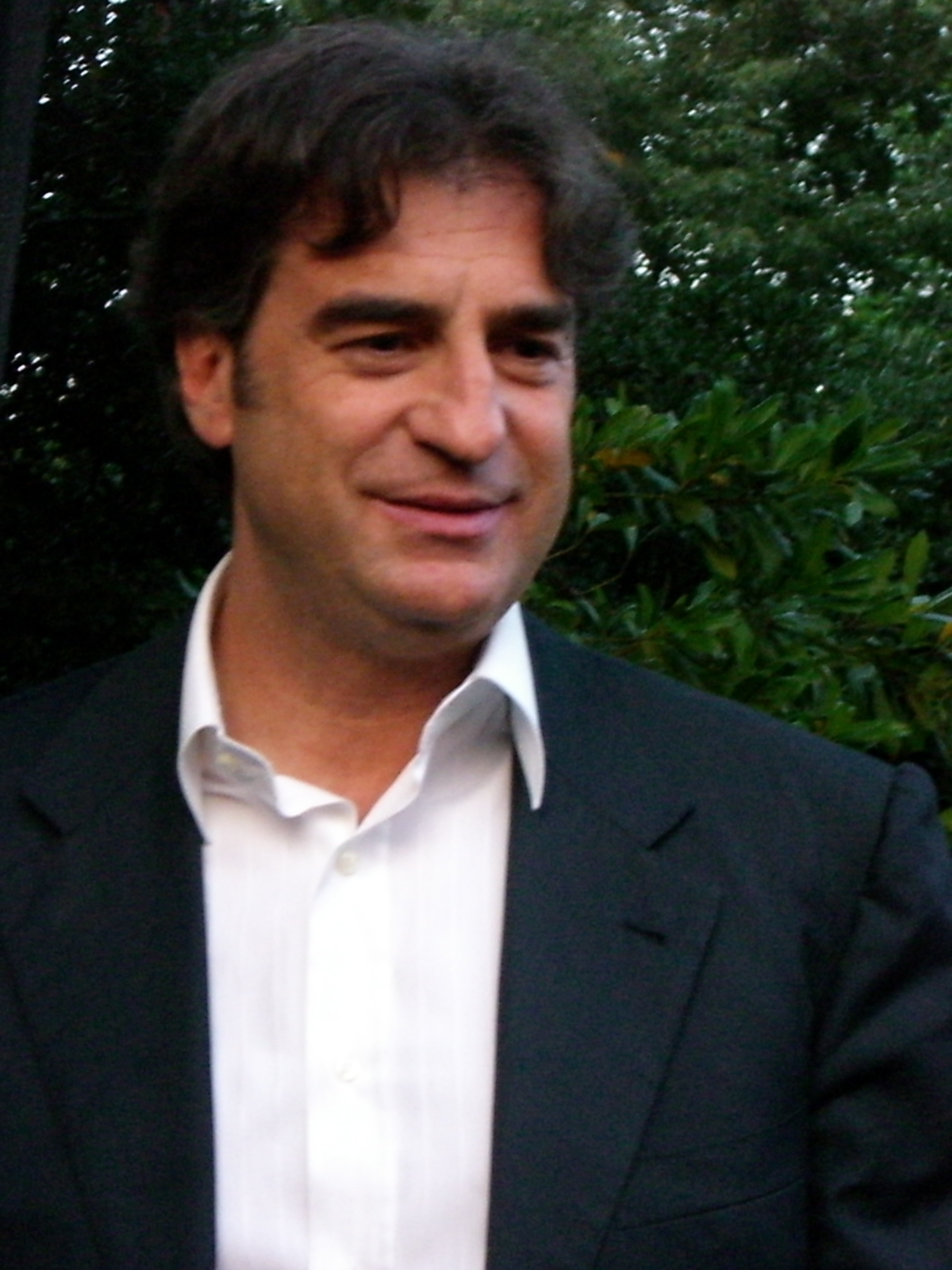
- Max Tortora in 2008
- Born: Massimiliano Tortora; 21 January 1963 (age 63); Rome, Italy
- Occupations: Actor; comedian; impressionist
- Years active: 1984–present

Massimiliano "Max" Tortora (born 21 January 1963) is an Italian actor, comedian and impressionist.

== Biography ==
Very active on TV, Tortora began his career on stage in the 1980s, after graduating in architecture. His most famous role is the role of the mechanic Ezio in the TV series I Cesaroni, from 2006 to 2014, and the co-pilot Max in Piloti. He also took part to several cinepanettoni by Carlo Vanzina.

On TV he alternates the roles of comedian, presenter and impressionist, giving impressions of characters like Alberto Sordi, Luciano Rispoli, Adriano Celentano, Franco Califano and Michele Santoro.

In 2018 Tortora takes part to the film On My Skin, based on the last days of Stefano Cucchi, playing the role of Cucchi's father, Giovanni. The film is presented at the 75th Venice Film Festival.

== Filmography ==
=== Films ===
Year	Title	Role(s)	Notes
2001	Stregati dalla luna	Barbero	
2005	The Clan	Bob / Otello / Pedro	
2006	Una settimana di risate	Various roles	
2010	Parents and Children: Shake Well Before Using	Mario	
2010	Natale in Sudafrica	Giorgio Boffa	
2014	Postman Pat: The Movie	Postman Pat	Italian dub; voice role
2014	A Fairy-Tale Wedding	Nando Croce	
2015	Torno indietro e cambio vita	Aldo Damiani	
2016	La coppia dei campioni	Remo "Zotta" Ricci	
2016	Miami Beach	Giovanni	
2017	Caccia al tesoro	Cesare	
2018	Boys Cry	Danilo	
2018	Loro	Martino	
2018	On My Skin	Giovanni Cucchi	
2019	Brave ragazze	Donato Marini	
2019	C'è tempo	Policeman	Cameo appearance
2020	Bad Tales	Narrating voice	
2020	Il regno	Bartolomeo Sanna	
2021	Si vive una volta sola	Corrado Pezzella	
2022	Dry	Alberto Jacolucci	
2023	The Best Days	Bruno Amenta	
2023	Needing a Friend?	Alberto	
2023	Felicità	Max Mazzoni	

=== Television ===
Year	Title	Role(s)	Notes
1999	Villa Ada	Bonucci	Television movie
2001–2002	Quelli che... il Calcio	Himself / Various	Variety show
2003	Cocktail d'amore	Himself / Co-host	Variety show (season 2)
2003–2004	Che tempo che fa	Himself / Co-host	Talk show (season 1)
2004	BravoGrazie	Himself / Host	Comedy special
2006–2012, 2026	I Cesaroni	Ezio Masetti	Main role (season 1-5, 7)
2007	7 vite	Armando	Episode: "Padre piacione"
2007–2009	Piloti	Max Conti	Lead role
2014	Impazienti	Alberto Principe	Lead role
2015	Castrocaro Music Festival	Himself / Judge	Music contest
2019–2020	Baby	Roberto DeSanctis	Main role (seasons 2-3)
2021	Tutta colpa di Freud	Matteo De Tommasi	Main role
2021–2023	Vita da Carlo	Himself (fictional version)	Main role (seasons 1-2)
2025	Sicily Express	The President	Main role
2026	Don Matteo	Biagio Martini	2 episodes
