= Claudio Amendola =

Italian actor, television presenter and director

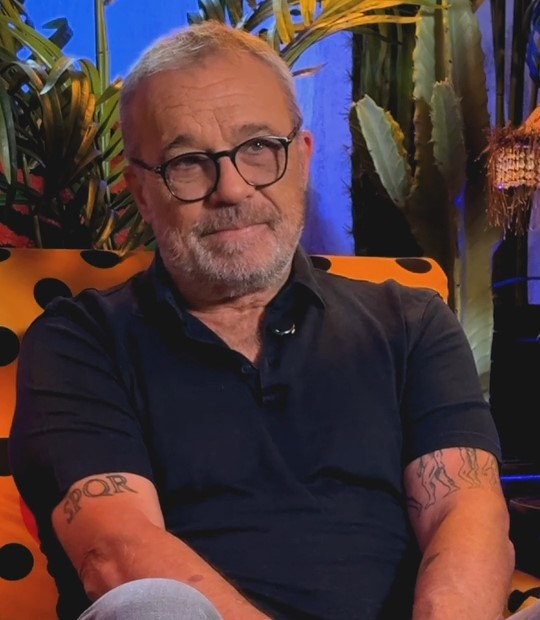
- Amendola in 2025
- Born: 16 February 1963 (age 63); Rome, Italy
- Occupations: Actor; film director; television presenter
- Years active: 1983–present
- Height: 1.74 m (5 ft 9 in)
- Spouses: Marina Grande (m. 1983; div. 1997) Francesca Neri (m. 2010; div. 2022)
- Children: 3, including Alessia Amendola
- Parents: Ferruccio Amendola (father); Rita Savagnone (mother)
- Relatives: Deddi Savagnone (aunt); Mario Amendola (great-uncle)

Claudio Amendola (born 16 February 1963) is an Italian actor, film director and television presenter. He starred in the 1993 film The Escort, which was entered into the 1993 Cannes Film Festival.

== Biography ==
Born in Rome and the son of actors and voice dubbers Ferruccio Amendola and Rita Savagnone, Amendola started his movie career during the 1980s, playing comic roles in some Italian comedies directed by Carlo Vanzina. In 1987 he played his first dramatic role in Soldati - 365 all'alba, directed by Marco Risi, and in the following decade he confirmed his dramatic skills in some movies such as Ultra (1990) and The Escort (1993), both directed by Ricky Tognazzi. During the 2000s Amendola became a very popular television actor, acting in the popular fiction I Cesaroni, the Italian version of Los Serrano.

In 2016, he was a judge on the first five seasons of the RAI programme Tale e quale show, the Italian adaptation of Your Face Sounds Familiar.

=== Personal life ===
Amendola was married to actress Francesca Neri from 2010 until 2022 and they have a son together, Rocco. He also has two daughters from a previous marriage. One of them is voice actress Alessia Amendola.

== Filmography ==
=== Films ===
Year	Title	Role(s)	Notes
1983	Lontano da dove	Mario	
1983	Vacanze di Natale	Mario Marchetti	
1984	Amarsi un po'	Marco Coccia	
1984	Vacanze in America	Alessio Liberatore	
1985	The Venetian Woman	Bernardo	
1987	Soldati - 365 all'alba	Claudio Scanna	
1988	Days of Inspector Ambrosio	Luciano	
1989	Forever Mary	Pietro Giancona	
1990	Captain Fracassa's Journey	Agostino	
1991	Ultra	Principe	
1992	Un'altra vita	Mauro	
1993	The Escort	Angelo Mandolesi	
1993	Briganti - Amore e libertà	Giovanni	
1994	The Heroes	Fabio	
1994	La Reine Margot	Annibal de Coconas	
1995	Policemen	Lorenzo Ferri	
1995	Who Killed Pasolini?	'Trepalle'	
1995	The Horseman on the Roof	Paolo Maggionari	
1996	My Generation	Claudio Braccio	
1997	Lady and the Tramp	Tramp (voice)	Italian voice-over
1997	Un paradiso di bugie	Sergio	
1997	An Eyewitness Account	Sandro Nardella	
1997	The Grey Zone	Dario Campisi	
1997	Other Men	Michele Croce	
1997	Santo Stefano	Bruno D'Assisi	
1998	Mare largo	Edoardo	
2000	La Carbonara	Lupone	
2000	Il grande botto	Antonio Nunziante	
2000	Johnny the Partisan	Piero Balbo	
2001	Domenica	Inspector Sciarra	
2001	Sottovento	Paolo	
2003	Caterina in the Big City	Manlio Germano	
2003	Ho visto le stelle	Renato / Claudio	
2003	Senza freni	Uncle Claudio	Unreleased
2005	Il ritorno del Monnezza	Rocky Giraldi	Also writer
2005	Melissa P.	None	Producer
2010	La fisica dell'acqua	Claudio	
2011	Bar Sport	Client	Cameo appearance
2013	Cha cha cha	Torre	
2014	The Move of the Penguin	None	Director and writer
2015	The Legendary Giulia and Other Miracles	Sergio	
2015	Suburra	Samurai	
2017	Il permesso - 48 ore fuori	Luigi	Also director and writer
2017	Like a Cat on a Highway	Sergio	
2017	Pino Daniele: Il tempo resterà	Himself	Documentary
2018	Hotel Gagarin	Elio Beato	
2018	Show Dogs	Deepak (voice)	Italian voice-over
2020	Abbi fede	Adamo	
2021	Like a Cat on a Highway 2	Sergio	
2022	I cassamortari	None	Director and writer
2025	Fuori la verità	Edoardo	

=== Television ===
Year	Title	Role(s)	Notes
1982	Storia d'amore e d'amicizia	Davide	Miniseries
1984	Quei trentasei gradini	Pino	Miniseries
1987	L'ombra nera del Vesuvio	Nini Sposito	Miniseries
1987	Professione vacanze	Antonio Palombelli	Episode: "A qualcuno piace il calcio"
1987	Little Roma	Augusto	Main role
1990	Il colore della vittoria	Attilio Ferraris	Miniseries
1991–1992	Pronto soccorso	Augusto	Main role
1991–1993	Felipe ha gli occhi azzurri	Antonio Stasi	Main role
1996	Nostromo	Nostromo	Miniseries
1999	Squadra mobile scomparsi	Inspector Spada	Recurring role; 5 episodes
1999	Jesus	Barabbas	Television film
2000	L'impero	Dario Ferri	Miniseries
2001	L'attentatuni - Il grande attentato	Cardine	Miniseries
2002	Napoléon	Joachim Murat	Miniseries
2003	Inferno Below	Antonino	Miniseries
2005	La caccia	Pietro Sacco	Miniseries
2005	Cefalonia	Mikis	Television film
2006	48 ore	Diego Montagna	Lead role
2006–2014; 2026	I Cesaroni	Giulio Cesaroni	Main role
2010	Tutti per Bruno	Inspector Bruno Miranda	Lead role
2011	Dov'è mia figlia?	Claudio Valle	Miniseries
2016	Lampedusa - Dall'orizzone in poi	Marco Serra	Miniseries
2018–2022	Carlo & Malik	Carlo Guerrieri	Lead role
2023–2024	Il patriarca	Nemesio Bandera	Lead role
