= Piloti (TV series) =

- Genre: Sitcom
- Directed by: Celeste Laudisio
- Starring: Enrico Bertolino; Max Tortora
- Country of origin: Italy
- No. of seasons: 3
- No. of episodes: 459

Production
- Producer: Rosario Rinaldo
- Running time: 5 mins
- Production company: Magnolia Fiction

Original release
- Network: Rai 2
- Release: April 5, 2007 – December 21, 2011

Piloti is an Italian sitcom, produced by Magnolia TV and aired on Rai 2 for three seasons starting in spring 2007 and ending in fall 2011.

== Format and situation ==
The programme consists of five-minute unedited "sketch-com" episodes, three of which were broadcast every evening, five days a week. The first season began on 5 April 2007 and ended on 27 September and included 150 episodes; the second season began on 15 November 2008 and ended on 10 August and included 216 episodes; the third season of 43 episodes began on 30 March 2011 and ended on 21 December. Among the three seasons, there are also about 100 unaired episodes.

The setting is a budget airline, Piccione Airlines, where Enrico Gasparini (Enrico Bertolino) and Max Conti (Max Tortora) are pilots; many episodes take place in a cockpit. Some characters, including the company head (Gianni Quillico) and Gasparini's wife (Carla Chiarelli) are unseen, heard on the crew's mobile phones or on aircraft communications.

Gasparini and Conti first explored the budget airline setting in a 2003 RAI comedy, Bulldozer.

== Cast ==
- Enrico Bertolino as Enrico Gasparini, pilot, with a Milanese accent, punctilious, with excellent English
- Max Tortora as Max Conti, copilot, with a Roman accent, sloppy, with little English
- Gisella Burinato as Silvana Bava, chief Flight attendant
- Jessica Polsky as Josephine Caratozzo, the other flight attendant, a beautiful Italian-American with her head in the clouds
- Giovanni Sanicola: Celeste, steward
- Gianni Quillico as the head of Piccione Airlines (unseen)
- Carla Chiarelli as Gasparini's wife (unseen)
- Enrica Ajò as Cecilia, Gasparini's daughter
- Filippo Spagliardi as Tommaso, Gasparini's son
- Sergio Friscia as Arturo, Caratozzo's boyfriend
- Teresa Piergentili as Adelina, Conti's mother

Pamela Prati guest starred in Series 3 as the wife of an important politician.

== Awards ==
Piloti won a 2008 Rose d'Or award in the sitcom category.

== See also ==
- List of Italian television series
