= My Generation (1996 film) =

- Film poster
- Directed by: Wilma Labate
- Written by: Wilma Labate; Paolo Lapponi; Andrea Leoni; Francesca Marciano; Sandro Petraglia
- Starring: Silvio Orlando; Claudio Amendola; Francesca Neri
- Cinematography: Alessandro Pesci
- Music by: Nicola Piovani
- Release date: 1996
- Language: Italian

My Generation (Italian: La mia generazione) is a 1996 Italian drama film written and directed by Wilma Labate.

The film won the Grolla d'oro for best film. It was also the Italian candidate in the race for Best Foreign Language Film at the 69th Academy Awards, but it was not nominated.

== Plot ==
1983. Braccio (Amendola), a political prisoner (he was a terrorist) is brought from Sicily to Milan by a captain of the Carabinieri (Orlando). He was often allowed to have conversation with his girlfriend. During the journey the captain shows himself kind, open, on his side. Arriving almost at destination the officer throws the mask. It was all a trick, the prisoner will have privileges, and perhaps soon freedom, if he speaks and denounces one of his fugitive comrades, probably murderer of a policeman. Braccio refuses and he's brought back to Sicily.

== Cast ==
- Claudio Amendola as Braccio
- Silvio Orlando as Captain
- Francesca Neri as Giulia
- Stefano Accorsi as Carabiniere Bonoli
- Anna Melato as Elena
- Vincenzo Peluso as Concilio
- Hossein Taheri as Carabiniere Caruso
- Arnaldo Ninchi as Penzo
- Paolo De Vita as Marshal S. Alba
- Alessandra Vanzi as Prostitute

== See also ==
- List of submissions to the 69th Academy Awards for Best Foreign Language Film
- List of Italian submissions for the Academy Award for Best Foreign Language Film
