= Varo Venturi =

Italian film director and musician (born 1956)

- Venturi in 1986
- Born: 9 August 1956 (age 69); Rome, Italy
- Occupations: Film director, writer, actor, musician, author, composer and researcher
- Years active: 1978–present
- Website: deusfilm.com

Varo Venturi-Clementini (born 9 August 1956, Rome, Italy) is an Italian film director and musician.

== Filmography ==
- 1998 – Don Giovanni
- 1997 – Cosmos Hotel
- 1999 – Sotto la luna
- 2000 – Controvento
- 2002 – L'italiano
- 2007 – Nazareno
- 2011 – 6 giorni sulla Terra (6 Days on Earth)
- 2013 – Realscienza (Documentary

Selected at the 33° Moscow International Film Festival
