= ...Beyond My Grey Wake =

Studio album by How Like a Winter
- Released: June 3, 2003
- Recorded: 2002, Temple of Noise Studio, Rome, Italy
- Genre: Gothic doom metal, death/doom
- Length: 59:28
- Label: Martyr Music Group
- Producer: Christian Ice and How Like a Winter

How Like a Winter chronology
The Winter's Near (2001)	...Beyond My Grey Wake

...Beyond My Grey wake is the debut studio album by the Italian gothic doom metal band How Like a Winter.

== Track listing ==
1. "A Flower That Sears in Silence" – 5:51
2. "All the Seasons of Madness" – 7:58
3. "Laying Together Again" – 6:52
4. "Bescreen'd" – 10:37
5. "Who is Hiding" (instrumental) – 2:20
6. "Crucifige" – 7:09
7. "XCVII" – 3:19
8. "The Night, Then Him" – 8:23
9. "So Death Would be Just a Bad Dream" (instrumental) – 7:01
- Music and arrangements by Dust, Mist and Bane. All lyrics written by Dust except track 7 written by William Shakespeare. The artwork on the album was created by Paul Kuhr of Novembers Doom.

== Personnel ==
- Dust − male vocals, piano, orchestra
- Agony − violins
- Tragedy − female vocals
- Misery − female vocals
- Bane − bass guitar
- Mist − classical, acoustic and electric guitars
