= Oionos =

Studio album by the Foreshadowing
- Released: 2 April 2010
- Recorded: 2009
- Studios: Outer Sound Studios, Rome
- Genres: Gothic rock, gothic metal, doom metal
- Length: 59:44
- Label: Metal Blade

The Foreshadowing chronology
Days of Nothing (2007)	Oionos (2010)	Second World (2012)

Professional ratings
Review scores
Source	Rating
Heavymetal.dk	5/10
Metal.de	9/10
Metal1.info	7/10
Metalfan.nl	86/100
Rockfreaks.net	4/10
Stormbringer	3.5/5

Oionos is the second studio album by Italian gothic doom metal band the Foreshadowing, released on 2 April 2010 by Metal Blade Records.

== Track listing ==
1. The Dawning – 6:44
2. Outsiders – 5:16
3. Oionos – 6:08
4. Fallen Reign – 5:41
5. Soliloquium – 2:29
6. Lost Humanity – 6:10
7. Survivors Sleep – 4:46
8. Chant of Widows – 7:28
9. Hope. She's in the Water – 5:38
10. Russians (Sting cover) – 5:47
11. Revelation 3:11 – 3:37

== Personnel ==
- Marco Benevento – lead vocals
- Alessandro Pace – guitars
- Andrea Chiodetti – guitars
- Francesco Sosto – keyboards, backing vocals
- Davide Pesola – bass
- Jonah Padella – drums

Production

- Mixed and recorded at Outer Sound Studios in Rome with Giuseppe Orlando
- Mastered by Mika Jussila

Cover art

- Design by Seth Siro Anton
