= How Like a Winter =

Italian gothic doom metal band

- How Like a Winter members (L-R):- Tragedy, Dust, Mist, Agony, Bane, Misery

Background information
- Origin: Campobasso, Italy
- Genres: Gothic metal Death/doom
- Years active: 1995 − present
- Labels: Martyr Music Group
- Members: Dust; Agony; Tragedy; Misery; Bane; Mist
- Website: www.howlikeawinter.it

How Like a Winter is a gothic doom metal band from Italy that was formed in the mid-1990s, although their first recording was not until much later. The band's music, which can be described as atmospheric and melancholy, is composed using violins, various classical, acoustic and electric guitars, and features male and female vocalists; the band members all use evocative pseudonyms. Male vocals are both clean and growled, whereas the female duo of Tragedy and Misery are invariably clean. Delicate violins mingle with heavy guitar riffs and are complemented by acoustic guitar solos. The band's music has been likened to that of Paradise Lost, Celestial Season, Novembers Doom, Shape of Despair, and My Dying Bride. Guitarist Mist lists My Dying Bride as a great inspiration, along with Opeth and Katatonia among others.

Their first recording was the 2001 demo-CD The Winter's Near. The band subsequently released their full-length album ...Beyond My Grey Wake in 2003. Both CDs were recorded at Temple of Noise studios, Rome, Italy. The release of their debut full-length album was met by very favourable reviews from magazines including Vampire Magazine, Digital Metal and Metal Edge. Martyr Music Group stated "Early in the year (2003) How Like a Winter's debut CD ...Beyond My Grey Wake comes out and the response was simply phenomenal".

== Etymology ==
The band's name is taken from the first line of William Shakespeare's sonnet XCVII:- "How like a winter hath my absence been".

== Members ==
- Dust − male vocals, piano, orchestra
- Agony − violins
- Tragedy − female vocals
- Misery − female vocals
- Bane − bass guitar
- Mist − classical, acoustic, electric guitars

== Discography ==
- The Winter's Near (Demo, 2001)
- ...Beyond My Grey Wake (CD, 2003)
