= Panhard AML =

Panhard AML-245
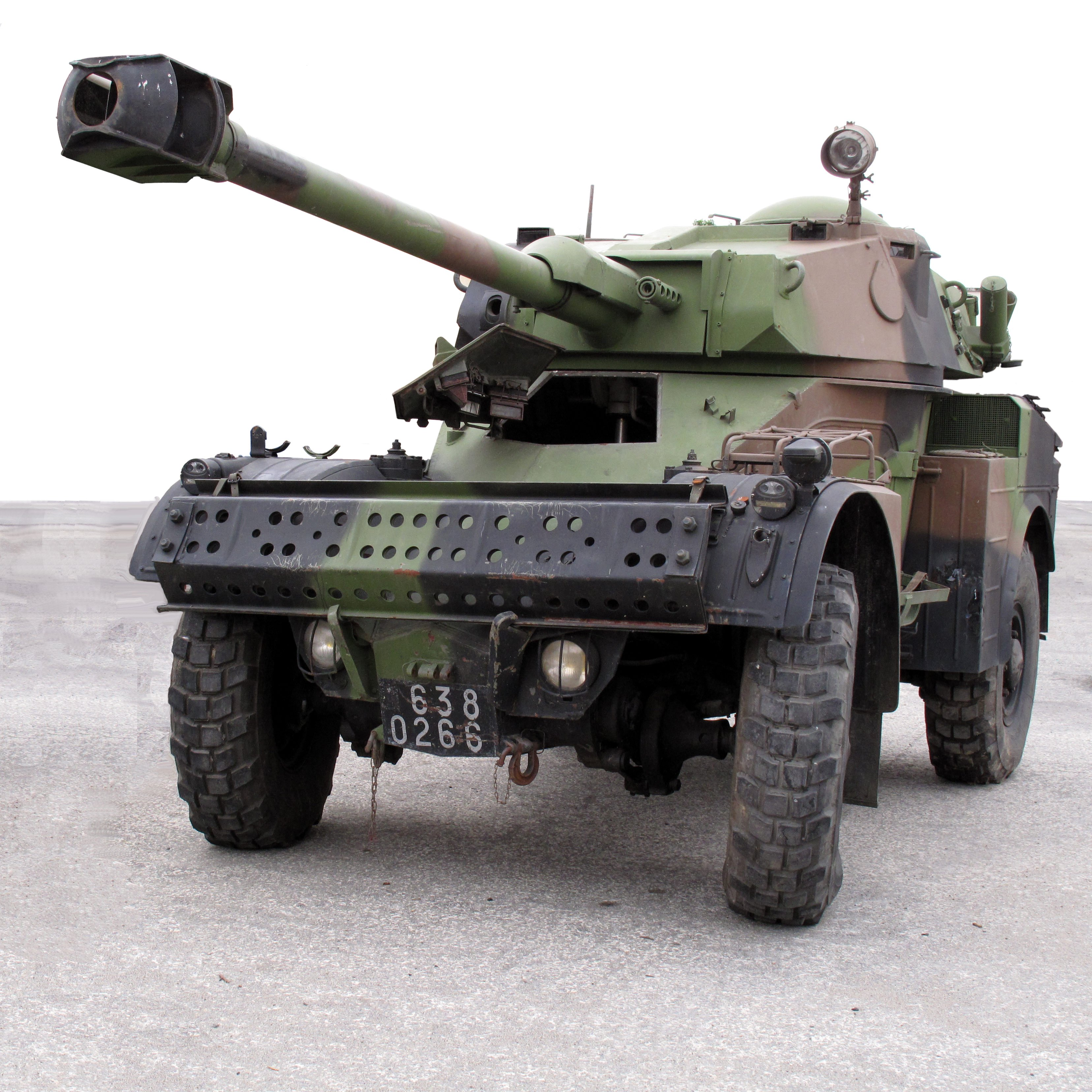
- Panhard AML at the Musée des Blindés, Saumur.
- Type: Armored car
- Place of origin: France

Service history
- Used by: See Operators
- Wars: List of Conflicts: Algerian War; Portuguese Colonial War; Six-Day War; War of Attrition; Angolan Civil War; Cambodian Civil War; Yom Kippur War; Falklands War; Lebanese Civil War; Shaba II; Ethiopian Civil War; Eritrean War of Independence; Salvadoran Civil War; Western Sahara War; Chadian–Libyan conflict; Somali Civil War; Iran–Iraq War; Gulf War; Djiboutian Civil War; Rwandan Civil War; First Congo War; Second Congo War; 2003 invasion of Iraq; Second Sudanese Civil War; Djiboutian–Eritrean border conflict; 2004 French–Ivorian clashes; First Ivorian Civil War; Second Ivorian Civil War; 2007 Lebanon conflict; Internal conflict in Burma; Operation Linda Nchi; Yemeni Crisis (2011–present); Syrian Civil War spillover in Lebanon

Production history
- Designed: 1959
- Manufacturer: Panhard
- Produced: 1960–1987
- No. built: 4,812
- Variants: See Variants

Specifications
- Mass: 5.5 tonnes (6.1 short tons; 5.4 long tons)
- Length: 5.11 m (16 ft 9 in)
- length: 3.79 m (12 ft 5 in) (hull)
- Width: 1.97 m (6 ft 6 in)
- Height: 2.07 m (6 ft 9 in)
- Crew: 3 (commander, driver, gunner)
- Main armament: 90 mm D921/GIAT F1 (20 rounds) or 60mm Brandt mortar (53 rounds)
- Secondary armament: 2 7.62 mm MAS coaxial machine guns (2,400–3,800 rounds)
- Engine: Panhard 1.99 L (121 in^{3}) Model 4 HD flat 4-cylinder air-cooled petrol 90 hp (67 kW) at 4,700 rpm
- Power/weight: 16.36 hp/tonne (11.9 kW/tonne)
- Suspension: Wheeled 4x4
- Ground clearance: 0.33 m (1 ft 1 in)
- Fuel capacity: 156 L (41 US gal)
- Operational range: 600 km (370 mi)
- Maximum speed: 100 km/h (62 mph)

The Panhard AML (automitrailleuse légère, or "light armoured car") is an armoured car with reconnaissance capability. Designed by Panhard on a lightly armoured 4×4 chassis, it weighs an estimated 5.5 tonnes, and is thus suitable for airborne deployment. Since 1959, AMLs have been marketed on up to five continents; several variants remained in continuous production for half a century. These have been operated by fifty-four national governments and other entities worldwide, seeing regular combat.

The AML-245 was once regarded as one of the most heavily armed scout vehicles in service, fitted with a low velocity DEFA D921 90 mm (3.54 in) rifled cannon firing conventional high explosive and high explosive anti-tank shells, or a 60 mm (2.36 in) breech loading mortar with 53 rounds and dual 7.5mm MAS AA-52 NF-1 machine guns with 3,800 rounds, all mounted coaxially in the turret. An AML is capable of destroying targets at 1,500 meters with its D921 main gun. In this configuration it is considered a match for second-line and older main battle tanks.

AMLs have appeared most prominently in Angola, Iraq, and Chad, as well as in the Lebanese Civil War between 1975 and 1990.

== History ==
During World War II, the French Army and their Free French successors used a wide variety of vehicles for reconnaissance duties, ranging from the compact Laffly S15 to the Panhard 178, which could mount the same 75 mm armament as contemporary heavy tanks, and multi-wheeled designs such as the Type 201. After the war it became less desirable to maintain this plethora of armoured cars. In July 1945 Paris issued a requirement for a postwar design combining those features of previous assets – especially the Type 201 – that had shown potential both during and before the Battle of France. This led to the 8x8 Panhard EBR (Type 212) which entered service in 1950. Similarly, in 1956 the French Ministry of Defense was persuaded to commission a replacement for the Daimler Ferret scout car. Also manufactured by Panhard, the successor was the AML (Type 245) which entered service in 1961.

As with much postwar hardware based on the experience of subsequent colonial theatres, the AML was recognized for its outstanding ruggedness, dependability, firepower-to-weight ratio, and adaptability to the numerous minor conflicts waged since 1945. This reputation has led to export success in over forty countries, Africa being one of its biggest markets.

=== Development ===
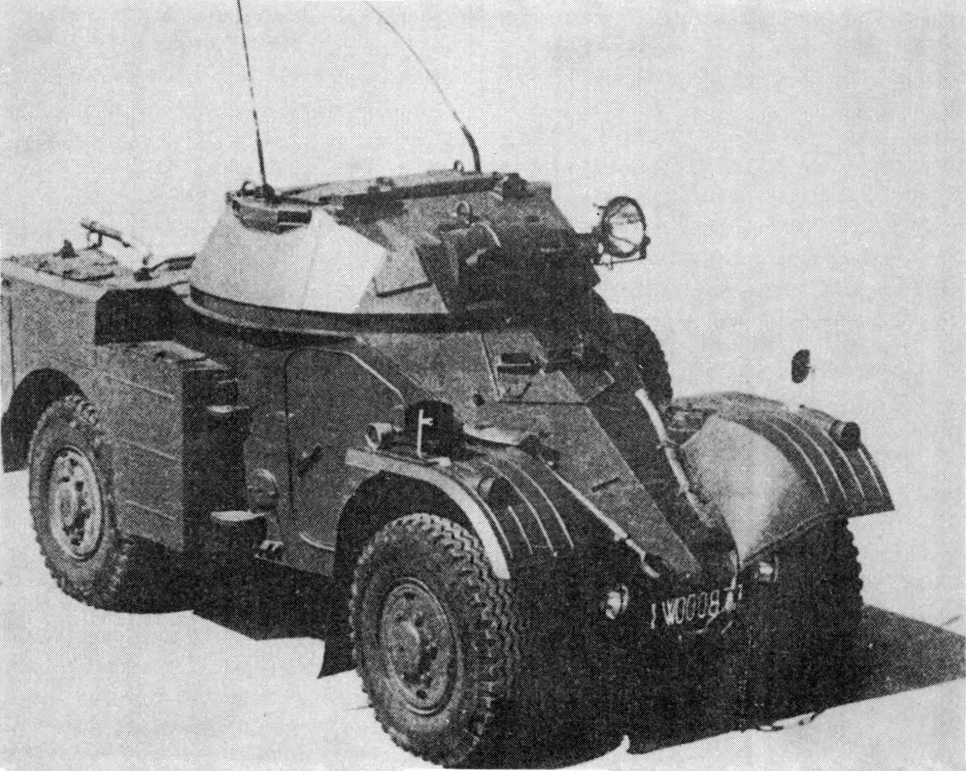
An early AML-60.

The Panhard AML was birthed as a private venture by the Société de Constructions Panhard et Levassor, a military subsidiary of PSA Peugeot Citroën. It was derived in part from the Daimler Ferret, offering important similarities in external design. The first prototype appeared in 1959 and the vehicle was put into production in 1960, with more than 4,000 examples constructed by the time production ended.

In the late 1950s, the French Army successfully operated a number of Ferret scout cars in Algeria. Impressive as they were from a conventional standpoint, the rest of France's existing light armour—such as the Panhard EBR and M8 Greyhound—were not suitably equipped for counter-insurgency; battles of the Algerian War often involved short, sharp, skirmishes which required indirect fire support weapons such as mortars rather than solid shot and shell. In addition, the North African conditions demanded a lighter, less sophisticated, vehicle which would be simpler to maintain and operate. As an interim measure France had purchased two hundred Ferrets from the United Kingdom. These were light enough but carried only a single general-purpose machine gun, which was inadequate for offensive purposes. Nevertheless, they were sufficiently successful that there was a possibility of producing the Ferret under licence in France. However, Saviem, Berliet, and Panhard petitioned for bidding on a home-grown vehicle, and in 1956 the Ministère de la Défense issued specifications for an indigenous wheeled armoured car of similar dimensions and layout to the Ferret but mounting a breech-loading mortar. By 1959, this had emerged as the Auto Mitrailleuse Légère, designated Model 245 "B" by Panhard. Early prototypes were completed in mid-1959 and by the end of 1961 at least one regiment in Algeria was receiving them. The AML was equipped with a 60mm Brandt gun-mortar and two medium MAS AA-52 NF-1 machine guns. Until Panhard's acquisition by Citroën later in the 1960s, it was manufactured at a single plant near the Porte de Choisy in the 13th arrondissement of Paris.

The AML was immediately successful, but as the Algerian conflict diminished so did the need for a light mortar carrier deployed in anti-guerrilla operations. A more primary concern was the conventional threat posed by Soviet airborne armoured vehicles such as the ASU-85 in the event of a Warsaw Pact invasion by air, which was then a major concern of French military strategists. Meanwhile, South Africa, an AML customer which had considered adopting the British Alvis Saladin, also charged Panhard technicians to look into the development of an AML variant with equal or superior fire support capability. This and the adoption of a highly effective 90 mm rifled cannon led to all new AML-245 "C"s being refitted with the H-90 turret sporting the new gun. It fired fin-stabilised, shaped charge, projectiles boasting a muzzle velocity of 760 m/s and more than capable of penetrating 320 mm of rolled homogeneous armour. In consequence, the later AMLs could even engage main battle tanks. In addition to its high explosive anti-tank (HEAT) shells the H-90 also carries fin-stabilised high-explosive (HE) projectiles, the total number of rounds stored being 20, compared with the 53 of the original 60 mm mortar version.

To provide a complete family of wheeled armoured cars, Panhard used AML components to engineer a small personnel carrier, the Véhicule Transport de Troupes, better known as the Panhard M3. The M3 consisted of a boxy, all-welded, hull with an engine relocated behind the driver in order to provide a large troop compartment at its rear. Its wheelbase was also increased from the AML's 2.5m to a higher 2.7m. and the track from 1.62 to 2.5m. In spite of this, maintenance alongside the AML fleet is rather simplified, given that both vehicles share a 95% interchangeability in automotive parts. The export success of the AML and M3 led directly to the development of the Panhard ERC 90 Sagaie and Panhard VCR, respectively, which were six-wheeled and could carry a wider range of heavy weapon systems.

Mass production of the AML likely ceased at some point prior to the early 1980s. However, AMLs continued to be sold from French Army surplus stocks as late as 1999, when the final export orders were placed by Yemen and Tunisia. They were also marketed by a number of other second-hand suppliers, including South Africa, Israel, and Saudi Arabia.

=== Specifications ===
Fitted with coil spring suspension and drum brakes, the AML lacks hydraulic assist on either brakes or steering; only front wheels steer. Consequently, the steering wheel requires considerable strength to turn while the vehicle is in motion—while stationary it remains effectively locked. Much like the Ferret, rear wheel drive is transmitted directly to epicyclic hub reduction gears, also known as bevel boxes. The motor and gearbox have been harnessed via a centrifugal clutch with electromagnetic control, eliminating the need for a clutch pedal. This type of clutch is automatically engaged by gripping the knob of the gearshift lever, which is located behind the driver's seat in the hull floor. The gearbox assembly consists of two separate gearboxes, one for high and the other for low gear. The low-range gearbox is designed for off-road use and has a reverse gear and a top gear, while the high-range box is for operation on roads and has three low gears and one overdrive. There is a hydraulic dual-circuit handbrake operating on the gearbox output shaft.

An AML's crankshaft is carried in three ball bearings to reduce motor friction. Powerplant design was inspired by the Panhard EBR and incorporates an air-cooled 1.99 litre four cylinder engine developing 67 kW (90 hp). The Panhard engine was somewhat underpowered for the five to six tonne armoured car, and remained prone to mechanical failure in humid climates. Under temperate conditions it was capable of providing good operational service up to 26,000 kilometres before needing replacement. AMLs may also be fitted with a variety of liquid-cooled engines, although as demonstrated by its Eland Mk7 counterpart this requires a costly reconstruction of the rear hull to accommodate the new cooling apparatus.

AML hulls are assembled from only 13 welded pieces, with a driver seated at the front of the hull and the turret to his immediate rear. Above both doors the hull widens into a circular flange onto which the turret is bolted. This makes the turret basket extremely cramped, and little space is available above an AML-90's turret ring due to the massive gun breech and somewhat haphazard ammunition stowage. There are optical ring sights in front of both turret seats for quick laying of the main armament. AML turrets have a two-man crew, with the commander seated on the left and the gunner on the right. Depending on the variant, either may operate the roof-mounted searchlight. Seven periscopes are provided for the turret crew and three for the AML's driver. One of the three driving periscopes may be substituted with an infrared or image intensification periscope for night operations.

On either side of the hull below the turret ring is an access door, one for the driver on the right and one intended for emergency purposes on the left. The left hull door, on which a spare wheel and tyre or fuel cans may be mounted, opens to the rear while the right hull door opens to the front. The engine housing at the rear of the hull is accessed through two access panels, and is insulated from the crew compartment by a removable bulkhead. Two sand channels resembling those on the Ferret are bolted to the hull front for crossing ditches and other obstacles.

The AML uses nitrogen inner tubes (in this case Hutchinson V.P.-P.V.s) adopted from the EBR, providing run flat capability on 41 cm (16 in.)-diameter wheels; its 280 mm (11 in.) wide Michelin tyres can be deflated to reduce ground pressure to as low as 70 to 110 kPa (10 to 16 psi). These have been replaced in some Anglophone armies by the Dunlop Trak Grips also favoured in Bedford and Alvis military vehicles.

== Service history ==
=== Europe ===
==== France ====
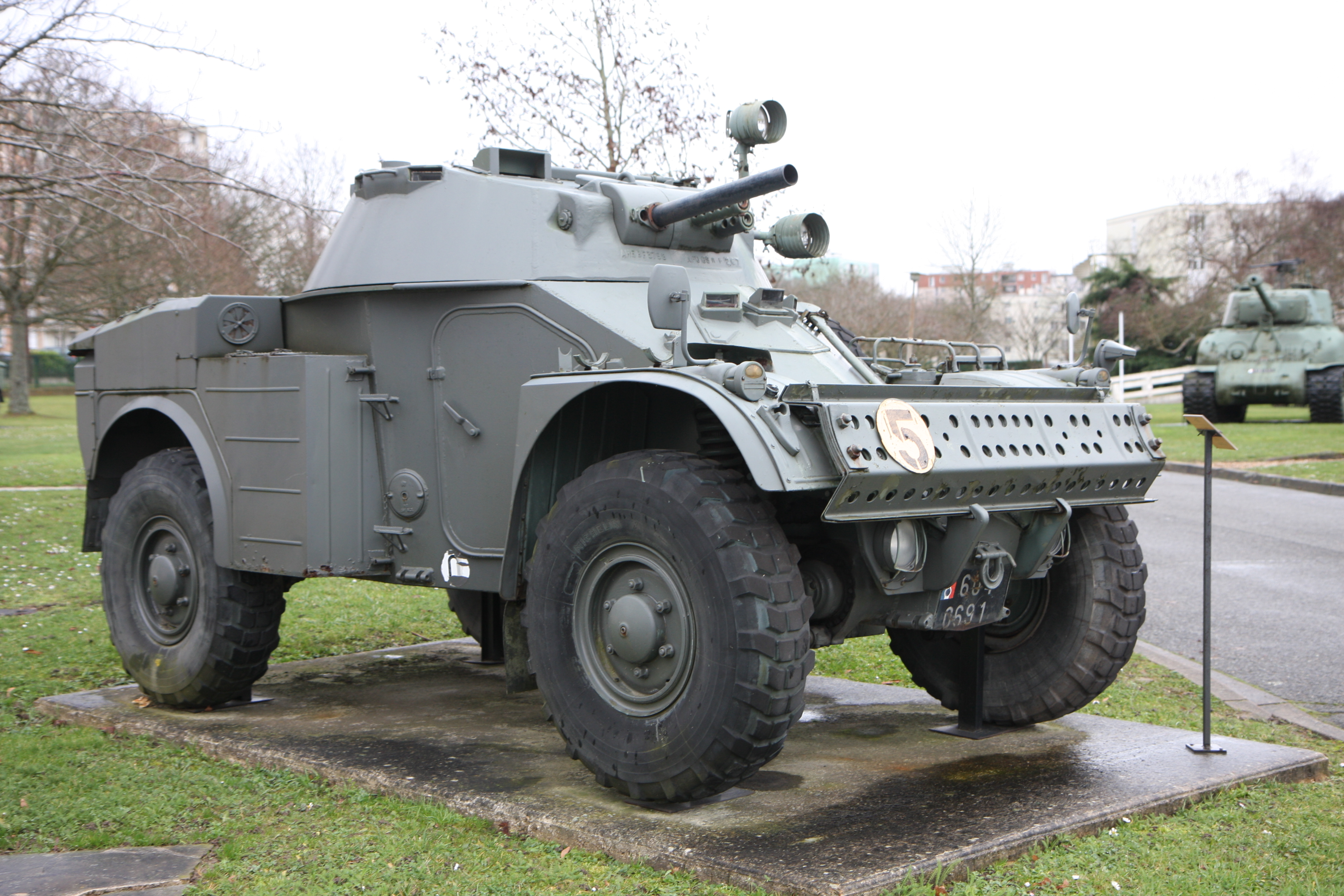
Panhard AML-60, one of several which entered service with the French Mobile Gendarmerie.

French military doctrine recognised two separate fields of armoured vehicle deployment, the first consisting of primary tasks such as manoeuvre and combat, while the second included other tasks such as rearguard defence, liaison, and deception. The latter was to be the responsibility of a mobile reserve which provided interior security during wartime – designated Défense opérationnelle du territoire (DOT) armoured cavalry regiments. Initially equipped with AMLs and jeeps modified for scouting purposes, these units worked closely with the French police and National Gendarmerie. Their goal was to intercept hostile special forces or airborne units which specialised in deep penetration behind the front line. Secondary tasks included counter-insurgency, passive observation, and guarding static installations.

Each DOT troop came to include three AML platoons. As they were expected to remain faithful to the traditional mission of reconnaissance where observation had priority over combat, a number of the AML-60s seem to have been stripped of their main armament, necessitating crew dependence on the vehicle's secondary automatic weapons. Nevertheless, to counter the mechanised threat posed by Soviet and other Warsaw Pact airborne forces, which often deployed with their own armour such as the ASU-57, BMD-1, and ASU-85, the AML-90s were favoured as well. DOT regiments came to hold a generic pool of sixteen AML-90s and thirty-four other AMLs of varying configuration.

As the AML was readily air transportable, it came to form the materiel strongpoint of the French Foreign Legion's rapid deployment force. The Legion AMLs saw combat overseas, either as part of single deployments by the 1st Foreign Cavalry Regiment or to provide fire support for other Legion regiments. Crews perfected unique airfield assaults in which AML-90s were unloaded directly from Transall C-160s onto the objective, with infantry joining them by parachute. They could also deploy from Breguet 941 and Nord Noratlas aircraft. These vehicles first saw combat against BTR-152s manned by FROLINAT rebels in Chad during Opération Tacaud, successfully engaging an insurgent mechanised column approaching Salal around April 1978. On 18 May another sixteen AMLs, supported by a company of French infantry, routed FROLINAT elements advancing on Ati. In the subsequent months, additional AML-90s rushed in by the Régiment d'infanterie-chars de marine (RICM) repelled a major offensive near Abéché by the Chadian Democratic Revolutionary Council, which was backed by fifty Libyan T-55 tanks and EE-9 Cascavel armoured cars.

Despite the intensity of these clashes, only three French AMLs were lost in Chad between 1978 and 1979, most likely to RPG-7s. The Foreign Legion's AML squadrons continued to see action during Operation Manta and the extended Opération Épervier, being organised into anti-tank support groups for three battalion-sized task forces. Their speed and mobility proved instrumental in destroying much heavier Libyan main battle tanks. However, the French crews could only make up for their inferiority in firepower by outflanking the tanks first or attacking from the rear, and by the mid 1980s the threat posed by large Libyan armoured formations was considered so severe a squadron of AMX-10RCs had to be deployed as well.

A single RICM AML platoon was deployed to assist in the 1979 overthrow of the Central African Empire during Operation Caban, likely shifted from Marine contingents stationed in Chad or Gabon. The armoured cars were landed at the airport in concert with French paratroopers during a textbook airborne assault; however, the defending Central African troops surrendered without offering resistance. AMLs did not see action again until Operation Épaulard I, when twenty AML-60s and AML-90s were deployed for infantry support purposes. As the French infantrymen lacked heavy weapons of their own, they remained dependent on the AMLs for suppressing hard targets; this persuaded the French Army of the need for infantry fighting vehicles in overseas operations. The AML-90s were later used by the RICM against the Rwandan Patriotic Front during the Rwandan Civil War.

The Mobile Gendarmerie operated over a hundred AML-60s and AML-90s, which were allocated to nineteen separate squadrons. The AML was superseded in service with the Mobile Gendarmerie by the VBC-90 at the end of the 1980s.

The last AMLs were withdrawn from active service in the French Army in 1991, being superseded by the Panhard ERC and the AMX-10RC. France retained about three hundred of these AMLs in storage as part of its strategic reserve as late as 1995. A small number were also used to simulate OPFOR armoured vehicles at the Centre d'entraînement aux actions en zone urbaine (CENZUB) until 2012, when they were finally decommissioned.

==== Portugal ====
Franco-Portuguese military relations experienced a significant improvement during the 1960s, with the establishment of a French strategic missile tracking site on Flores Island in the Azores. The Portuguese government was compensated with French arms, which it acquired under especially generous terms. Following the outbreak of the Portuguese Colonial War, Lisbon began ordering AML-60s for deployment to its three African territories: Angola, Mozambique, and Guinea-Bissau. The armoured cars were purchased on long-term credit, with the French government granting payment facilities ranging from ten to twenty years, at six per cent annual interest. About 50 AML-60s were delivered to the Portuguese Army between 1965 and 1968 to complement the ageing EBR already in service. They were circulated largely among reconnaissance platoons in Africa, which utilised them for convoy escort purposes. Severe maintenance problems were soon encountered in the corrosive tropical environment, compounded by excessive dust, which caused transmission and engine damage. Most AMLs stalled during their initial convoy support missions and had to be towed behind other vehicles. These issues were later rectified by the installation of custom Volkswagen air intakes. Around the early 1970s, all Portuguese AML-60s in Angola were retrofitted with liquid-cooled, four-cylinder General Motors engines and pressure plate clutches, giving them a resemblance to the Eland Mk7. The new engines were adopted because they were cheaper to replace and Portugal found it easier to source their associated parts.

In 1974, a squadron of AML-60s seconded to the Portuguese Army's School of Cavalry at Santarém took part in the Carnation Revolution, which heralded the collapse of the country's ruling Estado Novo regime and its colonial empire. The following year, when Portugal withdrew from Angola under the terms of the Alvor Agreement, 5 AML-60s were abandoned in that country and subsequently taken into service by Angolan factions. About 36 of the remaining AMLs were redistributed to the Regimento de Cavalaria N.º 3 (3rd Cavalry Regiment) and Regimento de Cavalaria N.º 6 (6th Cavalry Regiment), while the others were held in reserve.

The Portuguese government entered into negotiations with a local subsidiary of Opel in 1982 to upgrade its entire AML fleet with liquid-cooled engines and pressure plate clutches, exempting those which had already received similar modifications during their service in Angola. Opel upgraded one AML for evaluation purposes before the programme was abandoned. Another, more successful, project entailed the addition of Portuguese PRC-239 wireless radio sets and communications equipment. The AML-60s were retired from 1989 onwards and replaced by the Véhicule Blindé Léger.

=== Middle East ===
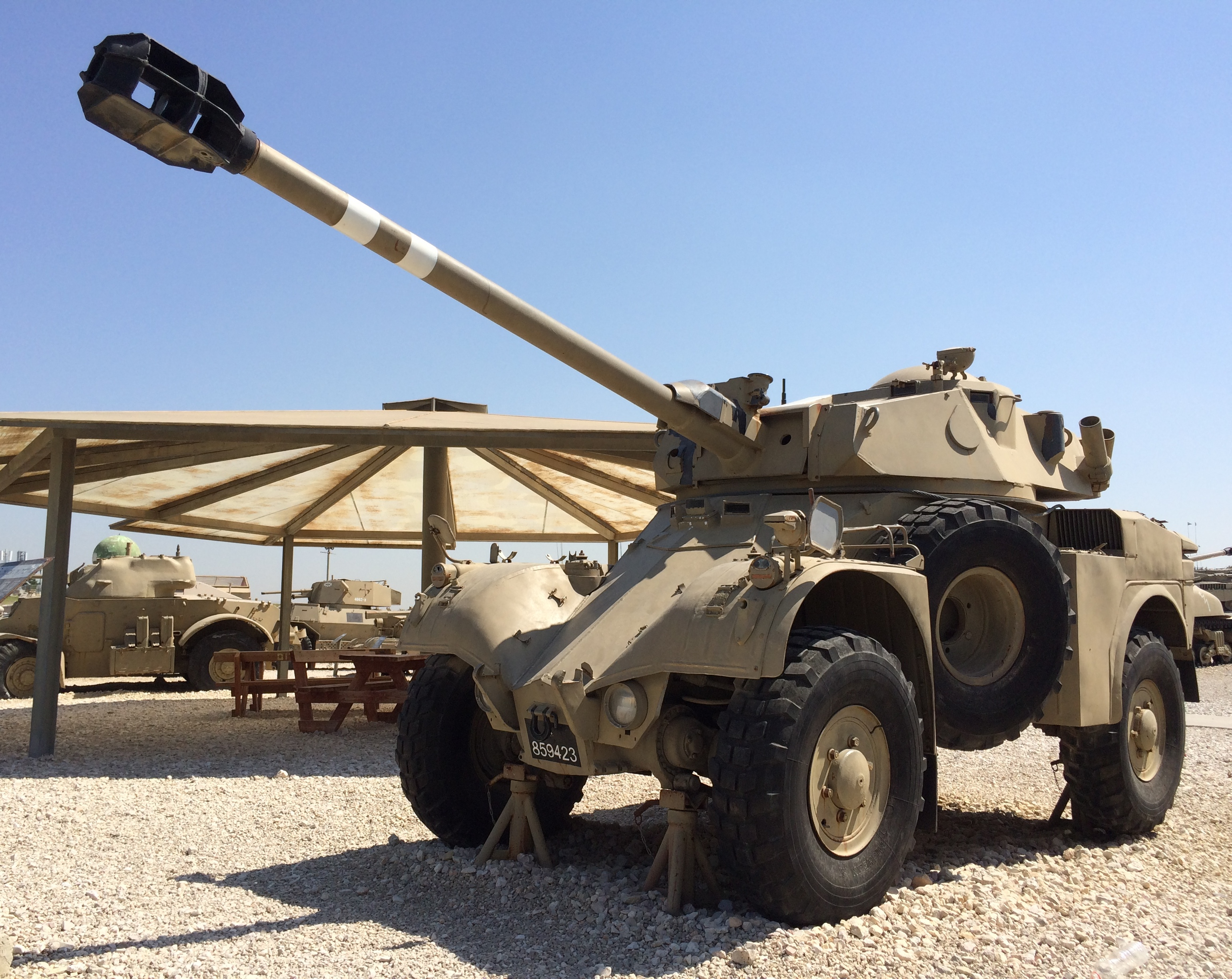
Plinthed Israeli AML-90 at Yad La-Shiryon.

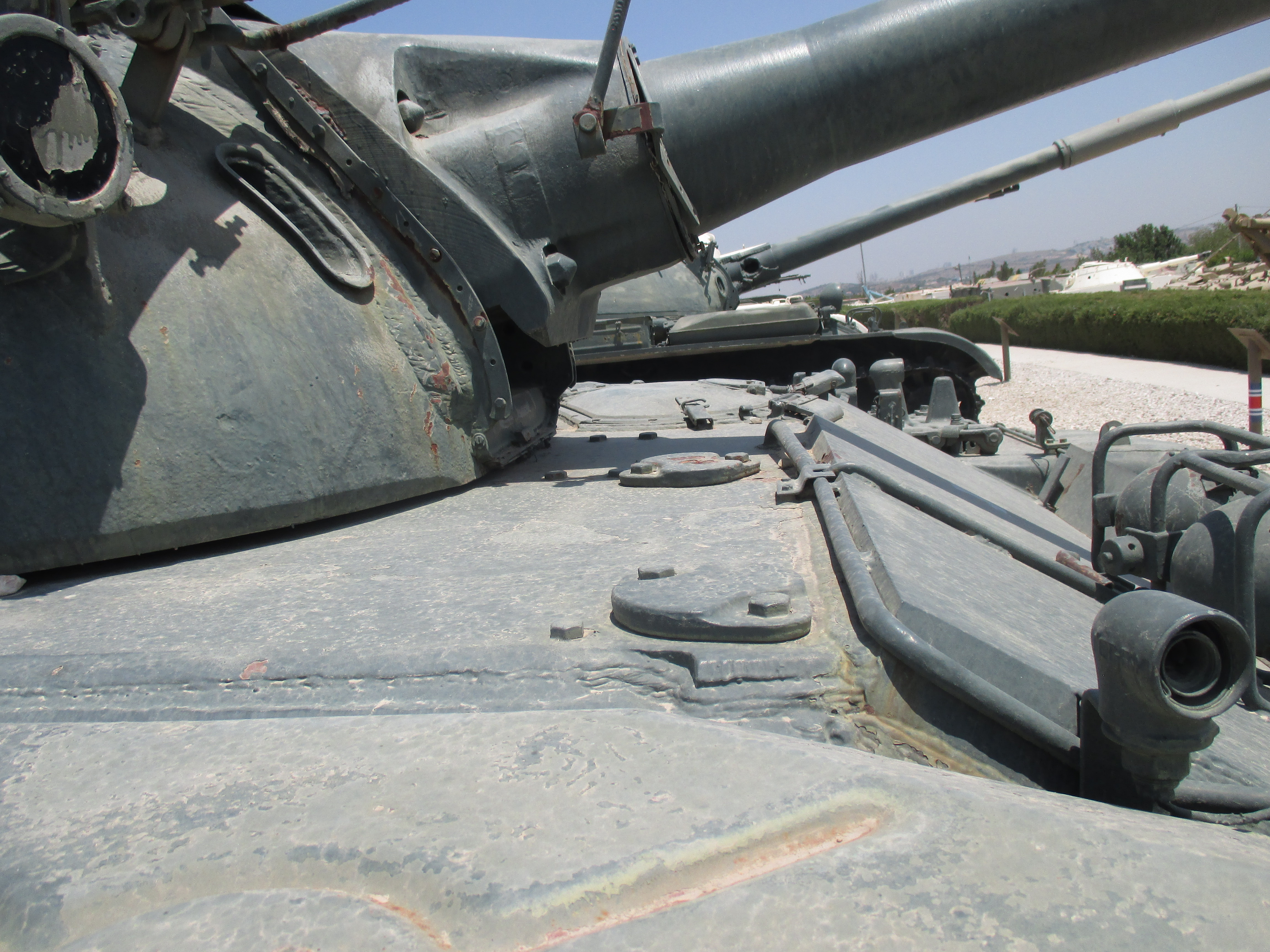
Flat margin (turret race) between an Egyptian T-54/55's turret and angled glacis, one of the few areas on the tank vulnerable to 90 mm HEAT munitions.

==== Israel ====
An order of 29 AML-90s placed by the Israel Defense Forces (IDF) in 1960 marked the first sale of AMLs to a foreign power, ushered in a new era of French arms sales to Jerusalem, and helped cement Panhard's success on the export market. The IDF armoured cars had been received by the end of 1963 and were first displayed publicly on the eve of Yom Ha'atzmaut, 1966. Israeli units were primarily impressed by their high mobility and ergonomic nature, which was deemed ideal for airborne operations. Nevertheless, the AML-90's envisaged deployment by new Aérospatiale SA 321 Super Frelons also purchased from France did not materialise, as the helicopters could not handle its 5,500 kg combat weight.

At least 9 AML-90s were in service with the 41st Reconnaissance Company of the Harel Brigade during the Six-Day War under a Major Amnon Eshkol, participating in the capture of Ramallah in June 1967. The AMLs were initially posted at Mevaseret Zion following the fall of East Jerusalem. They were among the first IDF armour to cross into the West Bank during the conflict, probing for Jordanian resistance. Major roads had been blocked by tank barriers although these could be easily bypassed in nimbler armoured cars. The much more cumbersome Super Sherman and Centurion tanks tasked with leading the IDF's spearhead towards Tell el-Ful failed to reach their objective; most were forced to turn back in the face of difficult terrain. Joined by the surviving seven Shermans and eight M3 half-tracks, Major Eshkol's AML-90s later helped defeat a Jordanian counterattack with M48 Pattons.

In the War of Attrition, Israeli AMLs faced Jordanian M48s again on the Damia Bridge during the Battle of Karameh. Originally tasked with screening the IDF Centurions as they crossed the bridge, the lightly armoured AML-90 was at a unique disadvantage when confronted by entrenched Pattons. Moreover, the Jordan River was in flood and vehicle crews were unable to exploit their manoeuvrability in the muddy farmland. Several AMLs were knocked out by tank fire or towed anti-tank guns. They were withdrawn from service not long afterwards.

The Arab–Israeli conflict marked some of the highest armour-to-armour kill ratios achieved with the AML platform to date, including the destruction of at least 13 Egyptian and Jordanian tanks. Especially notable were several T-54 kills credited to an AML-90 platoon in the Sinai Peninsula: as late as the 1980s, military scholars continued to maintain that the 90 mm DEFA cannon lacked the muzzle velocity to penetrate the thick steel hull of a T-54/55. More well-documented cases have since verified this was possible, though only with multiple shots or a direct hit on the turret rim near the driver's hatch. Israeli AML crews also sustained losses of their own during this engagement, and some AML-90s may have been captured intact by the Egyptian defenders.

==== Saudi Arabia ====
In 1964, the Royal Saudi Army issued a requirement for an armoured car proven in desert warfare and equipped with a large semi-automatic cannon. Bids were accepted from three companies—Alvis, Cadillac Gage, and Panhard—which offered the Saladin, V-100 Commando, and AML, respectively, but the debate over which of the three to adopt was hamstrung by political considerations early on. Saudi Arabia remained inhibited from seeking American assistance in devising suitable defence programmes by the criticism and hostility of other Arab states. Under these circumstances, only arms transactions with French or British firms could be entertained. Despite longstanding diplomatic contacts, the French presence in Riyadh was rather limited compared to that of the United Kingdom, and the latter was in a better position to provide long-term logistical support for armoured cars to the Saudi military. Alvis was initially awarded a contract for 83 Saladins with a ten-year option on spare parts. Final negotiations for the delivery of the Saladins were underway when Sultan bin Abdulaziz abruptly cancelled the purchase in favour of Panhard.

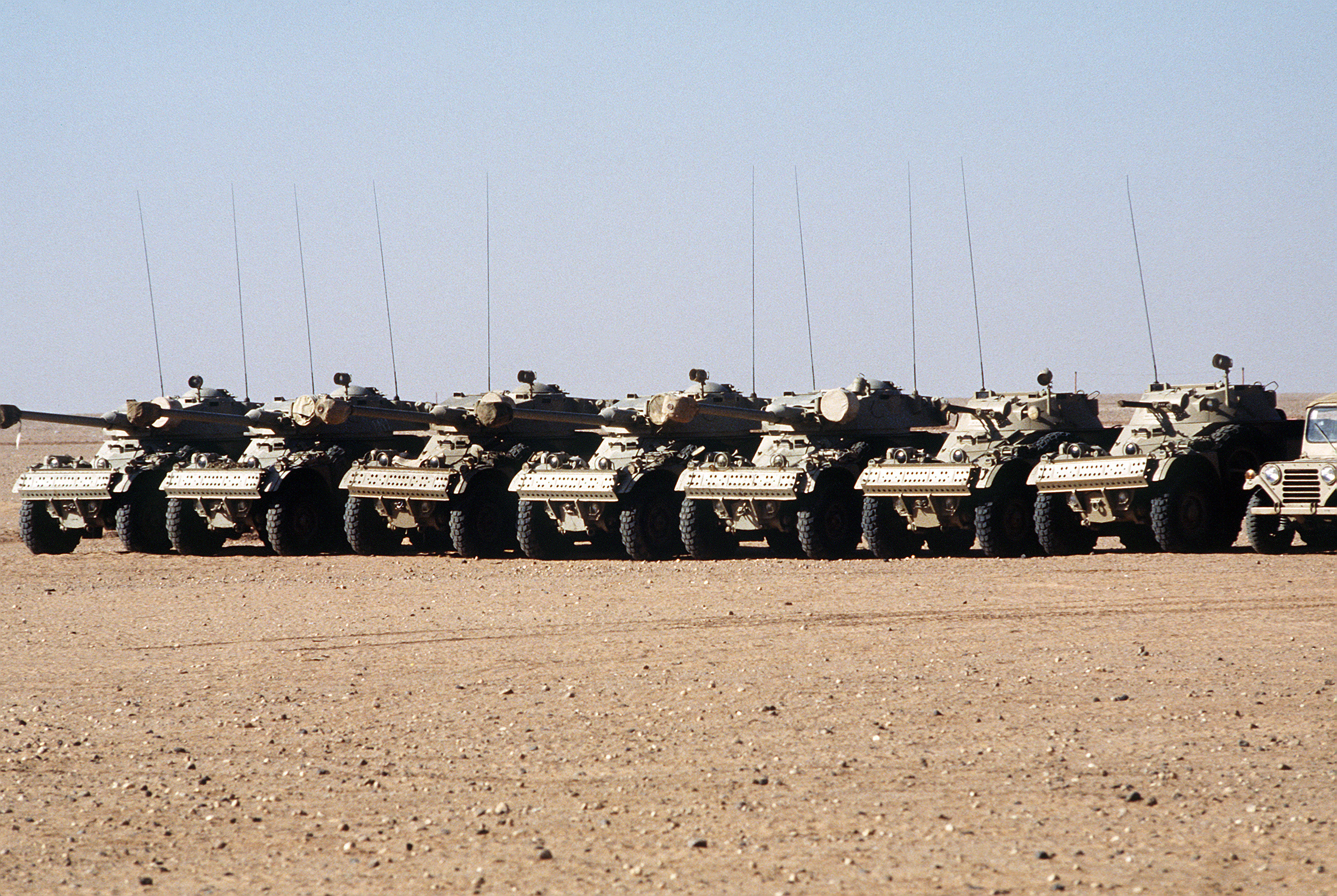
Saudi AML-90s and AML-60s donated to the Niger Armed Forces during Operation Desert Shield.

The $95 million Panhard deal proved instrumental in breaking existing preconceptions that the Arabian arms market was well protected by the UK. Gaullist circles heralded it as a major business and political success. In an interview in Beirut, Sultan bin Abdulaziz merely asserted that AMLs were selected as part of King Faisal's policy to strengthen the army with a greater infusion of modern arms. Saudi Army officials had preferred the heavier Saladin and appreciated its worthiness in desert conditions, but conceded the AML-90 was much cheaper. Panhard undertook the order amid much protest by pro-Israel lobbyists in France, who urged restraint in shipping arms to Arab bloc states likely to use them against Tel-Aviv. The sale was also challenged as a violation of Charles de Gaulle's Middle Eastern embargo, although the French government insisted it did not classify armoured scout cars as the same "heavy war materiel" covered by sanctions.

Saudi AML-90s of the 20th Armoured Brigade were blooded near Daraa during the Yom Kippur War, having been airlifted to assist its Syrian defenders in Lockheed C-130 Hercules aircraft loaned from Iran. The airlift was carried out on October 14, 1973; six Iranian C-130s were needed to convey the vehicles and about 2,000 motorised infantrymen from Saudi Arabia to Syria. AML crews were generally assigned to static guard duty, patrolling the Damascus-Daraa road and keeping lines of communications clear between the multinational Arab forces. At least one AML-90 was captured by the Golani Brigade, likely while attempting to reconnoiter an IDF position after dark. The captured vehicle was later displayed by Israeli officials to the international press as proof of direct Saudi military involvement in the Syrian war effort.

On October 16, the 7th Brigade, 71st Tank Battalion of the IDF's 36th Armoured Division reported clashing with the Saudi armoured cars as they performed reconnaissance for Iraqi forces near Tel Antar. The Saudis quickly disengaged. At some point between this skirmish and the evening of October 17, all the Saudi AMLs—almost a composite light armoured battalion—launched an unsuccessful attack on IDF positions at the village of Tel Merai. Thereafter the remaining armoured cars and their crews were integrated with the Jordanian 40th Armoured Brigade. On October 19, they participated in a joint offensive with that unit but were halted by accurate tank fire from the IDF's 17th Reserve Armour Brigade and forced to retreat.

The Israelis claimed to have destroyed most of the Saudi AMLs at Tel Merai. Saudi accounts acknowledge the loss of only 4 AMLs; furthermore, the Saudis claimed to have knocked out 5 Israeli tanks and damaged 5 more.

Saudi Arabia ordered between 200 and 220 AMLs from France in 1968, with deliveries completed by 1970. Some sources have claimed a second order was placed in 1978 for another 250. The Saudi Army has since retired much of its Panhard fleet and exported surplus stocks to various nations. During the Gulf War, an estimated 200 AML-90s were phased from service. Upon learning that the Senegalese units participating in Operation Desert Shield were also familiar with the Panhard type, General Khalid bin Sultan ordered a number retained for their use. The armoured cars were hurriedly serviced, then donated to Senegal. (Note: Per Khalid bin Sultan: I recalled we were phasing out of our armed forces over 200 French-built AML-90 Panhard armored fighting vehicles of a type with which the Senegalese were familiar. "How many can you make operational?" I asked. "As many as you want." "Fine. Hold on to them." In due course, we issued these vehicles to the Senegalese, and also to the contingents from Niger and Morocco, and at the end of the war, on Prince Sultan's instructions, we gave the armored cars to them in gratitude for their help.) Large quantities were also accepted by Morocco and Niger.

==== Lebanon ====
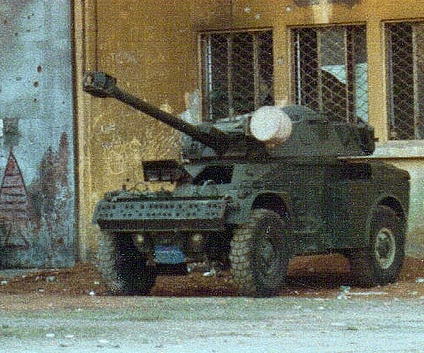
AML-90 of the Lebanese Army in Beirut, 1982.

At least 74 AML-90s were delivered to the Lebanese Armed Forces (LAF) between 1970 and 1975, and saw considerable action in the Lebanese Civil War. As their crews often left them unguarded outside army compounds, several may have been stolen by LAF deserters on their way to join regional militias. Others vanished during the disintegration of individual battalions, and by 1981 Lebanon's fleet had dwindled to 52. The surviving AML squadrons remained plagued by chronic shortages of personnel; some crews even fought in their turrets without a trained commander and depended on inexperienced spotters outside the vehicles to guide their fire. This resulted in phenomenal inaccuracy.

Following the Battle of the Hotels, Lebanese Front troops in the Port District of Beirut brought their Panhards into action for the first time in the civil war, engaging Charioteer tanks crewed by Amal and Lebanese Arab Army (LAA) militants. Having lost nearly all their heavy armour and tanks to the militias, the predominantly Christian remnants of the Lebanese Army appropriated three AML-90s and nine obsolete T17 Staghounds to stave off repeated assaults by LAA forces from the hotel district. Due to the armoured cars' heightened vulnerability to RPG-7s, their crews began using debris as makeshift barricades. Muslim fighters failed in attempting to destroy the AMLs with RPGs, as well as B-10 and M40 recoilless rifles, since the projectiles lacked a clear trajectory in the rubble. The AML-90s' immense firepower at close quarters soon resulted in great structural damage to portside Beirut; a number of fortified buildings were wrecked by 90 mm HE shells, and those struck by multiple HEAT volleys demolished on their foundations. With truck-mounted ZU-23-2s covering their advance, the AMLs advanced on Allenby Street, flattening all resistance, and took the waterfront. Although both the LAA and the leftist Lebanese National Movement hastily brought up Charioteers and M41 Walker Bulldog tanks, so much wreckage was blocking the streets they could not manoeuvre. It was impossible to shoot accurately through the debris, and tanks could only manage speculative fire to discourage the AMLs.

In 1983, LAF tanks with AML-90s in support were sent to eliminate Amal militants then threatening elements of Multinational Force in Lebanon (MNF) at the Lebanese University. Following the Siege of Beirut, the LAF again mobilised its AMLs to occupy positions vacated by withdrawing Israeli troops. An undisclosed number were upgraded to AML-90 Lynx standard, including laser rangefinders, and continued to see service as late as 2014 against Syrian militants.

===== Militia use =====
Panhard AMLs were favoured by the Lebanese militias due to their flexibility, especially in urban combat situations which saw them deployed against heavier Syrian armour. A detailed analysis undertaken by the United States Army Research Laboratory in 1979 found the AML "operated effectively in Beirut" and noted that "the ease with which the Panhard is driven and repaired, and the absence of tracks, provide the mobility desirable in an urban environment." Modifications to militia AMLs included replacement of the original Michelin tyres with an air-pocketed type more resistant to mortar shrapnel, as well as increased armour plate – fabricated after the appearance of Syrian tanks made it difficult ordering volunteers to man the lightly protected vehicles.

Christian Phalangist militiamen deployed twelve AML-90s as assault guns during the Siege of Tel al-Zaatar, using their elevated 90 mm cannon to knock out second or third storey fortifications shielding Palestinian guerrillas. AML-90s of the Druze Progressive Socialist Party's (PSP) People's Liberation Army (PLA) militia also swung into action against five Staghounds of the Lebanese Internal Security Forces during a raid on Fayadiyeh barracks in mid-1976. The armoured cars were incompetently handled by the leftist forces, and later abandoned near Kahale with an AMX-13 due to mechanical problems.

===== UNIFIL =====
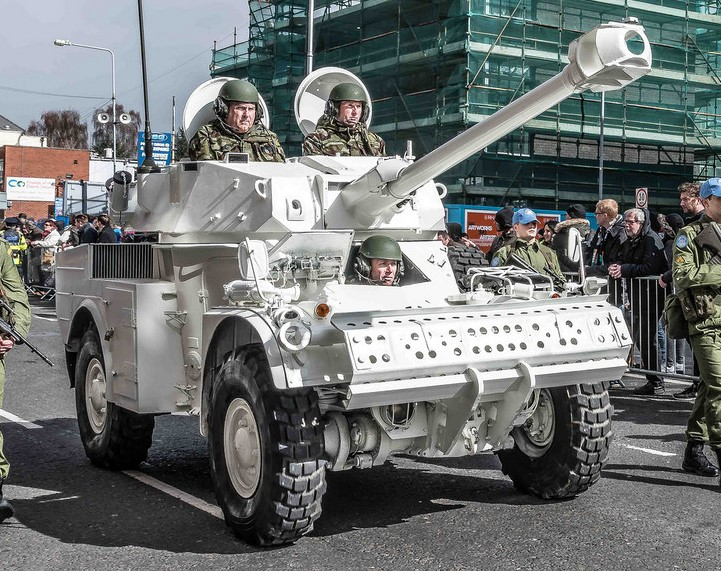
Irish UNIFIL AML-90. AMLs have been deployed in support of eight UN-affiliated peacekeeping missions since UNFICYP in 1964.

In April 1978, AMLs of the Irish Army were deployed with the United Nations Interim Force in Lebanon (UNIFIL), where they saw considerable action against the South Lebanon Army (SLA) militia. Ireland had originally purchased 16 AML-60s in 1964 for its large United Nations Peacekeeping Force in Cyprus (UNFICYP) contingent. The deterioration of the security situation there led to its purchase of another 16 AML-60s and 20 AML-90s, which had been initially rejected due to their expense but were now deemed necessary for their significant offensive capabilities. A reconnaissance company consisting of at least 4 UNFICYP AML-90s and 14 Panhard M3s were subsequently shipped from Cyprus to Lebanon alongside the 43rd Irish Battalion, which joined the newly formed UNIFIL. As the most heavily armed of the national UNIFIL contingents, the Irish AMLs frequently functioned as a mobile force reserve. They were also used for manning checkpoints between the belligerent SLA and Palestine Liberation Organization (PLO) positions. By 1980 at least one AML had been damaged by a PLO RPG-7 aimed at the SLA lines. The armoured car caught fire, though all three crew members survived.

On August 12, 1980, SLA militiamen attacked an Irish UNIFIL checkpoint at the village of At Tiri in southern Lebanon, having been antagonised by a statement made by Brian Lenihan Snr, Ireland's minister for foreign affairs, which they perceived as supportive of the PLO. One peacekeeper was mortally wounded, nine others taken prisoner, and the checkpoint overrun. The SLA then deployed four M9 Half-tracks equipped with Browning HB heavy machine guns, which they used to harass UNIFIL convoys. Two days later, Irish AML-90s counterattacked and retook the village. One half-track was immobilised, and a second destroyed after receiving a direct hit from a 90 mm shell. A third was abandoned when its Browning was disabled by warning fire from an AML's coaxial machine gun. The armoured cars also held a tense standoff with SLA M50 "Super" Sherman tanks on the outskirts of At Tiri, although the latter ultimately declined to intervene in the fighting and were not engaged by Irish forces. They withdrew upon the arrival of Dutch UNIFIL reinforcements armed with BGM-71 TOW missiles.

At least one AML-90 crew commander was awarded Ireland's highest military honour, the Military Medal for Gallantry, for actions during the At Tiri engagement. Irish AMLs may have seen action again in 1996 during Operation Grapes of Wrath.

==== Yemen ====
In 1974, North Yemeni political leader Abdullah ibn Husayn al-Ahmar traveled to Saudi Arabia to negotiate the transfer of arms to the fledgling Yemen Arab Republic, which was rebuilding its armed forces after a recent civil war. The Royal Saudi Army agreed to donate 31 AML-90s from its own stocks, as well as provide the necessary instructors for training Yemeni crews. When Ali Abdullah Saleh became president of North Yemen in the late 1970s, the AML-90s were transferred to various paramilitary units in Sanaa and repurposed as internal security vehicles. Upon Yemeni unification, they were adopted into the integrated Republic of Yemen Armed Forces. Yemen purchased another 15 AML-90s and AML-60s from France in 1998.

In the early 2000s, Yemen's army and security forces possessed a fleet of 125 AML-90s and 60 AMLs of other variants, most of which had been acquired from undisclosed sources. Due to attrition and age, the fleet dwindled to 95 by 2013. In 2014, the Yemeni army stripped a number of AML-90s of their turrets and refitted them to its BTR-60PB armoured personnel carriers, suggesting the former were finally nearing the end of their service life. Some AMLs have continued to see service in the ongoing Yemeni Civil War.

==== Iraq ====
During the mid 1960s, France was investigating new sources for cheap, good quality crude oil in the Middle East and began cultivating strategic partnerships with both Iraq and Iran accordingly. The establishment of strong bilateral ties between the French and Iraqi governments in 1967 coincided with several oil concessions being granted to a French firm, Elf Aquitaine, and an Iraqi military programme to acquire new Western arms in the aftermath of the Six-Day War. A delegation from the Iraqi Armed Forces first visited Paris around December 1967, and was followed by a second led personally by General Abdul Rahman Arif in February 1968. The Iraqis apparently placed orders for 75 AML armoured cars during both visits. Both orders resulted in a total of 106 AML-60s and 40 AML-90s being acquired by Iraq. These sales were perceived by the French government as a practical manifestation of its new Middle Eastern policies and an opportunity for cultivating more interest in new oil and other commercial deals France hoped to sign with Iraq. The decision to transfer AMLs to Iraq was, much like the similar sale to Saudi Arabia, vilified by the French domestic press as a violation of a voluntary arms embargo imposed on the Middle East. In both cases, the French government maintained that the embargo excluded only arms with "clear offensive characteristics", such as tanks or fighter aircraft.

Following the July 17 Revolution, the Ba'ath Party assumed power in Iraq and turned to the Soviet Union as its principal supplier of arms. Between 1968 and 1970 the Iraqi Army underwent a second major rearmament programme with Soviet assistance. However, the Soviet government used this relationship to exert political pressure on the Ba'athist regime. Iraqi officials also believed the Soviets were withholding their most sophisticated weapons from export and therefore embarked on a diversification effort to find secondary suppliers of arms, preferably in the West. In 1972 the Ba'ath Party repaid France for not opposing its nationalisation of Iraqi oil by placing an order for some AML-90s. Estimates of the number initially sold and delivered to Iraq vary from 8 to 38; however, it is clear that this largely symbolic purchase was instrumental in re-igniting defence ties with France. In 1974 the Iraqis placed a second order for another 20 AML-60s and 42 AML-90s, and subsequently for 2 AML-60s and 25 AML-90s. Most of the orders were small and timed to coincide with Iraqi requests for access to far more advanced French defence technology, but they rapidly accumulated; Panhard recorded the sale of 131 AML-60s and 101 AML-90s to Iraq between 1972 and 1980.

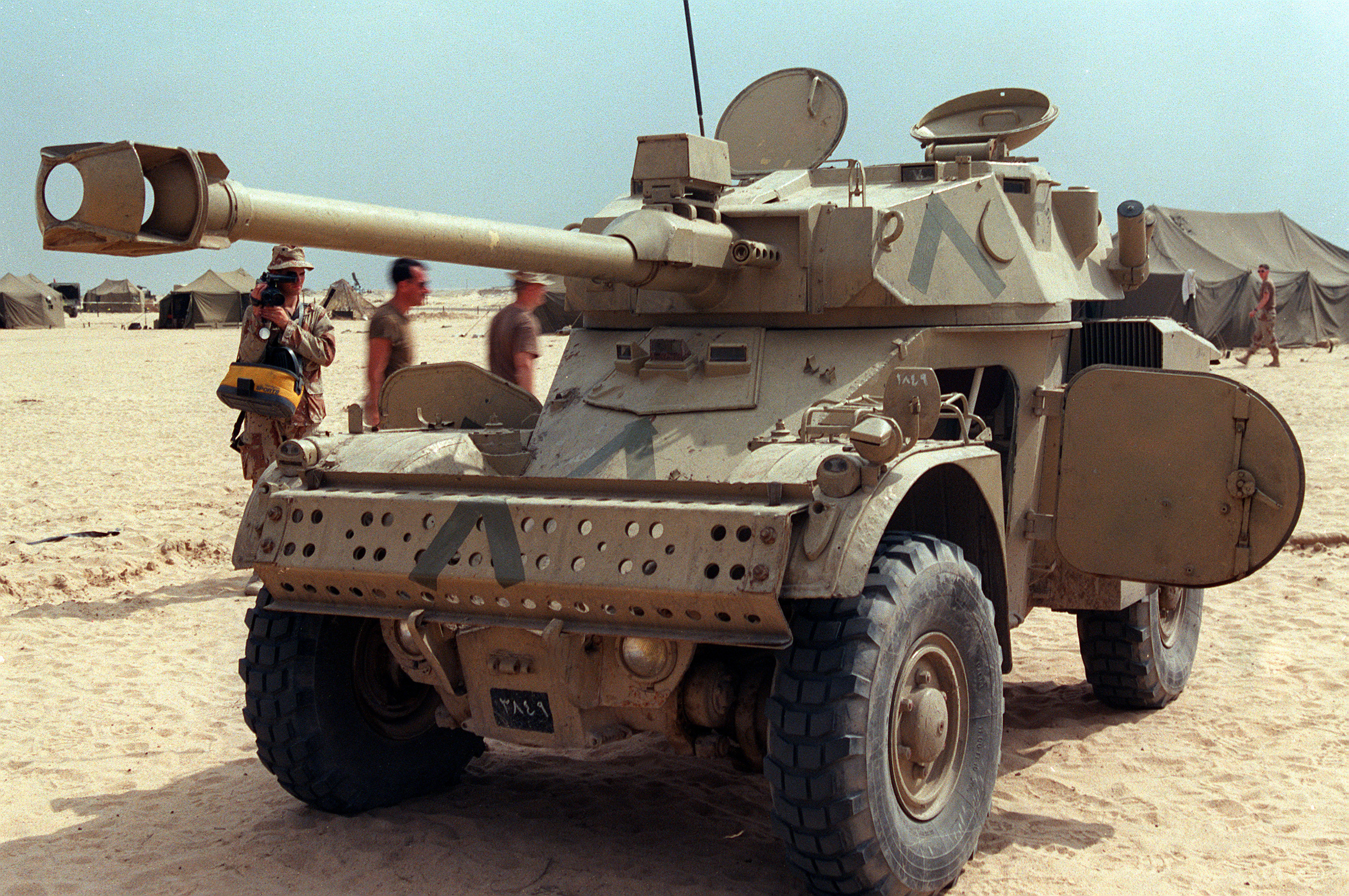
Iraqi AML-90 abandoned during Operation Desert Storm.

In Iraqi service, AML platoons were typically attached at the brigade or battalion level and utilised for their traditional role of reconnaissance. A single Iraqi armoured reconnaissance platoon may have consisted of up to 8 AMLs. Each Iraqi Army corps and infantry division also had its own reconnaissance battalion with 46 AMLs and BRDM-2 scout cars divided into two companies. Most conventional reconnaissance duties were carried out by the AML-90s, which were valued for the size and range of their armament, while the AML-60s were relegated to secondary battlefield tasks.

Iraqi AMLs first saw action in Khuzestan Province during the 1980 invasion of Iran. Lacking adequate air cover, a number were destroyed by Iranian Bell AH-1 Cobra attack helicopters on September 28 near Bostan. In 1991, AML-90s were deployed again, somewhat ineffectually, against United States Marine Corps and Saudi National Guard troops during the Battle of Khafji. Their appearance at Khafji may have led to some initial confusion, since the armoured cars were also operated by the Saudis. Many Iraqi crews failed to take advantage of their vehicles' mobility and engaged the coalition forces from static positions until they were wiped out by artillery. During the Liberation of Kuwait and the subsequent coalition counter-offensive, air superiority was the deciding factor in most reconnaissance operations. The US made use of scout helicopters armed with BGM-71 TOW missiles, which frequently obliterated Iraqi AMLs at long range before they could observe or harass allied ground forces. Others were destroyed on the ground during the first day of the coalition thrust into Kuwait, namely by US M1 Abrams tanks.

The US estimated that the Iraqi Army was operating 300 AMLs in 1990. Iraq lost about half its armoured reconnaissance vehicles during the Gulf War. A small number of AML-90s and AML-60s remained in service, although they were increasingly threatened by erratic maintenance and lack of spare parts. When a US-led coalition invaded Iraq in 2003, Iraqi AMLs clashed with a contingent of American tanks attached to 3rd Battalion, 4th Marines as they advanced on Nasiriyah.

==== Egypt ====
Egypt first encountered Israeli AML-90s in the Sinai Peninsula during the Six-Day War, where at least one platoon was deployed against Egyptian T-54 tanks on several occasions. Some were captured by the defending Egyptian forces during the Israeli campaign, with individual examples being pressed into service. Their performance sufficiently impressed the Egyptian Army that it later issued its own requirement for an armoured car with a turret-mounted 90 mm gun, preferably firing discarding sabot projectiles for improved anti-tank purposes. Bids were accepted from six European contractors (including Panhard), for the programme, although it is unclear what vehicle was adopted.

=== Argentina ===
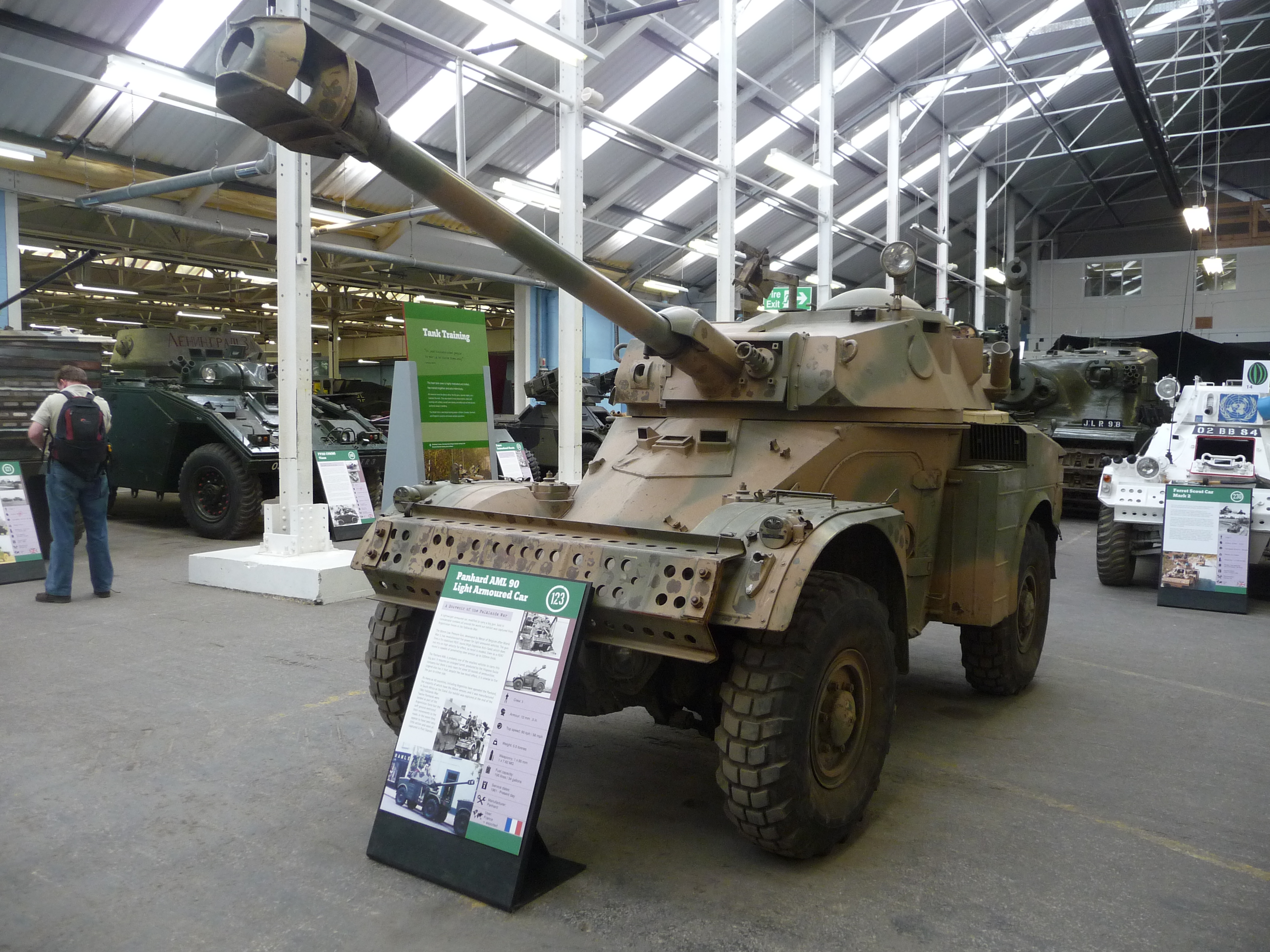
Captured Argentine AML-90 on display at Bovington Tank Museum

In the lead-up to the Falklands War, Argentine commanders considered that the often extremely boggy off-road conditions in the islands were unsuitable for all of the armoured vehicles available to them. Consequently, Argentine AMX-13-105 tanks were not deployed. For on-road operations, 12 AML-90s from Escuadron de Exploracion Caballeria Blindada 181 (181st Armoured Cavalry Reconnaissance Squadron) and an unknown additional number from Escuadron de Exploracion Caballeria Blindada 10 were stationed near Port Stanley.

While some Panhard crews reportedly took part in the Battle of Wireless Ridge, they appear to have fought dismounted, as makeshift infantry. There is no evidence that the Panhards themselves fired a shot in anger (let alone encountering UK FV101 Scorpions or FV107 Scimitars). The Panhards were captured in Stanley after the general surrender of Argentinian forces.

=== El Salvador ===
In the Salvadoran Civil War, at least one AML-90 was destroyed by FMLN insurgents with rifle grenades and an M67 recoilless rifle.

=== Sub-Saharan Africa ===
In 1987, during the Toyota War, FANT's use of swift wheeled vehicles, including AML-90s, allowed Chadian forces to break through combined arms formations and cause severe damage before the slower Libyan tanks could track or engage their targets. The Panhards, deployed in concert with MILAN missile teams at strategic hill junctures, frequently ambushed T-55s at a range of under three hundred metres.

In mid-December 2010, AMLs manned by Laurent Gbagbo's supporters were used to intimidate Ivorian civilians in Abidjan and the western countryside.

The Ecole de Formation et d'Application des Troupes Blindées, at Mbanza-Ngungu in the Democratic Republic of the Congo, was originally established by French Military Cooperation Mission to instruct African AML crews. Today, the academy can host 70 trainees; ten African armies are currently participating in the program.

== Variants ==
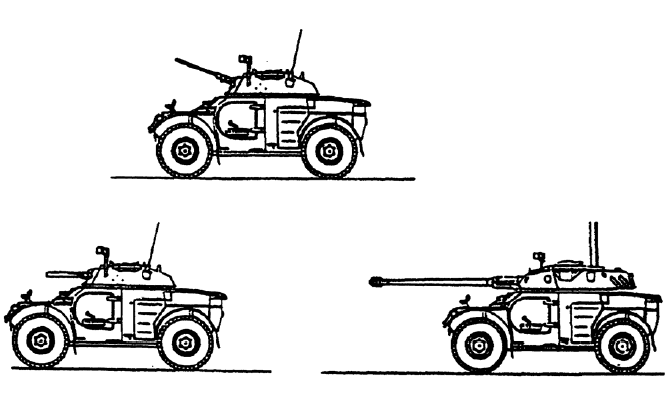
AML variants on a U.S. military recognition plate. From left to right: AML-60 (HE 60-7), AML-20 (H-20), and AML-90 (H-90)

=== AML-60 ===
Known more formally as the AML HE 60-7, or by its manufacturer's code AML-245B, the AML-60 was Panhard's initial production model and included a rounded turret with twin 7.62mm machine guns on the left and a breech-loaded 60 mm (2.36 in.) mortar on the right, with 3,800 stored rounds of 7.62mm ammunition and 43 to 53 mortar projectiles, respectively. The mortar can still be muzzle loaded from outside the vehicle, but is unique in its opening breech locked by a falling block much like direct fire artillery. It has an elevation of +80° and a depression of −15°. Two types of mortars are available: a Hotchkiss-Brandt CM60A1 or, in later production models, a Cloche Spéciale (CS) 60 designed by the French government's Direction technique des armements terrestres (DTAT). The ergonomic dimensions of the CS 60's ammunition allow ten more mortar bombs to carried for a total of 53, as opposed to the CM60A1's 43. Both can be fired on a flat trajectory and are effective at no more than 300 m (980 ft) in the direct role, or 1.7 km (1.1 mi) in the indirect role. Separate combat and command variants of the AML HE 60-7 turrets were manufactured, the latter being fitted with additional radio equipment and therefore possessing comparatively limited stowage. The number of stored ammunition is reduced to 32 mortar bombs and 3,200 7.62mm rounds, respectively.

An AML-60's crew commander acquires targets, directs the gunner, and makes a series of ranging and ordnance calculations to ascertain firing angles. Sighting is optical, and carried out through an M112/3 combined monocular telescope and binocular periscope. Elevation aiming control is linked to the mortar but provision made for manual scanning. In late production models, the micrometre markings on the sights could be illuminated for night firing.

=== AML 60-20 ===
Known as the AML HE 60-20, the AML 60-20 replaced both co-axial 7.62mm machine guns with an M621 20 mm autocannon with 500 stored rounds. The 20 mm autocannon was based on the MG 151 and has an elevation of +50° and a depression of −8°, allowing it to engage low-flying aircraft as necessary. It fires both armour-piercing and high-explosive rounds with a muzzle velocity of 1,040 m/s (3,400 ft/s). An optional 7.62mm pintle-mounted machine gun can be mounted on the turret roof as necessary, although only 1,000 rounds of ammunition may be stored.

=== AML 60-20 Serval ===
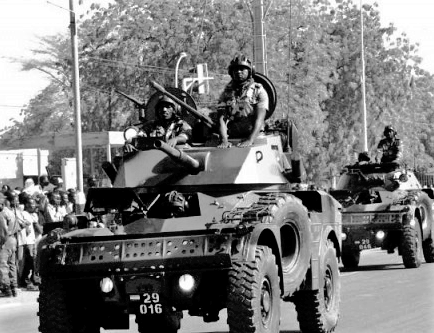
Panhard AML 60-20 Serval of the Niger Armed Forces on parade. Note the lack of any co-axial armament on the turret face.

The AML-60-20 Serval mated an AML-60 chassis to the much larger and more sophisticated Serval turret designed by Hispano-Suiza CNMP, with considerable improvements to the firepower, sights, and ammunition stowage of the original AML 60-20 concept. Two types of 20 mm autocannon were offered: the M693, or the Oerlikon KAD B-16 (Hispano-Suiza HS.820). The original CS DTAT or CM60A1 mortars were replaced by the long-barelled Brandt 60 mm LR gun-mortar, which more than doubled the range of the main armament. The Brandt LR also fired a unique armour-piercing projectile. Due to interior space taken up by the larger mortar, the autocannon and a 7.62mm machine gun were shifted to a new position at the rear of the turret.

AML 60-20 Servals were the first AML-60 variants to be fitted with an electrical fire-control system developed specifically for gun-mortars. The apparatus consisted of two separate control units, one for the gunner and commander, and a new rangefinder. It also included an inclinometer and was designed to allow the main armament to be fired while the AML was parked on sloping ground, without compromising accuracy. A gunner could make the appropriate corrections to bearing aim, based on the altitude according to the horizontal.

=== AML 60-12 ===
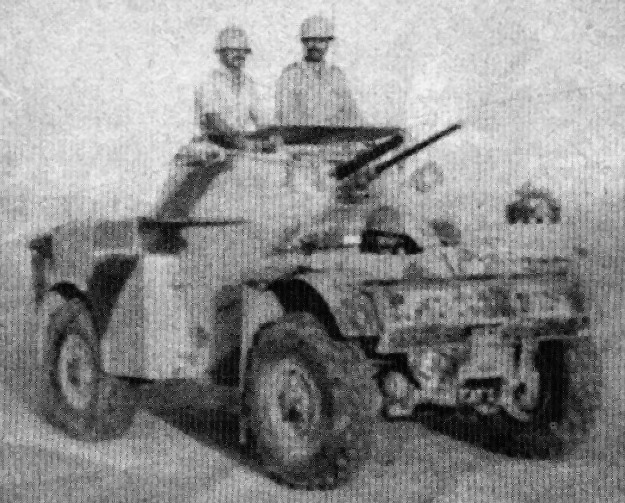
AML 60-12 in Iraq, late 1970s.

Known as the AML HE 60-12, the AML 60-12 was identical in every manner to the AML 60-20 but replaced the 20 mm autocannon with a single 12.7mm heavy machine gun. Its turret had an ammunition capacity of 1,200 rounds of 12.7mm in 12 boxes of 100 rounds and 41 rounds of 60 mm.

=== AML-90 ===
Formally known as the AML H-90, or by its manufacturer's code AML-245C, the AML-90 was designed for carrying out rearguard duties and substituting for the heavier tanks and armoured fighting vehicles deployed in a more linear fashion at the front. Its major feature was its DEFA low-pressure 90 mm rifled gun, which permitted the anti-tank and reconnaissance elements of French territorial units to be combined into a new component capable of knocking out the heaviest vehicle likely to be ranged against it, the Soviet ASU-57 and ASU-85. This was a direct response to Soviet airborne doctrine—Moscow's tacticians then attached great significance to the deployment of paratroopers, with their own artillery and armour, deep behind enemy lines.

The DEFA D921 was the first 90 mm low-pressure gun to be mass-produced in France. It was specifically designed for vehicles weighing under ten tonnes in mind, and the successful mating of such a large calibre weapon on the five tonne AML chassis was then considered a major engineering achievement. This made an AML-90 exceptionally well-armed in proportion to its weight, and offered the advantage of easier recoil loads over conventional tank cannon. The weapon was developed by the Etablissement d'Etudes et de Fabrications d'Armement de Bourges (EFAB) in the 1950s and partly modelled after the Mecar series of lightweight 90 mm KEnerga guns from Belgium. Unlike the Belgian guns however, the DEFA D921 lacked a smoothbore barrel, instead utilising shallow rifling with a rather slow twist to impart a low rate of spin to the discharging projectile. Its ammunition was also fin-stabilised, but improved on the Mecar ammunition by incorporating the fins as a direct extension of the individual shell, making it much shorter.

As mounted on the AML-90, the D921 has an elevation of +15° and a depression of −8°. It is provided with a co-axial 7.62mm machine gun to the left of the main armament. The turret is traversed by rotating the gunner's handwheels, which are not power assisted. Cranking the turret through a full 360° takes approximately twenty-five seconds. A total of 20 90 mm shells and 2,400 rounds of machine gun ammunition are carried. The 90 mm high-explosive anti-tank round possesses a muzzle velocity of 750 m/s (2,500 ft/s) and will penetrate 320 mm (13 in) of armour at an incidence of 0°, or 120 mm (4.7 in) of armour at 60°. The high-explosive round has a muzzle velocity of 650 m/s (2,100 ft/s). These rather low velocity performances, although suitable for close combat, make hit probability poor at extended ranges and proved to be a serious handicap when fighting tanks. Combat experience during the South African Border War and the Six-Day War proved that the AML was decisively outranged by both the T-34/85 and the M48 Patton, respectively. Its rather austere fire control, with optical ranging based on the crew commander's estimates, was also problematic. The vehicle is unable to fire on the move, since its transmission cannot absorb the recoil of such a large gun while in forward motion and suffers excessive wear as a result. Nevertheless, during at least three conflicts the AML proved capable of knocking out main battle tanks, often by attacking from the flank or rear. The heaviest armour destroyed by an AML-90 was likely a Libyan T-62 during the Toyota War, in March 1988.

The D921 recoils approximately 58 cm and is then returned to the firing position by a hydropneumatic recuperator. It is fitted with a double-baffle muzzle brake which reduces the magnitude of the firing impulses and consequently, the average recoil forces. However, the deflection of propellant gases rearward and the resulting overpressure may cause whiplash to the crew. During runout the breech is opened and an empty shell casing ejected; the breech then remains open for reloading.

=== AML-90 Lynx ===
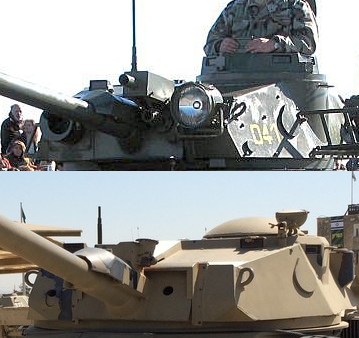
Top: Lynx 90 turret incorporating a new commander's cupola, sights, searchlight, and a laser rangefinder. Bottom: Original H-90 turret.

Also known as the AML D-90 Lynx, the AML-90 Lynx was a heavily upgraded and modernised AML-90 fitted with a sophisticated turret and ranging system. Like the H-90, the D-90 Lynx turret mounted the same D921 90 mm gun on the right and a co-axial 7.62mm machine gun on the left. The main armament now had an improved elevation gear and could be elevated from −8° to +35°. Other modifications included the replacement of the unlit optical sights with TJN2-90 combined day/night sights. The new sights were designed around a light intensifier tube with automatic gain control to enable sighting in the darkness without the need for artificial illumination, and had a range of nearly 2 km (1.2 mi). They could be fitted with additional features such as slope compensation or tachometry facilities. A menagerie of other sights and sighting equipment were also offered with the AML-90 Lynx for export customers, including the same CANASTA night sights package and electronics suite as fitted to the AMX-10RC. The CANASTA system included a low-light television camera and display units for the AML's gunner and commander, along with a moving electronic reticle with sight angle corrections. This somewhat compensated for low hit probability from the first 90 mm round at long range, allowing for the automatic engagement of moving targets.

One of the defining characteristics of the AML-90 Lynx was the large searchlight mounted co-axially with its 90 mm gun, a domed commander's cupola with vision blocks reminiscent of the Eland Mk7, and a boxlike laser rangefinder on the gun mantlet. Two types of French laser rangefinders were available as standard, although several foreign designs such as the Avimo LV3 could also be fitted: the TCV 107 and the TCV 29. Both rangefinders automatically calculate the range to target and feed this information to the crew commander, eliminating the need for rough estimation as before.

AML-90 Lynxes were offered with a variety of new power plants, namely a Peugeot XD 3T diesel engine developing 71 kW (95 hp) for an extended range of 1,000 km (620 mi). In 1979, one AML-90 Lynx prototype was showcased with a Mercedes-Benz OM617 developing 86 kW (115 hp) but it remains unclear if this model entered production. The armament as fitted to the D-90 Lynx turret could be also configured greatly, including the modification of the D921 gun to fire APFSDS ammunition with a muzzle velocity of 1,350 m/s (4,400 ft/s), or its replacement with the considerably more powerful Cockerill Mk. III medium pressure 90 mm gun as mounted on the EE-9 Cascavel. Many of these turrets were equipped with hydraulic traverse, eliminating the necessity for manual operation. Traversing a powered Lynx turret through a full 360° takes less than fifteen seconds.

The first export sales of the AML-90 Lynx were to Burundi, which ordered 12 in 1982. Morocco purchased 20 in 1988, and another 23 were accepted by the Chadian National Armed Forces (FANT) as military aid during the final stage of the Chadian–Libyan conflict. Small quantities were also donated by the French government to Senegal, Togo, and Guinea. An undisclosed number of Lebanese and Kenyan AML-90s have been upgraded with Lynx turrets as well.

=== AML S530 ===
Designed as a self-propelled anti-aircraft weapon, the AML S530 was developed solely for export and is operated by the Venezuelan Army. It carries twin M621 20 mm autocannon, with 600 stored rounds. The autocannons have an elevation of +70° and a depression of −10°. Ranging is optical and carried out by a roof-mounted periscopic sight very similar to that installed on the AML HE 60-7. The sight has been modified for anti-aircraft purposes and has a vertical field of view of 20°. It has a sun filter, a collimator with an adjustable illumination feature for night firing, an adjustable display lead for tracking fast or slow moving targets and aircraft either flying horizontally or diving, and automatic fire range estimation effective up to 1.3 km (0.81 mi). More specialised anti-aircraft sights, as well as sights designed solely for engaging ground targets, could also be installed when necessary. Both 20 mm guns are equipped with an ammunition feed mechanism storing 260 rounds each. They can fired either on semi-automatic, fully automatic, or in short bursts, with a cyclic rate of fire of 750 rounds per minute per barrel. One barrel may also be selected at a time. The ammunition feed is housed in the turret's elevating module, and fed from an ammunition bin in the turret basket. The 20 mm armour-piercing round possesses a muzzle velocity of 1,000 m/s and will penetrate 23 mm of armour at an incidence of 0°. The high explosive and incendiary rounds have a muzzle velocity of 1,026 m/s (3,370 ft/s).

An AML S530 prototype was first showcased at Satory in 1971 and twelve were immediately ordered by Venezuela. They were produced and delivered by 1973, but no further export sales followed. A smaller, more rounded variant of the same S530 turret with improved sights was later mounted on an ERC 90 Sagaie chassis for a Gabonese military requirement.

=== AML-20 ===
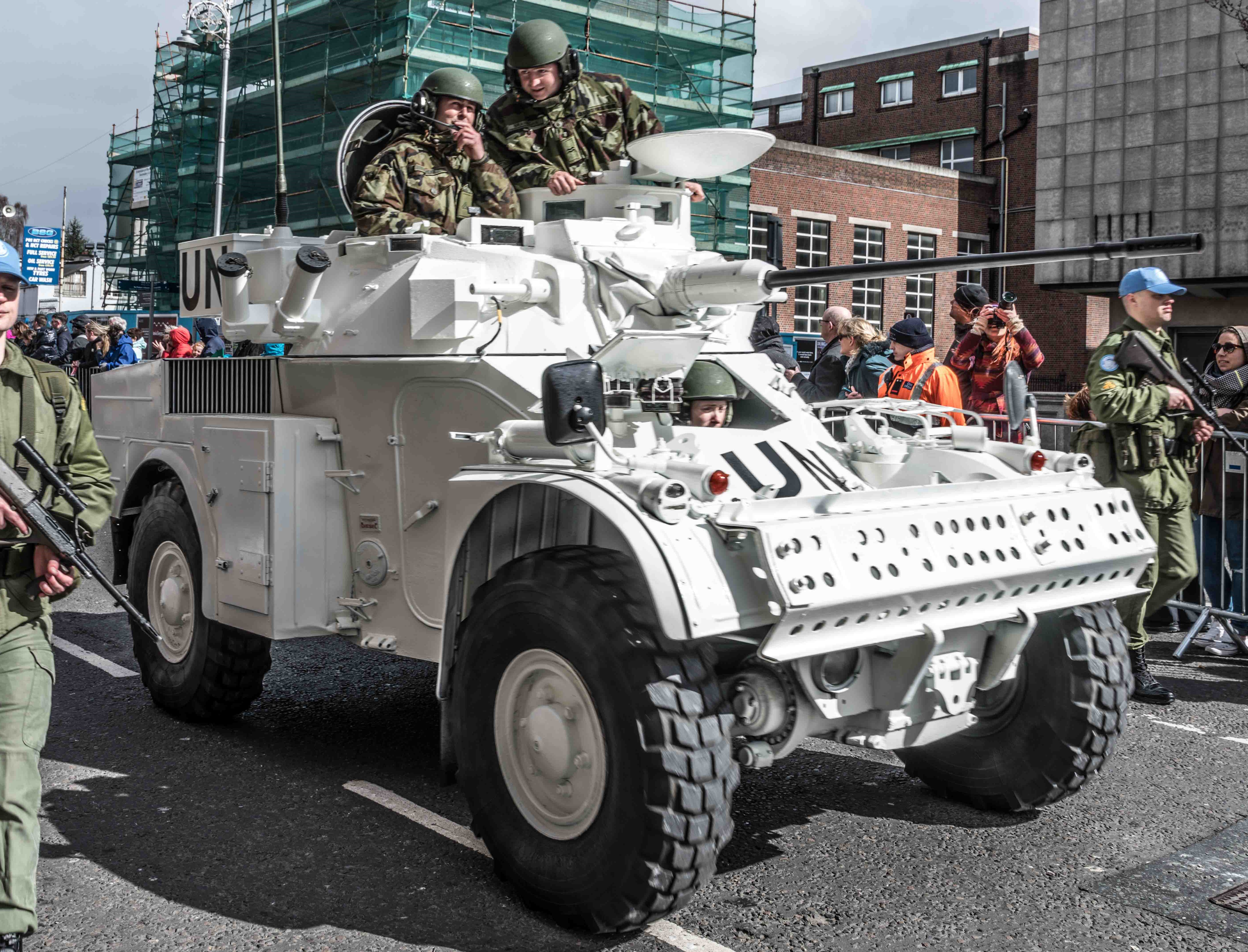
Irish AML-20 with the Denel LCT-20 turret. The armament depicted is a South African copy of the M693, the GI-2.

The AML H-20 had a turret with full power traverse and elevation and was armed with a single 20 mm M693 F2 autocannon; a 7.62mm machine gun was also mounted co-axially with the main armament and a similar weapon could be fitted to the turret roof for anti-aircraft defence. The M693 could be elevated from −8° to +50°. Unlike the M621 mounted on the AML 60-20 and AML S530, this weapon employed cartridges with mechanical priming and was paired to a dual-feed ammunition supply system, allowing more than one type of ammunition to be loaded at once, with gunners being able to switch between the two. It can fire all Hispano-Suiza HS.820 20 mm rounds as well as a specially developed French Type 693 sub-calibre armour-piercing round. The armour-piercing ammunition will kill any other light armoured car at ranges of up to 1 km (0.62 mi), and also damage the sides of an older main battle tank. Like the M621 single shots, limited bursts, or continuous bursts can be fired.

Two separate turrets were offered for the AML-20: the French TL-120 SO by the Societe d'Applications des Machines Motrices (SAMM), and the South African LCT-20 by Denel Land Systems, which was originally designed for the Ratel-20 infantry fighting vehicle. The TL-120 SO turret was open-topped and 1,000 rounds of 20 mm ammunition were carried. It was one of the most well-protected turrets fitted to the AML chassis to date, with a maximum armour plate thickness of 20 mm. This turret was also hydraulically powered and could be rotated through a full 360° in ten seconds or less. The gunner's optical sights were adopted from the AML S530 and a secondary periscope optimised specifically for anti-aircraft purposes also fitted. No sights were provided for the crew commander, leaving the gunner responsible for acquiring targets.

The LCT-20 turret was considerably more sophisticated, incorporating a range of night vision equipment and a laser rangefinder. About 300 rounds of 20 mm and 1,000 rounds of ready use 7.62mm ammunition were carried. The LCT-20 was not open-topped, although for observation purposes there was a domed cupola with four direct observation windows. Denel sights provided for both the gunner and commander were effective up to 4 km (2.5 mi).

=== AML-30 ===
A prototype trialled during early 1970s, the AML H-30 mated an AML-90 chassis and turret to a single 30 mm Hispano-Suiza HS.831 anti-aircraft gun and was the first AML to be offered with powered turret controls. The 30 mm cannon could be fired on semiautomatic, in bursts, or fully automatic. A co-axial 7.62mm machine gun could be mounted to the left of the main armament. Stored ammunition was 200 30 mm rounds, and 2,200 7.62mm rounds for the machine gun.

=== AML NA-2 ===
Due to the increasing obsolescence of low pressure, direct fire weapons in the anti-tank role, Panhard manufactured at least one dedicated anti-tank guided missile carrier variant of the AML-90—the same chassis with its turret removed and replaced by a launching system for four SS.11 or two SS.12/AS.12 missiles. Two 7.62mm machine guns were mounted to the centre of the new system for self-defence.

=== Other variants ===
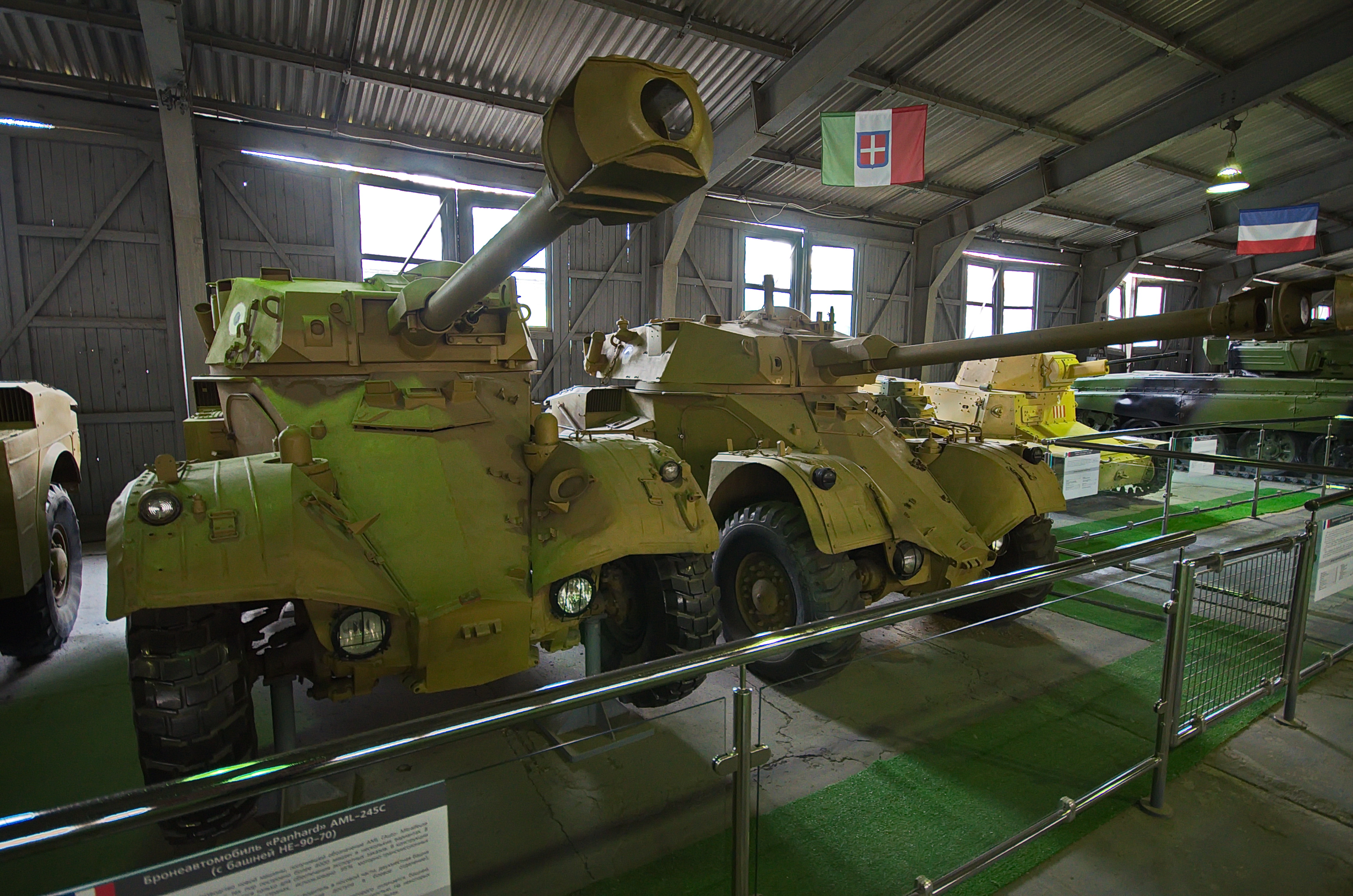
A Panhard AML-90 (left) and an Eland (right) at the Kubinka Tank Museum.

Over a dozen variants of the Panhard AML were developed to meet a wide range of mission requirements, including border patrol, airfield security, light raiding duties, and liaison purposes. At some point Panhard developed four other vehicles for these roles based on the AML chassis but designated them EPF, EPA, ERA, and EPR, respectively. The liaison model, the EPR, was turretless and carried only a ring-mounted 12.7mm heavy machine gun. The ERA marketed for the role of raiding and harassing larger armoured or mechanised forces was similar to the AML-20, but could also carry a mount for six MILAN missiles in place of the 20 mm autocannon. The EPF and EPA carried up to three 7.62mm general-purpose machine guns apiece. Yet another variant, the AML Eclairage, was identical to the AML-20 and ERA.

The AML-30 and AML-90 spawned amphibious models, which bore propellers and form-fitting, watertight boxes over their hulls. These were then inflated with polyurethane, allowing the armoured car to float. The polyurethane lining had the advantage of being self-extinguishing if ignited by flame, and of providing a detonation point for a hollow charge shell before it could reach the armour plate. Amphibious AMLs were propelled through the water at 7 km/h (4.3 mph) and were steered by their front wheels. The amphibious box increased the weight of the chassis by about ten percent.

Individual armies have also retrofitted existing AMLs with new armament adopted from other armoured vehicles, such as the complete turret and 30 mm RARDEN autocannon of the FV107 Scimitar light tank.

The Eland Mk7 is an AML derivative built under licence in South Africa with a number of major modifications. Although the vehicle fulfills a similar role to its Panhard counterpart, it differs both in design and construction. The engine at the rear of the Eland is water-cooled whilst the French vehicle's engine is air-cooled, necessitating a different rear hull. An Eland's hull is also somewhat longer.

Several companies currently offer upgrades or comprehensive rebuild packages for AMLs, particularly with regards to the elderly Panhard Model 4 HD engine, for which spare parts are difficult and expensive to source. Saymar, an Israeli firm, has proposed replacing it with a two-litre Toyota diesel engine developing 76 kW (102 hp). Another extensive AML modernisation programme is being marketed by a subsidiary of the Saudi Military Industries Corporation. Overhauled Saudi AML engines are supported on a horizontal sliding frame, allowing them to be replaced by a trained maintenance team in twenty minutes.

== Operators ==
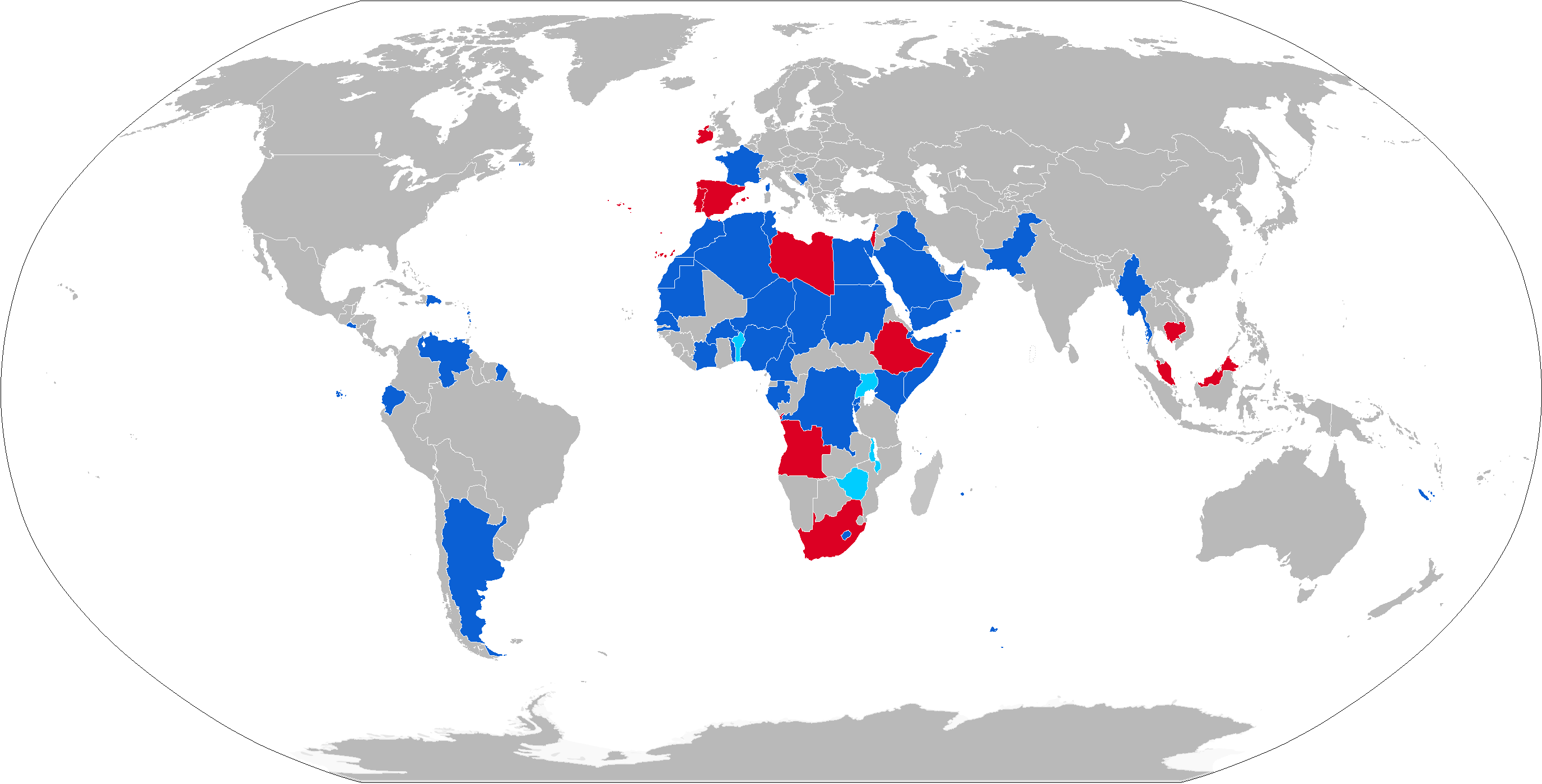
Map of Panhard AML operators in blue, with former operators in red and operators of the related Eland Mk7 in teal

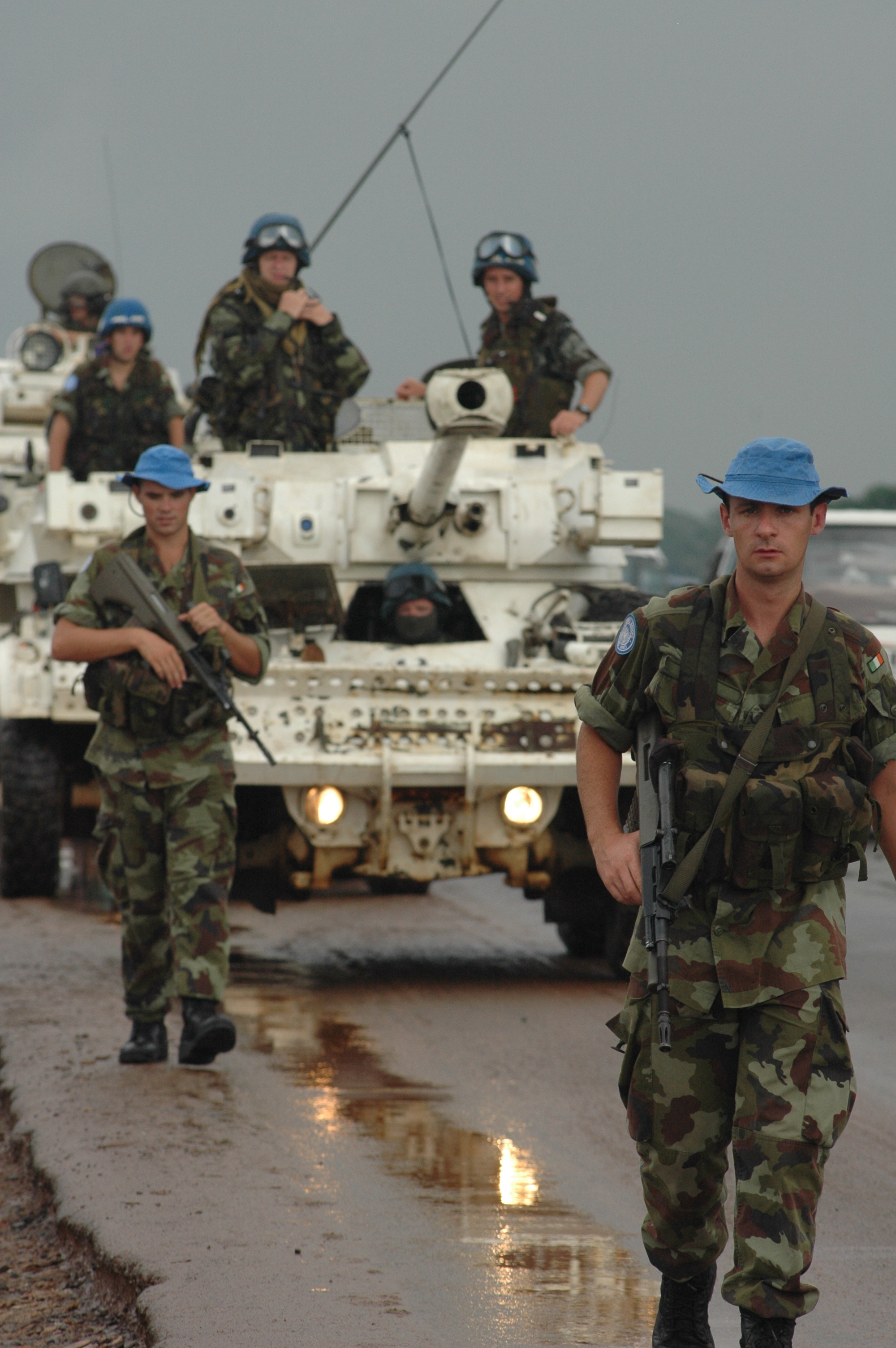
UNMIL peacekeepers on patrol with an AML-90 in Liberia, July 2006.

=== Current operators ===
- Algeria: 54 AML-60 received in 1965. All modernized in 2018.
- Argentina: 50 AML-90 received between 1969-71.
- Bahrain: 22 AML-90 operational in 2024.
- Burkina Faso: 19 AML-60 and AML-90
- Burundi: 6 AML-60 and 12 AML-90. 30 AML-60 and AML-90 received between 1966-83.
- Cameroon: 31 AML-90; ex-Bosnian Army
- Chad: 132 AML-60 and AML-90
- Democratic Republic of the Congo: up to 17 AML-60 and 14 AML-90.
- Djibouti: 4 AML-60 in 2024. Up to 24 were received in 1979.
- Ecuador: 27 AML-60 and AML-90. All modernized in 2018 and 2020.
- El Salvador: 6 AML-90 modernized by 2022. Originally 10 were in service.
- Gabon: 24 AML-60 and AML-90
- Guinea: 2 AML-90 Lynx received in 1990 for use in the Presidential Guard.
- Ivory Coast: 20
- Kenya: 82 AML-60 and AML-90; refurbished by an Israeli firm in 2007.
- Lebanon: 55 AML-90. 74 AML-90 originally in service.
- Lesotho: 4 AML-90
- Myanmar: 50 AML-90
- Mauritania: 39 AML-90 and 20 AML-60
- Morocco: 38 AML-60 and 190 AML-90
- Niger: 35 AML-20 and AML-60 and 90 AML-90 operational as of 2024. 56 AML-60 and AML-90 received between 1983-91.
- Nigeria: 137 Some in service with the Nigerian Armoured Corps in 2024.
- Rwanda: 15
- Sahrawi Republic
- Saudi Arabia: 190 AML-90 and 110 AML-60.
- Somaliland
- Togo: 3 AML-60 and 7 AML-90 in active service as of 2024.
- Tunisia: 40 AML-90 in service as of 2024.
- United Arab Emirates: 49 AML-90 in active service as of 2024.
- Venezuela: 10
- Yemen: 185; 95 operational in 2013.

=== Former operators ===
- Angola: 5 AML-60s inherited from Portugal at Angolan independence.
- Biafra: Some captured from Nigeria.
- Bosnia and Herzegovina: 10 AML-90
- Cambodia: 15 AML-60s in service between 1965 and 1975. Saw service during the Cambodian Civil War.
- Egypt
- Ethiopia 56 AML-60
- France: 905
- People's Republic of Kampuchea: 2 AML-60s in service during the early 1980s.
- Iraq: 300; 10 operational in the mid 2000s.
- Ireland: 32 AML-20, 20 AML-90
- Israel: 29 AML-90
- Libya: 20 AML-90
- Malaysia: 140 AML-60 and AML-90s
- Pakistan: 5 AML 60-12
- Portugal: 50 AML-60
- Senegal: 54 AML-60 and AML-90
- Somalia: Received up to 20 AML-90s from Saudi Arabia in 1984.
- South Africa: 100 AMLs procured in 1962, swiftly replaced by Eland Mk2.
- Spain: 140 AML-60 and AML-90s
- Sudan: 5-6 AML-90
- United Kingdom: 1 AML-90 captured during the Falklands War; used as a workshop vehicle by 2 Field Workshop REME after the conflict.
- Zaire: 155, 95 AML-60 and 60 AML-90

=== Former non-state operators ===
- Al-Mourabitoun: AML-90s inherited from the Lebanese Armed Forces (LAF).
- Amal Movement: AML-90s inherited from the LAF.
- Army of Free Lebanon: AML-90s inherited from the LAF.
- Boko Haram: AML-60 variant; likely captured from Nigeria.
- FLEC: At least 2 AML-60s; likely acquired from Zaire.
- FNLA: 1 AML-90; now on display at the Museu das Forças Armadas, Luanda.
- FNLC: 1 AML-60, some AML-90s.
- Lebanese Arab Army: AML-90s inherited from the LAF.
- Lebanese Forces: 12 AML-90s inherited from the LAF.
- Progressive Socialist Party/ People's Liberation Army (Lebanon): AML-90s inherited from the LAF.
- South Lebanon Army: AML-90s inherited from the LAF.
- Tigers Militia: AML-90s inherited from the LAF.
- UNITA: 4 AMLs acquired clandestinely through Zaire; saw service during the Angolan Civil War.

== In popular culture ==
The Panhard AML has made some major film appearances, most notably in the 1987 British film The Living Daylights, when two Moroccan Army AML-90s were mocked up as Soviet reconnaissance vehicles pursuing Afghan Mujahadeen. These examples included mounted RPK machine guns and communications not dissimilar to those in the BRDM-2.

AMLs were first portrayed in the 1973 French thriller The Day of the Jackal, and 1974 Italian war film While There's War There's Hope, which featured an AML-60 of the Portuguese Armed Forces during the Guinea-Bissau War of Independence.

Two AML-90s stand in for German scout cars serving with the Afrika Korps appear in the 1984 French war film Les Morfalous.

A Moroccan Army AML-90 briefly appears in the 2018 political thriller film Beirut, mocked up as a Lebanese militia armored car passing by outside the main entrance of the Beirut International Airport Passenger Terminal.

== Gallery ==
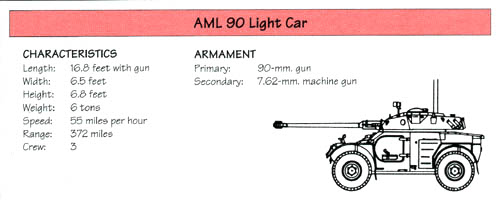
Recognition plate

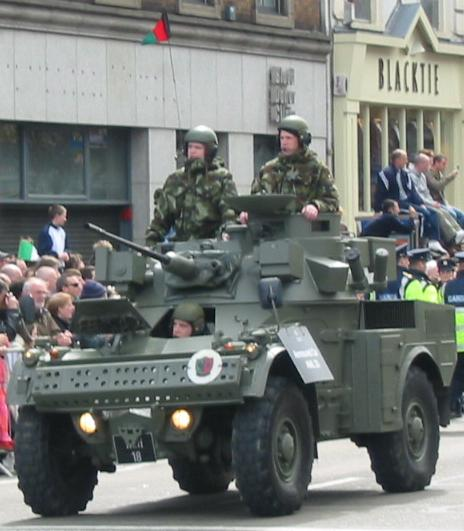

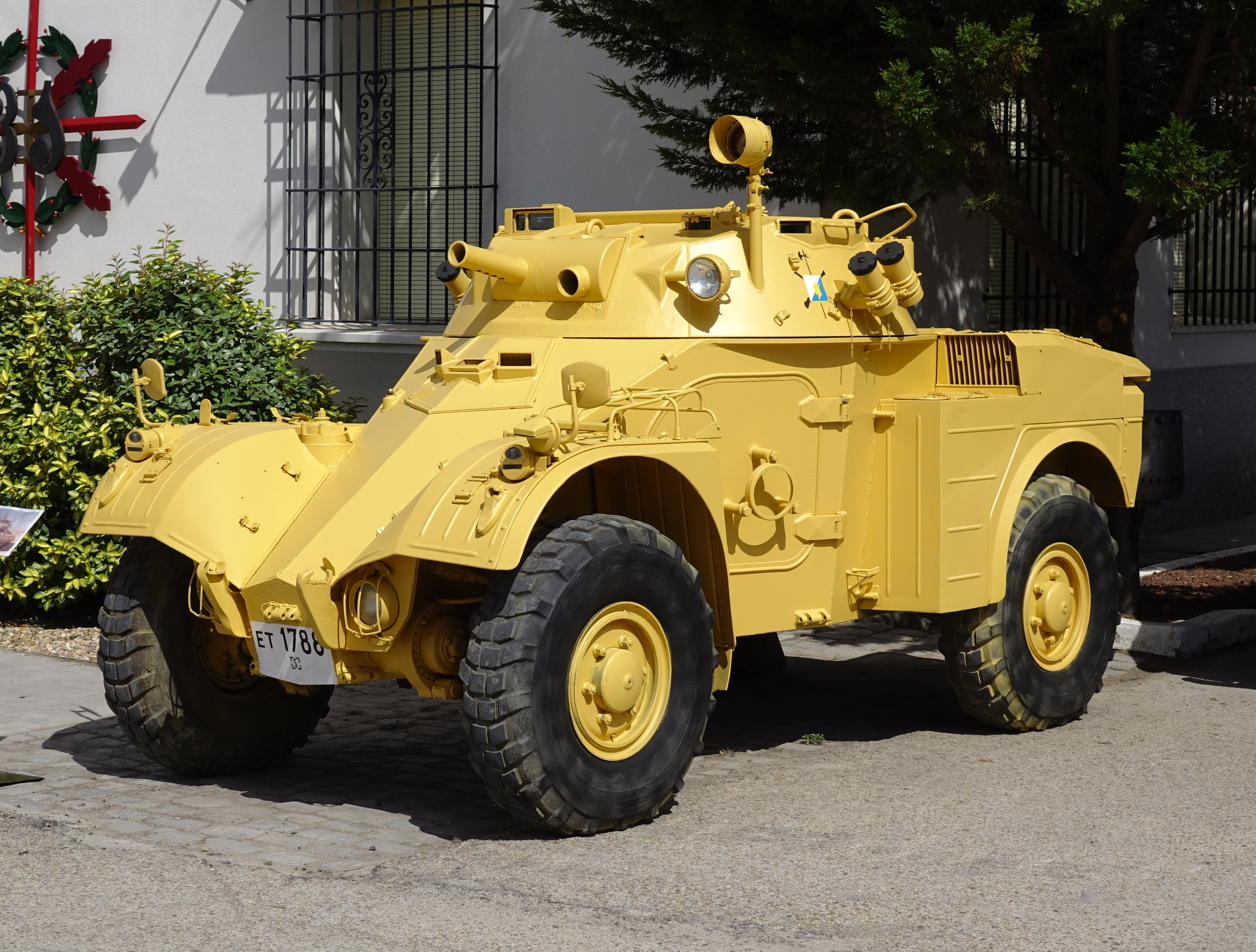

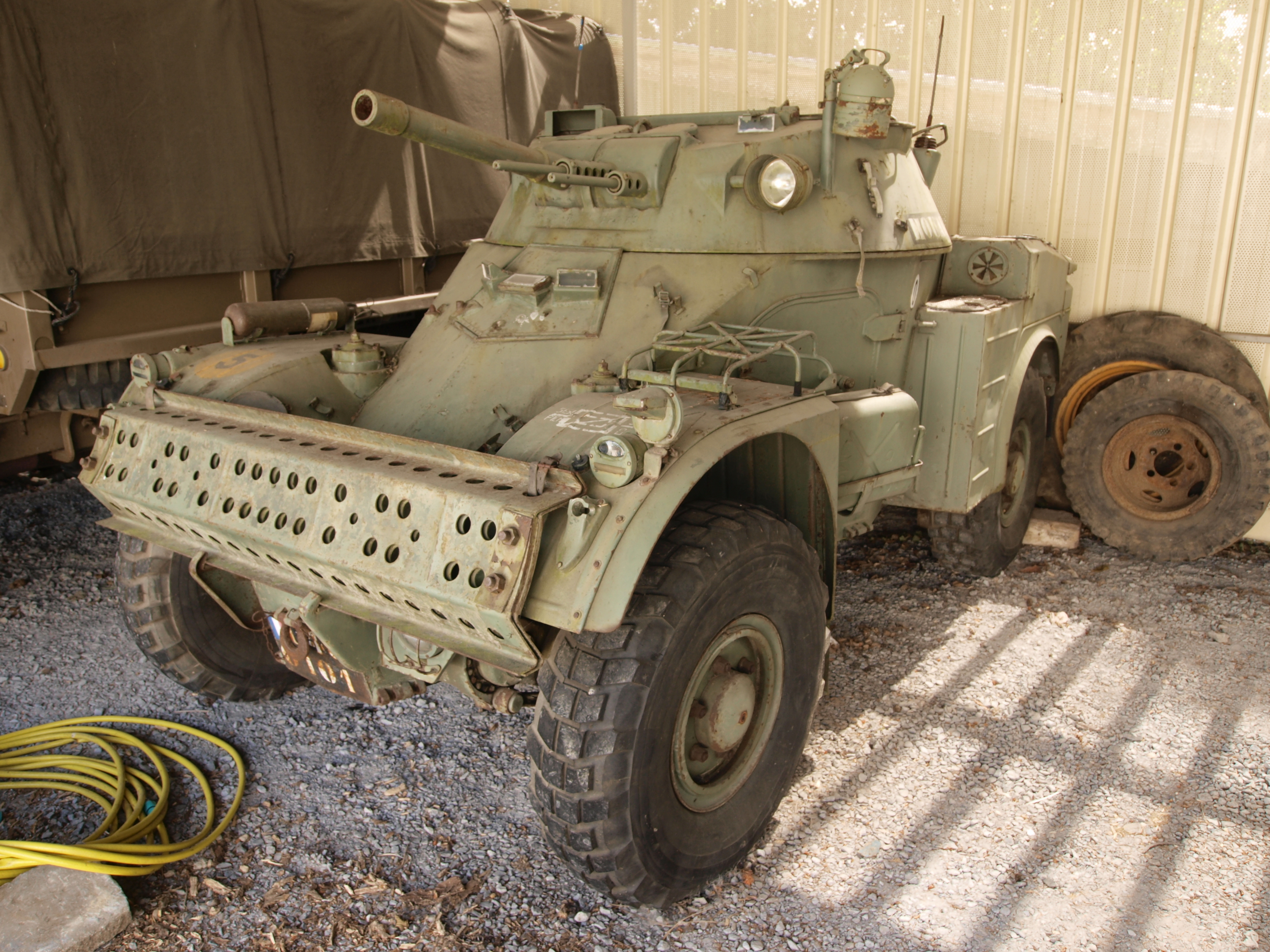

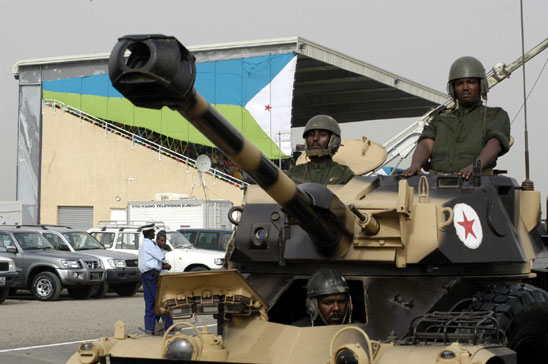

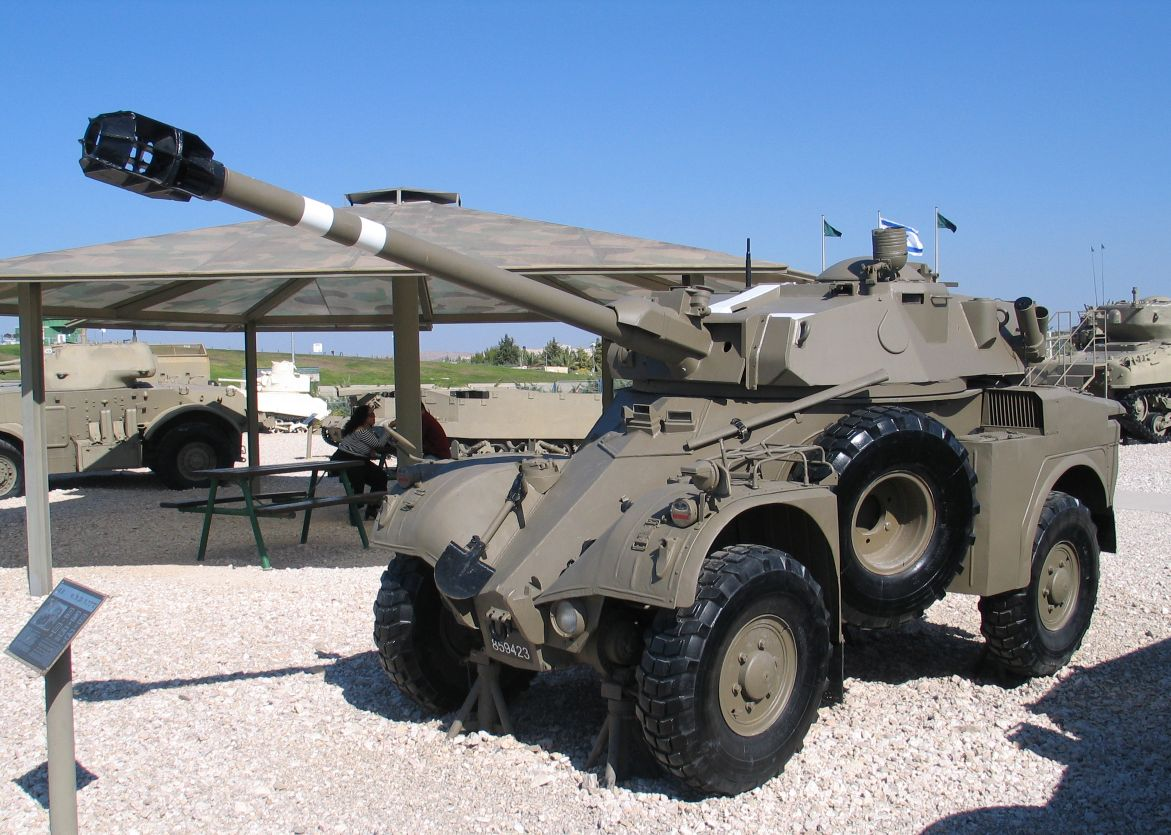

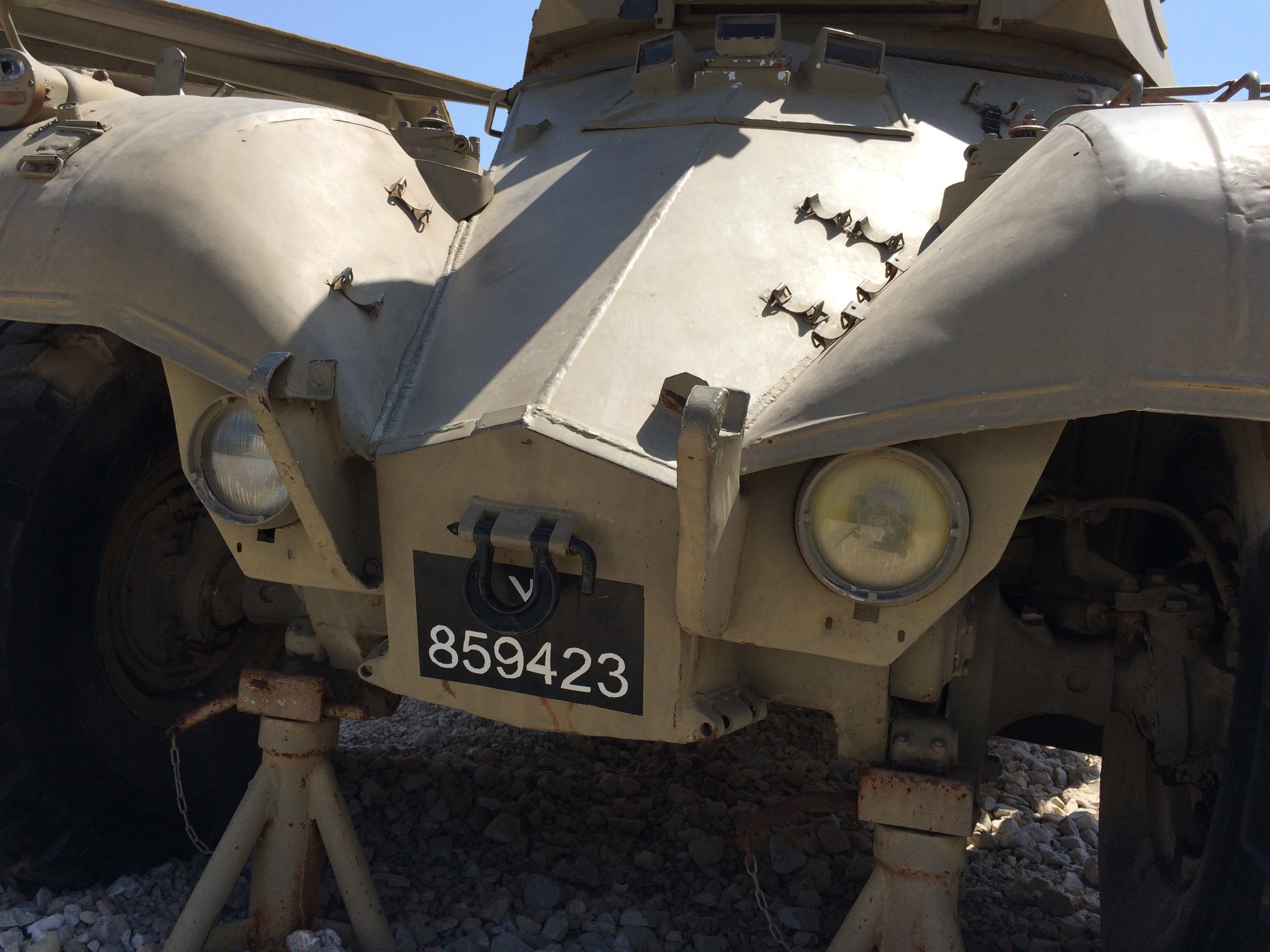
Frontal glacis

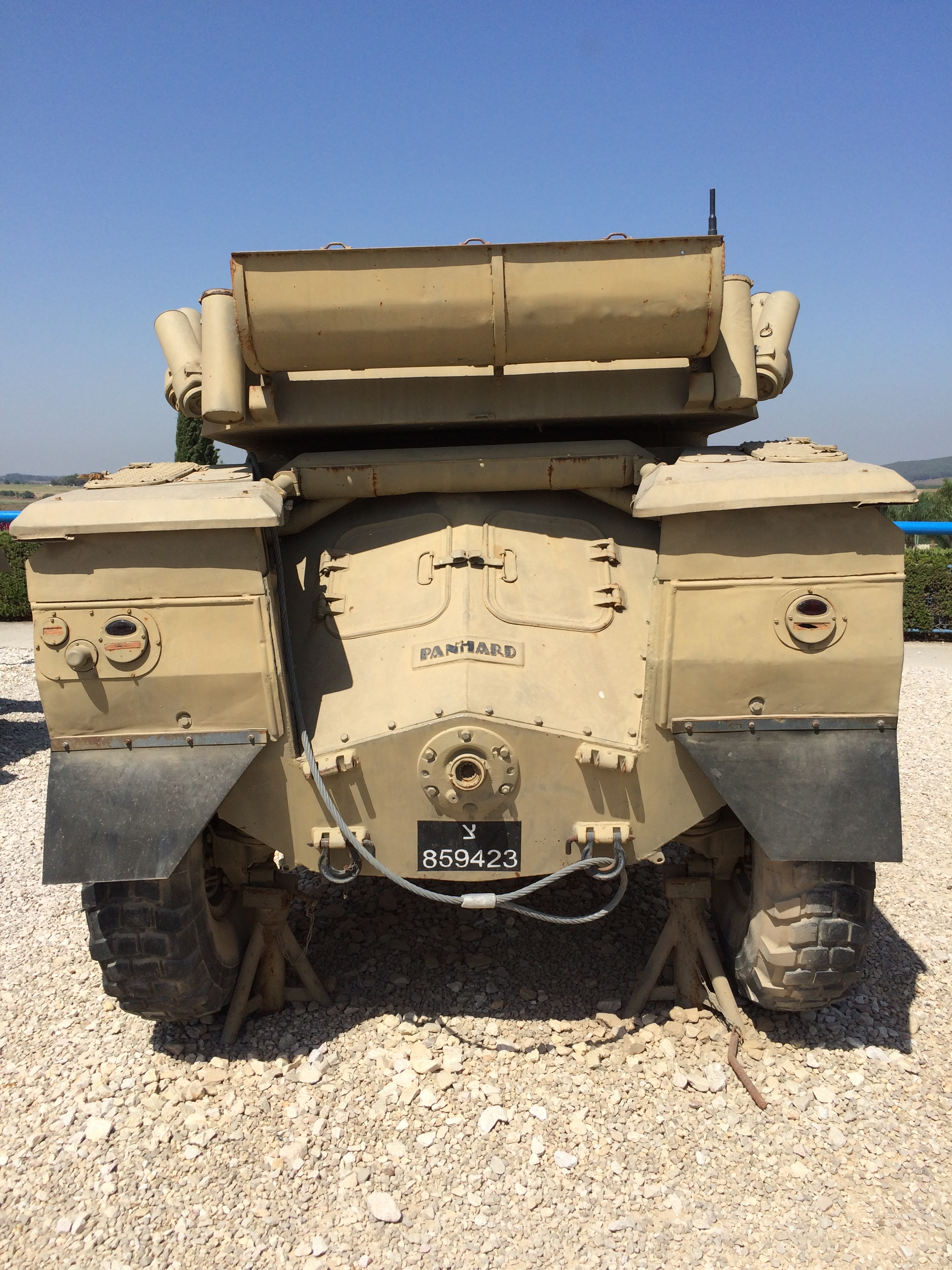
Rear hull, including the enclosed powerplant

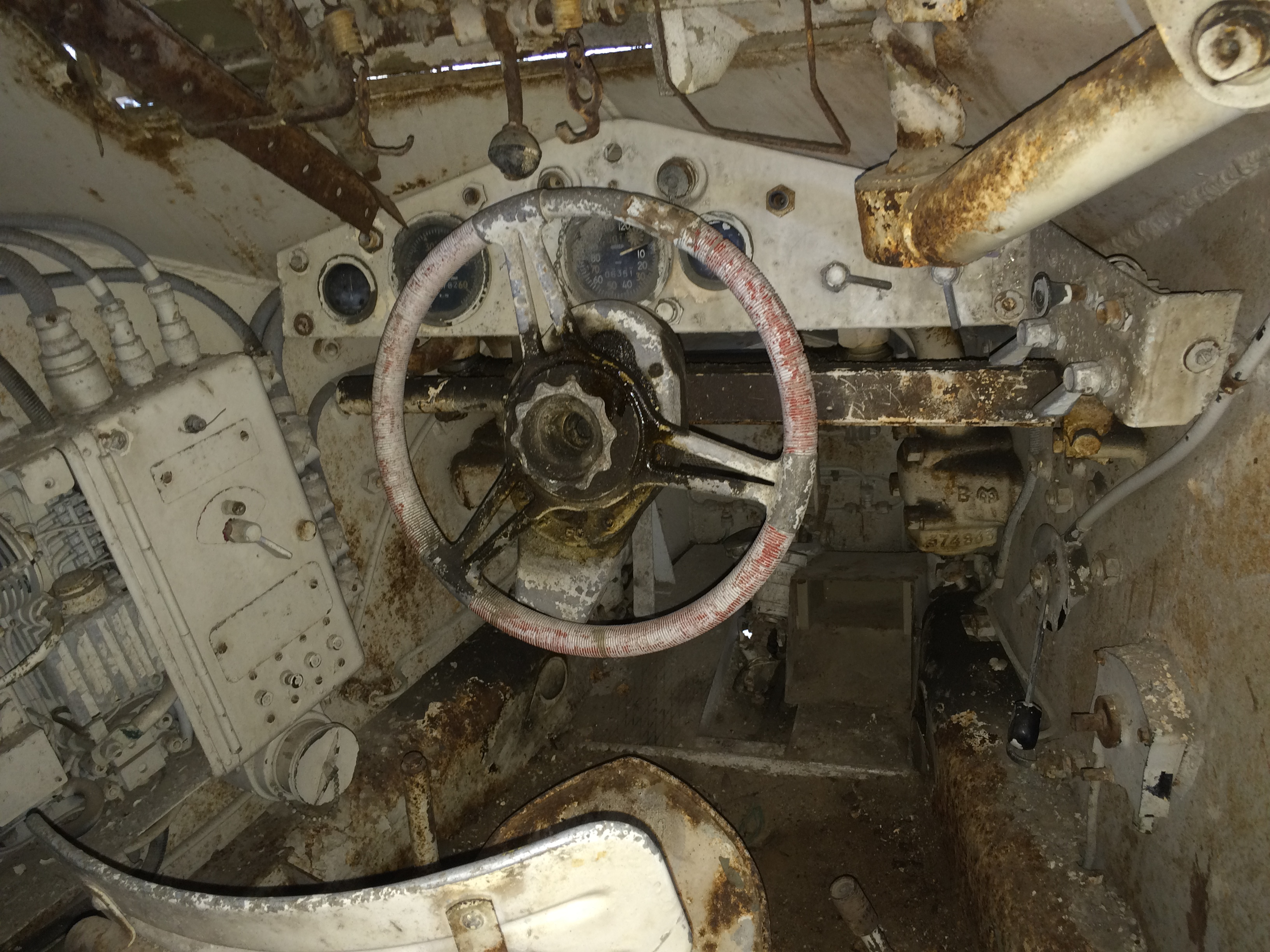
Driving compartment

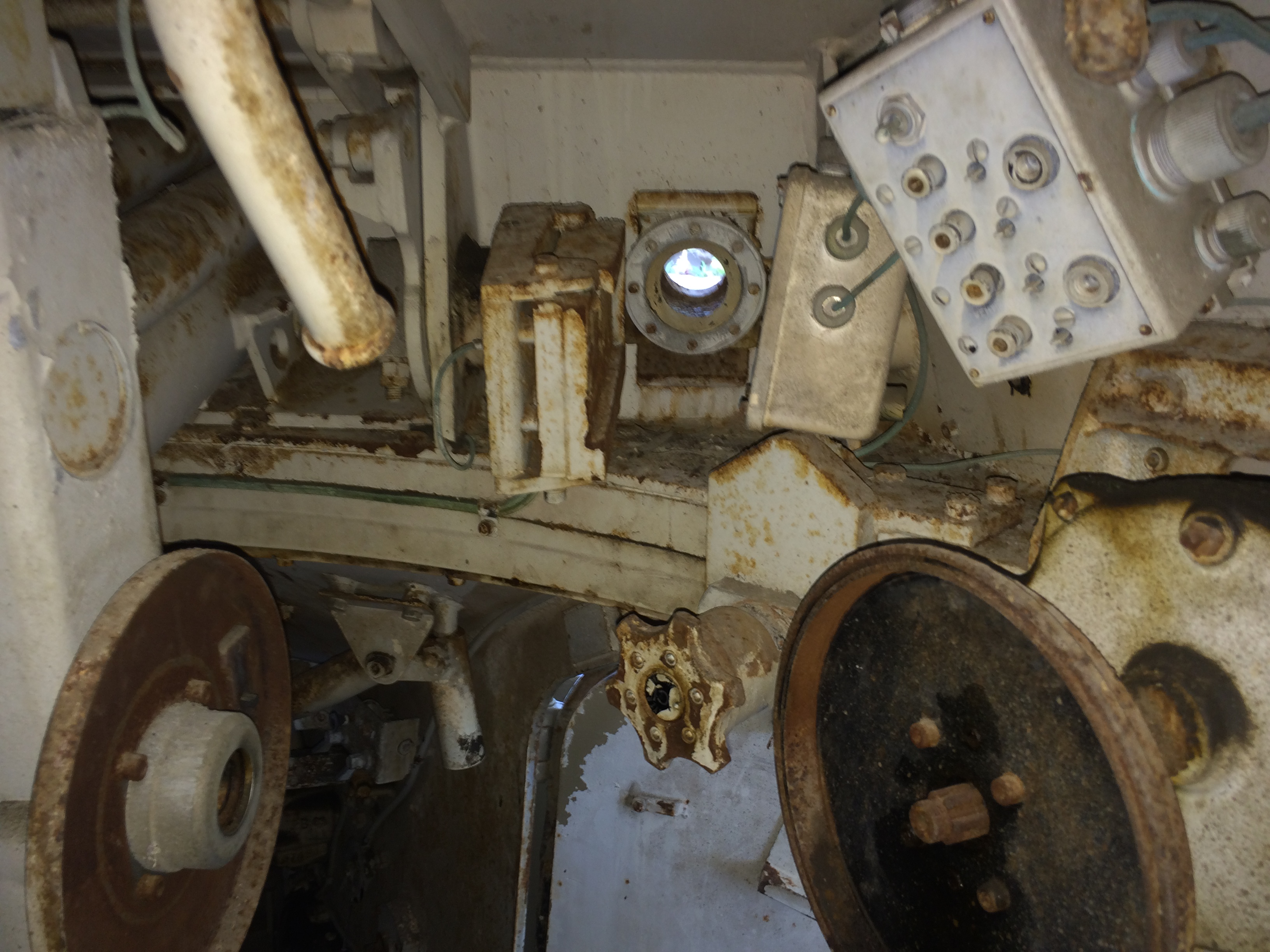
Gunner's fighting position; note manual turret cranks

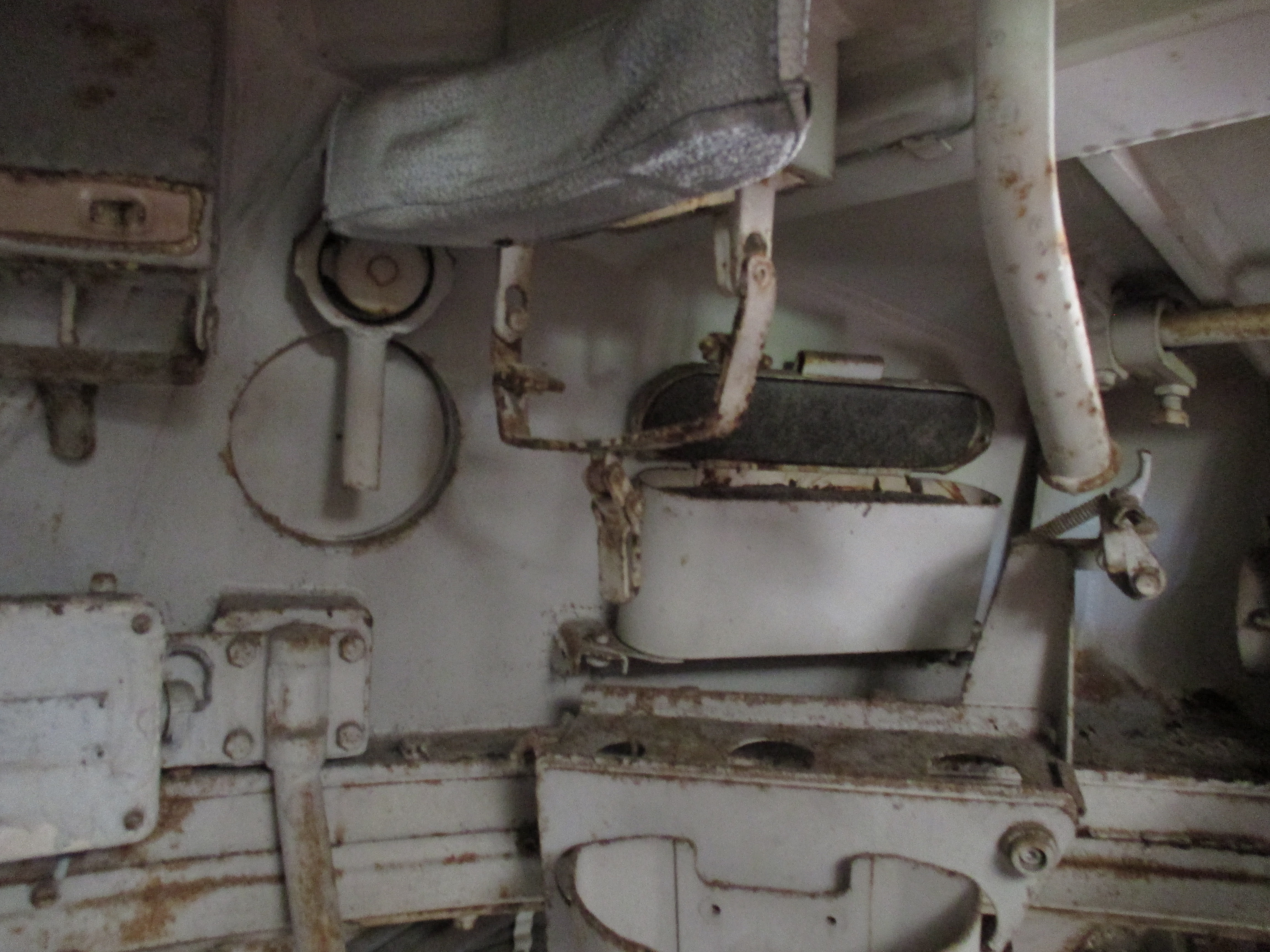
Commander's fighting position; note hatch for ejecting spent casings

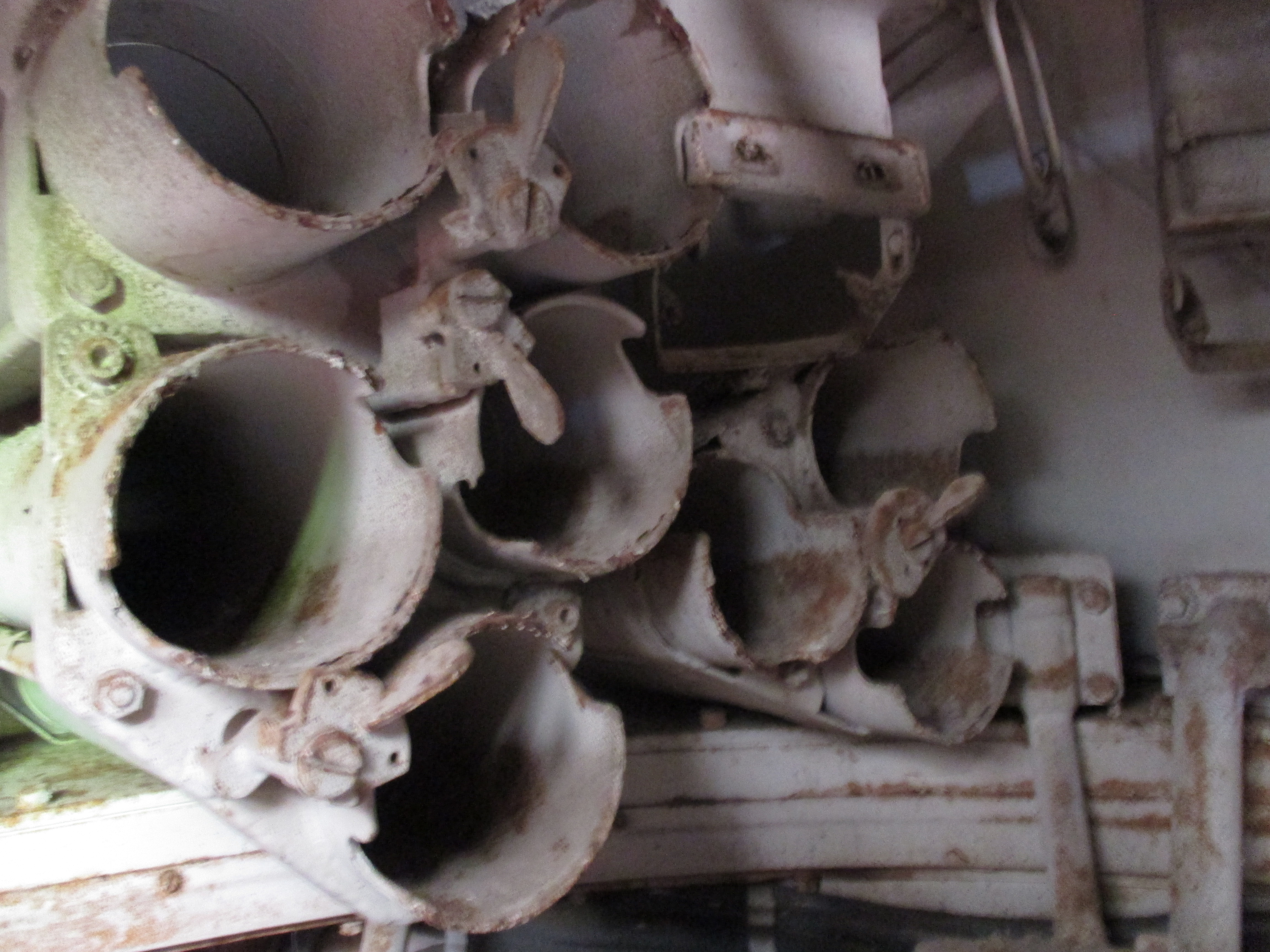
Ammunition rack located in rear of AML turret

== See also ==
=== Panhard series ===
- Eland Mk7 (derivative)
- Panhard EBR
- Panhard M3
- Panhard ERC-90 Sagaie
- Panhard VCR
- Panhard VBL

=== Vehicles of comparable role, performance, and era ===
- Alvis Saladin – (United Kingdom)
- BRDM-2 – (Soviet Union)
- EE-9 Cascavel – (Brazil)
- Eland armoured car – (South Africa)
- Ferret – (United Kingdom)
- Fox – (United Kingdom)
- VBC-90 – (France)
- Cadillac Gage Commando – (United States)

== Bibliography ==
- Beate Hamizrachi, The Emergence of South Lebanon Security Belt, Praeger Publishers Inc., New York 1984. ISBN 978-0-275-92854-4
- Charles Maisonneuve, AML Panhard – Des hommes, une histoire, Collection Vehicules Militaires, Histoire & Collections, Paris 2020. ISBN 9782352505143 (in French)
- David François, El Salvador – Volume 1: Crisis, Coup and Uprising 1970-1983, Latin America@War Volume 32, Helion & Company Limited, Warwick UK 2023. ISBN 978-1-804514-02-3
- David François, El Salvador – Volume 2: Conflagration 1984-1992, Latin America@War Volume 34, Helion & Company Limited, Warwick UK 2023. ISBN 978-1-804512-18-0
- Dunstan, Simon (2019). Panhard Armoured Car: 1961 Onwards (AML 60, AML 90, Eland), Enthusiasts' Manual. Somerset, UK: Haynes Publishing. ISBN 978-1-78521-194-2.
- Foss, Christopher F. (2002). Jane's Tank & Combat Vehicle recognition guide. London: HarperCollins. ISBN 0-00-712759-6.
- International Institute for Strategic Studies (February 2021). The Military Balance 2021. Vol. 121. Routledge. ISBN 978-1-032-01227-8.
- Éric Micheletti and Yves Debay, Liban – dix jours aux cœur des combats, RAIDS magazine n.º41, October 1989 issue. ISSN 0769-4814 (in French)
- Peter Gerard Locke & Peter David Farquharson Cooke, Fighting Vehicles and Weapons of Rhodesia 1965–80, P&P Publishing, Wellington 1995 ISBN 0-473-02413-6
- Paul Jureidini, R. D. McLaurin, and James Price, Military operations in selected Lebanese built-up areas, 1975-1978, Aberdeen, MD: U.S. Army Human Engineering Laboratory, Aberdeen Proving Ground, Technical Memorandum 11–79, June 1979.
- Kassis, Samer (2012). Véhicules Militaires au Liban 1975–1981 [Military Vehicles in Lebanon 1975-1981] (in French). Chyah: Trebia Publishing. ISBN 978-9953-0-2372-4.
- Sex, Zachary; Abi-Chahine, Bassel (2021). Modern Conflicts 2 – The Lebanese Civil War, From 1975 to 1991 and Beyond. Modern Conflicts Profile Guide. Vol. II. AK Interactive. EAN 8435568306073.
- Tony Badran (Barry Rubin ed.), Lebanon: Liberation, Conflict, and Crisis, Palgrave Macmillan, London 2010. ISBN 978-0-230-62306-4
- Zaloga, Steven J. (2003). Tank battles of the Mid-East Wars (2): The wars of 1973 to the present. Hong Kong: Concord Publications. ISBN 962-361-613-9.
