= Blackie the Pirate =

- Italian theatrical release poster by Renato Casaro
- Directed by: Enzo Gicca Palli
- Starring: Terence Hill; George Martin; Silvia Monti; Bud Spencer
- Edited by: Romeo Ciatti
- Music by: Gino Peguri
- Release date: 1971
- Running time: 99 minutes
- Country: Italy

Blackie the Pirate (Italian: Il corsaro nero) is a 1971 comedy film with Terence Hill and Bud Spencer, unusual in that the popular team has little screen time together.

== Story ==
In the late 17th century, Captain Blackie (Terence Hill) is a notorious pirate who learns about a shipment of Spanish gold when he encounters Don Pedro (George Martin). He devises a plan to find this ship and its gold. His rival is the Viceroy of the Spanish colony.

He goes to Tortuga (a pirate settlement), where Montbarc, DeLussac, and Skull (Bud Spencer), three other pirate captains, all have different versions of the events involving the gold; Montbarc sells two prisoners from his capture of a Spanish frigate. Don Pedro recognizes the wife of the Viceroy, and Blackie buys her. However, Skull also knows who she is, and tries to make a deal. Blackie refuses, and Skull makes a deal with the other two pirate captains to plot against Blackie. Blackie manages to elude and escape the other three and makes it to the San Luis, where he finds a secret about the gold. When he returns to his ship, it has been captured by the other three pirates where they plan to use it for their plan. Skull takes them as prisoners where he still demands to make a deal or torture them for information.

Blackie manages to free his crew, but loses his ship the "Fury". Skull is his prisoner, and he uses now Skull's ship the "Erebus" to get the gold.

== Cast ==
- Terence Hill as Blackie
- Silvia Monti as Isabel
- George Martin as Pedro
- Diana Lorys as Manuela
- Mónica Randall as Carmen
- Sal Borgese as Martin
- Pasquale Basile as Stiller
- Fernando Bilbao as Moko
- Bud Spencer as Skull
- Aldo Cecconi as Recruiter
- Paolo Magalotti as Alonso
- Gustavo Re as Noble
- Luciano Pigozzi as Montbarque
- Carlo Reali as DeLussac

== Production ==
Filming for this film took place shortly after the filming for They Call Me Trinity (1970) ended and before that movie was released and it became known how successful that movie, and its formula, would become. Shortly after filming for Blackie the Pirate (1971) was finished, the production for Trinity Is Still My Name (1971) started. The depiction of the sea battles was achieved by using stock footage.

== Biography ==
- Hughes, Howard (2011). Cinema Italiano - The Complete Guide From Classics To Cult. London - New York: I.B.Tauris. ISBN 978-1-84885-608-0.
