= Silvia Monti =

Italian actress (1946–2026)

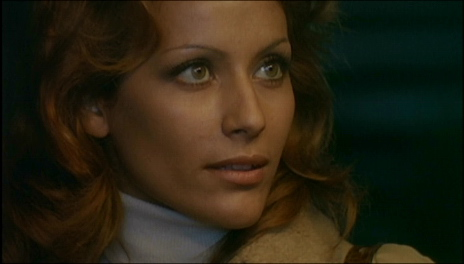
- Monti in the movie The Fifth Cord (1971)
- Born: Silvia Cornacchia; 23 January 1946; Bassano del Grappa, Italy
- Died: 11 August 2026 (aged 80); Lugano, Ticino, Switzerland
- Occupation: Actress
- Years active: 1969–1974

Silvia Monti (23 January 1946 – 11 August 2026) was an Italian actress.

Monti is mostly known for the female lead role as a mafioso's sister in the 1969 Gérard Oury caper film The Brain. In the movie, she has a scene where she gets down from a balcony using a rope while a song by Caterina Caselli plays in the background, Cento Giorni.

Monti retired from acting in 1974. She died in Lugano, Ticino, Switzerland on 11 August 2026, at the age of 80.

== Selected filmography ==
- Metti, una sera a cena (1969)
- Fräulein Doktor (1969)
- The Brain (1969)
- Queens of Evil (1970)
- A Lizard in a Woman's Skin (1971)
- Blackie the Pirate (1971)
- The Fifth Cord (1971)
- Lady Caroline Lamb (1972)
- The Sicilian Connection (1972)
- Master of Love (1972)
- It Was I (1973)
- The Bloody Hands of the Law (1973)
- The Last Desperate Hours (1974)
- While There's War There's Hope (1974)
- Il domestico (1974)
