= While There's War There's Hope =

- Directed by: Alberto Sordi
- Written by: Alberto Sordi; Leo Benvenuti; Piero De Bernardi
- Starring: Alberto Sordi; Silvia Monti
- Cinematography: Sergio D'Offizi
- Edited by: Ruggero Mastroianni
- Music by: Piero Piccioni
- Production company: Rizzoli Film
- Distributed by: Mundial Filmes (1975, Portugal); Iris (2016, Italy)
- Release date: 1974
- Country: Italy
- Language: Italian

While There's War There's Hope (Italian: Finché c'è guerra c'è speranza) is a 1974 satirical Commedia all'italiana film written, directed and starring Alberto Sordi. The film's success in Italy led to its title becoming a proverb.

== Plot ==
Pietro Chiocca is an Italian retailer, who sells hydraulic pumps. He realizes he will make money only if he starts selling weapons to poor Third World countries. The business is very successful although tiring and not exempt from risks. Pietro goes about it with dedication, enjoying the challenge of outsmarting his rivals and resorting to any tactics, no matter how immoral, to secure his dealings. This forces him to travel continuously, without playing much of a part to the life of his family. He loves them dearly and avoids sharing with them how their wealth is generated. On their side, they appear to take it for granted, always asking for more and squandering it in blissful ignorance.

During a business deal, Pietro is exposed more directly to the consequences of his weapons sales. A journalist also publishes a scoop which identifies him openly, and which raises public indignation among the general public. Pietro is shamed by his neighbors, his wife and children. However, when he explains them that he's ready to abandon the arms dealing business and go back to a less questionable but also less remunerative job, which will leave them poorer, none of them is willing to return to a more modest lifestyle. He is solicited instead to continue and to anticipate preparations for the next deal.

== Cast ==
- Alberto Sordi as Pietro Chiocca
- Silvia Monti as Silvia, Pietro's wife
- Alessandro Cutolo as Pietro's Uncle
- Matilde Costa Giuffrida as Pietro's Mother-in-law
- Edoardo Faieta as Gutierrez
- Mauro Firmani as Dicky
- Eliana De Santis as Giada
- Sergio Puppo as Balcazar
- Roy Bosier as Rabal
- Samuel Cummings as Himself
