= Pino Locchi =

Italian actor (1925–1994)

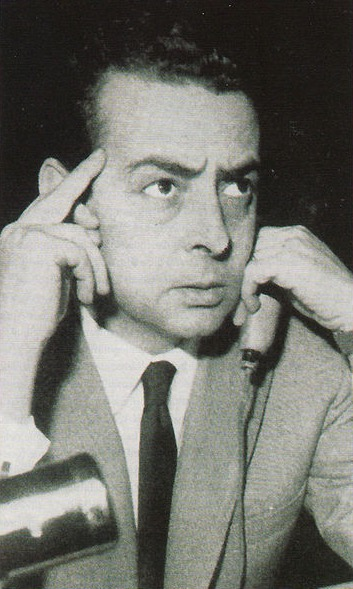
- Born: Giuseppe Locchi; 10 November 1925; Rome, Italy
- Died: 21 November 1994 (aged 69); Rome, Italy
- Occupations: Actor; voice actor; dubbing director
- Years active: 1932–1994
- Children: 2

Giuseppe "Pino" Locchi (10 November 1925 – 21 November 1994) was an Italian actor and voice actor.

== Biography ==
Locchi began his screen career as a child actor in 1932 starring in the film The Last Adventure and he continued his acting career as a child until 1942. Locchi later became a very prominent voice actor dubbing foreign films for release in the Italian market. In this profession, he dubbed the voices of many actors. He was the official Italian voice of Sean Connery until his death in 1994. Other actors he dubbed included Tony Curtis, Roger Moore, Charles Bronson, Terence Hill, Sidney Poitier, Jean-Paul Belmondo and many more.

Because Locchi was Sean Connery's official voice actor, he was the primary Italian voice of James Bond. Locchi continued to dub Bond while he was portrayed by George Lazenby and Roger Moore. In his animated film roles, he performed the Italian voices of characters in Disney animated feature films. He was the voice of Baloo the Bear in the 1967 film The Jungle Book and Little John in the 1973 film Robin Hood (Both characters were voiced by Phil Harris). He also voiced King Triton in the Italian dub of The Little Mermaid.

=== Personal life ===
Locchi has two children. His daughter, Marina works primarily as a theatre actress, while his son, Massimo is a dialogue adapter.

== Death ==
In the summer of 1994, Locchi suffered a heart attack followed by a stroke. He died on 21 November later that year, just eleven days after his 69th birthday.

After his death, Luciano De Ambrosis became the new Italian voice actor of Sean Connery.

== Filmography ==
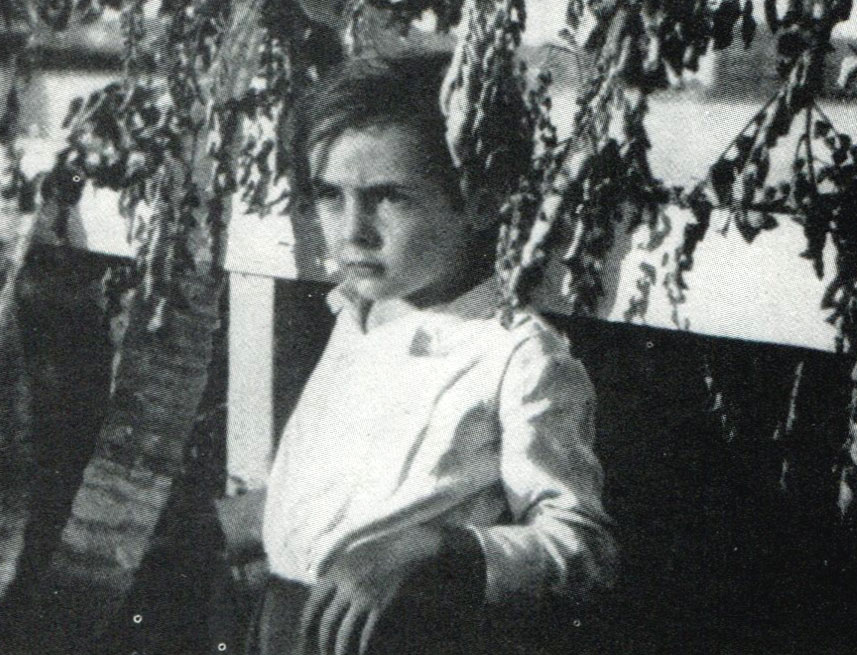
Locchi in The Canal of the Angels (1934)

=== Cinema ===
- The Last Adventure (1932)
- Zaganella and the Cavalier (1932)
- Sette giorni cento lire (1933)
- Black Shirt (1933)
- Mr. Desire (1934)
- The Canal of the Angels (1934)
- The Joker King (1935)
- 100 Days of Napoleon (1935)
- La luce del mondo (1935)
- God's Will Be Done (1936)
- Fireworks (1938)
- Who Are You? (1939)
- Gli ultimi della strada (1939)
- Disturbance (1942)
- The Affairs of Messalina (1951) - Uncredited
- La trappola di fuoco (1952)
- VIP my Brother Superman (1968) - Voice
- The Immortal Bachelor (1975)
- Stark System (1980)
- El Hombre de la multitud (1986)

== Dubbing roles ==
=== Animation ===
- Baloo in The Jungle Book
- Little John in Robin Hood
- King Triton in The Little Mermaid
- Wise Owl in So Dear to My Heart
- Sir Kay in The Sword in the Stone
- Toughy in Lady and the Tramp
- Gus in Cinderella (1967 redub)
- Bear in Bedknobs and Broomsticks
- Grifter Chizzling in Hey There, It's Yogi Bear!
- Ringo Starr in Yellow Submarine
- Narrator in Charlotte's Web

=== Live action ===
- James Bond in Dr. No, From Russia with Love, Goldfinger, Thunderball, Never Say Never Again, On Her Majesty's Secret Service, Diamonds Are Forever, You Only Live Twice, Octopussy, Moonraker, The Man with the Golden Gun, Live and Let Die, The Spy Who Loved Me, For Your Eyes Only, A View to a Kill
- Moses Zebulon 'Shalako' Carlin in Shalako
- Edward Pierce in The First Great Train Robbery
- Henry Jones, Sr. in Indiana Jones and the Last Crusade
- Joe Roberts in The Hill
- Marko Ramius in The Hunt for Red October
- Bartholomew "Barley" Scott Blair in The Russia House
- Colonel Arbuthnot in Murder on the Orient Express
- Johnson in The Offence
- Agamemnon / Fireman in Time Bandits
- Mark Rutland in Marnie
- Anthony Richmond in Woman of Straw
- Duke Anderson in The Anderson Tapes
- Paul Bradley in Meteor
- William T. O'Niel in Outland
- Robert Campbell in Medicine Man
- Roy Urquhart in A Bridge Too Far
- Juan Sánchez-Villalobos Ramírez in Highlander
- Juan Sánchez-Villalobos Ramírez in Highlander II: The Quickening
- William of Baskerville in The Name of the Rose
- Alan Caldwell in The Presidio
- Jessie McMullen in Family Business
- John Connor in Rising Sun
- Alex Murray in A Good Man in Africa
- Jimmy Malone in The Untouchables
- Antoninus in Spartacus
- Joe / "Josephine" / "Shell Oil Junior" in Some Like It Hot
- George Wellington Tracy in Goodbye Charlie
- Steve McCluskey in 40 Pounds of Trouble
- Danny Wilde in The Persuaders!
- Maurice/Philippe in Paris When It Sizzles
- Eric in The Vikings
- Albert DeSalvo in The Boston Strangler
- Terry Williams in Wild and Wonderful
- Johnny Dark in Johnny Dark
- Joe Maxwell in So This Is Paris
- Archie Porter in Tarzan in Manhattan
- Myles Falworth in The Black Shield of Falworth
- Andriy Bulba in Taras Bulba
- Bellboy in The Lady Gambles
- Jerry Florea in Six Bridges to Cross
- Pete Hammond Jr. in The Rat Race
- Sidney Falco in Sweet Smell of Success
- John "Joker" Jackson in The Defiant Ones
- Nick Holden in Operation Petticoat
- David Wilson in Who Was That Lady?
- Cory in Mister Cory
- Bernard Lawrence in Boeing Boeing
- Joe Martini in The Midnight Story
- Jackson Leibowitz in Captain Newman, M.D.
- Britt Harris in Kings Go Forth
- Ben Matthews in The Rawhide Years
- Leslie Gallant III in The Great Race
- Ferdinand Waldo Demara in The Great Impostor
- Paul Hodges in The Perfect Furlough
- Rene de Traviere / The Purple Mask in The Purple Mask
- Tino Orsini in Trapeze
- Martin N. Fenn in The Mirror Crack'd
- Captain Jones in Francis
- Trinity in They Call Me Trinity, Trinity Is Still My Name
- Plata in ... All the Way, Boys!
- Sir Thomas Fitzpatrick Phillip Moore in Man of the East
- Kid in Watch Out, We're Mad!
- Father J. in Two Missionaries
- Matt Kirby in Crime Busters
- Guido Falcone in Mr. Billion
- Johnny Firpo in Odds and Evens
- Slim in I'm for the Hippopotamus
- Dave Speed in Super Fuzz
- Alan Lloyd in Who Finds a Friend Finds a Treasure
- Rosco Frazer / Agent Steinberg in Go for It
- Marco Segrain in March or Die
- Joe Thanks in A Genius, Two Partners and a Dupe
- Nobody in My Name Is Nobody
- Jeff Heston in Violent City
- Arthur Bishop in The Mechanic
- Vince Majestyk in Mr. Majestyk
- Holland in The Evil That Men Do
- Joe Moran / Joe Martin in Cold Sweat
- Gifford Hoyt in Caboblanco
- Graham Dorsey in From Noon till Three
- The Stranger in Someone Behind the Door
- Garret Smith in Messenger of Death
- John Deakin in Breakheart Pass
- Mr. Roberts in The Indian Runner
- Reb Haislipp in Jubal
- Major Wolenski in Battle of the Bulge
- Scott Wardman in Lola
- Paul Lane in The Last Time I Saw Paris
- Jack in The King's Thief
- Simon Templar in The Saint and the Fiction Makers, Vendetta for the Saint
- Sir George Windsor in Fire, Ice and Dynamite
- Ferdinand Griffon in Pierrot le Fou
- Jean Letellier in Fear Over the City
- Michel Poiccard in Breathless
- Louis Dominique Bourguignon in Cartouche
- Michel Thibault in Banana Peel
- Adrien Dufourquet in That Man from Rio
- Arthur Lempereur in Up to His Ears
- Louis Mahé in Mississippi Mermaid
- François Capella in Borsalino
- Roberto La Rocca in Bad Luck
- Paul Simay in Dr. Popaul
- Azad in The Burglars
- François Leclercq in Body of My Enemy
- Roger Pilard in The Hunter Will Get You
- Victor Vauthier in Incorrigible
- Alexandre Stavisky in Stavisky
- François Merlin / Bob Saint-Clar in The Magnificent
- Josselin Beaumont in The Professional
- Yvon "Pierrelot" Morandat in Is Paris Burning?
- Barthelemy Cordell in The Inheritor
- Antoine Maréchal in Tender Scoundrel
- Julien Maillat in Weekend at Dunkirk
- François Holin in Ho!
- Yancy Hawks in The Wild and the Innocent
- Clay in Hell Bent for Leather
- Joe Maybe in Ride a Crooked Trail
- Jim Harvey in Tumbleweed
- Ring Hassard in Sierra
- John Clum in Walk the Proud Land
- The Utica Kid in Night Passage
- Audie Murphy in To Hell and Back
- Clay O'Mara in Ride Clear of Diablo
- Matt Brown in Cast a Long Shadow
- Luke Cromwell in The Duel at Silver Creek
- Reb Kittridge in Gunsmoke
- Thomas in Beyond Glory
- Billy the Kid in The Kid from Texas
- John Gant in No Name on the Bullet
- John Woodley in Joe Butterfly
- Rau-Ru Ponce de Leon in Band of Angels
- Homer Smith in Lilies of the Field
- Ben Munceford in The Bedford Incident
- John Prentice in Guess Who's Coming to Dinner
- Virgil Tibbs in In the Heat of the Night
- Virgil Tibbs in They Call Me Mister Tibbs!, The Organization
- Roy Parmenter in Little Nikita
- Donald Crease in Sneakers
- Samuel Trautman in First Blood, Rambo: First Blood Part II
- Richard Aldrich in Star!
- Oliver Hardy in Laurel and Hardy (1955-1958 redubs)
- Vince Everett in Jailhouse Rock
- Danny Fisher in King Creole
- Chad Gates in Blue Hawaii
- Pacer Burton in Flaming Star
- Ross Carpenter in Girls! Girls! Girls!
- Mike Windgren in Fun in Acapulco
- Rick Richards in Paradise, Hawaiian Style
- Ted Jackson in Easy Come, Easy Go
- Steve Grayson in Speedway
- Charlie Rogers in Roustabout
- Mike Edwards in It Happened at the World's Fair
- Husband E. Kimmel in Tora! Tora! Tora!
- Mr. Beamish in St. Elmo's Fire
- Juror #1 in 12 Angry Men
- Jack in Middle of the Night
- Mr. Pym in Two Evil Eyes
- Sherif Ali in Lawrence of Arabia
- Francisco in Behold a Pale Horse
- Major Grau in The Night of the Generals
- Feodor Sverdlov in The Tamarind Seed
- Nicky Arnstein in Funny Lady
- Deacon in The Baltimore Bullet
- Lou Caruthers in Back to the Future
- Tom Robinson in To Kill a Mockingbird
- Narrator in Far and Away
- Gordon Grant in A Kiss Before Dying
- Child Catcher in Chitty Chitty Bang Bang
- Charlie Foster in A Breath of Scandal
- John McBurney in The Beguiled
- Burt Hanson in Autumn Leaves
- Vin Tanner in The Magnificent Seven

== Bibliography ==
- Roberto Curti. Italian Crime Filmography, 1968–1980. McFarland, 2013.
