= Bud Spencer & Terence Hill: Slaps and Beans =

2018 cooperative video game

- Developer: Trinity Team srls
- Publisher: Buddy Productions GmbH
- Engine: Unity Engine
- Platforms: Windows; Linux; macOS; PlayStation 4; Xbox One; Nintendo Switch; Android; iOS; SteamOS
- Release: WW: December 15, 2017; List of re-releases; PlayStation 4, Xbox One, Nintendo Switch: NA: October 18, 2018; EU: October 18, 2018
- Genre: Beat 'em up
- Modes: Single-player, multiplayer

Bud Spencer & Terence Hill: Slaps and Beans is a side-scrolling beat 'em up game, with some elements of platform and minigames, developed by Trinity Team srls, it is the first official videogame inspired by the Italian duo of actors Bud Spencer and Terence Hill, and released first in 2017 for PC and then ported in 2018 also for PlayStation 4, Xbox One and Nintendo Switch. A sequel, ''Slaps and Beans 2'', was released in 2023.

== Plot ==
The game is a tribute to the films made in the 1970s and 1980s with the duo of actors, in which Bud Spencer and Terence Hill must thwart the diabolical plans of a group led by the evil "Capo". The settings of the game are taken from the filmography of the duo and range from the Wild West, to Miami, to the tropical island on which the movie Who Finds a Friend Finds a Treasure is set.

== Gameplay ==
Bud Spencer & Terence Hill: Slaps and Beans is a side-scrolling beat 'em up game that takes its cue from classics of the genre, such as Double Dragon or Golden Axe, but with advanced combat mechanics aimed at buying combat choreography as much as possible faithful to the fist fights of Bud and Terence. In some moments it will be necessary to use the specific skills of the protagonists (such as Terence's agility and Bud's strength) to overcome obstacles and proceed in the story. The fundamental ingredients of the game are obviously the classic fights of Bud and Terence, but it is enriched by the presence of several mini-games, such as dune buggy races, the car of Watch Out, We're Mad!.

The graphics are in the style of 90s pixel art. The soundtrack is made up of a samples of effects and many pieces by Oliver Onions, the musical duo composed of the brothers Guido and Maurizio De Angelis, who made the soundtracks of most of the films that inspired the game.

== Development ==
Bud Spencer & Terence Hill: Slaps and Beans is the evolution of Schiaffi&Fagioli, an unofficial playable demo for Windows and macOS published in October 2015, created as part of a game jam between independent Italian programmers dedicated to spaghetti westerns. Bud Spencer & Terence Hill: Slaps and Beans was then made, with the necessary official licenses, thanks to a Kickstarter fundraising campaign conducted between October and December, 2016.

== Soundtrack ==
Dune Buggy – Oliver Onions (from Watch Out, We're Mad!); Bulldozer – Oliver Onions (from They Called Him Bulldozer); Il coro dei Pompieri – Oliver Onions (from Watch Out, We're Mad!); Due superpiedi quasi piatti – Oliver Onions (from Crime Busters); Flying Through the Air – Oliver Onions (from ... All the Way, Boys!); Miami Supercops – The Fantastic Oceans (from Miami Supercops); Movin’ Cruisin – The Fantastic Oceans (from Who Finds a Friend Finds a Treasure); Mr. Nothingoesright – Oliver Onions (from Everything Happens to Me)	Trinity – Franco Micalizzi (from They Call Me Trinity); L'ultimo Valzer – Oliver Onions (from The Sheriff and the Satellite Kid); Whistle & Bells – Oliver Onions (from The Sheriff and the Satellite Kid); Boss Rock – MushroomSound; Run to the Duel – MushroomSound; The Beans Wall – MushroomSound; Western Desert – MushroomSound; Western Duel – MushroomSound

== Reception ==
The aggregated reviews of Bud Spencer & Terence Hill: Slaps and Beans on the Metacritic website give the game an average score of 63% (based on 10 reviews).

The Italian online newspaper Multiplayer praised the pixel art graphics, the soundtrack and the variety of the minigames. It noted, however, some flaws and the excessive ease of defeating the bosses.

The Everyeye website, noted how difficult it is to approach the video game in an impartial way because "the title of Trinity Team has a beating heart made of nostalgia and precious memories, those recalled by a duo who, straddling Generation X and that of the Millennials, assumed the same popular-cultural importance of the episodes of Kenshiro on Junior TV." However, they praised the art production, thanks to the merits of the pixel art and the sound accompaniment composed of some of the most famous music from Oliver Onions. They complained about the absence of online co-op and some of the minigames having an inconsistent level of challenge.
