= Terence Hill and Bud Spencer =

Film duo

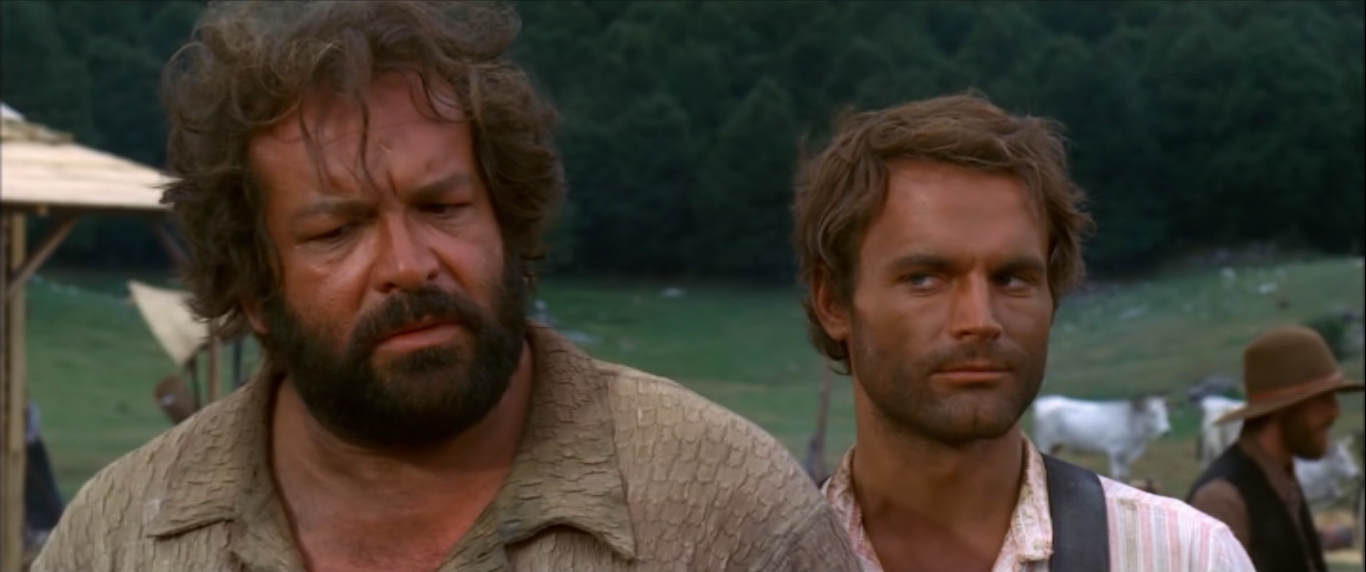
Spencer (left) and Hill in They Call Me Trinity by Enzo Barboni (1970)

Terence Hill (born Mario Girotti in 1939) and Bud Spencer (born Carlo Pedersoli, 1929–2016) are Italian actors who made numerous action-comedy and spaghetti Western films together. They "garnered world acclaim and attracted millions to theater seats". While Hill's characters were agile and youthful, Spencer always played the "phlegmatic, grumpy strong-arm man with a blessed, naive child's laughter and a golden heart".

== History ==
They first appeared in the same movie under their real names in Hannibal (1959), but not as a duo: they only appeared in supporting roles, had no scenes in common, and did not meet during filming. Their first movie as a duo was God Forgives... I Don't! (1967). Originally Peter Martell was chosen as the leading actor next to Spencer, but the day before the first shoot, Martell broke his foot and was replaced by Hill, which launched their partnership. The film director asked the two actors to change their names, deeming them to be too Italian-sounding for a Western movie. At the time, the cast and crew of Italian Westerns frequently adopted American names to give their film a better chance of selling in non-Italian speaking countries; Girotti changed his name to "Terence Hill" and Pedersoli chose "Bud Spencer", with Bud inspired by Budweiser beer and Spencer by the actor Spencer Tracy.

Most of their early films were spaghetti Westerns, beginning with God Forgives... I Don't! (1967), the first part of a trilogy, followed by Ace High (1968) and Boot Hill (1969). They had a huge hit with the comedy Western They Call Me Trinity (1970). When the film was first announced, Peter Martell was set to play Trinity and George Eastman Bambino. The two characters were later portrayed by Hill and Spencer, who became a popular comic duo following the release of God Forgives... I Don't! . The sequel of They Call Me Trinity (1970), Trinity Is Still My Name (1971), was even more popular than the original. The film was a huge financial success, becoming the top-grossing Italian film up to then, with 14,554,172 admissions in Italy - a distinction previously held by its predecessor, They Call Me Trinity. With 12,267,000 viewers, this movie is the seventh most successful film in Germany to date. The film also had a successful release in the United States. Troublemakers (1994), their last screen pairing, was in the same genre.

Hill played the title swashbuckler in Blackie the Pirate (1971), in which Spencer had a small role. Filming for this film took place shortly after the filming for They Call Me Trinity (1970) ended and before that movie was released and it became known how successful that movie, and its formula, would become. Shortly after filming for Blackie the Pirate (1971) was finished, the production for Trinity Is Still My Name (1971) started.

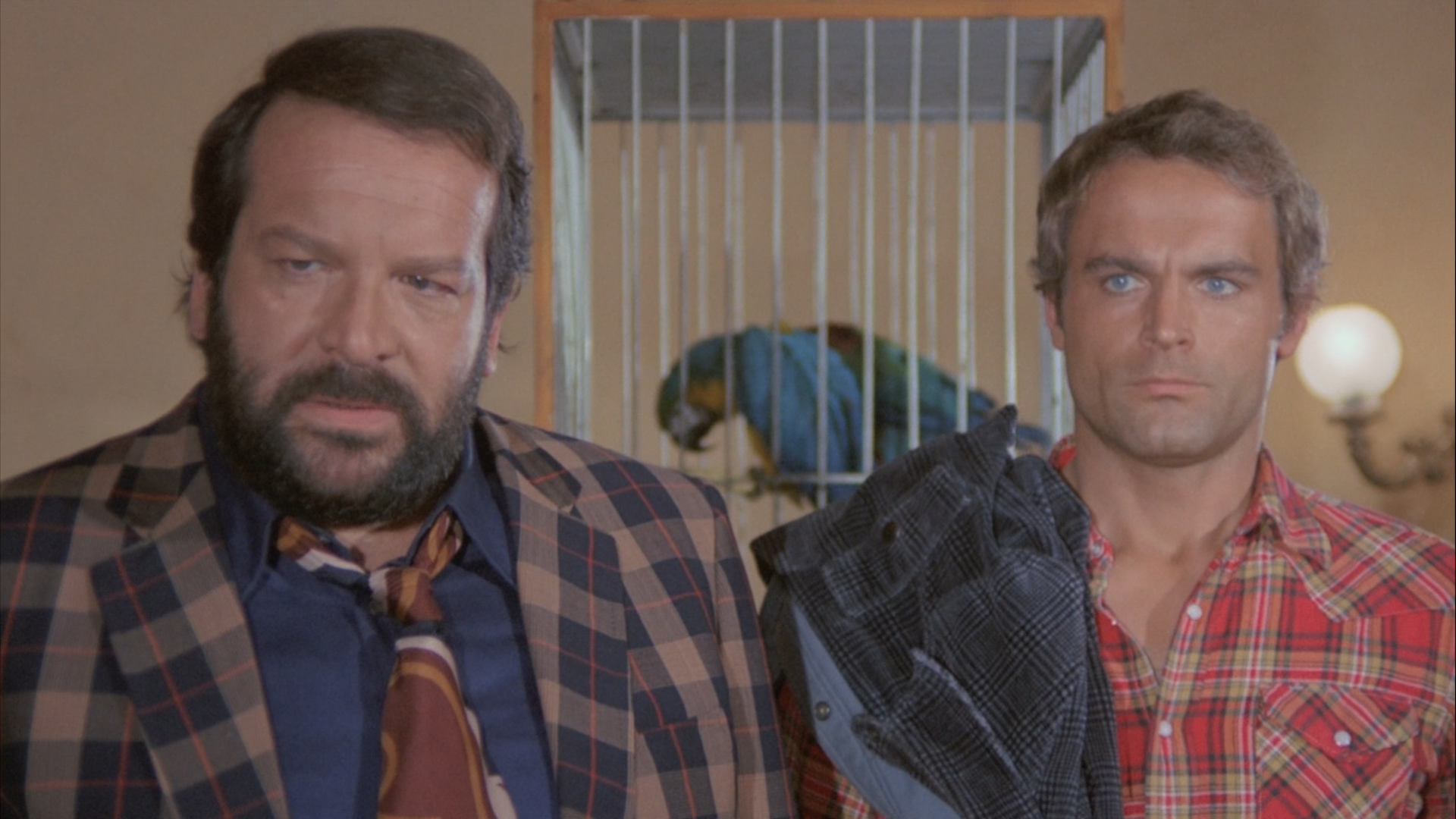
Terence Hill and Bud Spencer in Watch Out, We're Mad! (1974) by Marcello Fondato

... All the Way, Boys! (1972) was the first film set in a modern context, although many other slapstick elements of the earlier films were carried over. (Note: Blackie the Pirate (Italian: Il corsaro nero) (1971) was the first film that the comedy team made that departed from the western formula.) They starred in more non-Westerns, e.g. Watch Out, We're Mad! (1974) and Two Missionaries (1974). By 1975, their films had grossed over $50 million (30 billion lire) in Italy. After a three-year break, they reunited in Crime Busters (1977), which was their first movie filmed in Miami. Most of the movies that followed were filmed in Miami. They starred in Odds and Evens (1978), I'm for the Hippopotamus (1979), Who Finds a Friend Finds a Treasure (1981), Go for It (1983) and Double Trouble (1984). Miami Supercops (1985) was their final non-Western film together and their last movie before they reunited nine years later for their final pairing in Troublemakers (1994).

Many of their movies have alternative titles, depending upon the country and distributor. Some have longer Italian versions that were edited for release abroad. These films gathered popularity for both actors, especially throughout much of Europe and parts of Asia and South America.

Despite Hill's fluency in Italian and English, he was usually dubbed by other actors in both languages. In the Italian versions of his films, various actors provided his voice until the late 1960s, where he was primarily dubbed by Sergio Graziani; he was voiced by Pino Locchi from 1970 to 1983, and by Michele Gammino from 1983 to 1996. For English dubs, Lloyd Battista dubbed him in six films, while Roger Browne dubbed him in most of his early 1970s films (They Call Me Trinity to A Genius, Two Partners and a Dupe); from Mr. Billion onward, Hill dubbed his own English voice.

Spencer was generally dubbed by actor Glauco Onorato in the Italian versions of his films due to his thick Naples accent, although he was voiced by Sergio Fiorentini in Troublemakers. For English dubs, Spencer was usually voiced by Robert Sommer, Edward Mannix or Richard McNamara, although he occasionally provided his own voice.

Even Angels Eat Beans (1973) was originally intended to star Spencer and Hill, but Hill dropped out and was replaced by Giuliano Gemma. The film produced a sequel in 1974, Charleston. Spencer refused to reprise his role, and was replaced with Ricky Bruch. Speaking of the Devil (1991) was originally intended to star Hill alongside Spencer, but Hill had to turn it down, as he was still engaged in the Lucky Luke TV series.

Because of the duo's huge popularity, many producers wanted to exploit this with visually similar duos. Most notable were Paul L. Smith (adopted name Adam Eden in later years, sometimes credited Anam Eden) and Michael Coby (real name Antonio Cantafora) with a series of movies in Bud & Terence-fashion from 1973 to 1977: Carambola! (1974), Carambola's Philosophy: In the Right Pocket (1975), Convoy Buddies (1975), We Are No Angels (1975) and The Diamond Peddlers (1976). One of these films, Convoy Buddies, was selected for American release by Film Ventures International, and producer Edward L. Montoro changed Smith's name to "Bob Spencer" and Cantafora's name to "Terrence Hall". Smith sued, successfully arguing that an actor's name recognition is vital to his career. The judicial system agreed and ruled against FVI, which paid Smith damages and court costs.

In the 1980s and early 1990s, István Bujtor, the most frequent Hungarian dubbing voice of Bud Spencer starred in (and occasionally also directed) a number of Hungarian action comedies in the Bud Spencer-Terence Hill genre. Based on his physical resemblance to Spencer, Bujtor played hard-hitting detective Csöpi Ötvös, partnered with fellow Hungarian actor András Kern.

In 2017, a video game inspired by their films, Bud Spencer & Terence Hill: Slaps and Beans, was released. A sequel was released in 2023.

== Filmography ==
- Hannibal (1959) (not as a duo and credited under their real names)
- God Forgives... I Don't! (1967)
- Ace High (1968)
- Boot Hill (1969)
- They Call Me Trinity (1970)
- Blackie the Pirate (1971)
- Trinity Is Still My Name (1971)
- ... All the Way, Boys! (1972)
- Watch Out, We're Mad! (1974)
- Two Missionaries (1974)
- Crime Busters (1977)
- Odds and Evens (1978)
- I'm for the Hippopotamus (1979)
- Who Finds a Friend Finds a Treasure (1981)
- Go for It (1983)
- Double Trouble (1984)
- Miami Supercops (1985)
- Troublemakers (1994)

== See also ==
- Cinema of Italy
- Spaghetti Western

== Bibliography ==
- Raimondi, Antonio; Raimondi, Rocco (2021). Bud Spencer e Terence Hill. Un compendio apologetico [Bud Spencer and Terence Hill. An apologetic compendium] (in Italian). Amazon Digital Services LLC - KDP Print US. ISBN 979-8776576447.
