= Sons of Trinity =

1995 film

Trinità & Bambino ... e adesso tocca a noi! (Sons of Trinity)
- Directed by: Enzo Barboni (E.B. Clucher)
- Written by: Enzo Barboni, Marco Tullio Barboni
- Produced by: Italo Zingarelli
- Starring: Heath Kizzier; Keith Neubert
- Cinematography: Juan Amorós
- Edited by: Antonio Siciliano
- Music by: Stefano Mainetti
- Distributed by: Trainidad Film
- Release date: 29 June 1995
- Running time: 103 min
- Country: Italy
- Languages: Italian; English

Sons of Trinity (Italian: Trinità & Bambino... e adesso tocca a noi, also known as Trinity & Babyface and Trinity & Bambino: The Legend Lives On) is a 1995 Italian, Spanish and German international co-production spaghetti Western comedy film. It is a continuation of the Trinity series starring Terence Hill and Bud Spencer, and it was directed and produced by the creators of the original films; Italo Zingarelli and Enzo Barboni. It was the last film directed by Enzo Barboni.

Sons of Trinity was cast by casting director, Louis Digiaimo.

== Plot ==
The children of Trinity and Bambino bear the same names of their fathers and, like them, they get a job in a dusty town in the West. Trinity Junior is a bounty hunter prankster and womanizer, while Bambino, more gruff, is also the sheriff and the jailer. The quiet peace of the two, who plan to marry two beautiful girls, is interrupted by the arrival of two gangs, one Anglo, one Mexican, of horse stealing criminals in a small Mexican town.

== Cast ==
- Heath Kizzier: Trinity
- Keith Neubert: Bambino
- Yvonne de Bark: Bonita
- Fanny Cadeo: Scintilla
- Renato Scarpa: Pablo
- Ronald Nitschke: Sheriff
- Siegfried Rauch: Parker
- Renato D'Amore: Ramirez Primero
- Riccardo Pizzuti: Gunslinger
- Jack Taylor: Theopolis
