= Picked off =

Picked off could refer to:

- Picked Off, an American television series on History
- Pickoff, a baseball play to tag out a baserunner
- A pass thrown for an interception in American and Canadian football
