= They Call Me Renegade =

- Main promotional art by Renato Casaro
- Directed by: E.B. Clucher
- Written by: Marco Barboni
- Story by: Marco Barboni; Terence Hill; Sergio Donati; Steven Siebert
- Produced by: Lucio Bompani
- Starring: Terence Hill; Robert Vaughn; Norman Bowler; Ross Hill
- Cinematography: Alfio Contini
- Edited by: Eugenio Alabiso
- Release date: 1987
- Running time: 92 minutes
- Country: Italy
- Language: English

They Call Me Renegade is a 1987 road movie directed by E.B. Clucher and starring Terence Hill and his son Ross Hill.

== Plot summary ==
"Renegade" Luke (Hill), a drifter and petty con artist, lives a free and easy life with no responsibility travelling around the Southwestern United States in his Jeep CJ-5 Renegade with a chestnut colt named Joe Brown. The events take a sudden twist when his friend Moose (Norman Bowler), who has won a ranch in Arizona during a poker game, asks Luke to become the legal guardian of Moose's son Matt (Ross Hill) and to keep an eye on him and the property until either his son comes of age at 18, while he is serving time in jail for a crime he claims he didn't commit. Both Luke and Matt are less than enthusiastic about the idea but eventually they reluctantly make their way to Arizona together. As they progress on their trip they experience an abnormal series of accidents, including crazy truckers in an articulated semi trying to drive them off the road, a biker-gang trying to hassle them on their way.

On entering the area where the property is situated, and asking for directions, he comes afoul of the local sheriff and his deputy, warning him to stay out of trouble which when Luke gets directions, calls someone called 'Mr Lawson'. They find the property soon after, a run-down house-on-the-lake, and meet the local Amish people who seem to be happy to welcome them to the neighborhood. Soon after a group of people come to visit trying to get him to sell the properly to a firm called Lawson Enterprises. Once Luke basically refuses, a comedy of the people then try to force the issue, until they leave after Matt messes around with their helicopter.

Some time after this, after coming back from town and the Amish homestead, as they near their home, Luke's horse, Joe Brown, refuses to get up which makes Luke very suspicious and as he nears, it dramatically explodes into a million pieces shocking Luke and Matt. Luke is now annoyed and goes to confront this 'Lawson' person at Lawson Enterprises.

It turns out that Mr. Henry Lawson (Robert Vaughn), who framed Moose, and had him put in prison due to the property he won, is stopping him buying out an area of land and developing it. Also Moose could recognize him as Capt. Lenny Covacks, the Captain of his and Luke's platoon, and prevent them from revealing who he was and what he did in which he killed some of his platoon so he could abscond with 500 phials of morphine, and which he set himself up as a respectable Lawyer. Luke, after recognizing Lawson as his dead platoon captain (which isn't revealed yet) and crashes out the 2nd story window as 2 sets of two goons appear behind and to the side. A car chase ensues with Luke managing to stay ahead of Lawson and his goons. Also during this chase he manages getting Matt off to safety as Lawson's goons chase him in three cars with Lawson himself in a small helicopter. Eventually Lawson catches up and shoots Luke's tires out at one of Lawson's constructions sites effectively boxing him in. Here Lawson reveals the hows and whys of Moose and the property. With the help of Matt and the gang of bikers, that Luke had a run-in before getting to the property, they manage to force the defeat Lawson and become good friends and which it ends with them heading to the state prison to get Matt's father Moose as hes now been exonerated of the crime(s) Lawson framed him for with a last run-in with the truckers that Luke and Matt had run into a few times getting some nasty payback which nearly blew back into Luke's face as he was actually out of fuel.

== Production ==
They Call Me Renegade was filmed in English on location in Phoenix, Glendale, Sedona and Flagstaff in Arizona. Cast and production crew were primarily American and Italian and include local notables such as Phoenix sculpture artist and custom trike builder Al Banks, then head of Arizona ABATE motorcycle activist group.

== Soundtrack ==
"Simple Man" and "Call Me The Breeze" by Lynyrd Skynyrd where chosen as main theme. Mauro Paoluzzi wrote and produced the original soundtrack, whilst Nicolette Larson also appeared on the release with the song "Let Me Be the One" from her 1988 album Shadows of Love.
