= Double Trouble (1984 film) =

- Italian theatrical release poster by Renato Casaro
- Directed by: E.B. Clucher
- Written by: Marcotullio Barboni
- Produced by: Vittorio Galiano
- Starring: Terence Hill; Bud Spencer
- Cinematography: Silvano Ippoliti; Hélio Silva
- Edited by: Philip Edwards
- Music by: Franco Micalizzi
- Production company: Trans-Cinema TV
- Distributed by: CEIAD
- Release date: 1984
- Running time: 99 min
- Country: Italy
- Language: English

Double Trouble (Italian: Non c'è due senza quattro, lit. 'Never Two Without Four') is a 1984 Italian action comedy film directed by Enzo Barboni (as E.B. Clucher) and starring the film duo of Terence Hill and Bud Spencer.

In the film, two billionaire cousins have survived several assassination attempts. Out of concern for their own safety, they hire two look-alikes as political decoys. The two replacements decide to investigate who masterminds the assassination attempts.

== Plot ==
Mild-mannered Portuguese Brazilian billionaire cousins Bastiano and Antonio Coimbra de la Coronilla y Azevedo are in fear for their lives after several assassination attempts. Therefore, they have an agency find two look-alikes, stuntman Elliot Vance and the saxophone-playing small-time criminal Greg Wonder, to temporarily take their place and find out who is behind the assassination attempts.

Elliot and Greg, both very tough and battle-ready as compared to the violence-averse Coimbra cousins, use their flamboyance and fighting skills to manage their way through all kinds of situations without too much trouble while getting closer to the mastermind behind it all. Additionally they quickly come to like the jet-set life. The resulting damage to their reputation provokes the Coimbras to return to Rio ahead of time. This puts them right into the sights of their enemies, alongside the cousins' look-alikes.

After a long battle with mercenaries hired by the mastermind to take the cousins alive at a farm, the mastermind is finally unmasked as Bastiano Coimbra's lover, Donna Olympia Chavez who reveals that she actually holds no personal grudge on him unlike his cousin, Antonio for allegedly ruining and destroying her father and forcing him to run away 2 years ago.

After Donna faints at the sight of seeing doubles while cursing and berating Greg as Antonio for his supposed misdeeds, the real Antonio reveals that her father was actually the real criminal when he stole from the former 2 years ago and ran off with a dancer to Paris living in high-style during a financial operation with other partners while having also convinced his own daughter that the whole thing was entirely Antonio's fault in the first place, which resulted in a meaningless murder attempt on the Coimbras' lives out of personal revenge for nothing ever since.

After Elliot suggests that Bastiano simply explains the entire matter to Donna when she wakes up later on in order to clear up the whole misunderstanding, both Elliot and Greg demand the money promised to them by the Coimbras in exchange for their services, as per agreed. Once paid in checks, they happily drive off in the cousins' car to the airport and ask the chauffeurs to return to the farm and "pick them up again" afterwards.

== Cast ==
- Terence Hill as Elliot Vance / Bastiano Joao Coimbra de la Coronilla y Azevedo
- Bud Spencer as Greg Wonder / Antonio Coimbra de la Coronilla y Azevedo
- April Clough as Donna Olympia Chavez
- Nello Pazzafini as Tango
- Harold Bergman
- C.V. Wood Jr.
- Dary Reiz
- Franco Sattamini as Tango's Thug
