= Miami Supercops =

1985 Italian comedy film

- Theatrical release poster by Renato Casaro
- Directed by: Bruno Corbucci
- Written by: Bruno Corbucci; Luciano Vincenzoni
- Produced by: Josi W. Konski; Max Wolkoff
- Starring: Terence Hill; Bud Spencer; Ken Ceresne; Richard Liberty; Rhonda Lundstedt; Buffy Dee; Michael Warren; Luke Halpin; Jackie Castellano
- Cinematography: Silvano Ippoliti
- Edited by: Daniele Alabiso
- Music by: Carmelo La Bionda; Michelangelo La Bionda
- Distributed by: Columbia Pictures Italia
- Release date: 11 December 1985 (Milan)
- Running time: 96 minutes
- Country: Italy
- Language: Italian

Miami Supercops (Italian: Miami Supercops (I poliziotti dell'8ª strada)) is a 1985 Italian action comedy film starring the comedy team of Terence Hill and Bud Spencer. It was their final non-Western film together.

The film opens with a bank robbery in Detroit. Only one of the robbers was caught and imprisoned. Following his release, the man was found dead in Miami. Two FBI agents start working undercover as Miami police officers, in hope of locating the last surviving robber and his loot.

== Synopsis ==
In 1978, $20 million was stolen from a Detroit bank. One of the robbers was caught, one was found dead, and the third disappeared. The money was never found. In 1985, the captured robber was released from jail. He immediately went to Miami, only to be found dead the next day.

Now FBI agents Doug Bennet (a cop in New York) and Steve Forest (who has opened a school for helicopter pilots in Tampa) have been called in to investigate the case while posing as Miami police officers. Somewhere in Miami, the third robber is hiding with his $20 million, and he has a seven-year head start on the authorities.
