= Un militare e mezzo =

- Directed by: Steno
- Written by: Mario Amendola; Aldo Fabrizi; Roberto Gianviti; Ruggero Maccari; Vittorio Metz; Steno
- Produced by: Silvio Clementelli
- Starring: Aldo Fabrizi; Renato Rascel; Virna Lisi; Terence Hill
- Cinematography: Tino Santoni
- Music by: Armando Trovajoli
- Distributed by: Lux Film (Italy)
- Release date: 1960
- Running time: 114 minutes
- Country: Italy
- Language: Italian

Un militare e mezzo (literally One soldier and a half) is a 1960 Italian comedy film directed by Steno.

== Plot ==
Carletti, a 50-year-old man who has returned from the United States with his family, is forced into the military because he had evaded his draft. In the barracks he finds a marshal who forces him to follow the law and to observe the rigorous military discipline. Carletti makes every effort in order to get out of this condition and to return to his pharmaceutical affairs which, according to him, would bring him fortune.
