= Io non protesto, io amo =

- Directed by: Ferdinando Baldi
- Written by: Ferdinando Baldi; Franco Rossetti
- Starring: Caterina Caselli
- Cinematography: Enzo Barboni
- Music by: Franco Monaldi
- Distributed by: Euro International Film
- Release date: 1967
- Country: Italy
- Language: Italian

Io non protesto, io amo (Italian for I don't protest, I love) is a 1967 Italian "musicarello" film written and directed by Ferdinando Baldi and starring Caterina Caselli and Terence Hill (here credited as Mario Girotti).

== Cast ==
- Caterina Caselli as Caterina
- Mario Girotti as Gabriele
- Bruno Scipioni as Friar Collisio
- Pinuccio Ardia as Giuseppe
- Giancarlo Cobelli as Filippo
- Riccardo Del Turco as himself
- Mario De Simone as The Major
- Luisa De Santis as Dorothy
- Livio Lorenzon as Baron Francesco Maria Calò
- Mario Frera as Beniamino
- Nina Larker as Barbara
- Enzo Maggio as Felice
- Enrico Montesano as Domenico
- Tiberio Murgia as Salvatore
- Antonella Murgia as Evelina
- Rosita Pisano as Anna Maria
