= John Fujioka =

American actor

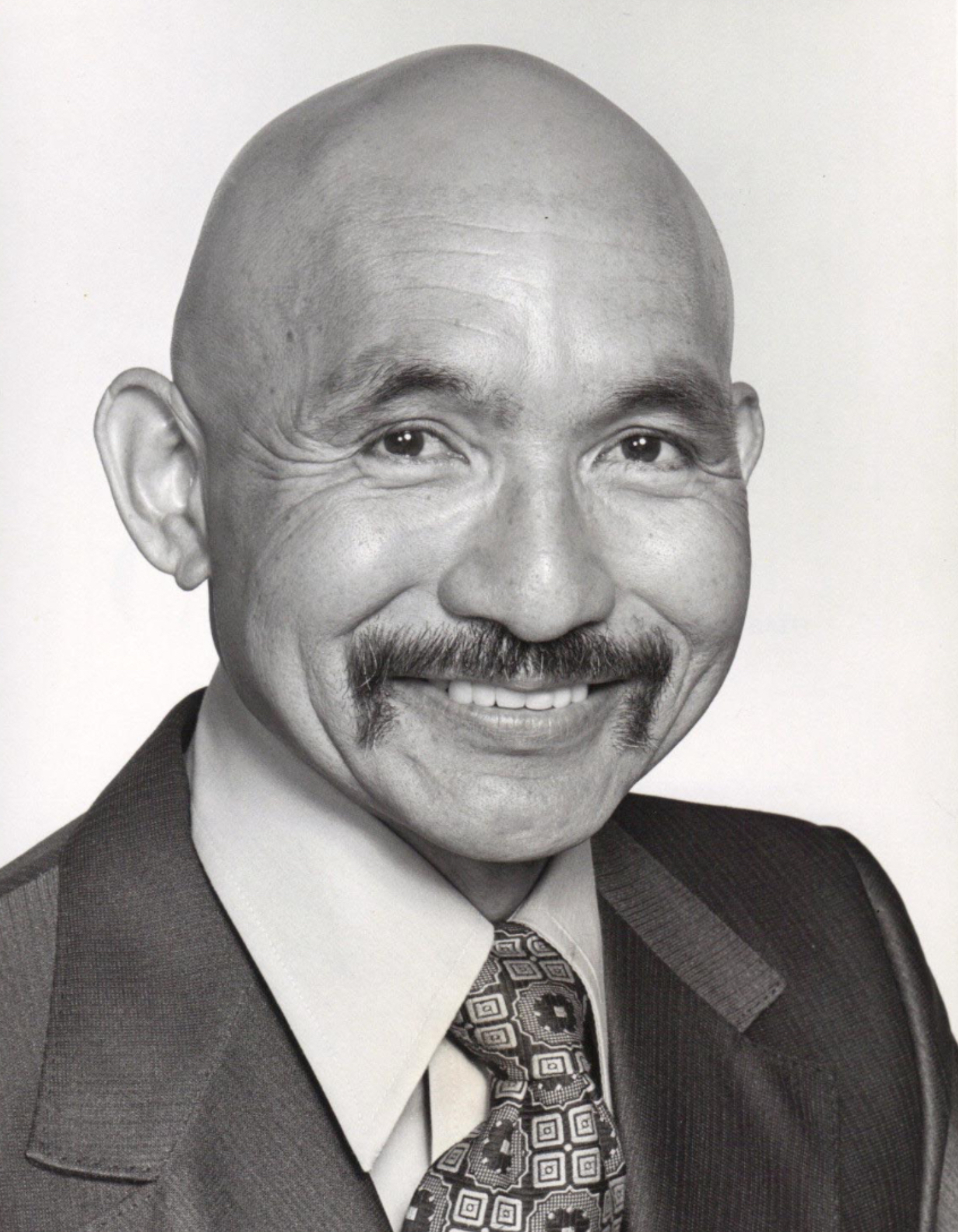
- Fujioka in The Last Resort, 1979
- Born: John Mamoru Fujioka; June 29, 1925; Ola'a, Hawaii, U.S.
- Died: December 13, 2018 (aged 93); Los Angeles, California, U.S.
- Occupation: Actor
- Years active: 1962–2004

John Mamoru Fujioka (June 29, 1925 – December 13, 2018) was an American actor of Japanese descent. He was particularly known for performing the role of a Japanese holdout soldier in The Last Flight of Noah's Ark, Who Finds a Friend Finds a Treasure, and American Ninja. He died on December 13, 2018 at the age of 93.

== Early life and career ==
Born in Ola'a, Hawaii, Fujioka was the third of six children in a family that had immigrated from Japan after World War I. He attended Hilo High School, University of Hawaii, and Elmhurst College, graduating with a degree in Sociology. Fujika later enlisted in the U.S. Army in 1944. During his service, Fujioka worked in Washington, D.C., interpreting Japanese documents and later joined the U.S. occupation forces in Japan at the end of the war.

After his discharge in 1947, he attended Elmhurst College in Illinois, where he studied sociology and worked part-time as a Polynesian dancer in Honolulu Harry’s Club Waikiki. Following his graduation in 1951, Fujioka was employed as a social worker for Cook County, Chicago.

Fujioka began his acting career in 1958 after being approached by a theatrical agent at a social event in New York City. His first role was as an understudy in The World of Suzie Wong, which he later performed on Broadway and in the national touring company.

His breakthrough came in 1974 when he portrayed General Tomoyuki Yamashita in Stanley Kramer's The Court Martial of the Tiger of Malaya. In 1982, Fujioka portrayed the Samurai warrior Todo in the ABC adventure series Tales of the Gold Monkey, in which his character commanded a private army protecting the trading ships of Princess Kogi in the South Seas. To prepare for the role, Fujioka trained in Japanese swordsmanship under Master Tak Kubota, a karate master and veteran of many motion pictures.

== Personal life ==
Fujioka, who was openly gay, was survived by his life partner, Gerald Lentes.

== Partial filmography ==
- 1962 Confessions of an Opium Eater as Auctioneer
- 1962 A Girl Named Tamiko as Minya
- 1963 The Rifleman (TV Series) as Hikaru Yamanaka
- 1964 McHale's Navy as Japanese J.G.
- 1973 Submersion of Japan as Narita
- 1974 Hawaii Five-O as Kayata
- 1975 Six Million Dollar Man (TV Series) as Kuroda
- 1976 Midway as Rear Admiral Tamon Yamaguchi
- 1976 Futureworld as Mr. Takaguchi
- 1980 The Private Eyes as Mr. Uwatsum
- 1980 The Last Flight of Noah's Ark as Cleveland
- 1980 The Octagon as Master Isawa
- 1981 Who Finds a Friend Finds a Treasure as Kamasuka
- 1982 Some Kind of Hero as Captain Tan Tai
- 1982 They Call Me Bruce? as Master
- 1983 The A-Team (TV Series) as General Chow
- 1985 American Ninja as Shinyuki
- 1986 Body Slam as Mr. Kim
- 1987 Steel Dawn as Cord
- 1988 Noble House as Baldhead Kin
- 1988 The Last Samurai as Yasujiro Endo
- 1989 Paint It Black as Mr. Lee
- 1990 Martial Law as Chang
- 1990 Friday the 13th: The Series (TV Series) as Sensei Musashi
- 1991 V.I. Warshawski as Sumitora
- 1992 American Samurai as Tatsuya Sanga
- 1993 American Yakuza as Isshin Tendo
- 1995 Mortal Kombat as Chief Priest
- 1996-1998 Walker, Texas Ranger as Master Rin
- 1997 Tear It Down
- 2001 Pearl Harbor as Nishikura
