= Speaking of the Devil =

- Directed by: Enzo Barboni
- Screenplay by: Marco Barboni
- Story by: Giuseppe Pedersoli
- Produced by: Claudio Bonivento; Giuseppe Pedersoli
- Starring: Bud Spencer; Carol Alt; Thierry Lhermitte
- Cinematography: Alfio Contini
- Edited by: Eugenio Alabiso
- Music by: Giancarlo Bigazzi
- Release date: 1991
- Country: Italy

Speaking of the Devil (Italian as Un piede in paradiso, also known as Standing In Paradise) is a 1991 Italian comedy film directed by Enzo Barboni. It was the last collaboration between Barboni and Bud Spencer with the pairs sons co-writing the film together; Spencer's daughter also plays a role in the film.

The role of Victor was originally intended to be played by Terence Hill, but Hill had to refuse as still being engaged on the set of the Lucky Luke TV series. The film was filmed in Florida.

== Plot ==
Bull Webster is a taxi driver with some work problems on his hands as the Spider Corporation, a giant financial holding company, has decided to buy out his taxi co-operative in order to make it go bankrupt and purchase its land at a low cost. Bull is almost driven to desperation, but then he finds the winning ticket in his pocket to a lottery with the biggest prize of all time as $150 million! With money like that, he can afford to make his enemies eat their plan. But at this point, Bull's future begins to interest those responsible for the destiny of human affairs as Heaven and Hell send an Angel and a Devil to tempt Bull into evil or to convince him to do good. The appearance of these characters in earthly events creates a maze of situations that are amusing, dramatic and full of action. And for once it's the humans, and especially our hero Bull, who come out winning.

== Cast ==
- Bud Spencer as Bull Webster
- Carol Alt as Veronica Flame
- Thierry Lhermitte as Victor
- Ian Bannen as Luzifer
- Jean Sorel as Holy father
- Sharon Madden as Betty
- Sean Arnold as Morrison
- Riccardo Pizzuti as taxi driver (red cab)
- Diamante Spencer as Bull's daughter
