= ... All the Way, Boys! =

... All the Way, Boys! (...più forte ragazzi!)
- Theatrical poster. U.S. release. art by Renato Casaro
- Directed by: Giuseppe Colizzi
- Screenplay by: Giuseppe Colizzi; Barbara Alberti; Amedeo Pagani
- Produced by: Italo Zingarelli
- Starring: Terence Hill; Bud Spencer; Reinhard Kolldehoff; Antoine Saint-John; Cyril Cusack
- Cinematography: Marcello Masciocchi
- Edited by: Antonio Siciliano
- Music by: Guido & Maurizio De Angelis
- Production companies: Delta; Tiger Film
- Distributed by: Delta (Italy); AVCO Embassy Pictures (United States)
- Release dates: December 22, 1972 (Italy); June 1973 (U.S.)
- Running time: 122 min.; 90 min (U.S. version)
- Country: Italy

... All The Way, Boys! (aka Italian: ... Più forte ragazzi! and Plane Crazy) is a 1972 Italian adventure comedy film directed by Giuseppe Colizzi. The film stars the film duo of Terence Hill and Bud Spencer. The duo made 18 films together, often in the Spaghetti Western genre, but ... All The Way, Boys! was the first film set in a modern context, although many other slapstick elements of the earlier films were carried over. (Note: Blackie the Pirate (Italian: Il corsaro nero) (1971) was the first film that the comedy team made that departed from the western formula.)

The film is primarily set in the Amazon rainforest. Two bush pilots crash-land in the rainforest. They soon discover a mining operation within the rainforest, which uses slave labor as miners. They escape with a large emerald, but are imprisoned elsewhere. Following their prison escape, they find themselves targeted by the mine's owner.

== Plot ==
Salud (Bud Spencer) and Plata (Terence Hill) eke out a living as bush pilots in South America. Beside carrying a few passengers and a small amount of cargo, their most lucrative activity is in faking aircraft crashes, on behalf of Salud's brother (Alexander Allerson), who will be able to collect the insurance money.

En route to Santarém, the two pilots crash for real in the middle of the Amazon jungle. In a native village, they meet Matto (Cyril Cusack), an old man who takes Salud to see a mountain and tells him the story of three friends who killed each other. There, the duo find an emerald mining operation run by the unscrupulous Mr. Ears (Reinhard Kolldehoff). Ears dictates prices on the black market, uses thugs to keep out competitors, and keeps his workers as slave labor.

Plata and Salud decide they will confront Ears, using aircraft to deliver their goods, and offering the natives a much better life. Wanting to fly Matto to Salvador, where he would live in a modern city, Plata and Salud take the old man and his dog along with them, but he passes away on the flight. Plata finds a large emerald tied to a cord that Matto wore.

In Salvador, the two inept crooks try to cash in on their find, but end up in jail. After a successful breakout, the pair find themselves pitted against the ruthless Ears, but in the end, right prevails.

== Cast ==
- Terence Hill as Plata
- Bud Spencer as Salud
- Reinhard Kolldehoff as Mr. Ears
- Riccardo Pizzuti as Naso
- Carlos Muñoz as Augusto
- Marcello Verziera as Puncher
- Sergio Bruzzichini as Pilot
- Cyril Cusack as Matto
- Alexander Allerson as Salud's brother
- Ferdinando Murolo as Man in jungle, searching for beer
- Michel Antoine as Daveira
- Antoine Saint-John as One of Mr. Ears gang (as Antoine St. John)

== Production ==
... All the Way, Boys! was shot in Colombia, including scenes set at the Medellín airport. The aircraft that were utilized were: Beechcraft Model 18, Boeing 727, Boeing-Stearman PT-17, Cessna 182 Skylane, Cessna 310, Consolidated PBY-5A Catalina, de Havilland Canada DHC-2 Beaver, Douglas DC-3, Douglas DC-6, Douglas DC-8, Hawker Siddeley HS 748, Lockheed L-188 Electra, Lockheed T-33 and Piper PA-24 Comanche. (Note: Due to his interest in aviation that resulted from ... All the Way, Boys!, Spencer became a jet aircraft and helicopter pilot. He founded Mistral Air in 1984, an air-mail company that also transports pilgrims, but later he sold it to Poste Italiane.)

== Reception ==
In trying to reach a more international audience, the original 120-minute Italian version (... Più forte ragazzi!) of ... All the Way, Boys! was re-edited into a 90-minute version and re-dubbed into English with dialogue and post-synchronization by Gene Luotto. The resultant release did not receive positive reviews, with film Historian Howard Hughes noting that ".. the resultant incoherence doesn't help the sluggish narrative."

Jim Craddock in Videohound's Golden Movie Retriever said, "The "Trinity cast up to no good ... crash-land a plane in the Andes, in the hope of finding slapstick, but found none."

=== Awards ===
... All the Way, Boys! won the Golden Screen award at the 1973 Golden Screen, Germany and the Silver Ribbon for Best Score (Migliore Musica) by Guido De Angelis and Maurizio De Angelis from the Italian National Syndicate of Film Journalists, 1973. (Note: The song "Flying Through The Air" was written by S. Duncan Smith, Guido and Maurizio De Angelis and Carlo Pedersoli; stage name: Bud Spencer.)
