= Two Missionaries =

1974 film

Two Missionaries (Porgi l'altra guancia)
- Italian film poster by Renato Casaro
- Directed by: Franco Rossi
- Written by: Marcello Fondato; Franco Rossi
- Produced by: Dino De Laurentiis
- Starring: Terence Hill; Bud Spencer
- Cinematography: Gábor Pogány
- Edited by: Giorgio Serrallonga
- Music by: Oliver Onions
- Release date: 21 December 1974 (Italy)
- Running time: 95 minutes
- Countries: Italy; France

Two Missionaries (Italian: Porgi l'altra guancia; Turn the Other Cheek) is a 1974 French/Italian international co-production adventure comedy film starring the film duo of Terence Hill and Bud Spencer.

Set in Venezuela, the film depicts two Roman Catholic missionaries who decide to raise parrots on their mission while also defending the poor. The Bishop of Maracaibo considers these two misfits to be the black sheep.

== Synopsis ==
In 1896, Two missionaries (Bud Spencer and Terence Hill) come into conflict with the authorities when they turn their mission into a parrot farm. The Bishop of Maracaibo calls them his 'black sheep,' and the Monsignore has been called to check on their behavior. As usual, our heroes help the poor defend themselves while getting into some funny fistfights in the process.

== Cast ==
- Terence Hill as Father J.
- Bud Spencer as Father Pedro de Leon
- Robert Loggia as Governor Alfonso Felipe Gonzaga
- Jean Pierre Aumont as Monsignor Delgado
- Jacques Herlin as The Bishop
- Mario Pilar as Menendez
- Maria Cumani Quasimodo as Marquise Gonzaga
