= Charleston (1974 film) =

Anche gli angeli tirano di destro
- Directed by: Enzo Barboni
- Starring: Giuliano Gemma; Ricky Bruch
- Cinematography: Francisco Marín
- Music by: Guido & Maurizio De Angelis
- Release date: 1974
- Running time: 111 minutes
- Country: Italy
- Language: Italian

Charleston (original title: Anche gli angeli tirano di destro) is a 1974 Italian buddy comedy film written and directed by Enzo Barboni. The film is the sequel of Even Angels Eat Beans, with Ricky Bruch (at his film debut) who replaced Bud Spencer as Giuliano Gemma's support.

== Cast ==
- Giuliano Gemma: Sonny Abernati
- Ricky Bruch: Rocky
- Dominic Barto: Barabas Smith
- Enzo Fiermonte: Joe Bendaggio
- Edoardo Faieta: Maloney
- Laura Becherelli: Virginia
- Luigi Bonos: Boarding House Owner
- Mario Brega: Barman
- Riccardo Pizzuti: Maloney's Henchman
