= Hannibal (1959 film) =

- Directed by: Carlo Ludovico Bragaglia; Edgar G. Ulmer
- Screenplay by: Mortimer Braus; Sandro Continenza; Edgar G. Ulmer
- Story by: Ottavio Poggi
- Produced by: Ottavio Poggi; Jack Dietz
- Starring: Victor Mature; Gabriele Ferzetti; Rita Gam; Milly Vitale
- Cinematography: Raffaele Masciocchi
- Edited by: Renato Cinquini
- Music by: Carlo Rustichelli
- Production company: Liber Films
- Distributed by: Warner Bros. Pictures
- Release dates: 21 December 1959 (Italy); 18 June 1960 (United States)
- Running time: 95 minutes
- Languages: English; Italian
- Budget: $2.5 million
- Box office: $1,550,000 (US/ Canada)

Hannibal (Italian: Annibale) is a 1959 Italian historical adventure film based on the life of Hannibal, starring Victor Mature in the title role. The film was directed by Edgar G. Ulmer and Carlo Ludovico Bragaglia. It marks the first film pairing of Terence Hill and Bud Spencer under their real names. However they only appear in supporting roles and have no scenes in common.

== Plot ==
The film begins with the Roman Senate hearing about Hannibal (Victor Mature) crossing the Alps with his men and many elephants. The crossing is difficult, with many men dying en route, but they manage to pass through, in part because Hannibal forms an allegiance with a local chieftain.

Hannibal's troops capture Sylvia, niece of Roman senator Fabius Maximus, and she and Hannibal fall in love. Some of Hannibal's troops oppose the match and an unsuccessful attempt is made on Sylvia's life. Hannibal also loses an eye during battle.

Despite the warnings of Fabius, who suggests avoiding battle and waging a campaign of exhaustion, the decision is made to fight Hannibal out in the open. The consequence is a massive Roman defeat at Cannae.

Fabius is recalled to lead the Roman Army and the momentum of Hannibal's campaign begins to wane. His wife and child arrive from Carthage. Sylvia returns to Rome and commits suicide. A postscript informs us that Hannibal fought on for many more years in other lands.

== Cast ==
- Victor Mature as Hannibal
- Gabriele Ferzetti as Fabius Maximus
- Rita Gam as Sylvia
- Milly Vitale as Danila
- Rik Battaglia as Hasdrubal
- Franco Silva as Maharbal
- Terence Hill as Quintilius (billed under his real name, Mario Girotti)
- Mirko Ellis as Mago
- Andrea Aureli as Gajus Terentius Varro
- Andrea Fantasia as Consul Paulus Emilius
- Bud Spencer as Rutario (billed under his real name, Carlo Pedersoli)
- Renzo Cesana
- Mario Pisu
- Enzo Fiermonte

== Production ==
Despite being an Italian production, the film was mainly financed by American studio Warner Bros. Pictures.

Victor Mature signed to make the film with Liber Films of Rome in March 1959. Filming took place in October 1959 with a reported budget of $2.5 million. Edgar Ulmer was the American representative of the company.

The only English speaking actors in the film were Victor Mature and Rita Gam. All the other actors were Italian and had their lines dubbed into English. The film featured approximately 20,000 extras.

The film was originally intended to be a more personal account of Hannibal's life, but the studio instead pressured the film makers into developing a more standard historical film. The film was directed by Edgar G. Ulmer, although IMDb lists Carlo Ludovico Bragaglia as a co-director. The film was released theatrically in the USA on 18 June 1960.

The film existed in two versions, a 95-minute version released in non-English speaking European countries, and a 103-minute version released in the US and other English speaking territories. The film's tagline was "Jump on! Hang on! Here comes the avenging Hannibal and his crazed elephant army!" The film's music was composed by Carlo Rustichelli.

== Release ==
Hannibal was released in Italy on 21 December 1959 and in the United States on 18 June 1960.

== DVD release ==
The film was released on DVD in the USA on October 19, 2004. The DVD includes 16:9 format, a 33-minute interview with Edgar G. Ulmer, a photo and poster gallery, the theatrical trailer, and cast and crew biographies. The DVD contains no subtitles.

== Reception ==
Variety awarded Hannibal a mixed review upon its 1959 release, being critical of the writing and pacing, but praising the spectacle and action sequences, saying: "Although this version of the noted Carthaginian general’s military and romantic activities near Rome in 218 BC is dramatically crude and ponderously paced, it contains enough sheer spectacle, gore and quasi-historical action to excite those still willing to meet such films on their own primitive level."

DVD Talk awarded it a mixed review when it was released on DVD in 2004, giving the film a score of two-and-a-half out of five stars, praising the battle sequences but critising the characterisation, saying "As epics go, Hannibal is neither bad nor particularly memorable, but worth a look for its flashes of imagination".
