= They Call Me Trinity =

1970 film directed by Enzo Barboni and Gene Luotto

- Italian theatrical release poster by Renato Casaro
- Lo chiamavano Trinità...
- Directed by: Enzo Barboni
- Screenplay by: Enzo Barboni
- Story by: Enzo Barboni
- Produced by: Italo Zingarelli
- Starring: Terence Hill; Bud Spencer
- Cinematography: Aldo Giordani
- Edited by: Gianpiero Giunti
- Music by: Franco Micalizzi
- Production company: West Film
- Release dates: December 22, 1970 (Italy); November 4, 1971 (United States)
- Running time: 115 minutes
- Country: Italy
- Box office: 8,742,787 admissions (Italy) $1,208,000

They Call Me Trinity (a.k.a My Name is Trinity) (Italian: Lo chiamavano Trinità...) is a 1970 spaghetti Western comedy film written and directed by Enzo Barboni (under the pseudonym of E.B. Clucher) and produced by Italo Zingarelli. The film stars the duo of Terence Hill and Bud Spencer as half-brothers Trinity and Bambino, who help defend a Mormon settlement from Mexican bandits and the henchmen of the land-grabbing Major Harriman. It was filmed on location in Campo Imperatore, Abruzzo, Italy, with financial backing from West Film.

A sequel, Trinity Is Still My Name, was more successful than They Call Me Trinity. In 1995, Sons of Trinity, starring Heath Kizzier and Keith Neubert, was released as a continuation of the Trinity series.

== Plot ==
Trinity, a lazy, ne'er-do-well gunfighter with unnaturally fast drawing ability and marksmanship, is dragged on a travois by his horse to a way station and restaurant. There, he encounters a pair of bounty hunters with an injured Mexican prisoner. Trinity calmly takes the Mexican away from the two men, killing them before they can shoot him in the back. Trinity reaches a small town, where he witnesses the local sheriff, a large, burly man with a fast draw, gunning down three of Major Harriman's gunmen who demanded the release of an arrested crony.

It becomes apparent that Trinity and the man, Bambino, are brothers. Bambino is merely posing as the new sheriff of the small town while he awaits the arrival of his gang from the penitentiary from which he escaped, following a run-in with the actual sheriff who incidentally took the same way as Bambino on his way to his new post. Bambino is not happy to see his trouble-making brother. However, the two form a temporary partnership to deal with Major Harriman, who is attempting to run a group of pacifist Mormon farmers off their land with the intention of using their property to graze his own horses. The fact that these horses are valuable and unbranded explains Bambino's grudging willingness to work with his little brother, even though he considers Trinity to be a shiftless bum without ambition.

Trinity has fallen in love with two Mormon sisters and is genuinely concerned with the Mormon settlers' welfare. He persuades Bambino and Bambino's henchmen to help train the pacifistic Mormons to fight, and in the final battle, the Mormon leader finds in the Book of Ecclesiastes in the Bible that "there is a time for fighting" and the Mormons are unleashed against Major Harriman's goons, using the dirty fighting tricks that they have just learned.

Bambino is flabbergasted to find that Trinity has branded all of the Major's unbranded horses with the Mormons' brand, legally giving the herd to the farmers and ruining Bambino's plan to steal them for himself. Trinity is about to marry the two Mormon sisters until he realizes that Mormon life involves hard physical labor, prayer, and strict discipline, causing him to hurry after Bambino, who angrily sends him off in the opposite direction. After Bambino departs for California, the real sheriff appears, and Trinity points him in Bambino's direction. Trinity then reclines in his travois and brings up the rear with his horse, following them all.

== Cast ==
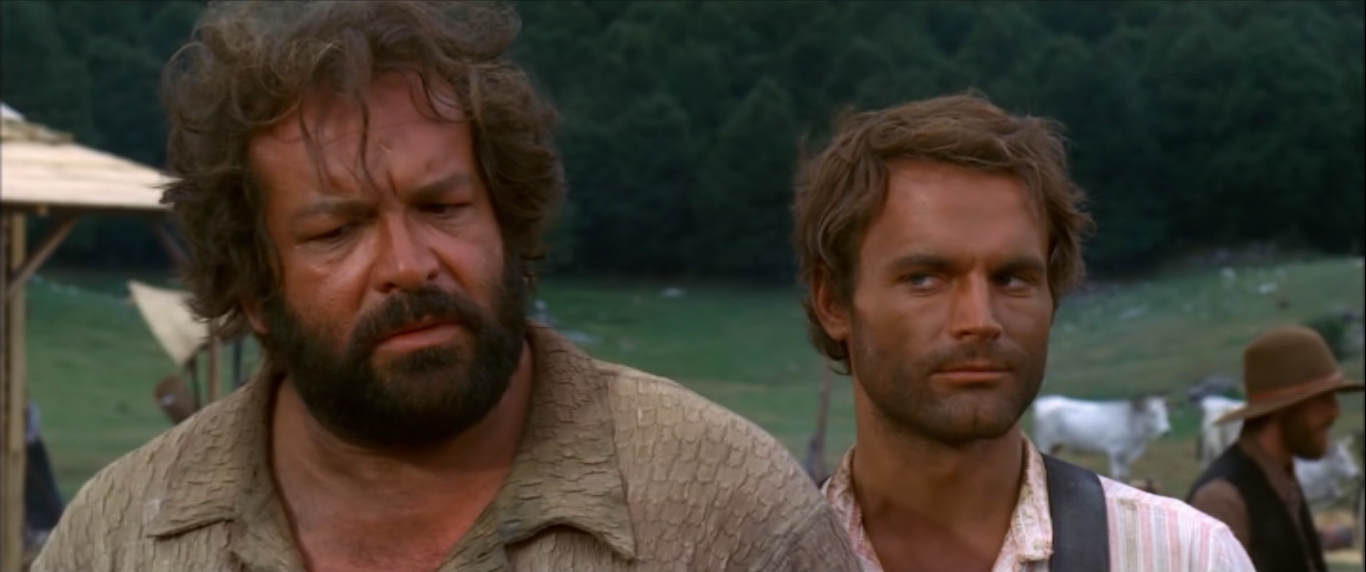
Bud Spencer as Bambino and Terence Hill as Trinity

- Terence Hill as Trinity, "The Right Hand of the Devil"
- Bud Spencer as Bambino, "The Left Hand of the Devil"
- Farley Granger as Major Harriman
- Steffen Zacharias as Jonathan
- Dan Sturkie as Tobias
- Gisela Hahn as Sarah
- Elena Pedemonte as Judith
- Ezio Marano as "Weasel"
- Luciano Rossi as Timid
- Michele Cimarosa as Drunken Mexican
- Ugo Sasso as Crippled Sheriff
- Remo Capitani as Mezcal
- Riccardo Pizzuti as Jeff
- Paolo Magalotti as Harriman Henchman
- Antonio Monselesan as Bounty Hunter
- Gaetano Imbrò as Blond Bounty Hunter
- Gigi Bonos as Ozgur, the Bartender

== Production ==
Director Enzo Barboni wrote the original story and screenplay for the film. Initially, the script only included the Trinity character and not Bambino but producer Italo Zingarelli suggested the inclusion of a brother. When the film was first announced, Peter Martell was set to play Trinity and George Eastman as Bambino. The two characters were later portrayed by Terence Hill and Bud Spencer, who were then a popular comic duo following the release of Western film God Forgives... I Don't! in October 1967 in Italy, where they were cast as comedic and violent characters. Hill and Spencer did their own stunts in the film with the rest of the supporting cast being portrayed predominantly by stuntmen.

Interiors and the towns in the film were shot at Incir De Paolis Studios in Rome. The stage station was shot at Magliana quarry in Lazio, while the valley locations were shot at Parco Dei Monti Simbruini. The waterfall scene was shot at Treja Valley Park.

The main title song was written by Franco Micalizzi and Lally Stott. It is sung by Annibale Giannarelli. "Trinity: Titoli" was later used as the closing theme for Quentin Tarantino's 2012 Western Django Unchained.

According to Hill himself, he fasted for 24 hours in order to shoot the famous beans-eating scene in one take.

== Release ==
They Call Me Trinity was released in Italy just before Christmas 1970. It proved very popular abroad, such as in Spain, where it outgrossed all previous Italian Westerns, save for For a Few Dollars More. The film further proved foundational for future German dubs of Hill and Spencer films: the main dialogue was rewritten to be more humorous, with initially silent areas of the original film receiving additional dialogue from characters with their back to the camera. The film was released in the United States and United Kingdom in 1971. As of 2004, They Call Me Trinity was the 22nd most successful Italian film, one position below The Good, the Bad, and the Ugly.

=== Critical reception ===
Howard Thompson of The New York Times praised the film's sense of humour, as did Roger Ebert, who gave the film two-and-a-half out of four stars. In a review published by Time Out, the film is called "first and best in the Trinity series of spaghetti Westerns, rare in that it is successful in combining laughter and some degree of interest in the action". In his book Once Upon a Time in the Italian West: The Filmgoers' Guide to Spaghetti Westerns, author Howard Hughes writes "They Call Me Trinity is Hill and Spencer's finest vehicle".

== Legacy ==
Following initial popularity, a variety of derivatives were released, such as Two Sons of Trinity and the Carambola! series, the latter of which featured Hill and Spencer lookalikes Michael Coby and Paul L. Smith. Other films using the They Call Me... title include They Call Me Hallelujah (1971), They Call Me Cemetery (1971), They Call Me Holy Ghost (1972), and They Call Me Jeeg (2015).
