= Duel at Sundown (film) =

1965 film

Duell vor Sonnenuntergang
- Directed by: Leopold Lahola
- Written by: Anya Corvin, Leopold Lahola
- Produced by: Leopold Lahola
- Starring: Peter Van Eyck; Wolfgang Kieling; Terence Hill
- Cinematography: Janez Kalisnik Eastmancolor
- Edited by: Wolfgang Wehrum
- Music by: Zvi Borodo
- Production company: Corona Filmproduktion
- Distributed by: Gloria Film
- Release date: 17 September 1965
- Running time: 110 minutes
- Countries: West Germany; Italy
- Language: German

Duel at Sundown (German: Duell vor Sonnenuntergang) is a 1965 West German and Italian western film directed by Leopold Lahola.

== Story ==
During a cattle drive, Don McGow leaves the herd in charge of his younger brother and rides off. When the herd is reported stolen he blames himself and goes in search of the thieves only to discover it is his brother.

== Cast ==
- Peter van Eyck as Don McGow
- Carole Gray as Nancy Parker/Greenwood
- Wolfgang Kieling as Punch Parker/Greenwood
- Terence Hill as Mario Girotti as Larry McGow
- Carl Lange as Pastor
- Walter Barnes as Pa McGow
- Jan Hendriks as Lord
- Todd Martin as Smokey Jim
- Giacomo Rossi-Stuart as Quents
- Klaus Dahlen as Baby Face
- Demeter Bitenc as Mack
- Kurt Heintel as Sheriff
- Slobodan Dimitrijevic as Ft. Clark rancher
