= March or Die (film) =

1977 film

- Theatrical release poster by Tom Jung
- Directed by: Dick Richards
- Screenplay by: David Zelag Goodman
- Story by: David Zelag Goodman; Dick Richards
- Produced by: Jerry Bruckheimer; Dick Richards
- Starring: Gene Hackman; Terence Hill; Max von Sydow; Ian Holm; Catherine Deneuve
- Cinematography: John Alcott
- Edited by: Stanford C. Allen; O. Nicholas Brown; John C. Howard
- Music by: Maurice Jarre
- Production company: ITC Entertainment
- Distributed by: Columbia Pictures (through Columbia-Warner Distributors)
- Release dates: 5 August 1977 (US); 13 October 1977 (UK)
- Running time: 104 minutes
- Countries: United Kingdom; United States
- Language: English
- Budget: $8 million
- Box office: $3,243,088 (US); 373,848 admissions (France)

March or Die is a 1977 historical adventure war film directed, produced, and co-written by Dick Richards. Set during the Rif War in Morocco during the early 1920s, the film centers on the conflicts between the French Foreign Legion and the revolutionary forces of Abd El Krim. It stars Gene Hackman, Terence Hill, Catherine Deneuve, Max von Sydow and Ian Holm.

The film centers on a group of Legionnaires led by Major Foster (Hackman), a war-weary American haunted by his memories of the recently ended Great War, who are assigned to protect a group of archaeologists at a dig site in Erfoud from Bedouin revolutionaries led by El Krim.

The film was produced by Lew Grade's ITC Entertainment. It was released in the United States by Columbia-Warner Distributors on August 5, 1977, and in the United Kingdom on October 13.

== Plot ==
Soon after the Great War, Major William Foster, an American commander in the French Foreign Legion, suffers the haunting memories of leading an army of more than 8,000 men and watching them slowly get whittled down to just 200. He has become an alcoholic as a result, and his only friend is his faithful Sergeant, Triand.

Foster arrives in Paris to assume a new command: taking the Legion to Rif in Morocco to re-establish French authority, as the Bedouin and Berber tribes have begun to revolt against French rule. Foster is also ordered to escort archaeologists from the Louvre, who are uncovering an ancient city near Erfoud, buried by a sandstorm 3,000 years ago. The site is the final resting place of a Berber saint known to the French as "The Angel of the Desert". Foster was specifically chosen for the assignment as he is the only French officer alive who served in Morocco before the war. He had helped to develop diplomatic ties with the tribes by negotiating with El Krim, the de facto leader of the scattered Rif tribes; one condition of peace was that the French cease all archaeological expeditions without the tribes' approval.

Foster receives fresh Legion recruits for his assignment. Among those who volunteer, willingly or unwillingly, is Marco "the Gypsy" Segrain, a charming jewel thief famous for a three-year crime spree on the Riviera before getting arrested. Gypsy befriends three other recruits: the Russian giant Ivan, formerly a member of the elite bodyguard of the deposed Russian Imperial family; François "Top Hat" Gilbert, a fashionable man and musician who lacks the physical traits needed in a soldier; and Frederick Hastings, a romantic young English aristocrat who longs for the days of the Great War.

The four friends are soon disillusioned by the harsh realities of life in the Legion, including heavy physical labor, little food and water, and scorching heat. A fatal fight breaks out among the men while traveling to Morocco over an insult to Foster's honor, to which Triand takes exception. Foster does not hesitate to harshly discipline his men, especially the insubordinate Marco, though he makes sure never to go too far and actively works to make sure his men are fit and ready for the hardships ahead. During the voyage, Marco charms one of the accompanying archaeologists, Madame Picard.

During their journey, the train carrying the Legionnaires and the archaeological team is stopped by El Krim and his men. El Krim greets his old friend Foster, but also declares that Morocco belongs to his people and the French are no longer welcome. El Krim gives a "gift" to Foster to take back to the Premier of France: the archaeologists of an earlier dig, who have had their eyes and tongues gouged out and been subjected to exposure. He warns Foster to turn back while he still can. In response, Foster shoots the two mutilated archaeologists to end their suffering; afterwards, it is revealed that one of them was Madame Picard's father.

Upon reaching their fortress, Foster puts the men through brutal and unforgiving training exercises. Top Hat collapses during a march and is left to die of thirst but manages to return to camp; he ultimately commits suicide rather than endure any further abuse. Later, at the digging site, Hastings is kidnapped while on guard duty and tortured to death by a tribal raider, whom El Krim excuses as being merely over-zealous. Marco retaliates by killing his friend's murderer. Instead of disciplining him, Foster defends him by using the same excuse, and El Krim accepts it.

Eventually, the tomb of the Angel of the Desert is found, and her golden sarcophagus is excavated. Foster offers it to El Krim as a token of peace, but El Krim rallies the warriors of the Bedouin tribes to slaughter the Europeans. The well-trained Legionaries shoot down hundreds of tribesmen but are eventually overrun. Ivan is killed, but Marco fights on, single-handedly killing multiple enemies trying to outflank his unit. When Foster is finally shot dead, El Krim immediately calls off the fight, sending the surviving Legionnaires "to tell the world what happened" and allowing them to take Foster and the remains of their fellow soldiers back home.

Some time later, Marco, promoted for his bravery in battle, trains more Legionnaire recruits, welcoming them by reiterating Foster's earlier warning: "If the Legion doesn't get you, the desert will. If the desert doesn't, the Arabs will. And if the Arabs don't, then I will. I don't know which is worse."

== Cast ==
- Gene Hackman as Major William Sherman Foster
- Terence Hill as Marco Segrain
- Catherine Deneuve as Simone Picard
- Max von Sydow as François Marneau
- Ian Holm as Abd El Krim
- Jack O'Halloran as Ivan
- Rufus as Sergeant Triand
- Marcel Bozzuffi as Lieutenant Fontaine
- Liliane Rovère as Lola
- Andre Penvern as François "Top Hat" Gilbert
- Paul Sherman as Fred Hastings
- Vernon Dobtcheff as Mean Corporal
- Marne Maitland as Leon
- Gigi Bonos as Andre
- Wolf Kahler as Rudolf
- Jean Champion as Minister
- Walter Gotell as Colonel Lamont
- Guy Deghy as Ship's captain
- Jean Rougerie as Legionnaire at station
- Eve Brenner as Singing Girl
- Margaret Modlin as Lady In Black

== Production ==
=== Development and casting ===
Dick Richards had been interested in the French Foreign Legion ever since he found out a friend of his uncle's had been a member.

Most of the finance was provided by Lew Grade's ITC Company on the basis of Terence Hill's popularity. It was Hill's second film aimed at the American market, after Mr. Billion. The film includes several of the same crew as ITC's previous production Farewell, My Lovely, including director Richards, producer Jerry Bruckheimer, and screenwriter David Zelag Goodman.

Marcel Bozzuffi was cast as the sadistic Lt. Fontaine at Gene Hackman's suggestion, after the two worked together in The French Connection.

=== Filming ===
Filming started 23 August 1976. Shooting took place in Morocco, Spain, and Arizona.

Hackman was injured during filming after he was thrown off a horse. This caused filming to be suspended.

=== Music ===
The score was composed by Maurice Jarre and performed by the National Philharmonic Orchestra and the French Republican Guard Band.

The song "Plaisir d'amour", a tune about lost love and regret, is played repeatedly throughout the story as the film's theme song.

== Release ==
Columbia Pictures only agreed to distribute in the US because they wanted to distribute Grade's The Eagle Has Landed. In most markets, March or Die played theatres in a double-bill with Eagle.

== Reception ==
According to Lew Grade, the film "went well over budget when Gene Hackman suffered an accident, and lost money" at the box office.

== Television version ==
In the TV version, there were several scenes that were not included in the theatrical or in the video/DVD versions of the film.

One pivotal extra scene occurs when the excavation work has commenced and it is discovered that two of the Legionaries, both of them German recruits, have deserted. The sadistic second-in-command of the company, Lt. Fontaine and his equally vicious crony, the Corporal, lead a patrol to capture them. They catch up with the two Germans and Fontaine orders the patrol to shoot them. The noise attracts a large group of Bedouin tribesmen and, disregarding the warnings from his men, Fontaine orders his men to open fire, igniting a battle. The Corporal is shot dead and Fontaine breaks down in fear and kills himself. Marco displays his courage and natural flair for leadership by rallying the survivors of the patrol and successfully beating off the attackers.

In the video release, this scene was omitted but brief shots of Fontaine and the Corporal were taken from this scene and edited into the climactic battle at the digging site so it appears that both men died there instead.

The TV version has an alternate ending, with Marco taking up Picard's offer to desert the Legion and leave with her

== See also ==
- Legionnaire, a 1998 film starring Jean-Claude Van Damme, uses a similar plot.
