= Who Finds a Friend Finds a Treasure =

1981 film directed by Sergio Corbucci

- Theatrical release poster by Renato Casaro
- Directed by: Sergio Corbucci
- Screenplay by: Amendola & Corbucci
- Produced by: Josi W. Konski
- Starring: Terence Hill; Bud Spencer
- Cinematography: Luigi Kuveiller
- Music by: La Bionda
- Release date: 10 December 1981
- Running time: 114 minutes
- Countries: Italy; United States
- Language: English

Who Finds a Friend Finds a Treasure (Italian: Chi trova un amico trova un tesoro also known as A Friend Is a Treasure) is a 1981 Italian adventure comedy film, directed by Sergio Corbucci and starring the film duo of Terence Hill and Bud Spencer. It was filmed at Key Biscayne, Florida.

In the film, a runaway gambler and an actor are accidentally stranded on an isolated Pacific island. They protect the natives from pirates, and steal American money from a Japanese holdout. They then have to permanently defeat the pirate forces in combat. They are rescued by the United States Navy, and return the stolen money to the Americans. Left broke after their adventures, they are seen planning a museum heist by the end of the film.

== Plot ==
Alan Lloyd is an inveterate gambler who accumulates a lot of debt and therefore is forced to flee, pursued by shady employers in the area. Charlie O'Brien is an actor who is hired to advertise a jam (that tastes horrible) and is embarking on a long promotional boat trip. Alan, still fleeing, hides inside Charlie's boat behind his back.

After Alan is discovered, the two get into a fight and fall out of the boat, eventually reaching a remote island in the Pacific. There, the two initially believe they are on a deserted island, but then discover that it is inhabited and familiarize themselves with the natives. The welcome party is interrupted by a group of pirates who come each year to capture some natives to sell them as slaves, but they do not know that Alan and Charlie are there now. After a lot of punches and blows the pirates are expelled.

The two friends and the natives celebrate and make peace with an old Japanese general in a fort on the island who still believes that World War II is not over. The man receives Alan and Charlie in his bunker and shows them a huge amount of money (stolen from the United States Navy during the war) that he kept hidden for years. Charlie is crazy with joy and secretly steals all the money, while the general confides to Alan that the money is all fake.

Charlie plans to leave with an old plane but the pirates inadvertently come back to the island more aggressive and with the incursion of a group of criminals who had the honor to clash with Alan at the beginning of the story. The natives are captured and humiliated, so Alan and Charlie, who had gone off (without the latter having discovered the secret of fake money), come back, swoop down with the plane on the attackers and fight their enemies in a battle to the sound of blows and punches, finally defeating them and bringing lasting peace to the island.

Finally Alan and Charlie are rescued by the crew of USS Forrestal. They give the fake money to the navy, only to be told that it is real (the government spread the tale the money was fake to prevent the Japanese from spending it). They get hailed as heroes but end up without any money and a hand-made idol (a gift from the grateful natives for Alan and Charlie) ends up donated to a museum.

In the final scene, we see the idol in a museum with a card saying that it is worth a fortune and Alan and Charlie working as janitors.

== Cast ==
- Terence Hill: Alan Lloyd
- Bud Spencer: Charlie O'Brien
- Sal Borgese: Anulu
- John Fujioka: Kamasuka, a Japanese holdout
- Louise Bennett: Mama
- Tom Tully: Marine Captain

== See also ==
- List of Italian films of 1981
