= Enzo Barboni =

Italian filmmaker (1922–2002)

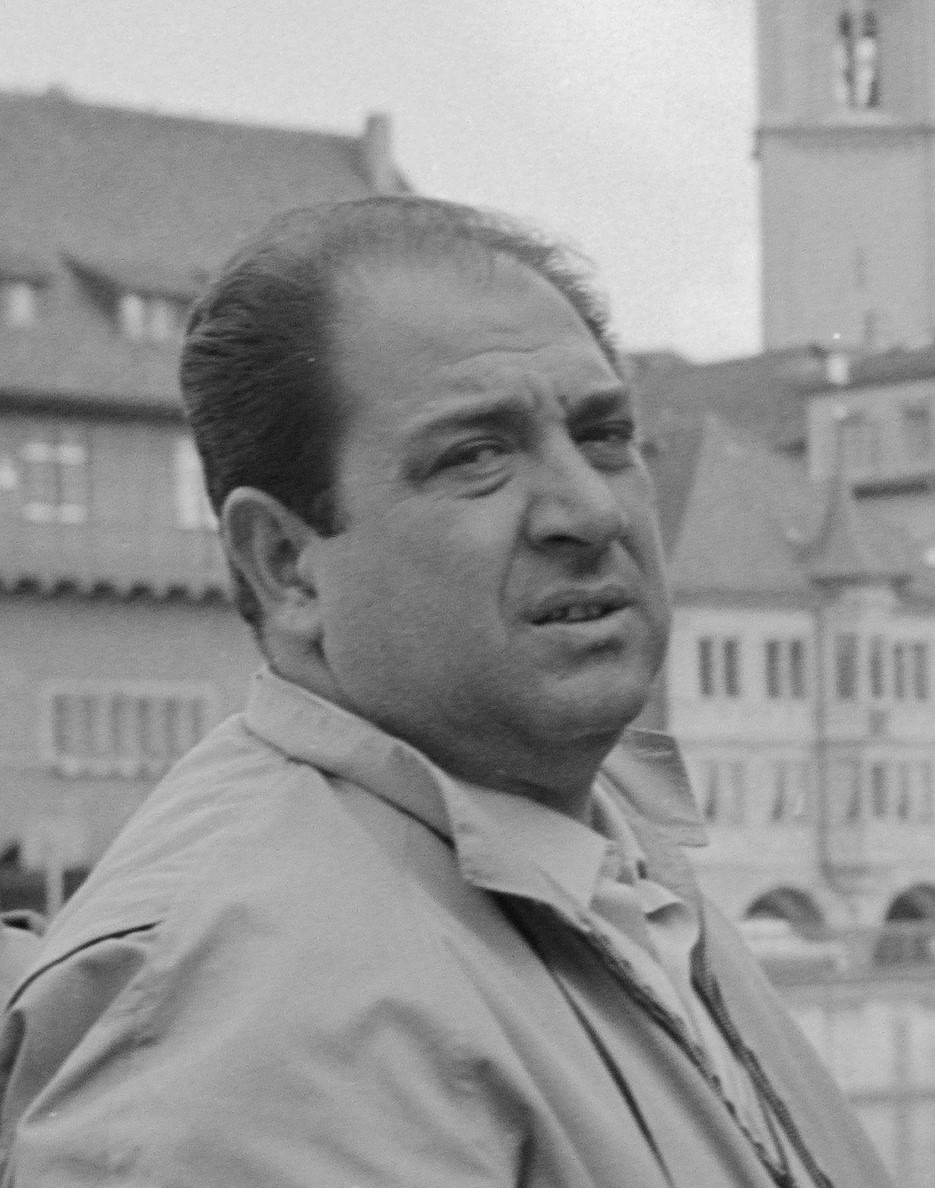
- Enzo Barboni in 1961
- Born: 10 July 1922; Rome, Kingdom of Italy
- Died: 23 March 2002 (aged 79); Rome, Italy
- Other names: E.B. Clucher (pseudonym)
- Occupations: film director cinematographer screenwriter

Enzo Barboni (7 July 1922 – 23 March 2002), sometimes credited by his pseudonym E.B. Clucher; the surname of his grandmother, was an Italian film director, cinematographer and screenwriter, best known for his slapstick comedies starring Terence Hill and Bud Spencer.

== Biography ==
Barboni was born in Rome. He began to work in film at a very young age, serving as a war correspondent on Eastern Front of World War II, and starting work as a camera operator in 1942. In 1961 he advanced to a career as cinematographer, working several times with director Sergio Corbucci and gaining a high reputation.

He made his directorial debut in 1970 with the serious western Chuck Moll, which had little success. Undaunted, he decided to make his next film a slapstick parody of the Spaghetti Western phenomenon. The result, They Call Me Trinity, was an enormous hit and made superstars out of Bud Spencer and Terence Hill. The three reunited the next year for the even more successful sequel Trinity Is STILL My Name!, which became, up to that point, the highest grossing Italian movie ever.

Barboni never strayed from his successful formula; his subsequent films were all slapstick comedies and almost all featured either Hill or Spencer. This collaboration produced numerous hits, but when Hill and Spencer's careers started to wane, so did Barboni's. In 1994 he wanted to direct Troublemakers, which was to be the "swan song" of the duo, but Terence Hill insisted on directing instead. The next year Barboni tried to revive the formula with Sons of Trinity, which proved to be a disaster at the box-office.

After this disappointment, Barboni retired. He died in Rome, at age 79.

== Selected filmography as cinematographer ==
- Il microfono è vostro (1951)
- Duel of the Titans (1961)
- The Two Marshals (1961)
- Totò diabolicus (1961)
- The Slave (1962)
- Lo smemorato di Collegno (1962)
- The Four Monks (1962)
- The Shortest Day (1962)
- Il monaco di Monza (1963)
- Gidget Goes to Rome (1963)
- Gli onorevoli (1963)
- Massacre at Grand Canyon (1964)
- Erik, the Viking (1965)
- Son of the Leopard (1965)
- Nightmare Castle (1965)
- Hercules and the Princess of Troy (1965)
- Three Coins in the Fountain (filmed in 1966, released in 1970)
- The Man Who Laughs (1966)
- Django (1966)
- Texas, Adios (1966)
- The Ugly Ones (1966)
- The Hellbenders (1967)
- Io non protesto, io amo (1967)
- Rita of the West (1967)
- Train for Durango (1968)
- Django, Prepare a Coffin (1968)
- I Live for Your Death (1968)
- Assignment to Kill (1968)
- Man Who Cried for Revenge (1968)
- Franco e Ciccio... Ladro e Guardia (1969)
- The Five Man Army (1969)
- Kemek (1970)

== Selected filmography as director ==
- The Unholy Four (1970)
- They Call Me Trinity (1970)
- Trinity Is Still My Name (1971)
- Man of the East (1972)
- Even Angels Eat Beans (1974)
- Crime Busters (1977)
- Odd Squad (1981)
- Go for It (1983)
- Double Trouble (1984)
- They Call Me Renegade (1987)
- Speaking of the Devil (1991)
- Sons of Trinity (1995)
