= Watch Out, We're Mad! =

- Original DVD cover; art by Renato Casaro
- Italian: ...altrimenti ci arrabbiamo!
- Directed by: Marcello Fondato
- Written by: Marcello Fondato; Francesco Scardamaglia
- Produced by: Mario Cecchi Gori
- Starring: Terence Hill; Bud Spencer
- Cinematography: Arturo Zavattini
- Edited by: Sergio Montanari; Alfonso Santacana
- Music by: Oliver Onions
- Distributed by: Columbia Pictures (US)
- Release dates: 29 March 1974 (Italy); May 1976 (US)
- Running time: 101.5 minutes
- Countries: Italy; Spain

Watch Out, We're Mad! (Italian: ...altrimenti ci arrabbiamo!) is a 1974 Italian-Spanish action comedy film, directed by Marcello Fondato and starring the film duo of Terence Hill and Bud Spencer. It was a co-production between Italy and Spain.

In the film, two rival race car drivers win shared ownership over a dune buggy in a race. When the buggy is wrecked due to the indirect orders of a profiteer, they demand a replacement buggy. When their opponent decides to send a henchman against them, their argument escalates into violent conflict.

== Plot ==
Somewhere in Spain, off-road race car driver Ben is anticipating the next rallycross race, because of the prize: a red Puma dune buggy with a yellow top. However, he does not count on "The Kid" entering the competition, who also has a talent for the sport and an eye on that same dune buggy. During the race, each man battles furiously to the finish line. But in a surprise finish, they both end up tying for first place, and dash for the buggy, reaching it at the same time. As a result, they are both awarded the dune buggy.

Of course, sharing is out of the question, so they soon get into a serious discussion as who gets the buggy, at first suggesting betting it in a game of cards, and then arm-wrestling. Finally they decide on a "beer and hot-dog" eating contest in the funfair's pub, in which "the first one that gives up loses the car and pays the tab".

The challenge is roughly interrupted by men working for "The Boss", a building profiteer that wants to demolish Luna Park so he can replace it with a skyscraper, who proceed to tear up the beerhouse and threaten the customers. Ben and Kid agree to take their contest elsewhere, but when ordered by one of them to leave the car under the threat of destroying it, Ben and Kid dismiss him and drive away, which results in the buggy being rammed by another car, wrecking it.

Resolute to reclaim a new buggy, the two barge into the Boss' restaurant during a dance party, and demand that he replace the buggy, otherwise they'll "get mad". After the two leave, the boss is inclined to buy them a new buggy to compensate them, but is discouraged by the "Doctor", a German-born Freudian psychologist: he believes that Ben and Kid are two "spoiled children" that think the boss is the "father figure". To give in to their demand would be a bad psychological fallout. The Doctor exalts the Boss' wickedness, goading him into dealing with the two, and the Boss sends his henchman Attila after them, spraying gasoline onto Ben's car and lighting it aflame, though they are able to put it out by driving into a nearby car wash.

Feeling that he didn't get their point, Kid moves on to persuade the Boss to give them the dune buggy, with Ben reluctantly tagging along, partially due to him wanting to study his part for the choir. The first attempt ends with an all-out brawl in the fairgrounds' gym, where the two beat up Attila and his henchmen, which in turn infuriates the Boss enough to send a motorcycle gang after them.

After a chase scene through a nearby forest area and the motorcycle gang being disposed of, the Doctor persuades the Boss to send Paganini, a highly skilled assassin from the Chicago Underworld, after them. The assassin confronts the two, although both manage to evade his attempts, with Kid luring him away from Ben's place and to the auditorium where the choir Ben is a part of is in. This culminates in a confrontation right in the middle of the repetition of the choir, which eventually results in Ben getting kicked out, despite the assassin himself being caught by Kid and forced at gunpoint to play a violin in the Boss' restaurant. Infuriated, the Boss is about to use his trademark punishment where he stabs his fork into the hands of his henchmen on the Doctor, only for him to suggest to target Jeremias, Ben's assistant and a former cook who worked for the Boss, instead, insisting that he is the mastermind behind their actions.

After Ben sends Kid away from having him kicked out of the choir, he finds Jeremias beaten up and injured in his garage, who mentions he was attacked by the Boss's men. Angered, he heads directly to the boss' restaurant to confront him, where the Kid meets up with him. After being turned away by the doorman, Ben and Kid force their way into the restaurant using Ben's car and demolish it as they drive through inside, after which they have a massive brawl against Boss' henchmen.

In the end, the Boss finally has had enough and presents Ben and Kid with not one, but two of the dune buggies they had been wanting, one for each of them. But as they have fun with the buggies, the Kid gets distracted by the female employee of the funfair he had taken interest in, Liza, resulting in him crashing and destroying Ben's buggy. As Ben watches the burning wreckage, Kid sits next to him, and the pair talk over what to do to decide who gets the remaining buggy.

== Cast ==
- Terence Hill as Kid
- Bud Spencer as Ben
- John Sharp as the Boss
- Donald Pleasence as the Doctor
- Deogracias Huerta as Attila
- Luis Barbero as Jeremias
- Patty Shepard as Liza
- Manuel de Blas as Paganini
- Emilio Laguna as the conductor of the choir
- Rafael Albaicín
- Giancarlo Bastianoni as Gymnast
- Roberto Alessandri
- Ada Pometti as Pretty Girl 1
- Jose Yepes
- Ines Morales as Pretty Girl 2
- Jose Luis Lizalde
- Omero Capanna as Thug at Party
- Giovanni Cianfriglia as Boxer in Gymnasium
- Rémy Julienne as Thug on Motorbike
- Rocco Lerro as Gymnast
- Manuel Mateos
- Franco Moruzzi as Gymnast
- José Panizo as Bingo
- Osiride Pevarello as Gymnast
- José Santa Cruz as Lefty
- Pietro Torrisi as Gymnast
- Franco Ukmar as Gymnast
- Marcello Verziera as Boxer in Gymnasium

== Remake ==
In 2022, a remake of the film with the same title was released.
