= Keith Neubert =

American football player

No. 86
- Position: Tight end

Personal information
- Born: Fort Atkinson, Wisconsin, U.S.
- Listed height: 6 ft 5 in (1.96 m)
- Listed weight: 250 lb (113 kg)

Career information
- High school: Fort Atkinson
- College: Nebraska
- NFL draft: 1988: 8th round, 203rd overall pick

Career history
- New York Jets (1988–1989); Green Bay Packers (1991)*; Philadelphia Eagles (1992)
- * Offseason or practice squad member only

Career NFL statistics
- Receptions: 28
- Receiving yards: 302
- Touchdowns: 1
- Stats at Pro Football Reference

Keith Robert Neubert is an American former professional football player who was a tight end in the National Football League (NFL). After playing college basketball and football for the Nebraska Cornhuskers, he played in the NFL for the New York Jets from 1988 to 1990 and the Philadelphia Eagles from 1992 to 1993. He is also a television host, producer, writer, director, and actor.

== Early life and career ==
Neubert was born in Fort Atkinson, Wisconsin. He played college football and basketball at the University of Nebraska–Lincoln from 1984 to 1988, earning varsity letters in both and received a communications-journalism degree. After playing four years of basketball, competing in the NCAA Tournament and NIT Final Four at Madison Square Garden during his hoops career, Neubert joined the Nebraska football team as a TE for his senior season. After playing just one year of football, he was selected by the NFL's New York Jets.

== Football ==
Selected by the New York Jets in the eighth round of the 1988 NFL draft, he played in the NFL for five years until he was injured in 1992. Standout NFL game performances include NY Jets vs Pittsburgh Steelers with 6 receptions for 40 yards, at LA Rams with 4 receptions for 63 yards and a TD, 4 receptions for 53 yards vs Miami Dolphins, and NY Jets vs New England Patriots with 5 receptions for 66 yards in a dramatic comeback win.

NFL FILMS LINK: https://www.youtube.com/watch?v=I3tbAdrq0Bk

== Television and film ==
As an actor, he debuted in the lead role in the Italian western Trinity feature film series sequel, Sons of Trinity. He appeared in secondary roles in Tom Hanks' directorial debut film That Thing You Do! and in The Drew Carey Show, Becker, The Closer, Wings, Bittersweet, Melrose Place, Air America, High Tide, Puppet and had recurring roles on Baywatch, The Young and the Restless and Two Guys and a Girl sitcom with Ryan Reynolds.

Keith Neubert is a television host and filmmaker known for his extensive work across multiple genres, most notably adventure, natural history and wildlife conservation. With a career spanning multiple roles in the entertainment industry, he has hosted popular television series and specials, including the History Channel's competition reality series, Picked Off and National Geographic International's Expedition China: Search for Shangri la series now on Discovery Plus (US) and PBS (US), the American Explorer series for Mark Cuban's HDNet (AXS TV), and various programs for Scripps and HGTV. In addition to his presenting duties, Keith has contributed creatively behind the camera as an award-winning filmmaker. With extensive experience in film and television and a degree in journalism, Neubert sold his first television script to FX, which commissioned a pilot for a dramatic series and led to his qualification for membership in both the Writers Guild of America and the Producers Guild of America. He has since directed and produced a broad range of television series and documentary films for major broadcast and cable networks, demonstrating versatility across investigative, documentary, unscripted and entertainment programming. Neubert's work includes Unsettled, Stolen Lives, Vision: Elon Musk's Story, Foul Play: Athletes Speak Out, RFK JR: Uncensored, Wild Rescue, Battle Dogs, American Xplorer, Man Kitchen, Expedition China: Search for Shangri la, With Love and Respect: Vince Lombardi's Green Bay Packers, Extreme Rescue: Passage to Freedom, and The Pit.
