= Crime Busters =

1977 film by Enzo Barboni

- Theatrical release poster by Renato Casaro
- Directed by: Enzo Barboni
- Screenplay by: Enzo Barboni
- Starring: Terence Hill; Bud Spencer; David Huddleston; Luciano Catenacci
- Cinematography: Claudio Cirillo
- Edited by: Eugenio Alabiso
- Music by: Guido and Maurizio De Angelis
- Production companies: Tritone Cinematografica; TOTA
- Release date: April 7, 1977
- Running time: 109 minutes
- Country: Italy

Crime Busters (Italian: I due superpiedi quasi piatti) is a 1977 Italian action crime comedy film directed by Enzo Barboni and starring the film duo of Terence Hill and Bud Spencer.

It was one of the three films awarded with the Golden Screen Award in 1977 along with The Exorcist and The Towering Inferno.

The film is set in Miami. Two unemployed men decide to jointly rob a supermarket. They instead volunteer to work as police officers, in order to evade arrest. Following their graduation for training, they confront a local trafficking gang.

== Plot ==
Wilbur Walsh (Bud Spencer) and Matt Kirby (Terence Hill) are in Miami, looking for work as longshoremen. The area is managed by shady dealers who refuse to give them a job. The dealers are beaten up and have three of their cars wrecked in the process. Walsh and Kirby meet up and then leave the dock, tired of looking for a job. Matt is particularly intrigued by the closed nature of Wilbur, who tries to avoid it in any way.

Matt, after introducing himself, suggests that Walsh and he should work together on something he had been planning; the robbery of a supermarket. Walsh accepts, aided by Kirby's conniving ways to remove police attention, but by mistake, the two end up in the police station and, to prevent being locked away, they say that they want to become police officers, which is granted.

Both Kirby and Walsh complete their training, even though they differ in their unorthodox methods of making arrests and overall rebellious nature, eventually being on real service. During their job, Kirby becomes familiar with a Chinese family whose uncle was killed by unknown assailants. Upon investigation, the two come to face the same ruffians that spread to the port and denied them a job before. The criminals will be the key to "the two super feet almost flat" to get to the heart of the gang of traffickers.

== Cast ==
- Bud Spencer as Wilbur Walsh
- Terence Hill as Matt Kirby
- David Huddleston as Captain McBride
- Luciano Catenacci as Fred Clyne
- Riccardo Pizzuti as Fred's Henchman
- Jill Flanter as Galina Kocilova
- April Clough as Angie Crawford
- Laura Gemser as Susy Lee
- Ezio Marano as Bloodsucker
- Luciano Rossi as Geronimo
- Luigi Casellato as Drugstore Owner
- Edy Biagetti as Lieutenant Governor
- Giancarlo Bastianoni
- Claudio Ruffini as Thug
- Roberto Messina
- Rocco Lerro
- Roberto Del Acqua
- Giovanni Ukmar
- Duilio Olmi
- Emilio Delle Piane as Pierre, Fred's Waiter
- Giovanni Cianfriglia
- Fortunato Arena as Bouncer At Bowling
- Ottaviano Dell'Acqua as Geronimo's Man
- Omero Capanna as Hitman
- William Conroy as Man
- John DiSanti as Orderly
- Alex Edlin as Puncher In Football Stadium
- Frank Nuyen as Mr. Lee
- Osiride Pevarello as Circus Man
- Pietro Torrisi as Fred's Henchman

== Reception ==
In a contemporary review, Monthly Film Bulletin called Crime Busters "a singularly dull variation on the sprightly, sparring Newman/Redford comedy formula" and that there are a few original ideas in the script, but they were "largely wasted by the lacklustre direction and the film's inevitable drift into an endless series of unimaginatively choreographed punch-ups."

From retrospective reviews, AllMovie called the film "light but likeable stuff" and that the appeal of the film depends "solely on one's opinion of Hill and Spencer's antics." The review also noted supporting roles, noting David Huddleston and Laura Gemser. The review concluded that the film was "shaggy around the edges but fans of slapstick humor will find it endearing enough to pull them through."
