= Picked Off =

- Genre: Reality competition
- Presented by: Keith Neubert
- Judges: Todd Merrill; Ethan Merrill
- Country of origin: United States
- Original language: English
- No. of seasons: 1
- No. of episodes: 6

Production
- Executive producers: Mark Poertner; Stephen Pettinger; Susan Werbe
- Editor: Julie Cooper
- Production company: Cineflix Productions

Original release
- Network: History
- Release: July 11 – August 15, 2012

Picked Off is an American reality competition television series on History. The series premiered on July 11, 2012, and is hosted by Keith Neubert. The judges are collectibles experts Todd and Ethan Merrill.

== Gameplay ==
Four teams of two people meet up at an antiques barn in southern Mississippi, where they determine the value of an antique or collectible item without going over, similar to the "One Bid" preliminaries on The Price Is Right.

The winner of this opening round gets a 15-minute head start on the next round, where the contestants visit a certain venue (usually located within a short driving distance from the home base) and, within a certain time period, find and take back an item they feel would be worth the most money. Todd and Ethan then judge the items and determines their value; the contestant with the lowest-valued item among the others is "picked off"—in other words, eliminated from the competition.

The next round features the three remaining teams visiting three different leads as selected by the host, with their spending limit fixed to the value of the item appraised in the previous round; like before, they try to find the highest-valued item, with the contestant with the lowest-valued item "picked off" the competition.

In the final round, the two remaining teams scour a given geographic area, in which they have a certain period of time to look for the most-valued item, limited to the value appraised of the previous item; the contestants can use the same leads as the previous round, and/or find leads on their own. The team with the top-valued item after this round wins the top prize of $10,000 cash.

== Episodes ==
No.	Title	Original release date	US viewers (millions)
1	"Cagey Strategy"	July 11, 2012	2.290
2	"What the Early Bird Catches"	July 18, 2012	1.625
3	"Outside the Box"	July 25, 2012	1.751
4	"Radio Fight"	August 1, 2012	1.211
5	"Firemen to the Rescue"	August 8, 2012	1.090
6	"Battle in the Big Easy"	August 15, 2012	1.857

== See also ==
- American Pickers
