= Heath Kizzier =

American actor (born 1967)

- Born: August 3, 1967 (age 58); Rapid City, South Dakota, United States
- Occupation: Actor
- Years active: 1993-present

Heath Kizzier (born August 3, 1967) is an American actor. He is best known for his role as Joshua Landers in the CBS soap opera The Young and the Restless.

== Selected filmography ==
Year	Title	Role	Notes
1993	Dr. Quinn, Medicine Woman	Joe Benjamin	Episode: "Saving Souls"
1994	Murder, She Wrote	Deputy Sutton	Episode: "Roadkill"
1995	Sons of Trinity	Trinity	
1996–98	The Young and the Restless	Joshua Landers	
1998	Air America	Peter McCormack	Episode: "Rebound"
