= Mr. Billion =

1977 film by Jonathan Kaplan

- Theatrical release poster
- Directed by: Jonathan Kaplan
- Written by: Ken Friedman; Jonathan Kaplan
- Produced by: Steven Bach; Ken Friedman
- Starring: Terence Hill; Valerie Perrine; Slim Pickens; William Redfield; Chill Wills; Jackie Gleason
- Cinematography: Matthew Leonetti
- Edited by: O. Nicholas Brown
- Music by: Dave Grusin
- Production company: Pantheon Pictures
- Distributed by: 20th Century Fox
- Release date: March 3, 1977
- Running time: 89 minutes
- Country: United States
- Language: English
- Budget: $4-5 million
- Box office: $1,910,000 (North American rentals)

Mr. Billion is a 1977 action comedy/action-adventure film directed by Jonathan Kaplan. It is the Hollywood debut of Terence Hill, and the last film of actor William Redfield, who died before its release.

In the film, a mechanic becomes the sole heir of his recently deceased uncle. But he has to sign a document within a deadline in order to receive his inheritance. His uncle's assistant and a private detective conspire to prevent him from claiming his inheritance.

== Plot ==
Anthony Falcon, a multibillionaire, passes away in a strange accident and gives Guido Falcone, a laid-back Italian mechanic, the entirety of his estate. In order to claim his billion-dollar inheritance, Guido must reach San Francisco within twenty days to sign a document. His uncle's greedy assistant, John Cutler (Jackie Gleason), wants the money for himself, and hires female detective Rosie Jones (Valerie Perrine) to prevent Guido claiming his inheritance.

== Cast ==
- Terence Hill – Guido Falcone
- Valerie Perrine – Rosie Jones
- Jackie Gleason – John Cutler
- Slim Pickens – Duane Hawkins
- William Redfield – Leopold Lacy
- Chill Wills – Colonel Clayton T. Winkle
- Dick Miller – Bernie
- R. G. Armstrong – Sheriff T.C. Bishop
- Neil Summers – Deputy Hank

== Production ==
The film was the idea of Dino de Laurentiis, who wanted to introduce Italian actor Terence Hill, at that time one of the biggest movie stars in Europe, to American audiences. De Laurentiis signed Jonathan Kaplan as director, just coming off the successful White Line Fever.

Kaplan later stated the production was difficult—he wanted to cast Lily Tomlin but Fox insisted on Valerie Perrine. Shooting took place on location in Italy. Although Jackie Gleason had a drinking problem, Kaplan said the highlight of the film was working with the comedian. The director was able to sober Gleason up by performing old routines from The Honeymooners and getting laughs from the crew.

== Reception ==
Mr. Billion was a major financial flop and Kaplan calls it the biggest failure of his career. In a retrospective review, the critic Keith Bailey called it "yet another case of Hollywood bringing a foreign actor in, and getting him to do different material than what made him famous in the first place".
