= Italo Zingarelli =

Italian film producer

- Born: 15 January 1930; Lugo di Romagna, Italy
- Died: 29 April 2000 (aged 70); Rome, Italy
- Occupation: Film producer
- Years active: 1954-1995

Italo Zingarelli (Italian pronunciation: [ˈiːtalo ddziŋɡaˈrɛlli]; 15 January 1930 – 29 April 2000) was an Italian film producer. He produced 26 films between 1954 and 1995. In 1981, he was a member of the jury at the 31st Berlin International Film Festival.

== Selected filmography ==
- The Invincible Gladiator (1961)
- Gladiators 7 (1962)
- The Young Wolves (1968)
- The Five Man Army (1969)
- They Call Me Trinity (1970)
