= Terence Hill =

Italian actor, director and producer (born 1939)

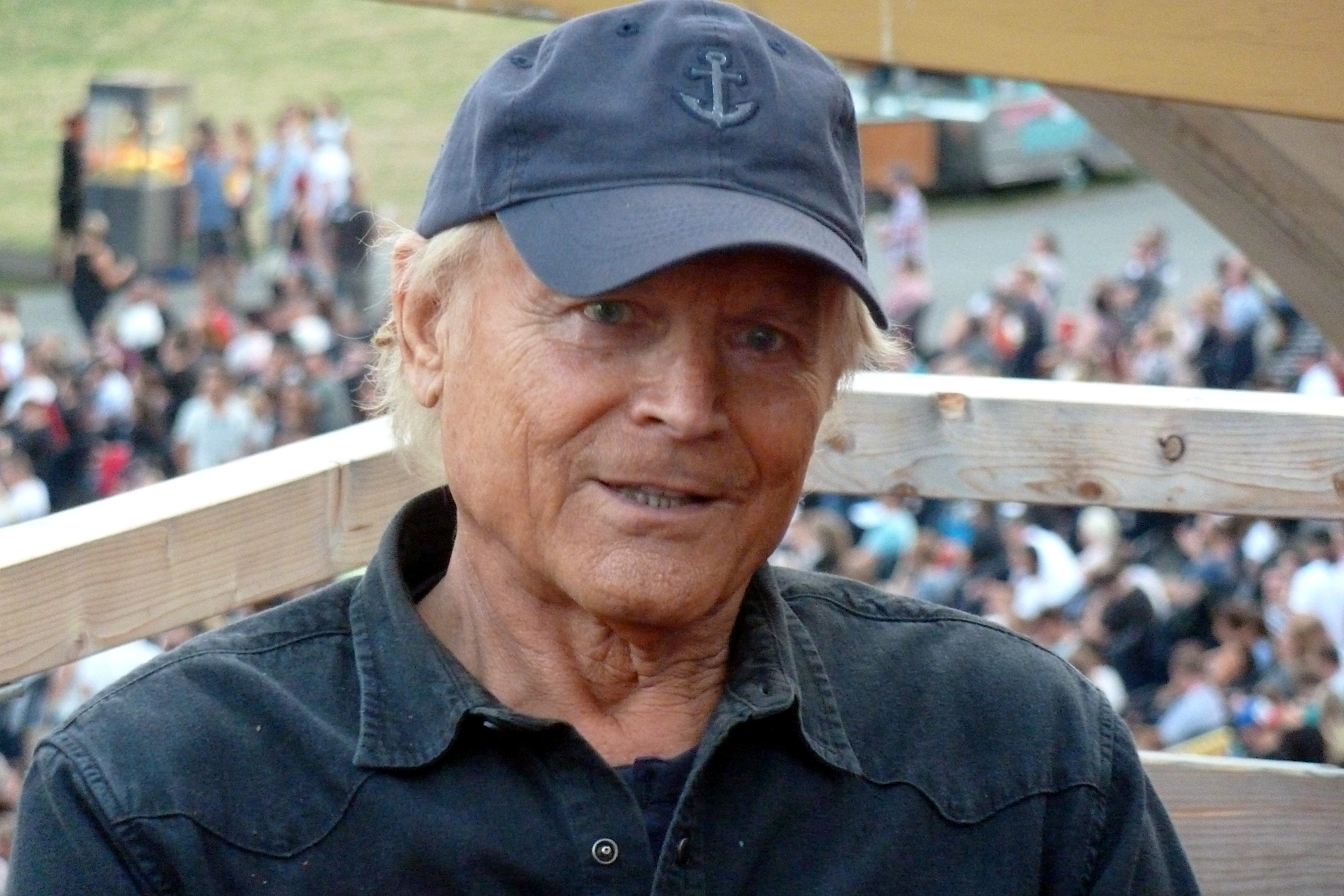
- Hill in 2018
- Born: Mario Girotti; 29 March 1939 (age 87); Venice, Italy
- Citizenship: Italy; United States; Germany
- Occupations: Actor; film director; screenwriter; film producer
- Years active: 1951–present
- Spouse: Lori Zwicklbauer (m. 1967)
- Children: 2
- Website: www.terencehill.com

Terence Hill (born Mario Girotti; 29 March 1939) is an Italian actor, film director, screenwriter, and film producer. He began his career as a child actor and gained international fame for starring roles in action and comedy films, many with his long-time film partner and friend Bud Spencer. During the height of his popularity, Hill was among Italy's highest-paid actors.

His most widely seen films include comic and standard spaghetti Westerns, some based on popular novels by German author Karl May about the Wild West. Of these, the most famous are Lo chiamavano Trinità (They Call Me Trinity, 1970); ...continuavano a chiamarlo Trinità (Trinity Is Still My Name, 1971), the highest-grossing Italian film at that time; and Il mio nome è Nessuno (My Name Is Nobody, 1973), co-starring Henry Fonda. Hill also went on to a successful television career in Italy, most notably playing the title character in the long-running Rai 1 series Don Matteo from 2000 until 2022.

== Early life ==
Hill was born on 29 March 1939 in Venice, Italy. Hill's mother, Hildegard Girotti (née Thieme), was from Dresden, Germany; his father, Girolamo Girotti, was Italian from Amelia, Umbria, and a chemist by occupation. During his childhood, Hill lived in the small town of Lommatzsch, Saxony. As a child, he experienced the bombing of Dresden, which was traumatic for him. He was there until the end of World War II in Europe.

== Career ==
=== Child actor ===
He was discovered at the age of 12 by Italian filmmaker Dino Risi at a swimming meet, and he became a child actor, appearing in Risi's Vacation with a Gangster (1951) as Gianni, the orphan gang leader. "They were looking for a boy gang leader and they found me", he later said.

He had small roles in Voice of Silence (1953) with Jean Marais, Too Young for Love (1953), and It Happened in the Park (1953). He was in Golden Vein (1954) with Märta Torén and Richard Basehart, The Abandoned (1955), and Folgore Division (1955).

=== Leading man ===
Girotti had his first lead in Guaglione (1956). He could also be seen in Mamma sconosciuta (1956), I vagabondi delle stelle (1956), La grande strada azzurra (1956) with Yves Montand and Alida Valli, and Lazzarella (1957).

Girotti did Anna of Brooklyn (1958) with Gina Lollobrigida, The Sword and the Cross (1958) with Yvonne de Carlo (playing Lazarus of Bethany), and a TV version of The Picture of Dorian Gray (1958).

He had supporting parts in Il padrone delle ferriere (1959) with Virna Lisi, Juke box - Urli d'amore (1959), and Hannibal (1959) with Victor Mature and Carlo Pedersoli, who later became known as Bud Spencer. Girotti had the lead roles in Spavaldi e innamorati (1959) and Cerasella (1959), a teen comedy.

He returned to supporting roles with Carthage in Flames (1960), Un militare e mezzo (1960), and The Story of Joseph and His Brethren (1961) with Geoffrey Horne and Robert Morley, directed by Irving Rapper.

Girotti had supporting parts in The Wonders of Aladdin (1961) with Donald O'Connor and directed by Henry Levin and Mario Bava, Pecado de amor (1961), Seven Seas to Calais (1962) with Rod Taylor, and The Shortest Day (1963).

Girotti secured a substantial supporting role in Luchino Visconti's film epic The Leopard (1963) alongside Burt Lancaster and Alain Delon, in which he unsuccessfully tries to court the daughter of Lancaster's character. During this time, he studied classical literature for three years at an Italian university.

=== Germany ===
In 1964, he returned to Germany and there appeared in a series of Heimatfilme, adventure films, and Western films, based on novels by German author Karl May. These included Last of the Renegades (1964) with Lex Barker; three films with Stewart Granger, Amongst Vultures (1964), The Oil Prince (1965) and Old Surehand (1965); Shots in 3/4 Time (1965); Duel at Sundown (1965) with Peter Van Eyck; Call of the Forest (1965), an Austrian movie; Die Nibelungen, Teil 1 - Siegfried (1965); and Die Nibelungen, Teil 2 - Kriemhilds Rache (1967).

In 1967, he returned to Italy to make Io non protesto, io amo (1967), co-starring Caterina Caselli.

=== Partnership with Bud Spencer ===
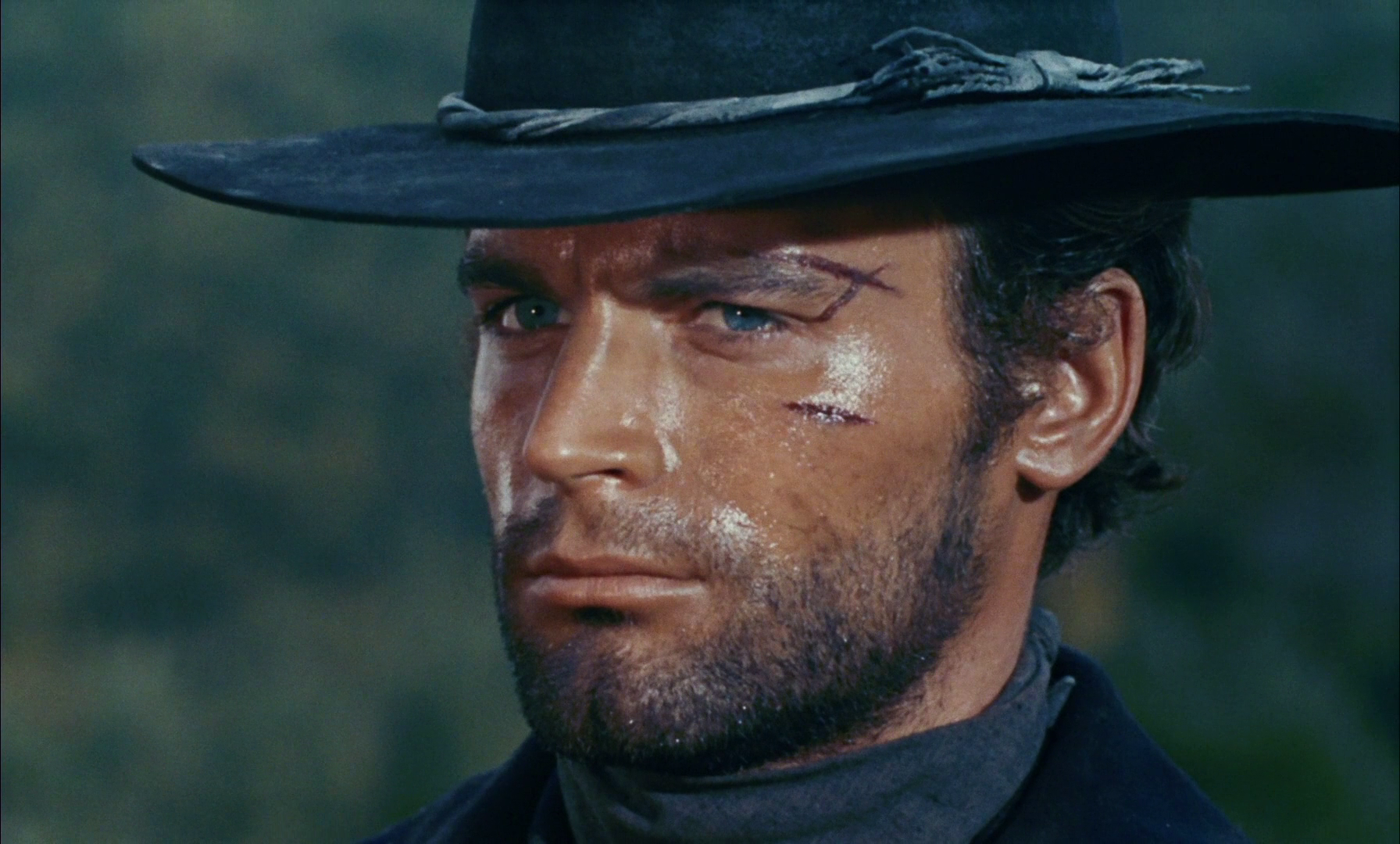
Hill in Django, Prepare a Coffin (1968)

Girotti then appeared alongside Bud Spencer (then known as Carlo Pedersoli) in Giuseppe Colizzi's spaghetti Western God Forgives... I Don't! (1967). (Although Girotti appeared in the same movie as Pedersoli in Hannibal in 1959, they did not meet during filming.) At the time, cast and crew in Westerns frequently adopted American names to give the film a better chance of selling in non-Italian-speaking countries; Girotti changed his name to "Terence Hill". He picked the name from a list of 20 he was given, the story about using his wife's name was a publicity idea. The film was a huge hit – the most popular film of the year in Italy – and established him as a star.

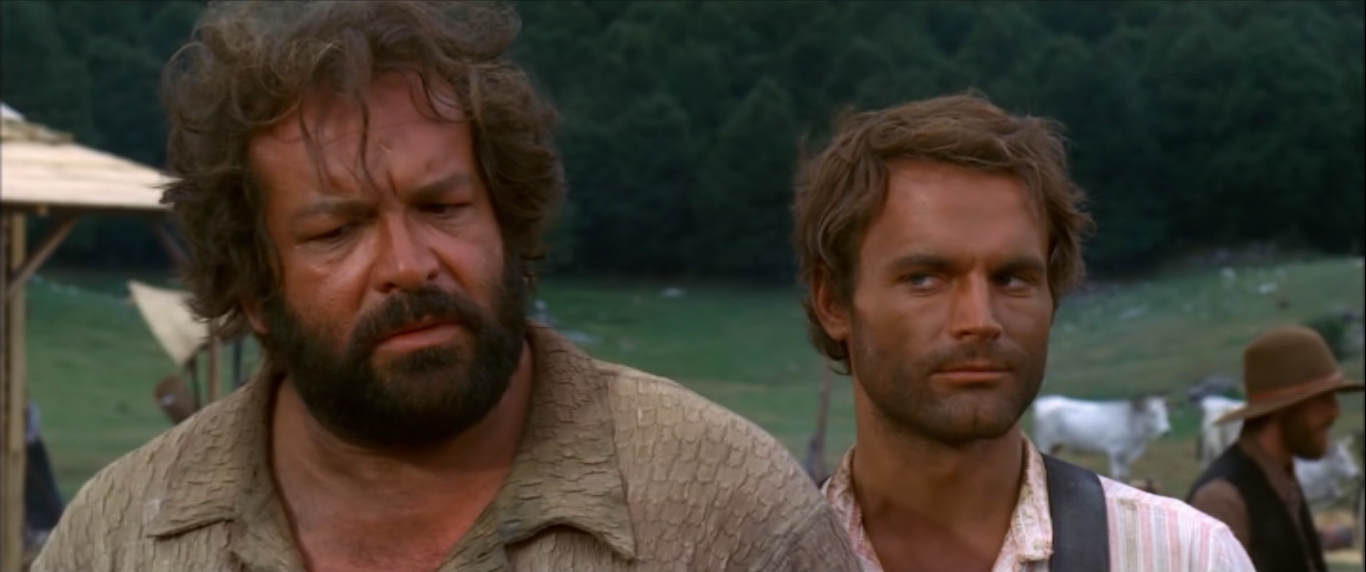
Terence Hill (right) with Bud Spencer in They Call Me Trinity (1970)

Hill followed it with a musicarello, The Crazy Kids of the War (1967) with Rita Pavone, then did a Western, Django, Prepare a Coffin (1968) for director Ferdinando Baldi, a sequel to Django (1966) with Hill playing the role done by Franco Nero in the original; it co-starred Horst Frank and George Eastman (and was featured, much later, at the 64th Venice Film Festival, in 2007).

Hill was a leading man in a musical Western Crazy Westerners (1968), again with Rita Pavone, then was reunited with Spencer in Ace High (1968), a sequel to God Forgives with a cast including several American actors such as Eli Wallach. Hill did The Tough and the Mighty (1968), a biopic of Graziano Mesina, then a second sequel to God Forgives, Boot Hill (1969), co-starring Spencer and Woody Strode.

Hill did The Wind's Fierce (1970), then had a huge hit with Spencer with the comedy Western They Call Me Trinity (1971). Hill did a swashbuckler, Blackie the Pirate (1971), in which Spencer had a small role; they reteamed properly for a Trinity sequel, Trinity Is Still My Name (1972). It was even more popular than the original and had a successful release in the USA.

Hill did a modern-day crime drama The Hassled Hooker (1972) and a comedy Western without Spencer, Man of the East (1972). Spencer and he did ... All the Way, Boys! (1972), their first non-Western, though it was still a comic adventure film.

=== International films ===
Hill has stated in interviews that My Name Is Nobody (1973), in which he co-starred with Henry Fonda, is his personal favorite of all his films. It was based on an idea by Sergio Leone.

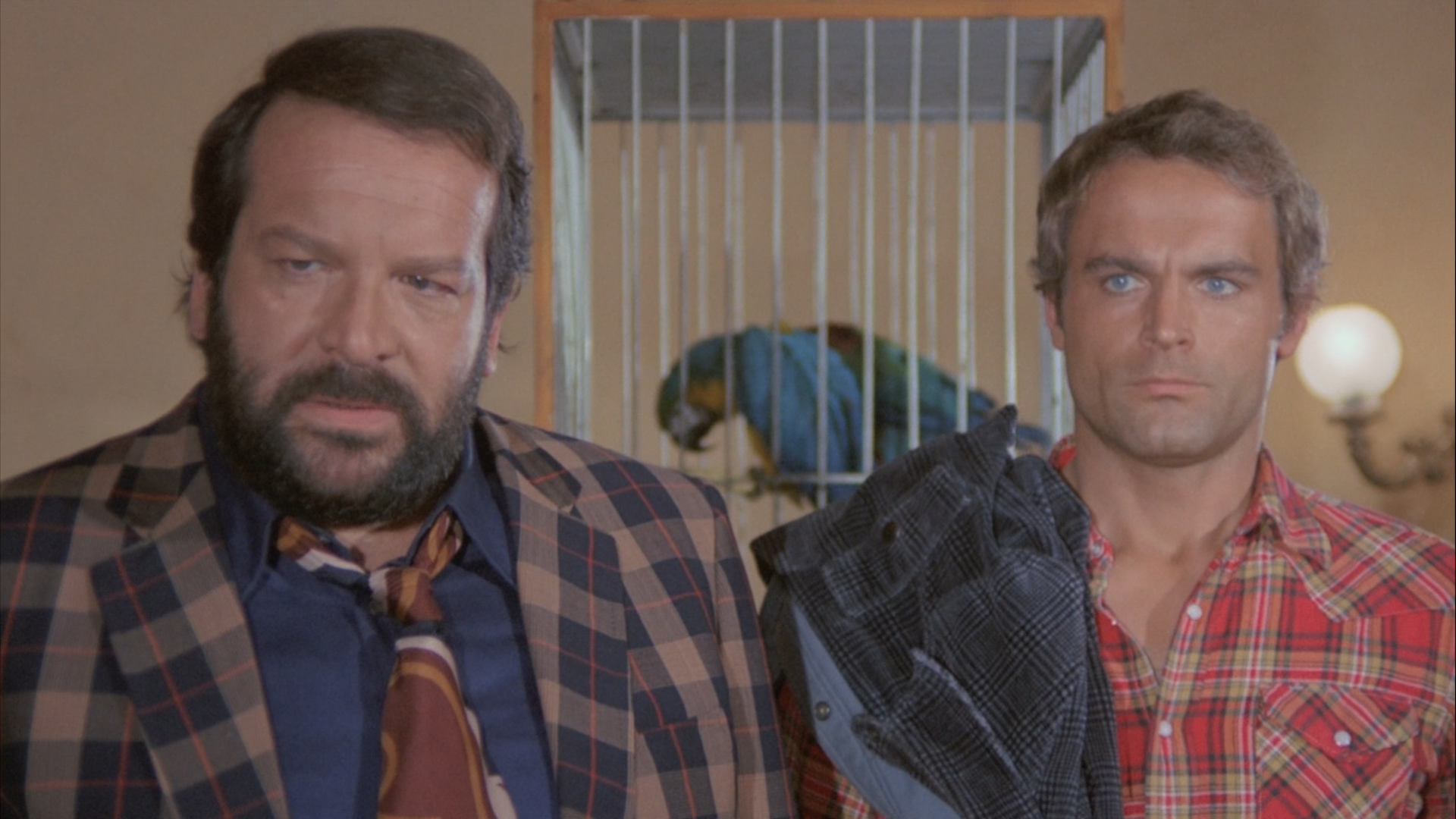
Hill and Bud Spencer in Watch Out, We're Mad! (1974)

Hill again starred with Spencer in Watch Out, We're Mad (1974) and Two Missionaries (1974), then without him in the spaghetti Western A Genius, Two Partners and a Dupe (1975). He moved from Italy to live in the US and settled in Stockbridge, Massachusetts, in the Berkshires.

Dino De Laurentiis cast Hill in his first English-language film, Mr. Billion (1977), directed by Jonathan Kaplan for 20th Century Fox, co-starring Valerie Perrine and Jackie Gleason. It was a box-office flop.

After returning to Italy for Crime Busters (1977) with Spencer, Hill then made another English-language movie, March or Die (1977), an $8 million French Foreign Legion tale for Lew Grade, co-starring Gene Hackman and Catherine Deneuve. It was a box-office disappointment.

Despite his fluency in Italian and English, Hill was usually dubbed by other actors in both languages. In the Italian versions of his films, various actors provided his voice until the late 1960s, when he was primarily dubbed by Sergio Graziani; he was voiced by Pino Locchi from 1970 to 1983, and by Michele Gammino from 1983 to 1996. For English dubs, Lloyd Battista dubbed him in six films, including the Cat Stevens and Hutch Bessy trilogy, while Roger Browne dubbed him in most of his early 1970s films (They Call Me Trinity to A Genius, Two Partners and a Dupe); from Mr. Billion onward, Hill dubbed his own English voice.

Hill and Spencer starred in Odds and Evens (1978), I'm for the Hippopotamus (1979), Who Finds a Friend Finds a Treasure (1981), and Go for It (1983). Without Spencer, Hill made Org (1979), which he also produced, and Super Fuzz (1980).

=== Director ===
Hill did The World of Don Camillo (1984), which he also produced and directed. He teamed with Spencer for Double Trouble (1984), and Miami Supercops (1985), then did They Call Me Renegade (1987), based on a story by Hill.

=== Television ===
Hill turned director for Lucky Luke (1991) in which he starred and that was shot in the United States; it led to a TV series of the same name.

He reunited with Spencer one last time for Troublemakers (1994) which Hill also directed. He did Virtual Weapon (1997) with Marvelous Marvin Hagler.

In 2000, he landed the leading role in the Italian television series Don Matteo (2000–ongoing), about an inspirational parish priest who assists the Carabinieri in solving crimes local to his community. This role earned Hill an international "Outstanding Actor of the Year" award at the 42nd Monte Carlo Television Festival, alongside ones for the series, and for producer Alessandro Jacchia at that festival. Hill left Don Matteo in 2022 after 13 seasons, last appearing in 2024.

During the series' run, he appeared in TV movies L'uomo che sognava con le aquile (2009), Riding the Dark (2009), Doc West (2009), and Triggerman (2009); he co-directed the last two.

In the summer of 2010, Hill filmed another Italian television series for the Italian state television channel Rai Uno, this time entitled Un passo dal cielo (One Step from Heaven), playing a local chief of the state foresters in the region of Alto Adige, with a second season filmed in 2012.

Hill directed the 2018 film My Name Is Thomas, in which he also appeared. The same year, the co-op beat 'em up videogame Bud Spencer & Terence Hill: Slaps and Beans was released.

== Personal life ==
Hill is married to Lori Hill (née Zwicklbauer) and they have two sons. Ross, who was adopted at birth, was killed in a car accident in Stockbridge, Massachusetts, in 1990, while Hill was preparing to film Lucky Luke (1991) on the Bonanza Creek Ranch near Santa Fe, New Mexico.

He holds American citizenship, and in November 2022, he also attained a German citizenship by descent from the German consulate-general in Los Angeles without requiring a naturalization test.

== Filmography ==
=== Film ===
Year	Title	Role	Notes
1951	Vacation with a Gangster	Gianni	
1953	Il viale della speranza	Girolamo Girotti	
1953	Voice of Silence	Boy at the barrier	
1953	Un amore per te		
1953	It Happened in the Park	Un compagno di scuola di Anna Maria	Uncredited
1955	Golden Vein	Corrado	
1955	Abandoned	Wounded Estray	
1955	Folgore Division	Paratrooper Delavigne	
1956	Guaglione	Franco Danieli	
1956	Mamma sconosciuta	Gianni Martini	
1956	I vagabondi delle stelle	Franco	
1957	Lazzarella	Luciano Pico	
1957	The Wide Blue Road	Renato	
1958	Anna of Brooklyn	Ciccillo – Don Luigi's nephew	
1958	The Sword and the Cross	Lazzaro	
1959	First Love		
1959	Il padrone delle ferriere	Octave de Beaulieu	
1959	Juke box urli d'amore	Othello	
1959	Hannibal	Quintilius	
1959	Spavaldi e innamorati	Paolo	
1959	Cerasella	Bruno	
1960	Carthage in Flames	Tsour	
1960	Un militare e mezzo	Giorgio Strazzonelli	
1961	The Story of Joseph and His Brethren	Benjamin	
1961	The Wonders of Aladdin	Prince Moluk	
1961	Pecado de amor	Ángel Vega	
1962	Seven Seas to Calais	Babington	
1962	The Shortest Day	Austrian soldier	
1963	The Leopard	Count Cavriaghi	
1964	Last of the Renegades	Lt. Robert Merril	
1964	Among Vultures	Baker Jr.	
1965	Shots in Threequarter Time	Enrico	
1965	The Oil Prince	Richard Forsythe	
1965	Call of the Forest	Marcello Scalzi	
1965	Duel at Sundown	Larry McGow	
1965	Old Surehand	Toby	
1966	Die Nibelungen, Teil 1: Siegfried	Giselher	
1967	Io non protesto, io amo	Gabriele	
1967	God Forgives... I Don't!	Cat Stevens	
1967	The Crazy Kids of the War	Prof. Giuliano Fineschi	
1968	Django, Prepare a Coffin	Django	
1968	Rita of the West	Black Star	
1968	Ace High	Cat Stevens	
1969	The Tough and the Mighty	Graziano Cassitta	
1969	Boot Hill	Cat Stevens	
1970	The Wind's Fierce	Marco	
1970	They Call Me Trinity	Trinity	
1971	Blackie the Pirate	Blackie	
1971	Trinity Is Still My Name	Trinity	
1972	The Hassled Hooker	Marco Manin	
1972	Man of the East	Sir Thomas Fitzpatrick Phillip Moore	
1972	... All the Way, Boys!	Plata	
1973	My Name Is Nobody	Nessuno	
1974	Watch Out, We're Mad!	Kid	
1974	Two Missionaries	Father / Padre J.	
1975	A Genius, Two Partners and a Dupe	Joe Thanks	
1977	Mr. Billion	Guido Falcone	
1977	Crime Busters	Matt Kirby	
1977	March or Die	Marco Segrain	
1978	Odds and Evens	Johnny Firpo	
1979	Org	Zohommm!!!	Also producer
1979	I'm for the Hippopotamus	Slim	
1980	Super Fuzz	Policeman Dave Speed	
1981	Who Finds a Friend Finds a Treasure	Alan	
1983	Go for It	Rosco Frazer / Steinberg	
1983	The World of Don Camillo	Don Camillo	Also director and producer
1984	Double Trouble	Eliot Vance / Bastiano Coimbra de la Coronilla y Azevedo	
1985	Miami Supercops	Doug Bennet / Officer Jay Donell	
1987	They Call Me Renegade	Luke	Also writer
1991	Lucky Luke	Lucky Luke	Also director
1994	Troublemakers	Travis	Also director
1997	Virtual Weapon	Skims	
2018	My Name Is Thomas	Thomas	Also director and writer

=== Television ===
Year	Title	Role	Notes
1958	Il Novelliere: Il ritratto di Dorian Gray		Television film
1992	Lucky Luke	Lucky Luke	8 episodes
2006	L'uomo che sognava con le aquile	Rocco Ventura	Television film
2009	L'uomo che cavalcava nel buio	Rocco	Television film
2009	Doc West	Doc West	Television film
2009	Triggerman	Doc West	Television film
2000–2022	Don Matteo	Don Matteo	265 episodes
2011–2015	Un passo dal cielo	Pietro	41 episodes

=== Video games ===
Year	Title	Role	Notes
2017	Slaps and Beans	Terence Hill	With Bud Spencer; for PS4, Xbox One, Nintendo Switch and PC
2023	Slaps and Beans 2	Terence Hill	With Bud Spencer; for PS5, PS4, Xbox One, Nintendo Switch and PC

=== Music video ===
Year	Artist	Song	Role	Notes
2019	Fabio Rovazzi	Senza pensieri	Terence Hill	Feat. Loredana Bertè & J-Ax

== Awards ==
On 8 October 2016 Hill received the Tabernas de cine Award at Fort Bravo in Almería.

== See also ==
- Massimo Girotti – Italian actor (1918-2003)
