= Renato Casaro =

Italian illustrator (1935–2025)

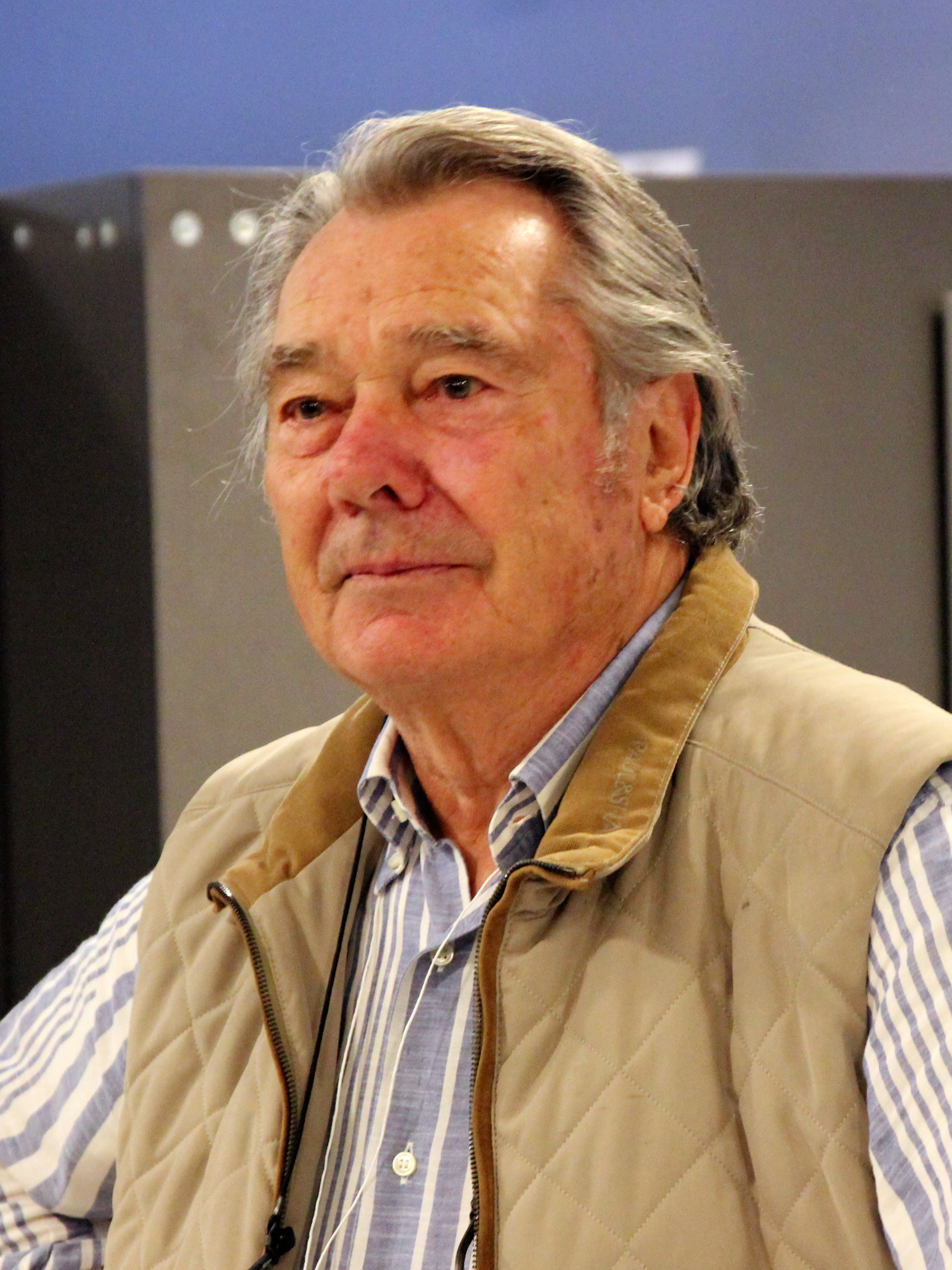
- Casaro in 2016
- Born: 26 October 1935; Treviso, Italy
- Died: 30 September 2025 (aged 89); Treviso, Italy
- Known for: Poster art; illustration
- Awards: Ciak d'oro, 1988; Ciak d'oro, 1991; Jupiter Award, 1992

Renato Casaro (Italian: [reˈnaːto kaˈzaːro]; 26 October 1935 – 30 September 2025) was an Italian artist known for his film posters. He painted over 2,000 posters which included A Fistful of Dollars, Solaris, My Name Is Nobody, Flash Gordon, Conan the Barbarian, Octopussy, Rambo: First Blood Part II (international version), Red Sonja, The Adventures of Baron Munchausen and Dances With Wolves. His work has gone mostly uncredited.

Casaro is considered one of the most important, influential and innovative Italian film poster artists. He made hundreds of works dedicated to the cinema, becoming very popular abroad. He is best known for his fantasy posters.

== Life and career ==
Casaro was born in Treviso on 26 October 1935. Casaro attended a school known for its art program and had a teacher who encouraged him to pursue painting. His early interest in posters reportedly began with movie advertisements. He would go every day to the cinema to see if they were changing the posters, and if they were he would ask if he could take them home where he would try to reproduce them.

In 1953, at age 18, Casaro found a job as a staff artist at Studio Favalli, a famous design and art studio of Rome's film industry. In Rome, at age 21, he opened his own art studio.

Dino De Laurentiis hired Casaro in 1965 to design the poster images for the film The Bible: In the Beginning.... After that, Casaro worked on many films with De Laurentiis, like Flash Gordon, Dune, and Conan the Barbarian. At the same time Casaro continued his business, producing posters for different directors like Sergio Leone, Claude Lelouch, Francis Ford Coppola, Bernardo Bertolucci, Luc Besson, Franco Zeffirelli, and Rainer Werner Fassbinder.

Casaro stopped designing posters in 1998 as film studios began to adopt digital tools. In 2019, Casaro was called by Quentin Tarantino to realize some "old school illustrated Western posters" ("Uccidimi Subito Ringo, disse il Gringo" aka "Kill Me Now Ringo, Said The Gringo", and "Nebraska Jim") for Italian films starring Rick Dalton, the character Leonardo DiCaprio plays in Once Upon a Time in Hollywood.

Casaro died from bronchopneumonia in Treviso on 30 September 2025, at the age of 89. Upon his death, he was acknowledged as a highly influential poster designer, including a tribute from Arnold Schwarzenegger on Twitter.

== Film posters ==
- City Lights (re-release, Italy)
- King Kong (re-release, Italy)
- Romeo and Juliet (1955)
- The Last Command (1955)
- The Magnificent Seven (1961, Italy)
- The Ipcress File (1965)
- For a Few Dollars More (1965, Germany)
- The Bible: In the Beginning... (1966)
- Navajo Joe (1966)
- The Good, the Bad and the Ugly (re-release)
- A Fistful of Dollars (1967, USA)
- They Call Me Trinity (1970)
- Caliber 9 (1972)
- Solaris (1972)
- My Name Is Nobody (1973)
- My Friends (1975)
- Quadrophenia (1979)
- Flash Gordon (1980, Argentina)
- Blow Out (1981)
- Conan the Barbarian (1982)
- Rambo (1982)
- Tenebrae (1982)
- Octopussy (1983, with Daniel Goozee)
- Never Say Never Again (1983)
- The NeverEnding Story (1984, USA)
- Once Upon a Time in America (1984, USA)
- Amadeus (1984, Italy)
- Dune (1984, USA)
- Nothing Left to Do But Cry (1984)
- Rambo: First Blood Part II (1985)
- Flesh and Blood (1985)
- Red Sonja (1985)
- The Name of the Rose (1986)
- The Last Emperor (1987)
- Opera (1987)
- Rambo III (1988)
- The Adventures of Baron Munchausen (1988)
- Total Recall (1990)
- Dances With Wolves (1990, Italy/Germany)
- Misery (1990, Germany)
- The Sheltering Sky (1990)
- Once Upon a Time in Hollywood (2019, fake posters for DiCaprio's character)

== Published collections ==
- Renato Casaro: Africa. ISBN 978-3-7888-1412-0.
- Renato Casaro: Movie Art. ISBN 3-9806443-0-8.
- Renato Casaro: Painted Movies. ISBN 3-9801878-1-0.
- African Memories. ISBN 978-3-87314-477-4.
- Renato Casaro: The Art of Movie Painting. ISBN 978-88-98843-50-3.

== Awards ==
- 1988: Ciak d'oro for best movie poster – Opera
- 1991: Ciak d'oro for best movie poster – The Sheltering Sky
- 1992: Jupiter Award for best movie poster – Dances With Wolves
