= Glauco Onorato =

Italian actor and voice actor (1936–2009)

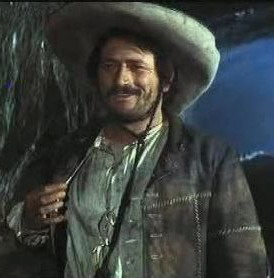
- Onorato in W Django! (1971)
- Born: 7 December 1936; Turin, Italy
- Died: 31 December 2009 (aged 73); Rome, Italy
- Occupations: Actor; voice actor
- Years active: 1959–2009
- Children: 3, including Riccardo Nissem Onorato
- Father: Giovanni Onorato
- Relatives: Marco Onorato (brother); Maria Virginia Onorato (sister)

Glauco Onorato (7 December 1936 – 31 December 2009) was an Italian actor and voice actor.

As an actor and dubber popular with audiences throughout Italy, he was renowned for voicing over nearly all of Bud Spencer's roles as Spencer had a thick Neapolitan accent. Onorato had worked consistently from the late 1950s until shortly before his death.

== Biography ==
Glauco Onorato was born in Turin on 7 December, 1936, and was educated at the Silvio D'Amico National Academy of Dramatic Arts. His father was Giovanni Onorato, also an actor, and his brother was Marco Onorato, who was a cinematographer.

Active in film, theater, and television, Onorato starred in over 31 films and 51 television shows. Among Onorato's most notable roles were as a man haunted by the supernatural in Mario Bava's masterpiece Black Sabbath, a soldier returning from the Russian front in Vittoria De Sica's Sunflower, and as a ruthless gangster in the crime film The Big Racket. He also starred as Leonardo da Vinci's father Piero da Vinci in the television miniseries The Life of Leonardo da Vinci. Onstage, Onorato starred in the 1978 edition of the 1962 musical comedy play Rugantino and made collaborations with many other stage actors and directors such as Enrico Montesano and Ottavia Piccolo. He also starred as Sir John Falstaff in stage adaptation of The Merry Wives of Windsor.

Due to his deep, booming, yet comical voice, Onorato gained fame as a voice actor. He dubbed many foreign-language films and television shows into Italian. He provided the Italian voice for actors such as Danny Glover, James Coburn, Anthony Quinn and Charles Bronson, as well as for Arnold Schwarzenegger in his earlier and iconic films, most notably The Terminator. He is best known for dubbing Italian actor Bud Spencer (whose heavy Neapolitan accent was considered unsuitable for his roles) in nearly all of his movies. In Onorato's animated roles, he provided the Italian voices of Captain Gantu in the Lilo & Stitch franchise, Sykes in Oliver & Company, Professor Ratigan in The Great Mouse Detective, Carface Caruthers in All Dogs Go to Heaven, and Willie the Giant in Mickey's Christmas Carol in the second redubbing.

=== Personal life ===
Onorato had three children: two of his children, Riccardo Nissem and Sara, are also voice actors, while Giovanni is a priest.

== Death ==
Onorato died at the San Camillo Hospital in Rome on 31 December, 2009, at the age of 73, after battling an undisclosed serious illness for some time.

== Filmography ==
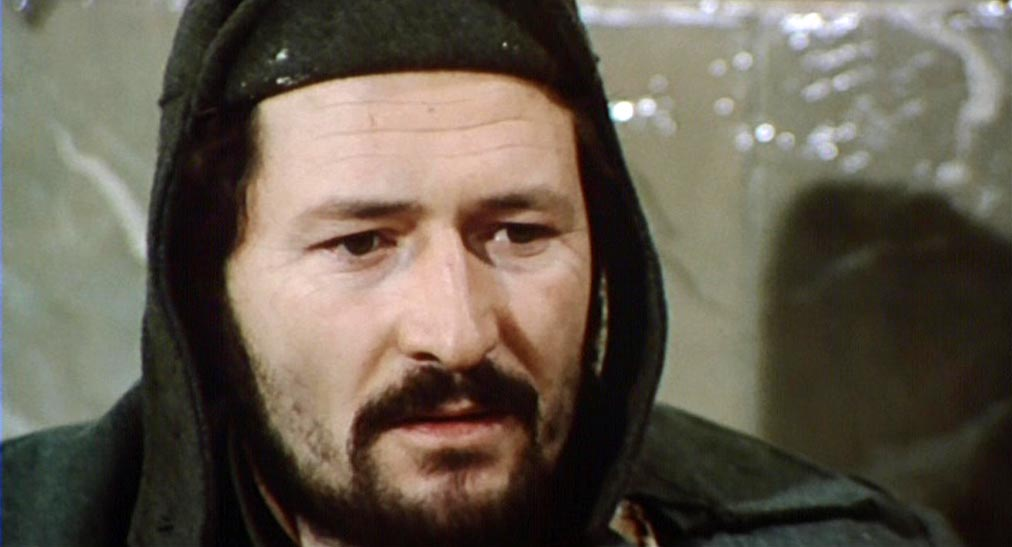
Onorato in Sunflower (1970)

=== Cinema ===
- Spavaldi e Innamorati (1959)
- I Baccanali di Tiberio (1960)
- Lo Sceicco Rosso (1962) - Yussuf
- Black Sabbath (1963) - Giorgio (segment "I Wurdalak")
- Giacobbe, l'Uomo che Lottò con Dio (1963)
- Amori pericolosi (1964) - (segment "La ronda")
- The Revenge of Ivanhoe (1965) - Lockheel
- In a Colt's Shadow (1965) - Title Sequence Narrator (voice)
- Pleasant Nights (1966) - Un soldato
- The Magnificent Texan (1967) - José Pereira
- John the Bastard (1967) - Morenillo
- Boot Hill (1969) - Finch
- Sunflower (1970) - Il reduce
- Long Live Robin Hood (1971) - Friar Tuck (voice, uncredited)
- W Django! (1971) - Carranza
- Incontro (1971) - Claudia and Stefano's Acquaintance
- Black Turin (1972) - Rosario Rao (voice, uncredited)
- Fra' Tazio da Velletri (1973) - Nuccio Tornaquinci
- Li chiamavano i tre moschettieri... invece erano quattro (1973) - Porthos (voice, uncredited)
- The Magnificent Dare Devil (1973) - Grossmann
- The Five Days (1973) - Zampino
- L'Ultimo Uomo di Sara (1974) - Commissario Maras
- Wer stirbt schon gerne unter Palmen (1974) - Paul Cerdan
- Carambola's Philosophy: In the Right Pocket (1975) - Il supremo
- Deep Red (1975) - (uncredited)
- Colpita da improvviso benessere (1975) - Fernando Proietti
- The Big Racket (1976) - Mazzarelli
- Maria R. e Gli Angeli del Trastevere (1976)
- L'altra metà del cielo (1977) - Il ladro pentito
- Poliziotto Sprint (1977) - Pistone
- Stringimi forte Papà (1977)
- Stark System (1980) - Eddy
- Sugar, Honey and Pepper (1980) - Duilio Mencacci
- La Cage aux Folles II (1980) - Luigi
- Tex and the Lord of the Deep (1985) - El Dorado (voice, uncredited)
- Chi Nasce Tondo (2008) - Padre Ignazio (final film role)

=== Television ===
- Il Mondo è una Prigione (1962) (TV Film)
- Delitto e Castigo (1963) (TV Film)
- Bene Mio Core Mio (1964) - L'architetto (TV Film)
- Antony and Cleopatra (1965) - Dolabella (TV Film)
- Vita di Dante (1965) - Il maniscalco
- Trampoli (1966) - Tita
- Caravaggio (1967) - Onorio Longo (TV Film)
- I Promessi Sposi (1967) - Il Griso
- Vita di Cavour (1967) - Giuseppe Garibaldi
- La Roma di Moravia (1967) - Gerardo
- La Freccia Nera (1968–1969) - Ellis Duckworth (6 episodes)
- I Fratelli Karamazov (1969) - Michail Makàrovic Makarov (2 episodes)
- Il Triangolo Rosso (1969) (1 episode)
- Antonio Meucci Cittadino Toscano Contro il Monopolio Bell (1970)
- La Vita di Leonardo da Vinci (1971) - Ser Piero
- Prima, Durante e Dopo la Partita (1972) (TV Film)
- Die merkwürdige Lebensgeschichte des Friedrich Freiherrn von der Trenck (1973) - Franz von der Trenck
- Assunta Spina (1973) (TV Film)
- Door into Darkness (1973) - Police Inspector (1 episode)
- Canossa (1974) - L'abate di Cluny
- L'Assassinio dei Fratelli Rosselli (1974)
- Nucleo Centrale Investigativo (1974) - Maresciallo Di Iorio
- Processo per l'Uccisione di Raffaele Sonzogno Giornalista Romano (1975) - Frezza
- Dopo un Lungo Silenzio (1978) - Giuseppe Marsaghi
- L'Étrange Monsieur Duvallier (1979) - Mozzini (1 episode)
- Bambole: Scene di un Delitto Perfetto (1980)
- Parole e Sangue (1982) - Maggiore Corrias
- I Due Prigionieri (1985) - Signor Varga (TV Film)
- La Grande Cabriole (1989)
- Donne Armate (1990) - Locasciulli (TV Film)
- La piovra, (1992) - Padre Matteo
- Tre Passi nel Delitto: Villa Maltraversi (1993) - Riccardo Maltraversi (TV Film)
- Uno di noi (1996) - Don Marco
- Don Matteo (2000) - Dott. Galimberti (1 episode)
- Centovetrine (2001) - Cesare Bettini
- Le ali Della Vita 2 (2001)
- Saint Anthony: The Miracle Worker of Padua (2002) - Martino (TV Film)
- Luisa Sanfelice (2004) (TV Film)
- I Colori della Vita (2005) (TV Film)
- L'Amore non Basta (2005) - Gennarino (TV Film)
- A Voce Alta (2006) - Raffaele Malato (TV Film)
- La Princesa del Polígono (2007) - Sisquet (TV Film)

== Dubbing roles ==
=== Animation ===
- Gantu in Lilo & Stitch
- Gantu in Stitch! The Movie
- Gantu in Leroy & Stitch
- Professor Rattigan in The Great Mouse Detective
- Sykes in Oliver & Company
- Carface Caruthers in All Dogs Go to Heaven
- Danny in One Hundred and One Dalmatians
- Captain of the Guard in Robin Hood
- Morbo in Futurama (season 1)
- Hernán Cortés in The Road to El Dorado
- George Harrison in Yellow Submarine
- Kazar in The Wild
- Big Indian Chief in Peter Pan (1986 redub)
- Kron in Dinosaur

=== Live action ===
- Terminator in The Terminator
- Liberty Valence in The Man Who Shot Liberty Valence
- Bernardo O’Reilly in The Magnificent Seven
- Roger Murtaugh in Lethal Weapon
- Roger Murtaugh in Lethal Weapon 2
- Roger Murtaugh in Lethal Weapon 3
- Roger Murtaugh in Lethal Weapon 4
- Alan "Dutch" Schaefer in Predator
- Clubber Lang in Rocky III
- Paul Kersey in Death Wish V: The Face of Death
- Louis Sedgwick in The Great Escape
- Tex Panthollow in Charade
- Finis Valorum in Star Wars: Episode I – The Phantom Menace
- John Matrix in Commando
- Mark Kaminski in Raw Deal
- Howard Langston in Jingle All the Way
- Harry Tasker in True Lies
- Jack Cates in 48 Hrs.
- Cecil Fredericks in Night at the Museum
- James Jordan in Space Jam
- Simon in Grand Canyon
- Hershey in 3 A.M.
- Ogion in Earthsea
- Marty Madison in Dreamgirls
- Isaac Johnson in Shooter
- Steve Boland in When Hell Broke Loose
- Grigori Borzov in Telefon
- Franz Propp in Farewell, Friend
- Jack Murphy in Murphy’s Law
- Jay Killian in Assassination
- Rolf Steiner in Cross of Iron
- Whit in Ride Lonesome
- Nick Casey in The Baltimore Bullet
- Jerry Fanon in Firepower
- Tobias Alcott in The Man from Elysian Fields
- Mr. Crisp in Sister Act 2: Back in the Habit
- Glen Whitehouse in Affliction
- Bill Sikes in Oliver!
- Athos in The Three Musketeers
- Dave Averconnelly in Venom
- Antonius Proximo in Gladiator
- Hutch Bessy in God Forgives... I Don't!
- Hutch Bessy in Ace High
- Hutch Bessy in Boot Hill
- Jelinek in The Fifth Day of Peace
- Mesito in The Five Man Army
- Bambino in They Call Me Trinity
- Bambino in Trinity Is Still My Name
- Salud in ... All the Way, Boys!
- Hiram Coburn in It Can Be Done Amigo
- Rosario Rao in Black Turin
- Eli Sampson in A Reason to Live, a Reason to Die
- Charlie Smith in Even Angels Eat Beans
- Inspector "Flatfoot" Rizzo in Flatfoot
- Ben in Watch Out, We're Mad!
- Father Pedro de Leon in Two Missionaries
- Wilbur Walsh in Crime Busters
- Bulldozer in They Called Him Bulldozer
- Charlie Firpo in Odds and Evens
- Tom in I'm for the Hippopotamus
- Scott Hall in The Sheriff and the Satellite Kid
- Scott Hall in Everything Happens to Me
- Charlie O'Brien in Who Finds a Friend Finds a Treasure
- Banana Joe in Banana Joe
- Bud Graziano in Bomber
- Alan Parker in Cat and Dog
- Doug O'Riordan in Go for It
- Greg Wonder in Double Trouble
- Steve Forest in Miami Supercops
- The Genie in Aladdin
- Bull Webster in Speaking of the Devil
