= Carlo Reali =

Italian actor, voice actor, and film editor (born 1930)

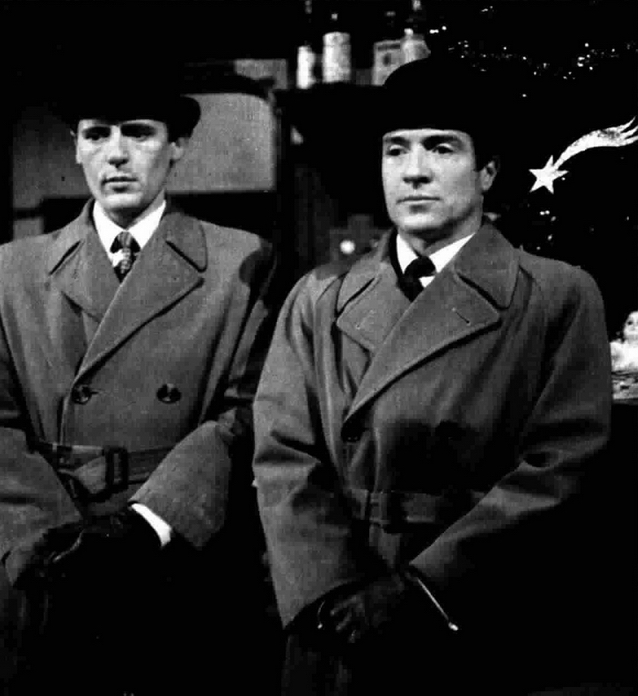
- Reali (right) with Mario Piave in Una pistola nel cassetto (1970)
- Born: 6 December 1930 (age 95); Padua, Italy
- Occupations: Actor; voice actor
- Years active: 1959–present

Carlo Reali (born 6 December 1930) is an Italian actor, voice actor, and film editor.

== Biography ==
Born in Padua, Reali was a frequent visitor of the many theatres across Rome before his career began. He eventually found his place working onstage as an actor and director and acting in the cinema, starring in films that would later become international successes such as La Cage aux Folles, also sharing the screen with Bud Spencer in several of his films.

Prior to his acting career, Reali worked as an editor from 1969 to 1979. He notably edited four films directed by Italian horror maestro Mario Bava: A Bay of Blood, Baron Blood, Lisa and the Devil, and Rabid Dogs.

As a voice actor, he has dubbed over many actors in Italian, including Steve Martin, Eli Wallach, Bob Hoskins, Danny DeVito, Michael Keaton, Don Ameche and Tim Curry. He has gained recognition for voicing Palpatine (portrayed by Ian McDiarmid) in the Italian version of the Star Wars franchise since 1999 as well as Bob Kelso (portrayed by Ken Jenkins) in the Italian version of Scrubs. Reali has also done dubbing work for Disney. For example, he has voiced Horace Horsecollar in the Italian version of The Prince and the Pauper as well as Captain Hook in his follow-up appearances.

In English, Reali has dubbed Cecconi the Seller and the Innkeeper of the Red Prawn, portrayed physically by actors Sergio Forconi and Marcello Marziali respectively, in Matteo Garrone's 2019 film Pinocchio.

== Filmography ==
=== Actor ===
==== Film ====
- Escape by Night (1960)
- Michelino Cucchiarella (1964)
- The Visit (1964)
- L'amore breve (1969)
- Blackie the Pirate (1971)
- Il mostro (1977)
- La Cage aux Folles (1978)
- Flatfoot in Africa (1978)
- Odds and Evens (1978)
- They Called Him Bulldozer (1978)
- The Sheriff and the Satellite Kid (1979)
- Everything Happens to Me (1980)
- Buddy Goes West (1981)
- Banana Joe (1981)
- How the Toys Saved Christmas (1996) - voice
- Bedrooms (1997)
- Monella (1998)
- Excellent Cadavers (1999)
- Kate - The Taming of the Shrew (2004) - voice
- Christmas Rematch (2004) - voice
- Detective per caso (2019)

==== Television ====
- La pelle degli altri - TV play (1959)
- La trincea - TV miniseries (1961)
- Il mondo è una prigione - TV film (1962)
- La cocuzza - TV film (1963)
- Una coccarda per il re - TV miniseries (1970)
- L'esperimento - TV film (1971)
- Delitto di regime - Il caso Don Minzoni - TV miniseries (1973)
- Noi siamo angeli - TV series (1997)
- Benedetti dal Signore - TV series (2004)

=== Editor ===
==== Film ====
Year	Title	Director	Notes
1969	The Ravine	Paolo Cavara	
1969	The Laughing Woman	Piero Schivazappa	
1970	Ostia	Sergio Citti	
1970	Whirlpool	José Ramón Larraz	
1970	The Snake God	Piero Vivarelli	
1971	Bastard, Go and Kill	Gino Mangini	
1971	Terrible Day of the Big Gundown	Sergio Garrone	
1971	The Double	Romolo Guerrieri	
1971	A Bay of Blood	Mario Bava	
1971	Trastevere	Fausto Tozzi	
1971	Deviation	José Ramón Larraz	
1971	We Are All in Temporary Liberty	Manlio Scarpelli	
1972	Zambo, King of the Jungle	Bitto Albertini	
1972	Decameron proibitissimo (Boccaccio mio statte zitto)	Marino Girolami	
1972	Where the Bullets Fly	Sergio Grieco	
1972	Baron Blood	Mario Bava	
1972	The Black Decameron	Piero Vivarelli	
1973	Gott schützt die Liebenden	Alfred Vohrer	
1974	Abbasso tutti, viva noi	Gino Mangini	
1974	Lisa and the Devil	Mario Bava	
1974	Una donna per sette bastardi	Roberto Bianchi Montero	
1974	La cameriera	Roberto Bianchi Montero	
1974	La badessa di Castro	Armando Crispino	
1974	Hold-Up	Germán Lorente	
1975	My Mother's Friend	Mauro Ivaldi	
1976	La portiera nuda	Luigi Cozzi	
1976	Emmanuelle's Silver Tongue	Mauro Ivaldi	
1976	A Sold Life	Aldo Florio	
1976	La cameriera nera	Mario Bianchi	
1977	Cosmos: War of the Planets	Alfonso Brescia	
1977	Grazie tante - Arrivederci	Mauro Ivaldi	
1977	Seagulls Fly Low	Giorgio Cristallini	
1978	Battaglie negli spazi stellari	Alfonso Brescia	
1979	Rand rover	Arduino Sacco	
1979	Nella misura in cui...	Piero Vivarelli	
1979	Il matto	Franco Giornelli	
1998	Rabid Dogs	Mario Bava	Filmed in 1974

==== Television ====
Year	Title	Notes
1979	Mathias Sandorf	6 episodes

=== Dubbing roles ===
==== Animation ====
- Captain Hook in Return to Never Land, Disney's House of Mouse, Mickey's Magical Christmas: Snowed in at the House of Mouse, Mickey's House of Villains, Jake and the Never Land Pirates
- Palpatine / Darth Sidious in Star Wars: Clone Wars (2003 TV series), Star Wars: The Clone Wars (film), Star Wars: The Clone Wars (2008 TV series), Star Wars Rebels
- Launchpad McQuack and Charles Upstart III in DuckTales, Launchpad McQuack in DuckTales the Movie: Treasure of the Lost Lamp
- Hyman Krustowsky (season 29+), Dr. Nussbaum, Headmaster Greystash and Don Castellaneta in The Simpsons
- Horton Letract, Sir Harold, E-Z Smith and Doctor William Wu in Quack Pack
- Judge (season 11+) and Ezekiel in Family Guy
- Bilbo Baggins in The Lord of the Rings
- Grandpa Smurf (1st voice) in The Smurfs
- Creeper in The Black Cauldron
- Winston in Oliver & Company
- Horace Horsecollar in The Prince and the Pauper
- Jiminy Cricket in Mickey's Christmas Carol (1990 redub)
- Grandpa Bud in Meet the Robinsons
- King Stefan in Disney Princess Enchanted Tales: Follow Your Dreams
- Spoons in Rango
- Secretary of the Interior in Planes: Fire & Rescue
- Papá Julio in Coco
- Junior "Midnight" Moon in Cars 3
- Unwin in Disney's Adventures of the Gummi Bears
- Stan Lee in Teen Titans Go! To the Movies

==== Live action ====
- Cecconi the Seller and Innkeeper of the Red Prawn in Pinocchio (2019, English dub)
- Palpatine in Star Wars: Episode I – The Phantom Menace, Star Wars: Episode II – Attack of the Clones, Star Wars: Episode V – The Empire Strikes Back (2004 edition)
- Mortimer Duke in Trading Places, Coming to America
- Bishop and Father Mabeuf in Les Misérables (2012 film)
- Bob Kelso in Scrubs
- Junior Soprano in The Sopranos
- Mr. Chairman in Looney Tunes: Back in Action
- Mr. Dawes Jr. in Mary Poppins Returns
- Grandmaster servant in Thor: Ragnarok
- Casino patron in Black Panther
- School bus driver in Avengers: Infinity War
- Pedestrian in Ant-Man and the Wasp
- Stan Lee in Captain Marvel, Deadpool 2
- Mayor Augustus Maywho in How the Grinch Stole Christmas
- Gus in Night at the Museum: Secret of the Tomb
- Donald Fallon in The Associate
- Arthur Abbott in The Holiday
- Jack Kelly in Road to Perdition
- Barty Crouch Sr. in Harry Potter and the Goblet of Fire
- Chattar Lal in Indiana Jones and the Temple of Doom
- General Ross in Indiana Jones and the Kingdom of the Crystal Skull
- Doc Cantrow in The Heartbreak Kid
- Betelgeuse in Beetlejuice
- Worryworth in The Hobbit: The Battle of the Five Armies
- William Stryker Sr. in X-Men: First Class
- Albert Garner in Going in Style
- Merlin in King Arthur
- Janos Slynt in Game of Thrones
- Ethan Kanin in 24
- Cousin Itt in The Addams Family
- Sardo Numspa in The Golden Child
- Candy in Of Mice and Men
- Lyle Ferguson in Ghost
- Winston Churchill in Inglourious Basterds
- Prime Minister in Ali G Indahouse

==== Video games ====
- Captain Hook in Disneyland Adventures, Peter Pan: Adventures in Neverland, Peter Pan: The Legend of Neverland
- Palpatine / Darth Sidious in Disney Infinity 3.0
