= Osvaldo Desideri =

Italian art director (1939–2023)

- Born: 16 February 1939; Rome, Italy
- Died: 18 October 2023 (aged 84)
- Occupations: Art director, production designer, set decorator
- Years active: 1969–2010

Osvaldo Desideri (16 February 1939 – 18 October 2023) was an Italian art director, production designer, and set decorator. He won an Academy Award in the category Best Art Direction for the film The Last Emperor.

== Life and career ==
Born in Rome, Desideri graduated as an industrial technician. He started his career as an assistant production designer, becoming a close collaborator of Ferdinando Scarfiotti in the 1970s. He worked in over 120 films, including works by Federico Fellini, Sergio Leone, Luchino Visconti, Billy Wilder, Michelangelo Antonioni, Pier Paolo Pasolini, Roberto Rossellini, Franco Zeffirelli, Giuseppe Tornatore, Roberto Benigni and Liliana Cavani. For his work in Bernardo Bertolucci's The Last Emperor he was awarded an Academy Award, a David di Donatello and a Ciak D'Oro.

== Death ==
Desideri died on 18 October 2023, at the age of 84.

== Selected filmography ==
- The Conformist (1970)
- Death in Venice (1971)
- Avanti! (1972)
- Till Marriage Do Us Part (1974)
- The Night Porter (1974)
- The Passenger (1975)
- Salò, or the 120 Days of Sodom (1975)
- Fantozzi (1975)
- The Messiah (1975)
- Todo modo (1976)
- Strange Occasion (1976)
- Beyond Good and Evil (1977)
- They Called Him Bulldozer (1978)
- City of Women (1980)
- Flatfoot in Egypt (1980)
- Buddy Goes West (1981)
- Bomber (1982)
- Once Upon a Time in America (1984)
- Nothing Left to Do But Cry (1984)
- Secrets Secrets (1985)
- The Professor (1986)
- The Last Emperor (1987)
- Fair Game (1988)
- Young Toscanini (1988)
- Towards Evening (1990)
- The Sun Also Shines at Night (1990)
- Fantozzi 2000 – La clonazione (1999)
- The Good War (2002)
- Forever (2003)
