= Riccardo Pizzuti =

Italian actor and stuntman

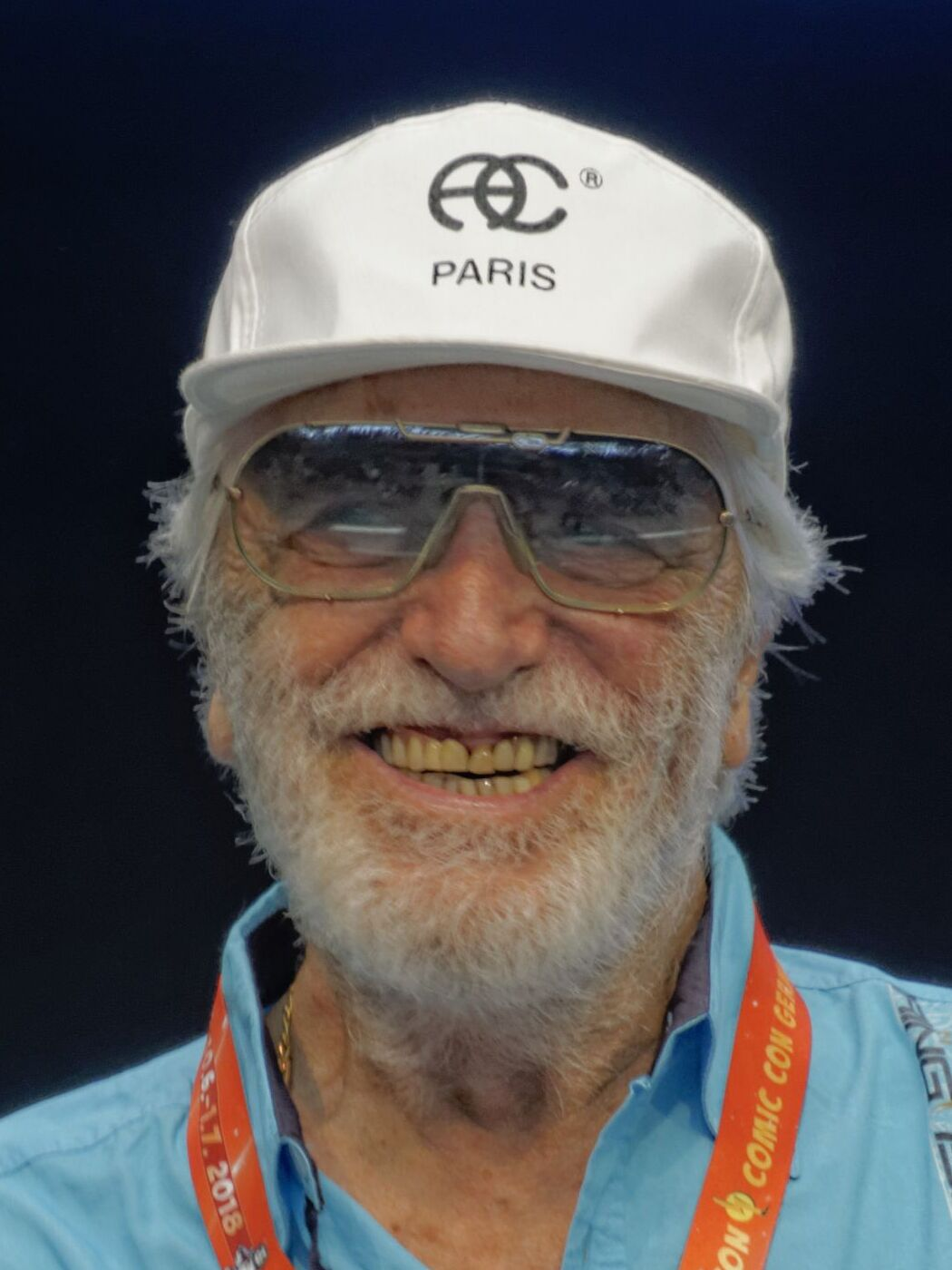
- Pizzuti in 2018
- Born: 28 May 1934 (age 91); Cetraro, Calabria, Italy
- Occupations: Actor, stuntman

Riccardo Pizzuti (born 28 May 1934) is an Italian actor and stuntman. He is known for playing gunfighter Morton Clayton in the 1972 film Man of the East. He appeared in They Call Me Trinity, and its sequel Trinity Is Still My Name. He often appeared in films featuring the actors Terence Hill and Bud Spencer, usually cast as a villain. He has also been credited as Rick Piper and Peter Whiteman.

== Partial filmography ==
- The Vengeance of Ursus (1961) – Fighter (uncredited)
- Agenti Segreti Contro: I tre nemici (1962) – Train Thug (uncredited)
- The Secret Mark of D'Artagnan (1962) – Officer (uncredited)
- A Queen for Caesar (1962) – Soldier (uncredited)
- D'Artagnan contro i 3 moschettieri (1963) – Tavern Fight Soldier (uncredited)
- The Black Duke (1963) – Soldier (uncredited)
- Spartacus and the Ten Gladiators (1964) – Roman Senator and Commander (uncredited)
- Revenge of The Gladiators (1964) – Gladiator (uncredited)
- Fire Over Rome (1965)
- Blood for a Silver Dollar (1965) – Soldier (uncredited)
- L'avventuriero della Tortuga (1965) – Pirate
- Degueyo (1966) – Tom (uncredited)
- Arizona Colt (1966) – Watch Henchman
- Fort Yuma Gold (1966) – Corporal Wilson
- Sugar Colt (1966) – Man in Saloon (uncredited)
- Django Shoots First (1966) – Cluster Henchman (uncredited)
- Blood at Sundown (1966) – Fighter in Bar (uncredited)
- Long Days of Vengeance (1967) – Bystander/Cobb Henchman (uncredited)
- Up the MacGregors! (1967) – Bandit
- Wanted (1967) – Mathias
- The Magnificent Texan (1967) – Jimmy Stark
- Any Gun Can Play (1967) – Paco
- Gunman Sent by God (1968) – Coleman Henchman (uncredited)
- Vengeance (1968) – Mendoza's Henchman (uncredited)
- Garter Colt (1968)
- May God Forgive You... But I Won't (1968) – Bearded Bounty Hunter (uncredited)
- Ace High (1968) – Harold Henchman
- Zorro the Fox (1968) – Don Julio
- The Nephews of Zorro (1968) – Lanciere
- The Battle of El Alamein (1969) – Jailbird (uncredited)
- God Will Forgive My Pistol (1969) – Pedro Ramirez (uncredited)
- The Specialists (1969) – Brawler (uncredited)
- The Price of Power (1969) – Deputy (uncredited)
- Quintana: Dead or Alive (1969) – Soldier (uncredited)
- Fighters from Ave Maria (1970) – Parker's Henchman (uncredited)
- Apocalypse Joe (1970) – Berg Henchman
- They Call Me Trinity (1970) – Jeff
- Day of Judgment (1971) – Man Killed at Waterfalls
- W Django! (1971) – Thompson
- Trinity Is Still My Name (1971) – Chief of the Dallas Gunmen
- Lady Frankenstein (1971) – The Creature
- It Can Be Done Amigo (1972) – Franciscus Gang Member (uncredited)
- Man of the East (1972) – Morton Clayton
- ... All the Way, Boys! (1972) – Naso
- Even Angels Eat Beans (1973) – The Cobra
- Battle of the Amazons (1973) – Medonte
- The Magnificent Dare Devil (1973) – Brauner's Driver (uncredited)
- Super Stooges vs. the Wonder Women (1974) – Philones
- Charleston (1974) – Maloney's Henchman
- Two Missionaries (1974) – Menendez's Henchman #1 (uncredited)
- White Fang to the Rescue (1974) – Dog Trainer
- Flatfoot in Hong Kong (1975) – Accardo's Thug (uncredited)
- Soldier of Fortune (1976) – Villeforte (uncredited)
- Keoma (1976) – Caldwell Gang Member #1
- Crime Busters (1977) – Fred's Henchman
- They Called Him Bulldozer (1978) – Soldier #1 (uncredited)
- Odds and Evens (1978) – Mancino
- The Sheriff and the Satellite Kid (1979) – Airman
- Flatfoot in Egypt (1980) – Salvatore Coppola
- Everything Happens to Me (1980) – First Woodcutter
- Buddy Goes West (1981) – Colorado Sim
- Who Finds a Friend Finds a Treasure (1981) – Hood (uncredited)
- Odd Squad (1981) – Soldier Dario Tognon
- Count Tacchia (1982) – Tomegaux
- Go for It (1983) – Mr. Spider
- Rush (1983) – Steel
- Speaking of the Devil (1991) – Joe the Taxi Driver
- Sons of Trinity (1995) – Gunslinger
