= Cary Guffey =

American former child actor

- Born: Douglasville, Georgia, U.S.
- Occupations: Child actor, financial planner
- Years active: 1977–1985
- Spouse: Michelle Quillen
- Children: 2
- Parent(s): Larry and Sue Guffey

Cary Guffey is an American former child actor and financial planner. He is best known for his debut in the role of Barry Guiler in the film Close Encounters of the Third Kind (1977).

== Biography ==
Born in Douglasville, Georgia, Guffey was raised in West Windsor, New Jersey and attended West Windsor-Plainsboro High School South before graduating from the University of Florida with a degree in marketing and from Jacksonville State University with an M.B.A.

Guffey made his film debut in the 1977 film Close Encounters of the Third Kind. In 1979, he appeared in the movie The Sheriff and the Satellite Kid and its sequel Everything Happens to Me, with Bud Spencer. Guffey made his last onscreen appearance in the 1985 miniseries North and South.

As an adult, Guffey embarked on a career in financial services, first with Merrill Lynch, then, beginning in 2012, with PNC Investments.

== Filmography ==
Film
Year	Film	Role	Notes
1977	Close Encounters of the Third Kind	Barry Guiler	
1979	The Sheriff and the Satellite Kid	H7-25 – extraterrestrial child	Alternative title: E.T. and the Sheriff
1980	Everything Happens to Me	H7-25 (aka Charlie Warren)	Alternative title: Why Did You Pick on Me?
1983	Cross Creek	Floyd Turner	
1983	Stroker Ace	Little Doc	Alternative title: Stand on It
1984	Mutant	Billy	Alternative title: Night Shadows
1984	The Bear	Grandson Marc	
Television
Year	Title	Role	Notes
1983	Chiefs	Billy Lee	Miniseries
1985	Poison Ivy	Timmy Mezzy	Television movie
1985	North and South	Young Billy Hazard	Miniseries, (final television appearance)

== Bibliography ==
- Holmstrom, John. The Moving Picture Boy: An International Encyclopaedia from 1895 to 1995, Norwich, Michael Russell, 1996, p. 390.
