= Buffy Dee =

American actor

- Born: Anthony DeSantolo; September 15, 1923; Middletown, New York, USA
- Died: November 1995 (72 aged); Middletown, New York, USA
- Occupations: Actor and musician

Anthony DeSantolo (September 15, 1923 – November 1995), known professionally as Buffy Dee, was an Italian-American actor and musician. Buffy Dee suffered from polio as a child and spent a short portion of his life in wheelchair. Although he recovered, he was left with a slight limp.

He went to school for law and finished his degree at the University of Miami. He lived most of his life in Miami, Florida. He married Eleanor Korn. He did not have any children.

Buffy Dee was a club owner in Miami and a drummer for Carmen Cavallaro, while also taking acting roles in a number of film and television productions, usually filmed in Miami. He is probably best remembered (at least by European audiences) as the supervillain "K-1" in the Italian action comedy film Go for It (1983).

== Filmography ==
Title	Year	Character
Extralarge: Diamonds (TV Movie)	1993	Receiver
Nightmare Beach	1989	Kimberly's Third Client
Miss Caribe	1988	Rainbow
A Taxi Driver in New York	1987	Don Vincenzo
Aladdin	1986	Leader of the child trafficking gang
Miami Supercops	1985	Pancho
Miami Vice	1984	Mickey, season 1 episode: "One Eyed Jack"
Go For It	1983	K-1
Super Fuzz	1980	Ticket seller with turban on fair
Hardly Working	1980	C.B.
Mako: The Jaws of Death	1976	Barney
Murph The Smurf	1975	Bucks
Caribe	1975	Tuskey, episode: "The Plastic Connection"
Peeper	1975	Bazooka Himself
Kojak (TV Series)	1974	Catonsky, season 2 episode: "The Best War in Town"
Lady Ice	1973	Tony Lacava
All Fall Down	1962	Police Lieutenant
