= Troublemakers (1994 film) =

Troublemakers (Botte di Natale)
- Italian DVD cover - Art by Renato Casaro
- Directed by: Terence Hill
- Written by: Jess Hill
- Starring: Terence Hill; Bud Spencer
- Cinematography: Carlo Tafani
- Music by: Pino Donaggio
- Release date: 25 November 1994
- Running time: 101 minutes
- Countries: Italy; United States; Germany
- Languages: English; Italian

Troublemakers (Italian: Botte di Natale, also known as The Fight Before Christmas) is a 1994 spaghetti Western comedy film. It is the last pairing of Terence Hill (who also directed) and Bud Spencer.

== Plot ==
Travis, a gunslinger receives a letter from his mother Maw, asking him to bring his brother Moses and his family to a Christmas reunion and to give them an unknown treasure she claims to have inherited from his father. Moses is a bounty hunter, who is angry at Maw, for letting his stolen horses loose, forcing Travis to set up a plan. Travis saves an outlaw named Sam Stone from being hanged and teams up with his brother to catch him. When the brothers stay at Moses' family's house, Travis gives them plans to get to Maw's. When they head off the next morning, Moses' family heads on their way to Maw's.

While passing some time at a town, Travis gets into a fist fight with a man, named Dodge and his gang, who were teasing a young woman. Moses unwillingly comes and helps Travis finish them off. The woman, Bridget invites the brothers to have cookies and tea with her and her sister, Melie. After leaving and setting up camp, Travis finds Stone and gang, talking about robbing a bank, the next day at noon. The next day, the brothers plan a trap to catch Stone. The plan backfires when they come in at the wrong time. The sheriff and his deputy mistake Travis and Moses as part of Stone's gang and arrest them.

Bridget bails Travis out, revealing that Stone took their beloved bear. When Moses is sentenced to hang the next morning, Travis tries to free him in the same way he freed Stone (shooting the noose.) A dog attacks Travis and Moses is hanged, but due to his enormous size, he destroys the gallows. Moses survives with only a few splinters. He comes up with a plan to catch Stone, but the plan fails and they are captured. Travis reveals to Stone that he saved his life, and Stone lets them go. Moses comes up with plan B, which works. When Moses falls asleep, Travis frees Stone and Stone dummy-ties him.

Moses abandons Travis, but he hitches a ride from nearby Navajo Indians. Moses' son, Junior wants to buy a horse for his father. He heads to town and is captured by Stone, who learns of the Christmas reunion. Travis and Moses reunite and wait for Stone's next move. Junior escapes and follows the brothers. He camps out for the night. Junior wakes up and finds himself face-to-face with a western diamondback rattlesnake. He attempts to flee but gets bitten on the leg. He manages to ride to Travis and Moses' camp. The brothers take him to Bridget's and Melie's. Bridget injects Junior with a serum that neutralizes the venom.

Travis reveals the reunion, angering Moses. Moses is about to fight with Travis, but Junior warns them about Stone's plan. Before leaving, Bridget and Travis share a kiss. The brothers finally arrive at Maw's and discover that she is holding Stone captive. Moses' family, Travis, Bridget and Melie all share a Christmas dinner as a family. However, the sheriff, deputy, Dodge and his gang plan to kill them but drop their guns when they are hypnotized by the night sky's beauty. A giant fist fight occurs between the two groups, involving the family winning. One of the daughters calls the event "The Fight Before Christmas."

The next morning, Maw reveals that the treasure is where their hearts are, much to Stone's dismay. Maw then leaves for Denver and all the people have their picture taken by the photographer.

== Cast ==
- Terence Hill as Travis
- Bud Spencer as Moses
- Boots Southerland as Sam Stone
- Ruth Buzzi as Grandma Maw
- Jonathan Tucker as Moses Junior
- Neil Summers as Dodge
- Anne Kasprik as Bridget
- Eva Hassmann as Melie
- Ron Carey as Sheriff Fox
- Fritz Sperberg as Deputy Sheriff Joey
- Radha Delamarter as Janie
- John David Garfield as Photographer
- Paul Ukena, Tom Eiden, Bo Gray, Ottaviano Dell'Acqua as The outlaws
- Forrie J. Smith, Steven G. Tyler, Massimiliano Ubaldi as The cowboys
- Paloma von Broadley as Jessica
- Samantha Waidler as Mary Lou
- Kevin Barker, Brian Barker, Charlie Barker, Pilar O'Connell, Sarah Waidler, Lauren Myers, Natasha Goslow as The sons
- Patrick Myers as Patrick
- Jess Hill as Telegraph clerk
- Geoffrey Martin as Executioner
- Lou Baker as Preacher
- Michael Huddleston: Blacksmith
- Adam Taylor: Blackjack
- Sommer Betsworth: Girl

== See also ==
- List of Christmas films
