= Peeper (film) =

1975 comedy-mystery film directed by Peter Hyams

- Theatrical release poster
- Directed by: Peter Hyams
- Screenplay by: W.D. Richter
- Based on: Deadfall; 1971 novel by Keith Laumer
- Produced by: Robert Chartoff; Irwin Winkler
- Starring: Michael Caine; Natalie Wood; Kitty Winn; Michael Constantine; Liam Dunn; Timothy Agoglia Carey
- Narrated by: Michael Caine; Guy Marks
- Cinematography: Earl Rath
- Edited by: James Mitchell
- Music by: Richard Clements
- Distributed by: 20th Century Fox
- Release date: December 3, 1975
- Running time: 87 minutes
- Country: United States
- Language: English
- Budget: $2,325,000
- Box office: $1-2 million

Peeper is a 1975 American mystery comedy film directed by Peter Hyams, starring Michael Caine as Leslie C. Tucker, a bungling private investigator. A send-up of 1940s films noirs, Peeper was a box-office failure that jeopardized Hyams's career and almost prevented him from obtaining funding to produce Capricorn One.

== Plot ==
The film is set in Los Angeles in 1947. A criminal on the run from hired killers comes to the office of a private detective named Tucker and asks Tucker to find a daughter he left at an orphanage in 1918. The man has a substantial amount of money that he wants to give the girl. Tucker's search leads him to two sisters, daughters of a rich Beverly Hills widow. Tucker is sure one of the sisters is the man's daughter, but he's not sure which is the right one. Meanwhile, the killers chasing Tucker's client are now chasing the detective, and Tucker also discovers that the widow's brother-in-law may be blackmailing the two girls and/or embezzling from the widow. Tucker also keeps encountering a mysterious stranger who seems to know more than he admits, and may or may not be working with the brother-in-law. Ultimately everyone ends up on a cruise ship headed to South America and the various mysteries are resolved.

== Cast ==
- Michael Caine as Leslie C. Tucker
- Natalie Wood as Ellen Prendergast
- Kitty Winn as Marianne Prendergast
- Michael Constantine as Anglich
- Thayer David as Frank Prendergast
- Timothy Carey as Sid (credited as Timothy Agoglia Carey)
- Liam Dunn as Billy Pate
- Don Calfa as Rosie
- Dorothy Adams as Mrs. Prendergast
- Buffy Dee as Bazooka Himself
- Robert Ito as Butler
- Liz Renay as Stripper
- Paul Jabara as Janitor

== Production ==
The film originally was titled Fat Chance and began filming in June 1974. The producers had worked with Peter Hyams on Busting and hired him to rewrite W.D. Richter's script and direct because they liked the comic elements of Busting. In 1975 Keith Laumer's 1971 novel Deadfall, on which the script was based, was republished under the title Fat Chance by Pocket Books in the US and New English Library in the UK with film tie-in covers.

== Reception ==
In 2002, Hyams observed that he "managed to combine critical and commercial failure. And that made me colder than ice. Nobody wanted me."

On the review aggregator website Rotten Tomatoes, 29% of 31 critics' reviews are positive. The website's consensus reads: "Despite a deftly droll performance from Michael Caine, Peeper continually stumbles over its muddled plot and uncertain tone." Variety called it “flimsy whimsy” On the other hand, Bill Cosford's review in The Miami Herald is a rave, calling the film “an absolute charm…that hits the right notes over and over again.”
