= Sinbad and the Caliph of Baghdad =

1973 film

- Directed by: Pietro Francisci
- Written by: Pietro Francisci
- Produced by: Umberto Russo; Vittorio Russo
- Starring: Robert Malcolm; Sonia Wilson; Luigi Bonos; Arturo Dominici
- Cinematography: Gino Santini
- Edited by: Otello Colangeli; Pietro Francisci
- Music by: Alessandro Alessandroni
- Production companies: Buton Film; Roas Produzioni
- Distributed by: Titanus Film
- Release date: 23 June 1973
- Running time: 101 minutes
- Country: Italy
- Language: Italian

Sinbad and the Caliph of Baghdad (Italian: Simbad e il califfo di Bagdad) is a 1973 Italian adventure film directed by Pietro Francisci and starring Robert Malcolm, Sonia Wilson, Luigi Bonos and Arturo Dominici Based on the legend of Sinbad, it was the director Francisci's final film.

It was shot at the Elios Studios in Rome and on location in Egypt. The soundtrack features music from Nikolai Rimsky-Korsakov's Scheherazade.

== Cast ==
- Robert Malcolm as Sinbad / Shariar
- Sonia Wilson (Toti Achilli) as Sherazade
- Luigi Bonos as Firùz
- Leo Valeriano as Bamàn
- Spartaco Conversi as Hassem
- Arturo Dominici as Visir
- Franco Fantasia as Il comandante delle guardie
- Eugene Walter as Zenebi
- Paul Oxon as Il capitano della nave

== Bibliography ==
- Moliterno, Gino. The A to Z of Italian Cinema. Scarecrow Press, 2009.
