= Door into Darkness =

Italian television series

- Italian: La porta sul buio
- Genre: Anthology; Horror
- Created by: Dario Argento
- Composer: Giorgio Gaslini
- Country of origin: Italy
- Original language: Italian
- No. of seasons: 1
- No. of episodes: 4

Production
- Producer: Dario Argento
- Cinematography: Elio Polacchi
- Editors: Amedeo Giomini, Alberto Moro
- Running time: 60 minutes
- Production company: RAI

Original release
- Network: Rai 1
- Release: September 4 – September 25, 1973

Door into Darkness (Italian: La porta sul buio) is an Italian anthology horror television series conceived by Dario Argento. It consists of four one-hour episodes broadcast in 1973.

== Episodes ==
No.	Title	Directed by	Written by
1	"The Neighbor (Italian: Il vicino di casa)"	Luigi Cozzi	Luigi Cozzi
A couple move into an apartment with their newborn. Unbeknownst to the couple, the neighbor upstairs has a terrible secret: Starring: Aldo Reggiani (Luca); Laura Belli (Stefania); Mimmo Palmara (The Neighbor)
2	"The Tram (Italian: Il tram)"	Dario Argento	Dario Argento
A mystery begins with the discovery of a dead woman's body in the titular location and a detective's thought process on how she got there: Starring: Enzo Cerusico (Inspector Giordani); Paola Tedesco (Giulia); Pierluigi Aprà (Roberto Magli); Corrado Olmi (Morini)
3	"The Doll (Italian: La bambola)"	Mario Foglietti	Marcella Elsberger and Mario Foglietti
After a patient of an insane asylum escapes and goes on a killing spree, the police and psychiatrists attempt to work together to apprehend the killer.: Starring: Robert Hoffmann (The Doctor); Mara Venier (Daniela Moreschi); Gianfranco D'Angelo (The Inspector); Umberto Raho (The Psychiatrist); Erika Blanc (Elena Moreschi)
4	"Eyewitness (Italian: Testimone oculare)"	Dario Argento / Luigi Cozzi (Note: The director of credit for this episode is Roberto Pariante, who had worked as an assistant director on Argento's early feature films. Argento was unhappy with Pariante's work on the episode, however, and took over directing duties after four days, completing the remainder of the shoot himself. He then invited Luigi Cozzi to reshoot Pariante's material.)	Dario Argento and Luigi Cozzi
Roberta drives home and nearly hits a woman with her car. When checking the woman, she finds a bullet wound in her chest and sees a man approaching her with a gun.: Starring: Marilù Tolo (Roberta Leoni); Riccardo Salvino (Guido Leoni); Glauco Onorato (Inspector Ronchi); Altea De Nicola (Anna)

== Reception ==
In a retrospective review, Troy Howarth in his book on gialli stated that "The Neighbor" was a "pleasant diversion" and "The Tram" was the series highlight. Howarth declared "The Doll" as "sluggish and predictable" while "Eyewitness" a "marked improvement" from "The Doll".
