= Michele Lupo =

Italian film director

- Born: 4 December 1932; Corleone, Italy
- Died: 27 June 1989 (aged 56); Rome, Italy
- Occupation: Film director
- Years active: 1962–1982

Michele Lupo (4 December 1932 – 27 June 1989) was an Italian film director. He directed 23 films between 1962 and 1982. He was born in Corleone, Italy, and died on 27 June 1989 in a clinic in Rome, Italy at the age of 56.

== Selected filmography ==
- Colossus of the Arena (1962)
- Maciste, l'eroe più grande del mondo (1963)
- Seven Slaves Against the World (1964)
- La vendetta di Spartacus (1964)
- Seven Rebel Gladiators (1965)
- Arizona Colt (1966)
- Master Stroke (1967)
- Seven Times Seven (1968)
- Your Turn to Die (1969)
- Una storia d'amore (Love Me, Baby, Love Me!) (1969)
- The Weekend Murders (1970)
- Stanza 17-17 palazzo delle tasse, ufficio imposte (1971)
- The Master Touch (1972)
- Ben and Charlie (1972)
- Mean Frank and Crazy Tony (1973)
- Africa Express (1975)
- California (1977)
- They Called Him Bulldozer (1978)
- The Sheriff and the Satellite Kid (1979)
- Everything Happens to Me (1980)
- Buddy Goes West (1981)
- Bomber (1982)
