= Marcello Fondato =

Italian film director (1924–2008)

- Born: 8 January 1924; Rome, Italy
- Died: 13 November 2008 (aged 84); San Felice Circeo
- Occupations: Screenwriter, film director
- Years active: 1958–2008

Marcello Fondato (8 January 1924 – 13 November 2008) was an Italian screenwriter and film director. He wrote for 46 films between 1958 and 1986. He also directed ten films between 1968 and 1992. His 1970 film Ninì Tirabusciò: la donna che inventò la mossa was entered into the 21st Berlin International Film Festival. He was born in Rome, Italy and died in San Felice Circeo of a cerebral hemorrhage aged 84.

== Filmography ==
=== As director ===
- The Protagonists (1968)
- Diary of a Telephone Operator (1969)
- Ninì Tirabusciò: la donna che inventò la mossa (1970)
- Watch Out, We're Mad! (1974)
- The Immortal Bachelor (1975)
- Charleston (1977)

=== As screenwriter ===
- Wives and Obscurities (1956)
- The Beautiful Legs of Sabrina (1959)
- The Friend of the Jaguar (1959)
- Everybody Go Home (1960)
- Black Sabbath (1963)
- Three Nights of Love (1964)
- Blood and Black Lace (1964)
- I complessi (1965)
- They Called Him Bulldozer (1978)
- The Sheriff and the Satellite Kid (1979)
- Everything Happens to Me (1980)
- Bomber (1982)
