= Luigi Bonos =

Italian actor (1910–2000)

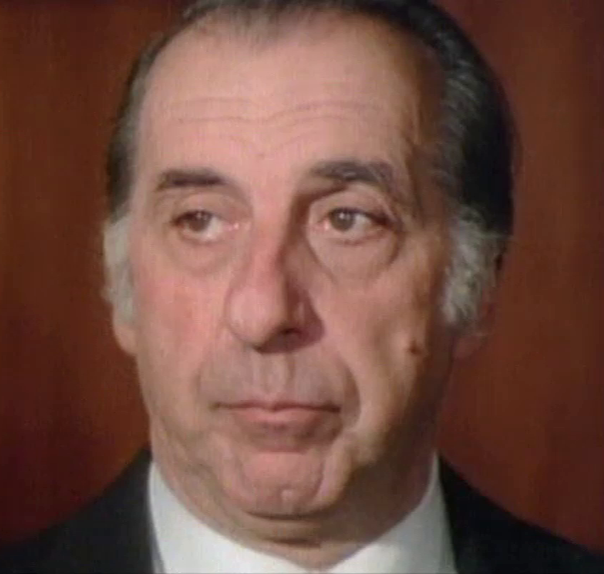
- Bonos in The Exorcist: Italian Style (1975)
- Born: 6 May 1910; Berlin, Germany
- Died: 8 August 2000 (aged 90)
- Occupation: Actor
- Years active: 1945–1992

Luigi Bonos (6 May 1910 – 8 August 2000) was an Italian comedian and stage, television and film actor. He appeared in more than 70 films between 1945 and 1992.

Born in Berlin, Germany, the son of two Hungarian circus artists, along with his brothers Vittorio (1908 - 1966) and Giovanni (1907-1956) Bonos formed a trio of comedians who met large success in the avanspettacolo and revue theater between the 1930s and 1940s. He made his film debut in 1951, and since then he appeared in dozens of comedy films, usually as a character actor. He died in 2000.

== Selected filmography ==
- L'ippocampo (1945) - Un acrobato
- The Whole City Sings (1945)
- Era lui... sì! sì! (1951) - Cameriere
- The Overcoat (1952) - (uncredited)
- Primo premio: Mariarosa (1952)
- I morti non pagano tasse (1952)
- The Tired Outlaw (1952)
- Era lei che lo voleva (1954) - The Cook at Invernaghi's (uncredited)
- Laugh! Laugh! Laugh! (1954) - Mimo
- Tunis Top Secret (1959) - Pedro
- The Last Judgment (1961)
- Colpo gobbo all'italiana (1962)
- Damon and Pythias (1962)
- I motorizzati (1962) - Franco
- The Girl Who Knew Too Much (1963) - Albergo Stelletta
- Il segno di Zorro (1963) - padre Diaz
- Gidget Goes to Rome (1963) - Museum Official (uncredited)
- Castle of the Living Dead (1964) - Marc
- Killer Caliber .32 (1967) - Alonso - Mine Worker (uncredited)
- The Biggest Bundle of Them All (1968) - Old House Owner (uncredited)
- Madigan's Millions (1968) - Lift operator
- The Longest Hunt (1968) - Sgt. Peck
- Indovina chi viene a merenda? (1969) - German Soldier
- Let It All Hang Out (1969) - Taubenheim, Kunsthändler
- The Thirteen Chairs (1969) - Dicky (uncredited)
- Oh, Grandmother's Dead (1969)
- Madame Bovary (1969) - Herzog von Artois
- The Five Man Army (1969) - Priest (uncredited)
- The Secret of Santa Vittoria (1969) - Benedetti
- And God Said to Cain (1970) - Joë
- Paths of War (1970) - Barman (uncredited)
- Formula 1 - Nell'inferno del Grand Prix (1970)
- I Am Sartana, Trade Your Guns for a Coffin (1970) - Posada Owner
- The Golden Ass (1970) - Husband of Birrena
- Mr. Superinvisible (1970)
- Defeat of the Mafia (1970) - Giulio
- They Call Me Trinity (1970) - Ozgur - Bartender
- Fantasia Among the Squares (1971) - Le Sheriff
- La Poudre d'escampette (1971) - Un soldat italien sur la plage
- Armiamoci e partite! (1971) - Baron's Adjutant
- Trinity Is Still My Name (1971) - Bartender Ozgur
- Si può fare molto con 7 donne (1972) - Costa
- Chronicle of a Homicide (1972)
- I due gattoni a nove code... e mezza ad Amsterdam (1972) - Big Bon
- What? (1972) - Painter
- Frankenstein 80 (1972) - Hobo
- Now They Call Him Sacramento (1972) - Old Tequila
- Lo chiamavano Verità (1972) - Pierre, the Waiter
- Even Angels Eat Beans (1973) - Italian Merchant (uncredited)
- Sinbad and the Caliph of Baghdad (1973) - Firùz
- ...e così divennero i 3 supermen del West (1973) - Professor Aristide Panzarotti
- Più forte sorelle (1973) - Timothy
- House of 1000 Pleasures (1973) - Baba
- Pasqualino Cammarata, Frigate Captain (1974)
- Laß jucken, Kumpel 3. Teil - Maloche, Bier und Bett (1974) - Luckys Vater
- Sesso in testa (1974)
- Charleston (1974) - Hotel Porter (uncredited)
- Il sergente Rompiglioni diventa... caporale (1975)
- The Flower in His Mouth (1975) - Canaino
- The Exorcist: Italian Style (1975) - Dr. Schnautzer
- La nipote del prete (1976) - Prete
- San Pasquale Baylonne protettore delle donne (1976) - Antonio Pocaterra
- As of Tomorrow (1976) - Art Director (uncredited)
- Death Rage (1976) - Peppiniello
- Merciless Man (1976)
- Carioca tigre (1976) - Talazar
- Il signor Ministro li pretese tutti e subito (1977) - Fulgenzio Cherubini
- March or Die (1977) - Andre
- Mad Dog (1977) - Pappalardo
- Grazie tante - Arrivederci (1977)
- They Called Him Bulldozer (1978) - Bulldozers pal, trying to build him a new motor drive
- The Sheriff and the Satellite Kid (1979) - Deputy Allen
- Bertoldo, Bertoldino e Cacasenno (1984)
- Il burbero (1986) - Una guardia
- They Call Me Renegade (1987) - Bartender
- There Was a Castle with Forty Dogs (1990) - Barritore d'asta
- The King's Whore (1990) - 2nd Priest
- À demain (1992)
- Once a Year, Every Year (1994)
