= Charleston (1977 film) =

1977 film by Marcello Fondato

- Original theatrical poster
- Directed by: Marcello Fondato
- Written by: Marcello Fondato; Francesco Scardamaglia
- Produced by: Elio Scardamaglia
- Starring: Bud Spencer; James Coco; Herbert Lom
- Cinematography: Mario Montuori
- Edited by: Nadia Bonifazi
- Music by: Maurizio De Angelis; Guido De Angelis
- Distributed by: Delfo Cinematografica; Analysis Film Releasing Corporation
- Release date: 5 March 1977
- Running time: 105 min.
- Country: Italy
- Languages: Italian; English

Charleston is a 1977 Italian comedy film written and directed by Marcello Fondato. It reprises the style of the film The Sting (1973). It was distributed in the United States by Analysis Film Releasing Corporation.

== Plot summary ==
Joe Lo Monaco is an owner of a steamship which has a large casino. A band of evildoers exploits him for his earnings about gambling on roulette. Lo Monaco really wants to destroy the ship, but he realizes the ship is insured and that destroying it would lose a lot of money. Meanwhile in London, the trickster Charleston is arrested for being found with a false identity. However, he manages to escape from prison as soon as he is offered the job of helping Lo Monaco from evildoers.

== Cast ==
- Bud Spencer as Charleston
- James Coco as Joe Lo Monaco
- Herbert Lom as Inspector Watkins
- Jack La Cayenne as Jack Watson / Columbus
- Dino Emanuelli as Bull
- Ronald Lacey as Frankie
- Geoffrey Bayldon as Fred
- Renzo Marignano as Morris
- Lucretia Love as Secretary
