= Liam Dunn =

American actor (1916–1976)

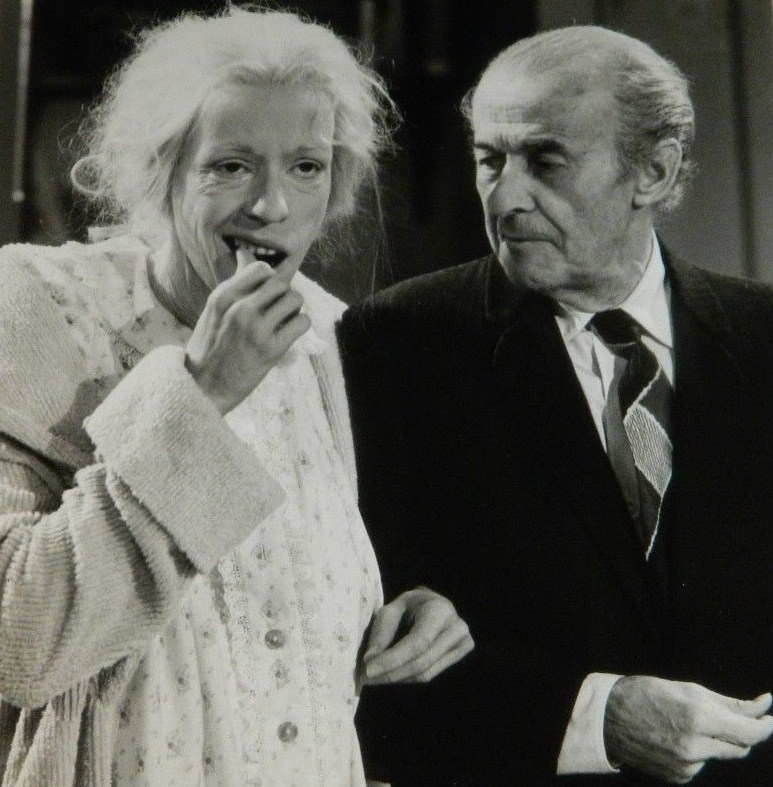
- Carol Burnett with Liam Dunn in Twigs, 1975
- Born: November 12, 1916; New Jersey, U.S.
- Died: April 11, 1976 (aged 59); Granada Hills, California, U.S.
- Occupation: Actor
- Years active: 1947–1976

Liam Dunn (November 12, 1916 – April 11, 1976) was an American character actor.

== Life and career ==
The New Jersey native's early career was spent on television in series such as Bonanza, Room 222, Alias Smith and Jones, Mannix, Emergency! [S5Ep18] as "Amos", and Gunsmoke.

Dunn's breakout role was as the judge (and Barbra Streisand's character's father) in the 1972 film What's Up, Doc?, for which he was noticed by Mel Brooks, who was in the process of forming a stock company of actors. Dunn went on to appear in Brooks films, including Blazing Saddles (1974) as Rev. Johnson, Young Frankenstein (1974) as Mr. Hilltop, and as the Newsvendor in Silent Movie (1976). He also appeared in several Walt Disney productions, such as The World's Greatest Athlete (1973), Charley and the Angel (1973), Herbie Rides Again (1974) and Gus (1976).

He frequently portrayed characters who were verbally and/or physically abused in a slapstick way. Additional television credits include Twigs, All in the Family, Barney Miller, McMillan & Wife, Rhoda, Sanford and Son, and The Mary Tyler Moore Show, S4Ep6. Additional film credits included roles in Catch-22 (1970), The Great Northfield Minnesota Raid (1972), A Reflection of Fear (1972), Emperor of the North Pole (1973), Papillon (1973), Killer Bees (1974), Bank Shot (1974), At Long Last Love (1975), The Night That Panicked America (1975), Peeper (1976) and High Velocity (1976).

Dunn collapsed on the set of Disney's The Shaggy D.A. (1976) during the filming of the roller rink sequence, and as soon as he was hospitalized, died on April 11, 1976, from emphysema in Granada Hills, California. John Fiedler was brought in to complete the role as dog catcher. Though only 59 at the time of his death, Dunn always looked much older than he was, and he was cast accordingly.

== Filmography ==
Year	Title	Role	Notes
1947	That's My Man	Reporter	Uncredited
1970	Catch-22	Father	
1972	Sanford & Son	Gus	
1972	What's Up, Doc?	Judge Maxwell	
1972	The Great Northfield Minnesota Raid	Drummer	
1972	A Reflection of Fear	Coroner	
1973	The World's Greatest Athlete	Dr. Winslow	
1973	Charley and the Angel	Dr. Sprague	
1973	Emperor of the North Pole	Smile	
1973	Isn't It Shocking?	Myron Flagg	
1973	Papillon	Old Trustee	
1974	Blazing Saddles	Rev. Johnson	
1974	Herbie Rides Again	Doctor	
1974	Killer Bees	Zeb Tucker	
1974	Bank Shot	Painter	
1974	Young Frankenstein	Mr. Hilltop	
1975	At Long Last Love	Harry	
1975	The Night That Panicked America	Charlie	
1975	Peeper	Billy Pate	
1976	Silent Movie	Newsvendor	
1976	Gus	Dr. Morgan	
1976	High Velocity	Bennett	
1976	The Shaggy D.A.	Dogcatcher	Uncredited
