= I'm for the Hippopotamus =

- Italian theatrical release poster by Renato Casaro
- Directed by: Italo Zingarelli
- Written by: Barbara Alberti; Amedeo Pagani; Vincenzo Mannino; Italo Zingarelli
- Produced by: Vincent G. Cox; Roberto Palaggi
- Starring: Terence Hill; Bud Spencer; Joe Bugner
- Cinematography: Aiace Parolin
- Edited by: Claudio M. Cutry
- Music by: Walter Rizzati
- Release date: 1979
- Running time: 104 minutes
- Country: Italy

I'm for the Hippopotamus (Italian: Io sto con gli ippopotami) is a 1979 Italian adventure comedy film directed by Italo Zingarelli and starring the film duo of Terence Hill and Bud Spencer.

The film was mostly shot in South Africa. It focuses on the rivalry between two cousins, with one of them intentionally undermining the other's safari expeditions. The cousins eventually set aside their differences when they have to team up against a common foe.

== Plot ==
In 1950 Tom (Spencer) is a Safari organizer in Rhodesia. He is an animal lover at heart and secretly give his clients rifles loaded with blanks. His life changes with the arrival of his cousin and former business partner Slim (Hill). Both men have been raised by a Zimbabwean woman after they lost their parents, but they don't see eye to eye. Eventually they have to team up when they are threatened by Jack Ormond (Bugner), a local gangster trafficking ivory.

When Ormond fails to buy out Tom and Slim, he decides to teach them a lesson by destroying their safari bus. Tom and Slim retaliate by freeing the animals caged in Osmond's estate. The local police get them arrested but they manage to escape to travel to the Zambesi river, where they pose as dockworkers and board one of Osmond's cargo ships loaded with ivory and wild animals en route to Canada. After a fight with Osmond and his men, Tom and Slim take control of the ship, free the animals and sail across the Ocean to the Maldives. In the final scene, the ship's captain warns Tom and Slim that they are committing an act of piracy and the matter is far from over, to which Slim replies: 'No, no, the matter is definitely over'.

== Cast ==
- Terence Hill as Slim
- Bud Spencer as Tom
- Joe Bugner as Ormond
- May Dlamini as Mama Leone
- Dawn Jürgens as Stella (Slim's lady-love)
- Malcolm Kirk as Ormond's bald henchman
- Ben Masinga as Jason
- Les Marcowitz as Trixie, Ormond's short henchman
- Johan Naude
- Nick Van Rensburg
- Hugh Rouse as Police Captain, arresting Slim and Tom
- Mike Schutte as Ormond's henchman (German version: Lumpi)
- Kosie Smith as Ormond's henchman with moustache (German version: Kopf, wie 'n Hauklotz)
- Joseph Szucs
- Sandy Nkomo as Senghor (Stella's father)

== Soundtrack ==
As with many other Spencer & Hill films, its soundtrack and theme song "Grau Grau Grau" (both composed and performed by Walter Rizzati, with Spencer himself providing lead vocals on the song) became very popular in Italy at the time of the film's release, and are still popular among the duo's international fan base.
