= Odds and Evens (film) =

1978 Italian film directed by Sergio Corbucci

Odds and Evens -Pari e dispari-
- Directed by: Sergio Corbucci
- Written by: Mario Amendola, Bruno Corbucci
- Starring: Terence Hill; Bud Spencer
- Music by: Guido De Angelis; Maurizio De Angelis
- Release date: 28 October 1978
- Running time: 110 minutes
- Country: Italy

Odds and Evens (Italian: Pari e dispari also known as Trinity: Gambling for High Stakes) is an Italian action comedy film directed in 1978 by Sergio Corbucci and starring the film duo of Terence Hill and Bud Spencer. The film is set in Florida. In the film, a US Marine and his half-brother join forces against the American Mafia and its gambling operations.

In 1979 it was awarded with the Golden Screen Award along with Superman and Close Encounters of the Third Kind.

== Plot ==
The Mafia runs an illegal betting sweepstake in Florida. Johnny Firpo, a US Marine from Miami, is tasked to bust this ring. He is tasked with teaming up with gambler turned trucker Charlie Firpo, who is - unknowingly - Johnny's half-brother. To ensure he gets help from Charlie, whom had given up on gambling in an earlier incident against Paragoulis The Greek which resulted in Charlie smashing everything in sight and allegedly breaking Paragoulis' nose, Johnny tricks Charlie into giving him a ride to Miami, then stealing the truck Charlie rode in using the henchmen of Paragoulis as a distraction after offering said truck as payment for losing a poker game.

Johnny reveals that he's Charlie's brother after another fight against the Mafia during a car rally, and telling Charlie he was wanting to earn money from gambling for an eye operation for their father, whom was supposedly blinded by the Mafia, though unknown to Charlie this is a ruse in order to get him to co-operate. This co-operation is first coming to fruition in a horse race where Johnny takes the place of the rider of the horse Lightning Rod, Sam Stallion, in order to win the race, while Charlie tricks one of the 'bookies' into taking an 11-to-1 odds bet on Lightning Rod. Afterwards, Charlie teaches Johnny about the various hands dealt in poker, though an encounter between their father and Paraboulis' henchmen nearly exposes the ruse, but Johnny distracts Charlie enough to make the ruse still stand for the time being.

After winning another betting match during a game of pelota, helped by Charlie impersonating a former pelota star player to ensure the win, Johnny is then taken to a cruise ship in international waters, the main base of operations of Paragoulis the Greek, where he is invited to a 'friendly family game' of poker with Paraboulis after making a big win at the roulette table, where he uses Charlie's teachings to win match after match, though Charlie intervenes after the ruse is exposed, initially confronting Johnny about it, before the two brothers turn on and beat up Paragoulis the Greek and his henchmen, rolling up the entire illegal gambling ring.

== Cast ==
- Terence Hill as Johnny Firpo
- Bud Spencer as Charlie Firpo
- Jerry Lester as Mike Firpo
- Luciano Catenacci as Paragoulis the Greek
- Marisa Laurito as Sister Susanna
- Salvatore Borgese as Ninfus
- Riccardo Pizzuti as Smilzo
- Claudio Ruffini as Bugsy
- Sergio Smacchi as Mancino
- Carlo Reali as Admiral
- Vincenzo Maggio as Tappo
- Woody Woodbury as Admiral O'Connor
- Kim McKay as Pupa

== Reception ==
The film was the second most popular Italian film of the 1978-79 season behind Amori miei.
