= Buddy Goes West =

1981 film by Michele Lupo

- Original DVD cover - Art by Renato Casaro
- Directed by: Michele Lupo
- Written by: Sergio Donati
- Produced by: Claudio Mancini; Horst Wendlandt
- Starring: Bud Spencer
- Cinematography: Franco Di Giacomo
- Music by: Ennio Morricone
- Release date: 1981
- Running time: 92 min
- Country: Italy
- Language: Italian

Buddy Goes West (Italian: Occhio alla penna, also known as A fist goes West) is a 1981 Spaghetti Western comedy film directed by Michele Lupo.

== Plot ==
In the Old West, a mysterious man, nicknamed "Doc", arrives in a dusty town. Doc is a bandit who robbed a city physician, keeping his instruments' briefcase. He is misunderstood by local residents for a real doctor, and induced to care in particular for sick children. While treating them, Doc becomes aware that the small town is harassed by a criminal gang that bribes the sheriff. Doc immediately proclaims himself the new sheriff, and proceeds to hunt down the bandits.

== Cast ==
- Bud Spencer: Buddy
- Amidou: Girolamo
- Joe Bugner: Sheriff Bronson
- Riccardo Pizzuti: Colorado Slim
- Carlo Reali: Sarto
- Renato Scarpa: Logan
- Sara Franchetti: Witwe Gordon
- Giovanni Cianfriglia: Jack Bolt
- Nazzareno Zamperla: Slim Henchman (uncredited)
