= Johan Naude =

South African surgeon

Johan Naude is a South African surgeon and urologist. Naude was former president of the South African Urological Association and a pioneering transplant surgeon who worked closely with legendary heart transplant surgeon Christiaan Barnard.

== Training ==
Johan Naude qualified in medicine at the University of Pretoria in South Africa in 1963. He worked for a year in a mission hospital in the Eastern Caprivi Strip before doing a year's training in anatomical pathology.

He trained in general surgery and urology at Groote Schuur Hospital, where he ran the kidney transplant unit. He was head of the department of urology at the universities of Natal, Johannesburg, and Cape Town.

== Career ==
He is a past president of the South African Urological Association and served on the executive committee of the South African Medical and Dental Council. He served as urology representative on the senate of the Colleges of Medicine of South Africa. He has been visiting professor to numerous academic institutions, including a year at the University College London. He was guest professor at the New York section of the American Urological Association. Naude is the only South African elected to honorary membership of the British Association of Urological Surgeons. During 2003 and 2004 he worked in Mozambique, where he helped to establish a department of urology at the teaching hospital in Maputo.

Surgical procedures devised by him are described in the standard British and American textbooks of urological surgery. He delivered the opening address and chaired the International symposium on "Reconstructive Urological Surgery in the Tropics" in Hawaii in 2004. Naude is a staunch advocate of racial equality, and during the apartheid era, became the first Urology department head at the University of KwaZulu-Natal (now Nelson R. Mandela School of Medicine), the first medical school in South Africa open to all races.
