= Cat and Dog =

1983 Italian crime comedy film

- Italian theatrical release poster by Casaro
- Directed by: Bruno Corbucci
- Written by: Bruno Corbucci; Mario Amendola
- Starring: Bud Spencer; Tomas Milian
- Cinematography: Silvano Ippoliti
- Edited by: Daniele Alabiso
- Music by: La Bionda
- Release date: 11 February 1983 (Italy)
- Running time: 96 minutes
- Country: Italy
- Languages: Italian; English

Cat and Dog (Italian: Cane e gatto, also known as Thieves and Robbers and Cats and Dogs) is a 1983 Italian crime comedy film directed by Bruno Corbucci.

== Plot ==
A playboy (Tomas Milian) who makes a living out of seducing women and stealing their jewellery accidentally ends up witnessing a Mafia murder. He must work together with the man who has been constantly trying to catch him, Lt. Alan Parker (Bud Spencer), in order to save his life.

== Cast ==
- Bud Spencer: Lt. Alan Parker (dubbed by Edward Mannix)
- Tomas Milian: Tony Roma (alias Antonio Rosario Archibald Pipino)
- Margherita Fumero: Deborah Smith
- Marc Lawrence: Salvatore Licuti
- Darcy Shean: Marianne
- Billy Garrigues: Sgt. Haig
- Raymond Forchion: angry man

== Release ==
The film premiered in Italy on 11 February 1983. An Italian voice cast dubbed the English-speaking original cast.
