= Even Angels Eat Beans =

- Original DVD cover – Art by Renato Casaro
- Directed by: Enzo Barboni
- Produced by: Tritone Cinematografica – Rome
- Starring: Giuliano Gemma; Bud Spencer; Robert Middleton
- Cinematography: Francisco Marín
- Edited by: Eugenio Alabiso
- Music by: Guido De Angelis; Maurizio De Angelis
- Distributed by: CEIAD – Rome
- Release date: 1973
- Running time: 123 minutes
- Country: Italy
- Language: Italian/English

Even Angels Eat Beans (Italian: Anche gli angeli mangiano fagioli) is a 1973 Italian comedy film written and directed by Enzo Barboni with Giuliano Gemma and Bud Spencer. It was awarded with the Golden Screen Award in 1974.

The film produced a sequel in 1974, Charleston (Anche gli angeli tirano di destro), still directed by Enzo Barboni. Spencer refused to reprise his role, and was replaced with Ricky Bruch.

== Plot ==
New York, 1930s. Sonny is a former ice cream man who fell on hard luck. While working as a cleaner in a gym, he meets Charlie Smith, a wrestler. The two become fast friends, although they have very different characters, Charlie being blunt and aloof, and Sonny being narcissistic and too prone to womanizing. One day they get hired by a mobster, Angelo, to hit a gambler but they erroneously beat up a US Senator instead, who in turns declares a war towards the underworld. To save them from the heat, Angelo sends Charlie and Sonny to little Italy to work as debt collectors. Here, however, they befriend the Geraces, a poor family, and decide to help them by beating up two other collectors sent by a rival of Angelo, Mr. Colosimo. The event triggers a bitter conflict between Angelo and Colosimo. Eventually the police, led by Captain Mackintosh, intervenes to stop the bloodshed. Mackintosh is initially determined to jail Charlie and Sonny for their involvement. However, when Charlie and Sonny discovers that Mackintosh is somehow implicated with Angelo and Colosimo in their business, he is forced to let them go. Following their acquittal, Charlie returns to wrestling, and Sonny agrees on being his trainer.

== Production ==
The film was originally intended to star the film duo of Bud Spencer and Terence Hill, but Hill dropped out of the project as he was concerned about overexposure. Principal photography took place in New York and Rome. The soundtrack was composed by Guido and Maurizio De Angelis, and produced a minor hit with the single Angel and Beans performed by the American-Italian pop duo Kathy & Gulliver.

== Cast ==
- Giuliano Gemma: Sonny
- Bud Spencer: Charlie Smith
- Robert Middleton: Angelo
- Víctor Israel: Judah
- Bill Vanders: Captain Mackintosh
- Steffen Zacharias: Mr. Gerace
- Margherita Horowitz: Ms. Gerace
- Lara Sender: Mr & Ms Gerace's Daughter
- Luigi Bonos: Italian Merchant
- George Rigaud: Senator O'Riordan
- Gérard Landry: Spectator at the Wrestling contest
- Riccardo Pizzuti: "The Cobra"
- Mario Brega: Angelo's Weapon Master
- Alvaro Vitali: Tailor Assistant
