= Trinity Is Still My Name =

1971 film by Enzo Barboni

Trinity Is Still My Name (...continuavano a chiamarlo Trinità)
- U.S. theatrical release poster
- Directed by: Enzo Barboni
- Screenplay by: Enzo Barboni; English version: Gene Luotto
- Produced by: Italo Zingarelli
- Starring: Terence Hill; Bud Spencer; Yanti Somer; Dana Ghia; Enzo Tarascio; Emilio Delle Piane; Harry Carey Jr.
- Cinematography: Aldo Giordani
- Edited by: Antonio Siciliano
- Music by: Guido & Maurizio De Angelis
- Production company: West Film
- Distributed by: Delta (Italy); AVCO Embassy Pictures (US, theatrical)
- Release dates: October 21, 1971 (Italy); July 20, 1972 (United States)
- Running time: 128 minutes
- Country: Italy
- Box office: 14,554,172 admissions (Italy) $2,100,000 (US/ Canada rentals)

Trinity Is Still My Name (Italian: ...continuavano a chiamarlo Trinità, lit. "...They Kept Calling Him Trinity") is a 1971 Italian spaghetti Western comedy film directed by Enzo Barboni. Starring the film duo of Terence Hill and Bud Spencer, it is a direct sequel to They Call Me Trinity (1970). It was shot extensively in Campo Imperatore, Abruzzo. It was the highest-grossing Italian film to that point in time. In 1995, a sequel was made, Sons of Trinity, as a continuation of the Trinity series.

== Plot ==
In the opening sequence, Bambino (Bud Spencer) is walking through the desert carrying his saddle and finds four escaped convicts, from whom he steals their beans and horses. This scene is followed by the opening credits and the title song, after which Trinity (Terence Hill) is on his travois. He too comes across the convicts frying more beans, and also tricks them.

Trinity then continues to his family home and finds Bambino having a bath. Trinity smells so bad that he is told to bathe, too, before everyone starts lunch. When the four convicts show up and try to rob the family, the mother sneaks around from the back and ushers them out with a shotgun after they are relieved yet again of their guns and money.

That night, the father pretends to be dying and makes Trinity and Bambino promise to work together. As Bambino is teaching Trinity how to be a successful horse thief, they see a wagon with two tired mules and decide to rob the passengers. But all they find is a family with a sick baby (nicknamed "Little Windy" by Bambino) and a young girl who falls for Trinity. The family isn't moving because of a broken wheel, so Bambino lifts the wagon and Trinity changes the wheel, before giving the family some of the money they have stolen. As the film progresses they keep encountering the family, with much the same gags.

When Trinity and Bambino arrive in town, they head to the local saloon. Inside, Trinity, Bambino, and two cowboys play cards with a professional sharper named Wild Card Hendricks. Thanks to his superior skills, Trinity deals everybody a potentially winning hand. However, his cards are better, so he wins and is accused by Hendricks of being a cheat. When they square off, Trinity displays his extreme speed by drawing his gun a number of times, each time holstering it and then slapping Hendricks in the face, all before Wild Card can react. As he leaves, Wild Card tries to shoot Trinity from behind but is foiled once again.

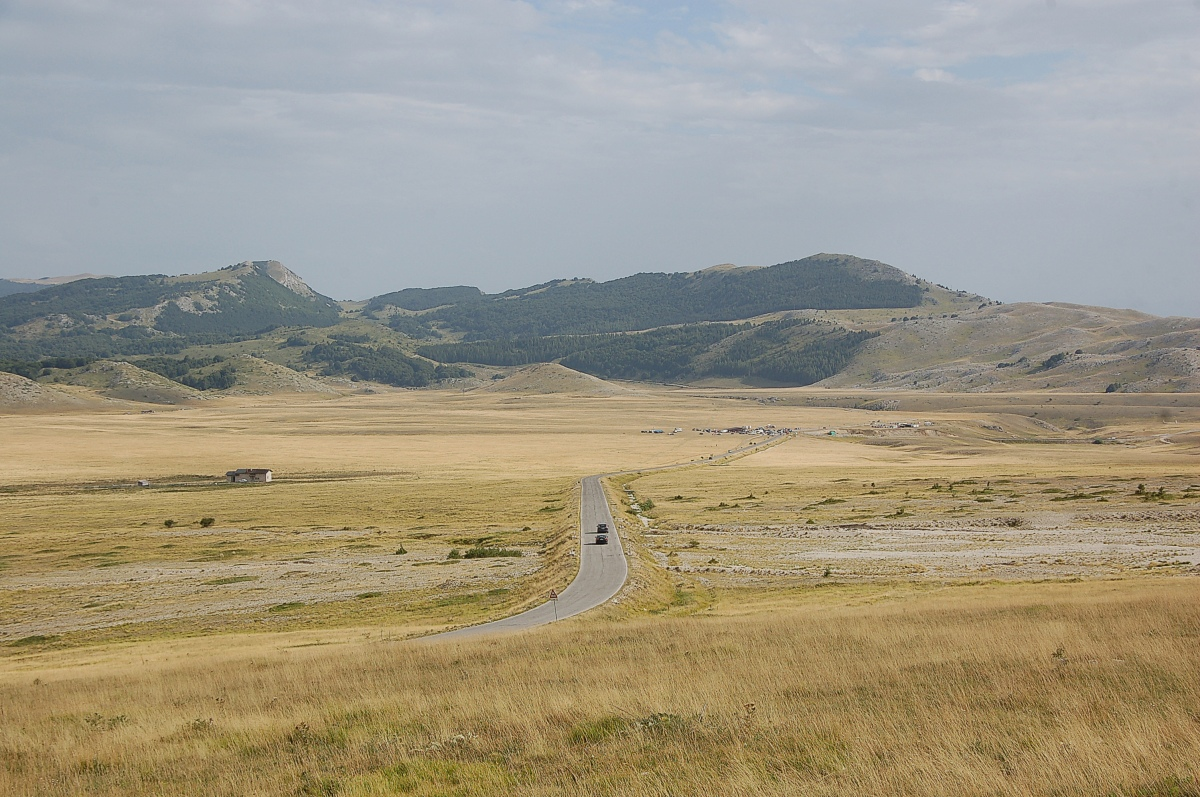
Campo Imperatore valley in Abruzzo

Trinity and Bambino buy new suits with their winnings. Running into the family they helped earlier, they convince the family that they are federal agents working undercover as supposed outlaws, with Bambino as "The Captain" and Trinity "The Lieutenant". Then the brothers go into a smart restaurant for dinner, consuming huge quantities of food with a notable lack of table manners. When they leave, they meet a man who, believing the story about their being federal agents, gives them four thousand dollars to "keep their eyes shut".

The two brothers now travel to a town called San José where they start a bar brawl with some convicts they recognize. These they take to the local sheriff for the bounty. The sheriff informs Trinity and Bambino that everyone in San José works for the man who paid them the four thousand dollars and that they should avoid the local mission especially. Paying a visit to the mission to check things out, Bambino pretends that he has come to confess, considerably shocking the priest with his long list of transgressions (covered up by loud organ music so the audience can't hear).

That night they find that the man who paid them off also uses the mission for gun-running and to store stolen loot, with his men disguised as monks. The brothers convince the real monks into helping them beat the outlaws, while actually planning to take the loot for themselves. After a long fight, which the brothers and the monks naturally win, a group of Rangers shows up and arrests the outlaws. One of them thinks he recognizes Bambino as a wanted horse thief; to allay his suspicions, Trinity repeats that they are federal agents and gives the Ranger the stolen loot.

As they ride away squabbling, they see the pioneering family stuck fording the river (as they were once before) and the film ends with Trinity riding down to help them.

== Cast ==
- Terence Hill – Trinity
- Bud Spencer – Bambino
- Yanti Somer – Trinity's girl, the farmer's daughter
- Harry Carey, Jr. – Trinity and Bambino's father
- Jessica Dublin – Farrah, Trinity and Bambino's mother
- Emilio Delle Piane – Parker
- Enzo Tarascio – sheriff
- Pupo De Luca – head monk
- Benito Stefanelli – Stingary Smith
- Riccardo Pizzuti – chief of the Dallas gunmen
- Enzo Fiermonte – wandering farmer
- Dana Ghia – farmer's wife
- Franco Ressel – maitre d'
- Gérard Landry – Lopert
- Luigi Bonos – Ozgur, the bartender
- Antonio Monselesan – Wild Card Hendricks

== Box office ==
The film was a huge financial success, becoming the top-grossing Italian film up to then, with 14,554,172 admissions in Italy – a distinction previously held by its predecessor, They Call Me Trinity. With 12,267,000 visitors, this movie is the seventh most successful film in Germany to date.
