= Go for It (1983 film) =

Go for It (Nati con la camicia)
- Theatrical release poster by Renato Casaro
- Directed by: Enzo Barboni
- Written by: Marco Barboni
- Produced by: Josi W. Konski
- Starring: Terence Hill; Bud Spencer; Buffy Dee
- Cinematography: Ben McDermot
- Edited by: Eugene Ballaby
- Music by: Franco Micalizzi
- Release date: 1983
- Running time: 104 minutes
- Countries: Italy; United States
- Language: English

Go for It (Italian: Nati con la camicia) is a 1983 Italian action comedy film and spy film parody starring the film duo of Terence Hill and Bud Spencer. It was filmed in Miami, Florida.

The film features a duo of brawlers who meet by chance in a roadhouse. Due to a misunderstanding, they drive away in a truck which does not belong to them. After evading a highway patrol, they attempt to flee together. Instead, they find themselves working for the CIA.

== Plot ==
The charming dodger Rosco Frazer and Doug O’Riordan, a recently released convict who was imprisoned for sinking a yacht which had annoyed him, meet each other during a rough brawl in a roadhouse. They drive off in a truck, each one thinking of the other as the trucker. Not long afterwards a highway patrol stops them for speeding, and since they cannot produce proper papers, they are mistaken for truck-jackers. Thanks to Rosco being a ventriloquist, however, they are able to get away.

Doug would rather run off alone but can't get rid of Rosco, who has taken a liking to him. Together they drive to the airport in order to go into hiding in some other state. Since the flight to Miami is already booked up, they pose as passengers Steinberg and Mason, who have failed to collect their tickets, not knowing these two are CIA top agents on a mission. As such, they are intercepted by an agent just before their flight takes off and given a suitcase containing one million dollars. After various mishaps and entanglements they are taken to the CIA headquarters to meet "Tiger", their new boss, and are asked on several occasions to omit various embarrassing incidents which would cast a bad light on the CIA staff involved from their final report.

In order to track down a mysterious secret organization hiding in Miami Beach, Rosco and Doug are tasked to impersonate rich Texans. They succeed quite well at this and in the end manage to track down K1, a megalomaniac criminal who wants to erase mankind's understanding of all numbers with his "K-Bomb", plunging the world into chaos. They put a stop to his plan, but in the end they can't benefit from their perks and the million dollars because an overeager "Tiger" has already given the money back to the government; a visit to the president is all they get out of it.

== Cast ==
- Terence Hill as Rosco Frazer / Agent Steinberg
- Bud Spencer as Doug O'Riordan / Agent Mason
- Buffy Dee as Villain K1
- David Huddleston as Tiger
- Riccardo Pizzuti as Mr. Spider
- Faith Minton as The Vamp / La Fatalona
- Dan Rambo as Jeremy Scott
- Susan Teesdale as Barmaid
- Dan Fitzgerald as Leonard
- Woody Woodbury as Agent On Plane

== See also ==
- List of Italian films of 1983
