= Extralarge =

- Starring: Bud Spencer; Philip Michael Thomas; Michael Winslow; Lou Bedford
- Country of origin: Italy
- Original language: English
- No. of seasons: 2
- No. of episodes: 12

Original release
- Network: Rai 2 (Season 1); Canale 5 (season 2)
- Release: November 12, 1991 – May 2, 1993

Extralarge (original title: Detective Extralarge, aka Zwei Supertypen in Miami) is a television series starring Bud Spencer, Philip Michael Thomas, and Michael Winslow.

== Production ==
The series was first announced in October 1990. The first season was co-produced by RAI and First Group International, a production company founded by Spencer's son Giuseppe Pedersoli. The second season was co-produced by Mediaset. Over the years, reruns have appeared on Channel 4, La7 and satellite channels RaiSat Premium and Sky Movies.

== Plot ==
Jack Costello (Bud Spencer) is a retired cop and now private detective who lives in Miami, who handles a myriad of cases for unusual clients. At his side are old police buddy Sam Bosley (Lou Bedford) and cartoonist-turned-amateur sleuth Jean Philippe Dumas (Philip Michael Thomas), who is using Costello as an influence and has nicknamed the burly detective "Extralarge." In the second series, Costello faces other dangerous cases, again with Bosley and Archibald (Michael Winslow), the son of an old friend, who Costello nicknames "Dumas."

== Episodes ==
Season 1

- Extralarge: Black and White (1991)
- Extralarge: Miami Killer (1991)
- Extralarge: Moving Target (1992)
- Extralarge: Yo-Yo (1992)
- Extralarge: Cannonball (1992)
- Extralarge: Black Magic (1992)

Season 2

- Extralarge: Lord of the Sun (1993)
- Extralarge: Gonzales' Revenge (1993)
- Extralarge: Diamonds (1993)
- Extralarge: Ninja Shadow (1993)
- Extralarge: Condor Mission (1993)
- Extralarge: Indians (1993)

== Cast ==
Name	Actor	Note
Jack "ExtraLarge" Costello	Bud Spencer	ExtraLarge I and II
John Philip Dumas (Dumas)	Philip Michael Thomas	ExtraLarge I
Archibald Baxter (Dumas II)	Michael Winslow	ExtraLarge II
Inspector Sam	Lou Bedford	ExtraLarge I and II
Maria Martinez	Vivian Ruiz	ExtraLarge I and II

== See also ==
- List of Italian television series
