= Banana Joe (film) =

1982 film by Stefano Vanzina

- Theatrical release poster by Renato Casaro
- Directed by: Stefano Vanzina
- Written by: Mario Amendola; Bruno Corbucci; Stefano Vanzina
- Story by: Bud Spencer
- Produced by: Josi W. Konski; Karl Spiehs
- Starring: Bud Spencer
- Cinematography: Luigi Kuveiller
- Edited by: Raimondo Crociani
- Music by: Guido De Angelis; Maurizio De Angelis
- Release date: 1982
- Running time: 96 minutes
- Countries: Italy; West Germany
- Languages: Italian; English

Banana Joe is a 1982 Italian-German comedy film directed by Steno and starring Bud Spencer. Set in South America, the film was noted for its libertarian overtones and is remembered for Spencer's performance despite retrospective mixed appraisal.

== Plot ==
Banana Joe is a brawny yet friendly man who lives in a small rainforest village on the island of Amantido in South America. He is a father figure for the numerous local children and makes a living by regularly bartering bananas for goods needed by the Amantido community. One day, the henchmen of a local gangster boss named Torsillo come ashore in Amantido to take over the local production and exploit the indigenous population through the construction of a banana processing plant. Joe evicts the goons, who promptly return to their boss.

Torsillo finds out that Joe is trading bananas without a license and makes arrangement with the local police to have him arrested for that. Upon his next delivery, Joe is apprehended by the police and his boat is impounded until he can produce proper documents. Venturing into the city for help, Joe, who is entirely new to city life and only marginally literate, easily falls prey to a con man named Manuel, while also becoming infatuated with Dorianne, an attractive singer at a nightclub also owned by Torsillo.

Joe struggles with the bureaucracy and eventually enlists in the Army in order to reconstruct his paper trail with the government. After his sluggish attitude drives his drill sergeant to despair, Joe deserts and tries to just steal the desired trading license, which lands him in prison. Here, he re-encounters Manuel, and as Joe is about to exact vengeance upon him for scamming him, Manuel reveals that he has actually managed to get Joe the much-needed license. In the meantime, however, Torsillo has begun the construction of the banana plant in Amantido.

Joe and Manuel break out of prison and Joe proceeds to dispose of Torsillo's thugs and destroy their new developments. The police also arrive, but not to arrest Joe; they've been looking for Manuel, who has just received a presidential pardon in return for his helping the president to finally conceive a boy. Meanwhile, Torsillo is discovered to be a wanted criminal using a false name, and he and his associates are arrested. Dorianne decides to stay with Joe in Amantido, where she opens a school. Joe also attends it with the children, finally convinced of the need to be literate, and returns in other respects to his normal life.

== Cast ==
- Bud Spencer as Banana Joe
- Marina Langner as Dorianne
- Mario Scarpetta as Manuel
- Gianfranco Barra as Torsillo
- Enzo Garinei as Moreno
- Gunther Philipp as Sarto
- Giorgio Bracardi as Marquino
- Nello Pazzafini as Torsillo's truck driver
- Nazzareno Zamperla as Hitman (uncredited)

== Production ==
The script to this movie was written by Bud Spencer himself, under his civilian name Carlo Pedersoli. Parts of the movie were filmed in Cartagena, Colombia, and included extras from Cartagena.

== Home media ==
A DVD and Blu-ray version was released in 2013.

== Reception ==
A retrospective review described the film as a "libertarian epic". Another commentator found it brought "a light and cautious breeze of cheerful anarchism". Il Corriere della Sera lists it among Spencer's cult films, while La Repubblica called the theme song, "unforgettable".

FilmDienst was critical of the film, stating, "Bud Spencer film with fewer fights than usual, but also only a few funny ideas." El País called it "a mess with a tropical atmosphere (...), poorly directed by the Italian Steno".

== See also ==
- List of Italian films of 1982
