= Bomber (1982 film) =

1982 film by Michele Lupo

- Italian theatrical release poster by Renato Casaro
- Directed by: Michele Lupo
- Written by: Marcello Fondato, Francesco Scardamaglia
- Produced by: Elio Scardamaglia
- Starring: Bud Spencer, Jerry Calà
- Edited by: Eugenio Alabiso
- Music by: Guido & Maurizio De Angelis
- Distributed by: Cinema International Corporation
- Release date: 1982
- Running time: 99 minutes
- Country: Italy
- Language: Italian

Bomber is a 1982 comedy film directed by Michele Lupo, featuring Bud Spencer and Kallie Knoetze.

== Plot ==
Bud Graziano, the title's "Bomber" character, is a former heavyweight boxing champion who retired to private life on a ship. Jerry Calà, on the other hand, is a Lombard punter who always finds himself in trouble and one day gets into really big trouble. In fact, he unwittingly sets himself against a group of thugs who answer only to the orders of a new boxing champion who is making the rounds in the area with his victories. Bomber suddenly feels his passion for boxing reawakened, so he opens a gym for amateurs and begins to train the promising young George. Bomber organizes meetings in which fellow boxer Rosco also participates. Rosco, being too strong, knocks out the young George. After many other battles, Bomber is on the verge of losing everything he has slowly and painstakingly put together and thus decides to confront Rosco personally in a boxing contest.

== Cast ==
- Bud Spencer as Bud Graziano aka Bomber
- Jerry Calà as Jerry
- Stefano Mingardo as Giorgio Desideri aka Giorgione
- Kallie Knoetze as Rosco Dunn
- Gegia as Susanna
- Nando Paone as Ossario
- Valeria Cavalli as Giorgione's girlfriend
- Bobby Rhodes as Samuel Newman
- Rik Battaglia as American trainer
- Nello Pazzafini as cuddling guest in the restaurant
- Angela Campanella as Lauretta

== See also ==
- List of Italian films of 1982
