= They Called Him Bulldozer =

Lo chiamavano Bulldozer
- Italian theatrical release poster
- Directed by: Michele Lupo
- Written by: Marcello Fondato; Francesco Scardamaglia
- Produced by: Elio Scardamaglia
- Starring: Bud Spencer
- Cinematography: Franco Di Giacomo
- Edited by: Antonietta Zita
- Music by: Guido & Maurizio De Angelis
- Production companies: Leone Film; Rialto Film
- Distributed by: Cinema International Corporation (Italy); Tobis Film (West Germany)
- Release date: 1978
- Running time: 110 minutes
- Countries: Italy; West Germany
- Language: Italian

They Called Him Bulldozer (Italian: Lo chiamavano Bulldozer, German: Sie nannten ihn Mücke), also known as Uppercut and Bulldozer, is a 1978 Italian-West German action comedy film, directed by Michele Lupo and starring Bud Spencer.

== Plot ==
Bulldozer is a sailor and a retired American football superstar; landed by accident in the port of Livorno, he is involved in a sport challenge.

== Cast ==
- Bud Spencer as Bulldozer
- Raimund Harmstorf as Sergeant Robert Kempfer
- Ottaviano Dell'Acqua as Gerry
- Nando Paone as Ghigo
- Enzo Santaniello as Tojo
- Marco Stefanelli as Tony
- Giovanni Vettorazzo as Spitz
- René Kolldehoff as the Colonel
- Joe Bugner as Alberto 'Orso' Sarticoli
- Gigi Reder as Curatolo
- Riccardo Pizzuti as Simpson
- Luigi Bonos as the Mechanic
