= Bud Spencer =

Italian actor, professional swimmer and water polo player (1929–2016)

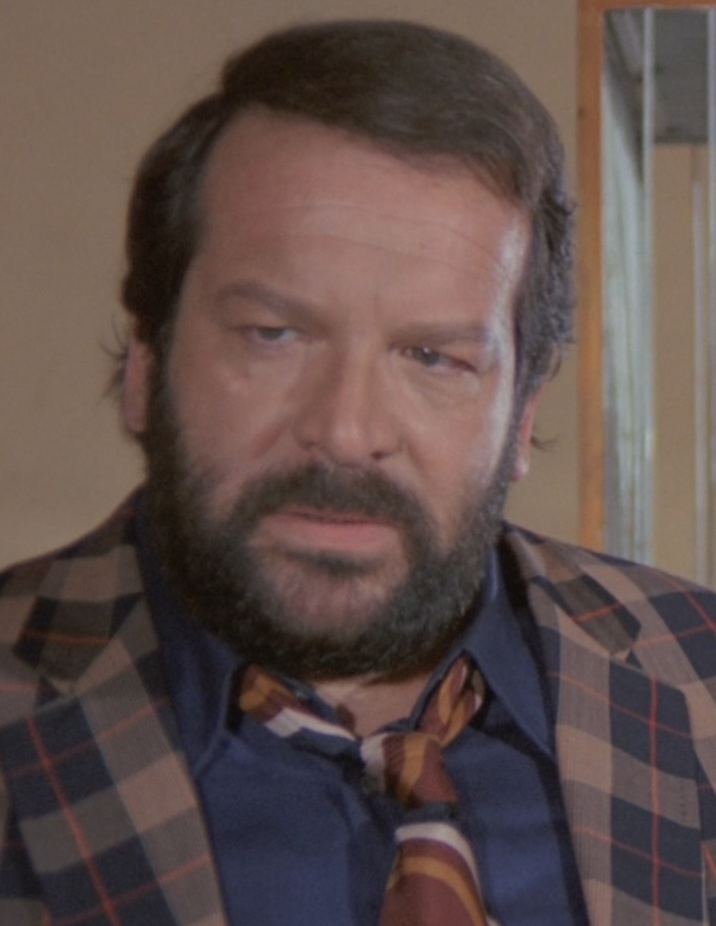
- Spencer in 1974
- Born: Carlo Pedersoli; 31 October 1929; Naples, Italy
- Died: 27 June 2016 (aged 86); Rome, Italy
- Resting place: Campo Verano, Rome, Italy
- Education: Sapienza University of Rome
- Occupations: Actor; professional swimmer; water polo player
- Years active: 1950–2010
- Spouse: Maria Amato (m. 1960)
- Children: 3
- Awards: David di Donatello Special Award
- Sports career
- National team: Italy
- Height: 192 cm (6 ft 3½ in)
- Sport: Swimming
- Strokes: Freestyle, water polo
- Club: Società Sportiva Lazio Nuoto
- Website: budspencerofficial.com

Bud Spencer (born Carlo Pedersoli; 31 October 1929 – 27 June 2016) was an Italian actor, professional swimmer and water polo player. He was known for action-comedy and spaghetti Western roles with his long-time film partner and friend Terence Hill. Spencer and Hill appeared in 18 films together.

In his youth, Bud Spencer was a successful athlete and swimmer for Gruppo Sportivo Fiamme Oro and for Società Sportiva Lazio Nuoto. He represented Italy twice at the Summer Olympics. He obtained a law degree and registered several patents. Spencer also became a certified commercial airline and helicopter pilot, and supported and funded many children's charities, including the Spencer Scholarship Fund.

== Early life ==
Son of Alessandro Pedersoli and Rosa Facchetti, respectively from Darfo Boario Terme and Chiari (both in the province of Brescia, Lombardy), Carlo Pedersoli was born on 31 October 1929 in Santa Lucia, a historical rione in Naples, in the same building as the writer Luciano De Crescenzo. He played several sports and showed an aptitude for swimming, winning prizes. De Crescenzo was a classmate of his. In 1940, due to his father's work, he moved to Rome, where he attended high school and joined a swimming club. He finished school before his seventeenth birthday with the highest marks and enrolled at Sapienza University of Rome, where he studied chemistry. In 1947, the family moved to South America and Pedersoli discontinued his studies. From 1947 to 1949, he worked in the Italian consulate in Recife, Brazil, where he learned to speak fluent Portuguese.

== Swimming and water polo career ==
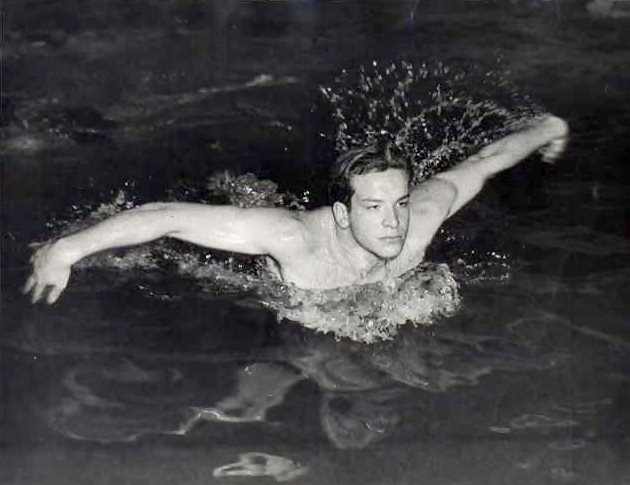
Spencer in 1950

Pedersoli returned to Italy in 1949, and played water polo in Rome for Società Sportiva Lazio Nuoto and won the Italian swimming championships in freestyle and mixed relay teams. As a professional swimmer in his youth, Spencer was the first Italian to swim the 100 m freestyle in less than one minute when, on 19 September 1950, he swam the distance in 59.5 s in Salsomaggiore. In 1949, he made his international debut and a year later, he was called up for the European championships in Vienna, where he swam in two finals, finishing fifth in the 100 m and fourth in the relay 4×200 m.

In the 1951 Mediterranean Games in Alexandria (Egypt), he won a silver medal in the same 100 m freestyle event.

Pedersoli participated in the 1952 Summer Olympics in Helsinki, Finland, reaching the semi-finals in the 100 m freestyle (58.8 s heats, 58.9 s semi-final). Four years later, at the 1956 Summer Olympics in Melbourne, Australia, he again reached the semi-finals in the same category (58.5 s heat, 59.0 s semi final).

As a water polo player, he won the Italian Championship in 1954 with S.S. Lazio and the gold medal at 1955 Mediterranean Games in Barcelona with the Italian national team. His swimming career ended abruptly in 1957.

On 17 January 2005, he was awarded the Caimano d'oro (Gold Caiman) by the Italian Swimming Federation. On 24 January 2007, he received swimming and water polo coach diplomas from the Italian Swimming Federation's president Paolo Barelli.

== Acting career ==
Pedersoli's first film role was in Quel fantasma di mio marito, an Italian comedy short released in 1950. In 1951, he played a member of the Praetorian Guard in Quo Vadis, an epic film shot in Italy made by MGM and directed by Mervyn LeRoy. During the 1950s and early 1960s, Spencer appeared playing minor parts in Italian including Mario Monicelli's movie A Hero of Our Times, with Alberto Sordi and the 1954 war film Human Torpedoes with Raf Vallone.

In 1960, after the Summer Olympic games, Pedersoli married Maria Amato, daughter of Italian film producer Giuseppe Amato. He signed a contract with RCA Records to write lyrics for singers such as Ornella Vanoni and Nico Fidenco and soundtracks. In the following years, his son Giuseppe was born (1961), followed by Cristiana (1962), his contract with RCA expired and his father-in-law died (1964). Pedersoli became a producer of documentaries for the national public broadcasting company RAI.

=== Partnership with Terence Hill ===
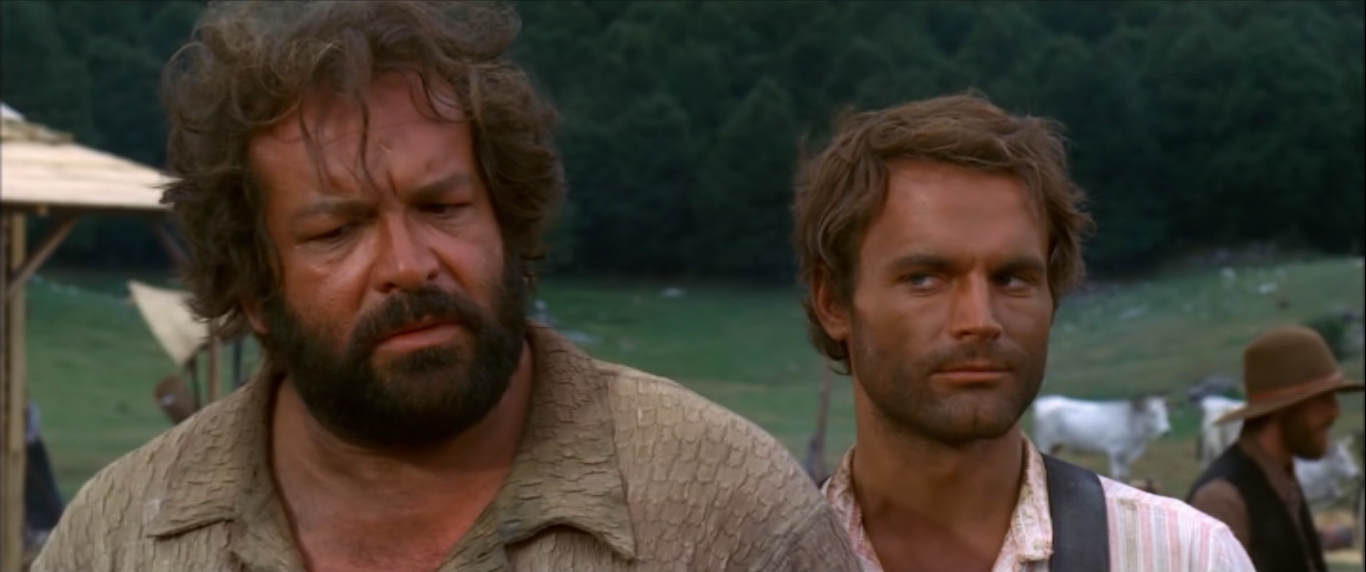
Spencer (left) and Terence Hill in They Call Me Trinity by Enzo Barboni (1970)

In 1967, film director Giuseppe Colizzi offered him a role in God Forgives... I Don't!. On the set, Pedersoli met Mario Girotti (Terence Hill). (Although Pedersoli appeared in the same movie as Girotti in Hannibal in 1959, they did not meet during filming). The film director asked the two actors to change their names, deeming them to be too Italian-sounding for a Western movie: Pedersoli chose Bud Spencer, with Bud inspired by Budweiser beer and Spencer by the actor Spencer Tracy. They went on to become a film duo.

While Hill's characters were agile and youthful, Spencer always played the "phlegmatic, grumpy strong-arm man with a blessed, naive child's laughter and a golden heart". Overall, Hill and Spencer worked together on 18 films, including (using their most common U.S. titles) the spaghetti Westerns They Call Me Trinity (1970) and its sequel, Trinity Is Still My Name (1971). Their last teaming, Troublemakers (1994), was also in this genre.

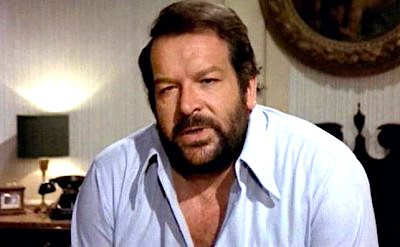
Spencer in Flatfoot (1973)

Many of these have alternative titles, depending on the country and distributor. Some have longer Italian versions that were edited for their release abroad. These films gathered popularity for both actors, especially throughout much of Europe and parts of Asia and South America. Because of the duo's huge popularity, many producers wanted to exploit their likeness with visually similar duos. Most notable were Paul L. Smith (adopted name Adam Eden in later years, sometimes credited Anam Eden) and Michael Coby (real name Antonio Cantafora) with at least 6 movies in Bud & Terence-fashion from 1973 to 1977, and István Bujtor with 6 movies in Piedone-fashion from 1981 to 2008.

In the Italian versions of his films, Spencer was generally dubbed by actor Glauco Onorato due to his thick Naples accent, although he was voiced by Sergio Fiorentini in Troublemakers, To the Limit (1997) and the Extralarge series (1991–93). For English dubs, Spencer was usually voiced by Robert Sommer, Edward Mannix or Richard McNamara, although he occasionally provided his own voice.

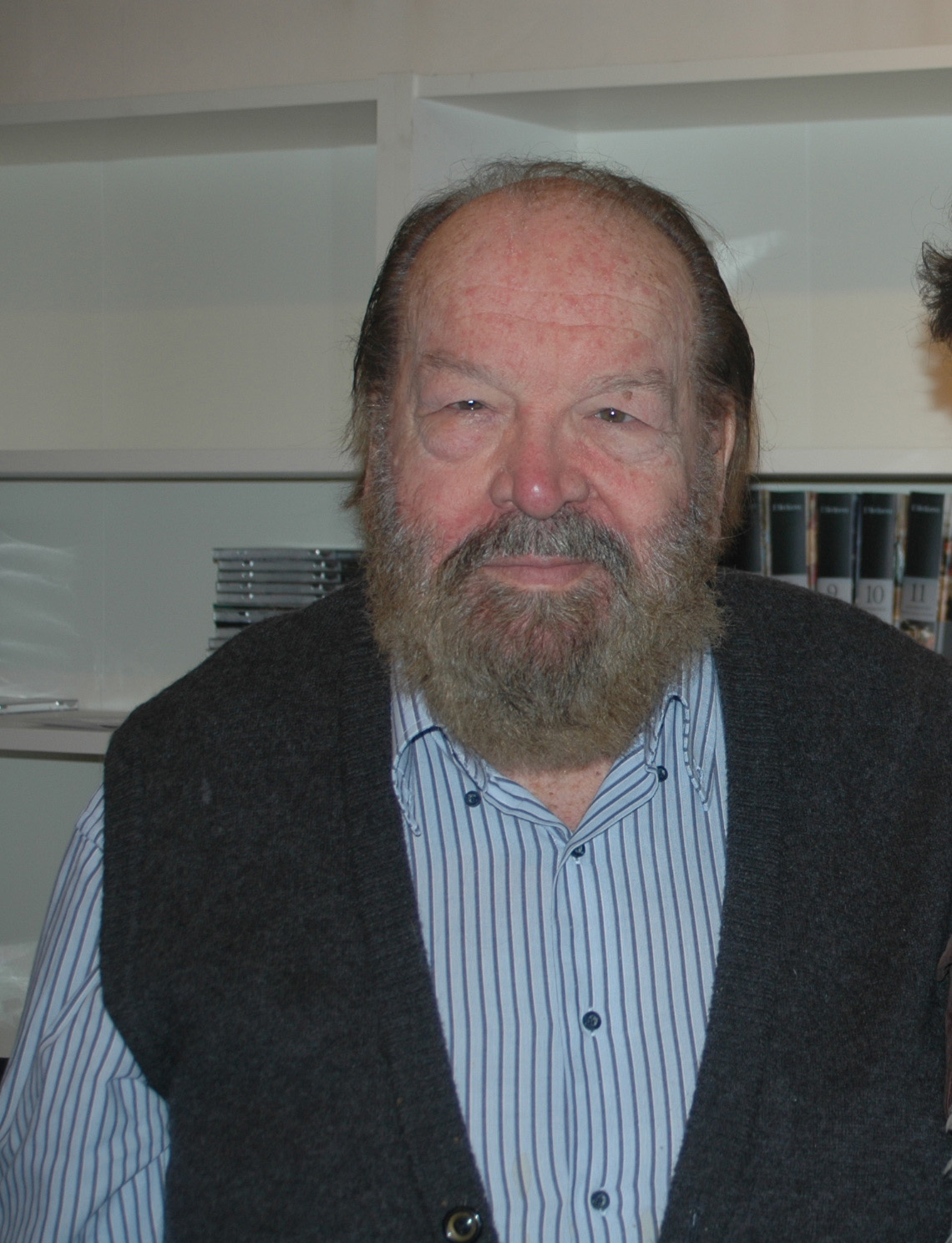
Spencer in 2009

Spencer wrote the complete or partial screenplay for some of his movies. His feature film career slowed down after 1983, shifting more toward television. In the 1990s, he acted in the television action-drama Extralarge. His autobiography was published in 2011. In addition, Spencer also published a recipe book including his favorite dishes.

== Political career ==
In 2005, he entered politics, unsuccessfully standing as regional councilor in Lazio for the Forza Italia party. Spencer stated: "In my life, I've done everything. There are only three things I haven't been – a ballet dancer, a jockey and a politician. Given that the first two jobs are out of the question, I'll throw myself into politics." The opposition criticized him for engaging in politica spettacolo ("showbiz politics").

== Personal life ==
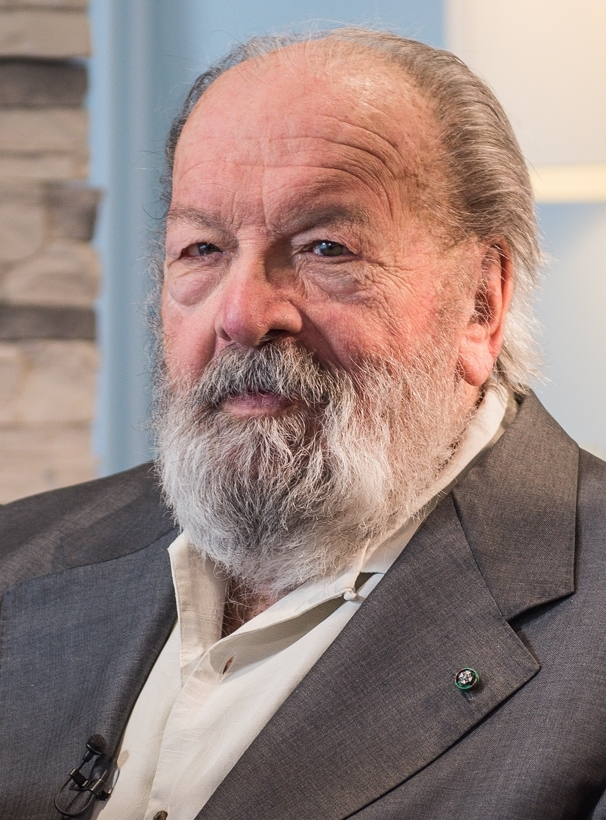
Bud Spencer in 2015

Spencer married Maria Amato in 1960, with whom he had three children: Giuseppe (1961), Cristiana (1962) and Diamante (1972). After appearing in Più forte, ragazzi!, Spencer became a jet airplane and helicopter pilot. He founded Mistral Air in 1984, an air-mail company that also transports pilgrims, but later sold it to Poste Italiane. Spencer's grandson, Carlo Pedersoli Jr., is a mixed martial arts fighter currently signed to the Ultimate Fighting Championship.

=== Death ===
Spencer died aged 86 on 27 June 2016 in Rome. Spencer's son Giuseppe Pedersoli stated that his father "died without pain in presence of his family, and his last word was 'grazie'". He was buried at the Campo Verano cemetery in Rome.

Bud Spencer Festival 2016 in Germany main event was changed from exhibition of 15 years’ anniversary of the festival to fans’ organized exhibition about his life.

=== Legacy ===
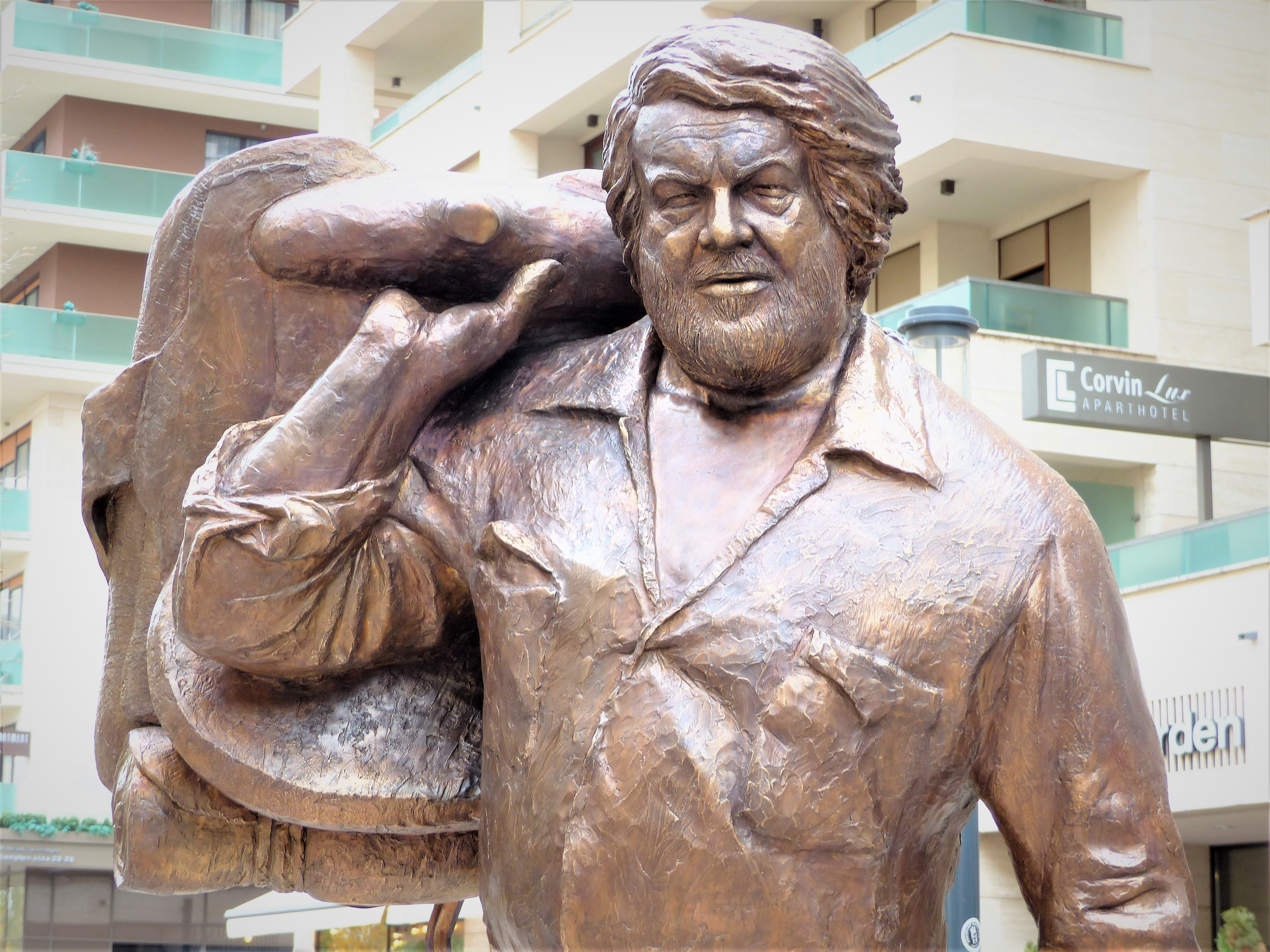
Bud Spencer's memorial statue in downtown Budapest

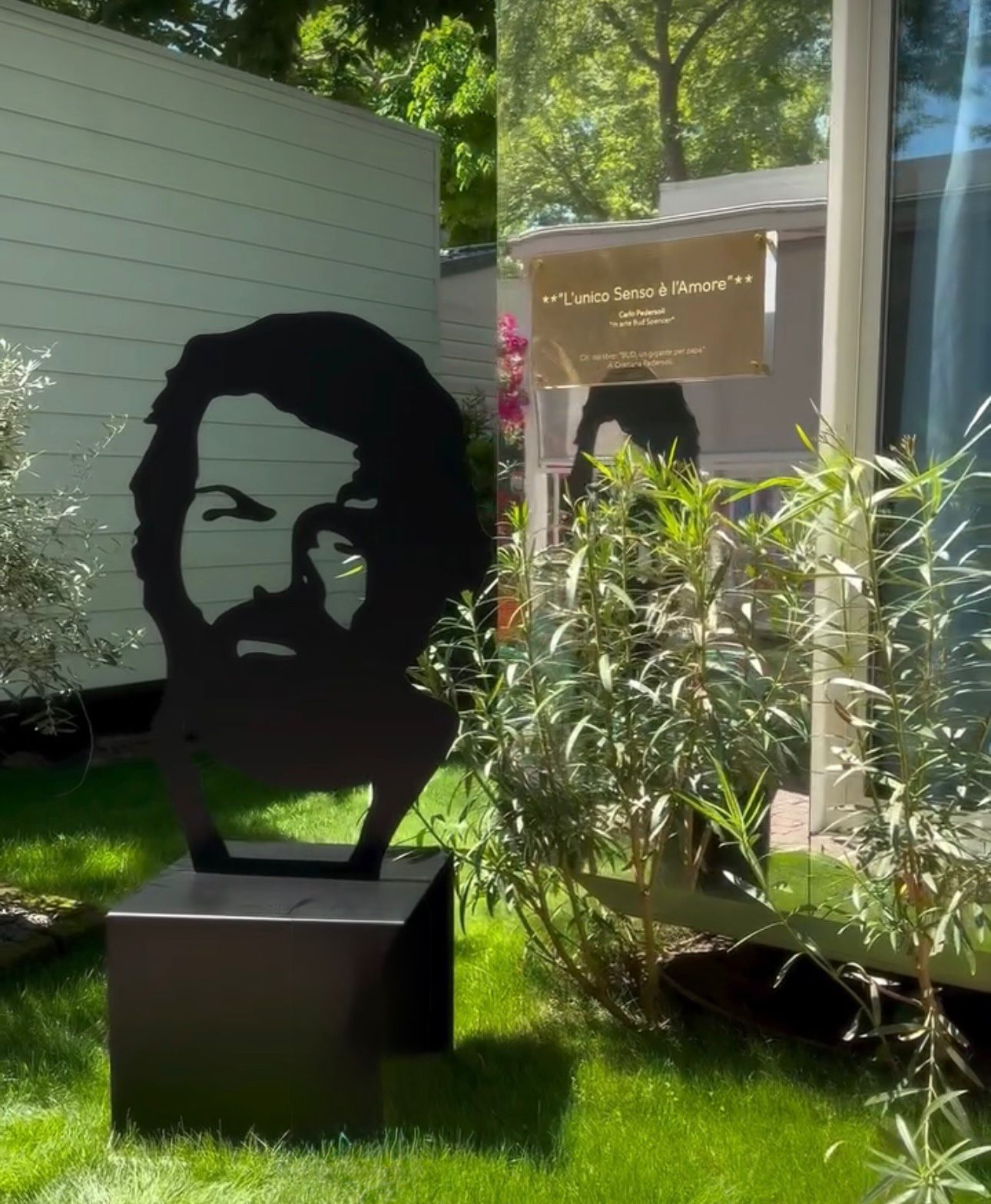
Scultura XXL di Bud Spencer (2025) at Cavallino-Treporti, work of Cristiana Pedersoli, near Luxury Camp at Union Lido.

Spencer posthumously received the America Award in 2018 from the Italy–USA Foundation.

In Hungary, where his films were hugely popular during the communist regime, a larger-than-life-sized bronze statue of Spencer created by sculptor Szandra Tasnádi was unveiled on 11 November 2017 in Budapest, with Spencer's daughters in attendance. The statue's pedestal bears the inscription Mi sohasem veszekedtünk ("We never argued"), a quote from Terence Hill's eulogy referring to their long-lasting friend- and partnership.

Statue of Bud Spencer on the quay at Livorno from 2019.

A beat 'em up video game titled Bud Spencer & Terence Hill: Slaps and Beans, closely based on Spencer and Hill's cinematic work, was developed by the Italian firm Trinity Team srls and first published by the German firm Buddy Productions GmbH in 2018.

In 2021, the Bud Spencer Museum opened in Berlin.

In Schwäbisch Gmünd, the open-air bath was renamed to "Bud Spencer Bad" (popular abbreviation "Bud Bad") in 2011, in the presence of Bud Spencer, to honour his participation in an international swimming contest in 1951 in the same bath, where as at that time a world class swimmer won the competition in 100m freestyle, with 59,8 seconds the only one on 100m at that competition with time under one minute.

There is a traditional Bud Spencer and Terence Hill Festival in Germany (from 2001), in Italy (from 2005) and in Hungary (from 2007).

== Filmography ==
=== Film ===
Year	Title	Role	Notes
1950	Quel fantasma di mio marito	Swimmer	Uncredited
1951	Quo Vadis	Imperial Guard	Uncredited
1954	Siluri umani	Magrini	English title: Human Torpedoes
1955	Un Eroe dei nostri tempi	Fernando	English title: A Hero of Our Times
1957	Il Cocco di Mamma	Oscar	English title: Mamma's Boy
1957	A Farewell to Arms	Carabiniere	Uncredited
1959	Annibale	Rutario	English title: Hannibal
1967	Dio perdona... io no!	Hutch Bessy	English title: God Forgives... I Don't!
1968	Oggi a me... domani a te	O'Bannion	English title: Today We Kill, Tomorrow We Die
1968	Al di là della legge	James Cooper	English title: Beyond the Law
1968	I quattro dell'Ave Maria	Hutch Bessy	English title: Ace High
1969	Un esercito di 5 uomini	Mesito	English title: The Five Man Army
1969	La collina degli stivali	Hutch Bessy	English title: Boot Hill
1970	Gott mit uns (Dio è con noi)	Cpl. Jelinek	English title: The Fifth Day of Peace
1970	Lo chiamavano Trinità...	Bambino	English title: They Call Me Trinity
1971	Il corsaro nero	Skull	English title: Blackie the Pirate
1971	...continuavano a chiamarlo Trinità	Bambino	English title: Trinity Is Still My Name
1971	4 mosche di velluto grigio	Godfrey "God"	English title: Four Flies on Grey Velvet
1972	Si può fare... amigo	Hiram Coburn	English title: It Can Be Done Amigo
1972	Torino nera	Rosario Rao	English title: Black Turin
1972	...più forte ragazzi!	Salud	English title: All the Way Boys
1972	Una ragione per vivere e una per morire	Eli Sampson	English title: A Reason to Live, a Reason to Die
1973	Anche gli angeli mangiano fagioli	Charlie Smith	English title: Even Angels Eat Beans
1973	Piedone lo sbirro	Inspector "Flatfoot" Rizzo	English title: Flatfoot
1974	...altrimenti ci arrabbiamo!	Ben	English title: Watch Out, We're Mad
1974	Porgi l'altra guancia	Father / Padre Pedro	English title: Two Missionaries
1975	Piedone a Hong Kong	Inspector "Flatfoot" Rizzo	English title: Flatfoot in Hong Kong
1976	Il soldato di ventura	Hector Fieramosca	English title: Soldier of Fortune
1977	Charleston	Charleston	
1977	I due superpiedi quasi piatti	Wilbur Walsh	English title: Crime Busters
1978	Piedone l'africano	Inspector "Flatfoot" Rizzo	English title: Flatfoot in Africa aka The Knock-Out Cop
1978	Lo chiamavano Bulldozer	Bulldozer	English title: They Called Him Bulldozer
1978	Pari e dispari	Charlie Firpo	English title: Odds and Evens
1979	Uno sceriffo extraterrestre... poco extra e molto terrestre	Sceriffo Scott (Sheriff Hall)	English title: The Sheriff and the Satellite Kid
1979	Io sto con gli ippopotami	Tom	English title: I'm for the Hippopotamus
1980	Piedone d'Egitto	Inspector 'Flatfoot' Rizzo	English title: Flatfoot in Egypt
1980	Chissà perché... capitano tutte a me	Sheriff Hall	English title: Everything Happens to Me
1981	Occhio alla penna	Buddy	English title: Buddy Goes West
1981	Chi trova un amico trova un tesoro	Charlie O'Brien	English title: Who Finds a Friend Finds a Treasure
1982	Banana Joe	Banana Joe	Also writer
1982	Bomber	Bud Graziano	
1983	Cane e gatto	Lt. Alan Parker	English title: Cat and Dog
1983	Nati con la camicia	Doug O'Riordan alias Mason	English title: Go for It
1984	Non c'è due senza quattro	Greg Wonder / Antonio Coimbra de la Coronilla y Azevedo	English title: Double Trouble
1985	Miami Supercops (I poliziotti dell'8ª strada)	Steve Forest	English title: Miami Supercops
1986	Superfantagenio	Genie	English title: Aladdin
1991	Un piede in paradiso	John "Bull" Webster	English title: Standing in Paradise aka Speaking of the Devil
1994	Botte di Natale	Moses	English title: The Fight Before Christmas aka Troublemakers
1997	Fuochi d'artificio	The blind singer	English title: Fireworks
1997	Al limite	Elorza	English title: To the Limit
1998	Tre per sempre	Bops	English title: 3–4 Ever
2000	Hijos del viento	Quintero	English title: Sons of the Wind
2003	Cantando dietro i paraventi	Il vecchio capitano	English title: Singing Behind Screens
2009	Mord ist mein Geschäft, Liebling	Pepe	English title: Murder Is My Business, Honey

=== Television ===
Year	Title	Role	Notes
1988–1989	Big Man	Jack Clementi	6 episodes
1990–1993	Detective Extralarge	Jack "Extralarge" Costello	12 episodes
1997	Noi siamo angeli	Orso	6 episodes
2005	Father Hope	Padre Speranza / Father Hope	Television film
2008	Pane e Olio	Laris	Television short
2010	I delitti del cuoco	Carlo Banci	10 episodes

=== Video games ===
Year	Title	Role	Notes
1997	We Are Angels	Padre Orso	
2017	Slaps and Beans	Bud Spencer	With Terence Hill; for PS4, Nintendo Switch, Xbox Series X/S, Xbox One and PC
2023	Slaps and Beans 2	Bud Spencer	With Terence Hill; for PS4, PS5, Nintendo Switch, Xbox Series X/S, Xbox One and PC

== Additional sources ==
- Cristiana, Pedersoli (June 2020). BUD Un gigante per papà Le avventure, l'amore, le passioni di una vita smisurata [BUD - The Giant for Dad - Adventures, love, and passions of a boundless life] (in Italian) (June 2023 ed.). www.giunti.it.
