= The Sheriff and the Satellite Kid =

The Sheriff and the Satellite Kid (Uno sceriffo extraterrestre... poco extra e molto terrestre)
- Italian theatrical release poster by Renato Casaro
- Directed by: Michele Lupo
- Written by: Marcello Fondato; Francesco Scardamaglia
- Produced by: Elio Scardamaglia; Francesco Scardamaglia; Marcello Fondato
- Starring: Bud Spencer; Cary Guffey; Raimund Harmstorf; Joe Bugner
- Cinematography: Franco Di Giacomo
- Release date: 1979
- Running time: 95 minutes
- Country: Italy
- Languages: Italian; English

The Sheriff and the Satellite Kid (Italian: Uno sceriffo extraterrestre... poco extra e molto terrestre, lit. 'An Extraterrestrial Sheriff... Little Extra and Very Terrestrial') is a 1979 Italian children's comedy film starring Bud Spencer and child actor Cary Guffey. It was followed by a sequel in 1980, Everything Happens to Me. The film's theme song "Sheriff", was written and performed like the rest of the soundtrack, by Guido & Maurizio De Angelis (then known as Oliver Onions), was a local airplay hit in the same year.

== Plot ==
One morning, the little town of Newnan, Georgia, is thrown into hysteria when a UFO is reported over the nearby lake; even the personnel from the nearby Air Force base is mobilized. The only one remaining untouched by this hubbub is Sheriff Hall (Spencer), the big and punchy keeper of the local law; indeed, he does not believe in aliens, especially since layabouts like Brennan (Joe Bugner) use the excitement to commit all sorts of mischief. Still, strange things begin to happen to some of the citizens who share his point of view: a barber's chair begins to spin rapidly around its axis – along with its customer – and an ice cream cart suddenly disgorges its entire load (and more) onto the street after the vendor makes a joke about the aliens being hungry for his ice cream.

The same night, a blackout hits the city. Hall goes on patrol when his rheumatic deputy Allen (Luigi Bonos) calls him to retrieve a runaway boy. Arriving at the boy's favorite place, the local amusement park, Hall finds not one but two boys; one of them – wearing a silver spacesuit – turns out to be the runaway, the other (an apparent seven-year-old; Cary Guffey) perpetually introduces himself as H7-25, comes up with space-related terms like lightyears and spaceship, brandishes a strange device which makes all things around him go haywire, and even enables Brennan (who has been taken into custody) to escape on two occasions and Allen to temporarily overcome his rheumatism. Still, the sheriff is not convinced – not until the boy irradiates him with what he calls "bio-magnetic energy", enabling him to make a large trout leap into his hands and a horse talk in English.

Meanwhile, however, an ambitious Air Force Captain named Briggs (Raimund Harmstorf) sees his chance with the UFO sighting and the evidence of an alien landing (which is, of course, H7-25's doing and caused the aforementioned blackout) to further his own career. Working without the knowledge of his highly sceptical general, Briggs tracks down the boy, but his first attempts to take him are foiled by the sheriff's hard-hitting fists and H7-25's technical wizard device, as well as Brennan's assistance.

Finally, while Hall and H7-25 camp out at Stone Mountain to await the arrival of the boy's pick-up, Briggs and his men manage to kidnap the boy and bring him to the base. The sheriff, however, infiltrates the facility and gets the boy out. In a mass showdown at the local fire brigade hall, where a party was to be held, Briggs and his men get their share from the Sheriff Hall, the little alien and their friends. Later that night, a spaceship comes to pick up H7-25, and he and Hall part ways. But as Hall returns home, he suddenly finds H7-25 sitting in the back of his car – he has managed to get an additional period of leave on Earth to spend with his big friend.

== Cast ==
- Bud Spencer as Sheriff Scott Hall
- Cary Guffey as H7-25
- Raimund Harmstorf as Captain Briggs
- Joe Bugner as Brennan
- Luigi Bonos as Deputy Allen

== Production ==
The filming of the scene where the Sheriff and H7-25 first meet was filmed at Six Flags Over Georgia; that location was later reused for the film's sequel, Everything Happens to Me. Filming took place in Newnan, GA. a small town south of Atlanta. Additional locations include Dobbins Air Force Base in Marietta, and Stone Mountain.
