= Sergio Graziani =

Italian voice actor (1930–2018)

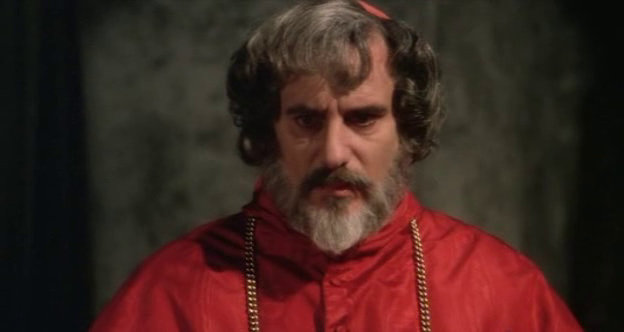
- Graziani in Goodnight, Ladies and Gentlemen (1974)
- Born: 10 November 1930; Udine, Italy
- Died: 25 May 2018 (aged 87); Rome, Italy
- Occupations: Actor; voice actor; dubbing director
- Years active: 1956–2014
- Children: 1

Sergio Graziani (10 November 1930 – 25 May 2018) was an Italian actor and voice actor.

== Biography ==
Born in Udine, Graziani attended the Silvio d'Amico National Academy of Dramatic Arts, and began his career on stage in the late 1950s, working as a screen and voice actor as well. Through the years, Graziani dubbed Donald Sutherland and Peter O'Toole in Italian in most of their performances.

In 1999, he dubbed the animated character Professor Farnsworth from Futurama for the first five seasons of the show, until he was replaced by Mino Caprio in the second run of the show.

=== Personal life ===
Graziani has one daughter, Tiziana, who is married to the voice actor Fabrizio Vidale.

== Retirement and death ==
Graziani officially retired from his career in 2014 and he died in Rome on 25 May 2018, at the age of 87.

== Filmography ==
=== Cinema ===
- Il vedovo (1959) - (voice, uncredited)
- Le sette vipere (Il marito latino) (1964) - (voice, uncredited)
- The Birds, the Bees and the Italians (1966) - (voice, uncredited)
- A Complicated Girl (1969) - Greta's boyfriend
- The Divorce (1970) - (voice, uncredited)
- Long Live Robin Hood (1971) - (voice, uncredited)
- The Case Is Closed, Forget It (1971) - (voice, uncredited)
- The Assassin of Rome (1972) - (voice, uncredited)
- My Pleasure Is Your Pleasure (1973) - Francis I of France (uncredited)
- The Five Days (1973) - Baron Tranzunto
- Libera, My Love (1975) - Franco Testa (voice, uncredited)
- Goodnight, Ladies and Gentlemen (1976) - Cardinal Cannaregio (uncredited)
- Porca vacca (1982) - Tomo Secondo (voice)
- Piccolo grande amore (1993)
- The Butterfly's Dream (1994) - L'ortolano
- It Can't Be All Our Fault (2003) - Camillo Tinacci
- Secret File (2003) - Professore
- Segretario particolare (2007) - Davide
- Tutta colpa della musica (2011) - Zaccaria
- The Unlikely Prince (2013) - old Count (final film role)

== Dubbing roles ==
=== Animation ===
- Professor Farnsworth in Futurama (seasons 1–5), Futurama: Bender's Big Score, Futurama: The Beast With a Billion Backs, Futurama: Bender's Game, Futurama: Into the Wild Green Yonder
- Meowrice in Gay Purr-ee
- Stan's grandfather in South Park
- Dr. Vosknocker in South Park: Bigger, Longer & Uncut
- Mr. Bloomsberry in Curious George

=== Live action ===
- Agar in The First Great Train Robbery
- Hawkeye Pierce in MASH
- Matthew Bennell in Invasion of the Body Snatchers
- Lucien Wilbanks in A Time to Kill
- X in JFK
- Flan Kittredge in Six Degrees of Separation
- Lieutenant Stanton in Fallen
- Sergeant "Oddball" in Kelly's Heroes
- John Klute in Klute
- Bruland in S*P*Y*S
- Donald McClintock in Outbreak
- Ben Hillard in Instinct
- Robert Everton in Virus
- Jack Shaw in The Assignment
- Rosario Sarracino in Five Moons Square
- Hellfrick in Ask the Dust
- Gonville Bromhead in Zulu
- Captain Douglas in Play Dirty
- The Captain in The Last Valley
- John Deray in The Marseille Contract
- Jim Keogh in The Wilby Conspiracy
- Frank Bryant in Educating Rita
- Noel Holcroft in The Holcroft Covenant
- Sam Bulbeck in Half Moon Street
- Hoagie Newcombe in Jaws: The Revenge
- Lawrence Jamieson in Dirty Rotten Scoundrels
- Nigel Bigelow in Bewitched
- Jack Geller in Friends
- T. E. Lawrence in Lawrence of Arabia
- King Henry II in Becket
- Lord Jim in Lord Jim
- Michael James in What's New Pussycat?
- King Henry II in The Lion in Winter
- Simon Dermott in How to Steal a Million
- Jack Gurney in The Ruling Class
- Viscount Chelmsford in Zulu Dawn
- Timothy Flyte in Phantoms
- Priam in Troy
- Maurice Russell in Venus
- King of Stormhold in Stardust
- Karl-Heinz Zimmer in That Most Important Thing: Love
- Doc Foster in A Genius, Two Partners and a Dupe
- Count Dracula in Nosferatu the Vampyre
- Friedrich Johann Franz Woyzeck in Woyzeck
- El Santo in A Bullet for the General
- Brent in The Ruthless Four
- Gary Hamilton in And God Said to Cain
- Quintero in Gangster's Law
- James Webb in Black Killer
- Edgar Allan Poe in Web of the Spider
- Adam in The Cats
- Judge Rousseau in The Judge and the Assassin
- Philippe in La Grande Bouffe
- General Terry in Don't Touch the White Woman!
- Philippe d'Orléans in On Guard
- Knut Straud in The Heroes of Telemark
- Dr. Jonathan Chamberlain in The Cassandra Crossing
- Captain Nolan in Orca
- Paddy O'Neil in Patriot Games
- Benjamin Tyreen in Major Dundee
- Rafer Janders in The Wild Geese
- Bill Parker in Mulholland Falls
- Charlie in Down in the Valley
- Woody Grant in Nebraska
- Hercule Poirot in Appointment with Death
- Gus Nikolais in Lorenzo's Oil
- Frederick III in Luther
- Walter Harper in Topkapi
- Cardinal Alba in Vampires
- Arkady Shapira in Little Odessa
- Julius Edmund Santorin in A Little Romance
- Dr. Jan Spaander in A Bridge Too Far
- Spock Prime in Star Trek, Star Trek Into Darkness
- Philip Marlowe in Farewell, My Lovely
- Lieutenant Elgart in Cape Fear
- Kurt Dussander in Apt Pupil
- James Whale in Gods and Monsters
- Peck in Night and the City
- Sheldon Dodge in Two Much
- Abraham Whistler in Blade II, Blade: Trinity
- Caesar in Gattaca
- Ted Denslow in BASEketball
- S.R. Hadden in Contact
- Benjamin Devereaux in The Skeleton Key
- Lasker-Jones in Maurice
- Fagin in Oliver Twist
- John Clayton's grandfather in Greystoke: The Legend of Tarzan, Lord of the Apes
- Sir Charles Litton in The Return of the Pink Panther
- Mathieu in That Obscure Object of Desire
- Ace Hanlon in The Quick and the Dead
- Pyotr Ilyich Tchaikovsky in The Music Lovers
- Toot-Toot in The Green Mile
- Major Harriman in They Call Me Trinity
- Laurent Ségur in The Christmas Tree
- Tommy Haskins in The Anderson Tapes
- Matthew Scudder in 8 Million Ways to Die
- Bill Dolworth in The Professionals
- John McGregor in Phenomena
- Phil Benton in Madame X
- Henry L. Stimson in Tora! Tora! Tora!
- George Armstrong Custer in Little Big Man
- Malvolio in Twelfth Night
- Guy Montag in Fahrenheit 451
- Marshal Sam MacKenna in Mackenna's Gold
- Chief Judge Fargo in Judge Dredd
- Bobby Bartellemeo in The Crew
- Franco "Cookie" Arnò in The Cat o' Nine Tails
- Montero in Bad Man's River
- Three-fingered Jack in The Mask of Zorro
- Gerald Crich in Women in Love
- Mr. Vogler in Persona
- Mike in Red Line 7000
- Mary Ann in Prime Cut
- Graham Keightley in The Paper
- Jack Woltz in The Godfather
- Mark Van Doren in Quiz Show
- Jonathan Kent in Superman
- John N. Mitchell in Nixon
- Harry Greenberg in Bugsy
- Lord Lendale in Lady L
- Dr. Vijav Alezais in Wolf

=== Video games ===
- Professor Farnsworth in Futurama
