= How to Kill a Judge =

1974 film by Damiano Damiani

- Italian film poster
- Directed by: Damiano Damiani
- Screenplay by: Damiano Damiani; Fulvio Gicca Palli; Enrico Ribulsi
- Story by: Damiano Damiani
- Produced by: Mario Cecchi Gori
- Starring: Franco Nero; Françoise Fabian
- Cinematography: Mario Vulpiani
- Edited by: Antonio Siciliano
- Music by: Riz Ortolani
- Production companies: Rizzoli Film; Capital Film
- Distributed by: Cineriz
- Release date: 1974
- Running time: 111 minutes
- Country: Italy
- Language: Italian

How to Kill a Judge (Italian: Perché si uccide un magistrato), also known as The Murder of a Magistrate and Why Does One Kill a Magistrate?, is a 1974 Italian crime-thriller film directed by Damiano Damiani. It is the final chapter in the Damiani's trilogy about mafia, after The Day of the Owl and Confessions of a Police Captain.

It was released on DVD by Blue Underground in March 2006.

== Plot ==
Giacomo Solaris is a film-maker whose latest released feature film is a crime thriller about a judge who gets too friendly with the Mafia and is murdered. A resentful Sicilian magistrate orders the film seized, but then the judge winds up dead, in a fashion just like that in Solaris's movie. Solaris realizes that corrupt political forces are pulling strings and attempting to cover up murders of his friends who begin to die in grisly ways. Will he learn the truth about the murder of the judge in time?

== Cast ==
The film was dubbed into English with voice actors based within Italy, with Franco being the sole actor to reprise his role and dub himself over in English.

Character	Original actor	English voice actor
Giacomo Solaris	Franco Nero	Franco Nero
Giudice De Tonarre	Pierluigi Aprà	Frank von Kuegelgen
Sen. Derrasi	Giancarlo Badessi	Gene Luotto
Lawyer Meloria	Luciano Catenacci	Michael Forest
Dr. Valgardeni	Giorgio Cerioni	Edmund Purdom
Sicilia Notte Editor	Mico Cundari	Gene Luotto
Attorney Alberto Traini-Luis	Marco Guglielmi	Anthony La Penna
Toruzzo	Salvatore Moscardini	Nick Alexander
Vincenzo Terrasini	Renzo Palmer	Robert Sommer
Ugo Selimi	Elio Zamuto	Ted Rusoff
Commissioner Zamagna	Gianni Zavota	Edward Mannix
Carmelo Bellolampo	Vincenzo Norvese	Gene Luotto
Vezzi	Elio Di Vincenzo	Gene Luotto

=== Additional English Dub Voices ===
- Cicely Browne
- Lewis E. Ciannelli
- Mickey Knox
- Gene Luotto
- Robert Spafford

== See also ==
- List of Italian films of 1974
