= Goodbye & Amen =

- Directed by: Damiano Damiani
- Written by: Nicola Badalucco; Damiano Damiani
- Based on: The Grosvenor Square Goodbye by Francis Clifford
- Produced by: Mario Cecchi Gori
- Starring: Tony Musante; Claudia Cardinale; John Steiner; John Forsythe
- Cinematography: Luigi Kuveiller
- Edited by: Antonio Siciliano
- Music by: Guido De Angelis; Maurizio De Angelis
- Production company: Capital Film
- Distributed by: Cineriz (Italy)
- Release date: 23 December 1977 (Italy)
- Country: Italy
- Language: English

Goodbye & Amen is a 1977 Italian political thriller film co-written and directed by Damiano Damiani, and starring Tony Musante, Claudia Cardinale, John Steiner and John Forsythe. It is based on the 1974 novel The Grosvenor Square Goodbye by British author Francis Clifford.

== Plot ==
John Dannahay is a CIA agent operating from the United States Embassy in Rome planning a coup of an African country. He finds out an old colleague of his, Harry Lambert, is in contact with one of the subjects of his operation, and may be a double agent. He tries to get in contact with Lambert but finds from his wife Renata that he has just left. Later, someone enters the Lambert's house and takes a rifle.

At a Hilton hotel, a man sets up the rifle and shoots someone. As a hubbub develops, he shoots a man taking a photograph of the situation. As the police show up, he forces his way into one of the hotel rooms and takes a couple, Aliki and Jack, hostage.

Renata assumes that Lambert himself took his gun, and Dannahay also surmises this. Dannahay wants to contact Lambert, so he heads to the Hilton where Police Inspector Moreno is attempting to handle the situation.

The sniper calls the police and requests that the American Ambassador come to the hotel room. The Ambassador, also assuming the hostage taker is Lambert, decides to go to the hotel room, though Dannahay says he shouldn't go, as Lambert is a spy working against the United States. When he arrives, he realizes the hostage taker isn't Lambert, but his former chauffeur, Donald Grayson. An ex-soldier suffering from PTSD, Grayson is motivated by his anger after being fired from his various jobs at US Embassies due to his condition.

Dannahay works out the same fact based on various clues, and visits the actual Harry Lambert, who is at a house with his mistress. Dannahay and Lambert go to the Hotel where the hostage situation is taking place.

During a food delivery, Aliki escapes the hotel room. Grayson finally makes his demands, and requests a fourth man be sent to his room. Dannahay convinces Lambert to be the fourth man, telling him he will a hide a gun on the route up to the helicopter that Grayson has requested.

En route the helicopter, Lambert successfully retrieves the loaded gun, and as the four men are about to get on the helicopter, he attempt to shoot Grayson. However, Dannahay has loaded the gun with blanks that fire before he eventually fires a real bullet, wounding Grayson. With the extra time the blanks give him, Grayson has time to use his own gun to fatally shoot Lambert. Inspector Moreno realizes what has happened and confronts Dannahay, who he suspects of engineering the situation in order to have Lambert killed. As the film ends, Moreno suggests that it may be better to keep his nose out of family squabbles.

== Cast ==
- Tony Musante as John Dannahay
- Claudia Cardinale as Aliki
- John Steiner as Donald Grayson
- John Forsythe as the American Ambassador
- Renzo Palmer as Parenti
- Fabrizio Jovine as Inspector Moreno
- Wolfango Soldati as Harry Lambert
- Gianrico Tondinelli as Jack
- Angela Goodwin as the Ambassador wife
- Anna Zinnemann as Renata
- Francesco Carnelutti as Agostino
- Luciano Catenacci as Vincent
- Alessandro Haber as Blondie
- Piero Palermini as Berto
- Gioia Scola as Maria Scoli

== Reception ==
Gabe Powers of Genre Grinder wrote "Goodbye & Amen is beautifully shot and tightly plotted with a clever third act twist and stunning climax."

== Home media ==
The film was released on Blu-ray by Radiance Films in February 2024, including for the first time on home video the original English-language track.
