= The Warning (1980 film) =

- Directed by: Damiano Damiani
- Written by: Damiano Damiani; Nicola Badalucco; Dino Maiuri; Massimo De Rita
- Produced by: Mario Cecchi Gori
- Starring: Giuliano Gemma; Martin Balsam; Laura Trotter; Giancarlo Zanetti
- Cinematography: Alfio Contini
- Edited by: Antonio Siciliano
- Music by: Riz Ortolani
- Production company: Capital Film
- Distributed by: Cineriz
- Release date: 15 August 1980 (Italy)
- Running time: 110 minutes
- Country: Italy
- Box office: ₤1.011 billion

The Warning (Italian: L'avvertimento) is a 1980 Italian crime thriller film co-written and directed by Damiano Damiani, and starring Giuliano Gemma and Martin Balsam.

== Plot ==
During a delicate investigation into various personalities of the upper business and banking world, colluding with organized crime, the chief police inspector Vincenzo Laganà is killed in his office for not accepting a bribe. Meanwhile, Inspector Antonio Barresi is about to resign, after having found money credited to his bank account and having received a phone call from unknown persons who clarify how he will have to behave during the investigation that will follow the assassination of Laganà.

After having followed the assassins in vain, Barresi makes an agreement with the commissioner to resolve the case. Silvia, Laganà's widow, is blackmailed by a woman who says she has proof that the deceased commissioner was a corrupt man: the blackmailers are arrested, however.

Barresi then questions Silvia and discovers that she had appropriated the bribe offered to her husband to bribe him, and manages to save her just a moment before the woman tries to commit suicide, desperate. At this point, Commissioner Barresi decides to play all out and go through with his investigation.

== Cast ==
- Giuliano Gemma as Commissiaro Antonio Baresi
- Martin Balsam as Questore Martorana
- Laura Trotter as Silvia Laganà
- Giancarlo Zanetti as Prizzi
- Guido Leontini as Gianfranco Puma
- Marcello Mandò as Pastore
- Franco Odoardi as Commissiaro Vincenzo Laganà
- Deddi Savagnone as Mrs. Vella
- John Karlsen as Ferdinando Violante
- Julian Jenkins as Lopez
- Geoffrey Copleston as Vesce
- Giordano Falzoni as Milanesi
- Vincent Gentile as Ludovico Vella
- Elio Marconato as Nicola Vella
- Horst Weinert as Giorgio Massimilano
- Fabiana Udenio

== Release ==
The Warning was released in Italy on August 15, 1980 where it was distributed by Cineriz. It grossed a total of 1.011 billion Italian lire on its theatrical run. It received a Special Mention at the 1980 Taormina Film Fest, and won the 'Cinema for UNICEF' prize.

== See also ==
- List of Italian films of 1980

== Notes ==
=== References ===
- Curti, Roberto (2013). Italian Crime Filmography, 1968-1980. McFarland. ISBN 978-0786469765.
