= Pizza Connection (film) =

1985 film

- Film poster under the title The Sicilian Connection
- Directed by: Damiano Damiani
- Written by: Damiano Damiani; Ernesto Gastaldi; Franco Marotta
- Produced by: Mario Cecchi Gori; Vittorio Cecchi Gori
- Starring: Michele Placido
- Cinematography: Sebastiano Celeste
- Edited by: Enzo Meniconi
- Music by: Carlo Savina
- Release date: February 1985
- Running time: 116 minutes
- Country: Italy
- Language: Italian

Pizza Connection is a 1985 Italian crime film directed by Damiano Damiani. It was entered into the 35th Berlin International Film Festival where it won an Honourable Mention. A version of the film dubbed for the USA was titled The Sicilian Connection, a title already used by another film from 1972.

== Cast ==
- Michele Placido as Mario Aloia
- Mark Chase as Michele Aloia
- Simona Cavallari as Cecilia Smedile
- Ida Di Benedetto as Amanda Smedile
- Massimo De Francovich as Chief Prosecutor Santalucia
- Renato Mori as Police Commissioner Giovanni Astarita
- Domenico Gennaro as Armando Ognibene
- Adriana Russo as the mistress of the villa
- Francesco Sciacca as Nicola Schirò
- Tony Sperandeo as Vincenzo
- Marcello Perracchio as Lawyer Masseria
- Leonardo Marino as Jimmy Galento
- Luigi Maria Burruano as policeman

== Awards ==
- Nastro d'Argento: Silver Ribbon award for best actor (Michele Placido)
- David di Donatello: David award for best music (Carlo Savina)
- Berlin Film Festival: Honourable Mention
