= Detective Belli =

1969 film

- Italian film poster
- Directed by: Romolo Guerrieri
- Screenplay by: Franco Verucci; Massimo D'Avak; Alberto Silvestri
- Based on: Macchie di belletto by Ludovico Dentice
- Produced by: Mario Cecchi Gori
- Starring: Franco Nero; Florinda Bolkan; Adolfo Celi; Delia Boccardo; Susanna Martinková; Renzo Palmer
- Cinematography: Roberto Gerardi
- Edited by: Marcello Malvestito
- Music by: Fred Bongusto
- Production company: Fair Film
- Distributed by: Interfilm
- Release date: 6 September 1969
- Running time: 103 minutes
- Country: Italy
- Language: Italian
- Box office: ₤616.63 million

Detective Belli (Italian: Un Detective) is a 1969 Italian poliziotteschi directed by Romolo Guerrieri and starring Franco Nero. It is based on the novel Macchie di belletto by Ludovico Dentice.

== Plot ==
The rude Commissioner Belli (Franco Nero) is entrusted with the investigation into the death of a record producer, this Mr. Romanis (Marino Masé). The man, shot dead in his apartment, not far from the centre of Rome, is found a few hours after his death. The gunshots shattered the window of the apartment, but no one seems to have noticed anything. In a whirlwind of events, the commissioner comes into contact with a series of characters: from the model Sandy (Delia Boccardo) to the pop singer Emanuelle (Susanna Martinková), from the lawyer Fontana (Adolfo Celi) to his beautiful wife, Mrs. Vera ( Florinda Bolkan). These characters revolve around the story, revealing uncomfortable details of Roma well. After the death of Mino (Maurizio Bonuglia) (son of the lawyer Fontana) and Sandy, Commissioner Belli will find himself faced with the truth, unmasking the unsuspected murderess.

== Cast ==
- Franco Nero as Detective Stefano Belli
- Florinda Bolkan as Vera Fontana
- Adolfo Celi as Lawyer Fontana
- Delia Boccardo as Sandy Bronson
- Susanna Martinková as Emmanuelle
- Renzo Palmer as Commissioner Balsamo
- Roberto Bisacco as Claude
- Maurizio Bonuglia as Mino Fontana
- Laura Antonelli as Franca
- Geoffrey Copleston as Police Chief
- Silvia Dionisio as Gabriella
- Marino Masé as Romanis

== Background and style ==
Film critic and historian Roberto Curti identifies Detective Belli and Days of Fire as examples of Italian crime films influenced by the themes of film noir. In a similar manner to his earlier giallo film The Sweet Body of Deborah, Guerrieri's film also employs tropes of the "sexy thriller" subgenre.

== Release ==
Detective Belli was released in Italy by Interfilm on September 6, 1969, where it grossed 616.63 million Italian lira. At the height of the popularity of the 1970s poliziotteschi cycle, the film was re-released under the title Tracce di rossetto e di droga per un detective ("Traces of lipstick and drugs for a detective"). Nero would later play another character with the surname Belli in 1973's High Crime; the character in that film differs from the corrupt protagonist of Guerrieri's film.

=== Reception ===
Critic Giovanni Buttafava praised the film's ending, describing it as "nocturnal, stylized, à la Jean-Pierre Melville, with the cold yet emotionally charged confrontation between the half-rotten-half-clean cop Franco Nero and Florinda Bolkan, with stylistic traits of film noir mythologizing which were rare in Italy, and rather remarkable as well". Curti praised Guerrieri's work on the film, stating that it "amply shows that he's an accomplished director in his own right".
