= Jo Champa =

American actress and model (born 1968)

- Born: January 23, 1968 (age 58); Long Branch, New Jersey, United States
- Occupations: Actress, producer

Rosina Jo Champa (born January 23, 1968) is an actress, producer and model.

Champa was born in 1968 in Long Branch, New Jersey, but grew up in Rome, Italy. She became a model there as a teenager. Before the age of 18, she was already one of Gianni Versace's favorite models. As such she turned to the Italian film industry in 1986, with various screen acting assignments, for directors including Claude d'Anna (Salome, 1986), Ettore Scola (The Family, 1987), Massimo Troisi (Le vie del Signore sono finite, 1987), and Damiano Damiani (Il Sole Buio, 1990). At the pinnacle of her career, Champa returned to the United States, starring in Steven Seagal's Out for Justice (1991), followed two years later by Bernardo Bertolucci's Little Buddha (1993), and then Don Juan DeMarco (1994) by Jeremy Leven.

In 1998, she married Joseph Farrell, a Hollywood producer and marketer and an influential member of the Academy. Later in the ‘90s, she mostly worked for television guest starring in TV series such as Walker, Texas Ranger, JAG, and CSI: Miami. Champa can also be found in Helmut Newton's book Sumo where he found her to be one of his favorite models.

In 2004 after many in vitro cycles she and her husband had a son, Sean Farrell.

Most recently, she was in Somewhere (2010), directed by Sofia Coppola.

In Italy, she has hosted the very successful fashion TV show for RAI TV, Kermesse. Champa has also served as special contributing editor and columnist for the Italian edition of Vogue and L'Uomo Vogue.

Italian Vogue has written that "She is an icon of Italian style. We love her because she is a refined and creative woman, a tireless supporter of Italian cinema and culture in the United States."

She received the America Award of the Italy-USA Foundation in 2009.

She has produced for the Academy of Motion Picture Arts and Sciences the tribute event "An Academy Tribute to Sophia Loren", with special guest Sophia Loren, with Billy Crystal hosting John Travolta, Christian De Sica and Rob Marshall among many others.

In December 2011, she produced the launch of the Andrea Bocelli Foundation at the Beverly Hilton Hotel in Beverly Hills, California, with a dinner and special performance starring Andrea Bocelli. She was the producer of the prime-time special of that same event for Sky Italia.

In June 2012, she hosted and moderated a Special Evening for David and Susan Rockefeller at MOMA in New York presenting Susan Rockefeller's documentary, Mission of Mermaids.

In September 2015, she hosted the gala evening for Sky Italy of Andrea Bocelli's charitable foundation in Florence, Italy.

In 2016, she created, co-wrote, co-produced and hosted "Jo's Hollywood" for the TV channel SkyCinema in Italy from February 20 until the 28th it ran every day and was extremely successful in its ratings, a docu-reality about the history of Hollywood up until the Oscars.

It ran a second season in 2017, again on SKYCinema in Italy.

On July 28, 2019, Jo Champa was the emcee for "Celebrity Fight Night in Italy" working once again with "the Andrea Bocelli Foundation" at The Bocelli home in Forte dei Marmi Italy.
