= Go Gorilla Go =

- Italian theatrical release poster
- Italian: Vai gorilla
- Directed by: Tonino Valerii
- Screenplay by: Massimo De Rita; Dino Maiuri
- Story by: Massimo De Rita; Dino Maiuri
- Produced by: Mario Cecchi Gori
- Cinematography: Mario Vulpiani
- Edited by: Antonio Siciliano
- Music by: Franco Bixio; Fabio Frizzi; Vince Tempera
- Production company: Capital Film
- Distributed by: Cineriz
- Release date: November 14, 1975 (Italy)
- Running time: 100 minutes
- Country: Italy
- Language: Italian
- Box office: ₤1.846 billion

Go Gorilla Go (Italian: Vai gorilla) is a 1975 Italian poliziottesco film directed by Tonino Valerii.

The script of the film continued some scenes from the debut film of Valerii, Per il gusto di uccidere, including the final duel between Fabio Testi and Antonio Marsina. The censorship commission banned the film to people under 18 years old and Valerii refused the cuts requested by the production to lower the ban; the film eventually had a significant commercial success, grossing over 1.8 billion lire.

== Cast ==
- Fabio Testi as Marco Sartori
- Renzo Palmer as Gaetani Sampioni
- Claudia Marsani as Vera Sampioni
- Al Lettieri as Ciro Musante
- Saverio Marconi as Piero Sartori
- Adriano Amidei Migliano as Police Commissioner Vannuzzi
- Antonio Marsina as Berto
- Luciano Catenacci as Manager of the Shooting Range
- Giuliana Calandra as Sampioni's Wife

== Production ==
Gori contacted Tonino Valerii who specialized in spaghetti westerns. Valerii's latest film My Name is Nobody (1973) was his most popular to date. Valerii and screenwriter Massimo De Rita started developing a few ideas and had three story outlines for the film. These ideas were an omnibus film about a police patrol on a night shift, the second was a revenge film that Valerii described as "in the vein of Death Wish" about a lawyer who uses his knowledge of crime to seek revenge on gangs. The last idea was a story about a bodyguard. Valerii saw a newspaper on Gori's desk about a wealthy Italian industrialist who moved abroad in fear of being kidnapped. Feeling that the story captured the era that Italy was in, they decided on the story of the bodyguard (or gorillas as they were nicknamed). Valerii says they convinced Gori on the film when De Rita told him the title "Go Gorilla!".

Valerii cast Fabio Testi in the role after he had been in a few films (Blood River and Red Coat) that did poorly in the box office. Al Lettieri had a small role as Testi's best friend in the film. It would be one of Lettieri's final roles as he died of a heart attack on October 18, 1975. For the villain, Valerii cast Antonio Marsina who had recently given up acting after a few roles in 1960s Westerns and had become a photographer. Marsina arrived with his girlfriend who auditioned for a part but was not cast. Valerii thought that Marsina had an interesting face and got him to do a screen test which got him the role.

Valerii stated that the film's script was written quickly with a lot of dialogue being re-written in the editing room to "rescue" a few scenes. The film was shot at De Paolis Studios in Rome.

== Release ==
Go Gorilla Go was distributed in Italy by Cineriz on November 14, 1975. The film received a v.m. 18 rating in Italy, making it not permitted to an audience under the age of 18. When this happened, Cecci Gori insisted that Valerii cut the most violent scenes as requested. Valerii did not accept this and no cuts were made.

The film was a great box office success in Italy, where it grossed a total of 1,846,285,530 Italian lire. It re-launched Fabio Testi's career as one of Italy's most popular action film actors.

== Footnotes ==
=== References ===
- Curti, Roberto (2013). Italian Crime Filmography, 1968-1980. McFarland. ISBN 978-0786469765.
