= The Dark Sun =

- Directed by: Damiano Damiani
- Written by: Damiano Damiani; Ennio De Concini
- Produced by: Mario Cecchi Gori; Vittorio Cecchi Gori
- Starring: Michael Paré; Jo Champa
- Cinematography: Sebastiano Celeste
- Music by: Riz Ortolani
- Release date: 1990
- Country: Italy
- Language: Italian

Il sole buio, internationally released as The Dark Sun and Dark Sun, is a 1990 Italian thriller-drama film directed by Damiano Damiani.

== Plot ==
After the death of his mother a man returns to his hometown in Italy. Once there he is forced to participate in various crimes committed by the mafia.

== Cast ==
- Michael Paré as Ruggero Brickman
- Jo Champa as Lucia Isgrò
- Phyllis Logan as Attorney Camilla Staffa
- Erland Josephson as Attorney Belmonte
- Luciano Catenacci as Commissioner Catena
- Leopoldo Trieste as Alfonso Isgrò
- Tano Cimarosa as Momo
- Mattia Sbragia as the journalist
- Victoria Zinny as the prison warden
- Tony Sperandeo as the drug dealer

== See also ==
- List of Italian films of 1990
