= Luciano Catenacci =

Italian actor and production manager

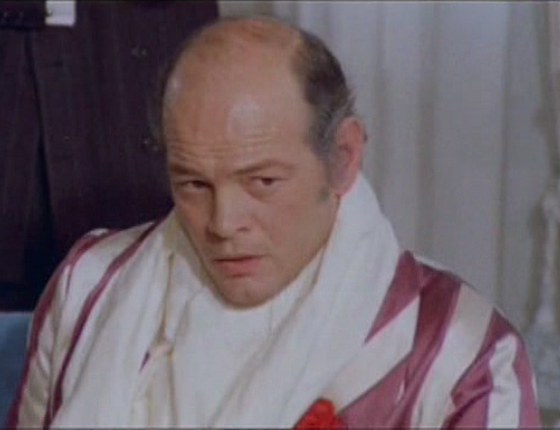
- Catenacci in Italian Graffiti (1973)
- Born: 13 April 1933; Rome, Italy
- Died: 4 October 1990 (aged 57); Melbourne, Australia
- Occupation: Actor

Luciano Catenacci (13 April 1933 – 4 October 1990) was an Italian actor and production manager who worked on mainly Italian produced films during the 1960s, 1970s and 1980s.

== Life and career ==
Born in Rome, Catenacci started his career as a production manager, and was later convinced by several directors including Mario Bava to move into acting. After appearing in several films with the pseudonyms Luciano Lorcas and Max Lawrence, in the early 1970s he definitely started being credited with his real name. Mainly cast in roles of villains and criminals, he is best known for his performance as Benito Mussolini in Damiano Damiani's The Assassin of Rome.

== Selected filmography ==
- Lady Morgan's Vengeance (1965) - Physician (uncredited)
- Z7 Operation Rembrandt (1966)
- Kill, Baby, Kill (1966) - Karl the Burgomeister
- Fury of Johnny Kid (1967) - Campos Henchman
- Come rubare un quintale di diamanti in Russia (1967) - Brett
- The Stranger Returns (1967) - Townsman (uncredited)
- Halleluja for Django (1967) - Jarrett Gang
- Un colpo da re (1967) - Gang member
- Black Jesus (1968) - Sergeant
- Hell in Normandy (1968) - Navy Sailor
- The Son of Black Eagle (1968)
- The Battle of Sinai (1968) - Arden
- The Battle of El Alamein (1969) - Sgt. O'Hara
- A Complicated Girl (1969)
- The Battle of the Damned (1969) - Sgt. Dean
- Hour X Suicide Patrol (1969) - Pvt. Jimmy Clay
- 36 ore all'inferno (1969) - Landing
- Uccidete Rommel (1969) - Italian Soldier
- Rangers: attacco ora X (1970) - Sergeant Francone
- In the Folds of the Flesh (1970) - Antoine
- Bolidi sull'asfalto a tutta birra! (1970) - Official in Riccione race
- El último día de la guerra (1970) - German Aide
- Colt in the Hand of the Devil (1970) - El Loco
- Due bianchi nell'Africa nera (1970) - Col. Von Tambler
- Blackie the Pirate (1971) - Chain (uncredited)
- Confessions of a Police Captain (1971) - Ferdinando Lomunno
- The Price of Death (1971) - Sheriff Tom Stanton
- Short Night of Glass Dolls (1971) - Morgue Employee
- Ben and Charlie (1972) - Kurt
- It Can Be Done Amigo (1972) - James
- The Assassin of Rome (1972) - Benito Mussolini
- La Scoumoune (1972)
- The Sicilian Connection (1972) - Tony
- We Want the Colonels (1973) - The Highway Patroller
- Super Bitch (1973) - Gamble
- Here We Go Again, Eh Providence? (1973) - Count de Ortega
- Long Lasting Days (1973) - Spyros
- Italian Graffiti (1973) - Il Reverendo
- Almost Human (1974) - Ugo Majone
- Carambola! (1974) - Cpt. Howard Johnson
- How to Kill a Judge (1975) - Meloria the Attorney
- Manhunt in the City (1975) - Lt. Pascucci
- Syndicate Sadists (1975) - Conti
- Go Gorilla Go (1975) - The Manager of the Shooting Range
- The Tough Ones (1976) - Ferdinando Gerace
- Crime Busters (1977) - Fred 'Curly' Cline
- The Biggest Battle (1978) - British Communications Officer
- Goodbye & Amen (1978) - Vincent
- Brothers Till We Die (1978) - Adalberto Maria Perrone
- Odds and Evens (1978) - Paragoulis the Greek
- L'ultimo guappo (1978) - Don Pasquale Ronciglio
- A Dangerous Toy (1979) - A bodyguard of Griffo
- A Man on His Knees (1979) - The commissioner
- Lion of the Desert (1980) - Italian Soldier
- Moving Out (1983) - Maria's Father
- Street Hero (1984) - Ciccio
- Initiation (1987) - The Bit Part
- Evil Angels (1988) - The Jury
- The Bit Part (1988) - Mario
- The Dark Sun (1990) - Commissioner Catena
- Volevo i pantaloni (1990) - Michele
