= A Genius, Two Partners and a Dupe =

- Italian: Un genio, due compari, un pollo
- Directed by: Damiano Damiani
- Screenplay by: Ernesto Gastaldi; Damiano Damiani; Fulvio Morsella
- Story by: Ernesto Gastaldi; Fulvio Morsella; Sergio Leone
- Produced by: Claudio Mancini; Fulvio Morsella
- Starring: Terence Hill; Miou-Miou; Robert Charlebois; Patrick McGoohan; Jean Martin; Klaus Kinski
- Cinematography: Giuseppe Ruzzolini
- Edited by: Nino Baragli
- Music by: Ennio Morricone
- Production companies: Rafran Cinematografica; A.M.L.F.; Rialto Film
- Distributed by: Titanus (Italy); A.M.L.F. (France); TOBIS Film (West Germany)
- Release dates: 16 December 1975 (West Germany); 19 December 1975 (Italy); 21 January 1976 (France)
- Running time: 117 minutes
- Countries: Italy; France; West Germany
- Language: English

A Genius, Two Partners and a Dupe (Italian: Un genio, due compari, un pollo) is a 1975 Spaghetti Western comedy film directed by Damiano Damiani and starring Terence Hill, Miou-Miou, Robert Charlebois, Patrick McGoohan, Jean Martin, and Klaus Kinski. The film is about three con artists (Hill, Miou-Miou, Charlesbois) who plot a heist to steal a fortune from an Army calvary officer (McGoohan). It was based on an idea by executive producer Sergio Leone, and was notably the last Western the filmmaker worked on.

== Plot ==
Joe Thanks is a genius conman. He conducts various schemes with his two friends: Creole Steam Engine Bill and his girlfriend Lucy. Lucy loves both men, and they in turn both vie for her affection.

Joe formulates an extremely elaborate plan to steal $300,000 from Major Cabot, an Indian-hating cavalry man, and in doing so save the Indian land he is trying to steal. Every time the plan seems to be failing, Joe has another trick up his sleeve. The film climaxes with a stagecoach chase and a gigantic explosion.

== Cast ==
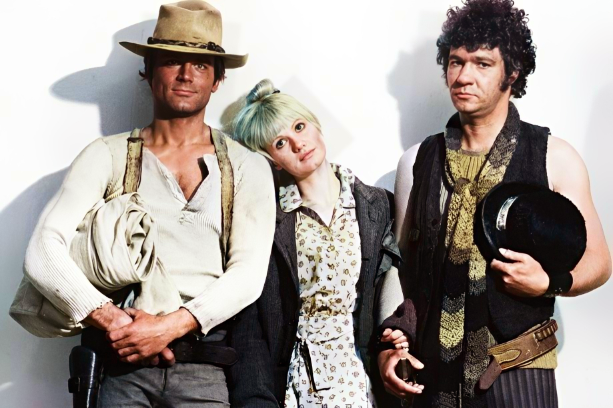
Terence Hill, Miou-Miou and Robert Charlebois during the film shooting (1975)

- Terence Hill as Joe Thanks
- Miou-Miou as Lucy / Lilla
- Patrick McGoohan as Major Cabot
- Robert Charlebois as Steam Train Bill / Paul Lambet
- Klaus Kinski as Doc Foster
- Jean Martin as Colonel Pembroke
- Raimund Harmstorf as Sergeant Milton
- Pietro Vida as Jerry / Jelly Roll
- Rik Battaglia as Captain
- Mario Valgoi as Thomas Trader
- Mario Brega as Krutscher
- Miriam Mahler as Pembroke's daughter
- Clara Colosimo as Madam
- Benito Stefanelli as Mortimer
- Roy Bosier as Jeremy
- Frederick Ledebur as Don Felipe
- Renato Baldini as Sheriff
- Lina Franchi as Mary Gomez

== Production ==
The second film produced by Sergio Leone following My Name Is Nobody, it was originally intended as a remake of Bertrand Blier's Going Places in a western setting, but during the screenwriting process it moved towards something different, closer to The Sting. Leone chose Damiano Damiani to direct it, partly for his appreciation of Damiani's western A Bullet for the General, and partly for his recent box office hits, notably Confessions of a Police Captain. Giuliano Montaldo served as second unit director, while Leone himself directed the opening scene. Parts of the film were shot at the San Juan River and Monument Valley in Utah.

The original negative of the film was stolen and never recovered, as Leone refused to pay the ransom. The film was eventually completed printing a new negative from the positive of some sequences and using alternative takes.

Patrick McGoohan's lines were dubbed by an uncredited Robert Rietti. He was unavailable to travel back to Rome to record his lines, due to scheduling conflicts with the film Silver Streak.

== Release ==
A Genius, Two Partners and a Dupe was released in Italy on 16 December 1975. It was released the same day in West Germany as Nobody ist der Größte ("Nobody is the greatest").

== Reception ==
The film's box office was disappointing, stopping at 790 million lire in Italy. Leone later claimed to have made "a big mistake" choosing Damiani as director, as Damiani was excellent for drama but lacked humour.
