= Nicola Badalucco =

Italian screenwriter

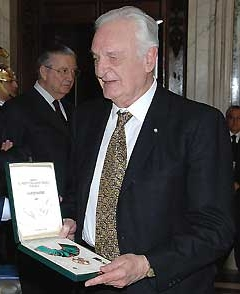
- Born: 13 May 1929; Milan, Italy
- Died: 17 June 2015 (aged 86); Roma, Italy
- Occupation: Screenwriter
- Years active: 1969–2015

Nicola Badalucco (13 May 1929 – 17 June 2015) was an Italian screenwriter. He has written for 38 films since 1969. He was nominated for an Academy Award at the 42nd Academy Awards in the category Original Screenplay for the film The Damned.

He was born in Milan, Italy.

== Selected filmography ==
- The Damned (1969)
- Roma Bene (1971)
- Death in Venice (1971)
- Black Turin (1972)
- Libera, My Love (1973)
- Flatfoot (1973)
- Mean Frank and Crazy Tony (1973)
- Three Tough Guys (1974)
- Policewoman (1974)
- Wanted: Babysitter (1975)
- Due cuori, una cappella (1975)
- Street People (1976)
- And Agnes Chose to Die (1976)
- Black Journal (1977)
- I Am Afraid (1977)
- Goodbye and Amen (1978)
- Closed Circuit (1978)
- A Man on His Knees (1979)
- The Warning (1980)
- Il turno (1981)
- La piovra (1984)
- Mussolini and I (1985)
- Farewell Moscow (1987)
- The Gold Rimmed Glasses (1987)
- The Secret of the Sahara (1987)
- Rossini! Rossini! (1991)
- L'Atlantide (1992)
