= Arturo's Island =

1957 novel by Elsa Morante

- Italian language original cover for L'isola di Arturo (1957)
- Author: Elsa Morante
- Original title: L'isola di Arturo
- Translator: Isabel Quigley
- Language: Italian
- Publisher: Giulio Einaudi Editore
- Publication date: 1957
- Publication place: Italy
- English publication date: 1959

Arturo's Island (Italian: L'isola di Arturo) is a 1957 novel by Italian author Elsa Morante, published by Giulio Einaudi Editore. It won the Strega Prize for that year. It was translated into English in 1959 by Isabel Quigly, published by Alfred A. Knopf in the United States and William Collins, Sons in the United Kingdom.

A film adaptation directed by Damiano Damiani was released in 1962, winning Best Film at the San Sebastián International Film Festival. It played in theaters in the United States in 1964.

== Plot synopsis ==
In the novel, Arturo, a small boy, grows up on the island of Procida in the Bay of Naples. The island is the location of a penitentiary. Arturo lives in a gloomy mansion bequeathed to his father. The boy's education comes from books dedicated to male hero worship and chivalry in the mansion's library. Arturo idolizes his dead mother. She died giving birth to him. He worships his tall, blond father, who is often absent. Arturo is a natural athlete who enjoys boating and swimming on the island.

The only creature with whom he can share joy is his dog, Immacolatella. The building of the same name, including its historic fountain, is a famous edifice that stands at the water's edge at the port of Naples. As Arturo's mother died giving birth to him, his beloved dog dies, giving birth to her only litter of pups.

When Arturo is 14, his father brings home a new bride, Nunziatella, a woman only two years older than Arturo. Hearing his parents make love at night disturbs the boy. Soon Arturo falls in love with Nunziatella, who is attracted to him but rejects his sexual advances. Nunziatella gives birth to a blond child who, for a time, replaces Arturo in her affections. Later, Arturo discovers that his father has fallen in love with a prisoner in the island's penitentiary. In the novel's finale, the convict is released from the penitentiary. Feeling betrayed by his father, Arturo leaves the enchanted island for the mainland.
