= Gino Girolimoni =

Italian photographer and justice miscarriage victim (1889–1961)

Gino Girolimoni (1 October 1889 – 19 November 1961) was an Italian photographer wrongly accused of being "The Monster of Rome" (Italian: il mostro di Roma) who killed children in Rome during the era of Fascist Italy. Girolimoni, il mostro di Roma, a 1972 film by Damiano Damiani, recounts the persecution that Girolimoni underwent in spite of his innocence.

== Biography ==
=== Early life ===
Born in Rome on 1 October 1889, Girolimoni worked as a photographer and mediator for workers who were victims of accidents at work. Through his job, he managed to achieve a certain prosperity.

=== Miscarriage of justice ===
==== Monster of Rome murders ====
Between the period of 1924 to 1927, Rome was hit by a series of kidnappings, rapes and murders, to which seven little girls fell prey. The first of them was 4-year-old Emma Giacomini, who was kidnapped while playing in a public garden in Monte Mario on 31 March 1924. Later that day, her body, showing signs of violence but no sexual assault, was found. The newspapers became interpreters of popular anguish and demands that the person responsible be arrested. Benito Mussolini, who was disappointed by the failures of the investigators and fearing that the prestige of his regime could be affected, appointed the then police chief Arturo Bocchini as the main investigator.

On 4 June 1924, 3-year-old Bianca Carlieri was found raped and strangled inside the Basilica of Saint Paul Outside the Walls. On 24 November 1924, 4-year-old Rosa Pelli was kidnapped and later found murdered in the same basilica. The latter's funeral was attended by over 100,000 people who, especially in the poorer areas of the city, were on the verge of starting riots in demand of capturing the killer. Despite pressure from the Italian fascist regime to capture the murderer, other attacks soon followed. On 28 May 1925, 6-year-old Elsa Berni disappeared, with her body later found at the Lungotevere Gianicolense. On 26 August 1925, an 18-month-old baby girl named Celeste Tagliaferro was found still alive at the Scalo Tuscolano, while 6-year-old Elvira Coletti was found alive near the Michelangelo Bridge. On 12 March 1927, 5-year-old Armanda Leonardi was found murdered on Aventine Hill. All five murder victims showed the same signs of sexual and physical abuse.

The second murder, that of Carlieri, came to be known as the crime of Biochetta; it raised a wave of indignation throughout the country for the entire month of June in 1924. A large crowd attended her funeral and for days the press carried the news with headlines that aimed to fuel the desire to restore justice and order. The public ire soon began to center around the assassination of socialist politician Giacomo Matteotti.

==== Investigations and aftermath ====
The police arrested numerous individuals, focusing predominantly on cripples and the mentally ill. One man, 38-year-old driver Amedeo Sterbini, who was described as a violent and quarrelsome character, committed suicide by drinking muriatic acid. In his pockets, two letters were found in which he proclaimed himself as innocent and stated that he would rather kill himself than risk being arrested. Pressure from superiors, the media, and the public prompted the police to immediately search for a culprit. Despite numerous witnesses describing the killer as a tall man in his 50s who dressed neatly and sported a moustache, the policemen arrested Girolimoni, a young photographer who was known as a nice, polite individual. The news of his arrest was published in the newspapers with great prominence, announcing that the Monster of Rome had finally been captured.

On 9 May 1927, the Agenzia Stefani wrote that, after "laborious investigations", the investigators had uncovered "irrefutable evidence" against Girolimoni. The criminalist Samuele Ottolenghi, a follower of Cesare Lombroso's philosophy, claimed to recognize several somatic traits in the arrested man. Girolimoni's arrest came about after a 13-year-old waitress told her landlord about a man who spoke to her from time to time; suspicious, the landlord waited for the stranger to show up, wrote down his license plate numbers and later informed police, who promptly arrested Girolimoni. The evidence against him was flimsy; at the time, it was argued that twelve dresses had been found in his closet, supposedly demonstrating that he changed often with different outfits while attacking and to avoid detection. Despite the lack of concrete evidence, the investigators pressured him into confessing for four months, which Girolimoni never did. He was also accused of other crimes, such as the murder of a Paduan girl in 1919, which he also denied. It all ended on 8 March 1928, the day he was acquitted of all charges due to discrepancies found in the testimonies collected before and after his arrest, some of which was later found to be fabricated. The acquittal received barely any press coverage; for example, the newspaper La Tribuna gave the news in a small paragraph on page four. Girolimoni's reputation was irreparably tarnished even after his acquittal, and he died in poverty in 1961, having never been compensated for the wrongful accusation.

During Girolimoni's incarceration, a police commissioner by the name of Giuseppe Dosi was allowed access to the case files. After reading through them, he became convinced of his innocence and opposed his superiors, for which he was arrested and interned at an insane asylum for seventeen months. He was released in 1940 and reintegrated to the police force after the fall of fascism, working on important cases in the country, and later wrote a book presenting his findings on the case. During the investigation, Dosi identified as a more likely suspect an English pastor named Ralph Lyonel Bridges. Born in Cheltenham in 1856, Bridges was a deacon at The Holy Trinity Church of England in via Romagna who had been repeatedly accused of molesting children while serving in New York City but had never been convicted. After returning to his native England, he held the office of a military chaplain for some time, during which he reportedly suffered a bad head injury. He settled in Rome with his Canadian wife, Florence Caroline Jarvis, sometime in 1922, settling in an apartment in via Po where the pair resided until the spring of 1927. During this time, the murders attributed to the Monster of Rome occurred.

=== Later life and death ===
Despite his acquittal, Girolimoni never recovered from the false accusations and the miscarriage of justice. He was no longer able to continue his work and soon lost all of his assets; he later tried to survive poverty by repairing bicycles or being a cobbler in the popular districts of San Lorenzo and Testaccio. He died 19 November 1961 in poverty. Only a few friends attended the funeral, which was celebrated on 26 November 1961 in the Papal Basilica of Saint Lawrence outside the Walls, including Dosi. The body was buried in the Verano Cemetery at the expense of some friends in the grave of an acquaintance, which was subsequently moved to a grave on the ground and finally dispersed in the common ossuary.

== See also ==
- List of miscarriage of justice cases
- List of unsolved murders (1900–1979)

== Bibliography ==
- Agostini, Emmanuele; Sciarelli, Federica (2010). Il mostro innocente. La verità su Girolimoni condannato dalla cronaca e dalla storia [The Innocent Monster: The Truth About Girolimoni Condemned by the News and History] (in Italian). Milan: Rizzoli. ISBN 978-88-17-03546-0.
- Armati, Cristiano; Selvetella, Yari (2006). Roma criminale [Criminal Rome] (in Italian). Rome: Newton Compon. pp. 62–76. ISBN 88-541-0706-9.
- Damiani, Damiano; Strazzulla, Gaetano (1972). Girolimoni il "mostro" e il fascism [Girolimoni the "Monster" and Fascism] (in Italian). Bologna: Cappelli.
- Dosi, Giuseppe (1938). Il mio testamento autobiografico [My Autobiographical Will] (in Italian). Vasto.
- Dosi, Giuseppe (1973). Il mostro e il detective [The Monster and the Detective] (in Italian). Florence: Vallecchi.
- Palmegiani, Armando; Sanvitale, Fabio (2011). Un mostro chiamato Girolimoni. Una storia di serial killer di bambine e innocenti [A Monster Called Girolimoni: A Story of Serial Killers, Girls, and Innocents] (in Italian). Rome: Sovera. ISBN 978-88-6652-003-0.
- Polidoro, Massimo (2005). Cronaca nera. Indagine sui delitti che hanno sconvolto l'Italia [Black News: Investigation into the Crimes that Have Shocked Italy] (in Italian). Casale Monferrato: Edizioni Piemme. pp. 23–68. ISBN 88-384-8132-6.
