= Renzo Palmer =

Italian actor

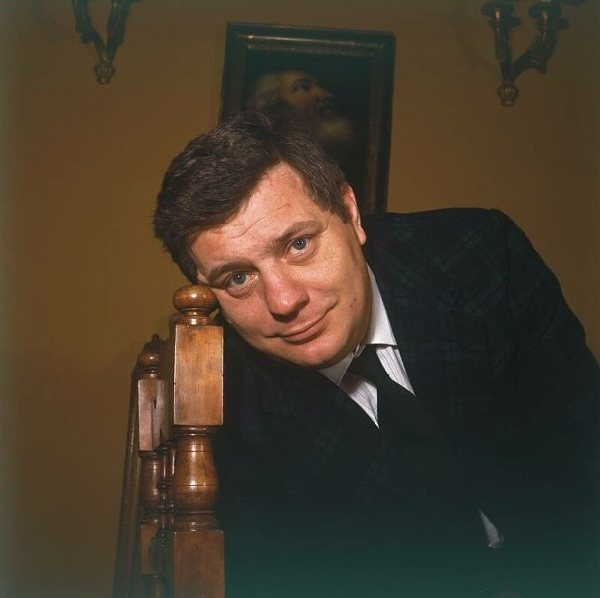
- Born: Lorenzo Bigatti; 20 December 1929; Milan, Italy
- Died: 3 June 1988 (aged 58); Milan, Italy
- Occupation: Actor
- Years active: 1957–1988

Renzo Palmer (20 December 1929 – 3 June 1988) was an Italian film, television and stage actor. He appeared in more than 60 films between 1957 and 1988.

== Life and career ==
Born in Milan as Lorenzo Bigatti, Palmer was the adopted son of the stage actress Kiki Palmer (from which, born Giulia Fogliata, he inherited his stage name). After leaving his law studies, he debuted in 1955 on radio, after being spotted at an audition for singers, and then worked for two years in the Company of Prose of "Radio Roma". In 1957 Palmer made his television debut with L'avaro, directed by Vittorio Cottafavi; the same year he also made his theatrical debut at the Piccolo Teatro in Milan, in the revue I pallinisti. From then, even continuing to appear in prestigious stage works it was the television that assured him popularity and professional satisfaction, thanks to the numerous successful television films and TV series in which he starred.

Palmer was also a versatile film character actor, mainly active in commedia all'italiana and in poliziotteschi film genre. He also was a radio and television host, and a popular voice actor. He died of cancer in Milan at 58.

== Selected filmography ==
- Who Hesitates is Lost (1960) - Cavicchioni
- Un dollaro di fifa (1960) - Smile
- The Lovemakers (1961) - (uncredited)
- Totòtruffa 62 (1961) - Baldassarre
- The Fascist (1961) - Partisan Taddei
- Battle of the Worlds (1961) - Barrington
- Pugni pupe e marinai (1961) - Marco Pennacchiotti
- Obiettivo ragazze (1963)
- Son of the Circus (1963) - Paper, the pianist
- Revenge of the Musketeers (1963)
- Shivers in Summer (1964) - Barsanti
- The Visit (1964) - Conductor
- Cavalca e uccidi (1964) - Pastor Andrews
- La ragazza in prestito (1964)
- Con rispetto parlando (1965)
- Seven Golden Men (1965)
- Seven Golden Men Strike Again (1966) - (uncredited)
- The Mona Lisa Has Been Stolen (1966) - Le voleur de tableaux
- Europa canta (1966) - Sheriff Toro
- Web of Violence (1966) - Commissioner
- La volpe e le camelie (1966)
- Danger: Diabolik (1968) - Mr. Hammond - Second Minister of the Interior
- A Minute to Pray, a Second to Die (1968)
- Spirits of the Dead (1968) - Priest (segment "William Wilson")
- House of Cards (1968) - Pietro Rossi - the false monk
- Buona Sera, Mrs. Campbell (1968) - Mayor
- Detective Belli (1969) - Commissioner Baldo
- Eagles Over London (1969) - Sgt. Donald Mulligan
- Dead of Summer (1970) - Alexandre Grasse (voice, uncredited)
- The Eroticist (1972) - Father Lucion
- Sting of the West (1972) - Rags Manure
- Massacre in Rome (1973) - Giorgio
- Rugantino (1973) - Cardinal Severini
- Street Law (1974) - Police Inspector
- White Fang to the Rescue (1974) - RCMP Sergeant
- Nipoti miei diletti (1974) - Menico
- How to Kill a Judge (1975) - Vincenzo Terrasini
- Go Gorilla Go (1975) - Gaetano Sampioni
- Soldier of Fortune (1976) - Fra' Ludovico da Rieti
- The Big Racket (1976) - Giulti
- The Cassandra Crossing (1976) - Train Station Ticket Collector (uncredited)
- Cross Shot (1976) - Maselli
- The Cynic, the Rat and the Fist (1977) - Commissioner Astalli
- Il mostro (1977)
- Ligabue (1977, TV Mini-Series) - Mayor
- Goodbye & Amen (1978) - Parenti
- La dottoressa preferisce i marinai (1981) - Captain Carlo Morelli
- The Salamander (1981) - Carabinieri Major Giorgione
- The Family (1987) - Uncle Nicola (old)
- Giallo sera (Night Jello) 1983
