= Ralph Brydges =

English suspected serial killer (1856–1946)

- Born: Ralph Lyonel Brydges; 1856; Cheltenham, Gloucestershire, England
- Died: 18 April 1946 (aged 89–90); Daytona Beach, Florida, U.S.
- Other name: "The Monster of Rome"
- Conviction: N/A
- Penalty: N/A

Details
- Victims: 5–9 (suspected)
- Span of crimes: 1923–1928
- Country: Italy, Switzerland, Germany, South Africa
- States: Rome, Geneva, Gauteng
- Date apprehended: N/A

Ralph Lyonel Brydges (1856 – 18 April 1946) was an English Protestant pastor and paedophile who was accused of being "The Monster of Rome" (Italian: il mostro di Roma), a suspected serial killer of young girls who was active in Rome from 1924 to 1927. Another man, photographer Gino Girolimoni, was wrongfully accused but later exonerated of the crimes, which the inspector Giuseppe Dosi later accused Brydges of committing. Brydges was never tried for the crimes, amidst pressure from the British government, and later left Italy, supposedly committing other killings in other countries before his death in 1946.

== Biography ==
=== Early life ===
Bridges was born in Cheltenham, England, in 1856. He studied for Church of England ministry in Canada, graduating at Wycliffe College, Toronto in 1879, and was ordained deacon in 1881 and priest in 1882 by the Anglican Bishop of Toronto, while serving as curate at St James' Church, Toronto. From 1883 to 1913 he ministered in the United States in the Episcopal Church of the USA, during which period he was awarded a Master of Arts (MA) degree by Columbia University in 1897. During the 1910s, he had been repeatedly accused of molesting children while serving in New York City but was never convicted. He returned to Canada to serve as Moral and Social Reform Chaplain in the Diocese of Toronto from 1913 to 1916. In the latter year he returned to serve in the First World War as a Temporary Chaplain of the Forces until 1919, during which he reportedly suffered a bad head injury. He returned to Toronto to serve as curate of St Alban's Cathedral until 1922.

He settled in Rome with his Canadian wife, Florence Caroline Jarvis, sometime in 1922, settling in an apartment in via Po where the pair resided until the spring of 1927. During those years, he was Chaplain at the Holy Trinity Church in via Romagna; also during this time, the murders attributed to the Monster of Rome occurred.

=== Monster of Rome investigation ===
During Gino Girolimoni's incarceration, Italian police inspector Giuseppe Dosi was allowed access to the case files. After reading through them, he became convinced of his innocence and opposed his superiors, for which he was arrested and interned at an insane asylum for seventeen months. He was released in 1940 and reintegrated into the police force after the fall of the fascist regime in Italy, working on important cases in the country, and later wrote a book presenting his findings on the case. During the investigation, Dosi identified Brydges as a more likely suspect. On 24 April 1927, while on vacation in Capri, Brydges was arrested by the island's commissioner after being caught attempting to molest a young English girl, Patricia Blakensee, at the hotel. The commissioner was convinced that his guest had a profile compatible with that of the murderer, and was made additionally suspicious of the former's refusal to have his fingerprints taken. His English nationality and the discrepancy between his age and the supposed profile of the killer, which had been set at roughly 40, led to the English consulate in Naples to pressure for his release. Despite protests, Brydges' release was secured on 7 May 1927. Not long after, the couple fled back to Rome, where their track was lost.

On 13 April 1928, Brydges was travelling on board a ship returning from Beira, Mozambique, and returning to Canada. While the ship was anchored at the Port of Genoa, Dosi, who had begun investigating him after hearing testimony from a maid in Rome who described a man similar in appearance to him, boarded the ship and demanded to inspect Brydges' private quarters. While searching his bunkbed, Dosi found notes that referred to the times and places of the crimes; among them including a "St. Peter's Square" (from where Pelli was kidnapped), and the name "Charleri", which was similar to the surname of Carlieri, the killer's second victim. What stuck out in particular were handkerchiefs engraved with the initials "R.L.", which resembled a handkerchief found next to Pelli's body. In addition, Dosi cited that, much like what the Capri commissioner had told him, Brydges' left hand, except for one finger, was completely paralyzed. In the interrogations, Dosi also asked Brydges if he had ever used catalogues of ascetic books or art, as the crumpled, scorched remnants of one were found next to the body of Leonardi. To his shock, Brydges replied in the positive, claiming that he had picked some up from the Mowbray Library; however, this did not directly incriminate him, as that particular library was heavily frequented by clerics at the time. Using this circumstantial evidence and in spite of protests from representatives of the British consulate, Dosi formally arrested Brydges and subsequently had him imprisoned at a mental asylum in Santa Maria della Pietà. During his stay there, he was subjected to psychiatric examinations, which deduced that he was not a danger to society. Following mounting pressure from the Church of England and the British consulate, Brydges was released after three months and allowed to travel to Toronto, Canada. On 23 October 1929, he was formally acquitted after a preliminary investigation by Italy's Supreme Court of Cassation; by that time, he had long left the country.

According to Dosi's theories, Brydges was responsible for four other murders during his international travels that were all committed in countries in which he resided from 1923 to 1928. Aside from the Rome murders, he accused him of two similar killings in Johannesburg, South Africa, and two each in Geneva, Switzerland, and Germany. None of these murders were ever solved.

Doubt still exists whether Brydges was actually the killer or not. In contrast to Dosi's investigations, he did not speak Italian and did not have the necessary vehicle to commit the crimes, and witnesses gave conflicting descriptions of the supposed killer. He also had an alibi for at least one of the murders, as he was on vacation in northern Italy at the time. While Dosi's research indicated that he was a child molester, it did not conclusively prove that Brydges himself was the elusive Monster of Rome.

== Life after Rome ==
Brydges' active ministry continued; he was priest in charge of the Anglican congregation at San Jose, Costa Rica from 1929 to 1932, then British Chaplain at Utrecht, Netherlands in 1933-1934 but served no further positions after that.

Brydges died on 18 April 1946 in Daytona Beach, Florida. For unclear reasons, some newspapers' reports have incorrectly stated that Brydges had been arrested and subsequently executed for the crime he reportedly committed in South Africa.

== See also ==
- List of serial killers by country
- List of unsolved murders (1900–1979)
