= Pasiano di Pordenone =

Pasiano di Pordenone Pasiàn
- Comune
- Comune di Pasiano di Pordenone
- Coat of arms

- Location within Italy Location within Friuli-Venezia Giulia
- Coordinates: 45°51′N 12°38′E
- Country: Italy
- Region: Friuli-Venezia Giulia
- Province: Pordenone (PN)
- Frazioni: Cecchini, Rivarotta, Sant'Andrea, Azzanello, Visinale

Government
  - Mayor: Marta Amadio

Area
  - Total: 45.5 km^{2} (17.6 sq mi)
- Elevation: 13 m (43 ft)

Population (April 2009)
  - Total: 7,975
  - Density: 175/km^{2} (454/sq mi)
- Demonym: Pasianesi
- Time zone: UTC+1 (CET)
  - Summer (DST): UTC+2 (CEST)
- Postal code: 33087
- Dialing code: 0434
- Website: Official website

Pasiano di Pordenone (Venetian: Pasiàn; Friulian: Pasian di Pordenon) is a comune (municipality) in the Regional decentralization entity of Pordenone, in the Italian region of Friuli-Venezia Giulia, located about 90 kilometres (56 mi) northwest of Trieste and about 13 kilometres (8 mi) south of Pordenone.

== Geography ==
Pasiano borders the following municipalities: Azzano Decimo, Gorgo al Monticano, Mansuè, Meduna di Livenza, Porcia, Pordenone, Prata di Pordenone, Pravisdomini.

== International relations ==
=== Twin towns — sister cities ===
Pasiano di Pordenone is twinned with:

- Canton de Fronsac, France

== People ==
- Damiano Damiani (1922–2013), Italian screenwriter, film director, actor and writer
