= I Am Afraid =

1977 Italian crime-drama film directed by Damiano Damiani

- Theatrical release poster
- Directed by: Damiano Damiani
- Screenplay by: Nicola Badalucco; Damiano Damiani
- Story by: Nicola Badalucco; Damiano Damiani
- Produced by: Luigi De Laurentiis; Aurelio De Laurentiis
- Starring: Gian Maria Volonté; Erland Josephson; Mario Adorf; Angelica Ippolito
- Cinematography: Luigi Kuveiller
- Edited by: Antonio Siciliano
- Music by: Riz Ortolani
- Production company: Auro Cinematografica
- Distributed by: Cinema International Corporation
- Release date: 6 October 1977 (Italy)
- Running time: 119 minutes
- Country: Italy
- Box office: ₤1.708 billion

I Am Afraid (Italian: Io ho paura) is an Italian crime film directed by Damiano Damiani.

== Cast ==
- Gian Maria Volonté as Brigadeer Lodovico Graziano
- Mario Adorf as Judge Moser
- Erland Josephson as Judge Cancedda
- Angelica Ippolito as Gloria
- Giorgio Cerioni as Major Masseria
- Rino Sentieri as Tognon
- Bruno Corazzari: Captain La Rosa
- Paolo Malco as Caligari
- Laura Trotter as Caligari's girlfriend
- Aldo Valletti as Prison governor
- Laura De Marchi as Elsa Maroni

== Production ==
I Am Afraid was shot at Auro Cinematografica in Rome and on location in Rome.

== Release ==
I Am Afraid was released theatrically in Italy on 6 October 1977 where it was distributed by C.I.C. It grossed a total of 1,708,460,918 Italian lira on its domestic release. The film was shown at the 1977 Taormina Film Fest.

== Footnotes ==
=== References ===
- Curti, Roberto (2013). Italian Crime Filmography, 1968-1980. McFarland. ISBN 978-0786469765.
