= The Empty Canvas =

1963 film by Damiano Damiani

- Italian film poster
- Italian: La noia
- Directed by: Damiano Damiani
- Screenplay by: Damiano Damiani; Tonino Guerra; Ugo Liberatore
- Based on: La noia by Alberto Moravia
- Produced by: Carlo Ponti
- Starring: Horst Buchholz; Catherine Spaak; Bette Davis; Isa Miranda; Lea Padovani; Georges Wilson; Daniela Rocca
- Cinematography: Roberto Gerardi
- Edited by: Renzo Lucidi
- Music by: Luis Bacalov
- Production companies: Compagnia Cinematografica Champion; Les Films Concordia
- Distributed by: Interfilm
- Release date: 4 December 1963
- Running time: 105 minutes
- Country: Italy
- Languages: Italian; English

The Empty Canvas (Italian: La noia, lit. 'Boredom') is a 1963 Italian drama film directed by Damiano Damiani. The screenplay written by Damiani, Tonino Guerra and Ugo Liberatore is based on the eponymous best-selling novel by Alberto Moravia. The film stars Horst Buchholz, Catherine Spaak, Isa Miranda and Bette Davis.

== Synopsis ==
Mediocre artist Dino is obsessed with young model Cecilia and distraught that she shares her sexual favors with him as well as with actor Luciani. In an effort to derail her plan to vacation in Capri with his rival, Dino proposes marriage, and when Cecilia rejects his offer, he invites her to join him at the Rome estate of his domineering mother, a wealthy American, so that he can seduce her with his glamorous lifestyle. Despairing that he will never have a monogamous relationship with her, Dino crashes his sportscar into a wall. While recovering in the hospital, he realizes that his feelings will never be reciprocated. When Cecilia returns from her trip assuming their liaison will continue, Dino announces that the affair is over.

== Cast ==
- Horst Buchholz - Dino
- Catherine Spaak - Cecilia
- Bette Davis - Dino's Mother
- Isa Miranda - Cecilia's Mother
- Lea Padovani - Balestrieri's Widow
- Daniela Rocca - Rita
- Georges Wilson - Cecilia's Father
- Leonida Repaci - Balestrieri
- Luigi Giuliani - Luciani
- Daniela Calvino - Prostitute
- Marcella Rovena - Tenant

== Production credits ==
- Produced by Carlo Ponti, Joseph E. Levine
- Original music by Luis Enríquez Bacalov
- Cinematography by Roberto Gerardi
- Art direction by Carlo Egidi

== Release ==
The film was shot with the principal actors speaking English and was dubbed into Italian for its release in Italy as La noia (Boredom). In France, the film was titled L'ennui et sa diversion, l'érotisme (Boredom and Its Diversion, Eroticism).

A version of the film with its original English audio track was released in the United States by Embassy Pictures in 1964 as The Empty Canvas.

== Reception ==
In his review in The New York Times, Howard Thompson observed that "under Damiano Damiani's studied direction, the incidents move in stilted, crabwise fashion ... Miss Davis ... is truly a sight, looking like a Pekingese under a blonde bob and growling an atrocious Southern accent ... At times, especially under-scored by Miss Davis's withering expression and lava lingo, the picture's overripe sexuality is downright funny."

Time magazine called the film "one of those 'international' movie projects that appears to have been dreamed up by its principals ... in a spirit of reckless unity ... It is chiefly notable for the fun of watching Davis breast the New Wave plot with bitchy authority ... Stretched too far to be believable, Canvas is the kind of overdrawn foolishness that frequently proves diverting."

== See also ==
- L'Ennui (1998)
