= A Man on His Knees =

- Directed by: Damiano Damiani
- Produced by: Mario Cecchi Gori
- Cinematography: Ennio Guarnieri
- Music by: Franco Mannino
- Release date: 1979
- Country: Italy
- Language: Italian

Un uomo in ginocchio (internationally released as A Man on His Knees) is a 1979 Italian crime-drama film directed by Damiano Damiani. For his performance Giuliano Gemma won the Grolla d'oro for Best Actor.

== Cast ==
- Giuliano Gemma: Nino Peralta
- Michele Placido: Platamona
- Eleonora Giorgi: Peralta's wife
- Tano Cimarosa: Colicchia
- Ettore Manni: Don Vincenzo Fabbricante
- Luciano Catenacci: Policeman
- Nello Pazzafini: Patranka
- Nazzareno Zamperla
