= Flatfoot in Hong Kong =

- Directed by: Steno
- Written by: Lucio De Caro; Steno; Franco Verucci
- Starring: Bud Spencer
- Cinematography: Giuseppe Ruzzolini
- Edited by: Mario Morra
- Music by: Maurizio de Angelis; Guido de Angelis
- Release date: 1975
- Running time: 108 minutes
- Country: Italy
- Languages: Italian; English

Flatfoot in Hong Kong (Italian: Piedone a Hong Kong and also known as Flatfoot Goes East and Le Cogneur) is a 1975 crime comedy film directed by Steno and starring Bud Spencer. It is the second film of the "Flatfoot" film series. It is preceded by Flatfoot and followed by Flatfoot in Africa and Flatfoot in Egypt.

== Plot ==
The police prepares to trap the Drug Lord of Naples. The plan fails and Rizzo (Bud Spencer) decides to interrogate him for the last time, but when he arrives, he finds the Drug Lord murdered. Rizzo is accused of the murder and decides to investigate the arrival of an Italian-American Mafia member, Frank Barella (Al Lettieri). The information given by Barella and Ferramenti (Dominic Barto) makes Rizzo believe that there is a rat in the police department, and, therefore, he must go to the Far East to find out who he is. On his way through Thailand, Hong Kong and Macau, Rizzo encounters Barella, and this leads him to believe who is the corrupt police senior.

== Cast ==
- Bud Spencer as Insp. "Flatfoot" Rizzo
- Al Lettieri as Frank Barella
- Robert Webber as Sam Accardo
- Enzo Cannavale as brigadiere Caputo
- Nancy Sit as Makiko
- Francesco De Rosa as Goldhand
- Renato Scarpa as Insp. Morabito

=== Additional Stunt Crew ===
- Addy Sung as Peking Opera Thug (uncredited)
- Hoi Sang Lee as Peking Opera Thug (uncredited)
- Lau Hok Min as Peking Opera Thug (uncredited)
- Jackie Chan as Peking Opera Thug (uncredited)
- Alan Chui Chung-San as Casino Police Informer (uncredited)
- Chu Tiet Wo as Casino Police Informer (uncredited)
- Poon Kin Kwan as Peking Opera Thug (uncredited)
- Tai San as Peking Opera Thug (uncredited)
- Tony Leung Siu Hung as Peking Opera thug (uncredited)
- Lee Fat Yuen as Peking Opera thug (uncredited)
