= Arturo's Island (film) =

1962 film

- Directed by: Damiano Damiani
- Cinematography: Roberto Gerardi
- Music by: Nino Rota; Carlo Rustichelli
- Release date: 1962
- Country: Italy
- Language: Italian

L'isola di Arturo (internationally released as Arturo's Island) is a 1962 Italian drama film directed by Damiano Damiani. It is based on the novel with the same name written by Elsa Morante. The film won the Golden Shell at the San Sebastián International Film Festival.

== Plot ==
Arturo, a 14-year-old boy, confined to the insular life of Procida, a small island in the Gulf of Naples, is left to his own devices after being orphaned by his mother and seldom visited by his distant father, Wilhelm. Wilhelm, preoccupied with his frequent travels, returns one day with Nunziata, a 17-year-old he recently married in Naples, bringing along their child, Carmine.

Amidst this family dynamic, Arturo develops feelings for Nunziata, culminating in an ill-fated kiss. Rejected, he turns his attention to Teresa, a bold woman whose husband is believed to have emigrated to Australia.

Simultaneously, Wilhelm, indifferent to his family, unveils a dubious connection to Tonino Stella, a prisoner in the local jail. Tonino exploits Wilhelm's interests for the money owed to him due to a mistake that landed Tonino in prison. Desperate to fulfill his promise, Wilhelm orchestrated Tonino's transfer to the Procida prison, even pledging him a cruise.

Arturo discovers that Wilhelm's prolonged absences were not far from Procida, shattering the image of his father as a courageous man. Upon Tonino's release, he manipulates Wilhelm, beating and robbing him before their final parting. Nunziata, rejecting Arturo once more, takes charge to rebuild a tranquil future for her family.

Matured by these harsh experiences, Arturo decides to leave the island permanently after turning sixteen. During his journey, he painfully contemplates forgetting his father as a distant memory but acknowledges that Nunziata will remain unforgettable. He reflects that although she may not be extraordinary, her memory will persist, and any future love he encounters will feel like it's taken from her.

== Cast ==
- Vanni De Maigret: Arturo
- Key Meersman: Nunziata
- Reginald Kernan: Wilhelm
- Gabriella Giorgelli: Teresa
