= Al Lettieri =

American actor (1928–1975)

- Lettieri as Virgil Sollozzo in The Godfather
- Born: Alfredo Anthony Lettieri; February 24, 1928; New York City, U.S.
- Died: October 18, 1975 (aged 47); New York City, U.S.
- Other name: Anthony Lettier
- Occupation: Actor
- Years active: 1958–1975
- Relatives: Thomas Eboli (brother-in-law)

Alfredo Anthony Lettieri (February 24, 1928 – October 18, 1975) was an American actor and screenwriter. Active during the 1960s and 1970s, he commonly portrayed villainous characters. Lettieri achieved recognition for his performance as mobster Virgil Sollozzo in the crime film The Godfather (1972), and appeared in several other productions alongside Hollywood's biggest screen stars.

== Early life ==
An Italian-American from New York City, Lettieri was fluent in Sicilian and Italian. His brother-in-law was Pasquale Eboli, brother of Genovese crime family boss Thomas Eboli.

== Career ==
Lettieri, credited as "Anthony Lettier,” had a role in the 1958 Perry Mason episode "The Case of the Fugitive Nurse" as Arthur Strome. At the age of 36, he had a role in the television film The Hanged Man (1964).

Before his notable film roles materialized, Lettieri worked as a dialogue coach on five productions, including the 1968 wartime classic Where Eagles Dare. He was credited variously as "Alfredo Lettieri" and "Al Lettier" during this phase of his career.

Lettieri is best known for his role as Sicilian heroin trafficker Virgil Sollozzo in the 1972 American crime film The Godfather. In his 2024 autobiography, Al Pacino describes how Lettieri took him to visit a suburban New York family that resembled the Corleones after telling him, “You should meet this guy. It's good for what you're doing”. Pacino concluded, "Little Al knew some guys. Some real guys. And now he was introducing me to one of them." This was the second film in which Lettieri and Marlon Brando worked together, the first being The Night of the Following Day (1969).

He wrote the film adaptation that became the screenplay for the 1971 gangster movie Villain, which starred Richard Burton and Ian McShane. Lettieri played the brutal, libidinous henchman Rudy Butler in Steve McQueen's 1972 action film The Getaway, and the menacing hit man Frank Renda in the 1974 Charles Bronson film Mr. Majestyk.

In 1975, he went to Italy to co-star in the Bud Spencer comedy Flatfoot in Hong Kong. He appeared in two more Italian films, Go Gorilla Go (1976) with Fabio Testi, and top-billed in the Pupi Avati-directed House of Pleasure for Women (1976). He was cast in the lead of Mario Bava's crime thriller Rabid Dogs, but was let go three days into principal photography, after showing up on the set intoxicated.

== Death ==
Lettieri died of a heart attack in New York City on October 18, 1975 at the age of 47.

== Filmography ==
Year	Title	Role	Notes
1964	The Hanged Man	Al	TV movie
1965	Wild Seed	Bartender	a.k.a. Fargo (as Anthony Lettier)
1965	Dark Intruder	2nd Sergeant	TV movie, a.k.a. Black Cloak (as Anthony Lettier)
1966	After the Fox		(as Anthony Lettier)
1967	The Bobo	Eugenio Gomez	
1969	The Night of the Following Day	Pilot Al	(as Al Lettier, though is also listed on the credits as Alfredo Letteri, associate producer)
1971	A Town Called Bastard	La Bomba	
1971	Villain		screenplay adaptation
1972	The Godfather	Virgil "The Turk" Sollozzo	
1972	Pulp	Miller	
1972	Footsteps	Zimmerman	TV movie
1972	The Getaway	Rudy Butler	
1973	The Don Is Dead	Vince Fargo	a.k.a. Beautiful But Deadly, a.k.a. The Deadly Kiss
1973	The Deadly Trackers	Gutierrez, Mexican Policeman	
1974	McQ	Manny Santiago	
1974	Mr. Majestyk	Frank Renda	
1975	Flatfoot in Hong Kong	Frank Barella	a.k.a. Flatfoot Goes East, a.k.a. Flatfoot in Hong Kong
1975	Winner Take All	Man at Track	Episode: "Time Lock"
1976	A Likely Story	Kosak	
1976	Go Gorilla Go	Ciro Musante	
1976	House of Pleasure for Women	Eddie Mordace	
