= Distant Lights (1987 film) =

- Directed by: Aurelio Chiesa
- Cinematography: Renato Tafuri
- Music by: Angelo Branduardi
- Release date: 1987
- Language: Italian

Distant Lights (Italian: Luci lontane) is a 1987 Italian science fiction-thriller film written and directed by Aurelio Chiesa. It is based on the Giuseppe Pederiali's novel Venivano dalle stelle (They came from the stars).

== Cast ==
- Tomas Milian: Bernardo Bernardi
- Laura Morante: Renata
- William Berger: Dr. Montanari
- Giacomo Piperno: Chief of Police
- Susanna Martinkova: Silvia Bernardi
- Clara Colosimo
