= Meduna di Livenza =

- Comune
- Comune di Meduna di Livenza
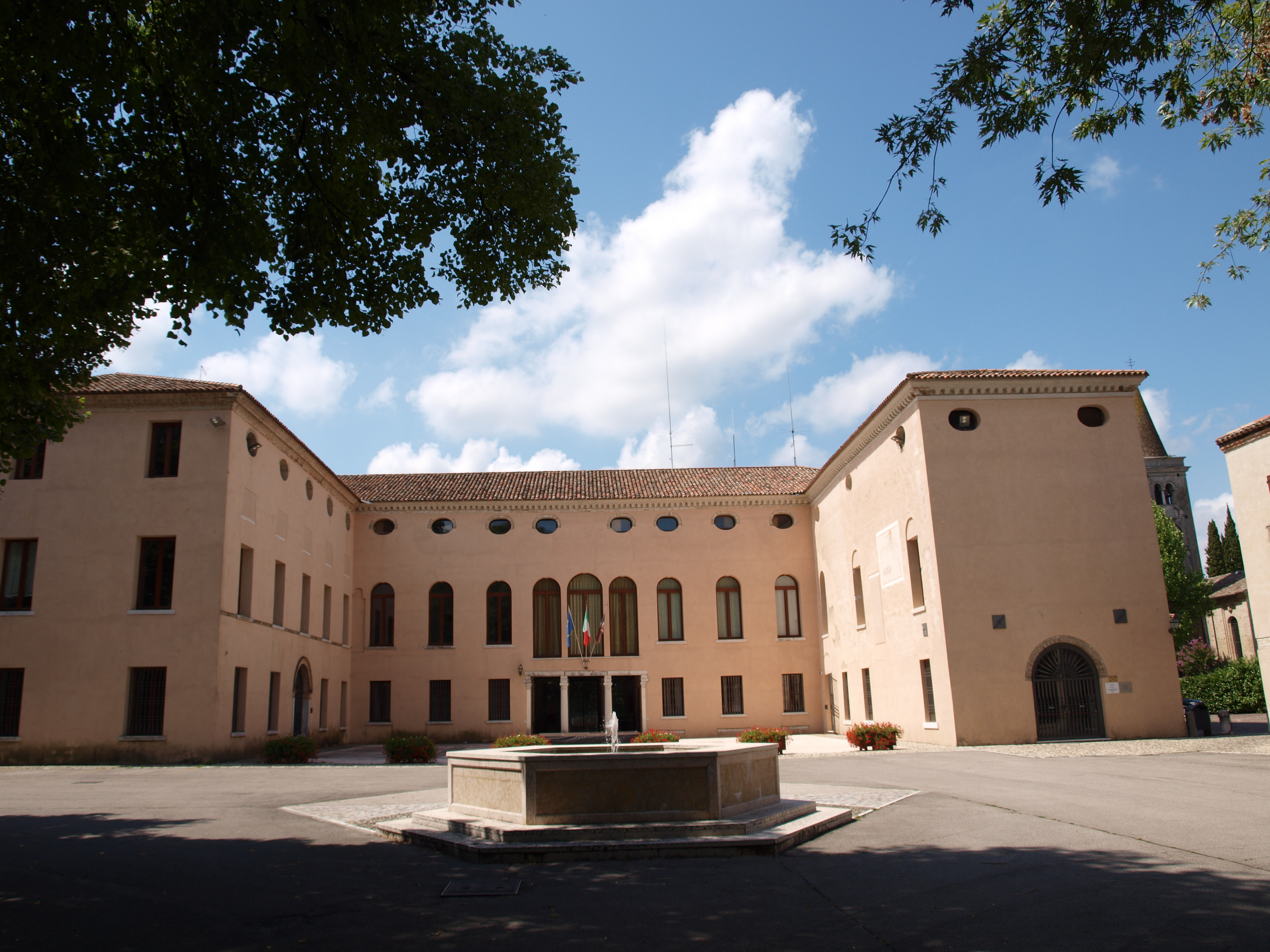
- Town hall

- Coat of arms

- Location within Italy Location within Veneto
- Coordinates: 45°48′N 12°37′E
- Country: Italy
- Region: Veneto
- Province: Treviso (TV)
- Frazioni: Brische, Mure

Government
  - Mayor: Arnaldo Stefano Pitton

Area
  - Total: 15.1 km^{2} (5.8 sq mi)
- Elevation: 8 m (26 ft)

Population (31 December 2015)
  - Total: 2,930
  - Density: 194/km^{2} (503/sq mi)
- Demonym: Medunesi
- Time zone: UTC+1 (CET)
  - Summer (DST): UTC+2 (CEST)
- Postal code: 31040
- Dialing code: 0422
- Patron saint: St. John the Baptist
- Website: Official website

Meduna di Livenza is a comune (municipality) in the province of Treviso, in the Italian region of Veneto, located about 45 kilometres (28 mi) northeast of Venice and about 30 kilometres (19 mi) northeast of Treviso.

Meduna di Livenza borders the following municipalities: Annone Veneto, Gorgo al Monticano, Motta di Livenza, Pasiano di Pordenone, Pravisdomini.

It is the origin of the toponymic surname Meduna.
