= A Complicated Girl =

- Italian film poster
- Directed by: Damiano Damiani
- Screenplay by: Damiano Damiani; Alberto Silvestri; Franco Verucci
- Based on: "La marcia indietro" by Alberto Moravia
- Produced by: Giorgio Agliani
- Starring: Catherine Spaak; Jean Sorel; Florinda Bolkan; Gigi Proietti; Gabriella Boccardo; María Cuadra
- Cinematography: Roberto Gerardi
- Edited by: Antonietta Zita
- Music by: Fabio Fabor
- Production company: Filmena
- Distributed by: D.C.I.
- Release date: 1968
- Running time: 100 minutes
- Country: Italy
- Language: Italian

A Complicated Girl (Italian: Una ragazza piuttosto complicata) is a 1968 Italian giallo film directed by Damiano Damiani. For her performance in this film and in Metti una sera a cena, Florinda Bolkan was awarded with a Golden Plate at the 1968 Edition of David di Donatello.

== Plot ==
A man plugs into a phone call between two lesbian lovers. Intrigued by the very special situation, he decides to know one of the two girls to become his lover. Problems arise when the other woman seeks to end their relationship.

== Cast ==
- Catherine Spaak as Claudia
- Florinda Bolkan as Greta
- Jean Sorel as Alberto
- Gigi Proietti as Pietro
- Luciano Catenacci
- Gabriella Grimaldi as Viola
- María Cuadra as Marina
