= Macbeth (1987 film) =

1987 film

- Directed by: Claude d'Anna
- Written by: Claude d'Anna; Francesco Maria Piave; William Shakespeare
- Produced by: Henry Lange
- Starring: Leo Nucci
- Cinematography: Pierre Dupouey
- Music by: Giuseppe Verdi
- Release date: 18 May 1987
- Running time: 133 minutes
- Country: France
- Language: Italian

Macbeth is a 1987 French film of Verdi's opera Macbeth (libretto by Francesco Maria Piave based on Shakespeare's play). Directed by Claude d'Anna, it was screened out of competition at the 1987 Cannes Film Festival.

== Cast ==
- Leo Nucci as Macbeth
- Shirley Verrett as Lady Macbeth
- Samuel Ramey as Banco (voice)
- Johan Leysen as Banco
- Veriano Luchetti as Macduff (voice)
- Philippe Volter as Macduff
- Antonio Barasorda as Malcolm
- Anna Caterina Antonacci as Dama
- Sergio Fontana as Medico
- Gianfranco Casarini as Domestico
- Gastone Sarti as Sicario (voice)
- Giuseppe Morresi as Araldo
- Natale De Carolis as Prima apparizione (voice)
- Marco Fanti as Terza apparizione (voice)
