= La ragazza del prete =

- Directed by: Domenico Paolella
- Cinematography: Claudio Ragona
- Music by: Gian Franco Reverberi; Gian Piero Reverberi
- Release date: 1970
- Running time: 100 minute
- Country: Italy
- Language: Italian

La ragazza del prete (The girlfriend of the priest) is a 1970 Italian romantic comedy film directed by Domenico Paolella.

== Cast ==
- Nicola Di Bari: Don Michele / Nicola
- Susanna Martinková: Erika
- Isabella Biagini: Maria Innocenza Furlan
- Mario Carotenuto: Cardinal Mimì
- Toni Ucci: "Giaguaro"
- Gisella Sofio: Antonella
- Umberto D'Orsi: Commissario Pieretti
- Antonella Steni: De Magistris
- Giacomo Furia: Il sacrestano
- Fiorenzo Fiorentini
- Hélène Chanel
- Tuccio Musumeci
- Elio Crovetto
