= The Case Is Closed, Forget It =

- Italian film poster
- Directed by: Damiano Damiani
- Screenplay by: Dino Maiuri; Massimo De Rita; Damiano Damiani
- Based on: Tante Sbarre by Leros Pittoni
- Produced by: Mario Cecchi Gori
- Starring: Franco Nero; Riccardo Cucciolla
- Cinematography: Claudio Ragona
- Edited by: Antonio Siciliano
- Music by: Ennio Morricone
- Production company: Fair Film
- Distributed by: Interfilm
- Release date: 1971
- Running time: 106 minutes
- Country: Italy
- Language: Italian

The Case Is Closed, Forget It (Italian: L'istruttoria è chiusa: dimentichi) is a 1971 Italy crime drama film directed by Damiano Damiani.

It is based on the novel Tante Sbarre (trad. "Many Bars"), written by Leros Pittoni. It was awarded at the Tehran Film Festival.

== Cast ==
- Franco Nero: Vanzi
- Georges Wilson: Campoloni
- John Steiner: Biro
- Riccardo Cucciolla: Pesenti
- Ferruccio De Ceresa: Warden
- Turi Ferro: Chef of Prison Guards
- Luigi Zerbinati: Zagarella
- Enzo Andronico: Pesenti's lawyer
- Claudio Nicastro: Salvatore Rosa
- Corrado Solari: Crotta
- Damiano Damiani: Vanzi's lawyer
- Patrizia Adiutori: Milena
