= Gorgo al Monticano =

- Comune
- Comune di Gorgo al Monticano
- Coat of arms

- Location within Italy Location within Veneto
- Coordinates: 45°44′N 12°35′E
- Country: Italy
- Region: Veneto
- Province: Treviso (TV)
- Frazioni: Navolé, Cavalier

Government
  - Mayor: Giannina Cover

Area
  - Total: 27.1 km^{2} (10.5 sq mi)
- Elevation: 9 m (30 ft)

Population (31 August 2017)
  - Total: 4,117
  - Density: 152/km^{2} (393/sq mi)
- Time zone: UTC+1 (CET)
  - Summer (DST): UTC+2 (CEST)
- Postal code: 31040
- Dialing code: 0422
- Website: Official website

Gorgo al Monticano is a comune (municipality) in the province of Treviso, in the Italian region of Veneto, located about 40 kilometres (25 mi) northeast of Venice and about 25 kilometres (16 mi) northeast of Treviso.

Gorgo al Monticano borders the following municipalities: Chiarano, Mansuè, Meduna di Livenza, Motta di Livenza, Oderzo, Pasiano di Pordenone.
