= Mr. Majestyk =

1974 film by Richard Fleischer

- Theatrical release poster
- Directed by: Richard Fleischer
- Written by: Elmore Leonard
- Produced by: Walter Mirisch
- Starring: Charles Bronson; Al Lettieri; Linda Cristal; Lee Purcell
- Cinematography: Richard H. Kline
- Edited by: Ralph E. Winters
- Music by: Charles Bernstein
- Production company: The Mirisch Corporation
- Distributed by: United Artists
- Release date: July 12, 1974
- Running time: 103 minutes
- Country: United States
- Language: English

Mr. Majestyk is a 1974 American neo-Western action thriller film directed by Richard Fleischer and written by Elmore Leonard. Charles Bronson stars as the title character, Vince Majestyk, a farmer and Vietnam War veteran who gets in a conflict with racist thugs and a mafia hitman who want to destroy his watermelon farm in rural Colorado. Leonard, who wrote the film with an original screenplay, took the name Majestyk from a character in his 1969 crime novel The Big Bounce. He would also write the novelization of the film.

== Plot ==
Vince Majestyk is a farmer, and a former U.S. Army Ranger instructor and Vietnam War veteran, who owns and operates a 160-acre watermelon farm in rural Colorado near a small town called Edna. He needs to harvest his crop soon in order to keep the farm financially solvent.

A small-time hood, Bobby Kopas, attempts to coerce Majestyk into a protection racket of using unskilled drunks to harvest his watermelon crop. Majestyk runs him off with Kopas' own shotgun and hires experienced Mexican migrant workers, including Nancy Chavez, a crop picker who is also a union organizer. Kopas brings assault charges against Majestyk, resulting in the farmer being placed under arrest before he can finish the harvest.

In jail, Majestyk meets and annoys Frank Renda, a notorious mob hit man being transferred to a higher-security prison. Renda's men try to break him out of police custody during a prisoner transport by bus. In the escape attempt, Majestyk drives off in the bus with Renda still in handcuffs, eventually taking him to his hunting cabin in the nearby foothills. Majestyk hopes to trade Renda to the police in return for being released to finish harvesting his melons. Renda offers his captor $25,000 for his freedom, but Majestyk declines. Renda then threatens to kill Majestyk if he doesn't release him, and Majestyk pretends to be persuaded to take the money, but contacts both the police and Renda's Mafia contacts to come pick them up.

Wiley, Renda's girlfriend, arrives and they manage to turn the tables on Majestyk, although he is able to escape. Renda learns the charges for which he had been imprisoned have been dropped due to the only witness, a police officer, being killed during the jailbreak. Renda meets up with his right-hand man, Gene Lundy, who advises him to fly to Mazatlán, Mexico, and enjoy himself; Renda will have none of it, as he wants to get revenge on Majestyk. He arranges for Kopas to drop the assault charges against Majestyk, and orders his men to find the "melon picker" so he can have the personal satisfaction of killing him.

The men arrive at the farm to kill Majestyk, but not finding him, they instead machine-gun the melons and rough up the hired hands, forcing them to depart. That same night, as Majestyk and Nancy have a drink at a bar in town, Renda approaches and tells him he plans to kill him. Instead of being intimidated, Majestyk punches Renda in the mouth and knocks him down, telling him to "call the cops", further infuriating Renda. The next day, Lundy uses his car to break the legs of Majestyk's friend and foreman, Larry Mendoza, as he tries to deliver a load of melons, putting him in the hospital.

Renda and his men surround Majestyk's home, but Majestyk gets away in the back of a pickup truck driven by Nancy, and a prolonged car chase ensues. The police set up roadblocks and launch a helicopter hoping to find them. Luring Renda and his men into the foothills, Majestyk turns the tables on them and becomes the attacker, killing most of Renda's men during the pursuit. Realizing they are now the hunted, Renda retreats to their lodge hideout where he, Wiley, Lundy, and Kopas hole up. Renda sends Wiley outside to negotiate with Majestyk, hoping to force him to show himself, but Majestyk sends her away with Nancy. After removing the keys from their vehicle, Majestyk then assaults the cabin, killing Lundy after Renda sacrifices him to save himself. Disgusted, Kopas decides to leave when he realizes Renda will also sacrifice him to get to Majestyk. With Kopas' help, Majestyk gets the drop on Renda and kills him. The police soon arrive and arrest Kopas and Wiley. Majestyk tells Lieutenant Johnny McAllen, "You were right, lieutenant. He was really trying to kill me," before driving away in the pickup with Nancy.

== Cast ==
- Charles Bronson as Vincent "Vince" Majestyk
- Al Lettieri as Frank Renda
- Linda Cristal as Nancy Chavez
- Lee Purcell as Wiley
- Paul Koslo as Bobby Kopas
- Taylor Lacher as Gene Lundy
- Frank Maxwell as Sheriff Detective Lieutenant John "Johnny" McAllen
- Alejandro Rey as Larry Mendoza

== Production ==
=== Filming ===
The movie was filmed on location in La Junta, Colorado, Cañon City, Colorado, Rocky Ford, Colorado, and Manzanola, Colorado. Los Angeles Times press on the film reported that production moved to Colorado, due to Bronson's availability falling outside California's melon-growing season. Production offered a Manzanola farmer with an 160-acre Rocky Ford melon ranch a $3,500 location fee, but the farmer insisted on $10,000 due to local publicity of the film.

== Release ==
=== Marketing ===
The Ford Motor Company used scenes licensed from the movie showing extreme driving of Vince Majestyk (Charles Bronson)'s 1968 Ford F-100 pickup truck during commercials for its 1976 Ford trucks.

=== Home media ===
The film was first released to DVD in 2003 by MGM/UA on a dual-sided disc that contained both the Widescreen and Standard versions. On the back cover there is a picture of Bronson holding a shotgun with a cigarette in his mouth. Although Bronson smoked in real life, his character in the movie smoked only once, indicating that this may be an outtake or publicity still. The picture is missing from the back cover of Kino Lorber's Blu-ray release for 2021, but is still there on the 2014 bare-bones release.

=== Legacy ===
The film has become a cult film following its reference in the Quentin Tarantino-penned 1993 Tony Scott romantic crime film True Romance.

== Reception ==
=== Critical response ===
The movie was popular with Bronson action film enthusiasts. Howard Thompson of The New York Times said, "Except for some dutiful splattering of gore, it ticks along rather steadily, under Richard Fleischer's unruffled direction. There is a take-it-or-leave-it air that snugly suits the star's performance, or vice versa." The scene in which Nancy Chavez (Linda Cristal) and Majestyk drive away in a pickup truck with Frank Renda (Al Lettieri)'s men in hot pursuit became one of the most famous chase sequences of the period, following the recent trend of those in Bullitt (1968) and The French Connection (1971).

On Rotten Tomatoes, the film holds an 84% rating based on 19 reviews. Metacritic, which uses a weighted average, assigned the film a score of 55 out of 100, based on 8 critics, indicating "mixed or average reviews".

== See also ==
- List of American films of 1974

== Sources ==
- 'Elmore Leonard Week: Elmore on Clint Eastwood, Bruce Willis, and William Friedkin', Contrappasso Magazine (Contrappasso #2, December 2012)
