= Susanna Martinková =

Czech actress (born 1946)

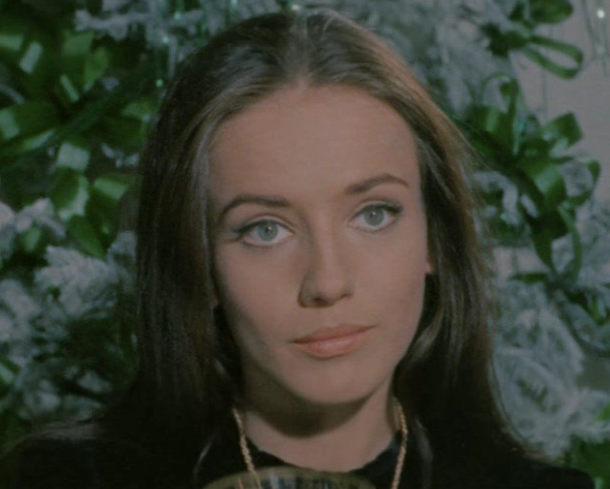
- Martinková in the movie Il ragazzo che sorride (1969)
- Born: Zuzana Martinková; 19 April 1946 (age 80); Prague, Czechoslovakia
- Occupations: Actress; winemaker
- Years active: 1957–present
- Spouse: Gianni Garko (m. 1973; div. 1986)

Zuzana "Susanna" Martinková (born 19 April 1946) is a Czech actress, mainly active in Italy.

Born in Prague, Czechoslovakia, Martinkova debuted at 16 as lead actress in Letos v zari (1963). After several film and stage appearances, in 1967 she moved to Italy to star in a war film directed by Carlo Lizzani, Sagapò, which eventually was cancelled. Later Martinkova starred in a number of films and television works, sometimes in main roles. She is now a winemaker.

== Partial filmography ==
- Letos v zari (1963) - Hanka Zemanová
- Strakatí andelé (1965) - Marie (segment "Jana")
- Kdyby tisíc klarinetu (1965) - Teacher #2
- Dva tygři (1966) - Jitka
- Who Wants to Kill Jessie? (1966) - Alena
- Granada, addio! (1967) - Paoletta
- Vengeance Is Mine (1967) - Mary
- May God Forgive You... But I Won't (1968) - Jane, Cjamango's sister (uncredited)
- Il ragazzo che sorride (1969) - Livia - Wife of Giorgio
- El 'Che' Guevara (1969) - Simona
- Detective Belli (1969) - Emmanuelle
- Taste of Vengeance (1969) - Brian's Bride (uncredited)
- The Syndicate: A Death in the Family (1970) - Fanny, la cieca
- La ragazza del prete (1970) - Erika
- Tajemství velikeho vypravece (1972)
- Prete, fai un miracolo (1975) - Isabel
- La principessa sul pisello (1976)
- Contronatura (1976)
- Il signor Ministro li pretese tutti e subito (1977) - Piera
- Il ladrone (1980) - Marta
- Notturno (1983) - Magdalena Rudinski
- Fracchia contro Dracula (1985) - Catarina
- Distant Lights (1988) - Silvia Bernardi
- Il ritorno del grande amico (1990)
- Frivolous Lola (1998) - Michelle
- Rivers of Babylon (1998) - Erzika
