= Motta di Livenza =

Motta di Livenza Mota de Łivensa (Venetian)
- Comune
- Città di Motta di Livenza
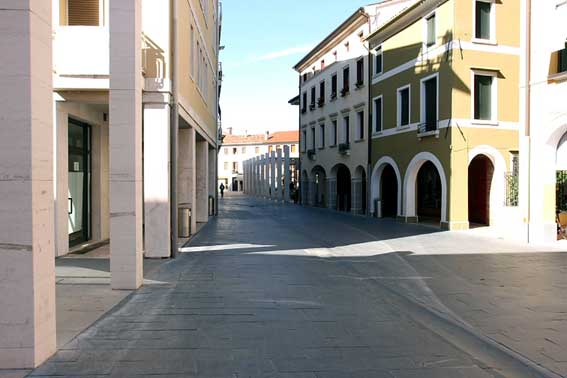

- Coat of arms

- Location within Italy Location within Veneto
- Coordinates: 45°46′47″N 12°36′31″E
- Country: Italy
- Region: Veneto
- Province: Treviso (TV)
- Frazioni: Lorenzaga, Malintrada, San Giovanni, Villanova

Government
  - Mayor: Alessandro Righi

Area
  - Total: 37.78 km^{2} (14.59 sq mi)
- Elevation: 7 m (23 ft)

Population (30 November 2017)
  - Total: 10,816
  - Density: 286.3/km^{2} (741.5/sq mi)
- Demonym: Mottensi
- Time zone: UTC+1 (CET)
  - Summer (DST): UTC+2 (CEST)
- Postal code: 31045
- Dialing code: 0422
- ISTAT code: 026049
- Patron saint: San Nicholas
- Saint day: 6 December
- Website: Official website

Motta di Livenza (Venetian: Mota de Łivensa or simply Mota) is a comune (municipality) in the province of Treviso, in the Italian region of Veneto.

Motta di Livenza borders the following municipalities: Annone Veneto, Cessalto, Chiarano, Gorgo al Monticano, Meduna di Livenza, San Stino di Livenza.

== International relations ==
=== Twin towns — sister cities ===
Motta di Livenza is twinned with:

- L'Isle-Jourdain, Gers, France
- Cres, Croatia
- Parakou, Benin
