= Salomè (1986 film) =

1986 film

- DVD cover
- Directed by: Claude d'Anna
- Screenplay by: Claude d'Anna; Aaron Barzman; Basilio Franchina
- Based on: Salome by Oscar Wilde
- Produced by: Yoram Globus; Menahem Golan
- Starring: Tomas Milian; Pamela Salem; Tim Woodward; Jo Champa
- Cinematography: Pasqualino De Santis
- Music by: Egisto Macchi
- Production companies: Cannon Group; Italian International Film; Dédalus
- Distributed by: Cannon Films
- Release dates: May 8, 1986 (Cannes); August 5, 1986 (Italy)
- Running time: 105 minutes
- Countries: Italy; France
- Language: English

Salomè is a 1986 Italian-French drama film directed by Claude d'Anna and starring Jo Champa. It is an adaptation of the 1891 play of the same name by Oscar Wilde, and was entered into the 1986 Cannes Film Festival, where it was shown as part of the Un Certain Regard section.

== Plot ==
While Jesus is preaching with his Apostles, the confessor John the Baptist is arrested by the king of Judea to the many defamatory sermons against the power of the monarchy. Herod Antipas, son of Herod the Great, imprisons John, and Princess Salomé, daughter of Herod, without him being aware of it, secretly falls in love with John the Baptist. But it is a corrupt and lustful love, which comes from lying insults that John turns to the corrupt family of Herod. When Herod, in the birthday of his daughter, asks to Salomè what gift she wants, Salomè says she wants to see the severed head of John. Herod is content, and so Salomè, when John is beheaded, performs the dance of the seven veils, and falls into sexual rapture, kissing full of the passion the mouth of the head. Herod, horrified, puts his daughter Salomè to death.

== Cast ==
- Tomas Milian as Herod
- Pamela Salem as Herodias
- Tim Woodward as Nerva
- Jo Champa as Salomé
  - Fabiana Torrente as Young Salomè
- Fabrizio Bentivoglio as Yokanaan
- Jean-François Stévenin as Aide-de-Camp
- Fabio Carfora as Narraboth
- Lorenzo Piani as Phillip
- Feodor Chaliapin, Jr. as Messenger
- Sergio Doria as Horseman
- Annie Edel as the Mother Goddess
- Johara Racz as Princess
- Paul Muller as Doctor
