= The Sicilian Connection =

- Italian film poster
- Directed by: Ferdinando Baldi
- Written by: Ferdinando Baldi; Duilio Coletti
- Produced by: Manolo Bolognini
- Starring: Ben Gazzara; Silvia Monti; Fausto Tozzi; Luciano Catenacci; Steffen Zacharias; Mario Pilar; Jess Hahn
- Cinematography: Aiace Parolin
- Edited by: Eugenio Alabiso
- Music by: Guido De Angelis; Maurizio De Angelis
- Production company: Produzioni Atlas Consorziate; Rewind Film; Societé Cinématographique Lyre
- Distributed by: Produzioni Atlas Consorziate (Italy)
- Release date: December 22, 1972 (Italy)
- Countries: Italy; France
- Language: Italian

The Sicilian Connection (Italian: Afyon oppio, (Note: ’Afyon’ is the Turkish word for opium, ‘oppio’ is the Italian word for the same.) also known as The Opium Connection) is a 1972 crime film directed and co-written by Ferdinando Baldi and starring Ben Gazzara, Silvia Monti, Fausto Tozzi and Jess Hahn. An Italian and French co-production, it is usually categorized as part of the poliziottesco trend of the 1970s.

== Plot ==
The Italian-American Joseph Coppola wants to start trafficking drugs from Turkey to the United States and calls for the support of the Sicilian Mafia, who would protect him from the Marseilles Clan. In the U.S., however, he appears to forget the chords. Greed or double play?

== Cast ==
- Ben Gazzara as Joseph Coppola
- Silvia Monti as Claudia
- Fausto Tozzi as Don Vincenzo
- Jess Hahn as Sacha
- Steffen Zacharias as Sally
- Luciano Catenacci as Tony Nicolodi
- Mario Pilar as Ibrahim
- Corrado Gaipa as Don Calogero
- José Greci as Lucia Calogero
- Malisa Longo as Rosalia Calogero
- Teodoro Corrà as Ciro
- Luciano Rossi as Hans
- Bruno Corazzari as Larry
- Carlo Gaddi as Albertini
- Giuseppe Castellano as Mike
- John Bartha as FBI Agent
- Yavuz Selekman
