= The Assassin of Rome =

- Directed by: Damiano Damiani
- Written by: Damiano Damiani; Fulvio Gicca Palli; Enrico Ribulsi
- Produced by: Dino De Laurentiis
- Starring: Nino Manfredi; Gabriele Lavia
- Cinematography: Marcello Gatti
- Edited by: Nino Baragli
- Music by: Riz Ortolani
- Release date: 1972
- Country: Italy
- Language: Italian

The Assassin of Rome (Italian: Girolimoni, il mostro di Roma) is a 1972 Italian historical drama film directed by Damiano Damiani. The film tells, with some historical licenses, the story of Gino Girolimoni, wrongfully accused of a series of child murders that occurred in Rome between 1924 and 1928.

== Cast ==
- Nino Manfredi as Gino Girolimoni
- Gabriele Lavia as Tarquinio Tirabosco
- Eleonora Morana as Armanda Tirabosco
- Orso Maria Guerrini as Gianni Di Meo
- Guido Leontini as Apicella
- Mario Carotenuto as Sterbini
- Laura De Marchi as The servant
- Luciano Catenacci as Benito Mussolini
- Arturo Dominici as Jaccarino
- Ennio Antonelli as The lover of the mother of 'Biocchetta'
- Nello Pazzafini as Fiaccarini
