= Claude d'Anna =

French film director

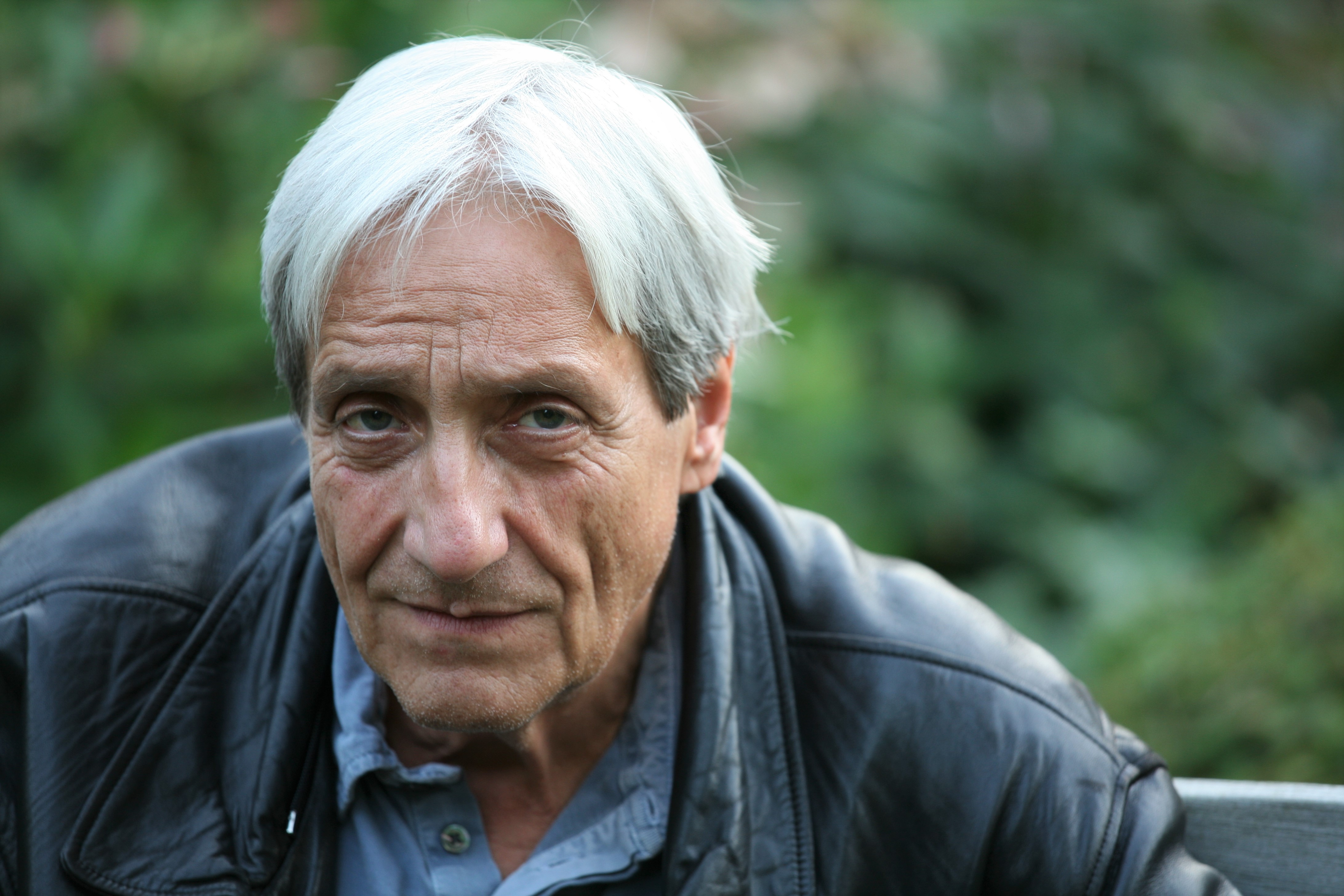
- Born: 31 March 1945 (age 81); France
- Occupations: Film director Screenwriter
- Years active: 1970-present

Claude d'Anna (born 31 March 1945) is a French film director and screenwriter. He has directed 16 films since 1970. His film Salome was screened in the Un Certain Regard section the 1986 Cannes Film Festival. A year later his film Macbeth would be screened out of competition at the 1987 Festival.

== Selected filmography ==
- L'Ordre et la sécurité du monde (1978)
- Le Cercle des passions (1983)
- Salome (1986)
- Macbeth (1987)
