= Roberto Gerardi =

Italian cinematographer

Roberto Gerardi (18 October 1919 – 1995) was an Italian cinematographer.

Born in Rome, Gerardi began his career as an assistant of Carlo Montuori, then pursued his career as an assistant operator of Anchise Brizzi, with whom he worked in one of the masterpieces of neorealism, Vittorio De Sica's Shoeshine. He made his debut as a cinematographer in 1957 with the film I colpevoli by Turi Vasile, in which he experienced an innovative camera system, with the simultaneous use of three cameras to frame different cuts of long shots.

After having accompanied Giuseppe Rotunno as an additional cinematographer in The Great War (1959), in the early sixties he worked in art films such as Damiano Damiani's Arturo's Island and The Empty Canvas, but also to international co-productions such as Madame Sans-Gene by Christian-Jaque and The Condemned of Altona by Vittorio De Sica. In the second half of the sixties Gerardi turned into literary adaptations such as Mademoiselle De Maupin by Mauro Bolognini and Don Giovanni in Sicilia by Alberto Lattuada. He was also pretty active in sophisticated commedia all'italiana films, in which he adopted a distinctive cinematography, characterized by "a brilliant use of color and light".

The seventies marked the beginning of the decline of his career, that started to be oriented to more popular and less ambitious productions; during these years he regularly worked with the directors Fernando Di Leo and Giorgio Capitani.
