= Confessions of a Police Captain =

1971 film by Damiano Damiani

- Italian film poster
- Italian: Confessione di un commissario di polizia al procuratore della repubblica
- Directed by: Damiano Damiani
- Screenplay by: Damiano Damiani; Salvatore Laurani
- Story by: Damiano Damiani; Fulvio Gicca Palli
- Produced by: Bruno Turchetto; Mario Montanari
- Starring: Franco Nero; Martin Balsam; Marilù Tolo
- Cinematography: Claudio Ragona
- Edited by: Antonio Siciliano
- Music by: Riz Ortolani
- Production companies: Euro International Films; Explorer Film '58
- Distributed by: Euro International Films
- Release date: 26 March 1971
- Running time: 101 minutes
- Country: Italy
- Language: Italian

Confessions of a Police Captain (Italian: Confessione di un commissario di polizia al procuratore della repubblica, lit. 'Confessions of a Police Commissioner to the State Prosecutor') is a 1971 Italian crime film co-written and directed by Damiano Damiani, and starring Franco Nero, Martin Balsam and Marilù Tolo.

The film won the Golden Prize at the 7th Moscow International Film Festival, and Damiano Damiani was nominated for the Nastro d'Argento for Best Director. The film also won Prix lntemational de l'Academie du Cinema at the Étoiles de cristal.

== Plot ==
In Palermo, police captain (commissario) Giacomo Bonavia arranges the release of a criminally insane prisoner, Michele Lipuma, who immediately sets about settling a score with a local construction magnate, Ferdinando Lomunno. As Bonavia follows Lipuma's initial movements, it becomes clear that Bonavia orchestrated his release for that outcome. Lipuma's attempt to kill Lomunno fails—Lomunno was tipped off somehow and left three gunmen in his place, all of whom, including Lipuma, end up dead.

D.A. Traini, energetic and idealistic, takes over the case and is informed by Bonavia of the stranglehold Lomunno has over the local construction industry, and how he and various government officials game the system for their own benefit. As the case unfolds, Traini realizes that Bonavia masterminded the events as intricately as any criminal, and vows to bring him down. Traini believes whole-heartedly in the system and its officials, refusing to accept corruption of any official, but is countered by Bonavia, who explains that all he has to do to derail Traini is muddy the water with slander.

Central to the overall case is the whereabouts of Lipuma's sister, Serena, who was once involved with Lomunno and privy to many of the conversations held between Lomunno and the government officials. As witnesses to Lomunno's activities tend to disappear, when Bonavia finds Serena, he puts her in a safe house known only to himself. Traini finally decides to start the prosecution of Bonavia, prompting Bonavia to write a full confession, including the murder of Lomunno, which he then commits while Traini is reading the confession. Bonavia immediately turns himself in, and when the arrest is mentioned on TV, Serena calls the courthouse to enquire...only to have Lomunno's thugs arrive at the safe house, claiming to be sent by the court. She is unceremoniously killed, encased in a concrete, and incorporated into a local construction project.

From prison, Bonavia questions whether Traini will investigate how Lomunno found out where Serena was hidden...as it was only after she contacted the courthouse...but Traini refuses to consider any possible collusion between parties. He reassures Bonavia that the system has integrity and will serve justice in the end. Bonavia responds that prison is a different world, and one where Traini holds no influence. Bonavia is duly killed in prison, eliminating the last 'loose thread'. With that, Traini realizes that the word could only have come from the Attorney-General himself, who smugly smiles and asks "Is something wrong?" when finally confronted.

== Cast ==
- Franco Nero as Deputy D.A. Traini
- Martin Balsam as Commissario Giacomo Bonavia
- Marilù Tolo as Serena Li Puma
- Claudio Gora as District Attorney Malta
- Luciano Catenacci as Ferdinando Lomunno ('Ferdinando Dubrosio' in the English dub)
- Giancarlo Prete as Giampaolo Rizzo
- Arturo Dominici as Canistraro
- Michele Gammino as Gammino
- Adolfo Lastretti as Michele Li Puma
- Nello Pazzafini as Prisoner
- Calisto Calisti as Calisto
- Adele Modica as Lina Paladino
- Roy Bosier as Giuseppe Lasciatelli
- Giancarlo Badessi as Grisì
- Filippo De Gara as Mayor Nicotra

== Releases ==
Wild East released this on a limited edition R0 NTSC DVD alongside The Summertime Killer in 2010. It was released on Blu-Ray by Radiance Films in April 2026.
