= A Bullet for the General =

1966 Italian film directed by Damiano Damiani

- Italian film poster
- Directed by: Damiano Damiani
- Written by: Salvatore Laurani
- Adaptation by: Franco Solinas
- Produced by: Bianco Manini
- Starring: Gian Maria Volonté; Klaus Kinski; Martine Beswick; Lou Castel; Jaime Fernández
- Cinematography: Antonio Secchi
- Edited by: Renato Cinquini
- Music by: Luis Bacalov
- Production company: MCM
- Release date: 2 December 1966 (Italy)
- Running time: 115 minutes
- Country: Italy
- Box office: £687.1 million

A Bullet for the General (original Italian title: Quién sabe?, which means "Who knows?" in the Spanish language), also known as El Chucho Quién Sabe?, is a 1966 Italian Zapata Western film directed by Damiano Damiani and starring Gian Maria Volonté, Lou Castel, Klaus Kinski and Martine Beswick. It tells the story of El Chuncho, a bandit and guerrilla leader during the Mexican Revolution, and Bill Tate/El Niño (The Kid), a counter-revolutionary contract killer who infiltrates his gang and befriends Chuncho. The story centers on the way this relationship changes everything for Chuncho, who discovers the hard way that a social revolution is more important than mere money.

== Plot ==
During the Mexican Revolution, a Durango-bound government munitions train is forced to stop due to the presence of a crucified federal army officer on the tracks. El Chuncho Muños, an arrogant gun runner and guerrilla figure who is loyal to the Zapatist revolutionary leader General Elías, leads his gang in an assault on the train. Lieutenant Alvaro Ferreira, who is commanding the rurales' escort of the train, attempts to save the officer, but after being fatally wounded by Chuncho he orders the train to run the captain and him over to escape the bandits. Bill Tate, a quiet and mysterious American passenger on the train, kills the engineer and stops the train again, allowing Chuncho and his gang to kill the remaining rurales and take their weapons. Posing as a former prisoner of the army, Tate joins the gang and is quickly befriended by Chuncho, who nicknames him "Niño".

After several heists, the gang travels to the town of San Miguel, where Chuncho meets with his old friend Raimundo to overthrow the weakhearted town boss, Don Felipe. Rosaria, Felipe's spirited wife, attempts to defend him; when Chuncho's men assault her, Tate angrily berates them for their behavior. Chuncho shoots Guapo, a gang member, for attempting to kill Tate during the discussion. Don Felipe is made to drive Chuncho and his gang back to San Miguel, and he is eventually executed.

Chuncho prepares to stay in San Miguel, drilling the villagers in the hopes of becoming a General himself; Tate convinces much of the gang to leave San Miguel so they can sell their weapons to Elías. Eventually missing his bandit lifestyle, Chuncho leaves San Miguel under the care of El Santo, his priestly half-brother, on the pretext of recovering a gold-plated Hotchkiss M1914 machine gun from his former gang. After killing one of them, Picaro, Chuncho resumes leadership of the others, hoping to sell the weapons to Elías before returning to San Miguel.

Elías' emissary arrives but is pursued by the Mexican army troops. Tate and Chuncho use the machine gun to decimate the troops, but nearly all of Chuncho's remaining gang is killed in the firefight. Unseen by the others, Tate also kills the emissary. Adelita, Chuncho's last surviving loyal gang member, abandons the pair after her lover, Pepito, is killed in the battle. During the ride to Elías' camp, Tate falls victim to a malaria attack. While getting quinine pills for Tate, Chuncho finds a golden bullet among his possessions; Tate later claims that the bullet is a good luck charm.

Chuncho and Tate arrive at Elías' camp after two days, where they encounter several starving revolutionaries. Chuncho sells the guns and is paid five thousand pesos before learning from Elías that the people of San Miguel were massacred by the army while he was away. Realizing his irresponsibility, Chuncho allows himself to be taken away to be executed by Santo, the sole survivor of the attack. Meanwhile, Tate, from a high vantage point, shoots Elías first and then quickly kills El Santo before Chuncho's sentence can be carried out. Tate escapes as Elías' doctors pronounce his death: shot in the head with a golden bullet.

Weeks later, Chuncho, now an impoverished beggar, tracks Tate to a hotel in Ciudad Juarez and tries to shoot him. Tate, insisting that he has been waiting for him, gives him a half-share of the reward he received from the Mexican Government for assassinating Elías: 100,000 pesos in gold. Chuncho, astonished by Tate's apparent loyalty and friendship, visits a barber, a tailor and a brothel.

The next morning the pair prepare to leave for a new life in the United States. However, when Chuncho watches as Tate cuts through a line to buy their train tickets, he begins to reconsider their relationship and his responsibilities. Learning that he had been further manipulated by Tate through his pretending to be an army prisoner, Chuncho suddenly declares that, although they are friends, he must kill him. Tate asks why, to which Chuncho replies "¿Quién sabe?", (Note: "¿Quién sabe?" means "Who knows?" in Spanish. In the American version, this line is translated as "I don't know".) before shooting Tate dead while he is boarding the slowly moving train. The police arrive at the station and Tate's body begins its return to the United States while Chuncho, laughing maniacally, tosses his bag of money to a group of peasants near him and flees from the authorities down an external corridor of carriages, happily shouting and exhorting the poor to buy dynamite instead of bread.

== Cast ==
- Gian Maria Volonté as Chucho/El Chucho/El Chuncho/Chuncho Muños
- Lou Castel as Bill "Niño" Tate/El Niño/Taylor
- Klaus Kinski as El Santo/Santo
- Martine Beswick as Adelita
- Jaime Fernández as General Elías
- Andrea Checchi as Don Felipe
- Spartaco Conversi as Eufemio
- Joaquín Parra as Picaro
- Aldo Sambrell as Lieutenant Alvaro Ferreira
- José Manuel Martín as Raimundo
- Santiago Santos as Guapo
- Valentino Macchi as Train Engineer

== Production ==
The screenplay and story for A Bullet for the General is credited to Salvatore Laurani while Franco Solinas is credited with the adaptation and dialogue. Film historian Howard Hughes noted that A Bullet for the General was the first Italian Western to seriously deal with the Mexican revolution and credited Solinas with the political aspects on the film. Solinas was a Marxist writer best known in film for his screenplays for Salvatore Giuliano and The Battle of Algiers.

A Bullet for the General was directed by Damiano Damiani and shot in Almería between July and August 1966. Damiani had originally wanted to shoot the film in Mexico which proved to be impossible.

== Release ==
A Bullet for the General was released in Italy on December 2, 1966.

== Reception ==
In a contemporary review, the Monthly Film Bulletin declared the film to be "a lively sortie into the Mexican Revolution with a good deal of boisterous action and a spirited performance from Gian Maria Volonte". The review noted the running time cut from 135 minutes to 77 minutes, stating "substantial pruning unfortunately plays havoc with the continuity (a character who was clearly of some importance in the original is here reduced to a few marginal references)."

Damiano's film has been called a "serious statement about the Mexican Revolution" and has been recognised as an accomplished blend of "tension, action, politics and history".
