= Cineriz =

Italian media company

- Industry: Film
- Founded: 1956
- Founder: Angelo Rizzoli
- Defunct: 1993
- Successor: RCS MediaGroup

Cineriz was an Italian film production and distribution company, founded in 1956 by the businessman Angelo Rizzoli. The company produced and/or distributed films by Federico Fellini, Gillo Pontecorvo, Luchino Visconti, Michelangelo Antonioni, Pier Paolo Pasolini, Pietro Germi, Roberto Rossellini, Vittorio De Sica and others. In 1993, Cineriz was incorporated into the RCS MediaGroup.

== Films produced by Cineriz (selected) ==
- 8½
- Africa Addio
- Before the Revolution
- Boccaccio '70
- The Brigand
- La commare secca
- L'eclisse
- The Flowers of St. Francis
- Mondo Cane

== Films distributed in Italy by Cineriz (selected) ==
- The 400 Blows
- An Average Little Man
- Le belle famiglie
- La Dolce Vita
- Fantozzi (film)
- Juliet of the Spirits
- Me, Me, Me... and the Others
- Move and I'll Shoot
- In the Name of the Pope King
- Ro.Go.Pa.G.
- Il secondo tragico Fantozzi
- Sunday Heroes
- The Traffic Policeman
- Satyricon
- The Psychic, or Sette note in nero
- Una jena in cassaforte (1967)
- Bionda fragola
