= Damiano Damiani =

Italian filmmaker (1922–2013)

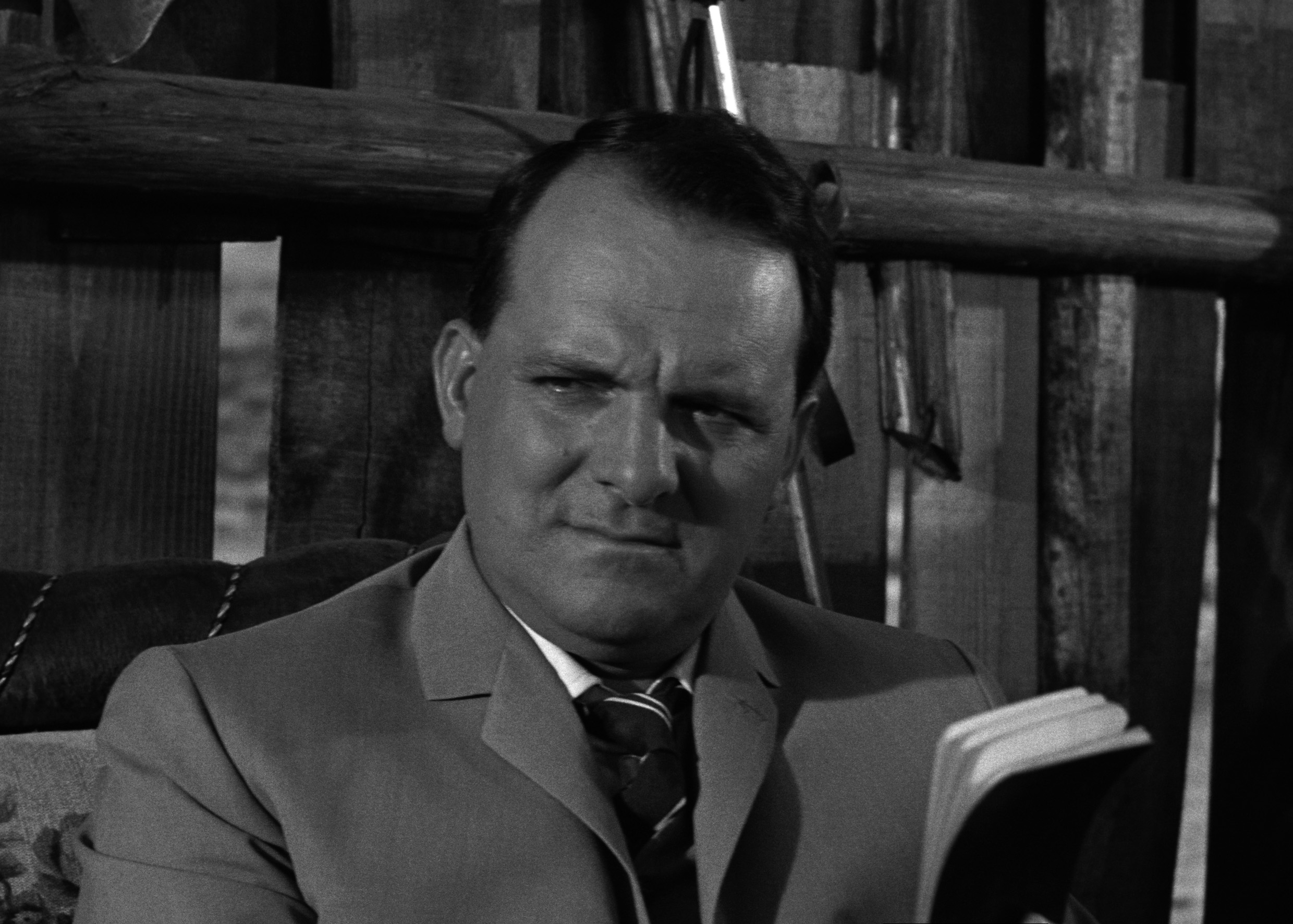
- Damiani in the 1960s
- Born: 23 July 1922; Pasiano di Pordenone, Friuli, Kingdom of Italy
- Died: 7 March 2013 (aged 90); Rome, Italy
- Education: Brera Academy
- Occupations: Film director; screenwriter; comics creator
- Years active: 1947–2002

Damiano Damiani (23 July 1922 – 7 March 2013) was an Italian film director, screenwriter, and comic book creator. He made his film directing debut with the 1960 feature film Lipstick, and became known for his politically-charged crime films, like The Day of the Owl (1968) and Confessions of a Police Captain (1971), as well as the Zapata Western A Bullet for the General (1966).

Poet and director Pier Paolo Pasolini referred to him as "a bitter moralist hungry for old purity", while film critic Paolo Mereghetti said that his style made him "the most American of Italian directors".

== Early life and education ==
Damiani was born in Pasiano di Pordenone, Friuli (now a part of Friuli-Venezia Giulia) in 1922, and studied at the Accademia di Brera in Milan.

== Comics career ==
Before his career as a filmmaker, Damiani was first a comic cartoonist in association with the so-called "Group of Venice", with Fernando Carcupino, Hugo Pratt and Dino Battaglia.

Focused on the comic Asso di Picche (1945–49) the comic featured a masked vigilante who fights crime all over the globe and is in charge of the crime stopping organization, "Band of Panthers".

A smaller publication to which he also contributed through illustration was Mike Lazy (1946), producing two volumes in Albo Dinamite by Edizioni Il Carro in Milan. Then individually producing his own gangster comic, Pat la Rocca (1946). Two books were published in the collection Collana Gialli Film, also by Edizioni Il Carro. A third comic was scheduled and advertised for release, but never materialised.

Continuing his work in the comic industry, Damiani wrote scripts for the photo comic strip Arizona Kid (1949) published in Mondadori magazines such as Avventuroso Film and Bolero Film. Moving on to work on the launch of a similar magazine, Sogno, alongside editor Luciano Pedrocchi, he also later worked as a writer for an adventure comic I Tre Boyscouts (Edizioni Castello, 1948; which was illustrated by Rino Ferrari, Giovanni Benvenuti and Andrea Bresciani). Later in his career, Damiani did some illustration work for the crime noir comic, Hogart il Giustiziere, which was reprinted and published under the title Bogart il Giusitiziere (1968–69).

== Film career ==
In 1947, he directed the short documentary La banda d'Affori, and was an art director and production designer in the film industry for a time. After a few years as a screenwriter, he directed his first feature film in 1960, Lipstick.

His 1962 film, Arturo's Island, won the Golden Shell at the San Sebastián International Film Festival. The 1960s were Damiani's "golden decade"; he was praised by critics and his films were box office successes.

In 1966, he directed A Bullet for the General, one of the first political spaghetti Westerns. In 1968, with The Day of the Owl, he started a series of films in which social criticism, often related to the connections between politics and crime, was mixed with spectacular plots. His 1971 film Confessions of a Police Captain won the Golden Prize at the 7th Moscow International Film Festival.

In 1973 Damiani débuted as an actor, playing Giovanni Amendola in Florestano Vancini's The Assassination of Matteotti. He was known to cult horror film fans for directing Amityville II: The Possession in 1982 for Dino De Laurentiis.

In 1984, he directed the first season of one of the most famous Italian television series, La piovra, a description of the contemporary Italian Mafia and its involvement in politics. His last feature film was Assassini dei giorni di festa, directed in 2002.

== Death ==
Damiani died on 7 March 2013, at his home in Rome, from respiratory failure; he was 90 years old.

== Filmography ==
=== Feature films ===
Year	Title	Functioned as		Notes
Year	Title	Director	Writer	Notes
1960	Lipstick	Yes	Yes	
1960	Blood Feud	Yes	Yes	
1962	Arturo's Island	Yes	Yes	
1963	The Reunion	Yes	Yes	
1963	The Empty Canvas	Yes	Yes	
1966	The Witch in Love	Yes	Yes	
1966	A Bullet for the General	Yes	No	
1968	The Day of the Owl	Yes	Yes	
1968	A Complicated Girl	Yes	Yes	
1970	The Most Beautiful Wife	Yes	Yes	
1971	Confessions of a Police Captain	Yes	Yes	
1971	The Case Is Closed, Forget It	Yes	Yes	
1972	The Assassin of Rome	Yes	Yes	
1974	The Devil Is a Woman	Yes	Yes	
1974	How to Kill a Judge	Yes	Yes	
1975	A Genius, Two Partners and a Dupe	Yes	Yes	
1977	I Am Afraid	Yes	Yes	
1977	Goodbye and Amen	Yes	Yes	
1978	A Man on His Knees	Yes	Yes	
1980	The Warning	Yes	Yes	
1982	Amityville II: The Possession	Yes	No	
1985	Pizza Connection	Yes	Yes	
1986	The Inquiry	Yes	Yes	
1989	Massacre Play	Yes	Yes	
1990	The Dark Sun	Yes	Yes	
1992	Angel with a Gun	Yes	Yes	
2000	Alex l'ariete	Yes	No	

==== Writer only ====
Year	Title	Director	Notes
1947	Notte di nebbia	Gianni Vernuccio	
1953	Piovuto dal cielo	Leonardo De Mitri	
1957	The Mysteries of Paris	Fernando Cerchio	
1957	The Goddess of Love	Fernando Cerchio; Victor Tourjansky	
1958	Herod the Great	Victor Tourjansky	
1959	Head of a Tyrant	Fernando Cerchio	
1959	Prisoner of the Volga	Victor Tourjansky	
1959	The Accomplices	Gianni Vernuccio	
1960	The Cossacks	Victor Tourjansky; Giorgio Rivalta	
1960	Cleopatra's Daughter	Fernando Cerchio	

==== Acting roles ====
- 7 Bullets for Gringo (1967) - Journalist with Gen. Elías (uncredited)
- The Case Is Closed, Forget It (1971) - Vanzi's lawyer (uncredited)
- The Assassination of Matteotti (1973) - Giovanni Amendola
- How to Kill a Judge (1975) - Giacomo Solaris' Attorney (uncredited)

=== Television ===
Year	Title	Functioned as		Notes
Year	Title	Director	Writer	Notes
1982	Parole e sangue	Yes	Yes	3 episodes
1984	La piovra	Yes	No	6 episodes
1990	Lenin...The Train	Yes	Yes	TV movie
1993	Uomo di rispetto	Yes	No	TV movie
1994	Una bambina di troppo	Yes	Yes	TV movie
1999	Ama il tuo nemico	Yes	Yes	TV movie
2001	Ama il tuo nemico 2	Yes	Yes	TV movie
2002	Assassini dei giorni di festa	Yes	No	TV movie

== Awards and nominations ==
Institution	Year	Category	Work	Result
Berlin International Film Festival	1963	Golden Bear	The Reunion	Nominated
Berlin International Film Festival	1963	FIPRESCI Prize	The Reunion	Won
Berlin International Film Festival	1968	Golden Bear	The Day of the Owl	Nominated
Berlin International Film Festival	1985	Golden Bear	Pizza Connection	Won
Berlin International Film Festival	1985	Silver Bear	Pizza Connection	Nominated
David di Donatello	1968	Golden Plate	The Day of the Owl	Won
David di Donatello	1987	Alitalia Award	The Inquiry	Won
Nastro d'Argento	1969	Best Screenplay	The Day of the Owl	Nominated
Nastro d'Argento	1972	Best Director	Confessions of a Police Captain	Nominated
Nastro d'Argento	1987	Best Screenplay	The Inquiry	Nominated
Moscow International Film Festival	1971	Golden Prize	Confessions of a Police Captain	Won
San Sebastián International Film Festival	1962	Golden Shell	Arturo's Island	Won
Taormina Film Fest	1977	Golden Charybdis	I Am Afraid	Nominated
Taormina Film Fest	1980	Golden Charybdis	The Warning	Nominated
Taormina Film Fest	1980	Special Mention	The Warning	Won
Taormina Film Fest	1980	Cinema for UNICEF	The Warning	Won
