= Mario Cecchi Gori =

Italian film producer

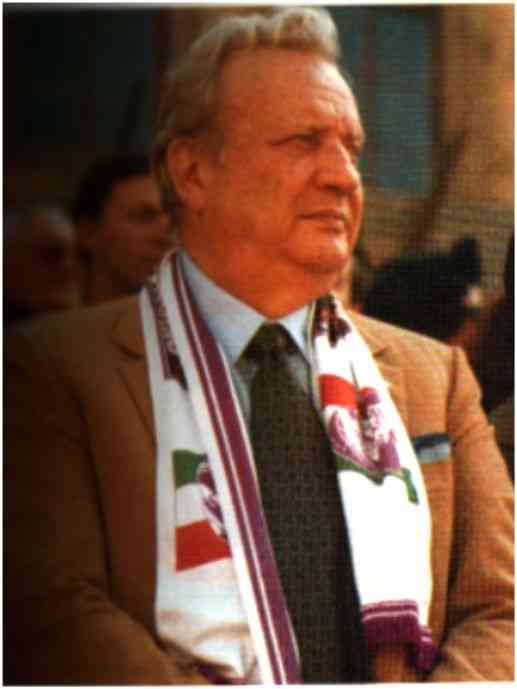
- Born: Mario Cecchi Gori; 21 March 1920; Brescia, Italy
- Died: 5 November 1993 (aged 73); Rome, Italy
- Occupation: Film producer

Mario Cecchi Gori (Italian pronunciation: [ˈmaːrjo ˈtʃekki ˈɡɔːri]; 21 March 1920 – 5 November 1993) was an Italian film producer and owner of companies. He produced over 200 films, notably with Damiano Damiani, Dino Risi (The Easy Life, I Mostri) and Ettore Scola.

Gabriele Salvatores' film Mediterraneo won the Academy Award for Best Foreign Film.

With Lamerica, directed by Gianni Amelio, he received the Best Film Award at European Film Awards in 1994.

Il Postino: The Postman (1995, directed by Michael Radford) was the first Italian film to receive an Academy Award nomination for Best Picture.

From 1990 to his death, he was the president of Fiorentina.

His son Vittorio Cecchi Gori is also a film producer.

== Selected filmography ==
- Vacation with a Gangster (1951)
- The Majordomo (1965)
