= Per vivere meglio, divertitevi con noi =

- Directed by: Flavio Mogherini
- Written by: Castellano & Pipolo; Marcello Coscia; Flavio Mogherini; Isa Mogherini; Cochi e Renato; Carlo Vanzina; Enrico Vanzina
- Starring: Monica Vitti; Renato Pozzetto; Johnny Dorelli; Catherine Spaak; Milena Vukotic
- Cinematography: Franco Di Giacomo; Luigi Kuveiller
- Music by: Detto Mariano
- Release date: 1978
- Running time: 115 minutes
- Country: Italy
- Language: Italian

Per vivere meglio, divertitevi con noi (Italian for "To live better, have fun with us") is a 1978 Italian anthology comedy film written and directed by Flavio Mogherini.

== Cast ==
Segment "Un incontro molto ravvicinato"

- Monica Vitti: Valentina Contarini
- Cesare Barro: Azzurro
- Eugene Walter: Nane

Segment "Il teorema gregoriano"

- Johnny Dorelli: Ottavio Del Bon
- Catherine Spaak: Clodia

Segment "Non si può spiegare, bisogna vederlo"

- Renato Pozzetto: Siro Sante
- Milena Vukotic: Picci
- Elio Crovetto: Picci's husband
- Francesco Salvi: Groom
- Tiziana Pini: Lilli
