= Jacques Ciron =

French actor (1928–2022)

- Born: 17 May 1928; 17th arrondissement of Paris, France
- Died: 7 December 2022 (aged 94); 20th arrondissement of Paris, France
- Occupation: Actor

Jacques Ciron (17 May 1928 – 7 December 2022) was a French actor.

== Biography ==
Ciron was born in the 17th arrondissement of Paris on 17 May 1928. After gaining recognition for his looks and his voice, he became very popular in cinema and boulevard theatre, particularly in the program Au théâtre ce soir. He was also very active in dubbing, lending his voice to several animated Disney films, as well as to the character Alfred Pennyworth in several live-action Batman films. He also lent his voice to the evil clown It in the miniseries of the same name.

Ciron died in the 20th arrondissement of Paris on 7 December 2022, at the age of 94.

== Selected filmography ==
- Le Plus Heureux des hommes (1952)
- The Lottery of Happiness (1953) - (uncredited)
- A Caprice of Darling Caroline (1953) - (uncredited)
- The Long Teeth (1953) - Un journaliste de "Paris France" (uncredited)
- Je suis un mouchard (1953)
- Naked in the Wind (1953) - Hyacinthe
- Innocents in Paris (1953) - Marine Officer (uncredited)
- Tout chante autour de moi (1954)
- Fruits of Summer (1955) - (uncredited)
- French Cancan (1955) - Premier gommeux (uncredited)
- Tant qu'il y aura des femmes (1955) - Hervé
- Madonna of the Sleeping Cars (1955)
- Mon curé chez les pauvres (1956) - (uncredited)
- Marie Antoinette Queen of France (1956) - (uncredited)
- And God Created Woman (1956) - Le secrétaire d'Eric
- Good Evening Paris (1956)
- Maigret Sets a Trap (1958) - Le réceptionniste de l'Hôtel de l'Etoile
- Gigi (1958)
- The Doctor's Horrible Experiment (1959, TV Movie) - Le deuxième passant lors de l'agression
- Thank You, Natercia (1960) - Petit rôle (uncredited)
- Les Livreurs (1961)
- All the Gold in the World (1963) - Un automobiliste (uncredited)
- The Gorillas (1964) - (uncredited)
- Lady L (1965)
- Woman Times Seven (1967) - Féval (segment "At The Opera") (uncredited)
- Mayerling (1968)
- La Prisonnière (1968) - Le spécialiste au vernissage (uncredited)
- The Brain (1969) - L'inspecteur Duboeuf
- The Scarlet Lady (1969)
- Sortie de secours (1970)
- Tintin and the Lake of Sharks (1972) - Le directeur du musée (narrator)
- The Black Windmill (1974) - (uncredited)
- The Smurfs and the Magic Flute (1976) - Le visiteur (narrator)
- Comme sur des roulettes (1977) - L'homme aux nouilles
- Les Charlots en délire (1979) - P.D.G. Bois
- Bobo la tête (1980)
- Camera d'albergo (1981) - Vittorio
- The Secret of the Selenites (1983) - AstuceLunus (narrator)
- My New Partner (1984) - Le patron du restaurant chic
- Nuit docile (1987) - Le patron de l'hôtel de passe
- The Unbearable Lightness of Being (1988) - Swiss Restaurant Manager
- Frantic (1988) - Le Grand Hotel Manager
- La Révolution française (1989) - Joseph-Ignace Guillotin (segment "Années Lumière, Les")
- Sweet Revenge (1990, TV Movie) - Caterer
- Money (1991) - Detective
- 588 rue paradis (1992)
- The Ogre (1996) - State Attorney
- Incontrôlable (2006) - Le militaire dans l'église
- Hunting and Gathering (2007) - Le curé
- Blame It on Mum (2009) - Le notaire
- La croisière (2011) - Raymond
- Paris Manhattan (2012) - Le bâtonnier
- Ernest & Célestine (2012) - Monsieur Rançonnet (narrator)
