= Secret Scandal =

Scandalo Segreto
- Directed by: Monica Vitti
- Written by: Monica Vitti; Gianfranco Clerici; Roberto Russo
- Produced by: Roberto Russo
- Starring: Monica Vitti; Elliott Gould; Gino Pernice; Catherine Spaak
- Cinematography: Luigi Kuveiller
- Edited by: Alberto Gallitti
- Distributed by: Reteitalia Productions; Academy Distribuzione
- Release date: 1989
- Running time: 85 minutes
- Country: Italy
- Language: Italian

Secret Scandal (Italian: Scandalo segreto) is a 1989 Italian film which was written and directed by Monica Vitti. It starred Vitti in the lead role, Elliott Gould, Gino Pernice, and Catherine Spaak. It was screened in the Un Certain Regard section at the 1990 Cannes Film Festival.

For the movie, Monica Vitti made her debut as a director. Nevertheless, it would be her last appearance on the big screen before her death in 2022.

== Synopsis ==
On her birthday, Margherita (Monica Vitti) receives a video camera from a friend, who is a film director (Elliott Gould). She decides to use the device to keep a diary of her life. As the camera is capable of recording automatically, snippets usually feature her talking. However, on one occasion, Margherita leaves the camera in her bedroom as it was still recording; it catches Margherita's husband, Paolo (Gino Pernice), who has always had a distant demeanor to her, as he cheats on her with her best friend (Catherine Spaak). A secret scandal ensues in their separation with Paolo's departure and Margherita going into a deep depression, even to the point of contemplating suicide. Her friend, the director who gave her the camera, examines the film, and concludes that it is interesting material for an actual movie.

== Cast ==
- Monica Vitti
- Elliott Gould
- Gino Pernice
- Catherine Spaak
- Carmen Onorati
- Pietro De Vico
- Donatella Gambini
- Daniele Stroppa
- Gianni Olivieri
- Daniela Rindi

== Awards ==
- 1990 David di Donatello award for Best new director: Monica Vitti
