= Scusa se è poco =

- Italian theatrical release poster by Renato Casaro
- Directed by: Marco Vicario
- Written by: Marco Vicario; Franco Marotta; Sandro Parenzo; Laura Toscano
- Story by: Aldo De Benedetti
- Produced by: Fulvio Lucisano; Paolo Vasile
- Starring: Monica Vitti
- Cinematography: Luigi Kuveiller
- Music by: Dario Farina; Gian Piero Reverberi
- Release date: 1982
- Country: Italy
- Language: Italian

Scusa se è poco is a 1982 Italian comedy film written and directed by Marco Vicario and starring Monica Vitti, Ugo Tognazzi and Diego Abatantuono.

== Plot ==
Two episodes, both focused on the middle-aged married couple in crisis: in the first, the couple divorced rent, unbeknownst to each other, the same apartment; in the second, the wife of a respected dentist writes, under a false name, a pornographic highly successful novel.

== Cast ==
- Monica Vitti as Renata Adorni / Grazia Siriani
- Ugo Tognazzi as Carlo Reani
- Diego Abatantuono as Piero
- Orazio Orlando as Tullio
- Mario Carotenuto as Tullio's Father
- Fiorenza Marchegiani as Isabella
- Mauro Di Francesco as Filippo
- Nanda Primavera as Giovanna
- Enzo Robutti as Lawyer Sacchetti Morini
- Maurizio Mattioli as The Florist
- Loredana Martinez as Gertrude

== See also ==
- List of Italian films of 1982
