= L'altra metà del cielo =

- Directed by: Franco Rossi
- Cinematography: Luigi Kuveiller
- Music by: Adriano Celentano; Detto Mariano
- Release date: 1977
- Country: Italy
- Language: Italian

L'altra metà del cielo (The other half of the sky) is a 1977 Italian comedy film directed by Franco Rossi.

It is loosely based on the comedy play Romancero by Jacques Deval.

== Plot ==
Don Vincenzo (Adriano Celentano), a priest sent in a mining village in Australia, seeks to redeem the Sicilian Susanna (Monica Vitti), a.k.a. "Susy".

== Cast ==
- Adriano Celentano: Don Vincenzo
- Monica Vitti: Susanna
- Venantino Venantini: Mr. Recchia
- Paolo Paoloni: Bishop of Sydney
- Mario Carotenuto: William Donego
- Glauco Onorato: Thief
- Gianfranco Barra: Passenger
- Bill Vanders: Policeman
