= Monica Vitti =

Italian actress (1931–2022)

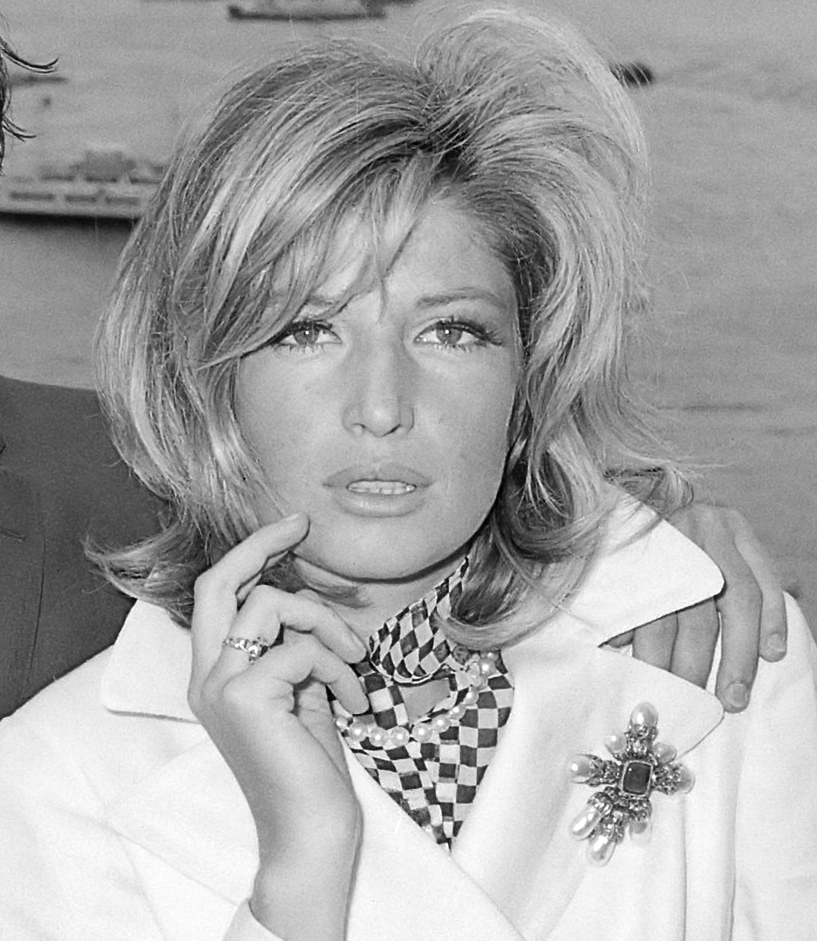
- Vitti in 1965
- Born: Maria Luisa Ceciarelli; 3 November 1931; Rome, Kingdom of Italy
- Died: 2 February 2022 (aged 90); Rome, Italy
- Occupation: Actress
- Years active: 1954–1992
- Spouse: Roberto Russo (m. 2000)

Maria Luisa Ceciarelli (3 November 1931 – 2 February 2022), known professionally as Monica Vitti, was an Italian actress who starred in several award-winning films directed by Michelangelo Antonioni during the 1960s. She appeared with Marcello Mastroianni, Alain Delon, Richard Harris, Terence Stamp, and Dirk Bogarde. On her death, Italian culture minister Dario Franceschini called her "the Queen of Italian cinema".

Vitti won five David di Donatello Awards for Best Actress, seven Italian Golden Globes for Best Actress, the Career Golden Globe, and the Venice Film Festival Career Golden Lion Award.

== Early life ==
Born Maria Luisa Ceciarelli in Rome on 3 November 1931 to Adele Vittiglia, from Bologna, and Angelo Ceciarelli. She took her stage name from her mother's maiden name. Vitti acted in amateur productions as a teenager, then trained as an actress at Rome's National Academy of Dramatic Arts (graduating in 1953) and at Pittman's College, where she played a teen in a charity performance of Dario Niccodemi's La nemica. She toured Germany with an Italian acting troupe, and her first stage appearance in Rome was for a production of Niccolò Machiavelli's La Mandragola.

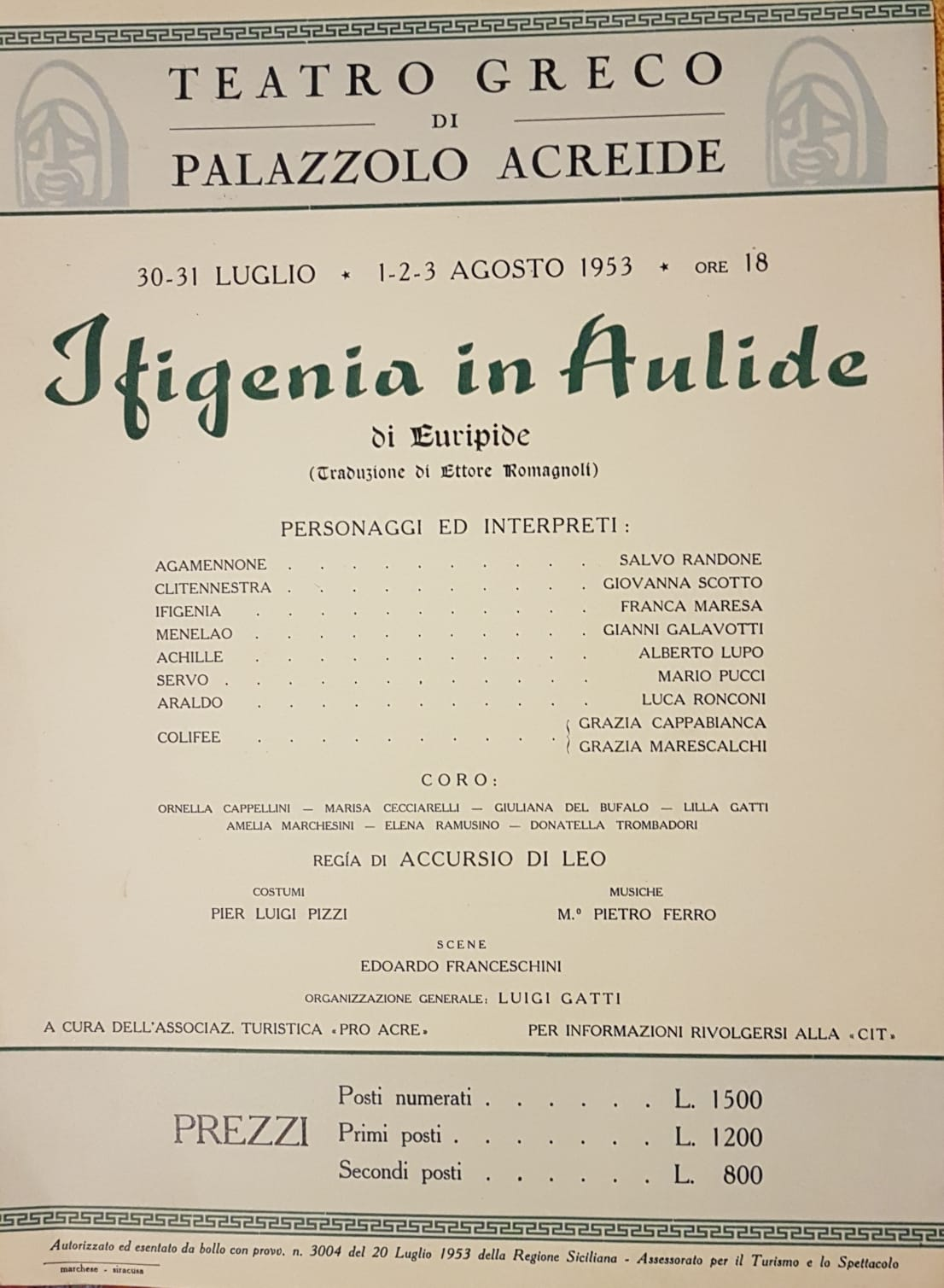
Vitti as Marisa Cecciarelli early in her career (1953)

== Film career ==
=== Early roles ===
Vitti's first film role was an uncredited bit part in Edoardo Anton's Laugh! Laugh! Laugh! (1954). She was in Adriana Lecouvreur (1955), the TV series L'alfiere (1956) and the TV movies Questi ragazzi (1956) and Il tunnel (1958). She did an episode of the television series Mont-Oriol (1958) and dubbed Rossana Rory's voice in Big Deal on Madonna Street (1958).

Vitti's first widely noted performance was at 26, in Mario Amendola's Le dritte (1958) with Franco Fabrizi. She was in the TV movie Il borghese gentiluomo (1959).

=== Antonioni ===
In 1957 she joined Michelangelo Antonioni's Teatro Nuovo di Milano and dubbed the voice of Dorian Gray in the director's Il Grido (The Cry, 1957). Over the next several years in several "intense portraits of alienation she became the perfect mouthpiece for Antonioni himself". She played a leading role in Antonioni's internationally praised film L'Avventura (1960) as a detached and cool protagonist drifting into a relationship with the lover of her missing girlfriend. Giving a screen presence that has been described as "stunning", she is also credited with helping Antonioni raise money for the production and sticking with him through daunting location shooting. L'Avventura made Vitti an international star. Her image later appeared on an Italian postage stamp commemorating the film. According to The New York Times, Vitti's "air of disenchantment perfectly conveys the unreal aura of her heroines."

Vitti received critical praise for her starring roles in the Antonioni film La Notte (Night, 1961), with Jeanne Moreau and Marcello Mastroianni. Vitti starred in a TV movie Le notti bianche (1962), then did a third with Antonioni, L'Eclisse (1962) with Alain Delon.

Vitti was one of many stars in an anthology movie, Three Fables of Love (1962). She had a cameo in Sweet and Sour (1963) and played the lead in a comedy for Roger Vadim, Nutty, Naughty Chateau (1963). Vitti was then in another anthology film High Infidelity (1964) and made a fourth with Antonioni, Il Deserto Rosso (Red Desert, 1964), with Richard Harris. The director said Vitti "certainly inspires me, because I like to watch and direct her, but the parts I give her are a long way from her own character." After Vitti's relationship with Antonioni ended, the two did not work together again until The Mystery of Oberwald (1980).

Vitti starred in a comedy for Tinto Brass, The Flying Saucer (1964), and appeared in the anthology, The Dolls (1964).

=== International films ===
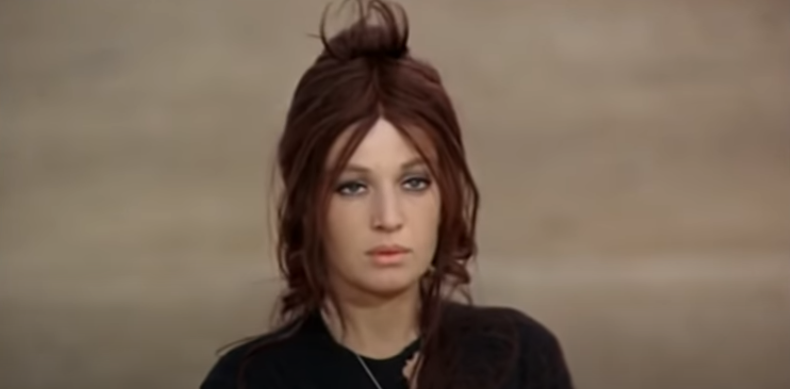
Vitti in The Girl with a Pistol (1968)

Vitti's first English-language film was Modesty Blaise (1966), a mod James Bond spy spoof that co-starred Terence Stamp and Dirk Bogarde and was directed by Joseph Losey: it had only mixed success and received harsh critical reviews.

She performed in the anthology movie The Queens (1966), a television series Les fables de La Fontaine (1966), Kill Me Quick, I'm Cold (1967) with Jean Sorel, and I Married You for Fun (1967).

Vitti appeared in On My Way to the Crusades, I Met a Girl Who... (1967) with Tony Curtis, The Girl with a Pistol (1968) with Stanley Baker, The Bitch Wants Blood (1969) with Maurice Ronet, and Help Me, My Love (1969) with Alberto Sordi.

=== 1970s ===
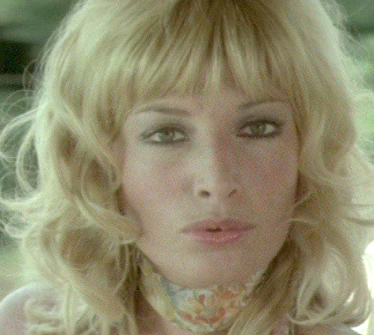
Vitti in Duck in Orange Sauce (1975)

Vitti starred with Marcello Mastroianni in Ettore Scola's highly successful romantic comedy, Dramma della gelosia (The Pizza Triangle, 1970). She followed it with Ninì Tirabusciò, la donna che inventò la mossa (1970), Man and Wife (1970) with Sordi, The Pacifist (1970), La supertestimone (1971), That's How We Women Are (1971), and Orders Are Orders (1972).

Vitti was in a version of La Tosca (1973) and in several comedies directed by Carlo Di Palma, who was her partner for several years in the 1970s, beginning with Teresa the Thief (1973). She made Polvere di stelle (1973), directed by Alberto Sordi, for which she won the 1974 David di Donatello award for Best Actress.

Vitti played a key part in one of the vignettes in Luis Buñuel's The Phantom of Liberty (1974). She did two films with Claudia Cardinale, The Immortal Bachelor (1975) and Blonde in Black Leather (1975).

She was in Duck in Orange Sauce (1975), Mimì Bluette... fiore del mio giardino (1976), Basta che non si sappia in giro!.. (1977), L'altra metà del cielo (1977), State Reasons (1978), Il cilindro (1978, for television), Per vivere meglio, divertitevi con noi (1978), Amori miei (1978), and Tigers in Lipstick (1979) (with Ursula Andress).

Vitti's second English-language film was An Almost Perfect Affair (1979), directed by Michael Ritchie and co-starring Keith Carradine, which was set during the Cannes Film Festival. A New York Times article from that period reported Vitti had resisted starring in American films as she did not like long travel, especially by air, and believed that her English was not of a high enough standard. Indeed, such was her aversion to travelling from Europe that Paramount Pictures was apparently forced to cancel the first leg of a publicity tour organised in the US to promote the release of An Almost Perfect Affair.

=== Later career ===
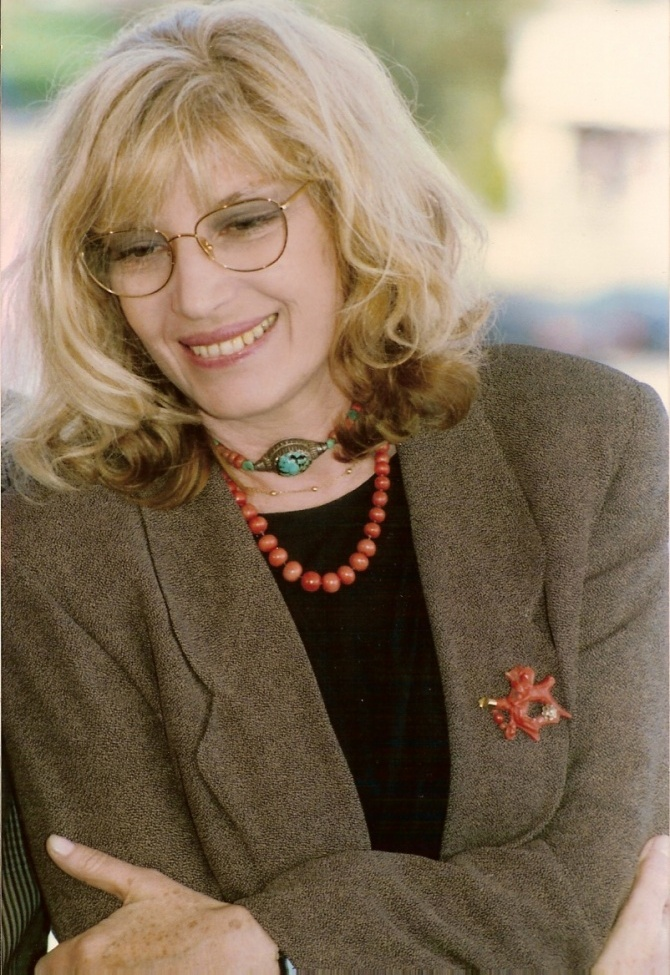
Vitti in 1990

Vitti reunited with Antonioni in The Mystery of Oberwald (Il mistero di Oberwald, 1980). She followed it with I Don't Understand You Anymore (1980), Camera d'albergo (1981), Tango of Jealousy (1981), I Know That You Know That I Know (1982) with Sordi, Scusa se è poco (1982), Flirt (1983), and Francesca è mia (1986). She also co-wrote the last two films. In 1984, France awarded her the Order of Arts and Letters. French Culture Minister Jack Lang praised her for helping spur a renewal of Italian films: "We need Italian cinema to find its health again so that French cinema will not remain an island in the middle of other European countries," Lang said. On 26 January 1995, she was raised to the rank of Commander of that Order. By 1986, Vitti had returned to the theatre as an actress and teacher.

In 1989, Vitti tried writing and directing and created Scandalo Segreto (1990), in which she also starred alongside Elliott Gould. The film was unsuccessful commercially and she then retired from cinema. During the 1990s, she did television work, acting in the television miniseries Ma tu mi vuoi bene? (1992).

In 1993, Vitti was awarded the Festival Tribute at the Créteil International Women's Film Festival in France.

== Personal life and death ==
Antonioni and Vitti met in the late 1950s, and their relationship grew stronger after L'Avventura was made, because it had shaped both their careers. By the late 1960s, they ceased working on films, making the relationship strained until it officially ended. In a later interview, Vitti stated that Antonioni ended their relationship. For several years in the 1970s her partner was Carlo Di Palma, best known as a cinematographer though she starred in three films he directed. In 2000, Vitti married Roberto Russo, with whom she had been in a relationship since 1983. She made her last public appearance in 2002 when she attended the Paris premiere of the stage musical Notre-Dame de Paris. In 2011, it was disclosed that Alzheimer's disease had "removed her from the public gaze for the last 15 years". In 2018, her husband confirmed she was still living at home with him in Rome and that he looked after her with the assistance of a caregiver. Vitti died of complications from Dementia with Lewy bodies disease in Rome on 2 February 2022, at the age of 90.

== Awards ==
- Nastro d'Argento for Best Supporting Actress, 1962
- Nastro d'Argento for Best Actress, 1969 and 1976
- David di Donatello for Best Actress: 1969 for The Girl with a Pistol, 1971, 1974, 1976 for Duck in Orange Sauce, and 1979 for Amori miei
- Golden Grail (Italy): 4 occasions
- Silver Bear for an outstanding single achievement, 34th Berlin International Film Festival, 1984
- Leone d'oro for Lifetime Achievement, 1995

== Filmography ==
Year	Title	Role	Notes
1954	Laugh! Laugh! Laugh!	Maria Teresa	Uncredited
1955	Adriana Lecouvreur		
1956	Una pelliccia di visone	Luisa Panetti	
1958	Le dritte	Ofelia Granelli	
1960	L'Avventura	Claudia	Italian Golden Globe Award for Best Actress Revelation; Golden Grail for Best Actress; Nominated—BAFTA for Best Foreign Actress; Nominated—Nastro d'Argento for Best Actress
1961	La Notte	Valentina Gherardini	Nastro d'Argento for Best Supporting Actress
1962	L'Eclisse	Vittoria	Nominated—Nastro d'Argento for Best Actress
1962	Three Fables of Love	Madeleine	(segment "Le lièvre et le tortue"); Golden Plate
1963	Sweet and Sour	Elle	
1963	Nutty, Naughty Chateau	Eleanore Falsen	
1963	Follie d'estate	Maria Teresa	(archive footage)
1964	High Infidelity	Gloria	(segment "La sospirosa"); Nominated—Nastro d'Argento for Best Supporting Actress
1964	Red Desert	Giuliana	Golden Grail for Best Actress
1964	Il disco volante	Dolores	
1965	Le bambole	Giovanna	(segment "La minestra")
1966	Modesty Blaise	Modesty Blaise	
1966	Sex Quartet	Sabina	(segment "Fata Sabina"); Nominated—Nastro d'Argento for Best Supporting Actress
1967	Kill Me Quick, I'm Cold	Giovanna	
1967	I Married You for Fun	Giuliana	Italian Golden Globe Award for Best Actress; Nominated—Golden Grail for Best Actress; Nominated—Nastro d'Argento for Best Actress
1967	On My Way to the Crusades, I Met a Girl Who...	Boccadoro	
1968	The Girl with the Pistol	Assunta Patanè	David di Donatello for Best Actress; Nastro d'Argento for Best Actress; Italian Golden Globe Award for Best Actress; Golden Grail for Best Actress
1969	The Scarlet Lady	Eva	
1969	Help Me, My Love	Raffaella Macchiavelli	Golden Grail for Best Actress (also for The Pizza Triangle )
1970	The Pizza Triangle	Adelaide Ciafrocchi	Italian Golden Globe Award for Best Actress
1970	Ninì Tirabusciò	Maria Sarti / Ninì Tirabusciò	David di Donatello for Best Actress; Nominated—Nastro d'Argento for Best Actress (also for The Pizza Triangle )
1970	Man and Wife	Adele; Giulia	(segment "Il frigorifero") (segment "Il leone")
1970	The Pacifist	Barbara	
1971	La Supertestimone	Isolina Pantò	Italian Golden Globe Award for Best Actress
1971	That's How We Women Are	Orchestra Member; Zoe; Annunziata; Teresa; Alberta; Eliana; Katherine; Erika; Palmira; Agata; Laura; Fulvia	(segment "Una giornata lavorativa") (segment "Romantica") (segment "Mamma") (segment "Schiava d'amore") (segment "Il mondo cammina") (segment "Vietnam") (segment "Et Dominus venit") (segment "La motocicletta") (segment "Cuore di padrone") (segment "L'angolo dei cieli") (segment "L'allumeuse") (segment "Chiamate Roma 21-21")
1972	Gli ordini sono ordini	Giorgia	
1973	La Tosca	Floria Tosca	Italian Golden Globe Award for Best Actress
1973	Teresa the Thief	Teresa Numa	Nominated—Nastro d'Argento for Best Actress
1973	Polvere di stelle	Dea Dani	David di Donatello for Best Actress
1974	The Phantom of Liberty	Mme Foucaud / Mrs. Foucauld	
1975	The Immortal Bachelor	Tina Candela	
1975	Blonde in Black Leather	Miele	
1975	Duck in Orange Sauce	Lisa Stefani	David di Donatello for Best Actress; Nastro d'Argento for Best Actress
1976	Mimì Bluette... fiore del mio giardino	Mimì Bluette	
1976	Basta che non si sappia in giro	Armanda; Lia	(segment "Macchina d'amore") (segment "L'equivoco")
1977	L'altra metà del cielo	Susanna Maccaluso	Nominated—Nastro d'Argento for Best Actress
1978	State Reasons	Angela Ravelli	
1978	Amori miei	Anna Lisa Bianchi	David di Donatello for Best Actress
1978	Per vivere meglio, divertitevi con noi	Valentina Contarini	(segment "Un incontro molto ravvicinato")
1979	Tigers in Lipstick	Maria / The Prostitute	
1979	An Almost Perfect Affair	Maria Barone	
1980	The Mystery of Oberwald	The Queen	
1980	I Don't Understand You Anymore	Luisa	
1981	Camera d'albergo	Flaminia	Italian Golden Globe Award for Best Actress
1981	Il tango della gelosia	Lucia	
1982	I Know That You Know That I Know	Livia Bonetti	
1982	Scusa se è poco	Renata Adorni / Grazia Siriani	
1983	Flirt	Laura	Silver Bear for an outstanding single achievement Italian Golden Globe Award for Best Actress; Nominated—David di Donatello for Best Actress; Nominated—Nastro d'Argento for Best Actress
1986	Francesca è mia	Francesca	
1989	Secret Scandal	Margherita / wife	Italian Golden Globe for the Best First Feature; Italian Golden Globe Award for Best Actress; Nominated—David di Donatello for Best New Director

=== Television ===
- Ma tu mi vuoi bene? (1992 miniseries)
