= I Don't Understand You Anymore =

- Directed by: Sergio Corbucci
- Written by: Iaia Fiastri; Riccardo Aragno; Cesare Frugoni; Sabatino Ciuffini
- Story by: Aldo De Benedetti
- Starring: Monica Vitti; Gigi Proietti; Johnny Dorelli
- Cinematography: Luigi Kuveiller
- Music by: Gianni Ferrio
- Release date: 1980
- Country: Italy
- Language: Italian

I Don't Understand You Anymore (Italian: Non ti conosco più amore) is a 1980 Italian comedy film directed by Sergio Corbucci. It is based on the comedy play with the same name by Aldo De Benedetti, which had previously inspired the film I Don't Know You Anymore directed by Nunzio Malasomma and starred by Vittorio De Sica.

== Plot ==
Luisa is married to the lawyer Paolo Malpieri and their marriage seems to proceed normally, until she, coming home and finding her husband in the shower, treats him like a complete stranger and accuses him of being a sex maniac, calling in the police. The psychiatrist Alberto Spinelli, who should have taken care of Paolo, easily realizes that the problem belongs to Luisa and tries to subject her to therapy; the problem worsens as soon Luisa is convinced that Alberto is her husband. From that moment, the life of the spouses is upset: Alberto, convinced that Luisa has suffered a trauma, supports her to try to heal her; while Paolo, jealous, wants to resume his post as consort and fears that the psychiatrist will take advantage of the situation.

After various misadventures (which also involve Luisa's eccentric aunt, who got mad at Paolo), Alberto realizes that the cause of Luisa's problem is Allegra, Paolo's young and busty typist. Luisa offers of her own free will to reconstruct a precise event and lets it be understood that she has glimpsed him and Allegra in an unequivocal attitude through a half-open door. After finishing telling the fact, Luisa appears able to remember everything, recognizing Paolo as her husband: later she confesses that she has never lost her memory, and that she has devised a stratagem to punish her husband for his betrayal. The two reconcile, while Alberto, who after his long association had begun to fall in love with the woman, remains alone and disconsolate.

== Cast ==
- Monica Vitti: Luisa Malpieri
- Gigi Proietti: Alberto Spinelli
- Johnny Dorelli: Paolo Malpieri
- Franca Valeri: Aunt Maritza
- Donatella Damiani: Allegra

== See also ==
- List of Italian films of 1980
