= La supertestimone =

- Directed by: Franco Giraldi
- Written by: Tonino Guerra; Ruggero Maccari
- Starring: Monica Vitti
- Cinematography: Carlo Di Palma
- Music by: Luis Enríquez Bacalov
- Release date: 1971
- Language: Italian

La supertestimone is a 1971 Italian black comedy film, directed by Franco Giraldi. For this film Monica Vitti was awarded with a Globo d'oro for Best Actress.

In the film, a pimp is suspected of murdering his lover. He is convicted based on the testimony of a single witness. The woman doubts her memory of the event, and manages to have his prison sentence reduced. She falls in love and marries the pimp. He prostitutes his new wife, and eventually explains to her that he was actually guilty in the murder case.

== Plot ==
Marino Bottecchia, known as "Moccasin", is a pimp. He profits from prostituting his lover, Tiziana. One Friday evening, the girl is found killed: Marino, immediately suspected, proves to have an alibi. From the photos in the newspapers, which devote ample space to the squalid event and to its characters, Isolina Pantò - extravagant owner of a private asylum and former servant in a convent - recognizes the suspect whom she remembers seeing at the crime scene.

Her detailed and precise testimony sentenced Bottecchia to 20 years in prison, demolishing both the alibi and the testimonies in his favor. Isolina, who lives alone, has a friend who got married on the Thursday before the day of Tiziana's murder. This circumstance, reminded her by the bride, convinces Isolina that she has fallen into error. She repented, resorted to the judicial authority and obtained a review of the trial: Marino was not released, but sentenced to four years of imprisonment for minor offenses that emerged during the trial.

Determined to make amends, Isolina lovingly assists the inmate, even moving to nearby the penitentiary in order to be closer to him. In short, the two end up falling in love and get married in prison. Finally free, Marino - after pretending not to be able to get a job - induces Isolina into prostitution and, when the woman shows that she is too fond of a client, he does not hesitate to reveal to her that he was the one to kill Tiziana.

== Cast ==
- Monica Vitti: Isolina Pantò
- Ugo Tognazzi: Marino Bottecchia
- Orazio Orlando: warden
- Véronique Vendell: sister of Isolina
- Filippo De Gara: inspector
- Franco Balducci: an inmate
- Nerina Montagnani: mother of an inmate
- Roy Bosier: an inmate
- Ennio Antonelli: a witness
