= Una botta di vita =

1988 Italian comedy film

- Directed by: Enrico Oldoini
- Written by: Alberto Sordi; Liliana Betti; Age & Scarpelli; Enrico Oldoini
- Starring: Alberto Sordi; Bernard Blier
- Cinematography: Giuseppe Ruzzolini
- Edited by: Raimondo Crociani
- Music by: Manuel De Sica
- Release date: 22 December 1988
- Running time: 92 min
- Country: Italy
- Language: Italian

Una botta di vita (also known as Taste of Life and A Blast of Life) is a 1988 Italian comedy film directed by Enrico Oldoini.

== Plot ==
Mondardini and Battistini, two old men on their own, strike up a friendship and decide to go on an expedition. While Mondardini, driving a beautiful old Lancia Aurelia, is a man of culture, Battistini is not and his view of life is soured since his wife left him when his leg was amputated. They head for Bordighera to see a childhood friend of Mondardini, but on arriving find that he has just died. Turning round, they head for Portofino and in a restaurant meet a young woman going to St Tropez whose friends have accidentally left her behind. Although Battistini refuses to enter France, Mondardini drives across the frontier while he is asleep and delivers the grateful girl.

In the middle of August the two men can find no room for the night and at least find something to eat at a dance for old folk. Outside they meet the girl they brought, who has rejoined her friends, and they all go to a quiet spot beside the sea where the two old men are given their first joint of marijuana. Waking in the morning they are surrounded by naked people, for it is a nudist beach. Thirsty, they ask for water at an industrial plant nearby, where the man in charge gives them recycled sewage.

Driving to Cannes, they meet Germaine, who has just lost everything in the casino. The two take her to lunch, which is ruined for Battistini because the chef is Riccardo, the man who stole his wife. When Riccardo says he can have his wife back, Battistini refuses. That night Mondardini takes Germaine to the casino and wins back for her all she had lost. She gracefully refuses his offer to spend the night in her room, only to find that Battistini has sneaked in. She lets him stay on the floor, while a grumpy Mondardini sleeps in the car.

In the morning the two men quarrel fiercely and Mondardini drives off to Portofino alone. Battistini wangles a ride in a bus full of German tourists, which is halted by an accident: Mondardini's car is smashed and he is being loaded unconscious into an ambulance. Battistini wangles his way into the ambulance, where he loudly proclaims the merits of his dying friend. Then a jolt brings Mondardini back to life, and he starts bantering with Battistini all over again.

== Cast ==
- Alberto Sordi: Elvio Battistini
- Bernard Blier: Giuseppe Mondardini
- Andréa Ferréol: Germaine
- Vittorio Caprioli: Riccardo
- Alberto Sorrentino: Friend of Battistini
- Elena Falgheri: Camilla
- Nerina Montagnani: Old woman
