= An Ideal Adventure =

- Directed by: Steno
- Written by: Cesare Frugoni; Stefano Vanzina; Enrico Vanzina
- Produced by: Pio Angeletti; Adriano De Micheli
- Starring: Edwige Fenech; Diego Abatantuono; Liù Bosisio
- Cinematography: Luigi Kuveiller
- Edited by: Raimondo Crociani
- Music by: Detto Mariano
- Production company: Dean Film
- Release date: 1 April 1982
- Running time: 96 minutes
- Country: Italy
- Language: Italian

An Ideal Adventure (Italian: Sballato, gasato, completamente fuso) is a 1982 Italian comedy film directed by Steno and starring Edwige Fenech, Diego Abatantuono and Liù Bosisio.

== Cast ==
- Edwige Fenech as Patrizia Reda
- Diego Abatantuono as Duccio Tricarico
- Liù Bosisio as Orietta Fallani
- Mauro Di Francesco as Pippo - De Pino's valet
- Enrico Maria Salerno as Eugenio Zafferi
- Cinzia De Ponti as Zafferi's Daughter
- Stefano Gragnani as Office Boy
- Peter Berling as Brian De Pino
- Maria Rosaria Spadola
- Sandro Ghiani as The Zookeeper
- Giorgio Giuliani as Giorgetti - Patrizia's colleague
- Ivana Milan as Claudia - Zafferi's Second Daughter
- Annibale Rocco

== Bibliography ==
- Roberto Chiti & Roberto Poppi. Dizionario del cinema italiano: Volume 5. Gremese Editore, 1991.
