= Orazio Orlando =

Italian actor (1933–1990)

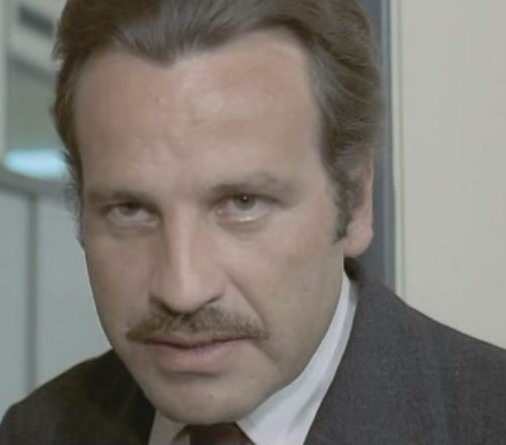
- Born: 14 June 1933; Naples, Italy
- Died: 18 December 1990 (aged 57); Rome, Italy

Orazio Orlando (14 June 1933 – 18 December 1990) was an Italian film, stage and television actor.

== Life and career ==
Born in Naples, Orlando attended the Academy of Dramatic Arts in Rome for two seasons, in 1953-54 and in 1954-55, without graduating. He made his debut at 18, with the stage company of Renzo Ricci, along with Giorgio Albertazzi and Anna Proclemer. His first important participation was in Shakespeare's King Lear, in 1955.

In 1958 he began his television career in the role of Tybalt in a successful adaptation of Romeo and Juliet; he took part in a great number of films, TV-series and television movies, but became popular in 1973 thanks to the interpretation of the Commissioner Solmi, in the television series Qui squadra mobile.

He is best remembered for his film roles in Elio Petri's Investigation of a Citizen Above Suspicion (1970) and Property Is No Longer a Theft (1973), Pupi Avati's Help Me Dream (1981) and Alberto Bevilacqua's Woman of Wonders (1985).

At 57 years old, he died of a heart attack on the Teatro Flaiano stage in Rome during the rehearsal of the play Ad Eva aggiungi Eva.

== Selected filmography ==
- Le bambole (1965) - Richetto, amante (segment "Minestra, La")
- Investigation of a Citizen Above Suspicion (1970) - Brigadiere Biglia
- Il debito coniugale (1970) - Romolo
- Waterloo (1970) - Constant
- La supertestimone (1971) - Charlot, il secondino capo
- Ripped Off (1972) - Mike Dugall
- Gli ordini sono ordini (1972) - Amedeo - Giorgia's husband
- The Adventures of Pinocchio (1972) - Maresciallo
- It Was Me (1973)
- Property Is No Longer a Theft (1973) - Brigadier Pirelli
- Amore mio uccidimi! (1973) - Riccardo - l'amico de Guido
- Lovers and Other Relatives (1974) - Renzo
- Brigitte, Laura, Ursula, Monica, Raquel, Litz, Florinda, Barbara, Claudia, e Sofia le chiamo tutte... anima mia (1974) - Franco Donati
- Policewoman (1974) - Ruggero Patanè
- The Perfume of the Lady in Black (1974) - Nicola
- Bello come un arcangelo (1974) - Avv. Pantaleo Fortis, 'Totonno'
- The Flower in His Mouth (1975) - Pretore Occhipinti
- La linea del fiume (1976) - Amedeo
- Evil Thoughts (1976) - lawyer Borderò
- L'Italia s'è rotta (1976)
- Maschio latino cercasi (1977) - Gennarino (segment "Gennarino l'emigrante")
- Gangbuster (1977) - Giorgio
- Il mostro (1977) - Pisani
- Highway Racer (1977) - Silicato
- Tre soldi e la donna di classe (1977)
- Corleone (1977) - Pubblico Ministero
- Traffic Jam (1979) - Ferreri
- Tigers in Lipstick (1979) - Fioroni / The Arab (segment "L'arabo")
- Speed driver (1980)
- Help Me Dream (1981) - Guido
- Superstition (1982) - (uncredited)
- Scusa se è poco (1982) - Tullio (segment "Trenta minuti d'amore")
- Woman of Wonders (1985) - Ulisse
- Sicilian Connection (1987)
