= Property Is No Longer a Theft =

1973 Italian–French film

- Directed by: Elio Petri
- Screenplay by: Elio Petri; Ugo Pirro
- Story by: Elio Petri; Ugo Pirro
- Produced by: Claudio Mancini
- Starring: Ugo Tognazzi; Flavio Bucci; Daria Nicolodi
- Cinematography: Luigi Kuveiller
- Edited by: Ruggero Mastroianni
- Music by: Ennio Morricone
- Production companies: Quasars Film Company; Labrador Films
- Distributed by: Titanus
- Release date: 1 July 1973 (Italy)
- Running time: 125 minutes
- Countries: Italy; France
- Language: Italian

Property Is No Longer a Theft (Italian: La proprietà non è più un furto) is a 1973 Italian-French comedy drama film directed by Elio Petri.

The film is considered the conclusion to Petri's so-called Trilogy of Neuroses, showing the neurosis of money, along with Investigation of a Citizen Above Suspicion (neurosis of power), and The Working Class Goes to Heaven (neurosis of work).

== Plot ==
Total, a young bank cashier, is allergic to money and feels only contempt for his customers who, in his eyes built their wealth on criminal or corrupt activities. After witnessing an armed robbery in his bank, he becomes a Marxist, resigns from his job and turns to theft for ideological reasons. He stalks a former client, a butcher from Rome who for him represents the evils of capitalism, and robs him of his valuables: first the butcher's knife and hat, then his jewellery, money, car and even his mistress Anita. When the butcher identifies his pursuer, he tries to pay Total off, but the latter resists and teams up with professional thief Albertone instead. Total continues on his path, the expoliation of other people's property, until he is stopped by the butcher who strangles him to death in an elevator.

== Cast ==
- Ugo Tognazzi as the butcher
- Flavio Bucci as Total
- Daria Nicolodi as Anita
- Salvo Randone as Total's father
- Mario Scaccia as Albertone
- Julien Guiomar as bank director
- Jacques Herlin as bank employee
- Gigi Proietti as Paco
- Orazio Orlando as Pirelli
- Ettore Garofolo as Bocio
- Gino Milli as Zaganè
- Cecilia Polizzi as Mafalda
- Luigi Antonio Guerra
- Ada Pometti

== Release ==
Property Is No Longer a Theft was screened in competition at the 23rd Berlin International Film Festival. The film was censored by authorities in Italy for obscenity and offense to modesty, however despite this, it received a good response from the public.

== Reception ==
The film was harshly reviewed by left wing critics at the time, and the film was considered the weakest of the trilogy.
