= To Forget Venice =

To forget Venice
- Film poster
- Directed by: Franco Brusati
- Written by: Franco Brusati; Jaja Fiastri
- Starring: Mariangela Melato; Erland Josephson; David Pontremoli; Eleonora Giorgi
- Cinematography: Romano Albani
- Music by: Benedetto Ghiglia
- Release date: 14 April 1979
- Running time: 110 minutes
- Country: Italy
- Language: Italian

To Forget Venice (Italian: Dimenticare Venezia) is a 1979 Italian drama film written and directed by Franco Brusati. It was nominated for the Academy Award for Best Foreign Language Film at the 52nd Academy Awards.

== Plot ==
For three years, Nicky has resided in Milan with his partner Picchio, away from his sister Marta, a charismatic former opera singer who lives in their parents' villa in Veneto with the elderly governess Caterina. Also sharing the villa are Anna, a distant relative, and Claudia, a timid teacher seeking solace with Marta.

During a visit to the villa, Nicky finds himself immersed in memories of his youth. Upon Picchio's arrival, they discreetly maintain their relationship. The group enjoys a delightful evening at the local trattoria, where Nicky reconnects with a childhood friend, and Marta is invited to sing, despite the strain it puts on her due to her heart condition, which she conceals. They plan a trip to Venice for the following day, but tragedy strikes when Marta suffers a fatal heart attack.

Devastated by Marta's death, Anna and Claudia confront their pasts and fears. Anna, who once had a romantic involvement with Claudia, develops feelings for Picchio, only to be rebuffed. Eventually, with Marta gone, Anna and Claudia muster the courage to leave behind their old lives and accompany Picchio to Milan to begin anew. Meanwhile, Nicky opts to remain indefinitely in his childhood home.

== Cast ==
- Mariangela Melato as Anna
- Eleonora Giorgi as Claudia
- Erland Josephson as Nicky
- Nerina Montagnani as Caterina
- David Pontremoli as Picchio
- Hella Petri as Marta
- Fred Personne as Fossino
- Armando Brancia as Owner of restaurant

== Reception ==
=== Critical response ===
Roger Ebert in 1980, gave it 2.5 stars out of 4 and said "To Forget Venice doesn't feel like a story, it feels like an idea for a story, and that's the problem with it".

Derek Winnert in 2019 gave it 5 stars out of 5 and said "To Forget Venice [Dimenticare Venezia] is a poignant, telling, superb movie, based on a story by Franco Brusati, which was deservedly Oscar nominated as Best Foreign Language Film in 1979. By rights, it should have won".

=== Awards and nominations ===
- Academy Award nominee: Best Foreign Film
- David di Donatello: Best Film
- Nastro d'Argento: Best Actress (Mariangela Melato)

== See also ==
- List of submissions to the 52nd Academy Awards for Best Foreign Language Film
- List of Italian submissions for the Academy Award for Best Foreign Language Film
- List of Italian films of 1979
