= Silvio Spaccesi =

Italian actor (1926–2015)

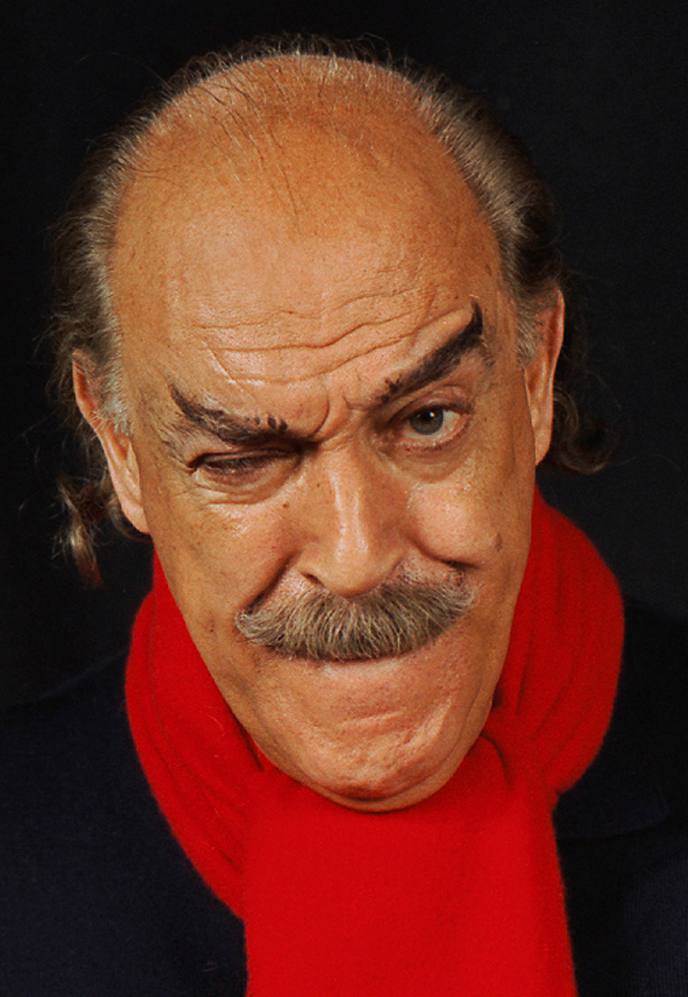
- Spaccesi in 1997
- Born: 1 August 1926; Macerata, Italy
- Died: 2 June 2015 (aged 88); Rome, Italy
- Occupations: Actor; voice actor
- Years active: 1955–2015
- Partner(s): Rosaura Marchi (1985–2015)

Silvio Spaccesi (1 August 1926 – 2 June 2015) was an Italian actor and voice actor.

== Biography ==
Born in Macerata, Spaccesi studied in a Salesians of Don Bosco School, and made his official theatrical debut with the stage company held by Angelo Perugini. After moving to Rome, he formed at the Silvio d’Amico Academy of Dramatic Arts. He was best known for the musical comedy Forza venite gente, in which he played the role of Pietro di Bernardone, Francis of Assisi's father.

Spaccesi was also active as a voice actor and a dubber. He voiced Yoda in the Italian versions of the Star Wars original trilogy and Santa Claus in The Nightmare Before Christmas. He was also the Italian voice of Orville in the 1977 Disney film The Rescuers and the second voice of Barney Rubble in The Flintstones. Spaccesi often dubbed actors such as Gustav Knuth, Charles Durning, Frank Oz and Jack Warden in a select number of their films.

== Death ==
Spaccesi died in Rome on June 2, 2015, at the age of 88 just a few days after the death of his partner Rosaura Marchi.

== Filmography ==
=== Cinema ===
- Adriana Lecouvreur (1955)
- In Prison Awaiting Trial (1972) - Maresciallo
- Aretino's Blue Stories (1972) - Cecco
- Aretino's Stories of the Three Lustful Daughters (1972) - Cecco
- Come fu che Masuccio Salernitano, fuggendo con le brache in mano, riuscì a conservarlo sano (1972) - Swindler
- They Were Called Three Musketeers But They Were Four (1973) - King Louis XIII
- Il colonnello Buttiglione diventa generale (1974) - General Damigiani
- La minorenne (1974) - The Uncle Priest
- The Immortal Bachelor (1975) - Lawyer
- Café Express (1980) - Giuseppe Sanguigno
- Il carabiniere (1981) - Don Saverio
- Segni particolari: bellissimo (1983) - Priest
- Mezzo destro mezzo sinistro - 2 calciatori senza pallone (1985) - President Beccaceci
- Italians in Rio (1987) - Romolo Cococcia
- Anni 90: Parte II (1993) - Bastiano Ciccone
- Package, Double Package and Counterpackage (1993) - Nicola Settimelli
- Keys in Hand (1996) - Judge

== Dubbing roles ==
=== Animation ===
- Orville in The Rescuers
- Santa Claus in The Nightmare Before Christmas
- Barney Rubble in The Flintstones (2nd voice)
- Bashful in Snow White and the Seven Dwarfs (1972 redub)
- Puggsy in Tom and Jerry: The Movie
- Bonan in Dog of Flanders
- James Bloggs in When the Wind Blows
- Larry in The New Three Stooges

=== Live action ===
- Yoda in Star Wars: Episode V – The Empire Strikes Back
- Yoda in Star Wars: Episode VI – Return of the Jedi
- Doc Hopper in The Muppet Movie
- Glenn Purcell in Airport 1975
- Oren Trask in Working Girl
- King of Swamp Castle in Monty Python and the Holy Grail
- Ed Traxler in The Terminator
- Colonel Erhardt To Be or Not to Be
- Mickey Morrissey in The Verdict
- Big Ben Healy in Problem Child
- Blindman in Young Frankenstein
- Mr. Tarkanian in The Great Muppet Caper
- Mr. Wing in Gremlins
- Mr. Wing / Janitor in Gremlins 2: The New Batch
- Ghost of Christmas Present in The Muppet Christmas Carol
- Gilbert of Glockenspur in Dragonheart
- Gale Snoats in Raising Arizona
- James Gordon in Batman
- Charles Dreyfus in Revenge of the Pink Panther
- Brett in Alien
- Sergeant Hulka in Stripes
- Uncle Walt in Twilight Zone: The Movie
- Hoagy in Pete's Dragon
- Jacobs in Alice Doesn't Live Here Anymore
- Eli Sands in The Concorde ... Airport '79
- Christie in The Quatermass Xperiment
- Mr. Emerson in A Room with a View
- Frank Alexander in A Clockwork Orange
- Saburo Kurusu in Tora! Tora! Tora!
- Miracle Max in The Princess Bride
- Mr. Mushnik in Little Shop of Horrors
- Thomas Davies in Roots
