= Teresa the Thief =

- Directed by: Carlo Di Palma
- Written by: Age & Scarpelli; Dacia Maraini
- Cinematography: Dario Di Palma
- Edited by: Ruggero Mastroianni
- Music by: Riz Ortolani
- Release date: 1973
- Language: Italian

Teresa the Thief (Italian: Teresa la ladra) is a 1973 commedia all'italiana film directed by Carlo Di Palma. It is based on the novel Memorie di una ladra written by Dacia Maraini in 1972.

== Cast ==
- Monica Vitti: Teresa
- Stefano Satta Flores: Ercoletto
- Michele Placido: Tonino Santità
- Carlo Delle Piane: Occhilustri
- Denise Peron
- Luciana Turina
- Isa Danieli
- Geraldine Hooper
- Fiorenzo Fiorentini
- Anna Bonaiuto
- Armando Brancia
- Franco Diogene
