= The Pizza Triangle =

1970 film by Ettore Scola

- Theatrical release poster
- Italian: Dramma della gelosia (tutti i particolari in cronaca)
- Directed by: Ettore Scola
- Screenplay by: Age & Scarpelli; Ettore Scola
- Story by: Age & Scarpelli
- Produced by: Pio Angeletti; Adriano De Micheli
- Starring: Marcello Mastroianni; Monica Vitti; Giancarlo Giannini
- Cinematography: Carlo Di Palma
- Edited by: Alberto Gallitti
- Music by: Armando Trovajoli
- Production companies: Dean Film; Juppiter Generale Cinematografica; Midega Film
- Distributed by: Titanus (Italy); Warner Bros. (Spain)
- Release dates: 18 January 1970 (Sweden); 30 April 1970 (Italy); 7 December 1970 (Spain)
- Running time: 107 minutes
- Countries: Italy; Spain
- Language: Italian

The Pizza Triangle (Italian: Dramma della gelosia (tutti i particolari in cronaca), lit. 'Drama of Jealousy (All the Details in the News)'), also released as A Drama of Jealousy (and Other Things) and Jealousy, Italian Style, is a 1970 romantic comedy-drama film directed by Ettore Scola, who co-wrote the screenplay with the screenwriter duo of Age & Scarpelli. It stars Marcello Mastroianni, Monica Vitti and Giancarlo Giannini. Spanish actors Manuel Zarzo and Juan Diego were dubbed into Italian.

== Plot ==
At Festa de l'Unità in Rome, a florist named Adelaide Ciafrocchi meets Oreste Nardi, a middle-aged communist bricklayer. She tells him that she once saw him passing her flower stand at the Campo Verano cemetery, and they fall in love, despite the fact that he is married to the much older Antonia. Upon discovering the affair, Antonia confronts Adelaide at her flower stand. When Adelaide vehemently refuses to leave Oreste and mistakes Antonia for his mother, Antonia physically attacks Adelaide, who ends up hospitalised. Visiting Adelaide at the hospital, Oreste excitedly tells her that they are free to be together now that he has left Antonia.

While dining with Oreste at a pizzeria, Adelaide catches the attention of a young Tuscan pizza chef, Nello Serafini, who sends her a heart-shaped pizza. Oreste and Nello later bond after they both attend a PCI protest march. Oreste formally introduces Nello to Adelaide, and the three soon become inseparable friends. Adelaide begins an affair with Nello, but finds herself torn between the two men as she loves both. After seeing Adelaide and Nello in bed together, a vengeful Oreste takes her to the pizzeria where Nello works and publicly exposes their affair, causing a scene. Adelaide expresses no remorse, prompting Oreste to beat her, and she is hospitalised for the second time.

Adelaide undergoes psychoanalysis to discuss her obsession with both Oreste and Nello. Overcome with guilt, she attempts suicide by inhaling gas and is rushed to the hospital for the third time. Still unable to choose between Oreste and Nello, Adelaide proposes a threesome, but the men end up fighting and she abandons both of them. On the advice of her older sister Silvana, a prostitute, Adelaide begins a relationship with a wealthy and crude butcher, Ambleto, for the purpose of marriage, but she eventually leaves him to reconcile with Nello, who has attempted suicide because of her.

In a desperate attempt to win Adelaide back, Oreste, who is now unemployed, pleads with a Gypsy couple to cast a love spell, to no avail. Shortly after their wedding, Adelaide and Nello drive by Oreste as he sleeps in a street market. Nello stops to talk to Oreste, who becomes angry when he realises that Adelaide and Nello have married without telling him. The newlyweds attempt to drive off, but the car will not start. Oreste pulls Nello out of the car and beats him with a stick. To defend himself, Nello attacks Oreste with a pair of shears. In the ensuing chaos, Oreste grabs hold of the shears and inadvertently stabs Adelaide. As she dies, she declares that she loves Oreste more.

Using the insanity defense, Oreste is sentenced to five years in prison and two years in an insane asylum. After serving his sentence, he wanders around the city and, now completely out of his mind, engages in imaginary conversations with his beloved Adelaide, convinced that he will always have her by his side.

== Cast ==
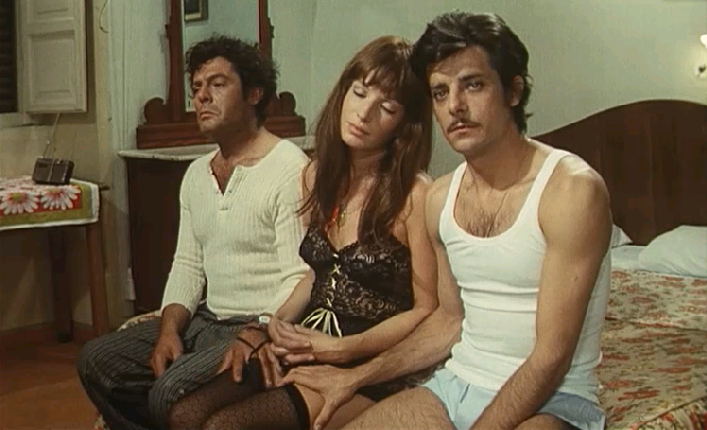
Marcello Mastroianni, Monica Vitti and Giancarlo Giannini in The Pizza Triangle

- Marcello Mastroianni as Oreste Nardi
- Monica Vitti as Adelaide Ciafrocchi
- Giancarlo Giannini as Nello Serafini
- Manuel Zarzo (credited as Manolo Zarzo) as Ughetto
- Marisa Merlini as Silvana Ciafrocchi
- Hercules Cortez as Ambleto Di Meo
- Fernando Sánchez Polack as district head of Communist Party
- Gioia Desideri as Adelaide's friend
- Juan Diego as Antonia's son
- Bruno Scipioni as pizzaiolo
- Josefina Serratosa as Antonia
- Giuseppe Maffioli as lawyer
- Corrado Gaipa as judge
- Paola Natale as flower seller
- Brizio Montinaro as restaurant night guard
- Nerina Montagnani as Adelaide's old colleague

== Accolades ==
Marcello Mastroianni won the Best Actor award at the 1970 Cannes Film Festival.
