= I See Naked =

- Directed by: Dino Risi
- Written by: Dino Risi; Iaia Fiastri; Ruggero Maccari; Fabio Carpi; Bernardino Zapponi
- Starring: Nino Manfredi; Sylva Koscina; Enrico Maria Salerno
- Music by: Armando Trovajoli
- Release date: 17 April 1969
- Country: Italy
- Language: Italian

I See Naked (Italian: Vedo nudo) is a 1969 Italian anthology comedy film directed by Dino Risi. All the episodes have sex as the main theme and all star Nino Manfredi, who plays seven different characters. The film represents the last collaboration between Manfredi and Risi, after Treasure of San Gennaro and Torture Me But Kill Me with Kisses. For this film Manfredi was awarded with a David di Donatello for Best Actor.

Vedo nudo gained a huge commercial success, and was followed by two unofficial sequels, Sessomatto and Sesso e volentieri, both directed by Risi.

== Cast ==
- Nino Manfredi: Cacopardo / Angelo Perfili / Ercole / Voyeur / Phone-technician / Maurizio / Nanni
- Sylva Koscina: The Diva
- Enrico Maria Salerno: Carlo Alberto Rinaldo
- Nerina Montagnani: Old farmer
- Véronique Vendell: Manuela
- Daniela Giordano: Luisa
- Umberto D'Orsi: Federico
- Luca Sportelli: Colleague of Ercole

== Production ==
The film originally consisted solely of what would become its final segment; Nino Manfredi doubted the story could sustain a feature-length film and involved in the project screenwriter Iaia Fiastri to help develop a solution. She eventually suggested to turn the film into an anthology, providing several episode-based ideas.

== Reception ==
The film was a massive success, grossing over 2 billion lire at the Italian box office.
