= People of Rome (film) =

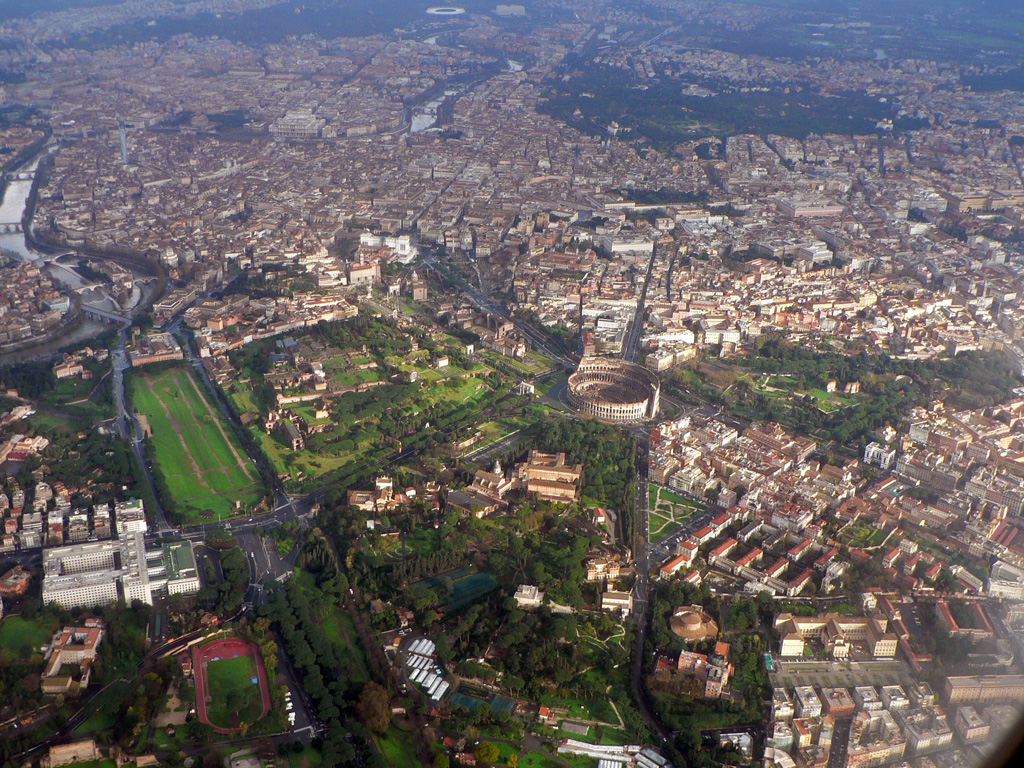
- Directed by: Ettore Scola
- Written by: Ettore Scola; Paola Scola; Silvia Scola
- Cinematography: Franco Di Giacomo
- Edited by: Raimondo Crociani
- Music by: Armando Trovajoli
- Release date: October 31, 2003
- Running time: 100 minutes
- Country: Italy
- Language: Italian

People of Rome (Italian: Gente di Roma) is a 2003 Italian comedy mockumentary film directed by Ettore Scola. It is close to Federico Fellini's Roma.

The film is dedicated to Alberto Sordi, whom Scola had wanted to cast as a nobleman in the final scene. Sordi died before this could come to pass.

Scola's daughters co-wrote the script.

== Plot ==
Rome 2003, the camera follows citizens of Rome. Night, in a flat, a woman prepares her husband's lunch. The man takes a bus, but the camera follow another bus ... a woman cleans the mayor's office... A man interviews passengers on a bus about immigration...... the owner of a bar is racist person... a survivor woman of Holocaust remembers the Ghetto deportation... deportation that is filmed by a director... Stefania Sandrelli plays with her grand daughter in a park a man tries to seduce the bus driver...gay night life... sunrise at Piazza Navona, a noble man and a tramp are sitting together.
