= Blonde in Black Leather =

1975 film

Qui comincia l'avventura
- Directed by: Carlo Di Palma
- Produced by: Franco Cristaldi
- Starring: Claudia Cardinale; Monica Vitti
- Cinematography: Dario Di Palma
- Edited by: Ruggero Mastroianni
- Music by: Riz Ortolani
- Distributed by: United Artists Europa
- Release date: 1975
- Country: Italy
- Language: Italian

Qui comincia l'avventura, also known as 'Lucky Girls' and Blonde in Black Leather in its English-language version, is a 1975 Italian action comedy film. It stars Claudia Cardinale and Monica Vitti.

== Plot ==
Miele, a motorcyclist who claims to have a mobster boyfriend and is prone to pathological lying, convinces Laura, a dissatisfied laundress, to leave her job and husband, and go on a road trip with her. Over the course of their travels, Laura sees through Miele's outsized behavior and becomes a force of reason, her senses helping them escape fraught situations.

== Cast ==
- Monica Vitti: Miele
- Claudia Cardinale: Laura
- Ninetto Davoli: the acrobat / the angel / the devil
- Guido Leontini: Laura's husband
