= Gianfranco Barra =

Italian actor (1940–2025)

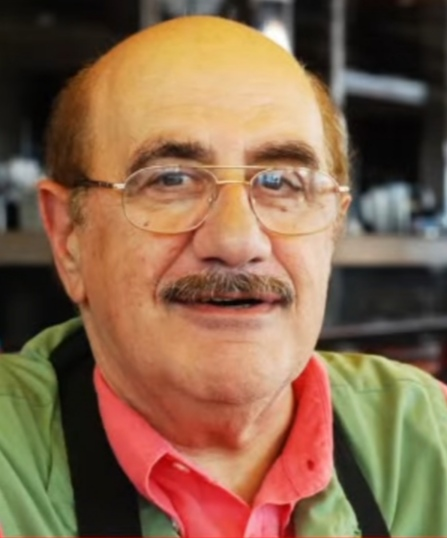
- Barra in 2012
- Born: 5 April 1940; Rome, Italy
- Died: 23 March 2025 (aged 84); Rome, Italy
- Occupation: Actor
- Years active: 1968–2025
- Height: 1.66 m (5 ft 5 in)

Gianfranco Barra (5 April 1940 – 23 March 2025) was an Italian actor. He appeared in more than 80 films, mainly as a character actor. Born in Rome, Barra studied at the Silvio d’Amico Academy of Dramatic Arts in his hometown. First active on stage, he made his film debut in 1968. He was also active on television, in commercials, and as a playwright. Barra died in Rome on 23 March 2025, at the age of 84.

== Selected filmography ==
- Avanti! (1972)
- The Seduction of Mimi (1972)
- Dirty Weekend (1973)
- Bread and Chocolate (1973)
- Black Holiday (1973)
- Policewoman (1974)
- Il lumacone (1974)
- Playing the Field (1974)
- The Mazurka of the Baron, the Saint and the Early Fig Tree (1975)
- La polizia accusa: il Servizio Segreto uccide (1975)
- The Suspicious Death of a Minor (1975)
- La professoressa di scienze naturali (1976)
- Double Murder (1977)
- The Virgo, the Taurus and the Capricorn (1977)
- I nuovi mostri (1977)
- L'altra metà del cielo (1977)
- Goodnight, Ladies and Gentlemen (1978)
- A Policewoman on the Porno Squad (1979)
- Sugar, Honey and Pepper (1980)
- Prickly Pears (1981)
- Banana Joe (1982)
- Scorpion with Two Tails (1982)
- Eccezzziunale... veramente (1982)
- Sapore di mare 2 (1983)
- Zero in condotta (1983)
- It's Happening Tomorrow (1988)
- What if Gargiulo Finds Out? (1988)
- The Gamble (1988)
- The Invisible Wall (1991)
- Flight of the Innocent (1992)
- Acquitted for Having Committed the Deed (1992)
- Giovanni Falcone (1993)
- The Talented Mr. Ripley (1999)
- Screw Loose (1999)
- The Jokes (2004)
- A Dinner for Them to Meet (2007)
