= On My Way to the Crusades, I Met a Girl Who... =

1967 film by Pasquale Festa Campanile

- Italian theatrical release poster
- Italian: La cintura di castità
- Directed by: Pasquale Festa Campanile
- Screenplay by: Luigi Magni; Larry Gelbart; Ettore Giannini (Note: Dialogue revision)
- Story by: Ugo Liberatore
- Produced by: Francesco Mazzei
- Starring: Tony Curtis; Monica Vitti; Ivo Garrani; Hugh Griffith; John Richardson; Nino Castelnuovo
- Cinematography: Carlo Di Palma
- Edited by: Gabrio Astori
- Music by: Riz Ortolani
- Production company: Julia Film
- Distributed by: Titanus
- Release date: 26 October 1967 (Italy)
- Running time: 93 minutes
- Country: Italy
- Languages: Italian; English

On My Way to the Crusades, I Met a Girl Who... (Italian: La cintura di castità), also known as The Chastity Belt, is a 1967 Italian historical comedy film directed by Pasquale Festa Campanile and starring Tony Curtis, Monica Vitti, Ivo Garrani, Hugh Griffith, John Richardson and Nino Castelnuovo. It was released theatrically in Italy on 26 October 1967 by Titanus and in the United States on 10 September 1969 by Warner Bros.-Seven Arts.

== Synopsis ==
A knight is forced to leave for the crusades without having had time to consummate his marriage with a beautiful woman. As was custom during the period, he applies a chastity belt to his bride.

== Cast ==
- Monica Vitti as Boccadoro
- Tony Curtis as Guerrando
- Hugh Griffith as Ibn-El-Rashid
- John Richardson as Dragone
- Ivo Garrani as Duca Pandolfo
- Nino Castelnuovo as Marculfo
- Francesco Mulé as Rienzi
- Franco Sportelli as Bertuccio
- Gabriella Giorgelli as lady-in-waiting
- Umberto Raho as monk
- Leopoldo Trieste as fisherman

== Production ==
The film was based on "The Chastity Belt" from Giovanni Boccaccio's The Decameron. It was originally titled The Wrong Key. Filming took place in Rome in November 1966. During filming, the title was changed to On My Way to the Crusades, I Met a Girl Who... Location shooting was done around Bracciano, particularly at Castello Orsini-Odescalchi.

== Release ==
The film took a number of years before being released in the United States. It opened in San Francisco on 10 September 1969.

=== Home media ===
On 27 February 2018, the film was released on DVD under its alternate title The Chastity Belt by Warner Archive Collection.
