= Necessary Love =

- Directed by: Fabio Carpi
- Written by: Fabio Carpi; Guillaume Chpaltine
- Produced by: André Djaoui; Mario Orfini; Giovanna Romagnoli
- Starring: Ben Kingsley; Marie-Christine Barrault
- Cinematography: Fabio Cianchetti
- Edited by: Alfredo Muschietti
- Release date: 1991
- Running time: 90 minutes
- Language: Italian

Necessary Love (Italian: L'amore necessario) is a 1991 Italian comedy-drama film written and directed by Fabio Carpi. It was screened in competition at the 48th Venice International Film Festival.

== Cast ==
- Ben Kingsley as Ernesto
- Marie-Christine Barrault as Valentina
- Ann-Gisel Glass as Diana
- Malcolm Conrath as Giacomo
- Silvia Mocci as Maddalena
- Geoffrey Bayldon as Bernardo
- Maria Laborit as Macha
- Marie-Laurence as Sofia
- Néstor Garay as Mr. Valeri
- Francesco Carnelutti as the doctor
