= Tigers in Lipstick =

1979 film

- Film poster
- Directed by: Luigi Zampa
- Written by: Luis Castro; Tonino Guerra; Giorgio Salvioni
- Produced by: Giorgio Salvioni
- Starring: Ursula Andress, Laura Antonelli, Sylvia Kristel, Monica Vitti
- Cinematography: Armando Nannuzzi; Giuseppe Ruzzolini
- Edited by: Franco Fraticelli
- Music by: Riz Ortolani
- Release date: 1979
- Running time: 97 minutes
- Countries: Italy, Spain
- Language: Italian
- Box office: 156,588 admissions (France)

Tigers in Lipstick (Italian: Letti selvaggi) is a 1979 Italian comedy film directed by Luigi Zampa, starring Ursula Andress, Laura Antonelli, Sylvia Kristel and Monica Vitti. It was Zampa's final film. It is an anthology of 8 unrelated vignettes, each involving a very attractive woman. The four lead actresses star in two vignettes each.

== Plot ==
A woman lures a man into her room for a mysterious purpose; a schoolboy gets a prostitute to pretend to be his mother at an interview with the school principal; a reporter's interview with a recent widow takes an unusual turn; a woman finds a permanent way to end her husband's jealousy; a woman finds her husband unenduringly boring; a woman tries to recover a stolen necklace she herself just stole; a woman causes traffic accidents by seductively distracting male drivers; a shy orchestra conductor has his tryst with a businesswoman constantly interrupted.

== Cast ==
- Ursula Andress as The Stroller / The Widow
- Laura Antonelli as The Wife / The Businesswoman
- Sylvia Kristel as The Lady on the Bed / The Unhappy Wife
- Monica Vitti as Maria, the fake mother / The Thief
- Orazio Orlando as Fioroni / The Arab
- Michele Placido as Angelo / The Photographer
- José Sacristán as The Musician
- Roberto Benigni as The Principal
- Enrico Beruschi as The Professor
- José Luis López Vázquez as Garage Owner
