= The Pacifist (film) =

1970 Italian-French-German drama film

- Directed by: Miklós Jancsó
- Written by: Giovanna Gagliardo
- Produced by: Sergio Gobbi
- Starring: Monica Vitti
- Cinematography: Carlo Di Palma
- Music by: Giorgio Gaslini
- Release date: 1970
- Language: French

The Pacifist (Italian: La pacifista) is a 1970 Italian-French-German drama film directed by Miklós Jancsó.

== Cast ==
- Monica Vitti as Barbara
- Pierre Clémenti as "The Stranger"
- Peter Pasetti as Commissioner
- Piero Faggioni as Piero
- Gino Lavagetto as Carlo
