= Kill the Fatted Calf and Roast It =

- Directed by: Salvatore Samperi
- Written by: Salvatore Samperi; Dacia Maraini
- Cinematography: Franco Di Giacomo
- Edited by: Franco Arcalli
- Music by: Ennio Morricone
- Release date: 1970
- Running time: 92 minutes
- Country: Italy
- Language: Italian

Uccidete il vitello grasso e arrostitelo (internationally released as Kill the Fatted Calf and Roast It) is a 1970 Italian giallo film directed by Salvatore Samperi.

== Plot ==
A young man returns home from his father's funeral, after which he begins to think his brother Cesare and his sister Verde are both plotting to murder him.

== Cast ==
- Marilù Tolo as Verde
- Jean Sorel as Cesare Merlo
- Gigi Ballista as Il Medico
- Maurizio Degli Esposti as Enrico Merlo
- Pier Paolo Capponi as Detective
