= Man and Wife (1970 film) =

- Directed by: Mario Monicelli; Alberto Sordi; Vittorio De Sica
- Cinematography: Carlo Di Palma; Ennio Guarnieri; Sante Achilli
- Edited by: Ruggero Mastroianni; Franco Fraticelli
- Music by: Manuel De Sica; Enzo Jannacci; Piero Piccioni
- Release date: 1970
- Country: Italy
- Language: Italian

Man and Wife (Italian: Le coppie, lit. 'The Couples') is a 1970 Italian comedy film directed by Mario Monicelli, Alberto Sordi and Vittorio De Sica. It consists of three segments.

== Cast ==
=== Il frigorifero ===
- Monica Vitti: Adele Puddu
- Enzo Jannacci: Gavino Puddu

=== La camera ===
- Alberto Sordi: Giacinto Colonna
- Rossana Di Lorenzo: his wife Erminia
- Shamsuddin Abul Kalam : university teacher of Sardinia

=== Il leone ===
- Alberto Sordi: Antonio
- Monica Vitti: Giulia
- Gigi Bonos: Owner of the circus

== Legacy ==
In the 1972 film Play It Again, Sam, shot in San Francisco, a poster for Le coppie is seen outside of a neighborhood theater.
