= Iaia Fiastri =

Italian screenwriter (1934–2018)

Jaja Fiastri
- Born: Maria Grazia Pacelli; 15 September 1934; Rome, Italy
- Died: 28 December 2018 (aged 84); Rome, Italy
- Other name: Iaia Fiastri
- Occupations: Screenwriter, songwriter
- Years active: 1964–1997

Jaja Fiastri or Iaia Fiastri (born Maria Grazia Pacelli; 15 September 1934 – 28 December 2018) was an Italian screenwriter.

== Biography ==
Fiastri began her screenwriting career in the early 1960s, co-writing the 1964 comedy film Love and Marriage, and was later involved in the writing of films directed by Franco Brusati, Dino Risi, Luciano Salce, Steno and others, being a close collaborator of screenwriters Pietro Garinei and Sandro Giovannini.

Fiastri was also a songwriter: she wrote two songs for Caterina Caselli and collaborated with composer Bruno Canfora in the production of the play Amori miei (My Loves).

Fiastri died in Rome on 28 December 2018, at the age of 84.

== Partial filmography ==
- Love and Marriage (1964)
- I See Naked (1969)
- Basta guardarla (1970)
- White Sister (1972)
- When Women Lost Their Tails (1972)
- Bread and Chocolate (1974)
- Amori miei (1978)
- To Forget Venice (1979)
- I Don't Understand You Anymore (1980)
- Mamma Ebe (1985)
- Via Montenapoleone (1987)
