= Gli ordini sono ordini =

- Italian theatrical release poster
- Directed by: Franco Giraldi
- Written by: Tonino Guerra; Ruggero Maccari
- Starring: Monica Vitti
- Cinematography: Carlo Di Palma
- Edited by: Raimondo Crociani
- Music by: Fred Bongusto
- Release date: 1972
- Running time: 96 minutes
- Country: Italy
- Language: Italian

Gli ordini sono ordini ("Orders Are Orders") is a 1972 Italian comedy film directed by Franco Giraldi.

== Plot ==
Giorgia is an unhappy housewife tired of her marriage to her husband Amedeo, when she begins to hear a voice that orders her to perform out of the ordinary and transgressive actions. One day the voice orders her to go to the seafront and make love with a lifeguard. Confessed the betrayal to her husband, he puts her out of the house.

Giorgia thus finds herself alone and has to reorganize her life. After visiting her mother, who advises her to return with her husband, she goes to live in a hotel instead. Here she meets Nancy, a researcher who works for an important record company, who takes care of recording traditional music with her own recorder.

Giorgia later meets the artist Mario Pasini, falls in love with him, but soon their relationship also begins to creak and she hears her voice. On top of that Mario cheats on her with Nancy. Giorgia then abandons the two, but ends up running into a thug who, giving her a ride in his car, goes off the road to escape the police chase and the car overturns.

Giorgia ends up in the hospital. When her husband Amedeo comes out to wait for her, who proposes to her to come back together, but Giorgia has now decided to continue on her own path and live an independent life.

== Cast ==
- Monica Vitti as Giorgia
- Orazio Orlando Amedeo
- Gigi Proietti as Mario Pasini
- Claudine Auger as Giorgia's friend
- Luigi Diberti as Rodolfo Baroni
- Corrado Pani as Gangster
- Carlo Bagno
- Elsa Vazzoler

== See also ==
- List of Italian films of 1972
