= Carlo Di Palma =

Italian cinematographer

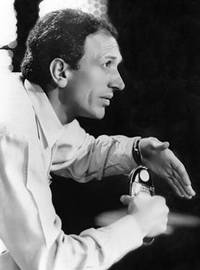
- Born: 17 April 1925; Rome, Italy
- Died: 9 July 2004 (aged 79); Rome, Italy
- Occupations: Cinematographer, film director
- Years active: 1942–2001
- Spouse: Adriana Chiesa

Carlo Di Palma (17 April 1925 – 9 July 2004) was an Italian cinematographer and film director, renowned for his work with directors Michelangelo Antonioni and Woody Allen. The Lincoln Center described him as "among the most lauded and influential of cinematographers."

== Early life ==
Di Palma was born into a poor Roman family; his mother was a flower seller on the Spanish Steps, while his father was a camera operator for a number of Italian film studios.

In an interview shortly before his death, Di Palma recounted his childhood memories of observing his father in action: "I'd run to the studio or the location, and watch my father work. I was fascinated by the whole experience. I would stand on a crate sometimes and watch. All of the people that were on the location were pleasant to me. I was very quiet and observant, so with that they let me stay on set. I would watch many different directors over and over."

== Career ==
Aside from his career as a cinematographer, Di Palma was also a little-known film director.

In 2002, Di Palma was hired to shoot Woody Allen's film Anything Else (2003), and actually started location scouting before failing an insurance physical, which was required for all key personnel on the crew. Because of that, Darius Khondji replaced Di Palma, to his great disappointment, as he had been eager to work again after having been on the sidelines for the past six years.

== Personal life ==
Di Palma moved to the United States in 1983.

Around the same time, he married Adriana Chiesa, an exporter of Italian films. She nursed him through his final years.

== Filmography ==
=== Cinematographer ===
==== Film ====
Year	Title	Director	Notes
1957	Lauta mancia	Fabio De Agostini	
1960	The Employee	Gianni Puccini	
1960	Long Night in 1943	Florestano Vancini	
1960	Le svedesi	Gian Luigi Polidoro	
1961	The Assassin	Elio Petri	
1961	Tiro al piccione	Giuliano Montaldo	
1961	Divorce Italian Style	Pietro Germi	With Leonida Barboni
1961	Leoni al sole	Vittorio Caprioli	
1962	Paris, My Love	Vittorio Caprioli	
1962	Terrible Sheriff	Alberto De Martino; Antonio Momplet	With Dario Di Palma and Ricardo Torres
1963	Omicron	Ugo Gregoretti	
1964	Liolà	Alessandro Blasetti	With Leonida Barboni and Tonino Delli Colli
1964	Red Desert	Michelangelo Antonioni	
1964	The Naked Hours	Marco Vicario	
1965	Terror-Creatures from the Grave	Massimo Pupillo	
1966	For Love and Gold	Mario Monicelli	
1966	A Question of Honour	Luigi Zampa	With Luciano Trasatti
1966	Blowup	Michelangelo Antonioni	
1967	I Married You for Fun	Luciano Salce	
1967	On My Way to the Crusades, I Met a Girl Who...	Pasquale Festa Campanile	
1968	The Girl with the Pistol	Mario Monicelli	
1969	The Scarlet Lady	Jean Valère	
1969	The Appointment	Sidney Lumet	
1969	Help Me, My Love	Alberto Sordi	
1970	The Pizza Triangle	Ettore Scola	
1970	Ninì Tirabusciò, la donna che inventò la mossa	Marcello Fondato	
1970	The Pacifist	Miklós Jancsó	
1971	La supertestimone	Franco Giraldi	
1971	That's How We Women Are	Dino Risi	
1972	Gli ordini sono ordini	Franco Giraldi	
1979	Together?	Armenia Balducci	
1981	Tragedy of a Ridiculous Man	Bernardo Bertolucci	
1982	Identification of a Woman	Michelangelo Antonioni	
1983	The Black Stallion Returns	Robert Dalva	
1983	Gabriela	Bruno Barreto	
1986	Hannah and Her Sisters	Woody Allen	
1986	Off Beat	Michael Dinner	
1987	Radio Days	Woody Allen	
1987	The Secret of My Success	Herbert Ross	
1987	September	Woody Allen	
1990	Alice	Woody Allen	
1991	Shadows and Fog	Woody Allen	
1992	Husbands and Wives	Woody Allen	
1993	Manhattan Murder Mystery	Woody Allen	
1994	Bullets Over Broadway	Woody Allen	
1994	The Monster	Roberto Benigni	
1995	Mighty Aphrodite	Woody Allen	
1996	Everyone Says I Love You	Woody Allen	
1997	Deconstructing Harry	Woody Allen	

==== Short film ====
Year	Title	Director	Notes
1963	Le lièvre et la tortue	Alessandro Blasetti	Segment of Three Fables of Love
1965	Il provino	Michelangelo Antonioni	Segment of The Three Faces
1966	Fata Sabina	Luciano Salce	Segment of Sex Quartet
1970	Il frigorifero	Mario Monicelli	Segment of Man and Wife
1989	Roma	Michelangelo Antonioni	Segment of 12 registi per 12 città

==== Television ====
Year	Title	Director	Notes
1981	Great Performances	Jean-Pierre Ponnelle	Episode "La clemenza di Tito"
1983	Ritorno a Lisca Bianca	Michelangelo Antonioni	TV documentary short
1994	Don't Drink the Water	Woody Allen	TV movie

=== Director ===
- Teresa the Thief (1973)
- Blonde in Black Leather (1975) (Also writer)
- Mimì Bluette... fiore del mio giardino (1976)
- L'addio a Enrico Berlinguer (1984) (Documentary film)

== Awards and nominations ==
Year	Award	Category	Title	Result
1965	Silver Ribbon	Best Cinematography	Il deserto rosso	Won
1967	Silver Ribbon	Best Cinematography	For Love and Gold	Won
1993	Silver Ribbon	Best Cinematography	Shadows and Fog	Won
1997	Silver Ribbon	Best Cinematography	Mighty Aphrodite	Won
1966	BAFTA Awards	Best Cinematography - Colour	Blowup	Nominated
1982	David di Donatello	Best Cinematography	Identification of a Woman	Nominated
2003	European Film Awards	Outstanding European Achievement in World Cinema		Won
