= Mamoutou Touré =

Malian football administrator (born 1957)

- Born: Mamoutou Touré; 1 July 1957 (age 68); Bamako, Mali
- Occupations: Member, FIFA Council

Mamoutou Touré (born 1 July 1957) is a Malian football administrator who is a member of the FIFA Council in 2021. He has also been the president of the Malian Football Federation since August 2019.

In August 2023, he was arrested on suspicion of embezzlement of public funds and remanded in custody. That same month, he was re-elected as the president of the Malian football federation despite being in prison awaiting trial.
