= Polvere di stelle =

- Directed by: Alberto Sordi
- Written by: Ruggero Maccari; Bernardino Zapponi; Alberto Sordi
- Produced by: Fida
- Starring: Alberto Sordi; Monica Vitti; John Phillip Law
- Cinematography: Franco Di Giacomo
- Edited by: Raimondo Crociani
- Music by: Piero Piccioni
- Distributed by: CINERIZ - Rizzoli Film
- Release date: 1973 (Italy)
- Running time: 142 min 125 min (cut edition)
- Country: Italy
- Language: Italian

Polvere di stelle (Stardust) is a 1973 Italian film which was directed by Alberto Sordi. It starred Alberto Sordi and Monica Vitti.

== Plot ==
Mimmo Adami and Dea Dani are local professional dancers in the impoverished Italy of the Second World War. Their lives change suddenly as American soldiers stop in their town hoping to be entertained in accordance with the Broadway style. Effectively, they perform up to their expectations. However, as the army men have to march northward, the moment of glory of Mimmo and Dea finishes heartlessly.

== Cast ==
- Alberto Sordi: Mimmo Adami
- Monica Vitti: Dea Dani
- John Phillip Law: John
- Edoardo Faieta: Don Ciccio Caracioni
- Wanda Osiris: Herself
- Carlo Dapporto: Himself
- Franco Angrisano: Fascist Party Secretary
- Franca Scagnetti: Don Ciccio's Aunt

== Awards ==
- 1974 David di Donatello award for Best Actress: Monica Vitti
