= Néstor Garay =

Argentine actor (1931–2003)

- Born: 13 January 1931; Santa Rosa, La Pampa, Argentina
- Died: 11 April 2003 (aged 72); Loiano, Italy

Néstor Garay ( 13 January 1931 – 11 April 2003) was an Argentine actor, mainly active in Italy.

== Life and career ==
Born in Santa Rosa, La Pampa, Garay took up acting while studying at the University of Buenos Aires, before moving to Italy in the early 1960s. He got his first significant role in Pietro Germi's Serafino. A character actor, he specialized in playing figures of power and members of the clergy. Among his best popular roles, there was Sultan Abdullah in Sergio Sollima's The Tiger Is Still Alive: Sandokan to the Rescue. In 1981, Garay received a David di Donatello nomination for Best Supporting Actor for Mario Monicelli's Camera d'albergo.

Garay was also active on stage, in which he worked with prominent directors including Giorgio Strehler, Luca Ronconi, Luigi Squarzina, Giuseppe Patroni Griffi, Mario Missiroli, and Franco Enriquez. His last work was a stage production of María de Buenos Aires starring Milva. He died on 11 April 2003, at the age of 73; his death wasn't made public until May of that year.

== Selected filmography ==
- Serafino (1968)
- Execution (1968)
- Psychout for Murder (1969)
- Help Me, My Love (1969)
- Defeat of the Mafia (1970)
- The Mattei Affair (1972)
- The Hassled Hooker (1972)
- Allegro non troppo (1976)
- The Tiger Is Still Alive: Sandokan to the Rescue (1977)
- Prickly Pears (1980)
- Camera d'albergo (1981)
- Don't Play with Tigers (1982)
- Yes, Giorgio (1982)
- Spaghetti House (1982)
- Domani mi sposo (1984)
- Mother Ebe (1985)
- The Two Lives of Mattia Pascal (1985)
- I Am an ESP (1985)
- Stradivari (1988)
- Dark Illness (1990)
- Necessary Love (1991)
- Let's Not Keep in Touch (1994)
- Snowball (1995)
- The Comeback (2001)
