= The Story of a Poor Young Man (1995 film) =

1995 film by Ettore Scola

Romanzo di un giovane povero
- Directed by: Ettore Scola
- Written by: Ettore Scola; Giacomo Scarpelli
- Starring: Alberto Sordi; Rolando Ravello; Isabella Ferrari; André Dussollier
- Cinematography: Franco Di Giacomo
- Edited by: Raimondo Crociani
- Music by: Armando Trovajoli
- Release date: 1995
- Running time: 120 minutes
- Country: Italy
- Language: Italian

The Story of a Poor Young Man (Italian: Romanzo di un giovane povero) is a 1995 Italian crime drama film directed by Ettore Scola.

The film entered the 52nd Venice International Film Festival, where Isabella Ferrari was awarded with the Volpi Cup for best supporting actress.

Alberto Sordi's performance was awarded with the Grolla d'oro for best leading actor in 1995.

== Cast ==
- Alberto Sordi as Bartoloni
- Rolando Ravello as Vincenzo Persico
- Isabella Ferrari as Andreina
- André Dussollier as Deputy Prosecutor Moscati
- Sara Franchetti as Mother of Vincenzo
- Mario Carotenuto as Pieralisi
- Renato De Carmine as Lawyer Cantini
- Gianfelice Imparato as Moscati's assistant
