= Armando Brancia =

Italian actor (1917–1997)

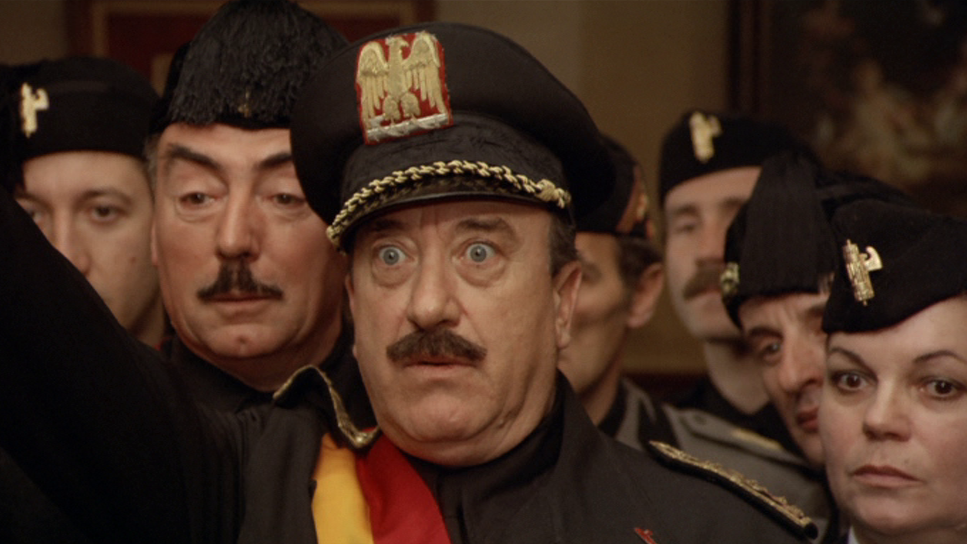
- Brancia in Ante Up (1974)
- Born: 9 September 1917; Naples, Italy
- Died: 20 June 1997 (aged 79); Lido di Lavinio, Italy
- Occupation: Actor

Armando Brancia (9 September 1917 – 20 June 1997) was an Italian film and television actor.

== Life and career ==
Born in Naples, Brancia started his acting career at a mature age playing some minor roles in several RAI TV-series. His breakout came in 1973, with the role of Aurelio Biondi in Federico Fellini's Amarcord. Following the critical and commercial success of the film, he started an intense career as a character actor working for notable directors including Luigi Comencini, Nanni Loy and Franco Brusati. He retired in the second half of the 1980s.

== Filmography ==
Year	Title	Role	Notes
1973	Teresa the Thief		
1973	Amarcord	Aurelio Biondi	
1974	Sistemo l'America e torno	Commendatore	
1974	Kidnap	Lawyer	
1974	Policewoman	Senatore Giuseppe Brembani	
1974	Ante Up	Mazzaturconi	
1975	Wanted: Babysitter	Inspector Carrara	
1975	Lips of Lurid Blue	Lupis, the voyeur	
1976	A Common Sense of Modesty	Mainardi	
1976	Colt 38 Special Squad	Questore	
1976	La linea del fiume	Giancarlo Rossetti	
1976	Vinella e Don Pezzotta	Don Pezzotta	
1976	Sex with a Smile II	Bernasconi, President	(Segment "La Squadra Di Calcio")
1977	The Conquest of the Citadel	Rodolfo Battipana	
1977	Wifemistress	Head Doctor	
1977	The Cat	Police Chief	
1978	Voglia di donna	Il prete	
1979	To Forget Venice	Owner of restaurant	
1980	Cocktail Molotov	Frederic's father	
1981	Cornetti alla crema	Cardinal Libotte	
1982	Grand Hotel Excelsior	Bertolazzi	
1984	Jocks	Cav. Remondini	
1987	Ternosecco	Capece	(final film role)
