= State Reasons =

- Directed by: André Cayatte
- Starring: Jean Yanne; Monica Vitti
- Cinematography: Armando Nannuzzi
- Music by: Vladimir Cosma
- Release date: 26 April 1978
- Language: French

State Reasons (French: La raison d'état, Italian: Ragione di stato) is a 1978 French-Italian political drama film written and directed by André Cayatte.

== Cast ==
- Jean Yanne: Jean-Philippe Leroi
- Monica Vitti: Angela Ravelli
- Michel Bouquet: Francis Jobin
- François Périer: Prof. Marrot
- Jean-Claude Bouillon: Bernard Moulin
- Georges Chamarat: Gardener
- Jean Rougerie: Prime Minister
- Jess Hahn: CIA Agent
- Hubert Gignoux: Minister of War
- Gabriel Jabbour: Meslam
- Michèle Lituac: Françoise
