= Valeria Valeri =

Italian actress (1921–2019)

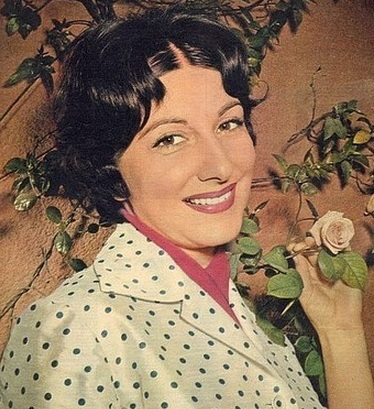
- Valeri in the magazine Radiocorriere (1959)
- Born: Valeria Tulli; 8 December 1921; Rome, Italy
- Died: 11 June 2019 (aged 97); Rome, Italy
- Occupations: Actress; voice actress
- Years active: 1949–2019
- Children: Chiara Salerno

Valeria Valeri (born Valeria Tulli; 8 December 1921 – 11 June 2019) was an Italian actress who specialized in films and dubbing.

== Biography ==
=== On stage ===
A student of actress Elsa Merlini, Valeri began her professional acting career in 1948, working on stage with fellow actors such as Gino Cervi, Ivo Garrani, Paolo Ferrari, Alberto Lupo, Alberto Lionello and Enrico Maria Salerno.

In 1958, Valeri joined the Compagnia Attori Associati, where she met Garrani and Salerno; with the latter she established a strong artistic and personal relationship. A tireless actress, from the mid-1990s, Valeri continued to perform on theatrical stages with dedication, mostly in light comedies.

=== Other activities ===
Valeri had a short career as a movie actress while acting in stage plays. She had a profitable career as a voice actress until 2008, giving her voice to actresses such as Julie Andrews, Ellen Burstyn, Natalie Wood, Maggie Smith and Anne Bancroft.

On the small screen, Valeri is remembered mainly for the one role that made her very popular in the 1960s: Mrs. Stoppani, mother of the restless Giannino Stoppani (portrayed by Rita Pavone) in the 1964 short series Il giornalino di Gian Burrasca, directed by Lina Wertmüller.

=== Personal life and death ===
Valeri was romantically engaged with Enrico Maria Salerno. The two had a daughter, Chiara, who is also an actress and a voice actress. On 1 December 2015, Valeri was inducted as an honorary citizen of Forlì.

Valeri died in Rome on 11 June 2019, at the age of 97, from natural causes.

== Filmography ==
=== Cinema ===
- Adriana Lecouvreur (1955)
- Lo scippo (1965)
- Seasons of Our Love (1966)
- Catherine and I (1980)

== Dubbing roles ==
=== Animation ===
- Mrs. Caloway in Home on the Range
- Queen Angella in He-Man and She-Ra: The Secret of the Sword

=== Live action ===
- Emily Barham in The Americanization of Emily
- Lady Felicity Marshwood in Relative Values
- Alice Hyatt in Alice Doesn't Live Here Anymore
- Maggie DuBois in The Great Race
- Dora Charleston in Murder by Death
- D. R. Cartwright in 7 Women
- Rhoda in A Fine Madness
- Miranda Sampson in Harper
- Monica in Indian Summer
- Evelyn Gromberg in It Runs in the Family
- Countess Elena Villani in Gangster's Law
- Mali in Disorder
- Countess Vitelleschi in Vanina Vanini
