= The Immortal Bachelor =

1975 film by Marcello Fondato

- Theatrical release poster
- Italian: A mezzanotte va la ronda del piacere
- Directed by: Marcello Fondato
- Written by: Marcello Fondato; Francesco Scardamaglia
- Produced by: Elio Scardamaglia
- Starring: Claudia Cardinale; Vittorio Gassman; Monica Vitti; Renato Pozzetto; Giancarlo Giannini
- Cinematography: Pasqualino De Santis
- Edited by: Sergio Montanari
- Music by: Guido and Maurizio De Angelis
- Production companies: Rizzoli Film; Delfo Cinematografica
- Distributed by: Cineriz
- Release date: 19 February 1975
- Running time: 100 minutes
- Country: Italy
- Language: Italian

The Immortal Bachelor (Italian: A mezzanotte va la ronda del piacere, lit. 'At Midnight the Pleasure Patrol Goes'), also known as Midnight Pleasures and Midnight Lovers, is a 1975 Italian comedy film co-written and directed by Marcello Fondato and starring Claudia Cardinale, Vittorio Gassman, Monica Vitti, Renato Pozzetto and Giancarlo Giannini. It tells the story of a cleaning woman who is accused of killing her husband and of a woman juror who hopes to save her.

== Plot ==
Without career or children after years of marriage to Andrea, an unscrupulous businessman, Gabriella is bored with her life. One morning she is summoned to the assize court to be the only female juror in the trial of Tina, a cleaner, accused of murdering her unemployed husband Gino.

Evidence and flashbacks reveal Tina's side of the story, from first meeting Gino to the night when she saw his body disappear into a sewer. Their relationship emerges as an unpredictable mixture of violent fights, heady sex, and periodic infidelities, yet it is clear she loves him still. Instinctively Gabriella feels Tina cannot be guilty, but cannot help contrasting the earthy vitality of the couple's precarious existence with her own comfortable but anaemic life from which love and sex have faded.

When it seems nothing will save Tina, she mentions a rich lover whose identity she had been protecting and who had been able to see the fight in which Gino fell to his death. From the incomplete description, Gabriella realises that it is her husband Andrea. She tries to make him testify, but he swiftly leaves the country. Just as the jurors reach a verdict of guilty, Gabriella having abstained, a surprise witness appears. It is Gino, alive after all and accusing Tina of abandoning the marital home (a shack beside the sea). The two pick up where they left off, fighting and making love.

== Cast ==
- Claudia Cardinale as Gabriella
- Vittorio Gassman as Andrea
- Renato Pozzetto as Fulvio
- Monica Vitti as Tina
- Giancarlo Giannini as Gino
- Silvio Spaccesi as lawyer
