= Duck in Orange Sauce =

1975 film by Luciano Salce

- Theatrical release film
- Italian: L'anatra all'arancia
- Directed by: Luciano Salce
- Screenplay by: Bernardino Zapponi
- Based on: The Secretary Bird by: William Douglas-Home; Marc-Gilbert Sauvajon
- Produced by: Mario Cecchi Gori
- Starring: Ugo Tognazzi; Monica Vitti; Barbara Bouchet; John Richardson
- Cinematography: Franco Di Giacomo
- Edited by: Antonio Siciliano
- Music by: Armando Trovajoli
- Production company: Capital Film
- Distributed by: Cineriz
- Release date: 20 December 1975 (Italy)
- Running time: 106 minutes (theatrical)
- Country: Italy
- Language: Italian

Duck in Orange Sauce (Italian: L'anatra all'arancia) is a 1975 Italian comedy film directed by Luciano Salce from a screenplay by Bernardino Zapponi, based on the 1968 play The Secretary Bird by William Douglas-Home (adapted in French by Marc-Gilbert Sauvajon). For this film, Monica Vitti was awarded with a David di Donatello for Best Actress and with a Silver Ribbon in the same category. The film is named for the culinary dish duck à l'orange.

== Plot ==
When the wife wants to leave her husband in preference of a romantic Frenchman, the husband seemingly does not raise difficulties and invites his rival, along with his own secretary, for a weekend. His real purpose is to win his wife back through an elaborate plan.

== Cast ==
- Ugo Tognazzi as Livio Stefani
- Monica Vitti as Lisa Stefani, Livio's wife
- Barbara Bouchet as Patty, Livio's secretary and lover
- John Richardson as Jean-Claude, Lisa's lover
- Antonio Allocca as Carmine
- Sabina De Guida as Cecilia
- Tom Felleghy as Livio's colleague
