= Enrico Maria Salerno =

Italian actor (1926–1994)

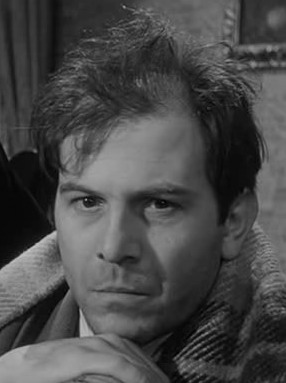
- Salerno in the movie Long Night in 1943 (1960)
- Born: 18 September 1926; Milan, Italy
- Died: 28 February 1994 (aged 67); Rome, Italy
- Occupations: Actor; voice actor; director; television presenter
- Years active: 1946–1994
- Height: 1.74 m (5 ft 9 in)
- Children: 5, including Chiara Salerno
- Relatives: Vittorio Salerno (brother)

Enrico Maria Salerno (18 September 1926 – 28 February 1994) was an Italian actor, voice actor and film director. He was also the voice of Clint Eastwood in the Italian version of Sergio Leone's Dollars Trilogy films, and the voice of Christ in The Gospel According to St. Matthew directed by Pier Paolo Pasolini.

== Biography ==
Enrico Maria Salerno was born in Milan on 18 September 1926, son of Antonino Salerno, an Italian lawyer originally from Erice (in province of Trapani, Sicily) and Milka Storff, a Yugoslav violinist. At only 17, he joined the Italian Social Republic as an officer cadet of the National Republican Guard. With the fall of the Italian Social Republic is imprisoned in the concentration camp of Coltano, near Pisa.

Actually the real name of the actor was Enrico. It was during the first theatrical experiences that he decided to place the name of Mary alongside his name, probably as an affectionate tribute to his mother Milka (corresponding to the Italian Maria). Among the most representative figures of the Italian show in the second half of the twentieth century, in his acting career he plays 102 theatrical performances, he shoots 92 films as performer, 3 as director, countless tv-movies, hundreds of hours of TV broadcasts, hundreds of hours of Radio.

After a small collaboration with Piccolo Teatro di Milano, from 1954 to 1955 (and more years) he worked in Teatro Stabile in Genoa, with Fyodor Dostoevsky, Pirandello, William Shakespeare, Vittorio Alfieri and Giraudoux successful stage adaptations.

In 1960, with Ivo Garrani and Giancarlo Sbragia, he founded the stage company "Nuova Compagnia degli Associati". In 1963 he starred in Who's Afraid of Virginia Woolf? by Edward Albee, co-starring Sarah Ferrati, stage direction by Franco Zeffirelli. In 1966 he was the star of Byron's Manfred, in the role of an actor reciting the musical score by Schumann, conducted by Claudio Abbado, directed by Mauro Bolognini.

In 1970 he made his direction film debut with the love drama box office and award-winning film The Anonymous Venetian. He was directed by many great film directors, as Mario Monicelli, Roberto Rossellini, Valerio Zurlini, Florestano Vancini, Dino Risi, Dario Argento, Luigi Comencini, Luigi Magni, Antonio Pietrangeli.

In 1991 he acted as the father of Six Characters in Search of an Author by Pirandello, directed by Franco Zeffirelli.

=== Personal life ===
He had four children, Giovanbattista, Edoardo, Pietruccio and Nicola, with his first wife Fioretta Pierella. He then married Laura Andreini. He had a long relationship with Valeria Valeri, with whom he had a daughter, Chiara Salerno, also a dubbing actress. He was a former boyfriend of actress and Silvio Berlusconi's ex-wife Veronica Lario. He was also romantically involved with Alice Kessler.

He had three brothers: Giovanbattista (artist & art professor), Fernando (music composer) and Vittorio (film director).

== Death ==
Salerno died in Rome of lung cancer on 28 February 1994 at the age of 67. After his death, an award in support of contemporary drama was dedicated to his memory.

== Selected filmography as actor ==
- Unknown Man of San Marino (1946) – MP Wolf (uncredited)
- Girls Marked Danger (La Tratta delle bianche) (1953, directed by Luigi Comencini) – Giorgio (uncredited)
- Human Torpedoes (1954) – Virgilio
- Violent Summer (Estate violenta) (1959, directed by Valerio Zurlini) – Ettore Caremoli – il padre di Carlo
- Siege of Syracuse (L'assedio di Siracusa) (1960, directed by Pietro Francisci) – Gorgia
- The Angel Wore Red (1960, directed by Nunnally Johnson) – Capt. Botargus
- Le signore (1960) – Renato, the make-up artist
- Escape by Night (Era notte a Roma) (1960, directed by Roberto Rossellini) – Doctor Costanzi
- The Warrior Empress (1960) – Melanchro
- Long Night in 1943 (La lunga notte del '43) (1960, directed by Nanni Loy) – Pino Barilari
- The Ladykiller of Rome (L'Assassino) (1961, directed by Elio Petri) – (uncredited)
- Nude Odyssey (1961) – Enrico
- Hercules and the Conquest of Atlantis (Ercole alla conquista di Atlantide) (1961, directed by Vittorio Cottafavi) – Re di Megara
- Violent Life (1961) – Bernardini – the trade-union representative (uncredited)
- La bellezza di Ippolita (1962) – Luca
- Smog (1962, directed by Franco Rossi) – Vittorio Ciocchetti
- Eva (1962) – (uncredited)
- Le Masque de fer (1962) – Mazarin
- Of Wayward Love (1962) – L'uomo (segment "Le donne")
- Violenza segreta (1963) – Contardi
- Il Fornaretto di Venezia (1963) – Lorenzo Barbo
- Urlo contro melodia nel Cantagiro '63 (1963)
- I maniaci (1964) – Castelli, the Successful Novelist (segment "la parolaccia")
- Queste pazze pazze donne (1964) – Onorevole Casali Bardi
- Backfire (1964) – Mario
- Three Nights of Love (1964) – Giuliano (segment "La moglie bambina")
- La costanza della ragione (1964) – Milloschi
- La fuga (1965) – Lo psicanalista
- Six Days a Week (1965) – Count Adriano Silveri
- Up and Down (1965) – Enrico (segment "Questione di Principo")
- Casanova 70 (1965, directed by Mario Monicelli) – Lo psicanalista
- I soldi (1965)
- Io la conoscevo bene (1965, directed by Antonio Pietrangeli) – Roberto
- L'ombrellone (1965, directed by Dino Risi) – Ingegner Enrico Marletti
- Lo scippo (1965) – rag. Linzalone
- Seven Golden Men Strike Again (1966) – Il Generale Presidente
- Seasons of Our Love (1966) – Vittorio Borghi
- For Love and Gold (1966, directed by Mario Monicelli) – Zenone
- L'estate (1966) – Sergio Boldrini
- Sex Quartet (1966) – Gianni (segment "Fata Sabina")
- 3 pistole contro Cesare (1967) – Julius Cesar Fuller
- The Oldest Profession (1967) – Rak (segment "Ère préhistorique, L'")
- The Strange Night (1967) – Carlo
- Bandidos (1967) – Richard Martin
- Death Sentence (1968) – Montero
- Train for Durango (1968) – Lucas
- Candy (1968, directed by Christian Marquand) – Jonathan J. John
- The Battle of El Alamein (La battaglia di El Alamein) (1969, directed by Giorgio Ferroni) – Sgt. Maj. Claudio Borri
- I See Naked (Vedo nudo) (1969) – Carlo Alberto Rinaldo
- The Bird with the Crystal Plumage (L'uccello dalle piume di cristallo) (1970, directed by Dario Argento) – Inspector Morosini
- Contestazione generale (1970) – Don Roberto
- Quell'amore particolare (1970) – Manlio Santi
- So Long Gulliver (1970) – Boss
- The Swinging Confessors (1970) – Don Calogero
- Noi donne siamo fatte così (1971) – Professor Ivano Borghi (segment "Romantica")
- A cuore freddo (1971) – Enrico Salvari
- The Sicilian Checkmate (1972) – Prosecutor
- Execution Squad (1972) – Commissario Bertone
- The Assassination of Trotsky (1972, directed by Joseph Losey) – Salazar
- Hospitals: The White Mafia (1973, directed by Luigi Zampa) – Dr. Giordani
- No, the Case Is Happily Resolved (1973) – Giuseppe Ferdinando Giannoli – 'Don Peppino'
- The African Deal (1973) – Franco Donati
- The Police Serve the Citizens? (1973) – Nicola Sironi
- La polizia sta a guardare (1973) – Cardone
- La notte dell'ultimo giorno (1973) – Giorgio Bardelli
- Ingrid sulla strada (1973) – Urbano
- The Body (1974) – Antoine
- Hold-Up, instantánea de una corrupción (1974) – Mark Gavin
- City Under Siege (1974) – Inspector Michele Parrino
- Verginità (1974) – Salvatore Cascemi (Segment 2)
- Salvo D'Acquisto (1974) – Rubino
- Gambling City (1975) – The 'President'
- Night Train Murders (L'ultimo treno della notte) (1975, directed by Aldo Lado) – Dr. Giulio Stradi
- ...a tutte le auto della polizia (1975) – Police Chief Carraro
- The Left Hand of the Law (1975) – Minister
- Savage Three (1975) – Commissario Santagà
- Un prete scomodo (1975) – Don Lorenzo Milani
- A Sold Life (1976) – Luigi Ventura
- Bestialità (1976) – Ugo
- Diary of a Passion (1976) – Giacomo
- Che notte quella notte! (1977) – Saverio
- Una donna di seconda mano (1977) – Augusto
- Amori miei (1978) – Antonio Bianchi
- Gros-Câlin (1979) – Le président
- Tesoro mio (1979) – Avv. Roberto Manetta
- Il corpo della ragassa (1979) – Professor Ulderico Quario
- L'ultima volta insieme (1981) – Luigi Antonelli
- Il carabiniere (1981) – De Michelis
- An Ideal Adventure (1982) – Eugenio Zafferi
- Legati da tenera amicizia (1983) – Adalberto Maria Gioia
- Scuola di ladri (1986) – Alibrando Siraghi
- Scuola di ladri – Parte seconda (1987) – Aliprando Siraghi
- Il volpone (1988) – Ciro Corvino

== Filmography as film director ==
- The Anonymous Venetian (Anonimo veneziano) (1970)
- Cari genitori (1973)
- Eutanasia di un amore (1978)
- Disperatamente Giulia TV miniseries (1989)
- Il barone TV miniseries (1995)
