= Raimondo Crociani =

Italian film editor (1946–2023)

- Born: 14 January 1946; Rome, Italy
- Died: 14 June 2023 (aged 77); Santa Margherita di Belice, Italy
- Occupations: Film editor; director

Raimondo Crociani (14 January 1946 – 14 June 2023) was an Italian film editor and occasional director.

Raised in a family of film editors, he started working between the late 1960s and early 1970s in numerous political documentaries produced by Unitelefilm, a film company linked to the Italian Communist Party.

During his career, Crociani worked as editor on more than 100 productions between 1971 and 2012, including works by Ettore Scola, Valerio Zurlini, Franco Giraldi, Alberto Bevilacqua, Steno, Alberto Sordi, and Roberto Faenza. He won a David di Donatello for Best Editing in 1985, for Ettore Scola's Ballando Ballando.

Crociani died on 14 June 2023, at the age of 77.

== Selected filmography ==
- L'uccello migratore (1972)
- The Most Wonderful Evening of My Life (1972)
- Gli ordini sono ordini (1972)
- Trevico-Turin: Voyage in Fiatnam (1973)
- My Brother Anastasia (1973)
- Sgarro alla camorra (1973)
- Polvere di stelle (1973)
- We All Loved Each Other So Much (1974)
- Policewoman (1974)
- La liceale (1975)
- The Suspicious Death of a Minor (1975)
- The Desert of the Tartars (1976)
- Colpita da improvviso benessere (1976)
- Febbre da cavallo (1976)
- Taxi Girl (1977)
- A Special Day (1977)
- Amori miei (1978)
- Hot Potato (1979)
- Le rose di Danzica (1979)
- A Policewoman on the Porno Squad (1979)
- Dr. Jekyll Likes Them Hot (1979)
- La terrazza (1980)
- Quando la coppia scoppia (1981)
- I fichissimi (1981)
- Passion of Love (1981)
- Prickly Pears (1981)
- Il tango della gelosia (1981)
- An Ideal Adventure (1982)
- That Night in Varennes (1982)
- Banana Joe (1982)
- Eccezzziunale... veramente (1982)
- I'm Going to Live by Myself (1982)
- Bonnie and Clyde Italian Style (1983)
- Time for Loving (1983)
- Dagger Eyes (1983)
- Le Bal (1983)
- Vacanze di Natale (1983)
- Mani di fata (1983)
- Vacanze in America (1984)
- Chewingum (1984)
- Amarsi un po' (1984)
- Blues metropolitano (1985)
- Love at First Sight (1985)
- Nothing Underneath (1985)
- Il ragazzo del Pony Express (1986)
- Da grande (1987)
- Bellifreschi (1987)
- Una botta di vita (1988)
- Bye Bye Baby (1988)
- What Time Is It? (1989)
- Captain Fracassa's Journey (1990)
- Vacanze di Natale '90 (1990)
- Vacanze di Natale '91 (1991)
- Acla's Descent into Floristella (1992)
- Ricky & Barabba (1992)
- Anni 90 (1992)
- Anni 90: Parte II (1993)
- Mario, Maria and Mario (1993)
- Miracolo italiano (1994)
- Men Men Men (1995)
- The Story of a Poor Young Man (1995)
- The Dinner (1998)
- Unfair Competition (2001)
- People of Rome (2003)
- Three Steps Over Heaven (2004)
- 13 at a Table (2004)
- Olé (2006)
- 2061: An Exceptional Year (2007)
- La vita è una cosa meravigliosa (2010)
- Ti presento un amico (2010)
- Ex 2: Still Friends? (2011)
- The Last Fashion Show (2011)
- Buona giornata (2012)
