= Help Me, My Love =

1969 film by Alberto Sordi

- Theatrical release poster
- Italian: Amore mio aiutami
- Directed by: Alberto Sordi
- Written by: Rodolfo Sonego; Alberto Sordi; Tullio Pinelli
- Produced by: Gianni Hecht Lucari
- Starring: Alberto Sordi; Monica Vitti
- Cinematography: Carlo Di Palma
- Edited by: Franco Fraticelli
- Music by: Piero Piccioni
- Production company: Documento Film
- Distributed by: Columbia C.E.I.A.D.
- Release date: 3 October 1969
- Running time: 122 minutes
- Country: Italy
- Language: Italian

Help Me, My Love (Italian: Amore mio aiutami) is a 1969 commedia all'italiana film co-written and directed by Alberto Sordi, who stars alongside Monica Vitti. The film follows a happily married couple whose relationship is thrown into turmoil when the wife falls in love with another man.

== Plot ==
Giovanni and Raffaella Macchiavelli are a happily married couple living in Rome. One morning, they read a newspaper story about a man who shot his wife dead for taking a walk with her supposed lover. Discussing the crime on the drive to the nearly completed beach house that Giovanni has had built for Raffaella, he declares himself a modern man who would allow his wife to have an affair as long as they discussed everything openly, while she believes that marriage should never be discussed between partners.

At the beach house, Giovanni is distraught when Raffaella reveals that she fallen in love with another man, though she insists that he is unaware of her feelings. After Giovanni overcomes the initial shock, Raffaella tells him that the man, Valerio Mantovani, is a nuclear physicist and professor whom she met at the chamber music concerts she has been attending every Wednesday with her mother Elena, who was the one who introduced Valerio to Raffaella. Back at home, Giovanni struggles to deal with Raffaella's growing infatuation with Valerio.

At the next concert Raffaella attends with her mother, Giovanni secretly spies on his wife sitting beside Valerio in the audience. When Raffaella returns home, she suggests a meeting between Giovanni and Valerio. Giovanni angrily rejects the idea and demands that Raffaella never see Valerio again, but when she pleads with Giovanni to help her overcome her infatuation, he consoles her.

After spying on Raffaella attending a concert alone with Valerio, Giovanni visits Valerio's house and tells him he is aware of his meetings with Raffaella. Valerio says that he and Raffaella are just friends, but when Giovanni reveals that Raffaella has fallen in love with him, Valerio pledges to stop meeting her. As Giovanni leaves, a young, attractive female student arrives at Valerio's house for a private lesson.

While attending a concert alone, Raffaella is heartbroken over Valerio's absence and passes out. During a car ride on the highway, Raffaella is furious to learn that Giovanni visited Valerio. Giovanni also tries to convince Raffaella that Valerio is having an affair with the young female student who came to his house. Enraged, Raffaella proclaims that she loves Valerio, prompting Giovanni to brutally beat her on a nearby beach. Some time later, Raffaella is miraculously cured of her infatuation with Valerio, but she becomes depressed when he calls her saying he has been promoted and is leaving Italy.

At a mutual friend's suggestion, Giovanni takes Raffaella on a cruise to Spain. However, Giovanni confronts her after seeing her talking to Valerio on the cruise. Raffaella admits she was devastated that Valerio is moving away, and that she did not tell Giovanni the truth for fear that he would beat her again. Giovanni invites Valerio to dinner with them, but when Valerio dances with another woman, Giovanni finds Raffaella in tears. At Giovanni's request, Valerio shares a slow dance with Raffaella. Giovanni later finds Raffaella and Valerio having sex in a cabin.

The next morning, Giovanni attempts suicide by overdosing on pills. When Raffaella returns to their cabin shortly afterwards, Giovanni is rushed to a doctor who saves him in time. Raffaella informs Giovanni that she is leaving him to be with Valerio in Spain. Later, Giovanni visits Raffaella's hotel suite in Seville, where they share a tearful goodbye. When Raffaella asks Giovanni if he wants her to come back with him, he shakes his head and leaves.

== Cast ==
- Alberto Sordi as Giovanni Machiavelli
- Monica Vitti as Raffaella Machiavelli
- Silvano Tranquilli as Valerio Mantovani
- Laura Adani as Elena
- Ugo Gregoretti as Michele Parodi
- Mariolina Cannuli as Danila Parodi
- Néstor Garay as Father Bardella
- Karl-Otto Alberty as Bauer

== Reception ==
Sordi and Vitti were the previous season's biggest box office stars in Italy and the film was the number one film in Rome in its opening weekend, grossing $18,500.
