= The Scarlet Lady (1969 film) =

1969 film by Jean Valère

- French theatrical release poster
- French: La Femme écarlate
- Directed by: Jean Valère
- Screenplay by: Jean Valère
- Adaptation by: Paul Gégauff; Jean Valère
- Dialogue by: Paul Gégauff
- Produced by: André Génovès
- Starring: Monica Vitti; Maurice Ronet; Robert Hossein; Claudio Brook; Simono; Gérard Lartigau
- Cinematography: Carlo Di Palma
- Edited by: Jacques Gaillard
- Music by: Michel Colombier
- Production companies: Les Films de la Boétie; Les Films de l'Epée; PEA
- Distributed by: CFDC; UGC; Les Films Sirius; Consortium Pathé (France); PEA (Italy)
- Release dates: 14 May 1969 (France); 29 August 1969 (Italy)
- Running time: 87 minutes
- Countries: France; Italy
- Language: French

The Scarlet Lady (French: La Femme écarlate; Italian: La donna scarlatta), also known as The Bitch Wants Blood, is a 1969 comedy-drama film directed by Jean Valère and starring Monica Vitti, Maurice Ronet and Robert Hossein. Written by Valère and Paul Gégauff, the film follows a beautiful Italian businesswoman who, after being swindled out of her fortune by her boyfriend, travels to Paris to kill him before killing herself.

== Plot ==
Lucille Lombardi, a beautiful young Italian heiress to a perfume business, discovers that her boyfriend and marketing manager, Julien Auchard, has bankrupted her family business, cheated her out of her wealth, and left her penniless. Devastated by the betrayal and the loss of her villa in Nice, and feeling hopeless, Lucille flies to Paris, sells her jewelry and binges on champagne and caviar while contemplating suicide. At first, she plans to leave Julien a note blaming him for her suicide, but realizing it would have little effect on him, she instead opts for revenge and decides that she must kill Julien before ending her own life. Knowing that Julien travels to Paris every Friday, Lucille holds off on suicide for one week until she has a chance to kill the man who ruined her life.

While in Paris, Lucille buys a used Austin Princess luxury car, steals a gun from a gun shop and sets about planning her revenge while continuing her lavish spending on designer clothes and expensive food. Uncomfortable being alone, she invites a stranger named François, a marine salvage expert, to have a romantic lunch with her at the Eiffel Tower. When Lucille reveals her intentions to end her life later that week, François shows genuine concern for her and vows not to leave her side. Lucille eludes him after lunch and he is unable to follow. In the coming days, François desperately tries to locate her as she continues her spending spree while waiting for Julien to arrive in Paris.

While posing as a Swiss journalist, Lucille becomes entangled with a New York News correspondent named John Bert, a shady Argentine man named Alberto de Villalonga, and Tom Sturges, the drug-addled manager of the English rock band the Timothys. She goes on a series of dates, continuing her extravagant spending during her final days. Meanwhile, François continues his desperate search for the woman he believes will kill herself on Friday. After receiving no help from the police, he tracks down all the Austin Princess owners in Paris, hoping it will lead him to Lucille. Despairing on not finding her, François resigns himself to his work, which involves a lucrative new salvage operation in Venezuela that will make him wealthy (from the shady Argentine Alberto as it turns out).

On Thursday night, Lucille wanders the streets of Paris alone. A man approaches her, mistaking her for a prostitute, and she goes back to his place to have sex, later giving away the 300 francs she was paid. On Friday, Lucille meets Julien at Orly Airport and lies that she has a wealthy investor who can buy back the company that Julien now owns. Interested in the deal, Julien accompanies her to her hotel room where she pulls her gun, demanding that she accompany him to his appointment in Chantilly. Intending to kill them both in an auto accident, Lucille has second thoughts just as they are about to crash into a transmission tower. "You disgust me so much that it will save your life", she tells Julien as she leaves him at the roadside and drives away.

Back in Paris, François spots Lucille's Austin Princess by chance and follows her to the Eiffel Tower, where she intends to end her life. At the top, Lucille considers jumping, but something prevents her. When François arrives at the top, he finds her eating dessert in the restaurant where they enjoyed their romantic lunch, and they smile at each other.

== Cast ==
- Monica Vitti as Lucille Lombardi (Note: In the film, Vitti's character is addressed only as Madame Lombardi. In one scene, she tells a hotel clerk that her name is Lucille Lagrange, an assumed name. Some sources have identified her character variously as Lucie and Eva, neither of which is supported by the film.)
- Maurice Ronet as François
- Robert Hossein as Julien Auchard
- Claudio Brook as John Bert
- Albert Simono (credited as Simono) as Alberto de Villalonga
- Lucien Raimbourg
- Monique Mélinand as the medium
- Jacques Ciron as the car seller
- Simone Bach
- Robert Rollis as the taxi driver
- Sabine Sun
- Colette Gérard
- Antonio Passalia
- Stéphane
- François de Lannurien
- Fredy Meyer
- Gérard Lartigau as Tommy Sturges
- Claude Chabrol as an Eiffel Tower lift operator (uncredited)

== Production ==
Principal photography took place from 18 November to 31 December 1968.

=== Filming locations ===
- Eiffel Tower, Paris, France
- Paris, France
- Paris-Orly Airport, Paris, France
- Nice, France
- Nice Côte d'Azur Airport, Nice, France

=== Soundtrack ===
The music for The Scarlet Lady was composed by Michel Colombier. A soundtrack EP was released in 1969 on the Barclay label (Barclay 71 351).

Track listing

1. "Just Keep On Walking" (Marnay, Jackson, Colombier) – 3:46
2. "Wonderful, Wonderful" (Marnay, Jackson, Colombier), performed by Fredy Meyer – 1:41
3. "Dream" (Colombier) – 4:30
