= Amori miei =

1978 film

- Directed by: Steno
- Written by: Iaia Fiastri
- Starring: Monica Vitti
- Cinematography: Franco Di Giacomo
- Edited by: Raimondo Crociani
- Music by: Armando Trovajoli
- Distributed by: Cineriz
- Release date: 1978
- Language: Italian

Amori miei (internationally released as My Loves) is a 1978 Italian comedy film directed by Steno. For this film Monica Vitti was awarded with a David di Donatello for Best Actress.

== Cast ==
- Monica Vitti: Anna Lisa Bianchi
- Johnny Dorelli: Marco Rossi
- Enrico Maria Salerno: Antonio Bianchi
- Edwige Fenech: Deborah
- Pietro Zardini: taxi driver
- Maria Tedeschi: old woman crossing the street

== Reception ==
The film was the most popular Italian film of the 1978-79 season.
