= Il tango della gelosia =

- Italian theatrical release poster by Renato Casaro
- Directed by: Steno
- Written by: Steno; Enrico Vanzina; Carlo Vanzina
- Starring: Monica Vitti
- Cinematography: Giorgio Di Battista
- Edited by: Raimondo Crociani
- Music by: Gianni Mazza
- Release date: 1981
- Running time: 100 minutes
- Language: Italian

Il tango della gelosia (Tango of Jealousy) is a 1981 Italian comedy film directed by Steno. It is based on a play by Aldo De Benedetti.

== Plot ==
Since her husband is distracted by his passion for horse racing, Lucia decides to make him jealous by pretending to be the lover of his bodyguard, Diego.

== Cast ==
- Monica Vitti: Lucia
- Diego Abatantuono: Diego
- Philippe Leroy: Prince Giulio Lovanelli
- Tito LeDuc: Paul
- Jenny Tamburi: Nunzia
