= Policewoman (film) =

1974 film by Steno

- Italian theatrical release poster
- Directed by: Steno
- Written by: Luciano Vincenzoni; Sergio Donati; Nicola Badalucco
- Produced by: Carlo Ponti
- Starring: Mariangela Melato; Renato Pozzetto
- Cinematography: Alberto Spagnoli
- Edited by: Raimondo Crociani
- Music by: Gianni Ferrio
- Distributed by: Titanus
- Release date: 1974
- Running time: 100 min
- Country: Italy
- Language: Italian

La poliziotta (internationally released as Policewoman) is a 1974 Italian comedy film directed by Steno. For this film Mariangela Melato was awarded with a David di Donatello for Best Actress.

== Plot ==
In Milan, the young policewoman Gianna discovers an ecological scandal involving an honorable local deputy, and has to face the hypocrisy and the corruption which plague the police and the society of the time.

== Cast ==
- Mariangela Melato as Giovanna 'Gianna' Abbastanzi
- Orazio Orlando as Magistrate Ruggero Patanè
- Mario Carotenuto as Police Chief Marcellini
- Renato Pozzetto as Claudio Ravassi
- Alberto Lionello as Tarcisio Monti
- Armando Brancia as Senator Giuseppe Brembani
- Renato Scarpa as Pharmacist Camillotti
- Gianfranco Barra as Dr. Gargiulo
- Umberto Smaila as Son of the Mayor
- Alvaro Vitali as Fantuzzi
- Pia Velsi as Giovanna's mother

== See also ==
- List of Italian films of 1974
