= Ninì Tirabusciò: la donna che inventò la mossa =

1970 film

- Film poster
- Directed by: Marcello Fondato
- Written by: Marcello Fondato
- Produced by: Silvio Clementelli
- Starring: Monica Vitti
- Cinematography: Carlo Di Palma
- Edited by: Sergio Montanari
- Music by: Carlo Rustichelli
- Release date: 21 December 1970
- Running time: 121 minutes
- Country: Italy
- Language: Italian

Ninì Tirabusciò: la donna che inventò la mossa (Ninì Tirabusciò: the woman who invented "the move") is a 1970 Italian comedy film directed by Marcello Fondato. It was entered into the 21st Berlin International Film Festival.

== Cast ==
- Monica Vitti as Maria Sarti aka Ninì Tirabusciò
- Gastone Moschin as Mariotti - Police deputy
- Carlo Giuffrè as Antonio, the musician
- Claude Rich as Paolo di Sergeno
- Sylva Koscina as The Baroness of Valdarno
- Peppino De Filippo as Giudge
- Ennio Balbo as General
- Salvo Randone as Baby Marini
- Nino Taranto as Ciccio, the illusionist
- Lino Banfi as Nicola Maldacea
- Pierre Clémenti as Francesco, the futurist poet
- Angela Luce as the Singer
