= Seasons of Our Love =

- Directed by: Florestano Vancini
- Written by: Elio Bartolini; Florestano Vancini
- Starring: Enrico Maria Salerno; Anouk Aimée; Jacqueline Sassard
- Cinematography: Dario Di Palma
- Edited by: Nino Baragli
- Music by: Carlo Rustichelli
- Release date: 25 March 1966
- Running time: 93 minutes
- Country: Italy
- Language: Italian

Seasons of Our Love (Italian: Le stagioni del nostro amore) is a 1966 Italian drama film directed by Florestano Vancini. It was entered into the 16th Berlin International Film Festival.

== Cast ==
- Enrico Maria Salerno as Vittorio Borghi
- Anouk Aimée as Francesca
- Jacqueline Sassard as Elena
- Gastone Moschin as Tancredi
- Valeria Valeri as Milena Borghi, Vittorio's wife
- Gian Maria Volonté as Leonardo Varzi

- Massimo Giuliani as Leonardo Varzi as a kid

- Checco Rissone as Olindo Civenini
- Daniele Vargas as the Count
- Pietro Tordi as Mario Borghi
- Luciano Damiani
