= Mimì Bluette... fiore del mio giardino =

Novel by Guido da Verona

Mimì Bluette... fiore del mio giardino (Mimì Bluette... flower of my garden) is a novel written by Guido da Verona in 1916. It was a huge commercial success, selling 300,000 copies as of 1922, an impressive run in Italy where illiteracy characterized the majority of the population.

A film based on the novel directed by Carlo Di Palma and starring Monica Vitti was released in 1976.
