= That's How We Women Are =

- Directed by: Dino Risi
- Cinematography: Carlo Di Palma
- Edited by: Alberto Gallitti
- Music by: Armando Trovajoli
- Release date: 1971
- Country: Italy
- Language: Italian

Noi donne siamo fatte così (internationally released as That's How We Women Are) is a 1971 Italian anthology comedy film directed by Dino Risi. The film consists of twelve segments, all starring Monica Vitti.

== Cast ==
- Monica Vitti: la suonatrice di piatti, Zoe, Annunziata, Teresa, Alberta, Eliana, Katherine, Erika, Palmira, Agata, Laura, Fulvia
- Carlo Giuffrè: Ferdinando, marito di Alberta
- Enrico Maria Salerno: Ivano, compagno di viaggio di Zoe
- Ettore Manni: suonatore, compagno di Teresa
- Greta Vayan
- Renzo Marignano
- Clara Colosimo
