= Three Fables of Love =

1962 film

- Film poster
- Directed by: Alessandro Blasetti; Hervé Bromberger; René Clair; Luis García Berlanga
- Written by: Hervé Bromberger; Frédéric Grendel
- Produced by: Gilbert de Goldschmidt
- Starring: Leslie Caron; Anna Karina; Monica Vitti
- Music by: Charles Aznavour; Georges Garvarentz
- Release date: 21 December 1962
- Running time: 110 minutes
- Countries: France; Italy; Spain
- Languages: French; Spanish

Three Fables of Love (French: Les Quatre Vérités, Italian: Le quattro verità, Spanish: Las cuatro verdades) is a 1962 internationally co-produced comedy film starring Leslie Caron, Anna Karina and Monica Vitti. It was shown as part of a retrospective on Italian comedy at the 67th Venice International Film Festival.

== Cast ==
- Manuel Alexandre
- Ángel Álvarez
- Charles Aznavour as Charles (segment "Les deux pigeons")
- Alessandro Blasetti
- Xan das Bolas
- Alain Bouvette as Un collègue de Charles
- Rossano Brazzi as Leo
- Raymond Bussières as Le voleur (segment "Les deux pigeons")
- Leslie Caron as Annie (segment "Les deux pigeons")
- Ana Casares
- Hubert Deschamps as L'avocat
- Lola Gaos
- Anna Karina as Colombe
- Sylva Koscina as Mia
- Hardy Krüger
- Albert Michel as Un collègue de Charles
- Mario Passante as Le restaurateur
- Jean Poiret as Renard (segment "Le corbeau et le renard")
- Michel Serrault as Corbeau
- Gianrico Tedeschi as Valerio
- Monica Vitti as Madeleine
