= Le bambole =

1965 anthology film

- Theatrical release poster
- Directed by: Mauro Bolognini; Luigi Comencini; Dino Risi; Franco Rossi
- Screenplay by: Rodolfo Sonego; Luciano Salce Steno; Leo Benvenuti; Piero De Bernardi
- Story by: Rodolfo Sonego; Luciano Salce Steno; Luigi Magni; Leo Benvenuti; Piero De Bernardi
- Based on: The Decameron by Giovanni Boccaccio
- Produced by: Gianni Hecht Lucari
- Starring: Gina Lollobrigida; Nino Manfredi; Elke Sommer; Jean Sorel; Monica Vitti; Virna Lisi; Akim Tamiroff
- Cinematography: Leonida Barboni; Roberto Gerardi; Ennio Guarnieri; Mario Montuori
- Edited by: Roberto Cinquini; Giorgio Serrallonga
- Music by: Armando Trovajoli
- Distributed by: CEIAD (Italy); Columbia Pictures (France)
- Release dates: 26 January 1965 (Italy); 7 July 1965 (France)
- Running time: 109 minutes
- Countries: Italy; France
- Language: Italian

Le bambole (US title: The Dolls; UK title: Four Kinds of Love) is a 1965 comedy anthology film in four segments, starring Gina Lollobrigida, Nino Manfredi, Elke Sommer, Jean Sorel, Monica Vitti, Virna Lisi and Akim Tamiroff.

The four vignettes—"The Telephone Call" ("La telefonata"), "Treatise on Eugenics" ("Il trattato di eugenetica"), "The Soup" ("La minestra"), and "Monsignor Cupid" ("Monsignor Cupido")—concern secrets of love and secret lovers. The fourth segment is based on a tale of Boccaccio's The Decameron.

== Cast ==
- Nino Manfredi as Giorgio (segment "La telefornata")
- Virna Lisi as Luisa (segment "La telefornata")
- Elke Sommer as Ulla (segment "Il trattato di eugenetica")
- Maurizio Arena as Massimo (segment "Il trattato di eugenetica)
- Piero Focaccia as Valerio (segment "Il trattato di eugenetica)
- Monica Vitti as Giovanna (segment "La minestra")
- Gina Lollobrigida as Beatrice (segment "Monsignor Cupido")
- Jean Sorel as Vincenzo (segment "Monsignor Cupido")
- Akim Tamiroff as Monsignor Arcudi (segment "Monsignor Cupido")
