= Camera d'albergo =

- Directed by: Mario Monicelli
- Written by: Age & Scarpelli; Mario Monicelli
- Cinematography: Tonino Delli Colli
- Edited by: Ruggero Mastroianni
- Music by: Detto Mariano
- Release date: 1981
- Running time: 105 minutes
- Country: Italy
- Language: Italian

Camera d'albergo is a 1981 Italian comedy film written and directed by Mario Monicelli. Ida Di Benedetto won the David di Donatello for Best Supporting Actress and Ruggero Mastroianni won the David di Donatello for Best Editing.

== Cast ==
- Vittorio Gassman: Achille Mengaroni
- Monica Vitti: Flaminia
- Enrico Montesano: Fausto Talponi
- Roger Pierre: Cesare De Blasi
- Béatrice Bruno: Emma
- Ida Di Benedetto: Moglie vergine
- Néstor Garay: Cesare Di Blasi
- Gianni Agus: Se stesso
- Franco Ferrini: Gianni
- Daniele Formica: Aldo
- Nando Paone: Guido Bollati
- Paul Muller: Hans
- Isa Danieli: Maria
