= Adriana Lecouvreur (film) =

1955 film directed by Guido Salvini

- Directed by: Guido Salvini
- Written by: Emily Bundrum; Ernest Legouvé (play); Eugène Scribe (play)
- Cinematography: Leonida Barboni
- Music by: Renzo Rossellini
- Distributed by: Variety Distribution
- Release date: 1955
- Country: Italy
- Language: Italian

Adriana Lecouvreur is a 1955 Italian biographical film about 18th-century actress Adrienne Lecouvreur. It stars actor Gabriele Ferzetti.

== Cast ==
- Valentina Cortese: Adriana Lecouvreur
- Gabriele Ferzetti: Maurizio di Sassonia
- Olga Villi: Principessa di Bouillon
- Annibale Ninchi: Principe di Bouillon
- Memo Benassi: Michonnet
- Leonardo Cortese: Conte di Chazeul
- Valeria Valeri: La Duclos
- Monica Vitti
- Carlo Tamberlani
- Renato Malavasi
- Silvano Tranquilli
- Luciana Paluzzi
- Pietro Tordi
