= Money (1991 film) =

1991 Canadian-French drama film

- French theatrical release poster
- Directed by: Steven Hilliard Stern
- Written by: Paul-Loup Sulitzer (novel); Larry Pederson; Gordon Roback
- Produced by: André Djaoui; René Malo
- Starring: Eric Stoltz; Christopher Plummer; Maryam d'Abo
- Cinematography: Franco Di Giacomo
- Music by: Ennio Morricone
- Distributed by: United International Pictures
- Release date: 1991
- Running time: 105 minutes
- Countries: Canada, France
- Language: English

Money is a 1991 Canadian-French drama film directed by Steven Hilliard Stern.

The film centers around a young rich man's revenge on his late father's associates who have stolen his inheritance money.

== Plot ==
Frank Cimballi (Eric Stoltz) is a rich 21-year-old who goes to claim his inheritance only to find it has been embezzled by his father's former business partners. Traveling the globe in search of the white-collar thieves who have robbed him of millions, Frank locates his father's seriously ill associate Will Scarlet (F. Murray Abraham), who admits to his role in the crime and agrees to help Frank track down the rest of the men on his revenge list.

== Cast ==
- Eric Stoltz as Frank Cimballi
- Maryam d'Abo as Sarah Wilkins
- Bruno Cremer as Marc Lavater
- Mario Adorf as The Turk
- Anna Kanakis as Anna Lupino
- F. Murray Abraham as Will Scarlett
- Christopher Plummer as Martin Yahl
- Bernard Fresson as Henry Landau
- Angelo Infanti as Romano
- Tomas Milian as Robert Zara
