= Dario Di Palma =

Italian cinematographer

Dario Di Palma (6 November 1932 - 24 October 2004) was an Italian film cinematographer.

Born in Rome, Di Palma began to work in the 1950s as camera operator and assistant camera operator, often with his uncle Carlo Di Palma as cinematographer. After taking care of the cinematography of the second unit for the peplum film Romulus and Remus (1961) by Sergio Corbucci, he began his career as cinematographer with two other peplum films, both directed by Alberto De Martino, Terrible Sheriff (1962) and Perseo l'invincibile (1963).

In mid-1960s, he started working in more significant films, such as Almost a Man by Vittorio De Seta and Seasons of Our Love by Florestano Vancini. Di Palma later reached the peak of his career in the 1970s, when he signed the cinematography of notable titles such as Lina Wertmüller's The Seduction of Mimi, Valerio Zurlini's Indian Summer and Ettore Scola's Ugly, Dirty and Bad.

The tragic suicide of his son, who had been his assistant on the set of the Scola's film, sank him into a depression and away from work. Later Di Palma never returned to major productions, working mainly for Italian television and prematurely ending his career at the beginning of the nineties.
