= Franco Di Giacomo =

Italian cinematographer

- Born: 18 September 1932; Amatrice, Kingdom of Italy
- Died: 30 April 2016 (aged 83); Acilia, Rome, Italy
- Occupation: Cinematographer

Franco Di Giacomo (18 September 1932 – 30 April 2016) was an Italian cinematographer.

== Life and career ==
Born in Amatrice, Province of Rieti, Di Giacomo started his career as assistant of Aldo Tonti. For many years he worked as an operator, notably collaborating to Joseph L. Mankiewicz's Cleopatra, Vittorio De Sica's Marriage Italian Style and Sergio Leone's The Good, the Bad and the Ugly and Once Upon a Time in the West.

Di Giacomo made his debut as a cinematographer in 1970, with Salvatore Samperi's Kill the Fatted Calf and Roast It. In 1983, he won the David di Donatello for Best Cinematography for Paolo and Vittorio Taviani's The Night of the Shooting Stars. He also worked, among others, with Nanni Moretti, Ettore Scola, Marco Bellocchio, Michael Radford, Bernardo Bertolucci, Dino Risi, Nikita Mikhalkov and Mario Monicelli.

In 2000, Di Giacomo received a Flaiano Prize for his career. In his late years, he was professor of cinematography at the ACT Multimedia Academy in Cinecittà. He died on 30 April 2016, at the age of 83.

== Selected filmography ==
- Kill the Fatted Calf and Roast It (1970)
- When Women Had Tails (1970)
- The Most Beautiful Wife (1970)
- Million Dollar Eel (1971)
- Four Flies on Grey Velvet (1971)
- Who Saw Her Die? (1972)
- La Tosca (1973)
- Polvere di stelle (1973)
- La sbandata (1974)
- Libera, My Love (1975)
- The Sex Machine (1975)
- Duck in Orange Sauce (1975)
- Plot of Fear (1976)
- Tell Me You Do Everything for Me (1976)
- Victory March (1976)
- The Bishop's Bedroom (1977)
- Hitch-Hike (1977)
- They Called Him Bulldozer (1978)
- Amori miei (1978)
- Sahara Cross (1978)
- The Sheriff and the Satellite Kid (1979)
- The Meadow (1979)
- Men or Not Men (1980)
- Everything Happens to Me (1980)
- The Day Christ Died (1980)
- Sweet Dreams (1981)
- Buddy Goes West (1981)
- Bonnie and Clyde Italian Style (1982)
- Amityville II: The Possession (1982)
- The Night of the Shooting Stars (1982)
- Fighting Back (1982)
- The World of Don Camillo (1983)
- Un povero ricco (1983)
- The Mass Is Ended (1985)
- Christopher Columbus (1985)
- Casablanca, Casablanca (1985)
- The Inquiry (1986)
- La Storia (1986)
- Dark Eyes (1987)
- A Boy from Calabria (1987)
- It's Happening Tomorrow (1988)
- Run for Your Life (1988)
- La bottega dell'orefice (1989)
- 'O Re - The King of Naples (1989)
- Rossini! Rossini! (1991)
- Money (1991)
- A Fine Romance (1991)
- Parenti serpenti (1992)
- The Storm Is Coming (1993)
- Il Postino: The Postman (1994)
- Foreign Student (1994)
- The Story of a Poor Young Man (1995)
- We Free Kings (1996)
- The Dinner (1998)
- Jet Set (2000)
- Resurrection (2001)
- Luisa Sanfelice (2004)
