= Nerina Montagnani =

Italian actress (1897–1993)

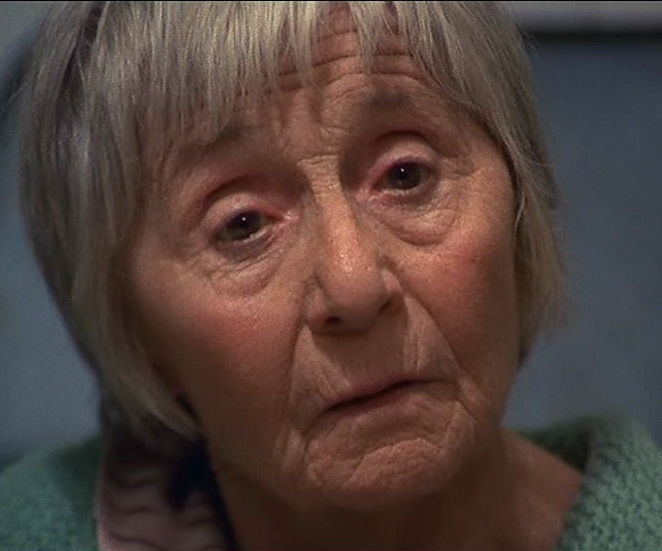
- Montagnani in 1972
- Born: 20 April 1897; Maranello, Modena, Kingdom of Italy
- Died: 4 November 1993 (aged 96); Maranello, Modena, Italy
- Occupation: Actress

Nerina Montagnani (pronounced [neˈriːna montaɲˈɲaːni]; 20 April 1897 – 4 November 1993) was an Italian actress.

== Life and career ==
Born in Maranello, Modena, Montagnani graduated as a teacher. Starting in 1918 she worked as a governess and a gardener in many noble houses in France and Italy. At 68 years old, while working at the Palazzo Barberini as a gardener, she was discovered by Federico Fellini who gave her supporting roles in Giulietta degli spiriti, Satyricon and The Clowns. From then, for about 25 years, Montagnani appeared in dozens of films and stage works. She obtained a large popularity with the role of Natalina, Nino Manfredi's chambermaid in a long series of Lavazza commercials shot between 1979 and 1990.

She died of bronchopneumonia at 96 years old.
