= Luigi Kuveiller =

Italian cinematographer

Luigi Kuveiller (3 October 1927 – 10 January 2013) was an Italian cinematographer, best known for his collaboration with film director Elio Petri.

Born in Rome, the son of an interior decorator, Kuveiller soon abandoned his studies and began working as an apprentice at Cinecittà in the troupe of cinematographer Filiberto Emmanuel for the propaganda film Redenzione (1943), directed by Marcello Albani. Becoming a camera assistant in 1945, Kuveiller started working as a camera operator in the 1950s, working among others for Aldo Scavarda on L'Avventura (1960) by Michelangelo Antonioni, and for Aldo Tonti on Barabbas (1961).

Kuveiller made his debut as a cinematographer with We Still Kill the Old Way (1967), a film which marked the beginning of his critically appreciated artistic collaboration with Elio Petri. His credits also include films by Billy Wilder, Marco Bellocchio, Mario Monicelli, Paul Morrissey, Marco Ferreri, Alberto Lattuada, Dario Argento, Lucio Fulci and Damiano Damiani. Kuveiller later devoted himself mainly to popular comedy, regularly working with Bruno Corbucci and Carlo Vanzina.

Starting in the mid-eighties, he began working for television, and from the mid-nineties onward most of his work was television-based.
