= Topazia Alliata =

Italian painter, curator, art dealer and writer

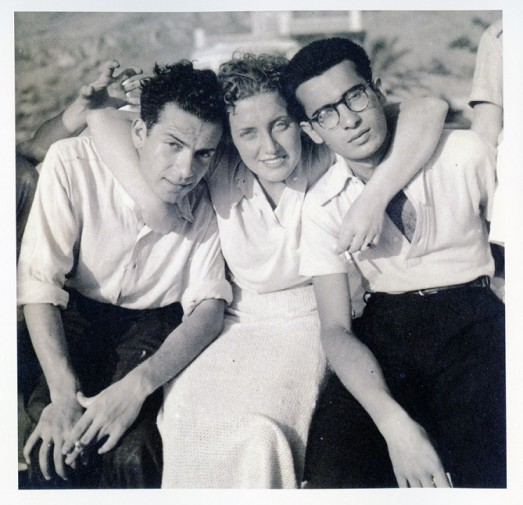
- Topazia Alliata between Renato Guttuso and Basilio Franchina
- Born: 5 September 1913; Palermo, Sicily, Italy
- Died: 23 November 2015 (aged 102); Rome, Italy
- Occupations: Painter, art curator
- Spouse: Fosco Maraini (m. 1935; div. 1970)
- Children: 3, including Dacia Maraini

Topazia Alliata (Italian pronunciation: [toˈpattsja alˈljaːta]; 5 September 1913 – 23 November 2015) was an Italian painter, curator, art dealer and writer.

== Biography ==
Alliata was born in Palermo to Prince Enrico Maria Alliata di Villafranca, Duke of Salaparuta (1879–1946), and a former opera singer, Oria Maria Amelia "Sonia" Ortúzar Ovalle de Olivares (1892–1981), the daughter of a Chilean diplomat. After graduating from liceo artistico, Alliata studied fine arts at the Accademia di Belle Arti di Palermo, where she was a fellow student of Renato Guttuso, who portrayed her in several of his early paintings.

In 1935 she married Fosco Maraini, at the time an unknown scholar, who would later become an important anthropologist, giving birth one year later to their first child, Dacia Maraini. In 1941 Maraini was invited to teach Italian literature at the Kyoto University and they moved to Japan, where they had two more children, Yuki (registered as Luisa in Italy) and Antonella "Toni". In 1943 the family was deported in a concentration camp in Nagoya following their refusal to swear allegiance to the Republic of Salò. They were released at the end of the war in September 1945, and returned to Italy in 1946, settling in Bagheria, where Alliata engaged in the family business, the Salaparuta's Crow Wines. There, she created a wine called "Colomba platino" and she avoided the sale of the family business until 1959.

In 1955 Alliata and Maraini decided to separate. However, as divorce was illegal in Italy at the time, they were only able to divorce in 1970. Alliata subsequently moved to Rome, where she continued her work as a painter. In 1959 she sold the family wine business and founded Galleria Topazia Alliata in Trastevere, where she mainly exhibited avant-garde painters, including Carla Accardi, Eugene Charlton, Mario and Egidio de Grossi, Jannis Kounellis, Piero Manzoni, Fabio Mauri, Mohamed Melehi and Lucio Pozzi. In 1963 Alliata organized the exhibition "Eight Contemporary Artists from Rome" at the Minneapolis Institute of Arts.

In 1973 Alliata was one of the co-founders of the Guttuso Museum in Bagheria.

In 2014 Alliata published Love Holidays: Quaderni d'amore e di viaggi, a partly photographic autobiography. She died in Rome on 23 November 2015, aged 102.

In 2016 her work was the subject of a large retrospective at Fondazione Sant'Elia in Palermo.

== Works ==
- Eight contemporary artists from Rome: Carla Accardi, Eugene Charlton, Mario and Egidio de Grossi, Fabio Mauri, Mohamed Melehi, Muvolo, Lucio Pozzi: selected by the Galleria Topazia Alliata. [Minnesota]: Minneapolis Institute of Arts, 1963. OCLC 153280875
- Exhibition of paintings by Lucio Pozzi, Charlton and Melehi. 1963. OCLC 501530670
- Per gli 80 anni di Emilio Villa Roma : Le parole gelate, 1994. OCLC 848718182
- Toni Maraini; Topazia Alliata Ricordi d'arte e prigionia di Topazia Alliata, Palermo : Sellerio, 2003. ISBN 9788838918612
- Fosco Maraini; Dacia Maraini; Toni Maraini; Yoi Maraini; Topazia Alliata, Love holidays Milano : Rizzoli, 2014. ISBN 9788817074957
