= Maraini =

Maraini is an Italian surname. Notable people with the surname include:

- Fosco Maraini (1912–2004), Italian ethnologist, photographer, film-maker, mountaineer, writer, and professor
- Dacia Maraini (born 1936), Italian novelist, daughter of Fosco
