= Villa Palagonia =

Baroque villa near Palermo, Sicily

Coordinates: 38°04′47″N 13°30′41″E

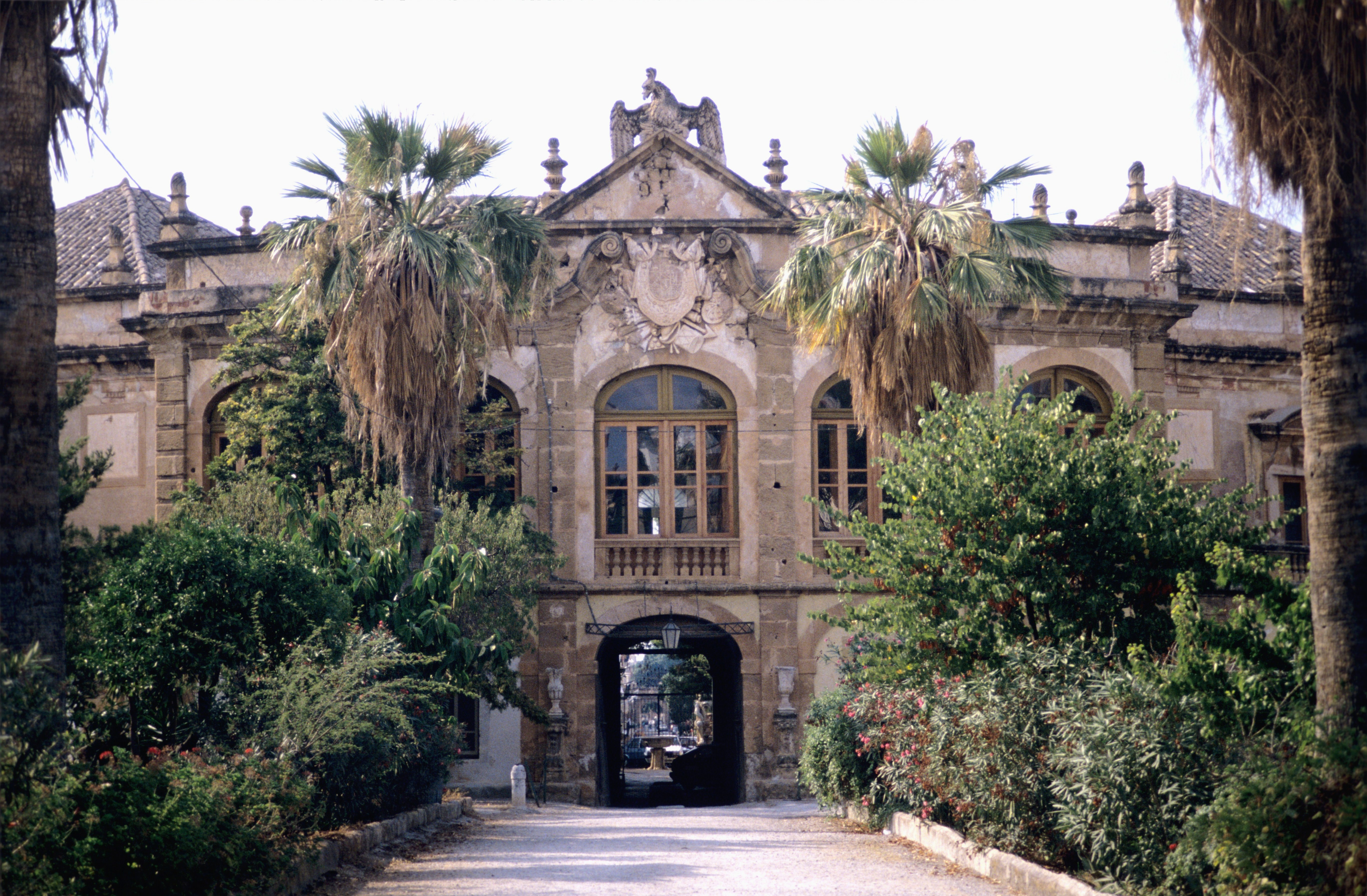
A view of Villa Palagonia

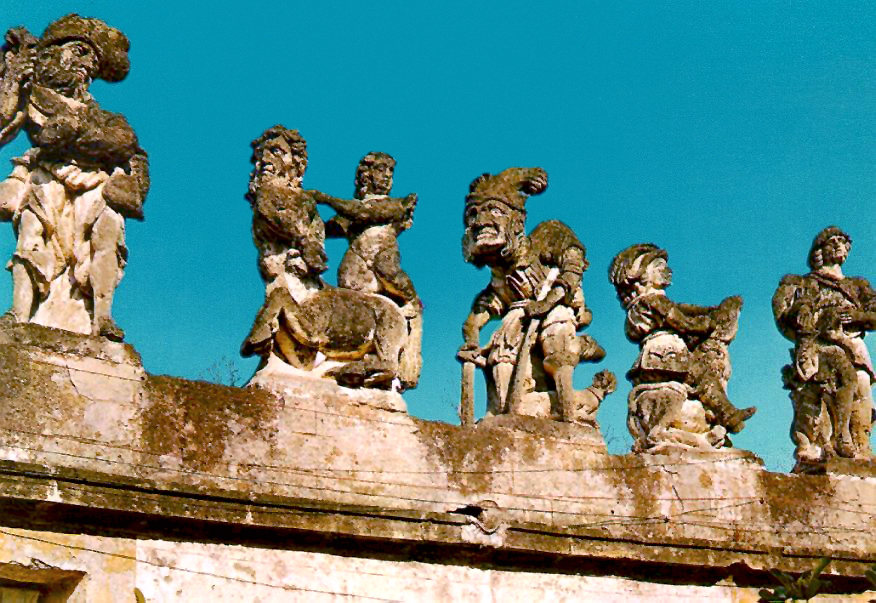
Villa Palagonia monsters statues

The Villa Palagonia is a patrician villa in Bagheria, 15 km from Palermo, in Sicily, southern Italy. The villa itself, built from 1715 by the architect Tommaso Napoli with the help of Agatino Daidone, is one of the earliest examples of Sicilian Baroque. However, its popularity comes mainly from the statues of monsters with human faces that decorate its garden and its wall, and earned it the nickname of "The Villa of Monsters" (Villa dei Mostri).

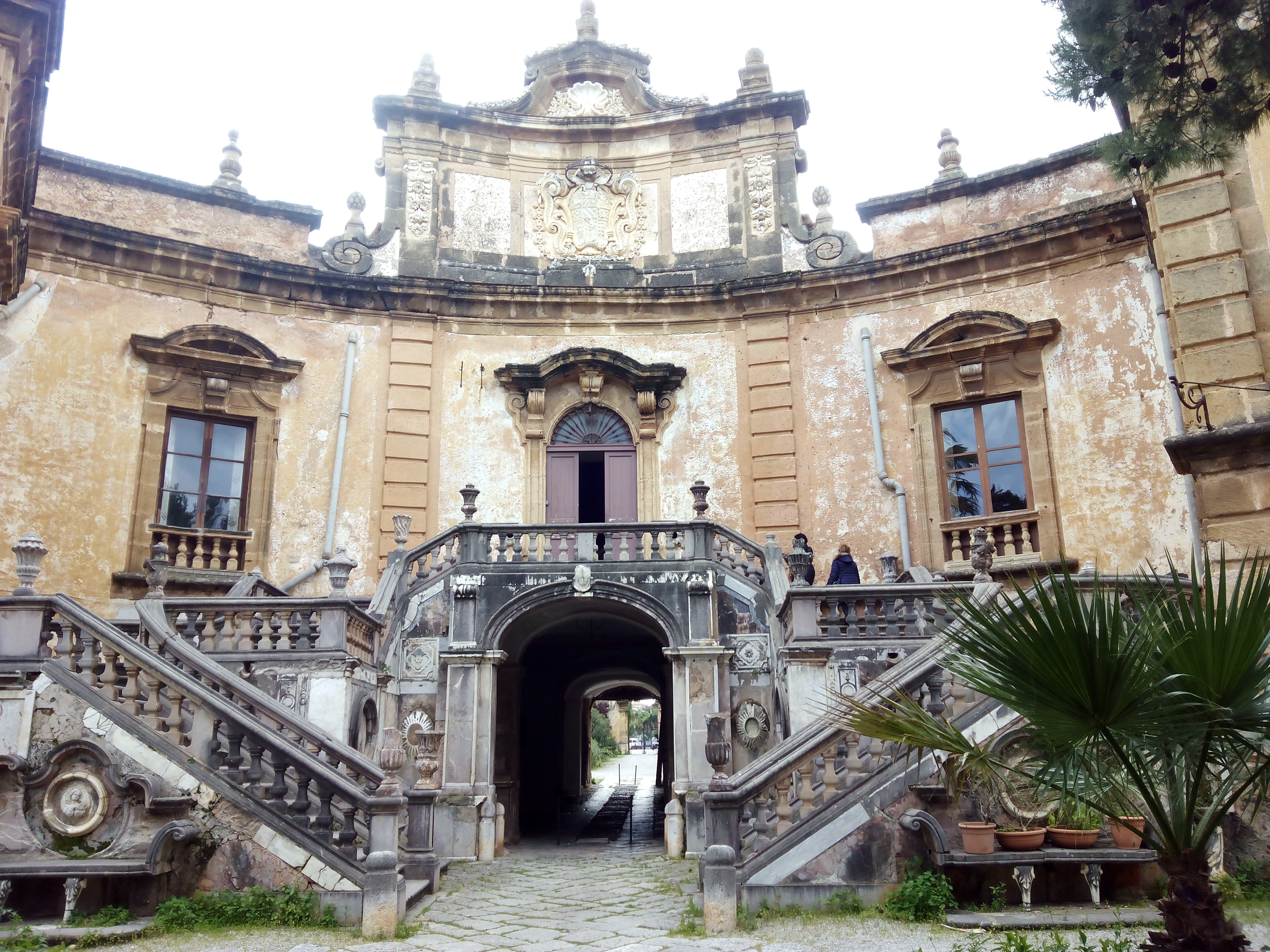
Courtyard of the villa

This series of grotesques, created from 1749 by Francesco Ferdinando II Gravina, Prince of Palagonia, aroused the curiosity of the travellers of the Grand Tour during the 18th and 19th centuries, for instance Henry Swinburne, Patrick Brydone, John Soane, Goethe, the Count de Borde, the artist Jean-Pierre Houël or Alexandre Dumas, prior to fascinate surrealists like André Breton or contemporary authors such as Giovanni Macchia and Dominique Fernandez, or the painter Renato Guttuso.

In 1885, the villa was bought by private individuals, whose heirs are still in possession, and is partially open to the public.

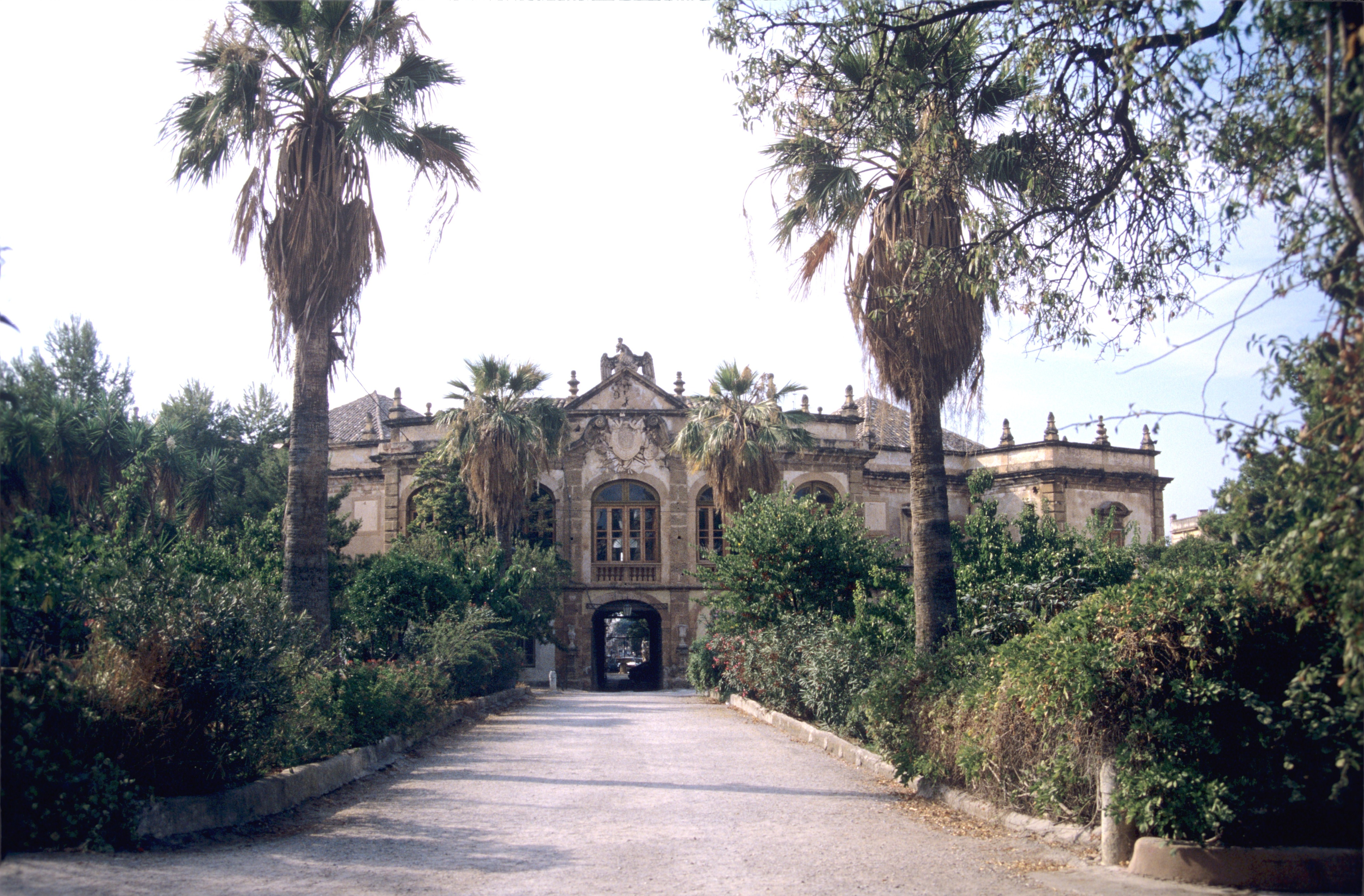
Another view

Villa Palagonia has been one of the venues for music concerts held within the framework of the Concert Season of Bagheria (Stagione Concertistica Città di Bagheria) initiative since 2017, with free entrance.

== Palagonìa and Mineo ==
Palagonìa and Mineo are in a rocky area rich in caves, some used as tombs. One of them, the tomb 15 of Mineo (St. Febronia), has an inscription with letters high 8.5/6 cm on the right side and 13/10 cm on the left. Paleographic studies of the funerary inscriptions date the tombs to the VII century BC. Similar archeological findings were made in Licodia Eubea, Sciri (with affinities to the etruscan Tarquinia) and Mendolito (Adrano), showing a close connection between the Sicels and the population living in the central Italy like the Etruscans.

== Sources ==
- Claude Arthaud, Les Palais du rêve, Arthaud, 1970 (in French)
- Michel-Jean, comte de Borch, Lettres sur la Sicile et sur l'île de Malte, 1782 Extraits en ligne
- (in English) Patrick Brydone, A Tour Through Sicily and Malta: In a Series of Letters to William Beckford, Esq. of Somerly in Suffolk (1st ed. 1773)
- (in French) Alexandre Dumas, Impressions de voyage
- (in French) Dominique Fernandez, Le Radeau de la Gorgone (Promenades en Sicile), photographies de Ferrante Ferranti, Grasset, 1988
- (in French) Dominique Fernandez, Le Voyage d'Italie (Dictionnaire amoureux), photographies de Ferrante Ferranti, Plon, 1997
- (in French) Goethe, Voyage en Italie, 1787
- (in French) P. Hachet, Psychanalyse d'un choc esthétique : La villa Palagonia et ses visiteurs, L'Harmattan, 2002
- (in French) Giovanni Macchia, Le Prince de Palagonia, Quai Voltaire, 1987
- (in French) Dacia Maraini, Retour à Bagheria, Seuil, 2004
- (in English) E. H. Neil, Architecture in context : The Villas of Bagheria, Sicily, Harvard University, 1995
- (in French) Madeleine Pinault, Catalogue de l'exposition Houël, Voyage en Sicile, 1776-1779, musée du Louvre, RMN
- (in Italian) Mario Praz, Bellezza e bizzarria, 1960
- (in French) Mario Praz, Le Jardin des sens, Christian Bourgois, 1975
- (in Italian) F. Santapà, Villa Palagonia a Bagheria, Palermo, Palma, 1968
- (in Italian) R. Scaduto, Villa Palagonia: storia e restauro, Bagheria, E. M. Falcone, 2007
- (in Italian) Ferdinando Scianna, La Villa dei mostri, Einaudi, 1977
- (in English) Henry Swinburne, Travels in the Two Sicilies, 1777-1780, Cadell & Elmsly, London, 1790
- (in Italian) N. Tedesco, Villa Palagonia, Palermo, 1988
- (in French) Angheli Zalapì, Demeures de Sicile, préface de Gioacchino Lanza Tomasi, photographies de Melo Minnella, Könemann, 2000

== Filmography ==
- Several scenes of L'Avventura (1960), by Michelangelo Antonioni, with Monica Vitti, were filmed at the Villa Palagonia. Filming of the scenes from L'Avventura are featured in Baaria (2009), which is set in Bagheria by director Giuseppe Tornatore.
- Several scenes of Mafioso (1962), by Alberto Lattuada, with Alberto Sordi.
- In The Wedding Director (2006), by Marco Bellocchio, Sami Frey plays the part of a descendant of the Prince Gravina di Palagonia.

== See also ==
- Villa Spedalotto
- Palazzo Valguarnera-Gangi
- Villa Francia
