= Angela Bianchini =

Italian writer and literary critic (1921–2018)

- Born: 21 April 1921; Rome, Kingdom of Italy
- Died: 27 October 2018 (aged 97); Rome, Italy
- Occupations: Writer and literary critic

Angela Bianchini (Italian pronunciation: [ˈandʒela bjaŋˈkiːni]; 21 April 1921 – 27 October 2018) was an Italian fiction writer and literary critic of Jewish descent. She grew up in Italy and emigrated to the United States in 1941, after Mussolini's openly antisemitic racial laws were enacted.

== Education and early career ==
Bianchini spent her "years in waiting" (to use Giovanni Macchia's expression) at Johns Hopkins University where she completed a Ph.D. in French Linguistics under the guidance and supervision of Leo Spitzer. The presence and lectures of a group of Spanish exiles (among whom Pedro Salinas and Jorge Guillén) determined some of her major interests in the field of Spanish literature: in particular the great 20th century poetry and 19th century novel.

After her return to Rome after the war, Bianchini was attracted to the world of communication and collaborated not only with such prestigious periodicals as Il Mondo of Mario Pannunzio, but also with RAI (the Italian Broadcasting Corporation). For RAI she wrote several cultural broadcasts, radio plays and original radio and T.V. programs.

She had many literary studies to her credit. She was one of the first literary critics to study serial novels in La luce a gas e il feuilleton: due invenzioni dell'Ottocento (Liguori, 1969, reprinted in 1989). She translated Medieval French Novels (Romanzi medievali d'amore e d'avventura, Grandi Libri Garzanti, now reprinted and in CD-ROM), and edited a Renaissance correspondence (Lettere della fiorentina Alessandra Macinghi Strozzi, Garzanti, 1989). In her book Voce donna (Frassinelli, 1979, reprinted in 1996) she combined a study of feminism with her interests in biography and in narrative technique. For the last thirty years of her life she contributed to La Stampa (Turin) and to its book-review section Tuttolibri, especially on Spanish themes. Bianchini died of natural causes in Rome on 27 October 2018 at the age of 97.

== Works ==
Bianchini began her career in fiction with the short stories of Lungo equinozio (Lerici Ed., 1962; Senator Borletti Prize for a First Work, 1962), which deal with the lives of women who live in Italy and in America. Here for the first time she explored her recurring theme of departures and arrivals. Giorgio Caproni, in a book review, commented enthusiastically on Bianchini's technique and on the texture of her stories, composed of everyday sentences and of scattered events against which stand out significant figures and particular historical moments. Carlo Bo, meanwhile, praised Bianchini's knowledge of the human heart and her sincerity and literary authenticity. Bianchini contributed the short story "Alta estate notturna" to the anthology of women writers Il pozzo segreto (ed. M. R. Cutrufelli, R. Guacci, M. Rusconi, Giunti, 1993) and the short story "Anni dopo" ("Years Later") to the anthology Nella città proibita (ed. M. R. Cutrufelli, Tropea, 1997. In the Forbidden City University of Chicago Press, 2000).

== Novels ==
Bianchini also penned several novels.

- Le Nostre Distanze (Mondadori 1965. Reprinted by Einaudi in 2001)
- La Ragazza in Nero (Camunia 1990, Frassinelli 2004, Rapallo Prize 1990, translated as The Girl in Black by G. Sanguinetti Katz and A. Urbancic, Canadian Society for Italian Studies 2002)
- Capo d'Europa, (Camunia 1990, reprinted by Frassinelli Tascabile 1998, finalist for the Strega Prize 1991, Donna-Città di Roma Prize 1992, translated as The Edge of Europe by A. M. Jeannet and D. Castronuovo, University of Nebraska Press 2000)
- Le Labbra tue Sincere (Frassinelli 1995)
- Un amore sconveniente (Frassinelli 1999, Castiglioncello Costa degli Etruschi Prize 2000, finalist for the Rapallo Prize 2000 )
- Nevada (Frassinelli 2002)
- Alessandra e Lucrezia. Destini femminili nella Firenze del Quattrocento (Mondadori, 2005)

== Bibliography ==
- Jeannet, Angela M. "Afterword:Exiles and Returns in Angela Bianchini's Fiction" in Angela Bianchini. The Edge of Europe. Trans. A.M. Jeannet and D. Castronuovo. Lincoln and London: University of Nebraska Press, 2000, pp. 105–137.
- Barberi Squarotti, Giorgio. "Bianchini: fine di una solitudine." La Stampa, 3 March 1990.
- Cutrufelli, Maria Rosa. "Quel sottile bisogno di vita quotidiana" L'Unita, 1 April 1990.
