= Paola Ghirotti =

Italian photographer (born 1955)

Paola Ghirotti (born February 2, 1955) is an Italian photographer.

From 1990 to the 1994 she was credited for taking photographs of the Formula One motor race.

She edited the special edition of Limes bimonthly Italian geopolitical magazine "Japan: This mystery", which was published in 2007.

She was given an unusual degree of access to the disaster area few weeks after the 2011 earthquake off the Pacific coast of Tōhoku (東北地方太平洋沖地震, Tōhoku-chihō Taiheiyō Oki Jishin). The ambassador of Japan in Italy had given her an official recognition for the expressions of solidarity and kindness towards the victims in Tohoku.

She is a member of AISTUGIA – Italian Association for Japanese Studies.

== Books ==
- il Giappone degli uomini mito, by Marco Panara, Giovanni Carrada, Paola Ghirotti, Armando Curcio, 1990
- Le cronache del Caffè greco, Fratelli Palombi Editori, 1987
- Il Vittoriano. Materiali per una storia, Fratelli Palombi, 1986–88
- Franco Zagari, Giardino Italiano a Osaka, Edizioni Over 1990
- un Giappone, Paola Ghirotti and Hori Yasue, Diego Mormorio, Marco Panara, Franco Zagari, Fratelli Palombi Editori, 1995
- La via Crucis di Francesco Messina a San Giovanni Rotondo, by Monsignore Crispino Valenziano
- Le Japon des Japonais, Éditions Liana Lévi
- le Maroc des Marocains, Éditions Liana Lévi
- La Chine des Chinois, by Hania Arentsen and Paola Ghirotti, Éditions Liana Lévi
- Japan: This mystery , the notebook Limes, The Gruppo Editoriale l'Espresso 2007.
- Jidai Matsuri 1990-2020 archive photos by Paola Ghirotti, unGiappone-Casadei Libri, 2020
- Una Cina, 1985-2003 - [archive] photos by Paola Ghirotti, 2021 unGiappone
- Maroc festival national des arts populaires - [archive] photos by Paola Ghirotti, 2022 unGiappone
- Chadō – Joan – Katsura Rikyū, album Japanese garden - [archive] photos by Paola Ghirotti, 2023 unGiappone

== Exhibitions ==
- 1996 Roma – Una festa per gli occhi – La cultura del gusto, Akimoto Shigeru and Paola Ghirotti,

introduction of the exhibition by Fosco Maraini, Istituto Giapponese di Cultura Rome /The Japan Foundation

- 1996 Kyoto – Kyoto: details of spring and autumn, Goethe Institut Kansai
- 1999 Roma – L'acqua in architettura, American Academy in Rome
- 2001 Gifu – Italia no bi, Japan no bi, The beauty of Italian and Japanese beauty. Fine art Museum
- 2014 Roma – Ayrton Senna, at the speed of the heart
- 2014 Ischia – Ayrton Senna, at the speed of the heart
- 2016 Minamisōma – watashi wa wasurenai
- 2016 Urbino – 日本の美、ウルビーノの美 Appunti di bellezza: Japan no bi, Urbino no bi
- 2019 Gifu – Watashi wa wasurenai
- 2019 Todi – #meuAyrton, Ayrton Senna at Heart Speed
- 2023 Todi – U.N.A. United Nations of Artists, by Matteo Boetti: widespread program involved 88 artists
- 2025 Urbino – #meuAyrton - Senna alla velocità del cuore, Urbino
