= Diego D'Amico =

Italian politician (1893–1947)

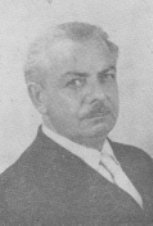
Diego D'Amico

Diego D'Amico (29 September 1893, Bagheria – 6 August 1947) was an Italian politician. He represented the Christian Democracy in the Constituent Assembly of Italy from 1946 to 1947.
