= Tommaso Napoli =

Italian architect (1659–1725)

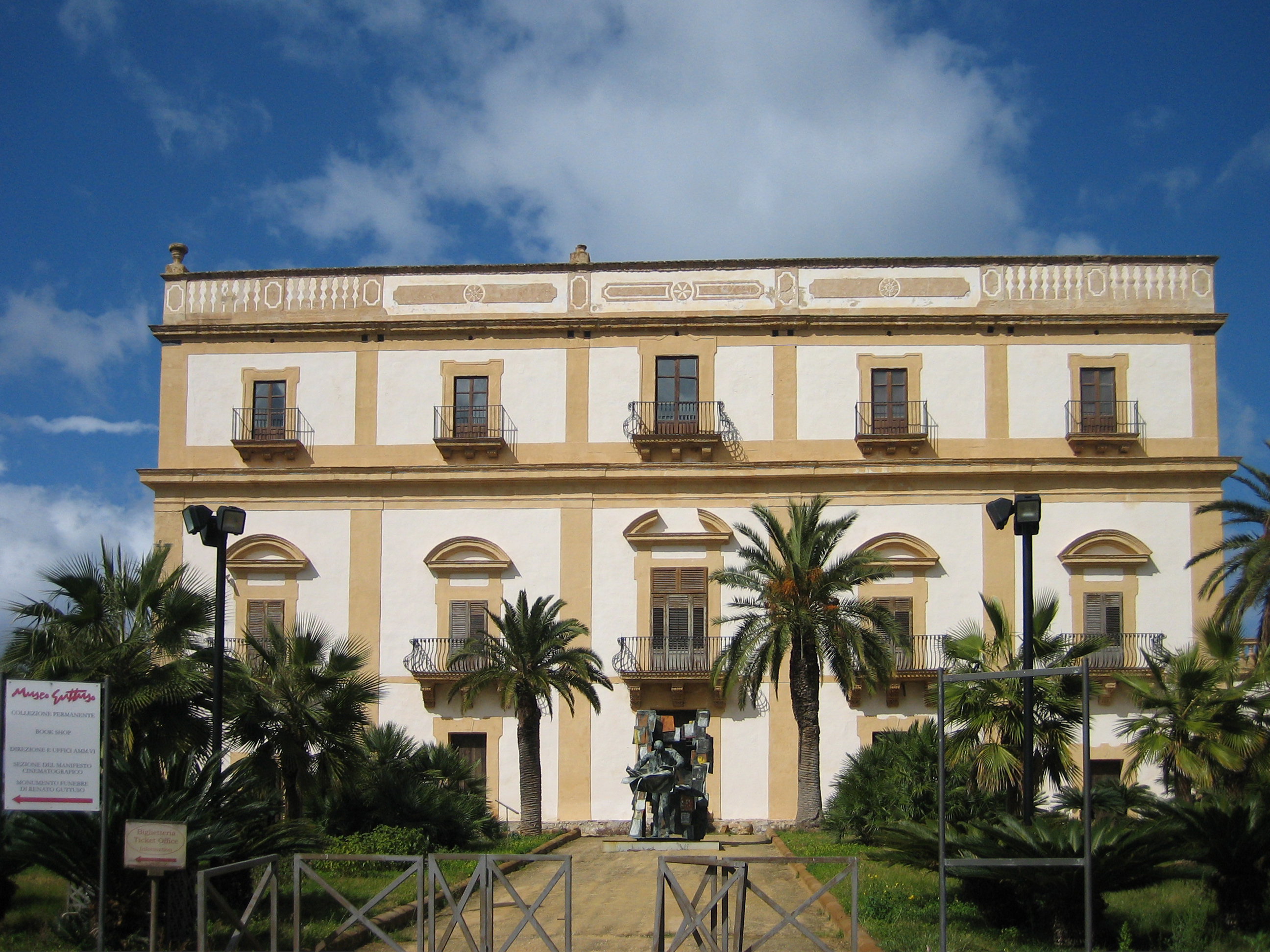
Villa Valguarnera, begun in 1712, for Marianna del Bosco (Princess of Cattolica).

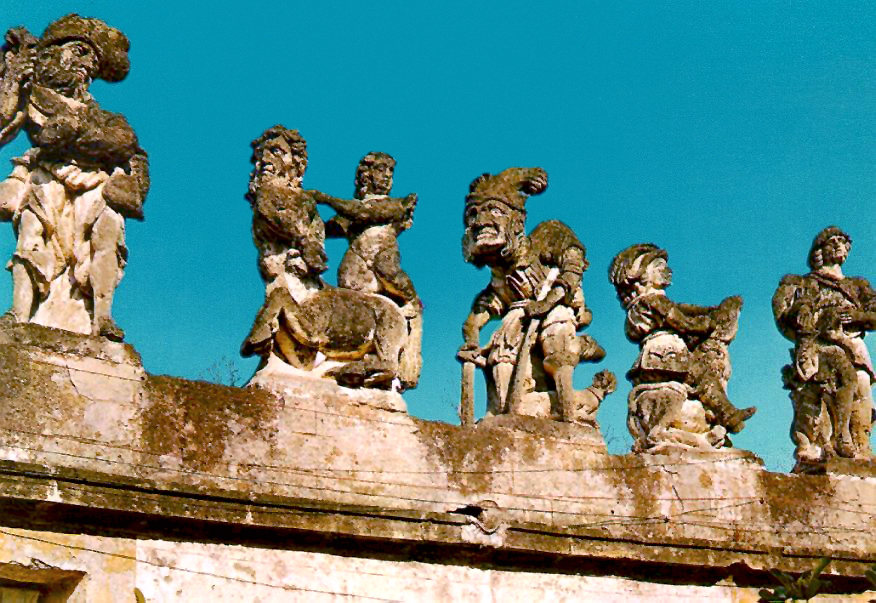
Villa Palagonia. "Dei Monstri" a series of sculpture of Grotesques which adorn the parapet of the villa

Tommaso Maria Napoli (16 April 1659 – 12 June 1725) was an Italian architect, Dominican Order friar, engineer and mathematician.

== Biography ==
Born at Palermo, Tommaso Napoli received his training under Andrea Cirrincione as a novitiate in the Convento di San Domenico. His first architectural experience was in the construction of the church of San Domenico designed by Cirrincione. Napoli, the son of silversmith, was fervent member of the Dominican order and published at least two treatise on civil and military architecture. He travelled extensively including stays in Naples, Rome, Vienna, and Ragusa (modern Dubrovnik). He visited Vienna on numerous occasions often in service to the Imperial Court. From 1689 to 1700 he was the official architect of the Republic of Ragusa. He assisted in the ongoing reconstruction of that city after the earthquake of 1667. He made significant contributions to the construction of the new Cathedral, altering the plans made by Bufalini, and to the Rector's palace where in 1691-2 he designed the new chapel. He returned to Palermo by 1711 and served as the Military Architect of the City and later as Architect of Royal Patrimony. He brought to Sicily an understanding of the baroque architecture of the Austrian empire, especially the works of Johann Bernhard Fischer von Erlach, best known for his design of Schönbrunn Palace. However Napoli's works also have affinities with the architecture of Carlo Fontana and his contemporaries and followers in Rome especially the Accademia di San Luca.

== Works ==
Tommaso Maria Napoli is best known for two villas in Bagheria, Sicily, which set him apart from his Sicilian contemporaries. These villas are the Villa Valguarnera begun in 1712 for Marianna del Bosco (Princess of Cattolica), and the Villa Palagonia begun in 1715 for Ferdinando Francesco Gravina, Prince of Palagonia.

Valguarnera, built around a courtyard with long curving arms that reference both the earlier villas of Palladio and Bernini's Piazza for St. Peter's in Rome. The three storeyed main facade of the villa has a concave bay at its centre, in which is set an external staircase leading to the piano nobile. The balustraded roof line is adorned by statuary. The piece de resistance of the villa however, is a large terrace and parterre, also designed by Napoli, overlooking the bay and Solunto, this is considered to be the finest view in Sicily.

The Villa Palagonia, the larger and more complex of the two, has curved facades of two storeys. The piano nobile is denoted by large arched windows. The rear facade is a great curve, flanked by two straight wings. The plan is a modified pentagon and so recalls renaissance models like Vignola's Caprarola and other fortified villas. A prominent feature of the villa is the external staircase. Of even more complex design than the stairs in the concave at Valguarnera, a double staircase consisting of straight flights, which repeatedly change direction against the straight and curves of the villa's external walls. It is not clear if either of these staircase designs should be attributed to Napoli as they were constructed in later decades. Similarly, the interior of the villa with polychrome marble walls and mirrored ceilings was completed long after Napoli's presence. The Villa Palagonia was a favorite stop for travellers on the Grand Tour like Patrick Brydone, the Comte de Borch, Goethe, and John Soane among many others.

Napoli also designed the piazza in front of the church of San Domenico in Palermo with its column dedicated to the Immacolata. He received imperial support from the court in Vienna for this project. The design for the column was altered after Napoli's death by Giovanni Biagio Amico. At the now destroyed Convent of the Sette Angeli in Palermo he designed and completed a protected terrace that allowed the cloistered nuns to view the dramatic procession of Santa Rosalia.

He published two short treatises: Utriusque Architecturae Compendium... (1688) and Breve ristretto dell'architettura militare... (1723).

== Sources ==
- Blunt, Anthony (1968). Sicilian Baroque. Weidenfeld & Nicolson.
