= Nina Rootes =

Nina Rootes is a translator of French and Italian literature. An award-winning translator, she has also published a novel, several short stories and an autobiographical book.

== Life ==
Rootes travelled to Italy in 1958, and found herself working in the movie business there. She later married a film editor, and lived and worked in Toronto, Madrid and Rome. Her translation of Sky Memoirs by Blaise Cendrars won the Florence Gould Translation Prize in 1993.

== Works ==
=== Translations ===
- The astonished man: a novel by Blaise Cendrars, 1970. Translated from the French L'homme foudroyé.
- Planus by Blaise Cendrars, 1972. Translated from the French Bourlinguer
- Memoirs of a female thief by Dacia Maraini, 1973. Translated from the Italian Memorie di una ladra.
- Lice by Blaise Cendrars, 1973. Translated with revisions from the French La main coupeé.
- I was a Kamikaze. The Knights of the Divine Wind by Ryuji Nagatsuka, 1973. Translated from the French J'etais un Kamikazé les chevaliers du vent divin. With an introduction by Pierre Clostermann
- Amacord. Portrait of a town by Federico Fellini, with Tonino Guera. Translated from the Italian.
- The art of eating in France: manners and menus in the nineteenth century by Jean-Paul Aron. Translated from the French.
- Les onze mill verges: or, The amorous adventures of Prince Mony Vibescu by Guillaume Apollinaire, 1976. With an introduction by Richard N. Coe. Translated from the French.
- The Gnostics by Jacques Lacarrière, 1976. Translated from the French Les gnostiques. With a foreword by Lawrence Durrell.
- Gold: the marvellous history of General John Augustus Sutter by Blaise Cendrars, 1982. Translated from the French L'or, ou, La merveilleuse histoire du General Johann August Sutter.
- The knockabout by Blaise Cendrars, 1982
- Dan Yack by Blaise Cendrars, 1987. Translated from the French.
- Behind the image: the art of reading paintings by Federico Zeri, 1990. Translated from the Italian Dietro l'immagine.
- The empire of sleep by Henri-Frédéric Blanc. Translated from the French Empire du sommeil.
- Sky: memoirs by Blaise Cendrars, 1996.
- (tr. with Andrée Masoin de Virton) The wheel of fortune: the autobiography of Edith Piaf by Edith Piaf, 2004

=== Other ===
- Mary Dexter, Mary Sinister, 1983
- The frog prince, 1985
- Adventures in the movie biz, 2013
