= Aspra =

Aspra may refer to:

- Aspra, Sicily
- Aspra, Vima Mică, a village, part of Vima Mică
- Aspra Spitia, Elis
- Aspra Spitia, Viotia
- Aspra Sabina
- Aspra, a brand name for the drug omeprazole
