= Villa Valguarnera =

Building in Bagheria, Italy

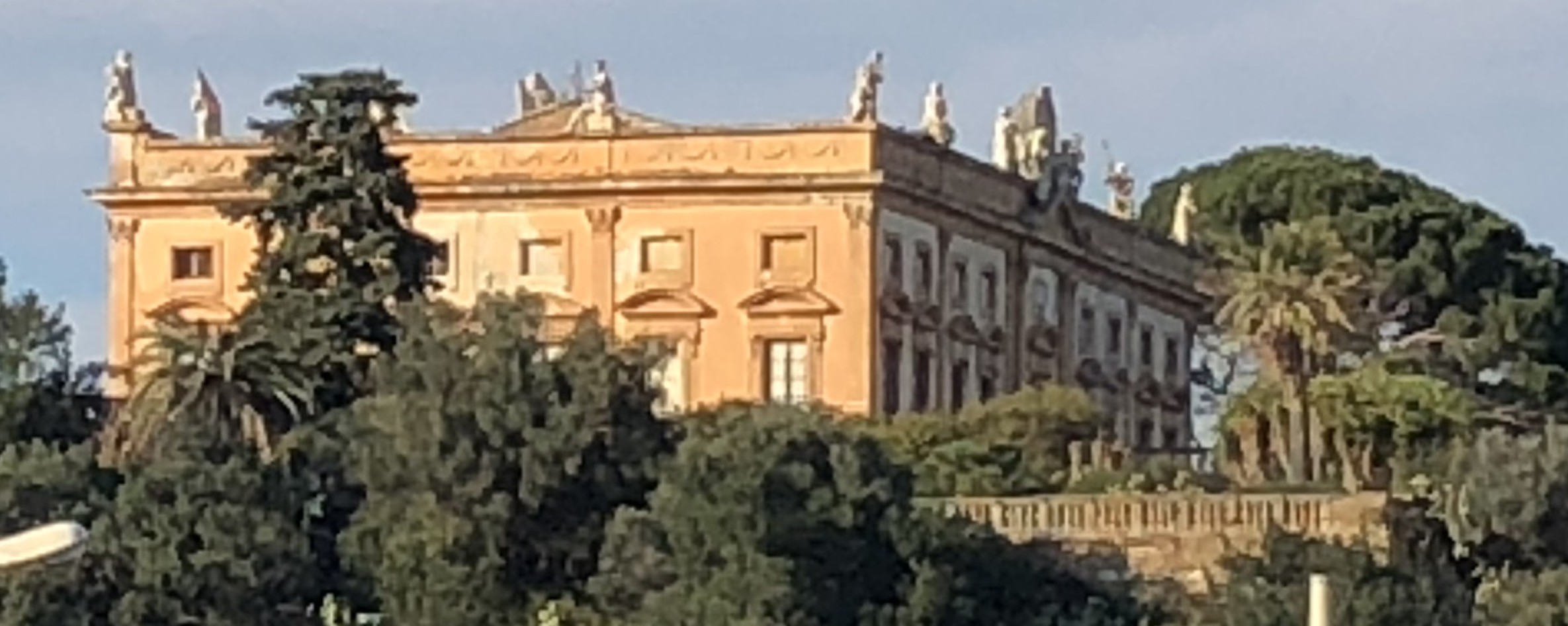
- Villa Valguarnera, exterior
- Interactive map of the Villa Valguarnera area

General information
- Type: Villa
- Architectural style: Baroque
- Location: Bagheria, Metropolitan City of Palermo, Sicily, Italy
- Construction started: 1712
- Completed: 1761
- Client: Valguarnera family

Villa Valguarnera is an 18th-century villa in Bagheria, in the Metropolitan City of Palermo. It is known as little Versailles.

== History ==
The villa was originally designed for Princess Maria Anna of Gravina by Tommaso Napoli in 1712, and later continued by Giovan Battista Cascione after Napoli's death in 1725. It was eventually finished only in 1761, when it was inherited by Maria Anna's niece Princess Donna Maria Anna Valguarnera. Influenced bu Enlightenment, Valguarnera modified the original project, and enlisted mathematician and architect Niccolò Cento to integrate numerous Masonic symbols into the estate's interiors and grounds. Cento also designed a site plan resembling a monumental key from an aerial perspective, ending in a three-nave temple adjoining the circular courtyard. Among the guests hosted at the villa were Johann Wolfgang von Goethe, Louis Philippe I, Maria Amalia of Naples and Sicily, Maria Carolina of Austria, Karl Friedrich Schinkel, Rudolf Steiner, Carl Linnaeus, Helena Blavatsky and Jiddu Krishnamurti.

Differently by many historic villas of the era, the villa has not been modernized, and has preserved its original appearance. In 2015, it served as the setting for a Dolce & Gabbana commercial directed by Giuseppe Tornatore and starring Sophia Loren. In 2019, it was used as a location in Ferzan Özpetek's film The Goddess of Fortune. In 2020, it hosted the wedding ceremony between Radiohead's singer Thom Yorke and actress Dajana Roncione. In 2026, it was chosen by singer Dua Lipa and actor Callum Turner for their second wedding ceremony.
