= Metasemantic poetry =

Literary technique theorized and used by Fosco Maraini

Metasemantic poetry (from the Greek μετά "after" and σημαντικός "significant") is a literary technique theorized and used by Fosco Maraini in his collection of poems Gnòsi delle fànfole of 1978.

== Overview ==
While semantics is that part of linguistics that studies the meaning of words (lexical semantics), of the sets of words, of phrases (phrasal semantics), and of texts, metasemantics, in the sense given by the Maraini, goes beyond the meaning of words and consists of the use, within the text, of words without meaning, but having a familiar sound to the language to which the text itself belongs, and which must still follow the syntactical and grammatical rules (in the case of Fosco Maraini, the Italian language). One can attribute more or less arbitrary meanings to these words by their sound and their position within the text.

A language similar to this technique, mostly defined as nonsense, was also used by Lewis Carroll in his poem Jabberwocky published in 1871.

Other examples of proto-metasemantic expressions in the English language date back to the beginning of 16th century with the onomatopoeic sounds typical of gibberish.

The most famous example of metasemantic poetry, in the original meaning of the term as given by Maraini, is his poem Il Lonfo, also known for the recitation made by Gigi Proietti in 2005 (in the transmission of Renzo Arbore Speciale per me - meno siamo meglio stiamo / Special for me - the less we are, the better we are), as well as for its recitation in the episode on February 7, 2007, the program Parla con me (Talk to Me), conducted on Rai 3 by Serena Dandini.
