= Michelangelo Galioto =

Italian politician (1897–1977)

Michelangelo Galioto (21 March 1897, Bagheria - 16 April 1977) was an Italian politician. He represented the Labour Democratic Party (from 1946 to 1947) and the Italian Liberal Party (from 1947 to 1948) in the Constituent Assembly of Italy.
