= Saraghrar =

Fourth highest independent peak in the Hindu Kush, Pakistan

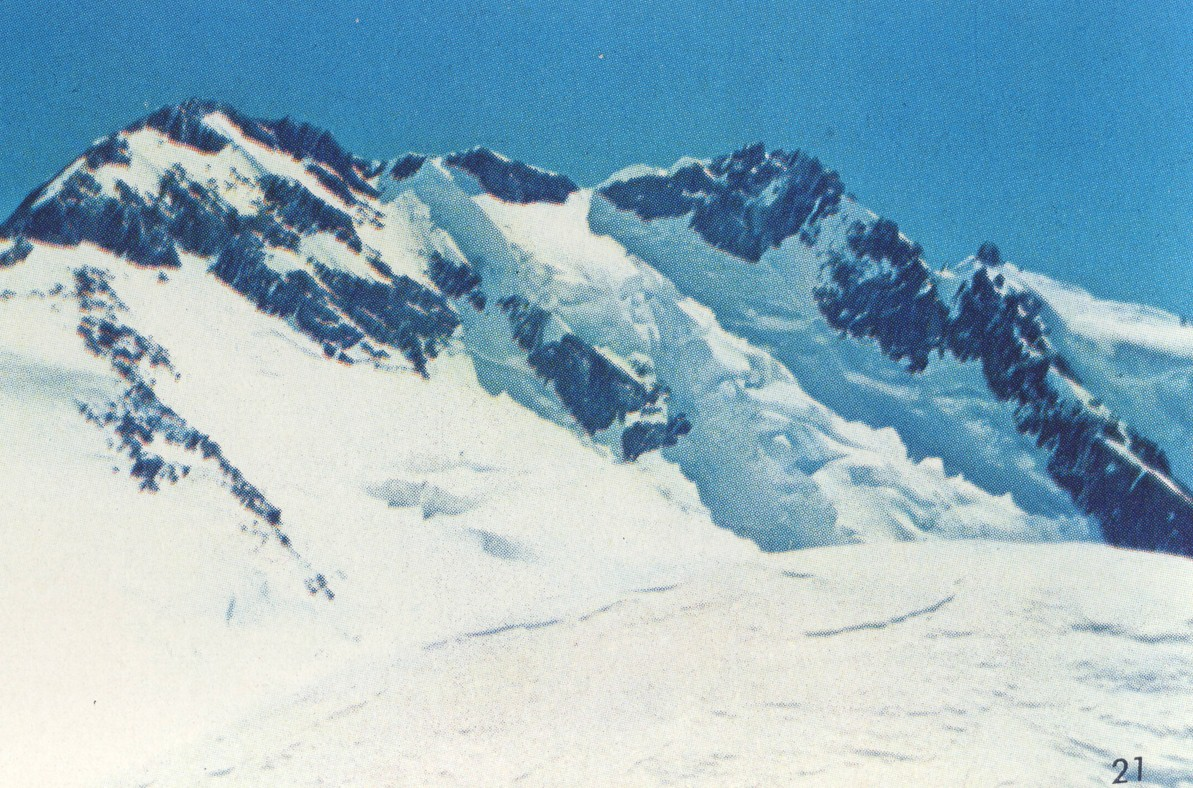

Highest point
- Elevation: 7,340 m (24,080 ft); Ranked 77th
- Prominence: 1,979 m (6,493 ft)
- Listing: Mountains of Pakistan; Ultra
- Coordinates: 36°32′51″N 72°07′00″E

Naming
- Native name: سراغرار

Geography
- Location within Pakistan
- Country: Pakistan
- Province: Khyber Pakhtunkhwa
- Parent range: Hindu Kush

Climbing
- First ascent: 1959
- Easiest route: glacier/snow/ice

Saraghrar (Urdu: سراغرار) is the fourth-highest independent peak in the Hindu Kush and located in Khyber Pakhtunkhwa, Pakistan. The entire Saraghrar massif is a huge, irregularly stretched plateau at elevation around 7,000 m (22,966 ft), lying above vertical granite and ice faces, which protects it all around. Its distinct summits are poorly identified, and information gathered from expeditions that have visited the area is often misleading. The main summits are: NE summit (7,340 m (24,081 ft)), northwest summit (7,300 m (23,950 ft)), southwest summit (7,148 m (23,451 ft)), south summit (7,307 m (23,973 ft)), and southeast summit (7,208 m (23,648 ft)).

== Climbing history ==
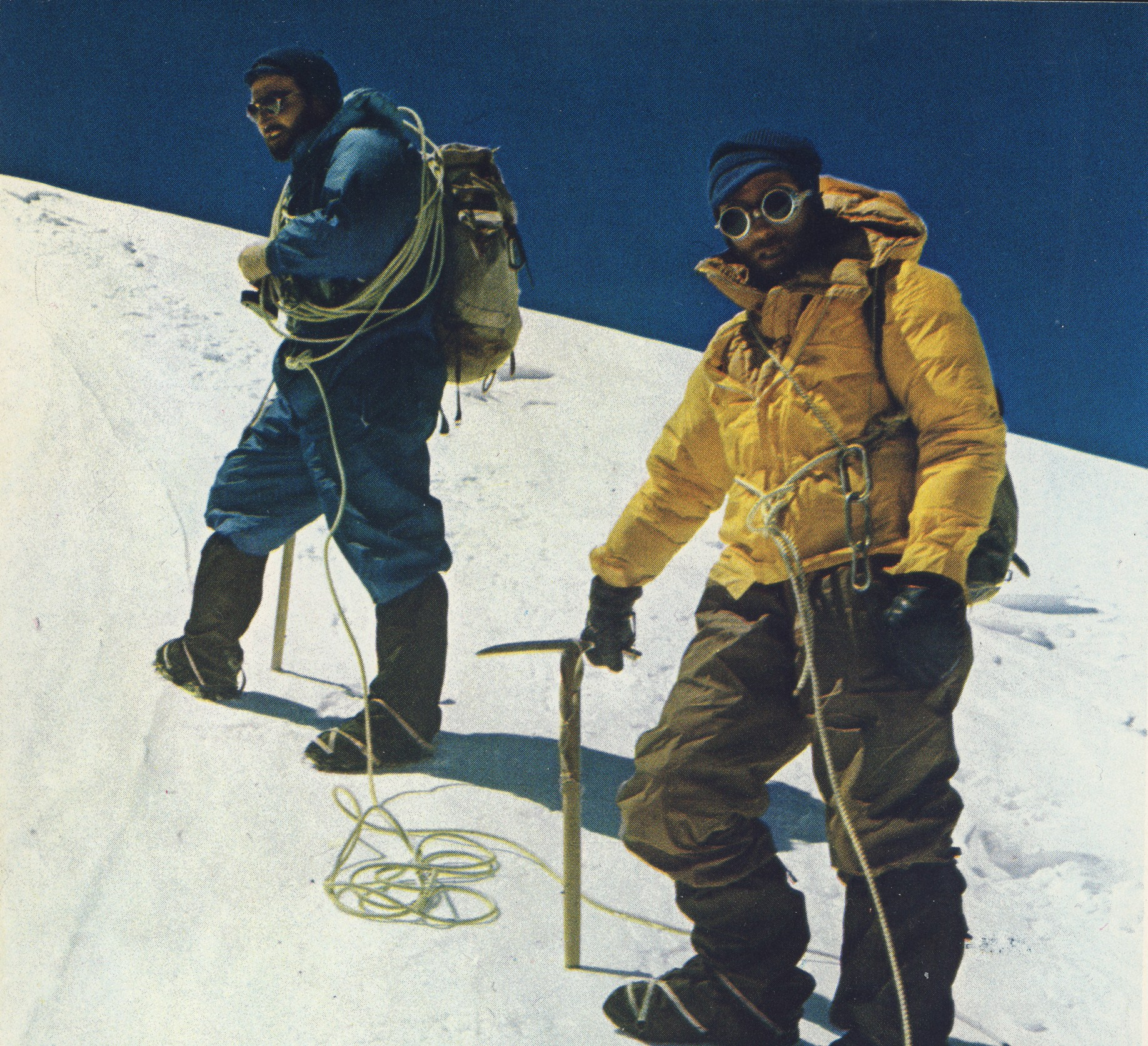
Franco Alletto (left) and Paolo Consiglio during the 1959 ascent

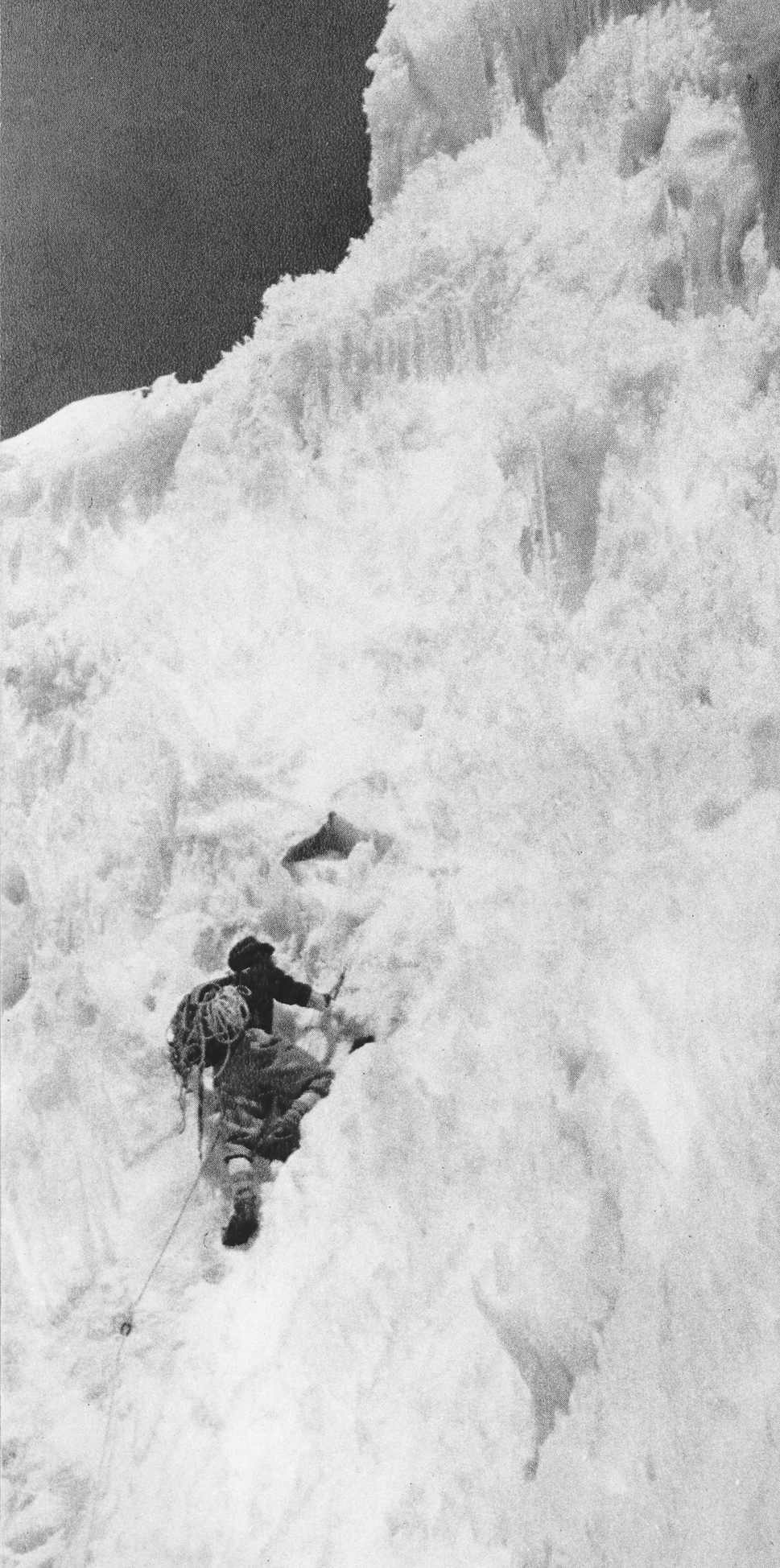
The "ice tower"

In 1958, a British team led by Ted Norrish made the first attempt on the northeast summit (7,340 m (24,080 ft)). This expedition was stopped by the death of member P. S. Nelson.

The year after, on August 24, 1959, the northeast peak was climbed for the first time by an Italian team led by Fosco Maraini and including Franco Alletto, Giancarlo Castelli, Paolo Consiglio, Carlo Alberto "Betto" Pinelli (the latter four reaching the top), Silvio Jovane, Franco Lamberti (expedition's doctor), and Enrico Leone, all members of the Italian Alpine Club (Rome section). They ascended via the Niroghi glacier on the northeast of the massif.

On August 24, 1967, Satoh Yukitoshi and Hara Hirosada, members of a Japanese expedition led by Kenichiro Yamamoto (Mountaineering club of Hitotsubashi University) reached the South Summit for the first time by the Rosh-Gol glacier.

In 1971, Nagano, member of a Japanese expedition (Shizuoka climbing club) led by Akiyama Reiske, summited the SW peak for the first time on July 29.

Three Catalan expeditions in 1975, 1977 and 1982 tried the Northwest summit (7,300 m (23,950 ft)) via the Southwest pillar from the Rosh Gol valley. On August 9, 1982, Juan Lopez Diaz (expedition leader), Enrique Lucas Llop and Nil Bohigas Martorell reached the northwest II summit (7,200 m (23,622 ft)).

In 2005, five members of a Swiss expedition led by Jean-Michel Zweiacker reached the southeast summit (7,208 m (23,648 ft)) for the first time (Mazal Chevallier, Sébastien Grosjean and Yves-Alain Peter on July 24; Marc Bélanger and Jean-Michel Zweiacker on July 29).

In 2021, Georgian mountaineers Archil Badriashvili, Giorgi Tepnadze, and Bakar Gelashvili made the first ascent of Saraghrar Northwest on September 10. The ascent was completed in alpine style over eight days, via the unclimbed NW face from the Rosh Gol valley, and won them the 2022 Piolet d'Or.

== See also ==
- List of highest mountains of the world

== Sources ==
- Paropamiso (by Fosco Maraini, 2003) (Mondadori, Milano, Italy) ISBN 88-04-51209-1
- Chitral Tour Guide Book (by Rahmat Karim Baig, 2004)
- Hindu Kush Study Series (2 Volumes) (by Rahmat Karim Baig, 1994/1997) (Rehmat Printing Press, Peshawar, Pakistan)
