= Bagheria =

Bagheria Baarìa (Sicilian)
- Comune
- Città di Bagheria
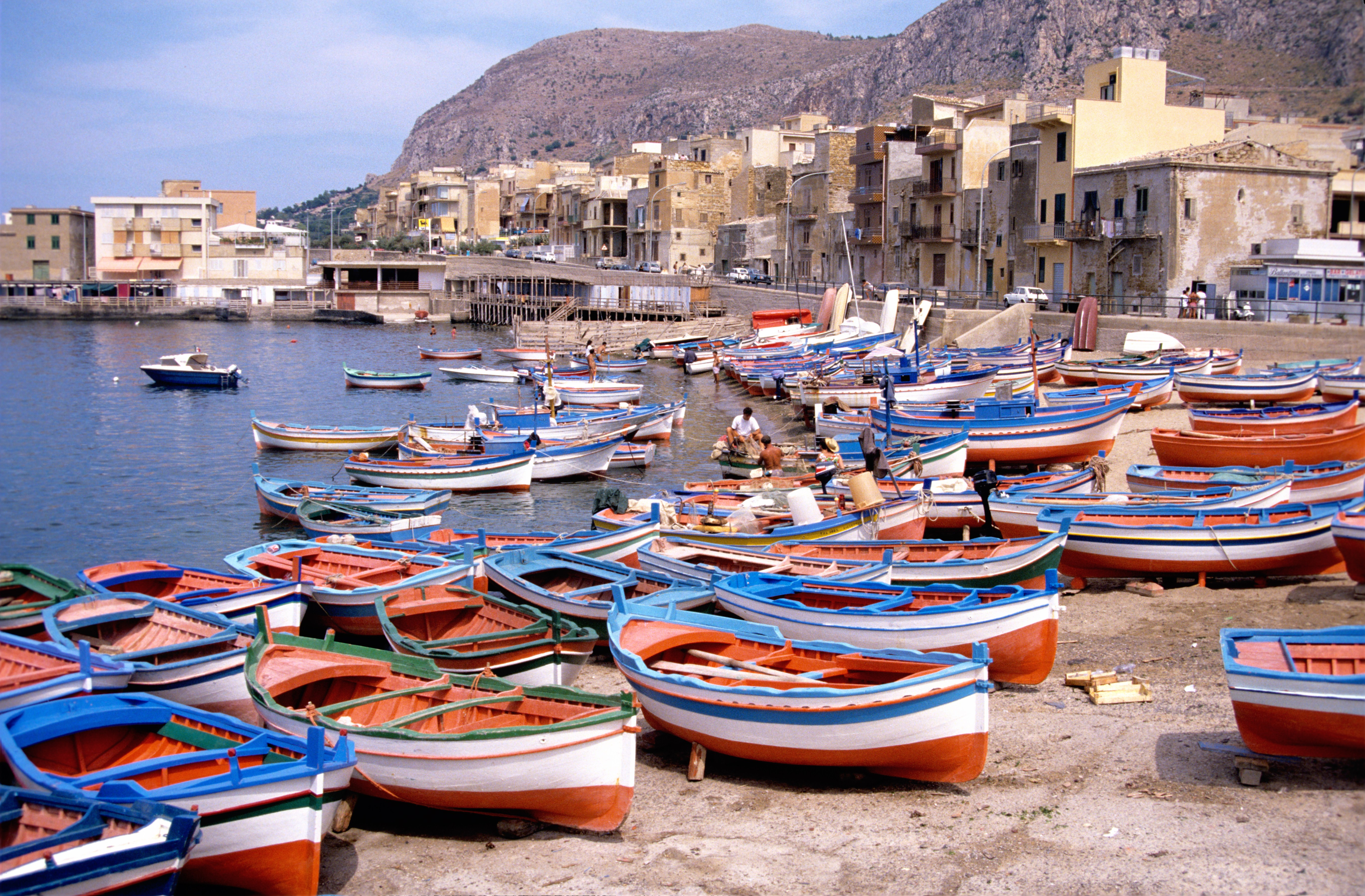
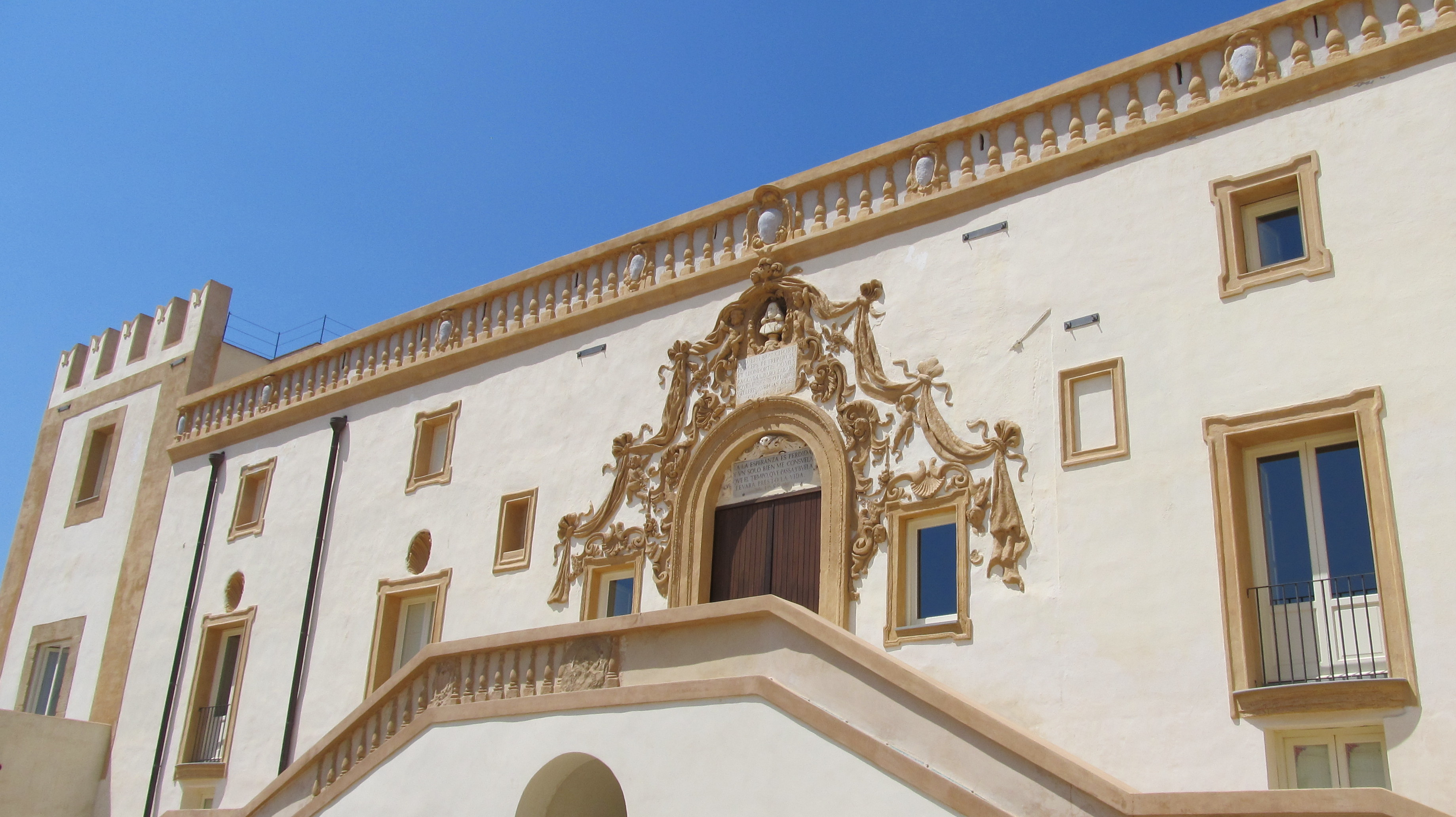
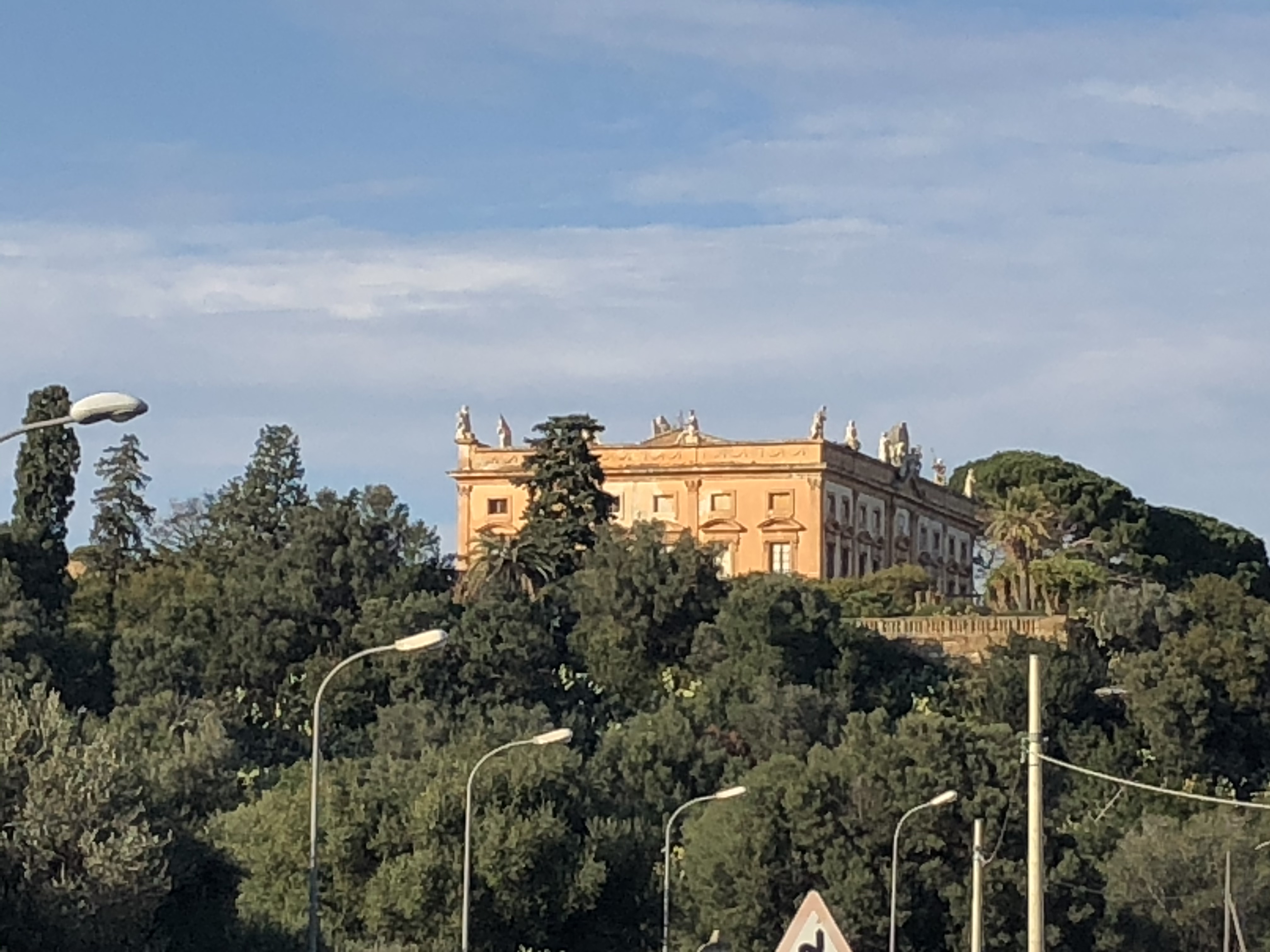
- Fishing boats in Aspra Villa Palagonia Villa Trabia Church of the Holy Sepulchre Palazzo Butera Villa Larderia Villa Valguarnera

- Flag Coat of arms
- Nickname: "Città delle Ville" (City of the Villas)
- Location within Italy Location within Sicily
- Coordinates: 38°04′49″N 13°30′31″E
- Country: Italy
- Region: Sicily
- Metropolitan city: Palermo (PA)
- Founded: September 21st 1826
- Frazioni: Aspra, Sicily

Government
  - Mayor: Filippo Maria Tripoli

Area
  - Total: 29 km^{2} (11 sq mi)
- Elevation: 76 m (249 ft)

Population (31 December 2020)
  - Total: 53,149
  - Density: 1,800/km^{2} (4,700/sq mi)
- Demonym: Bagheresi (Baarioti in Sicilian)
- Time zone: UTC+1 (CET)
  - Summer (DST): UTC+2 (CEST)
- Postal code: 90011
- Dialing code: 091
- Patron saint: San Giuseppe
- Saint day: March 19
- Website: Official website

Bagheria (Italian pronunciation: [baɡeˈriːa]; Sicilian: Baarìa [baːˈɾiːa]) is the second largest city and comune in the Metropolitan City of Palermo in Sicily, located approximately 13 km (8,07 miles) to the east of Palermo's city centre.

The first residential areas date back to the 17th century, when the Sicilian nobles chose this territory to build their holiday estates. The multitude of noble residences in Baroque and Rococo style made the newly founded town of Bagheria known as "the city of villas".

During the 19th century the town welcomed numerous working and middle class families and expanded demographically. The autonomous municipality was established in 1820, when Bagheria had completed its evolution from a holiday resort to a small suburban town. In 1852 there were 9,832 inhabitants, 3,664 more than those recorded in 1831. Today the town has over 53,000 inhabitants.

== Etymology ==
According to some sources, the name Bagheria (by way of old Sicilian Baarìa) originates from the Phoenician term Bayharia meaning "land that descends toward the sea."

== History ==
Since its founding, the town has gone by the names of Bayharia, Baharia, and Baarìa. In 1658 Giuseppe Branciforti, Prince of Butera and former Viceroy of Sicily, built a large villa and established the region as the preferred location for the vacation homes of Palermo's elites. Villas like the fortified Villa San Marco (designed by Andrea Cirrincione) with angled bastions and a drawbridge soon followed. The area experienced a boom in villa building roughly coinciding with the period of Savoyard (1713–21) and Habsburg (1721–30) rule and continuing for several decades thereafter. The two most striking baroque residences, Villa Valguarnera and Villa Palagonia were designed by the architect Tommaso Napoli in 1712 and 1715 respectively. Both were completed only decades later. Napoli had been influenced by his experiences in Rome and Vienna and this is reflected in his designs. Other architects and clients like Giuseppe Mariani and the Prince of Aragona also looked to prints of Roman exemplars when constructing the Villa Aragona (now Cutò) in 1714.

By 1763, tastes were changing. The Villa Villarosa, supervised by the young G. V. Marvuglia, was directly modeled on more neoclassical plans published by Jean-François de Neufforge in 1760. In 1769, one of the descendants of the original Prince of Butera redesigned his estate into a well-planned town, allowing him to collect rents from the inhabitants. Bagheria was a preferred stopping point for Europeans pursuing the Grand Tour in Sicily including Patrick Brydone, Johann Wolfgang von Goethe, John Soane, Karl Friedrich Schinkel and many others.

In the 20th and 21st centuries, the Baroque and Neoclassical architecture of Bagheria was largely obscured by unregulated building.

== Main sights ==
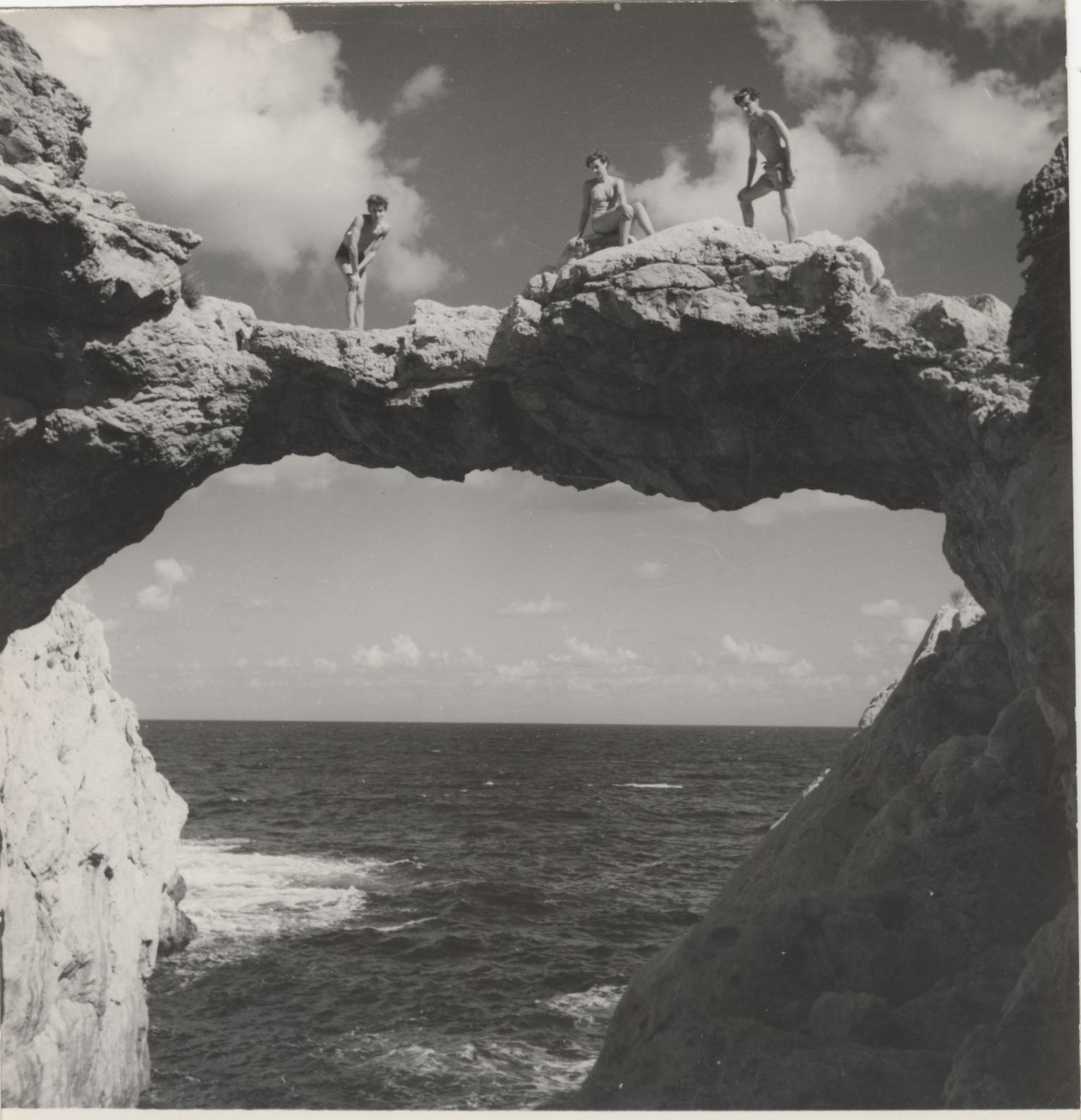
Aspra (Bagheria) natural arch

- Villa Palagonia, renowned for its complex external staircase, curved façades, and marble. Designed by Tommaso Maria Napoli, it is today open to the public.
- Other notable building include Villa Butera, Villa Valguarnera, Villa Trabia, Villa Spedalotto, Villa San Cataldo, Villa Villarosa, Villa San Marco, Villa Filangeri, Villa Sant'Isidoro, Villa Ramacca, Villa Serradifalco, Villa Larderia, Villa Campofranco.
- The Museum of the painter Renato Guttuso with a permanent exhibition of his work is placed in Villa Cattolica. A famous collection of old sicilian toys, il Museo del Giocattolo di Pietro Piraino, is placed in Villa Cuto.

== Religion ==
Although the official feast day of Saint Joseph, the town's patron saint, is March 19, it is celebrated in Bagheria the first Sunday of August; religious celebrations are held throughout the week leading up to Sunday, when more solemn ceremonies are initiated; the following Monday evening festivities conclude with a fireworks display.

== Notable people ==
- Joe Aiello (1890-1930), Italian-American gangster
- Giuseppe Bagnera (1865-1927), mathematician
- Ignazio Buttitta (1899-1997), poet
- Diego D'Amico (1893-1947), politician
- Michelangelo Galioto (1897-1997), politician
- Margherita Gargano (1952), athlete
- Giuseppe Guttadauro (1948), surgeon and organized crime leader
- Aldo Renato Guttuso (1911-1987), painter and politician
- Anna Incerti (1980), athlete
- Dacia Maraini (1936), writer
- Silvia Paternò di Spedalotto (1953), noblewoman
- Ferdinando Scianna (1943), photographer
- Giuseppe Tornatore (1956), director

== In popular culture ==
Villa Palagonia appears in the 1962 film Mafioso, directed by Alberto Lattuada.

Italian director Giuseppe Tornatore portrayed his love for Bagheria in the multiple award-winning film Cinema Paradiso (Nuovo Cinema Paradiso) in 1989, and again in the 2009 film Baarìa, featuring the history of the town from the 1930s to the 1980s through the life of a local family.

Bagheria is depicted in the 1990 film The Godfather Part III directed by Francis Ford Coppola.

Villa Arezzo Spedalotto was used as a set for the 1991 film Johnny Stecchino, directed by Roberto Benigni.

The town is the setting of Dacia Maraini's eponymous autobiographical work.
