= Fosco Maraini =

Italian photographer, anthropologist, and mountaineer (1912–2004)

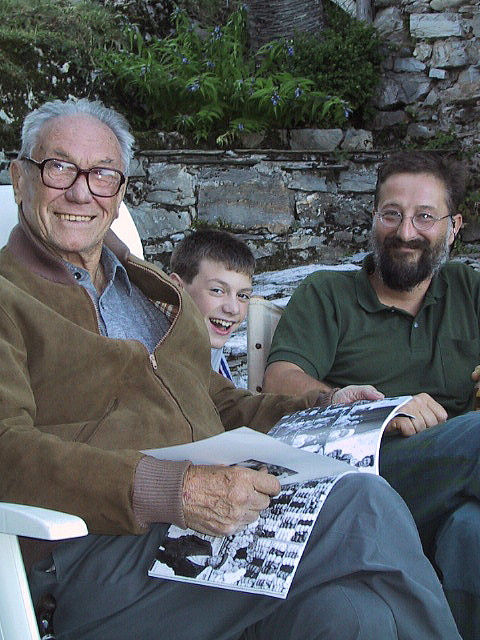
- Fosco Maraini (on the left)
- Born: 15 November 1912; Florence, Italy
- Died: 8 June 2004 (aged 91); Florence, Italy
- Known for: Metasemantic poetry
- Spouses: Topazia Alliata (m. 1935; div. 1970); Mieko Namiki (m. 1970)
- Children: 3, including Dacia Maraini
- Scientific career
- Fields: Ethnology of Tibet and Japan

Fosco Maraini (Italian: [ˈfosko maraˈiːni, ˈfɔs-]; 15 November 1912 – 8 June 2004) was an Italian photographer, anthropologist, ethnologist, writer, mountaineer and academic.

== Biography ==
Fosco was born in Florence to the Italian sculptor Antonio Maraini (1886–1963) and Cornelia Edith "Yoï" Crosse, known as Yoï Crosse-Pawlowska (1877–1944), a model and writer of English and Polish descent who was born in Tállya, Hungary. As a photographer, Fosco Maraini is perhaps best known for his work in Tibet and Japan. The visual record Maraini captured in images of Tibet and on the Ainu people of Hokkaidō has gained significance as historical documentation of two disappearing cultures. His work was recognized with a 2002 award from the Photographic Society of Japan, citing his fine-art photos—and especially his impressions of Hokkaido's Ainu. The society acknowledged his efforts to strengthen ties between Japan and Italy over 60 years. Maraini photographed extensively in the Karakoram and Hindu Kush mountain ranges of Central Asia, in Southeast Asia and in the south of his native Italy.

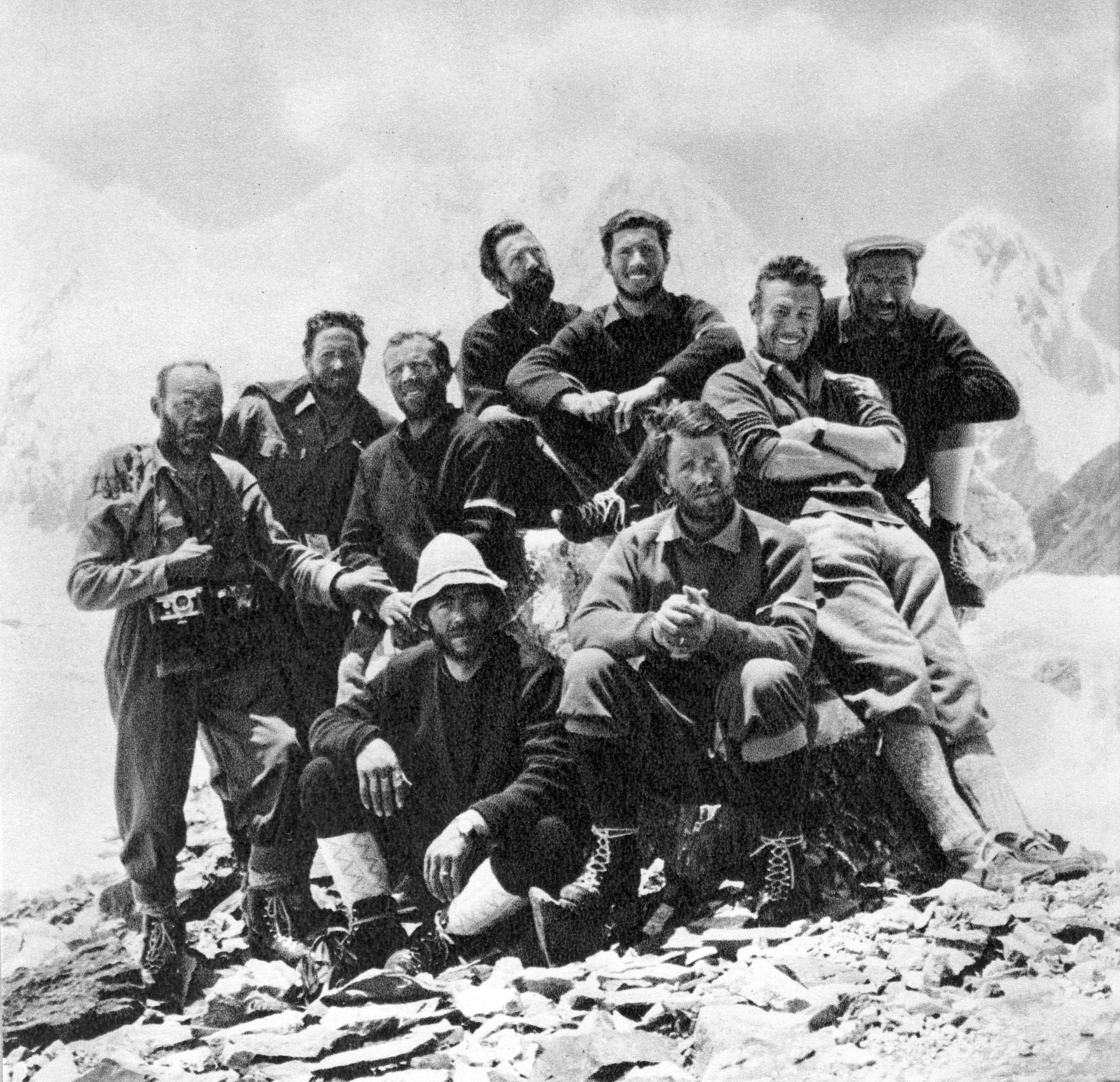
Members of the Italian Gasherbrum IV expedition 1958, Maraini is standing, second from right.

As an anthropologist and ethnographer, he is known for his published observations and accounts of his travels with Tibetologist Giuseppe Tucci during two expeditions to Tibet, first in 1937 and again in 1948.

As a mountaineer, he is perhaps best known for the 1959 ascent of Saraghrar and for his published accounts of this and other Himalayan climbs. As a climber in the Himalayas, he was moved to describe it as "the greatest museum of shape and form on earth."

From 1938 to 1943, Maraini's academic career progressed in Japan, teaching first in Hokkaido (1938–1941) and then in Kyoto (1941–1943); but what he himself observed and learned during those years may be more important than what he may have taught. Dacia, his eldest daughter, would decades later recall that "the first trip I took was on the sea from Brindisi to Kobe." Two of his three daughters were born in Japan: Yuki (registered as Luisa in Italy) was born in Sapporo in 1939, Antonella (Toni) in Tokyo in 1941. After the Italians signed an armistice with the allies in World War II, the Japanese authorities asked Maraini and his wife Topazia Alliata to sign an act of allegiance to Mussolini's puppet Republic of Salò. They were both asked separately and separately they refused, and were interned with their three daughters of six, four and two years old in a concentration camp at Nagoya for two years. Those memories of 1943 through 1946 evolved into some chapters of the book "Meeting with Japan" by Fosco Maraini. Dacia Maraini's collection of poetry drawn from those difficult years, Mangiami pure, was published in 1978.

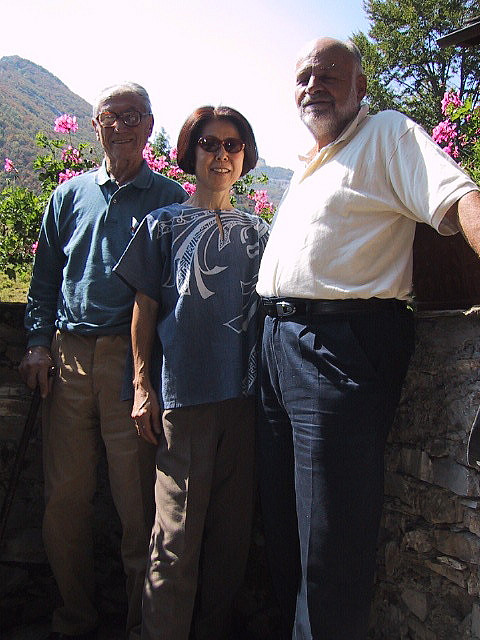
Fosco Maraini, his wife Mieko Namiki and Kurt Diemberger.

The Maraini family retreated to Italy after the Allies occupied Japan. This period became the core of another book by Dacia Maraini who remembers that they left Asia "without either money or possessions, stripped bare, with nothing on our backs except the clothes handed out by the American military." The years in Italy are described in the book, Bagheria, named after the Sicilian town not far from Palermo where the family lived.

In time, Maraini did return to his "adopted homeland" of Japan; and in 1955, this journey of rediscovery became the basis for his book, Meeting with Japan.

In an interview, one of his daughters explained that one of her earliest memories of her father speaking is when he claimed:

Remember that races don't exist, cultures exist.

The head of the Tuscany regional government publicly explained that Maraini had "honored Florence and the Tuscany by teaching us to be tolerant of other cultures."

Fosco Maraini was, with Giuliana Stramigioli among others, a founding member of the AISTUGIA – the Italian Association for the Japanese Studies.

The 1963 film Violated Paradise, directed by Marion Gering was based on Maraini's work L' Isola Delle Pescatrici (1960). A few images shot by Maraini's crew were used in the production.

== Selected works ==
Maraini has had numerous photographic exhibitions in Europe and Japan; and he wrote over twenty books, many of which have been translated into several languages.

=== Books ===
- Secret Tibet (1952)
- Ore Giapponesi (1959)
- G4-Karakorum (1959)
- Meeting with Japan (1960)
- L'Isola delle Pescatrici (1960). English version: The Island of the Fisherwomen (1962)
- Paropàmiso (1963). English version: Where Four Worlds Meet: Hindu Kush 1959 (1964)
- Tokyo (1976), Photography by Harald Sund; The Great Cities Time Life Books Amsterdam.
- Jerusalem: Rock of Ages (1969), Photography by Alfred Bernheim and Ricarda Schwerin; Translated by Judith Landry; New York: Harcourt, Brace and World, Inc.
- Patterns of Continuity (1971)
- Gnosi delle Fànfole (1994)
- Nuvolario (1995)
- Case, amori, universi (2000)

=== Articles ===
- "Tradition and Innovation in Japanese Films," Geographical Magazine. Oct. 1954: 294–305.

== Honors ==
- Photographic Society of Japan, International Award—2002.
- Japan Foundation Award—1986,
- Order of the Rising Sun, 3rd class—1982.
- International Society to Save Kyoto's Historic Environment, (ISSK) – First Honorary President.

== See also ==
- Saraghrar
- Marilyn Silverstone
