= Dacia Maraini =

Italian writer (born 1936)

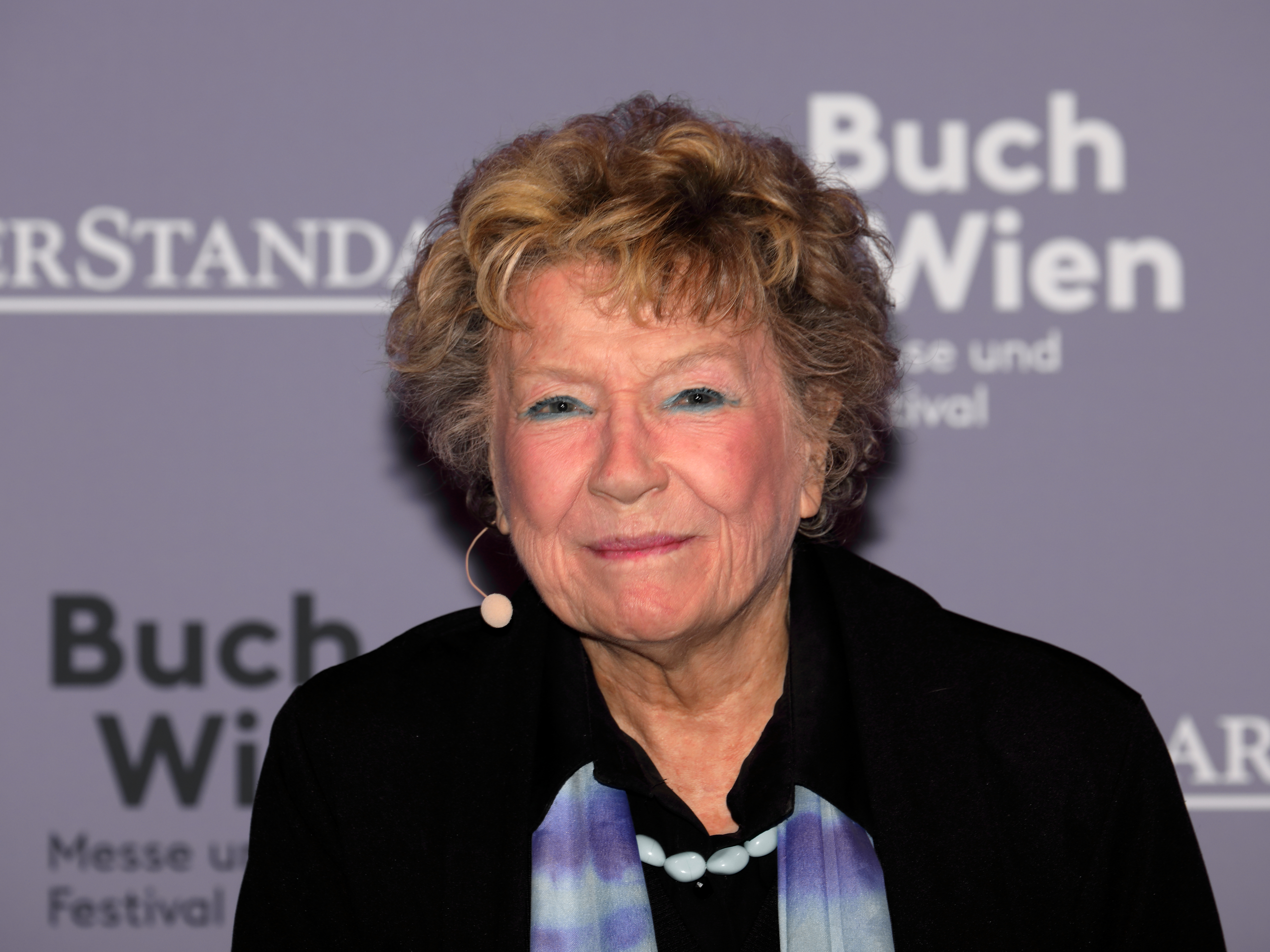
- Maraini in 2025
- Born: Dacia Maraini; November 13, 1936 (age 89); Fiesole, Florence, Kingdom of Italy
- Education: Istituto Statale della Ss. Annunziata, Florence
- Occupations: Novelist; playwright; poet; orator
- Partner: Alberto Moravia (1962–1983)
- Relatives: Topazia Alliata (mother); Fosco Maraini (father)
- Writing career
- Period: 1961–present
- Notable works: La vacanza (The Vacation); L'età del malessere (The Age of Malaise); Donna in guerra (Woman at War); Buio
- Notable awards: Formentor Prize; 1962 L'età del malessere Premio Fregene; 1985 Isolina; Premio Strega; 1999 Buio
- Literary movement: Anti-fascism; feminism; confessional writing

Dacia Maraini (Italian pronunciation: [ˈdaːtʃa maraˈiːni]; born November 13, 1936) is an Italian writer. Maraini's work focuses on women's issues, and she has written numerous plays and novels. She has won awards for her work, including the Formentor Prize for L'età del malessere (1963); the Fregene Prize for Isolina (1985); the Premio Campiello and Book of the Year Award for La lunga vita di Marianna Ucrìa (1990); and the Premio Strega for Buio (1999). In 2013, Irish Braschi's biographical documentary I Was Born Travelling told the story of her life, focusing in particular on her imprisonment in a concentration camp in Japan during World War II and the journeys she made around the world with her partner Alberto Moravia and close friends Pier Paolo Pasolini and Maria Callas.

== Life and career ==
=== Early life ===
Maraini was born in Fiesole, Tuscany. She is the daughter of Sicilian princess Topazia Alliata di Salaparuta, an artist and art dealer, and Fosco Maraini, a Florentine ethnologist and mountaineer of mixed Ticinese, English and Polish background who wrote in particular on Tibet and Japan. When she was a child, her family moved to Japan in 1938 to escape Fascism. They were interned in a Japanese concentration camp in Nagoya from 1943 to 1946 for refusing to recognize Mussolini's Republic of Salò, allied with the Empire of Japan. After the war, the family returned to Italy and lived in Sicily with her mother's family in the town of Bagheria, province of Palermo.

Not long after, her parents separated and her father moved to Rome where, some years later, at the age of eighteen, Maraini joined him. Maraini's work focuses on women's issues, and she has written numerous plays and novels. She was educated at Istituto Statale della Ss. Annunziata, a prestigious and privileged boarding school in Florence. Much of Maraini's writing was affected by her parents and the roles they played in her life. Maraini grew up with an adventurous father and a mother who was always burdened and, in addition to this, read books in which only men would go on quests and journeys. She states that she "became upset by the fact that no great journey could be taken by a woman..."

She married Lucio Pozzi, a Milanese painter, but they separated after four years. She then became Alberto Moravia's companion, living with him from 1962 until 1983.

=== Career ===
In 1966, Maraini, Moravia and Enzo Siciliano founded the del Porcospino ("Porcupine") theatrical company which had as its mission the production of new Italian plays. They included her own La famiglia normale, Moravia's L'intervista, Siciliano's Tazza, and works by Carlo Emilio Gadda, Goffredo Parise, J. Rodolfo Wilcock and Tornabuoni. In 1971 she signed the Open letter to L'Espresso on the Pinelli case against the police officer Luigi Calabresi. In 1973, she helped to found the Teatro della Maddalena which was run by women only.

Maraini directed L'amore coniugale from 1969 to 1973, her only feature film. In 1976 Maraini directed the films Mio padre amore mio ("My father my love"), Aborto: parlano le donne ("Abortion: women speak out"), Le ragazze di Capoverde ("The young women of Capoverde") and Ritratti di donne africane ("Portraits of African Women"), a three-part series.

Maraini's writing in film includes the screenplay for Love Problems (1968), the screenplay for Kill the Fatted Calf and Roast It (1970), a script collaboration for Arabian Nights (1974), the documentary Aborto: Parlano le donne (1976), the screenplay for the TV movie documentary Abrami in Africa (1976), the TV series documentary Ritratti di donne africane (1977), the screenplay for The Story of Piera (1983), and the screenplay for La bocca (1990).

Maraini has begun acting, appearing in Io sono nata viaggiando (2013) and narrating Caro Paolo (2013). She also appeared as herself in The Many Women of Fassbinder (1997), Midnight Journal (1990), Sophia: Ieri, oggi, domani (2007), Kulturzeit (2012), and Tutte le storie di Piera (2013).

=== Later life ===
Maraini continues to produce works. Her most recent novel, Vita mia: Giappone, 1943. Memorie di una bambina italiana in un campo di prigionia, was published in 2023.

== Relationship with Italy ==
In an interview with author Monica Seger, Dacia Maraini stated that, despite her attachment to Italy and its culture, she does not feel like a cultural ambassador. Very often, she tries to analyze her country critically, since being able to view the world through critical eyes is one of an intellectual's prime duties. Her criticism is based on the expectations she has of her country; the more intellectuals try to be critical of their country, the more they want to see it function well. As an intellectual, Maraini tries "to illuminate, to persuade other people of what could be changed in a country that has possibility, a great country, a country of great people that have done great things" because she wants "to persuade Italians that [they] can do better".

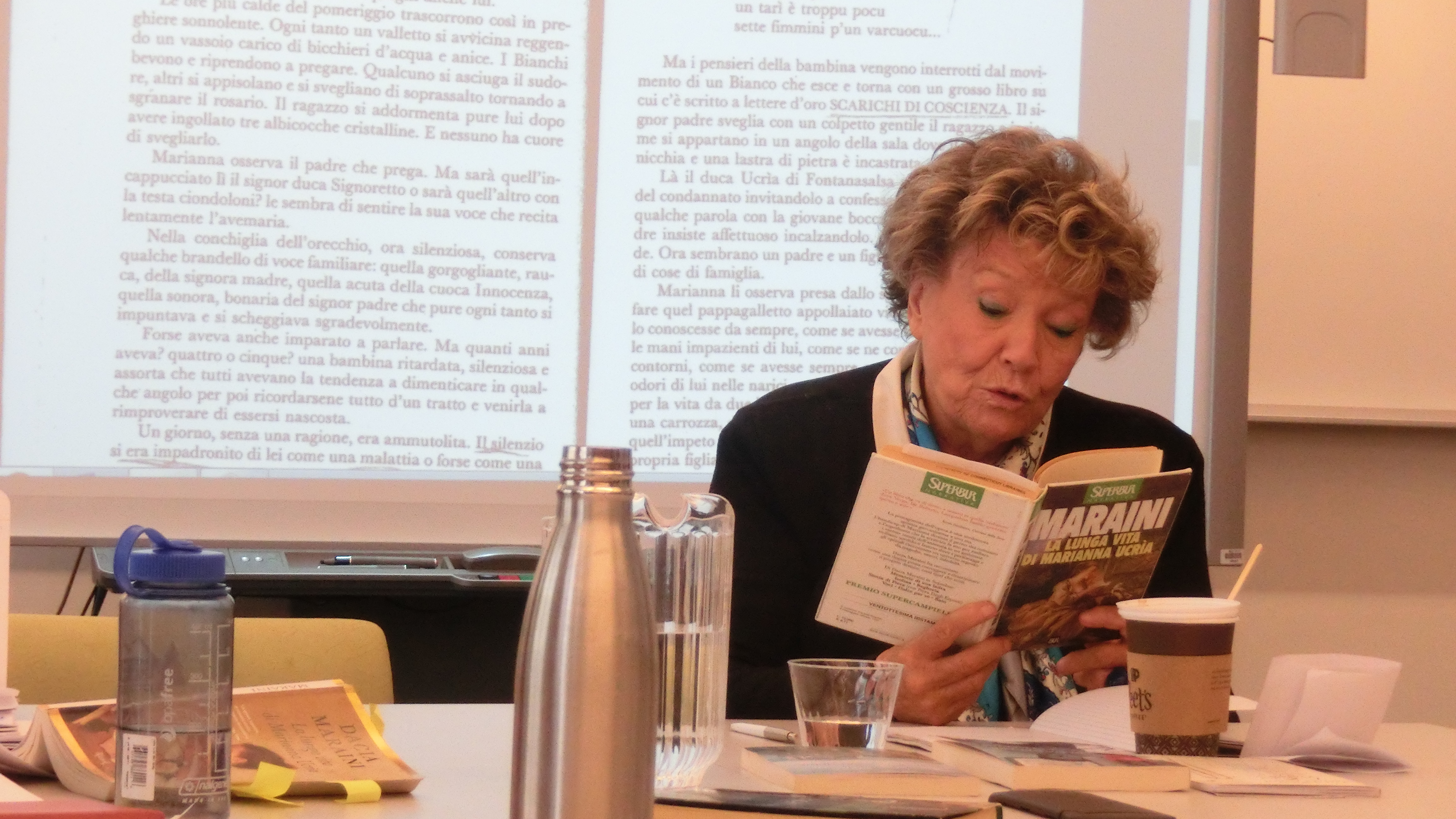
Dacia Maraini's reading at the University of Connecticut, on March 11, 2019. Maraini travelled extensively in New England, lecturing at local Colleges and Universities.

== Writing and travelling ==
Furthermore, the interview focuses on Maraini's meaning of being a writer and a critic. For instance, her book, La Seduzione dell'altrove, is very significant because it outlines her feelings towards her work. According to her, writing and travelling are both forms of illness and therapy. They are an illness because they are stressful and tiring but a therapy because they give her an opportunity to "look from afar and perhaps see things better".

== Relationship between the theatre and public ==
When discussing the importance of the relationship between her books and plays with the public, according to Maraini, the relationship with the public is more important in the theatre because, differently from books, plays deal with the collective and social aspects. While a novel is a more personal relationship with a single reader, plays focus on the live public that can be participating or not. Also, differently, it is easier to feel whether the public is participating or not compared to a book.

== Work ==
Bagheria (1993) is Maraini's only autobiographical work to date. Maraini's works have a general pattern to which they abide; a series of short stories and novels that reflect her "prefeminist stage" are characterized by a sense of alienation, total disorientation, and the need for self-assentation through sexuality. Maraini's "transitional stage," best characterized by her novel, A memoria, demonstrates a tone shifting from inaction to an active search for innovative expression. Maraini's subsequent and more progressive novels, such as Donna in guerra (Woman at War), in which her female characters break free of traditional gender roles and explore their sexuality and social activism, reflect Maraini's involvement in the feminist movement during the late sixties and early seventies.

=== Themes ===
Many reoccurring themes evident in Maraini's work are: personal freedom for women, exposing the use and abuse of power and its effects on women, women breaking free of traditional gender roles to explore their sexuality and social activism, the silencing of women in society and their appearance in the fashion-system, the seclusion and isolation of women as a result of women seeking their independence and freedom, motherhood as a form of confinement for women, and thus abortion as their only option, violence against and rape of women, women breaking free from being seen as sex objects, and characters' experience with homosexuality, pedophilia, and group sex.

== Maraini and feminism ==
Although Maraini states she is a feminist only in the fact that she is always on the side of women, much of Maraini's work has been classified as feminist. The nature of Maraini's work evolves in line with women's changing position in Italian society and exposes the use and abuse of power and its effects on women. Maraini's progressive works helped change the general impression that women should solely fulfil domestic roles.

Dacia Maraini underwent "a process of evolution in ideology" divided into two forms; one that outlines the individual's close relationships with reality and the other based on motivation to further the cause of women's rights. According to writers such as Pallotta, a series of short stories and novels reflected Maraini's prefeminist stage. The literary works include La vacanza (The Vacation, 1962), L'età del malessere (1963). Her pre-feminist stage is characterized by a sense of alienation, total disorientation and the need for self-assentation through sexuality. Pallotta states "social and psychological disorientation [is] rooted in a passive consciousness that refuses to come to terms with reality". The transitional stage is characterized by the need to search for new modes of literary expression. These stages led to a feminist viewpoint that reflects a feminist awareness. Feminist novels include A memoria and Donna in Guerra. These novels are very significant and are a representation of the Italian Feminist Movement of 1968. The importance of these two works is the research of the protagonists' "total unity." This total unity can be considered part of the constituent stage of her literary expression of feminism.

== Awards and honours ==
Maraini has garnered many awards for her work, including the International Formentor Prize (1963) for L'età del malessere; the Premio Fregene (1985), for Isolina; the Premio Campiello (1990) for "La lunga vita di Marianna Ucria"; and the Agrigento, Brancanti Zafferana, & Citta di Salerno (1997) and the Premio Strega (1999) for Buio. She also won the Premio Napoli & Sibilla Aleramo prize (1994) for "Voci"; the Premio Mediterraneo and the Premio Citta di Penne for "Viaggiando con passo di volpe"; the Sitges International Prize in Spain; and the Premio Candcni, the Italian Premio Riccione; and she was both a finalist for the Man Booker International Prize and a nominee for the Nobel Prize in Literature (2012).

== List of works ==
=== Italian original release ===
- La vacanza (1963)
- L'età del malessere (1963, winner of Formentor Prize; also published as The Age of Malaise–)
- "Il Manifesto" (1972)
- Memorie di una ladra (1973)
- Short Play (1973, in Wicked Women Revue; presented by Westbeth Playwrights Feminist Collective, USA)
- Donne mie (1974, poetry)
- Mio marito (1974, 17 short stories)
- Donna in guerra (1975)
- Maria Stuarda (1975, theater)
- Dialogo di una prostituta col suo cliente (1978, theater)
- Mangiami pure (1978, poetry)
- Stravaganza (1978)
- Isolina (1985, winner of Premio Fregene)
- La lunga vita di Marianna Ucrìa (1990, awarded Premio Campiello)
- Viaggiando con passo di volpe: Poesie, 1983–1991 (1991, winner of Mediterraneo Prize and Città delle penne)
- Veronica, meretrice e scrittora (1991, theater)
- Bagheria (1993)
- Voci (1994)
- Dolce per sé (1997)
- Se amando troppo (1998)
- Buio (1999, 12 crime stories, winner of Premio Strega)
- Fare teatro (1966–2000) (2000, collection of plays)
- Veronica, meretrice e scrittora; La terza moglie di Mayer; Camille (2001, 3 plays)
- Colomba (2004)
- Il treno dell'ultima notte (2008)
- " La ragazza di via Maqueda" (2009)
- La grande festa (2011)
- L'amore rubato (2012 – ISBN 9788817060813)
- Chiara d'Assisi: Elogio della disobbedienza (2013)
- La bambina e il sognatore (2015)
- La mia vita, le mie battaglie (2015)
- Onda Marina e il Drago Spento (2019; illustrations by Simone Angelini – ISBN 9788860045065)
- Sguardo a Oriente (2022 – ISBN 9788860431752)
- Vita mia (2023 – ISBN 9788817140973)

=== In translation to English ===
- —— (1963) [1963]. The Age of Discontent [L'età del malessere]. Translated by Frances Frenaye.
- —— (1966) [1963]. The Holiday: A Novel [La vacanza]. Translated by Stuart Hood.
- —— (1972) [1972]. Manifesto [Il Manifesto]. Translated by Sandy MacDonald. (in Aphra: The Feminist Literary Magazine, 1972–73)
- —— (1973) [1973]. Memoirs of a Female Thief [Memorie di una ladra]. Translated by Nina Rootes.
- —— (1978) [1978]. Dialogue Between a Prostitute and Her Client [Dialogo di una prostituta col suo cliente]. Translated from the Italian.
- —— (1984) [1975]. Woman at War [Donna in guerra]. Translated by Maria Benedetti and Elspeth Spottiswood.
- —— (1987) [1978]. Devour Me Too [Mangiami pure]. Translated by Genni Donati Gunn. Guernica. ISBN 9780919349896.
- —— (1992) [1990]. The Silent Duchess [La lunga vita di Marianna Ucrìa]. Translated by Dick Kitto and Elspeth Spottiswood. ISBN 9781550820539.
- —— (1993) [1985]. Isolina [Isolina]. Translated by Siân Williams. P. Owen. ISBN 9780720608977.
- —— (1994) [1993]. Bagheria [Bagheria]. Translated by Dick Kitto and Elspeth Spottiswood. ISBN 9780720609264.
- —— (1994) [1992]. "Veronica Franco, Courtesan and Poet" in Plays by Mediterranean Women. Translated by Sian Williams and Marion Baraitser.
- —— (1997) [1994]. Voices [Voci]. Translated by Dick Kitto and Elspeth Spottiswood.
- —— (2002) [1999]. Darkness: Fiction [Buio]. Translated by Martha King.
- —— (2004) [1974]. My Husband [Mio marito]. Translated by Vera F. Golini.
- —— (2010) [2008]. Train to Budapest [Il treno dell'ultima notte]. Translated by Silvester Mazzarella. Arcadia. ISBN 9781906413576.

=== Featured in ===
- (1994)Plays by Mediterranean Women
