= Aspra, Sicily =

Aspra
- Comune
- Città di Bagheria
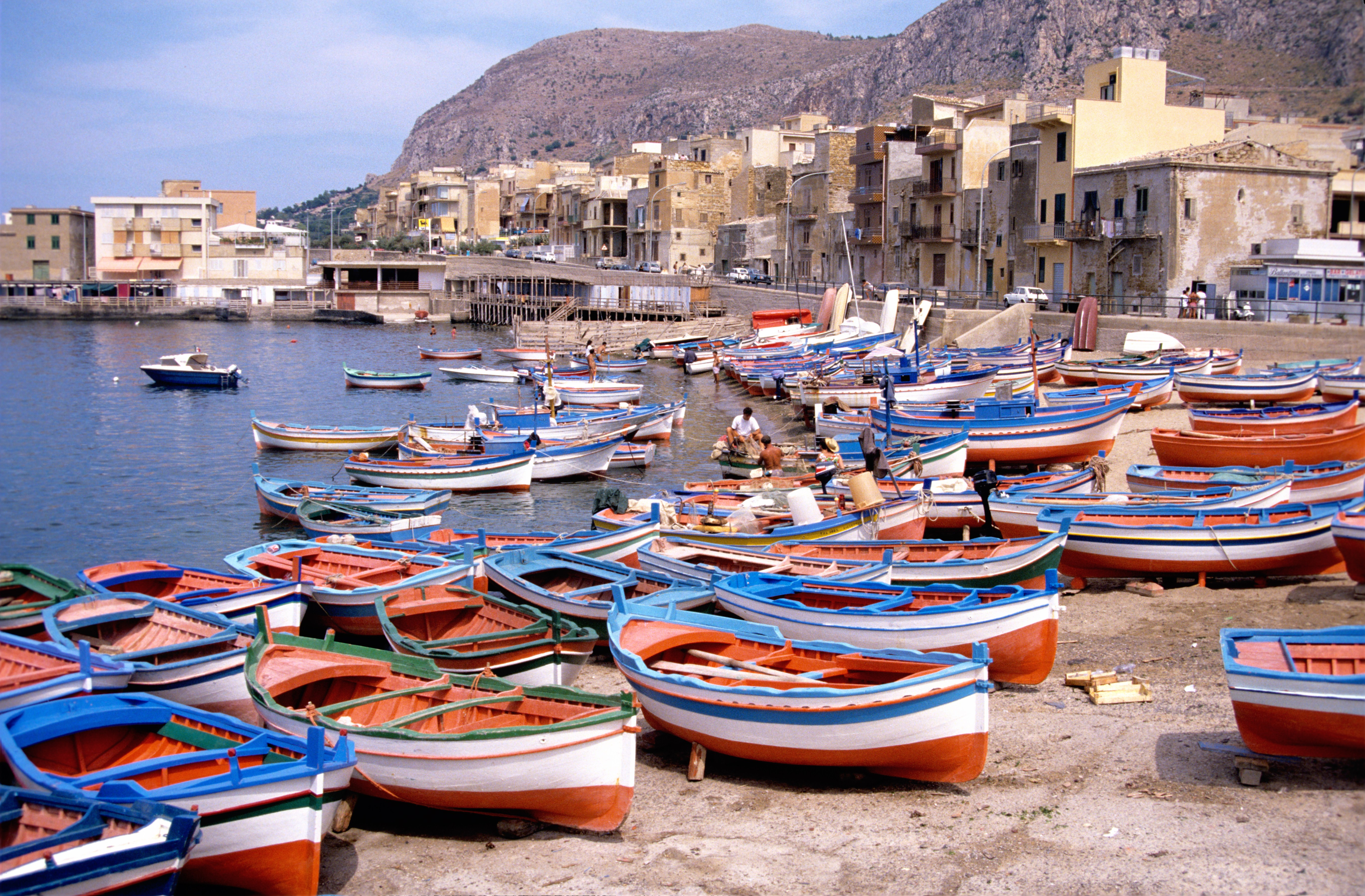
- Fishing boats in Aspra

- Coat of arms

- Location of Aspra in Italy Aspra (Sicily)
- Coordinates: 38°06′13″N 13°29′56″E
- Country: Italy
- Region: Sicily
- Province: Palermo (PA)
- Frazioni: Aspra

Government
  - Mayor: Vincenzo Giuseppe Lo Meo
- Elevation: 0–10 m (0–33 ft)
- Demonym: Aspresi (Asparuoti in Sicilian)
- Time zone: UTC+1 (CET)
  - Summer (DST): UTC+2 (CEST)
- Postal code: 90011
- Dialing code: 091
- Patron saint: Maria S. Addolorata
- Saint day: September 14
- Website: web.archive.org/web/20121209012646/http://www.ilgiornalediaspra.net:80/

Aspra (Aspira in Sicilian) is a town in the comune of Bagheria in the Province of Palermo in Sicily, Italy.

== History ==
The first traces of the town are thought to belong to the period of Arabic domination in Sicily, as it is suspected that the name comes from the Arabic حجر («stone»). Aspra was in fact, for generations, used to cave out blocks of calcarenite (a light stone of medium strength and easy to work in the big open sky caves locally called "pirriere"). Aspra was part of the land of the nobility of Marquis of Sant'Isidoro, of which now remain a villa and the land of the Church of Aspra (originally his own private chapel but later donated to the town. The other portion is partially used as municipal offices).

Notable are the alfrescos by Renato Guttuso in the church, the seaside (lungomare), and "u rittufilu" (a straight road extending from the Corso Butera of Bagheria). Fishing is the primary economic activity of the town, with local anchovies being exported worldwide.

== Geographical location ==
The territory of Aspra goes from the Montagna d'Aspra, which is the name of the mountain near the town with the tops of Monte Irice (284 m), Cozzo San Pietro (345 m) and Cozzo Tondo. The mountain extends in a promontory (Capo Mongerbino). Continuing towards Esto est, passing Mongerbino, it is possible to reach Porticello (locality of the town Santa Flavia). West Aspra ends following the profile of the river Eleuterio.
