= Giovanni Macchia =

Italian writer (1912–2001)

- Born: 14 November 1912; Trani, Italy
- Died: 30 September 2001 (aged 88); Rome, Italy
- Occupation: Writer

Giovanni Macchia (14 November 1912 – 30 September 2001) was an Italian literary critic and essayist.

Born in Trani, the son of a magistrate, Macchia moved with his family to Rome in 1923, where, in 1934, he graduated in letters and philosophy with a thesis on Charles Baudelaire as a critic, a topic which was later one of his main subject of studies. He attended master classes at the Collège de France and at La Sorbonne.

Starting from 1938, he was a lecturer of French letters and literature at the University of Pisa, at the University of Catania and at La Sapienza in Rome, where he also founded and directed the Institute of history of the theatre and performing arts.

His essay about Marcel Proust, L'angelo della notte, got him a Bagutta Prize in 1979. Other main subjects of his analysis include the European theatre, the French moralists, and the Age of Enlightenment.

A member of the Accademia dei Lincei since 1962, he was awarded the Legion of Honor in 1990. In 1992, he received a Balzan Prize.
