= Lucio Pozzi =

Italian-born, American artist (born 1935)

Lucio Pozzi (born 1935 in Milan) is an Italian-born, American artist currently based in Hudson, New York, and Valeggio sul Mincio, Verona, Italy. He studied architecture in Rome before moving to New York City in 1962.

Pozzi is a painter whose painterly concerns extend to environmental art and actions. He teaches, writes, and lectures. His work is in the collections of the New Mexico Museum of Art, P.S. 1 Contemporary Art Center; the Museum of Modern Art; the Museum of Contemporary Art, Chicago; the Art Gallery of Ontario; the New York Public Library; the Detroit Institute of Arts; Giuseppe Panza; the Fogg Art Museum; the Herbert and Dorothy Vogel Collection and the Whitney Museum of American Art.

Pozzi's awards include the National Endowment for the Arts. He is also a member of American Abstract Artists.
