= Michelangelo Antonioni filmography =

Filmography of Italian film director Michelangelo Antonioni

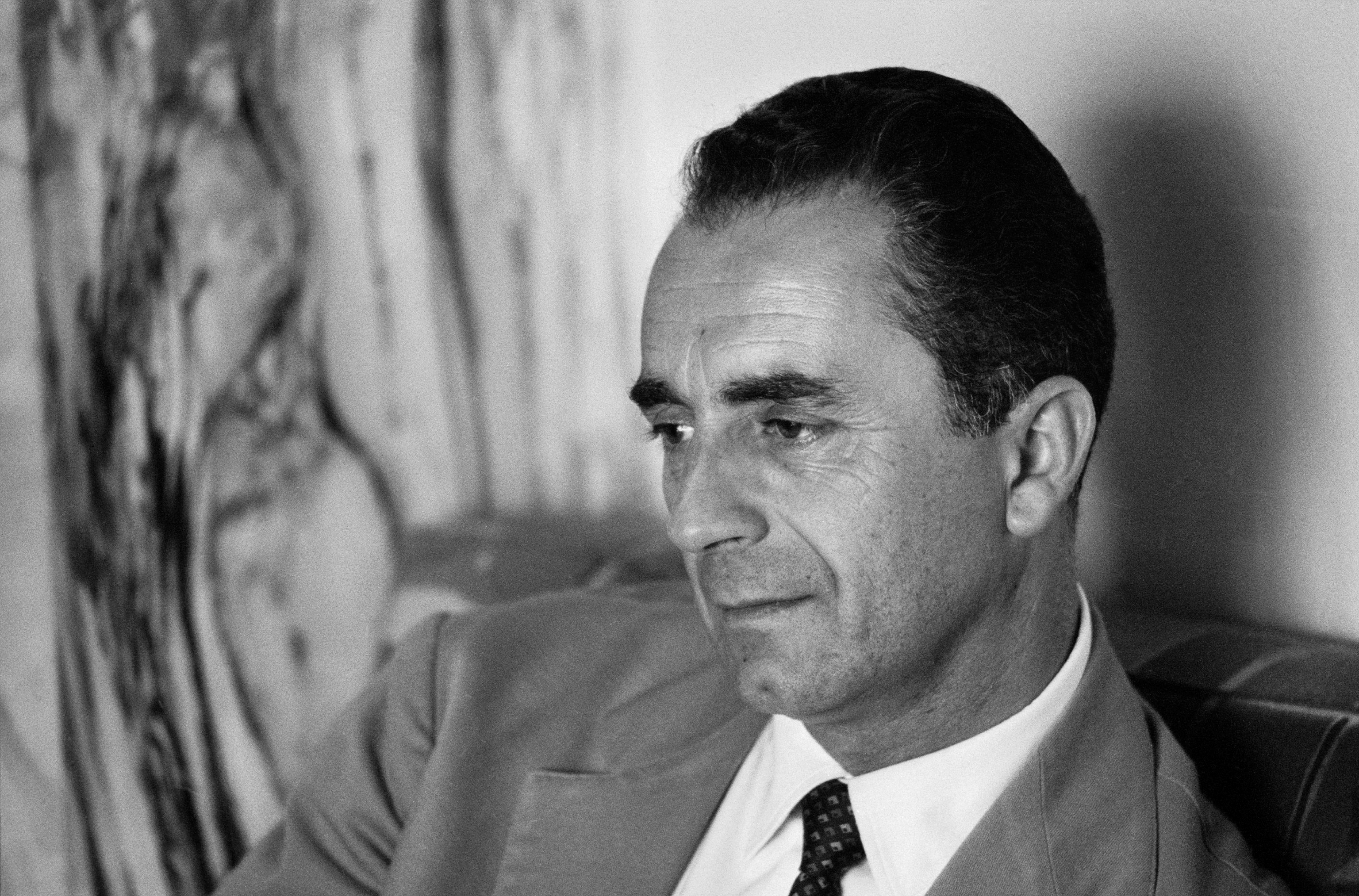
Antonioni in 1961

Michelangelo Antonioni (1912–2007) was an Italian film director, screenwriter, and editor, who wrote and directed 19 feature films and over 20 short films. Regarded as among the defining figures of slow cinema, his work is characterized by their visual composition, minimalist narrative style, and recurring themes of alienation, modernity, and human relationships; his films are widely recognized for their influence on the development of international art cinema. He began his career as a film journalist for the Ferrara newspaper Il Corriere Padano after graduating from the University of Bologna in 1935. In 1940, Antonioni moved to Rome, where he briefly attended the Centro Sperimentale di Cinematografia and worked as a screenwriter and assistant director while contributing criticism to the magazine Cinema, edited by Vittorio Mussolini. In 1942, Antonioni co-wrote A Pilot Returns with Roberto Rossellini and served as assistant director on Enrico Fulchignoni's I due Foscari. The following year, he traveled to France to assist Marcel Carné on Les visiteurs du soir and began work on his directorial debut with Gente del Po (1947), the first of several Italian neorealist short documentaries, which, although filmed in 1943, was not released until 1947.

In 1948, Antonioni continued directing documentary shorts, including N.U. (Nettezza urbana), Sette canne, un vestito (Seven Reeds, One Suit), Superstizione (Superstitions), and Roma-Montevideo, works that reflected the influence of Italian neorealism, depicting the moral and economic conditions of post-World War II Italy. The following year, Antonioni wrote and directed the 1949 short documentary film L'amorosa menzogna (Lies of Love) was screened at the 1949 Cannes Film Festival. In 1950, Antonioni made his feature-length directorial debut with Cronaca di un amore (Story of a Love Affair), which won the Nastro d'Argento for Best Score for Giovanni Fusco the following year, while Antonioni received a Special Nastro d'Argento for its "human and stylistic values." Antonioni's next feature was the I vinti (The Vanqueshed, 1953) a triptych of stories about juvenile delinquency set in France, Italy, and England. He continued exploring themes of social alienation in a series of feature films, including La signora senza camelie (The Lady Without Camellias, 1953), about a young film star's rise and fall; and Le amiche (The Girlfriends, 1955), which follows the lives of middle-class women in Turin. Il grido (The Outcry, 1957) marked a return to working-class subjects, depicting a factory worker and his daughter.

With Le amiche, Antonioni began to develop a more experimental narrative style that used fragmented storytelling, extended takes, and an emphasis on the psychological states of his characters. He continued this style with L'avventura (1960), which became his first international success despite a mixed reception at the 1960 Cannes Film Festival, where it won the Jury Prize. The film marked the beginning of Antonioni's "alienation trilogy," which was followed by La notte (1961), which won the Golden Bear at the Berlin International Film Festival, and L'eclisse (1962). His first color feature, Il deserto rosso (Red Desert, 1964), continued these themes and is sometimes regarded as an extension of the trilogy. All four films starred Monica Vitti, who was Antonioni's partner during this period.

Antonioni later signed a three-film agreement with producer Carlo Ponti that granted him artistic freedom to make English-language films. The first, Blowup (1966), became an international critical and commercial success, winning the Palme d'Or at the 1967 Cannes Film Festival. It was followed by Zabriskie Point (1970), set against the backdrop of the American counterculture, and The Passenger (1975), starring Jack Nicholson and Maria Schneider. In 1972, Antonioni directed the documentary Chung Kuo, Cina, followed by the experimental color film Il mistero di Oberwald (The Mystery of Oberwald, 1980) and Identificazione di una donna (Identification of a Woman, 1982). After suffering a stroke in 1985 that left him partially paralyzed, he returned to filmmaking with Beyond the Clouds (1995), co-directed with Wim Wenders, and concluded his career with Il filo pericoloso delle cose (The Dangerous Thread of Things, 2004), a segment of the anthology film Eros. In 1994, he received an Honorary Academy Award in recognition of his contributions to cinema.

== Feature films ==
Feature films
Year	English title	Original title	Director	Writer	Editor	Notes	Ref(s)
1942	A Pilot Returns	Un pilota ritorna	No	Yes	No	With Ugo Betti, Gherardo Gherardi, Rosario Leone, Margherita Maglione, Massimo Mida, Vittorio Mussolini, and Roberto Rossellini; made with the co-operation of the Italian Air Force.	
1942	The Two Foscari	I due Foscari	No	Yes	No	With Gaetano Campanile-Mancini, Mino Doletti, and Enrico Fulchignoni; based on Lord Byron's 1821 play of the same name.	
1942	The Devil's Envoys	Les visiteurs du soir	Assistant	No	No	Uncredited	
1947	Tragic Hunt	Caccia tragica	No	Yes	No	Co-written with Giuseppe De Santis, Corrado Alvaro, Umberto Barbaro, Carlo Lizzani, Gianni Puccini, and Cesare Zavattini.	
1950	Story of a Love Affair	Cronaca di un amore	Yes	Yes	Uncredited	Co-written with Daniele D'Anza, Silvio Giovannetti, Francesco Maselli, Piero Tellini; story inspired by the James M. Cain novel The Postman Always Rings Twice (1934); Antonioni's feature-length directorial debut.	
1952	The White Sheik	Lo sceicco bianco	No	Story	No	With Frederico Fellini and Tullio Pinelli.	
1953	The Vanquished	I Vinti	Yes	Yes	No	Co-written with Giorgio Bassani, Suso Cecchi d'Amico, Diego Fabbri, Roger Nimier, and Turi Vasile; anthology film of three separate stories in three different countries.	
1953	The Lady Without Camelias	La signora senza camelie	Yes	Yes	No	Co-written with Suso Cecchi d'Amico, Francesco Maselli, and Pier Maria Pasinetti.	
1953	Love in the City	L'amore in città	Yes	Uncredited	No	composed of six segments, each with its own director, including Antonioni Carlo Lizzani, Dino Risi, Federico Fellini, Francesco Maselli and Cesare Zavattini, and Alberto Lattuada.	
1955	The Girl Friends	Le Amiche	Yes	Yes	No	Co-written with Suso Cecchi d'Amico and Alba de Céspedes; based on Cesare Pavese's 1949 novella Tra donne sole (lit. "Among women only" or "Among single women").	
1957	The Cry	Il Grido	Yes	Yes	No	Co-written with Elio Bartolini and Ennio De Concini.	
1958	Tempest	La tempesta	Assistant	No	No	Also second unit directir	
1959	Sheba and the Gladiator	Nel segno di Roma	Uncredited	No	No	After director Guido Brignone fell ill during the production, Antonioni and Riccardo Freda were brought in to complete the film during the final days of shooting.	
1960	The Adventure	L'Avventura	Yes	Yes	No	Co-written with Elio Bartolini and Tonino Guerra.	
1961	The Night	La Notte	Yes	Yes	No	Co-written with Ennio Flaiano and Tonino Guerra.	
1962	The Eclipse	L'Eclisse	Yes	Yes	No	Co-written with Tonino Guerra and in collaboration between Elio Bartolini and Ottiero Ottieri.	
1962	The Flower and the Violence	Il fiore e la violenza	Yes	Yes	No	Co-directed with François Reichenbach and Jean Renoir; co-written with Suso Cecchi D'Amico, Diego Fabbri, Turi Vasile, François Reichenbach, and Guy de Maupassant.	
1964	Red Desert	Il Deserto Rosso	Yes	Yes	No	Co-written with Tonino Guerra.	
1965	The Three Faces	I tre volti	Yes	Yes	No	Co-written with Tullio Pinelli (segment "Gli amanti celebri"), Clive Exton (segment "Gli amanti celebri"), Alberto Sordi (segment "Latin Lover"), Rodolfo Sonego (segment "Latin Lover"), and Franco Indovina (segment "Latin Lover").	
1966	Blowup		Yes	Yes	No	Co-written with Tonino Guerra; inspired by Argentine-French writer Julio Cortázar's 1958 short story "Las babas del diablo", which was later retitled "Blow-Up" to tie in with the film.	
1970	Zabriskie Point		Yes	Yes	Yes	Co-written with Fred Gardner, Sam Shepard, Tonino Guerra, and Clare Peploe.	
1975	The Passenger	Professione: Reporter	Yes	Yes	Yes	Co-written with Mark Peploe and Peter Wollen.	
1980	The Mystery of Oberwald	Il mistero di Oberwald	Yes	Yes	Yes	Co-written with Tonino Guerra.	
1982	Identification of a Woman	Identificazione di una donna	Yes	Yes	Yes	Co-written with Gérard Brach and Tonino Guerra.	
1989	12 Directors for 12 Cities	12 registi per 12 città	Yes	Yes	No		
1995	Beyond the Clouds	Al di là delle nuvole	Yes	Yes	Yes	Co-written with Tonino Guerra and Wim Wenders.	
2004	Eros		Yes	Yes	No	Anthology film consisting of three short segments: The Hand directed by Wong Kar-wai in Mandarin, Equilibrium by Steven Soderbergh in English, and The Dangerous Thread of Things by Antonioni in Italian.	

== Short films ==
Year	English title	Original title	Notes	Ref(s)
1947	People of the Po Valley	Gente del Po	Filmed in 1943; released in 1947; 10 minutes	
1948	Dustmen	N.U. (Nettezza urbana)	11 minutes	
1948	Beyond Oblivion	Oltre l'oblio		
1948		Roma-Montevideo		
1949	Lies of Love	L'amorosa menzogna	10 minutes	
1949	Seven Reeds, One Suit	Sette canne, un vestito	10 minutes	
1949		Bomarzo		
1949	Girls in White	Ragazze in bianco		
1949	Superstition	Superstizione	9 minutes	
1950	The House of Monsters	La villa dei mostri	10 minutes	
1950	The Funicular of Mount Faloria	La funivia del Faloria	10 minutes	
1953	When Love Fails	Tentato suicidio	Segment from L'amore in città (Love in the City)	
1962		Il delitto	Segment from Il fiore e la violenza (The Flower and the Violence); released April 20, 1962	
1965		Il provino	Segment from I tre volti	
1983		Inserto girato a Lisca Bianca	8 minutes	
1989		Kumbha Mela	18 minutes	
1989	Rome	Roma	Segment from 12 registi per 12 città; produced for the 1990 FIFA World Cup	
1993	Volcanoes and Carnival	Noto, Mandorli, Vulcano, Stromboli, Carnevale	8 minutes	
1997		Sicilia	9 minutes	
2004	The Gaze of Michelangelo	Lo sguardo di Michelangelo	15 minutes	
2004	The Dangerous Thread of Things	Il filo pericoloso delle cose	Segment from Eros	

== Television ==
Year	English title	Original title	Director	Writer	Editor	Notes	Ref(s)
1972	Chung Kuo, Cina		Yes	Uncredited	No	Television documentary	
1983	Return to Lisca Bianca Island	Ritorno a Lisca Bianca	Yes	Yes	Yes	Television short	

== Bibliography ==
- Antonioni, Michelangelo (1996). The Architecture of Vision: Writings and Interviews on Cinema. New York: Marsilio. ISBN 1-56886-016-1.
- Antonioni, Michelangelo; Cardullo, Bert (2008). Michelangelo Antonioni: Interviews. Conversations with Filmmakers Series. Jackson, MS: University Press of Mississippi. ISBN 9781934110669.
- Biarese, Cesare (1985). I film di Michelangelo Antonioni. Rome: Gremese. ISBN 9788876051869.
- Bondanella, Peter (1993). The Films of Roberto Rossellini. Cambridge Film Classics. Cambridge University Press. ISBN 9780521398664.
- Brunette, Peter (1998). The Films of Michelangelo Antonioni. New York: Cambridge University Press. ISBN 978-0-521-38992-1.
- Cameron, Ian Alexander; Wood, Robin (1971). Antonioni. New York: Praeger. ISBN 9780289795989.
- Chatman, Seymour (1985). Antonioni, Or, The Surface of the World. Berkeley: University of California Press. ISBN 0520057457.
- Chatman, Seymour (2004). Michelangelo Antonioni: The Investigation. Cologne; Los Angeles: Taschen. ISBN 9783822826102.
- Cook, David A. (2004). A History of Narrative Film. New York: W. W. Norton & Company. ISBN 9780393978681.
- Ebert, Roger (1987). Roger Ebert's Movie Home Companion. Kansas City, Missouri: Andrews, McMeel & Parker. ISBN 9780836262124.
- Hammer, Tad Bentley (1991). International Film Prizes: An Encyclopedia. Garland Reference Library of the Humanities. Vol. 1333. Garland Publishing, Inc. p. 255. ISBN 978-0-8240-7099-1.
- Kezich, Tullio; Levantesi, Alessandra (2004). "Cronaca di un amore", un film di Michelangelo Antonioni. Quando un'opera prima è già un capolavoro. Grandi film restaurati (in Italian). Lindau. ISBN 978-88-7180-523-8.
- Leprohon, Pierre (1963). Michelangelo Antonioni: An Introduction. New York: Simon and Schuster. LCCN 63017728.
- Perry, Ted; Prieto, René (1986). Michelangelo Antonioni: A Guide to Reference and Resources. Boston, MA: G. K. Hall. ISBN 9780816185665.
- Pitassio, Francesco (2025). Neorealist Film Culture, 1945–1954: Rome, Open Cinema. Taylor & Francis. ISBN 978-1-040-78892-9.
- Pomerance, Murray (2011). Michelangelo Red Antonioni Blue: Eight Reflections on Cinema. Berkeley, CA: University of California Press. ISBN 9780520948303.
- Rhodes, John David; Rascaroli, Laura, eds. (2011). Antonioni: Centenary Essays. London: Bloomsbury Academic. ISBN 9781838714437.
