= Identification of a Woman =

- Theatrical release poster
- Directed by: Michelangelo Antonioni
- Screenplay by: Michelangelo Antonioni; Gérard Brach; Tonino Guerra
- Story by: Michelangelo Antonioni
- Produced by: Giorgio Nocella; Antonio Macrì
- Starring: Tomás Milián; Daniela Silverio; Christine Boisson
- Cinematography: Carlo Di Palma
- Edited by: Michelangelo Antonioni
- Music by: John Foxx
- Production companies: Iter Film; Gaumont; RAI
- Distributed by: Gaumont Distribution
- Release date: 13 May 1982 (Cannes)
- Running time: 128 minutes
- Country: Italy
- Language: Italian

Identification of a Woman (Italian: Identificazione di una donna) is a 1982 Italian–French drama film directed by Michelangelo Antonioni and starring Tomás Milián, Daniela Silverio, and Christine Boisson. It was awarded the 35th Anniversary Prize at the 1982 Cannes Film Festival.

== Plot ==
Niccolò is a film director living in Rome. He has just divorced and lives alone. His only family is his sister, a gynecologist, and her little son. By chance Niccolò gets to know one of his sister's patients, a beautiful young aristocrat called Mavi, and the two start a passionate affair.

Niccolò then receives a threat to leave Mavi. He tries to ignore it, but then finds himself under surveillance. He also feels uneasy with her blue blood ties and her former social circles. Then his sister informs him that she, the obvious candidate for the head of the gynecology department, is passed over for the job. Niccolò thinks this is the doing of his shadow blackmailer. Compounded with the 24 hour surveillance daily, the threat proves too hard to bear. He manages to convince Mavi to drive out to an old farmhouse in the country which he rented before, but the drive there through fog is traumatic and they quarrel violently. In the morning Mavi has vanished. Searching for her back in Rome, the only friend of hers who will talk to him warns Niccolò that Mavi is bisexual and hints at a jealous past lover.

Wanting company and affection, Niccolò meets a young stage actress called Ida, slim and athletic like Mavi, a working-class girl who loves the country and is not brittle or mysterious but utterly open. While she is happy to sleep with him, she realizes that he is still obsessed with Mavi and with his blackmailer. Ida finds by chance a trail to find Mavi's whereabout. Hiding himself on the stairs beyond her sight, Niccolò hears Mavi tell the girl with whom she shares a flat that she must keep on hiding from him.

Accepting at last that Mavi will never come back, he takes Ida for a romantic holiday in Venice. There she gets a phone call from her doctor in Rome, who confirms that she is pregnant. While Ida was ecstatic and wants to keep the baby, Niccolò is not keen on raising a child, especially not someone else's.

Back alone in Rome, Niccolò starts musing about his next film. He imagines a spaceship built of asteroid material that could approach the sun. He recalls telling his young nephew about space travel, saying, "The day mankind understands what the sun is made of and its power, perhaps we'll understand the entire universe and the reasons behind so many things." His nephew responds, "And then?"

== Cast ==
- Tomás Milián as Niccolò
- Daniela Silverio as Mavi
- Christine Boisson as Ida
- Lara Wendel as Girl at swimming pool
- Veronica Lazar as Carla
- Enrica Antonioni as Nadia
- Sandra Monteleoni as Mavi's sister
- Marcel Bozzuffi as Mario
- Giampaolo Saccarola as The gorilla
- Arianna De Rosa as Mavi's friend
- Dado Ruspoli as Mavi's father
- Carlos Alberto Valles as Close-up man
- Sergio Tardioli as Butcher
- Itaco Nardulli as Lucio
- Paola Dominguín as Girl in window

== Production and release ==
Identification of a Woman was shot in Rome and Venice and premiered at the 1982 Cannes Film Festival on 13 May, where it was awarded the 35th Anniversary Prize.

== Reception ==
Initial critical reactions to the film were mixed. To German critic Hans-Christoph Blumenberg (Die Zeit), Identification of a Woman looked as if it had been produced by Italy's consumer goods industry for the sophisticated taste: "so cool, so chique, so expensive". In his 1982 review for the New York Times, Vincent Canby called the film "an excruciatingly empty work" and "beautiful and sad—virtually a parody of the director's great L'Avventura and some of his other earlier films."

In an October 2011 essay published to accompany a release of a Criterion Collection edition, critic John Powers pointed out that the film had been made when Antonioni was nearing seventy: "this is one of those autumnal movies—think Rio Bravo or An Autumn Afternoon—in which an aging director allows himself to be more relaxed and genial than in his most finely tuned work. Far from serving up a major statement about the human condition—something Antonioni was never shy about doing—Identification of a Woman comes tinged with modesty and irony. His first feature set in Italy since 1964’s Red Desert, it finds him taking a provisional measure of how the modern world has been shifting around him."

== See also ==
- Michelangelo Antonioni filmography
