= Enrica Antonioni =

Italian film director and actress

- Born: Enrica Fico; 25 February 1952 (age 73); Cavi di Lavagna, Genoa, Italy

Enrica Antonioni (born Enrica Fico, 25 February 1952) is an Italian film director and actress, the widow of Michelangelo Antonioni.

== Filmography ==
=== As herself ===
- Time Within Time, documentary (2015)

=== As director ===
- Making a Film for Me is to Live, documentary (1995)
- Con Michelangelo, documentary (2005)

=== As co-director ===
- Noto, Mandorli, Vulcano, Stromboli, Carnevale, documentary (1993)

=== As actress ===
- Identification of a Woman (1982) - Nadia
- Beyond the Clouds (1995) boutique manager
- Eros (2004) - guest at the restaurant (segment "The Dangerous Thread of Things")

=== As assistant director ===
- China, documentary (1973)
- The Passenger (1975)
- Lo sguardo di Michelangelo, documentary short (2004)

=== As executive consultant ===
- Beyond the Clouds (1995)
- Eros (1995), segment The Dangerous Thread of Things

=== As writer ===
- Lo sguardo di Michelangelo, documentary short (2004): collaboration

=== As composer ===
- Eros (1995), segment: "The Dangerous Thread of Things"

=== As producer ===
- Sicilia (1997): documentary short
