= Il Grido =

1957 film by Michelangelo Antonioni

Il grido
- Theatrical release poster
- Directed by: Michelangelo Antonioni
- Screenplay by: Michelangelo Antonioni; Elio Bartolini; Ennio De Concini
- Story by: Michelangelo Antonioni
- Produced by: Franco Cancellieri
- Starring: Steve Cochran; Alida Valli; Betsy Blair; Dorian Gray
- Cinematography: Gianni di Venanzo
- Edited by: Eraldo Da Roma
- Music by: Giovanni Fusco
- Production companies: SPA Cinematografica; Robert Alexander Productions
- Distributed by: CEIAD
- Release dates: 14 July 1957 (Locarno); 3 September 1957 (Italy); 22 October 1962 (US)
- Running time: 116 minutes
- Countries: Italy; United States
- Language: Italian
- Box office: $16,549

Il grido (English: "The Cry", initially released as The Outcry in the US) is a 1957 road drama film directed by Michelangelo Antonioni and starring Steve Cochran, Alida Valli, Dorian Gray, Gabriella Pallotta and Betsy Blair.

An Italian and American co-production, the film premiered at the 1957 Locarno Film Festival, where it won the Golden Leopard. In 2008, the film was included on the Italian Ministry of Cultural Heritage’s 100 Italian films to be saved, a list of 100 films that "have changed the collective memory of the country between 1942 and 1978."

== Plot ==
Aldo, a mechanic working in a sugar refinery in the Po Valley town of Goriano, has been in a seven-year relationship with Irma, with whom he shares a daughter, Rosina. When Irma learns that her estranged husband, who left for Australia years earlier, has died, Aldo sees an opportunity to marry her and legitimize their daughter. However, Irma confesses that she has fallen in love with another man. Devastated, Aldo attempts to win her back, but after a public altercation where he slaps her, Irma ends the relationship definitively.

In response to his heartbreak, Aldo leaves Goriano with Rosina, embarking on a journey through the Po Valley. Their first stop is at the home of Elvia, Aldo's former girlfriend, who works as a seamstress. Aldo tries to rekindle their past relationship, but his lingering sorrow over Irma hinders any genuine connection. Irma visits Elvia to deliver Aldo's belongings and informs her of their separation. Elvia confronts Aldo about returning only after his breakup and encourages him to move on. Realizing he cannot stay, Aldo departs with Rosina the next morning.

As they continue traveling, Aldo struggles to find steady work that accommodates Rosina's schooling. Their relationship becomes strained, culminating in an incident where Aldo slaps Rosina after she nearly gets hit by a car. They hitch a ride atop a petrol truck but are forced to disembark before a police checkpoint. Seeking shelter, they arrive at a filling station run by Virginia, a young widow living with her elderly father. She offers them a place to stay and gives Aldo a job. Over time, Aldo and Virginia become romantically involved.

Rosina spends her days with Virginia's father, who is bitter about selling his farmland and exhibits erratic behavior. Frustrated, Virginia decides to place him in a retirement home. Tensions escalate when Rosina witnesses Aldo and Virginia's intimacy, prompting Virginia to suggest that they can no longer care for the child. Aldo reluctantly sends Rosina back to Irma, chasing after the departing bus to declare his love for his daughter.

After parting ways with Virginia, Aldo finds employment with a dredge crew and contemplates moving to Venezuela, even beginning to learn Spanish. However, he soon loses interest. He befriends Andreina, a local prostitute, helping her secure medical attention. Mistakenly believing the police are after him, Aldo flees, leaving his coat behind. Andreina locates him, and they share stories of their troubled pasts. Heavy rains and scarce resources strain their situation, leading Andreina to seek food by offering herself to a restaurant owner. A confrontation ensues, and an exasperated Aldo abandons her.

Returning to Goriano, Aldo encounters Virginia at the filling station. She returns his belongings and mentions a misplaced postcard from Irma, inciting Aldo's frustration. In Goriano, he discovers the town in turmoil over the construction of an airfield that threatens to displace residents. Observing from a distance, Aldo sees Rosina entering Irma's home and notices Irma caring for a new child. Irma spots him and follows as he makes his way to the deserted sugar refinery where he once worked.

Aldo climbs the refinery tower, appearing disoriented and weary. From below, Irma calls out to him. He turns to see her but then falls to his death. Irma rushes to his side, grieving over his lifeless body as townspeople pass by en route to a protest rally.

== Cast ==
- Steve Cochran as Aldo
- Alida Valli as Irma
- Betsy Blair as Elvia
- Gabriella Pallotta as Edera
- Dorian Gray as Virginia
- Lyn Shaw as Andreina
- Mirna Girardi as Rosina
- Pina Boldrini as Lina
- Guerrino Campanilli as Virginia's father
- Pietro Corvelatti as Fisherman
- Lilia Landi as Woman
- Gaetano Matteucci as Edera's fiancé
- Elli Parvo as Donna Matilda

Dorian Gray's voice in the film is dubbed by Monica Vitti, her first of many film collaborations with Antonioni.

== Themes ==
In retrospect, critics such as Leslie Camhi (The Village Voice), Philip French (The Guardian) and Keith Phipps (The A.V. Club) saw Il grido as a transitional work between Antonioni's neorealist roots and his later films. In her 1984 analysis of Italian cinema, Mira Liehm writes that while Il grido contains neo-realist elements, "particularly the interdependence between the landscapes and the characters and the emphasis on objects", protagonist Aldo "foreshadows Sandro in L'avventura and Giovanni in La notte in his refusal to acknowledge the fading of love".

Reviewers disagree about whether Aldo's death at the end is intentional or not. While French critic Gérard Gozlan (Positif) saw it as a suicide, Seymour Chatman argues that Aldo is overcome with vertigo as he stands atop the tower, causing him to fall to his death. Chatman found support in the original screenplay, which mentions that Aldo attempts to resist a sudden onset of vertigo as he looks down on the ground. Peter Brunette regards the ending as being ambiguous: Aldo's death can be viewed either as caused by a fall or a deliberate jump.

Liehm, Brunette and Geoffrey Nowell-Smith also point out that as an exception in Antonioni's films, the protagonist of Il grido is a member of the working class instead of the bourgeoisie, an observation confirmed by the director in an interview in which he stated that only Il grido and his early documentary short Gente del Po (1947) were about working class concerns.

== Production ==
Antonioni had written the script for Il grido in the late 1940s while working on another production in the Po area. The film was realised as an Italian–American co-production and shot in Winter 1956/1957 on location in the lower Po Valley, including Occhiobello, Pontelogoscuro, Ferrara, Stienta and Ca'Venier. Antonioni later spoke of problems he had with some of the American actors: with Betsy Blair, because she wanted the meaning behind her complete dialogue explained in detail, and with Steve Cochran for regularly refusing to follow the director's instructions.

== Release ==
Il grido premiered at the Locarno Film Festival on 14 July 1957 and in Rome on 29 November 1957. Of the films Antonioni had made up to this point, Il grido proved to be the least successful at the box office, earning a mere 25 million lire during its initial release.

In English-speaking countries, the film saw a delayed release, in late 1961 in the UK and in October 1962 in the US. In the US, it was also shown in a dubbed and shortened version, released by Astor Pictures.

In 2024, Il grido was restored by The Film Foundation, Cineteca di Bologna, and Compass Film. The restoration includes several scenes that had previously been censored. It received a theatrical release at Film Forum.

== Reception ==
While Antonioni's previous film Le Amiche had been artistically acknowledged by Italian critics, the reactions towards Il grido were, depending on the source, unanimously negative or sympathetic only in a handful of cases, calling its director "cold" and "inhuman". However, Seymour Chatman in Michaelangelo Antonioni: The Investigation cites Il grido as his "first genuine critical success", and Alexandre Astruc in his review talked about the "warmth" and "anguish" it inspires in the viewer and called Antonioni "one of the greatest living directors." In a later interview, Antonioni explained that he had been in a state of depression at the time, and that the film reflected this in a more pessimistic, desperate tone. As a result of the film's disappointing domestic reception, Antonioni was forced to cancel planned film projects and turn to theatre work, before returning to the cinema with his 1960 L'Avventura.

On the occasion of the film's 1962 New York release (where it was screened in Italian with English subtitles), The New York Times critic A. H. Weiler saw an "interesting, sometimes arresting slice of life at the lower depths", but the outlook of its director as "dismal and depressed". F. Maurice Speed, writing for the British Film Review, was more enthusiastic, calling it "brilliant" and "sad, fascinating and finely directed".

=== Awards ===
- 1957 Locarno International Film Festival: Golden Leopard for Michelangelo Antonioni
- 1958 Nastro d'Argento for Best Cinematography (Gianni di Venanzo)

== In popular culture ==
In Alfred Andersch's 1960 novel Die Rote (The Redhead), protagonist Fabio reflects on Antonioni's film.

== See also ==
- Michelangelo Antonioni filmography

== Bibliography ==
- Arrowsmith, William (1995). Ted Perry (ed.). Antonioni: The Poet of Images. New York: Oxford University Press. ISBN 978-0-19-509270-7.
- Brunette, Peter (1998). The Films of Michelangelo Antonioni. New York: Cambridge University Press. ISBN 978-0-521-38992-1.
