= The Mystery of Oberwald =

- Spanish DVD cover
- Directed by: Michelangelo Antonioni
- Written by: Michelangelo Antonioni; Tonino Guerra
- Based on: L'Aigle à deux têtes; by Jean Cocteau
- Produced by: Sergio Benvenuti; Alessandro von Norman; Giancarlo Bernardoni
- Starring: Monica Vitti; Paolo Bonacelli; Franco Branciaroli
- Cinematography: Luciano Tovoli
- Edited by: Michelangelo Antonioni; Francesco Grandoni
- Music by: Guido Turchi; (musical consultant)
- Production companies: RAI; Polytel International
- Distributed by: CIDIF
- Release date: 3 September 1980 (Italy)
- Running time: 129 minutes
- Countries: Italy; West Germany
- Languages: Italian; German

The Mystery of Oberwald (Italian: Il mistero di Oberwald) is a 1980 Italian–German television drama film directed by Michelangelo Antonioni and starring Monica Vitti, Paolo Bonacelli, and Franco Branciaroli. It is based on the 1946 play L'Aigle à deux têtes by Jean Cocteau.

== Plot ==
In an unnamed middle European state in the nineteenth century, the reigning queen has been in mourning and hides from the public since the assassination of her husband King Frederic ten years ago. Constantly changing her residence, she is accompanied only by her reader and chambermaid Edith, her personal servant Tony, and the loyal Duke of Willenstein. During her stay in the castle of Oberwald, young radical poet Sebastian breaks into her chamber, intending to kill her, but faints due to a wound inflicted during his flight from the police. The queen is surprised by the similarity between the intruder and her deceased husband, and discovers that he is the author of a subversive poem that she liked, even though it was attacking her. She dares Sebastian to kill her, vowing that otherwise, she will kill him. Towards her household, she pretends that he is her new reader, concealing his true identity. Accusing Edith of spying on her, the queen has her put under arrest.

While wandering around the Oberwald estate on the next day, Sebastian and the queen recognise that they have fallen in love with each other. When she tells Sebastian that she is being dominated by her mother-in-law, and that Count of Foehn, the chief of police, has ambitions to enter the throne, Sebastian convinces her to show presence in the capital and act as a sovereign. Count Foehn, having heard of the queen's intentions to return to the capital and knowing that Sebastian is the sought after escapee, blackmails Sebastian to talk her out of her plans. Sebastian rejects and takes a slow-acting poison instead. The queen, furious that Sebastian didn't kill her first as she had asked him, declares that she had plotted with Count von Foehn against him. In a fit of rage, Sebastian shoots the queen and collapses afterwards. The dying queen confesses that she made up the plot so he would keep his promise, and that she still loves him.

== Cast ==
- Monica Vitti as the queen
- Paolo Bonacelli as Count of Foehn
- Franco Branciaroli as Sebastian
- Elisabetta Pozzi as Edith de Berg
- Luigi Diberti as Felix, Duke of Willenstein
- Amad Saha Alan as Tony, the queen's servant

== Production and release ==
Antonioni had been approached by Italian television station RAI with the idea of a film shot entirely with television equipment, which would at the same time reunite the director with his former star Monica Vitti, with whom he had last worked on Red Desert (1964). After abandoning the idea of adapting Jean Cocteau's stage play La voix humaine, which had been previously filmed by Roberto Rossellini, Antonioni chose to adapt Cocteau's play L'Aigle à deux têtes instead. Although being critical of Cocteau (whom he once called "clever, fanciful, but limited"), and aware of the fact that he had been hired for a commissioned work, Antonioni was looking forward to experimenting with a new technical format. The film was shot on television equipment in 64 days, with Antonioni manipulating the images' colours during the post-production process, and later transferred to 35 mm film. The film's score consisted entirely of classical compositions by Richard Strauss, Johannes Brahms, and Arnold Schoenberg.

The Mystery of Oberwald premiered at the Venice Film Festival on 3 September 1980. It was screened the following year at the New York Film Festival on 30 September 1981. In Germany, co-producing country of the film, it aired on TV the first time in 1982, but never saw a theatrical release.

== Reception ==
Upon its release, The Mystery of Oberwald received mixed reviews, accusing its director for betraying the tradition of realist Italian cinema or praising his courage for taking new technical challenges. Other reviewers saw little more than a minor exercise in an inferior format. After the film's Venice premiere, German critic Hans-Christoph Blumenberg's résumé was that of an "arbitrary" playing with colour effects which falls far behind Antonioni's earlier experiments in Red Desert and Blow-Up, and whose only merit was Vitti's outstanding performance. In his 1981 review in The New York Times, Vincent Canby described the use of video colour techniques as a mere attempt to give a dramatic appearance to a "fairly conventional narrative". In 1982, Dave Kehr came to a less negative conclusion, stating that, although Antonioni had ultimately failed to achieve a fully developed aesthetic in the new medium video, the film's exploratory character should be taken into consideration.

== Awards ==
The Mystery of Oberwald received the Nastro d'Argento (Silver Ribbon) from the Italian National Syndicate of Film Journalists in 1982 for its electronic visual effects.

== Home media ==
The Mystery of Oberwald was released in English language on NTSC video cassette in 2000. In later years, DVD versions of the film have been released in Italian, French and Spanish language.

== See also ==
- Michelangelo Antonioni filmography
- Color grading
- The Eagle with Two Heads (1948 Cocteau film)
