= Story of a Love Affair =

1950 Italian film

- DVD cover
- Directed by: Michelangelo Antonioni
- Screenplay by: Michelangelo Antonioni; Daniele D'Anza; Silvio Giovannetti; Francesco Maselli; Piero Tellini
- Story by: Michelangelo Antonioni
- Produced by: Franco Villani
- Starring: Massimo Girotti; Lucia Bosè
- Cinematography: Enzo Serafin
- Edited by: Eraldo Da Roma
- Music by: Giovanni Fusco
- Production company: Villani Film
- Distributed by: Fincine
- Release date: 11 October 1950 (Italy)
- Running time: 98 minutes
- Country: Italy
- Language: Italian

Story of a Love Affair (Italian: Cronaca di un amore), released in the United Kingdom as Chronicle of a Love, is a 1950 Italian drama film directed by Michelangelo Antonioni in his feature-length directorial debut. The film stars Massimo Girotti and Lucia Bosè in lead roles. Despite some neorealist background, the film was not fully compliant with the contemporary Italian neorealist style both in its story and image, featuring upper-class characters portrayed by professional actors. Ferdinando Sarmi was, however, a fashion designer rather than a professional actor. Its story was inspired by the James M. Cain novel The Postman Always Rings Twice. In the film, the camera pans the same street corner in Ferrara, the director's native city, that appears in his film Beyond the Clouds forty-five years later. In 1951, the film won the Nastro d'Argento Award for Best Original Score (Giovanni Fusco) and the Special Nastro d'Argento (Michelangelo Antonioni) for "human and stylistic values".

In 2008, the film was included on the Italian Ministry of Cultural Heritage's 100 Italian films to be saved, a list of 100 films that "have changed the collective memory of the country between 1942 and 1978."

== Plot ==
At a detective agency in Milan, Carloni is looking through photographs of an attractive young woman, Paola Molon Fontana, given to the agency by her wealthy industrialist husband, Enrico Fontana. The couple were married seven years ago, shortly after meeting each other. Fontana's recent discovery of these old photos have aroused his suspicion, and Carloni is hired to uncover whatever he can about Paola's life before her marriage. Carloni travels to the town of Ferrara, where Paola spent much of her youth. The detective soon discovers that she was best friends with two girls in town. He goes to the apartment of one of her friends, Matilde, and learns from her husband that Matilde's friend Giovanna Carlini died in a tragic elevator shaft fall a few days before she was to be married to Guido Garroni, a local boy with whom Paola had also been involved. When the sullen Matilde arrives home, she refuses to cooperate with Carloni. After the detective leaves, Matilde writes a letter to Guido, alerting him that a suspicious man is investigating Paola's past.

Back in Milan, as Paola exits the La Scala opera house dressed in a white fur coat with her husband and friends, she is startled to see Guido standing across the street. Later that night, she receives a phone call from him and they agree to meet the following day. At Idroscalo lake, Guido, who is now a struggling car dealer, shares Matilde's letter with Paola. The thought that someone is digging into their past frightens Paola, making her think that perhaps Matilde is trying to extort money from her. With their former attraction rekindled, the two agree to meet again. Meanwhile, Carloni's investigation intensifies, as he finds out more about the mysterious accident in the elevator shaft, Paola's sudden disappearance, and Guido's role in all this. He learns from Giovanna's maid that Paola and Guido were with Giovanna when she fell to her death, and that they did not cry out or rush to her side to see if she was still alive. He also learns that Paola left Ferrara two days after the accident and met her future husband shortly thereafter in Milan—never telling him about her friend's death.

In the coming days, Paola and Guido's once-casual reunion escalates into a full-blown passionate affair played out in rented rooms. To help Guido earn money, Paola arranges for him to be the middleman in a car sale that doesn't work out. As their affair progresses, Paola's frustration with her loveless marriage leads her to suggest to Guido that her husband's death would benefit both of them. At first Guido is repulsed by the suggestion, but is influenced by Paola's emotional manipulation. Later they meet on a bridge over a desolate canal that Fontana crosses on his way home. Guido plans to shoot him as he approaches the bridge. Paola pretends to have second thoughts, accusing Guido of being responsible for Giovanna's death—he saw the elevator door open and did not warn her. Guido reminds her that she too did nothing to warn her friend, and that they will both be responsible for this death as well.

Pressured to complete his investigation as soon as possible, Carloni writes of the affair and suspicious circumstances surrounding her friend's death, and submits the report to Fontana. Upset by the revelation, Fontana gets in his car and drives home along the canal road, where Guido is waiting. As the car approaches, Guido hears the sound of a car crash in the distance. He leaves the bridge on bicycle and rides to the scene of the accident, where Fontana's overturned car is engulfed in flames. Fontana's dead body is lying nearby. (Note: The cause of Fontana's death is left ambiguous. After learning of his wife's infidelity, he drives off at high speed and most likely lost control of the car along he canal road. From the bridge, however, Guido hears two bangs that sound like gunshots coming from the scene of the accident. Later in the taxi, Guido tells Paola that he saw a hole in Fontana's throat "as if he'd been shot".)

Soon after, as police arrive at her home to inform her of the accident, Paola runs off, thinking they've come to arrest her. She meets up with Guido who informs her about her husband's death and that he was not involved. After Paola declares her love for Guido, he agrees to meet her the following day. As he steps into the taxi, he asks to be taken to the train station.

== Cast ==
- Massimo Girotti as Guido Garroni
- Lucia Bosè as Paola Molon Fontana
- Gino Rossi as Carloni, the detective
- Marika Rowsky as Joy, the model
- Ferdinando Sarmi as Enrico Fontana
- Rosi Mirafiore as Barmaid
- Rubi D'Alma as Paola's friend
- Vittoria Mondello as Matilde
- Franco Fabrizi as Fashion show presentator

== Production ==
=== Casting ===
The nineteen-year-old Lucia Bosè, who was Miss Italy 1947, first met Antonioni over lunch at Luchino Visconti's house. Antonioni was desperately searching for a female lead for his next film at the time, and Visconti recommended Bosè to him. Initially skeptical of her maturity, he selected her for the role after an audition.

=== Filming ===
In a 2018 interview, Bosè commented, "On that set, for the first time, I felt beautiful; I wore wonderful dresses and amazing hats similar to those of Gala, Salvador Dali's wife." Bosè, however, also spoke about difficulty she experienced working on the film's set due to Antonioni's strictness. She recalled a particularly bad day in which, after shooting 40 takes, she broke character and laughed in response to assistant director Citto Maselli's humorous attempt to defuse the tension on set. Antonioni approached her in a fury and slapped her in front of everyone. Bosè refused to lose her temper, composed herself, and requested to continue filming.

Filming locations

- FERT Studios, Turin, Piedmont, Italy
- Ferrara, Emilia-Romagna, Italy
- Idroscalo, Milan, Lombardia, Italy
- Milan, Lombardia, Italy
- Planetario di Milano, Milan, Lombardia, Italy

== Release ==
=== Critical response ===
In his review for Slant magazine, Dan Callahan gave the film four stars, calling it a "new type of reflective cinema ... dedicated equally to the interior lives of actor 'models' and the obscure surfaces of the photographed world". Callahan dismisses the "seemingly standard noir subject" and praises the "unsurpassed beauty of Antonioni's visual art" which lifts the story and hollow characters "into the exalted realm of the senses", transforming noir into "existential poetry". Callahan concludes:

It's extremely difficult to follow the film scene by scene; the camera wanders away from people and makes radical choices in what it wants to look at and linger over. What at first seems like clumsiness finally falls away and something highly original takes its place: an ambiguous meditation on the emptiness of upwardly mobile modern life.

=== Awards ===
| Award | Date | Category | Recipient(s) | Result | Ref. |
|---|---|---|---|---|---|
| Nastro d'Argento | 1951 | Special Nastro d'Argento | Michelangelo Antonioni | Won | |
| Nastro d'Argento | 1951 | Best Original Score | Giovanni Fusco | Won | |

== See also ==
- Michelangelo Antonioni filmography
