= Franco Branciaroli =

Italian actor, stage director and writer

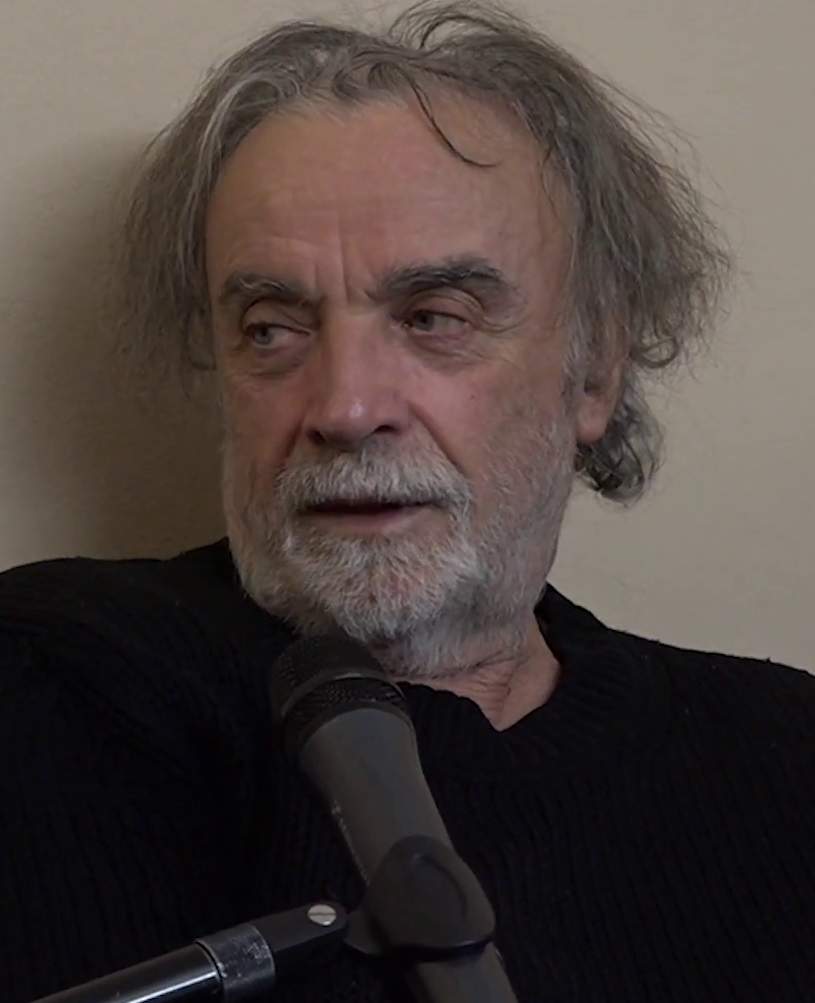
- Branciaroli in 2023
- Born: 27 May 1947 (age 79); Milan, Italy
- Occupations: Actor; stage director; writer

Franco Branciaroli (born 27 March 1947) is an Italian actor, stage director and writer.

== Life and career ==
Born in Milan, Branciaroli studied acting at the drama school of the Piccolo Teatro, and made his professional debut in 1970, in an adaptation of Tankred Dorst's Toller directed by Patrice Chéreau. He later worked with prominent stage directors such as Carmelo Bene, Luca Ronconi, Aldo Trionfo, Gianfranco De Bosio, and in the second half of the 1980s he started an acclaimed collaboration with Giovanni Testori. The founder of the stage company Compagnia degli Incamminati, Branciaroli made his debut as a stage director in 1981. In 2022, he debuted as a writer with the novel La carne tonda. In cinema, Branciaroli acted in five films by the famous Italian director Tinto Brass.

== Selected filmography ==
- Private Vices, Public Pleasures, directed by Miklós Jancsó (1976)
- Black Journal, directed by Mauro Bolognini (1977)
- The Mystery of Oberwald, directed by Michelangelo Antonioni (1980)
- The Key, directed by Tinto Brass (1983)
- Miranda, directed by Tinto Brass (1985)
- All Ladies Do It, directed by Tinto Brass (1992)
- The Voyeur, directed by Tinto Brass (1994)
- Senso '45, directed by Tinto Brass (2002)
- I Viceré, directed by Roberto Faenza (2007)
- Black and White, directed by Cristina Comencini (2008)
- The Woman of My Dreams, directed by Luca Lucini (2010)
- Couple Therapy for Cheaters, directed by Alessio Maria Federici (2017)
