= Ferdinando Sarmi =

American fashion designer and businessman

- Born: February 14, 1912
- Died: 1982 (aged 69–70); Verona, Italy
- Occupation: Fashion designer
- Known for: Head of Sarmi fashion design house

Count Ferdinando Sarmi (February 14, 1912 – 1982) was an Italian-born American fashion designer and businessman. He headed the Sarmi fashion design house in New York City.

== Early years ==
Sarmi was born into a wealthy Italian family and raised in Trieste. He expressed interest in fashion as a youth but was discouraged from pursuing a design career by his father. Sarmi stated in a 1965 interview with Time magazine, "in Italy, when the oldest son tells his father he wants to be a dress designer, it's like a woman saying she intends to be a prostitute". His father sent him to study at the University of Siena, where he received a doctor of law degree. Despite his professional training, he desired a career in fashion. He became a costume designer and created costumes for two Italian films: Musica Proibita (released as Forbidden Music in the US) in 1942 and Cronaca di un Amore (released as Story of a Love Affair in the US) in 1950. It was his first and only known on-screen performance. He left Italy in 1951 to work in New York fashion.

== New York ==
From 1951–1959, Sarmi was head designer for Elizabeth Arden. He then opened his own high quality ready-to-wear salon in New York in 1959, using the label Sarmi. In 1960, he won a Coty Award. It was during this time that he developed a reputation as a top designer, wooing an influential clientele that included celebrities, New York socialites, and foreign dignitaries. Pat Nixon wore a Sarmi for Arden gown to her husband's second inaugural ball in 1957. He was best known for his opulent evening looks, and for his use of extravagant fabrics such as swansdown. He became a naturalized United States citizen on January 12, 1959.

Sarmi left Arden and opened his own Seventh Avenue boutique in 1959. In 1960, he was awarded the prestigious Coty Award for fashion design. His collection included haute couture and ready-to-wear apparel that set the pace for 1960s fashion in New York. His designs commonly featured intricate embroideries, vivid colors, and racy hemlines as well as hand-silkscreened silks and the first-ever tie-dyed silk chiffons used in haute couture, designed and produced by Tzaims Luksus. During the late 1960s, the house fell upon financial difficulties. In 1972, his business was renamed Ferdinando Sarmi, but it closed shortly thereafter. By 1977, Sarmi had resettled in Italy, and he died in Verona in 1982.
