= Urbinati =

Urbinati is an Italian surname. Notable people with the surname include:

- Giovanni Urbinati (1946–2023), Italian ceramicist and sculptor
- Rob Urbinati (born 1952), American playwright, screenwriter, author, and director
- Nadia Urbinati (born 1955), Italian political theorist
