= Gente del Po =

1947 Italian film

- Directed by: Michelangelo Antonioni
- Cinematography: Piero Portalupi
- Edited by: Carlo Alberto Chiesa
- Music by: Mario Labroca
- Production companies: Artisti Associati; I.C.E.T., Milan
- Release date: 1947
- Running time: 11 minuntes
- Country: Italy
- Language: Italian

Gente del Po, sometimes referred to in English as People of the Po Valley, is an Italian documentary short film directed by Michelangelo Antonioni in 1943 and released in 1947. It was Antonioni's debut film and is, together with Luchino Visconti's Ossessione, considered to be one of the earliest examples of Italian neorealism. Gente del Po documents people living on or near the Po river, including barge workers and fishermen.

== Production ==
Gente del Po was shot in 1943 near Antonioni's home town Ferrara, but in the light of the escalating events of World War II, the editing of the film had to be shelved. When Antonioni started editing the film in 1947, much of the shot material had been irreversibly damaged due to improper storage and handling. In later interviews, Antonioni referred to his film as his "own brand of neorealism" by focussing on people instead of sceneries, objects or pieces of art which, in his view, Italian documentary filmmakers had done up to this point. Without his knowledge, Antonioni explained, he had been on the same path as Visconti who was shooting Ossessione at the same time in the same region.

== Legacy ==
Gente del Po has been screened as part of retrospectives on Antonioni at various festivals and institutions, including the Museum of Modern Art, the Berkeley Art Museum and Pacific Film Archive, and the Cinémathèque Française. It has been released on home media as part of The Criterion Collection's release of Antonioni's Red Desert.
