= Black Journal =

1977 film by Mauro Bolognini

- Theatrical release poster
- Italian: Gran bollito
- Directed by: Mauro Bolognini
- Screenplay by: Nicola Badalucco
- Story by: Luciano Vincenzoni; Nicola Badalucco
- Produced by: Sandra Riccardi Infascelli
- Starring: Shelley Winters; Max von Sydow; Renato Pozzetto; Alberto Lionello; Adriana Asti; Rita Tushingham; Milena Vukotic; Mario Scaccia; Liù Bosisio; Franco Branciaroli; Antonio Marsina; Maria Monti; Laura Antonelli
- Cinematography: Armando Nannuzzi
- Edited by: Nino Baragli
- Music by: Enzo Jannacci
- Distributed by: Produzioni Atlas Consorziate
- Release date: October 1977
- Running time: 112 minutes
- Country: Italy
- Languages: Italian; English
- Budget: L.1.9 billion ($2 million)
- Box office: L.480 million

Black Journal (Italian: Gran bollito, lit. 'Large bollito') is a 1977 Italian black comedy film directed by Mauro Bolognini. It is loosely based on real-life serial killer Leonarda Cianciulli, who killed three women between 1939 and 1940, and turned their bodies into soap and teacakes. It stars Shelley Winters, Max von Sydow, Renato Pozzetto and Alberto Lionello, with the latter three in a dual role as both the victims of the killer, in drag, and those who apprehend her.

In the film, a middle-aged mother is convinced that she can keep her only son safe and in her custody by offering human sacrifices to Death. After having already killed three victims, she plans further sacrifices to protect her son from the perceived threat of military service.

== Plot ==
Lea, a mature Neapolitan woman who runs a lotto box office in a northern Italian city, had thirteen children; all but one died from miscarriage or after a few months of life. Her only surviving child, Michele, receives Lea's morbid affection: she is convinced that she has stolen him from Death by negotiating with it, so she is not willing to sell him either to the army or to another woman.

When Michele gets engaged to a beautiful dance teacher, his mother, to avoid separation, makes a new sacrifice to Death, killing three spinster friends, from whom she makes soap and biscuits. The call to military service arrives for her son: to make him return home, Lea would like to multiply her sacrificial rites, targeting, this time, a mute servant and Michele's hated girlfriend. The carabinieri will stop her on time.

== Cast ==
- Shelley Winters as Lea
- Max von Sydow as Lisa / carabinieri sergeant
- Renato Pozzetto as Stella / carabiniere
- Alberto Lionello as Berta / bank manager
- Adriana Asti as Palma
- Rita Tushingham as Maria
- Milena Vukotic as Tina
- Mario Scaccia as Rosario
- Liù Bosisio as crippled neighbor
- Franco Branciaroli as Father Onorio
- Antonio Marsina as Michele
- Maria Monti as second neighbor
- Laura Antonelli as Sandra
- Marco Modugno as student
- Alberto Squillante as policeman
- Giancarlo Badessi as Lisa's friend
- Franco Balducci

== Production ==
Mauro Bolognini was originally going to direct the film 15 years earlier, with Anna Magnani in the lead role. Later, he envisioned Sophia Loren as the leading actress. The film had several working titles from 1976 to 1977, including Black Journal, La cuoca del diavolo, Sapone di donna, Donne all'interno, La saponificatrice and La signora degli orrori.

Ornella Muti was cast as the girlfriend of Lea's son, but dropped out in June 1977 and was replaced by Laura Antonelli.
