= That Bowling Alley on the Tiber =

1983 book by Michelangelo Antonioni

- Author: Michelangelo Antonioni
- Original title: Quel bowling sul Tevere
- Translator: William Arrowsmith
- Language: Italian
- Genre: sketch stories
- Publisher: Giulio Einaudi Editore
- Publication date: 1983
- Publication place: Italy
- English publication date: 1986
- Pages: 224
- ISBN: 8806055968

That Bowling Alley on the Tiber: Tales of a Director (Italian: Quel bowling sul Tevere) is a 1983 book by the Italian filmmaker Michelangelo Antonioni. It is a collection of personal reflections and narrative sketches, varying in length from a few lines to a few pages. Antonioni called these texts "nuclei" and described them as prototypes for unproduced films. Some of the material had been published previously in periodicals. The English translation by William Arrowsmith was published in 1986.

Four sketch stories from the book were the basis for the film Beyond the Clouds, directed by Antonioni as his last feature film and released in 1995. Another story was the basis for Antonioni's segment in the film anthology Eros from 2004.
