= The Lady Without Camelias =

1953 film by Michelangelo Antonioni

- Theatrical release poster
- Directed by: Michelangelo Antonioni
- Screenplay by: Michelangelo Antonioni; Suso Cecchi d'Amico; Francesco Maselli; Pier Maria Pasinetti
- Story by: Michelangelo Antonioni
- Produced by: Domenico Forges Davanzati
- Starring: Lucia Bosé; Gino Cervi; Andrea Checchi
- Cinematography: Enzo Serafin
- Edited by: Eraldo Da Roma
- Music by: Giovanni Fusco
- Production companies: Produzioni D. Forges Davanzati; Ente Nazionale Industrie Cinematografiche
- Distributed by: Ente Nazionale Industrie Cinematografiche
- Release date: 27 February 1953 (Italy)
- Running time: 105 minutes
- Countries: Italy; France
- Language: Italian

The Lady Without Camelias (Italian: La signora senza camelie) is a 1953 French–Italian drama film directed by Michelangelo Antonioni and starring Lucia Bosé, Gino Cervi, and Andrea Checchi. Based on a story by Antonioni, the film is about a newly discovered starlet and her experiences in the film business.

== Plot ==
Film executive Gianni Franchi discovers young shop assistant Clara Manni and makes her the star of his new film, Woman Without Destiny. When test screenings reveal that the public is enamoured with Clara, but less enthusiastic about the film itself, producer Ercole uses her presence in her second feature, which is still in production, by emphasising its scenes of passion. Clara is taken by surprise by Gianni's marriage proposal, to which she reluctantly agrees. Once married, Gianni, who becomes jealous over the provocative marketing for her film, categorically states that he doesn't want her involved with it anymore. He makes her the star of a new version of the trial of Joan of Arc, with Gianni himself in the director's chair, but the film is panned during its premiere at the Venice Film Festival. Clara's ambitions to become a serious actress fail, as does her marriage, and she eventually returns to the melodramatic material in which she had given her debut.

== Cast ==
- Lucia Bosé as Clara Manni
- Gino Cervi as Ercole
- Andrea Checchi as Gianni Franchi
- Ivan Desny as Nardo Rusconi
- Monica Clay as Simonetta
- Alain Cuny as Lodi
- Gisella Sofio as Simonetta's friend
- Anna Carena as Clara's mother
- Enrico Glori as Director

== Production ==
Antonioni had based his scenario for The Lady Without Camelias on stories of discovered actresses like Gina Lollobrigida, who refused to star in his film, as did Sophia Loren. Eventually Lucia Bosé was chosen for the title role, who had started her career as a beauty queen. The film was shot in Rome, Venice and Milan.

== Reception ==
For Jonathan Rosenbaum, The Lady Without Camelias, while not a masterpiece, "impresses through its annexation of an all-too-familiar theme to the personal and singular style of its director", making it possibly "Antonioni's most unjustly neglected fiction feature". In his 1981 review for The New York Times, Vincent Canby titled The Lady Without Camelias a "cool, almost frosty soap opera" and a preface to his later work.

== Home media ==
The movie was released on Blu-ray and DVD on 21 March 2011 in the United Kingdom.

== See also ==
- Michelangelo Antonioni filmography
