= Chung Kuo, Cina =

- Home video cover art
- Directed by: Michelangelo Antonioni
- Written by: Andrea Barbato
- Cinematography: Luciano Tovoli
- Edited by: Franco Arcalli
- Music by: Luciano Berio
- Production company: RAI ITC
- Distributed by: ITC English Language version
- Release date: 1972
- Running time: 220 minutes
- Language: Italian

Chung Kuo, Cina ([ˌtʃuŋˈkwo ˈtʃiːna], "Zhongguo, China") is a 1972 Italian television documentary directed by Michelangelo Antonioni. Antonioni and his crew were invited to China and filmed for five weeks, beginning in Beijing and travelling southwards. The resulting film was denounced as slanderous by the Chinese Communist Party and the Italian Communist Party.

== Release ==
Chung Kuo was scheduled to be shown at the Museum of Modern Art on December 26, 1972, as part of a series of films made for RAI, but the film was not yet ready for public showing. The film was aired on Italian television in three weekly parts from January 24 to February 7, 1973.

== Reception ==
Andrei Tarkovsky considered it a masterpiece and named it one of the 77 essential works of cinema.

Chung Kuo was well received in Italy, provoking discussion on "Antonioni's China" as well as screenings and airings in other countries. The film was also well-received when previewed by Chinese diplomats in Italy.

John J. O'Connor, writing in The New York Times, compared Chung Kuo (truncated to two hours for American television) favorably to the NBC-produced special The Forbidden City, commenting that the former "reaches a degree of sophistication that would appear to be beyond the capabilities or experience of most American television".

A screening of the film at the 1974 Venice Film Festival was met with angry protests by Italian communists. A police cordon was created to protect the screening venue.

Chinese Communist Party leaders interpreted the film as reactionary and anti-Chinese for showing what they considered to be the embarrassing blemishes of everyday life. In their view, the film failed to show the transformations in China after its revolution. Interpreting the film through the principles of the Yan'an Talks, particularly the idea that there is no such thing as art for art's sake, party leaders construed Antonioni's aesthetic choices as politically-motivated efforts to humiliate China and as an "imperialist way of seeing". Jiang Qing criticized Premier Zhou Enlai's role in Antonioni's invitation to China as not only a failure but also treasonous.A year after the initial broadcast, the People's Daily published a scathing editorial titled A Vicious Motive, Despicable Tricks (Chinese: 恶毒的用心, 卑劣的手法), denouncing the film and accusing Antonioni of creating "viciously distorted scenes" in order to "slander China’s Great Proletarian Cultural Revolution and insult the Chinese people". The editorial was followed by a mass anti-Antonioni campaign, with activities including televised denouncements, written criticisms from around the country, and schoolchildren being taught anti-Antonioni songs. The campaign was later attributed to the Gang of Four. Antonioni was rehabilitated by the People's Daily in 1979.

Chung Kuo was screened publicly for the first time in China in 2004 at the Beijing Film Academy. The film is generally well-regarded by contemporary Chinese audiences for its depictions of a simpler time.

== See also ==
- Michelangelo Antonioni filmography
