= I Vinti =

1953 Italian film

I vinti
- DVD cover
- Directed by: Michelangelo Antonioni
- Written by: Michelangelo Antonioni; Giorgio Bassani; Suso Cecchi d'Amico; Diego Fabbri; Roger Nimier (French); Turi Vasile
- Produced by: Mario Gabrielli
- Starring: Franco Interlenghi; Anna Maria Ferrero; Eduardo Ciannelli
- Cinematography: Enzo Serafin
- Edited by: Eraldo Da Roma
- Music by: Giovanni Fusco
- Production companies: Film Costellazione Produzione; Société Générale de Cinématographie
- Distributed by: Film Costellazione Produzione
- Release dates: 4 September 1953 (US); 21 October 1953 (Italy); 2 January 1963 (France)
- Running time: 110 minutes
- Countries: Italy; France
- Languages: French; Italian; English

I vinti (English: The Vanquished) is a 1953 drama film directed by Michelangelo Antonioni. An anthology film, it consists of three separate stories in three different countries, all with the common theme of youths who commit murders. In the French story, set in Paris, two schoolboys decide to kill a classmate for his money. In the Italian story, set in Rome, a university student who is involved in smuggling cigarettes shoots a man during a police raid. In the English story, set in London, a young unemployed man says he has found the body of a woman and tries to sell his story to the press. The film was a project of Film Constellation to Suso Cecchi d'Amico, who proposed Antonioni as director, and it screened at the 1953 Venice Film Festival.

== Plot ==
=== The French story ===
Two teenagers decide to murder their friend, Pierre, who is always boasting about how much money he has. Their plan is for a group of boys and girls, including Pierre, to go to a ruined château outside Paris where there is allegedly buried treasure. Getting Pierre alone, they shoot him with a pistol they have acquired. His money is illusory and he is wounded but not dead, so they flee off home. The father of the boy who fired the gun convinces him to turn himself in to the police.

=== The Italian story ===
Although the only child of wealthy parents, Claudio is in a gang smuggling American cigarettes. When police raid an operation, he shoots one dead and flees alone. Falling in the dark, he injures himself badly. He makes it to the house of his girlfriend, but she drives him to a hospital. Staggering off home, his parents find him dead on his bed.

=== The English story ===
The crime reporter of a daily newspaper takes a telephone call from Aubrey, a young man who says he has found the body of a woman on the heath and wants payment for his story. The newspaper alert the police, who locate and remove the body. Then they print Aubrey's account on the front page, with his photograph, and pay him. In search of further fame, Aubrey then confesses that he was the murderer but is confident that there is not enough evidence to convict him. There was an error in his original story however, which the police spot, and he is sentenced to death.

== Cast ==
French story

- Jean-Pierre Mocky
- Etchika Choureau as Simone
- Henri Poirier
- Albert Michel as Georges' father

Italian story

- Franco Interlenghi as Claudio
- Anna Maria Ferrero as Marina
- Eduardo Ciannelli as Claudio's father
- Evi Maltagliati as Claudio's mother

English story

- Patrick Barr as Ken Wharton
- Fay Compton as Mrs Pinkerton
- Peter Reynolds as Aubrey
- David Farrar

== Production and release ==
The theatrical film was dubbed into Italian for all three episodes, although the Paris episode is spoken in French, and the London episode in English. The Italian DVD by Medusa Film offers the restored uncut trilingual version.

The Italian episode was modified for censorship reasons, but it was later included in the 1962 anthology film Il fiore e la violenza. The entire film was refused a certificate by the British Board of Film Censors in 1954, and has never been released in the UK. The French episode had trouble with French censorship, and was not released until 1963.

The English-language episode is loosely based on the murder of 48 year old Mrs Mabel Tattershaw by Herbert Leonard Mills, aged 19. Wanting to commit the "perfect murder", on 3 August 1951 Mills lured Tattershaw to Sherwood Vale, where he struck her about the head, and strangled her. He then returned home and waited for the body to be discovered. When this had not happened by 9 August he rang the News of the World, told them he had found the body of a strangled woman, and demanded payment for his story. Mills was quickly implicated, tried for the crime, and found guilty. He was executed on 11 December 1951. A report by the Nottingham Evening Post of Mills's arrest for the crime is shown on screen during the narrated introduction to the film, amongst others from across Europe reporting crimes by youths, including John Straffen.

== Reception ==
I vinti, while seldom ranked with Antonioni's best efforts, is met with positive reception. Review aggregator Rotten Tomatoes reports 86% approval among seven critics.

== See also ==
- Michelangelo Antonioni filmography
