= Elio Bartolini =

Italian writer

Elio Bartolini (1922, Conegliano, Veneto, Italy, - 30 April 2006, Santa Marizza di Varmo, Friuli-Venezia Giulia, Italy) was an Italian writer, screenwriter and poet. He was a co-author of screenplays of Michelangelo Antonioni's Il grido (1957), L'Avventura (1960) and L'Eclisse (1962). In 1975 he directed his only film, L'altro dio.
