= Beyond the Clouds (1995 film) =

1995 anthology film by Michelangelo Antonioni and Wim Wenders

- Italian theatrical release poster
- Directed by: Michelangelo Antonioni; Wim Wenders
- Written by: Michelangelo Antonioni; Tonino Guerra; Wim Wenders
- Based on: That Bowling Alley on the Tiber: Tales of a Director (1986 book) by Michelangelo Antonioni
- Produced by: Philippe Carcassonne; Stéphane Tchalgadjieff
- Starring: Fanny Ardant; Chiara Caselli; Irène Jacob; John Malkovich; Sophie Marceau; Vincent Perez; Jean Reno; Kim Rossi Stuart; Inés Sastre; Peter Weller; Marcello Mastroianni; Jeanne Moreau; Enrica Antonioni
- Cinematography: Alfio Contini; Robby Müller
- Edited by: Michelangelo Antonioni; Claudio Di Mauro; Peter Przygodda; Lucian Segura
- Music by: Lucio Dalla; Bono; Adam Clayton; Van Morrison; Laurent Petitgand
- Distributed by: Kidmark (Italy); PolyGram Film Distribution (France); Kinowelt Filmverleih (Germany)
- Release dates: 27 October 1995 (Italy); 9 November 1995 (Germany); 24 January 1996 (France)
- Running time: 112 minutes
- Country: Italy; Germany; France
- Languages: Italian; French; English
- Box office: $3,252,000 (Italy); $31,738 (USA)

Beyond the Clouds (Italian: Al di là delle nuvole; French: Par-delà les nuages) is a 1995 anthology romance film directed by Michelangelo Antonioni and Wim Wenders, from a screenplay written by Antonioni, Wenders and Tonino Guerra. It stars an ensemble cast, featuring John Malkovich, Sophie Marceau, Vincent Perez, Irène Jacob, Jean Reno, Fanny Ardant, Chiara Caselli, Kim Rossi Stuart, Peter Weller, Marcello Mastroianni and Jeanne Moreau.

The film consists of four stories of romantic love and illusion told from the perspective of a wandering film director (played by Malkovich). In the first story, two beautiful young lovers are unable to consummate their passion because the young man desires impossible perfection. In the second story, the director has sex with a young woman who reveals that she murdered her father. In the third story, a man makes an effort to appease both his wife and his mistress. In the fourth story, a young man is infatuated with a girl who is about to enter a convent.

A co-production between Italian, French and German companies, Beyond the Clouds was based on Antonioni's 1986 book That Bowling Alley on the Tiber. It was conceived by Wim Wenders as a comeback for the then-retired filmmaker, who had been semi-retired since 1982 (with Identification of a Woman). It was the final feature-length film by Antonioni before his death in 2007.

== Plot ==
=== Wraparound ===
An unnamed film director is flying to Italy following the conclusion of his latest film. On the airplane, as he looks out beyond the clouds, he begins to think about his next film and the art of filmmaking. Upon landing, he drives through the night through thick fog, with people appearing and disappearing like apparitions.

=== Story of a Love Affair that Never Existed (Ferrara) ===
In Ferrara, Italy, Silvano meets Carmen and asks her where he can find a room for the night. She directs him to a hotel where she is staying. After checking in, Silvano sees her in the hotel restaurant and joins her. Silvano learns that Carmen is a teacher. They are attracted to each other, but they retire to their separate rooms. She undresses and waits for him, but he never comes. The next morning, he finds that she has checked out of the hotel.

Two years later in a movie theater in Ferrara, Silvano sees Carmen again and later approaches her outside. As they walk past the Castello Estense, she speaks of words that need to be spoken, but he says the only words worth speaking are hidden inside. Silvano walks Carmen to her home, where she reveals that she lived with a man for a year, and only recently he left her. "Words do us good," she tells Silvano, "even in writing. A woman expects them. She always does." Although seemingly attracted to Silvano, Carmen rebuffs his attempted kiss, and he leaves. Later he returns to her room, they undress, and he passes his hand over her skin as if unable to touch her. They move to passionately kiss, but they do not. Finally, he leaves without having sex with her. Out in the street, he looks back at her watching from a window.

=== The Girl, The Crime... (Portofino) ===
The director visits a deserted beach on a dreary day. The wind sweeps the sand across the beach. He finds an old photograph of a seaside town cradled on a hillside. In Portofino, Italy, while exploring the quaint passageways above town, the director encounters a beautiful woman and follows her to a seaside clothing shop where the woman works. In the shop, she gives him a look of recognition. They do not speak, but seem drawn to each other. As the director leaves, she gestures to him but he does not respond.

Some time later, the woman meets her friend at the Caffè Excelsior, but notices the director sitting nearby. She approaches him and confesses, "I killed my father. I stabbed him twelve times," and then walks away. The director follows and they talk about the killing that took place a year prior, for which she spent three months in jail before being acquitted. She takes him to the "scene of the crime" at the waterfront. Conflicted by her feelings for the director, she says, "You remind me of somebody." They walk to her apartment and have sex. Later, the director sits at a pool above the town contemplating the woman's story and its impact on the film he is writing.

=== Don't Try to Find Me (Paris) ===
In a Paris café, a young woman approaches a man sitting by himself. She wants to talk with someone about a magazine article she just read. The man is enchanted by the young woman's story. Three years later, the man returns home after seeing the young woman, who is by now his mistress. His wife, Patricia, confronts her husband with an ultimatum: he must choose between them. When he goes to break up with his mistress, they end up having sex. He returns home to find his wife drunk. "Everything seems ridiculous," she tells him. He assures her that he will leave his mistress, and they have sex for the first time in three years. The husband returns to his mistress who becomes jealous when she learns that he had sex with his wife. They fight, but again they end up having sex.

Meanwhile, Carlo returns to his high-rise apartment to find it empty. He gets a phone call from his wife who has just emptied the apartment of most of their belongings and left him. After a brief angry exchange she hangs up on him. Looking around the apartment he sees a picture of his wife naked that she had ripped up before leaving. Patricia arrives at the apartment which she has just rented from Carlo's wife. Patricia has just left her husband and is expecting their furniture to arrive shortly—she too has emptied her husband's home. Carlo reveals that his wife left him for her lover because he was away too often on business. Patricia then gets a phone call from her husband, and she tells him, "Don't try to find me." Carlo and Patricia approach each other and he says, "There's a cure for everything." Patricia responds, "That's what disturbs me." He kisses her hand gently.

In the French countryside, a man pulls a woman from the railroad tracks as a train passes. On the train the director considers the "limits of our brains, of our experience, of our culture, of our inspiration, of our imagination, of our sensitivity." A woman enters his compartment, gets a phone call, and says, "Don't call me again." Meanwhile, on a nearby hill, an artist is painting the very landscape the train is passing through. He explains to a woman the value of copying from the masters.

=== This Body of Filth (Aix-en-Provence) ===
In Aix-en-Provence, the director is contemplating the paintings in his hotel lobby when he notices a man entering the building across the street to deliver architectural drawings. When he reemerges, the man, Niccolo, passes a young woman in the doorway and decides to follow her. He asks if he can accompany her, and she tells him she's going to church. Niccolo is surprised that this quiet woman has little to say and seems uninterested in the world around her. She tells him that to be happy we need to eliminated pointless thoughts — that she prefers the quiet.

As they walk along the cobblestone streets, the young woman tells Niccolo that she longs to escape her body, that it needs too much and is never satisfied. Niccolo seems more interested in her body. When she does not respond to his romantic approaches, he observes that she looks like someone who is in love, like someone who is satisfied. She acknowledges that she is. When they arrive at the Church of Saint-Jean-de-Malte, the young woman enters the church, and he follows her inside. During the service, the young woman appears deeply spiritual as the choir sings. Detached and bored, Niccolo walks around like a tourist gazing up at the architecture before sitting down away from the congregation.

Later Niccolo wakes up in the now empty church following the service. He runs out into the dark streets looking for the young woman, finding her at a well. They talk about the impermanence of things. He admits that he is scared of death, and she tells him she is scared of life — the life people lead. Niccolo accompanies the young woman home, stopping in an entrance to escape the rain. Asked what would happen if he fell in love with her, she responds, "You'd be lighting a candle in a room full of light." When they reach her apartment, he asks to see her the next day. She replies simply, "Tomorrow I enter a convent." Niccolo walks out into the night and the rain.

== Cast ==
=== Wraparound ===
- John Malkovich as The Director

=== Ferrara ===
- Kim Rossi Stuart as Silvano
- Inés Sastre as Carmen

=== Portofino ===
- Sophie Marceau as The Girl
- Enrica Antonioni as Boutique Manager

=== Paris ===
- Fanny Ardant as Patricia
- Chiara Caselli as Mistress
- Peter Weller as Husband
- Jean Reno as Carlo

=== Aix-en-Provence ===
- Irène Jacob as The Girl
- Vincent Perez as Niccolo
- Marcello Mastroianni as The Man of All Vices
- Jeanne Moreau as Friend
- Veronica Lazăr as Liza

== Production ==
=== Screenplay ===
The screenplay was adapted from four sketches titled "Story of a Love Affair that Never Existed", "The Girl, The Crime ...", "Don't Try to Find Me", and "This Body of Filth", from Antonioni's book, That Bowling Alley on the Tiber. Antonioni, who was 83 at the time of the film's production, had a stroke that left him severely incapacitated. The film was completed with help from Wim Wenders, who wrote its prologue and epilogue and worked on the screenplay.

=== Filming ===
Due to ill health on the part of Antonioni, the film's producers insisted on another director, Wim Wenders, coming onboard to work as an assistant to Antonioni in case he couldn't continue. Wenders ended up directing transitional passages to fill out the film, additions that Antonioni opposed, who according to Wenders said "leave my film alone! My stories don't need any framing, they can stand by themselves." Ultimately, the Wenders sequences were left in, though the film's authorship is still credited to Antonioni.

Beyond the Clouds was filmed in the following locations:

- Ferrara, Italy
- Aix-en-Provence, Bouches-du-Rhône, France
- Portofino, Genoa, Liguria, Italy
- Paris, France

=== Editing ===
In the original edited footage (which was more than two hours long) the sex scene between Peter Weller and Chiara Caselli was longer and showed the actor performing an explicit cunnilingus to the actress. It was Wim Wenders who asked Michelangelo Antonioni to cut that part. "The scene starts off well, but becomes unbearable when it doesn't end and at the end it heavily touches the limit of pornography," Wenders said. Antonioni, for his part, cut more than half of Wenders' contributions including almost all of the scenes with Marcello Mastroianni.

=== Music ===
The film's soundtrack features compositions by Bono and Adam Clayton (of U2), Van Morrison, Laurent Petitgirard, and Lucio Dalla. The Bono/Clayton songs "Your Blue Room" and "Beach Sequence" were later featured on the album Original Soundtracks 1, credited to the shared pseudonym Passengers.

== Reception ==
=== Critical response ===
Beyond the Clouds received mixed to positive reviews with the general consensus being that fans of Antonioni's work would welcome and appreciate this as one of the director's last films; others would be less embracing of his distinctive cinematic style.

In his review in The New York Times, Stephen Holden wrote, "There are moments of such astounding visual power in Michelangelo Antonioni's film Beyond the Clouds that you are all but transported through the screen to a place where the physical and emotional weather fuse into a palpable sadness. ... More than just a great director's autumnal musings, Beyond the Clouds is a long goodbye to an idea of cinema as a high art, one that can flourish only as long as there are directors of Mr. Antonioni's vision to dream it into being."

In his review in the San Francisco Chronicle, Edward Guthmann gave the film a qualified positive review, writing, "For Antonioni lovers, who don't mind the moody silences and labyrinths of an Antonioni film and will recognize the echoes of earlier films, Beyond the Clouds won't be disappointing. A less partial audience, I'd guess, will find it slow, labored and self-conscious." Guthman sees as the dominant theme of the film "the ways in which desire distorts perception and leaves us betrayed when our wishes and reality prove incompatible. ... It's that compelling sense of mystery, of the endless search and its undercurrent of loneliness, that sets this great filmmaker apart."

In his review in the Chicago Reader, Jonathan Rosenbaum wrote, "There are a lot of beautiful things in Beyond the Clouds: the style, the settings, the bodies of young men and women-many of them beautiful in the vaguely blank way that models are."

On Rotten Tomatoes the film received a 68% rating based on 22 reviews.

=== Box office ===
The film earned $3,252,000 in gross revenue in Italy, and $31,738 in the United States. As of February 1996, the film had 230,924 admissions in France, and as of August 1996, the film had 24,951 admissions in Portugal.

=== Awards and nominations ===
Institution	Year	Category	Nominee	Result
Ciak d'Oro	1996	Best Cinematography	Alfio Contini	Nominated
Ciak d'Oro	1996	Best Editing	Claudio Di Mauro	Nominated
David di Donatello	1996	Best Cinematography	Alfio Contini	Won
Nastro d'Argento	1996	Best Director	Michelangelo Antonioni	Won
Nastro d'Argento	1996	Best Score	Lucio Dalla	Won
Nastro d'Argento	1996	Best Cinematography	Alfio Contini	Nominated
Valladolid International Film Festival	1995	Golden Spike	Michelangelo Antonioni, Wim Wenders	Nominated
Venice Film Festival	1995	FIPRESCI Prize	Michelangelo Antonioni, Wim Wenders	Won

== See also ==
- Michelangelo Antonioni filmography
- Original Soundtracks 1
