= La Notte =

1961 Italian drama film by Michelangelo Antonioni

- Theatrical release poster
- Directed by: Michelangelo Antonioni
- Written by: Michelangelo Antonioni; Ennio Flaiano; Tonino Guerra
- Produced by: Emanuele Cassuto
- Starring: Marcello Mastroianni; Jeanne Moreau; Maria Pia Luzi; Rosy Mazzacurati; Monica Vitti; Bernhard Wicki
- Cinematography: Gianni Di Venanzo
- Edited by: Eraldo Da Roma
- Music by: Giorgio Gaslini
- Production companies: Nepi Film; Sofitedip; Silver Film
- Distributed by: Dino de Laurentiis Distribuzione (Italy); Les Artistes Associés (France)
- Release dates: 24 January 1961 (Italy); 24 February 1961 (France)
- Running time: 122 minutes
- Countries: Italy; France
- Language: Italian
- Box office: ₤470 million ($752,000)

La Notte ([la ˈnɔtte]; English: "The Night") is a 1961 Italian drama film co-written and directed by Michelangelo Antonioni and starring Marcello Mastroianni, Jeanne Moreau and Monica Vitti. Filmed on location in Milan, the film depicts a single day and night in the lives of a disillusioned novelist (Mastroianni) and his alienated wife (Moreau) as they move through various social circles. The film continues Antonioni's technique of abandoning traditional storytelling in favor of visual composition, atmosphere, and mood.

Grossing 470 million lire and receiving widespread critical acclaim for its exploration of modernist themes of isolation, alienation and emotional detachment. La Notte received the Golden Bear at the 11th Berlin International Film Festival. The film also earned Antonioni the 1961 David di Donatello Award for Best Director. Although selected as the Italian entry for Best Foreign Language Film at the 34th Academy Awards, it was not nominated. La Notte is considered the central film of a trilogy called "Trilogy Of Incommunicability", beginning with L'Avventura (1960) and ending with L'Eclisse (1962). It was one of Stanley Kubrick's 10 favorite films, received 4 votes from critics and 6 votes from directors in the 2012 Sight & Sound greatest films poll, and ranked as the 52nd greatest film of all time in the 2022 director's poll with 12 votes.

== Plot ==
Writer Giovanni Pontano and his wife Lidia visit their seriously ill friend Tommaso Garani, a left-wing cultural critic, at a hospital in Milan. Giovanni's new book has just been published, and Tommaso praises his friend's work. Shaken by the sight of Tommaso in pain, Lidia leaves. Giovanni stays behind and as he leaves Tommaso's room, a sick and uninhibited young woman seduces him and they kiss. They are interrupted by the nurses, who slap the patient. Outside the hospital, Giovanni sees his wife crying but does not comfort her. As they drive off, he tells her about his "unpleasant" encounter with the sick woman and is confused when Lidia reacts with indifference.

Giovanni and Lidia attend his book launch, where he signs books while she looks on from a distance. Lidia leaves and wanders the streets of Milan, ending up in the neighborhood where she and Giovanni lived as newlyweds. She comes across a street fight which she tries to stop, and later watches rockets being set off in a field. She later calls Giovanni and he picks her up. That night, they go to a nightclub, where they watch a seductive performance by a female dancer and engage in small talk. Lidia tells Giovanni that she has something to tell him but cannot say it now, and suggests they leave the club to attend a party thrown by Mr. Gherardini, a millionaire industrialist, at his villa.

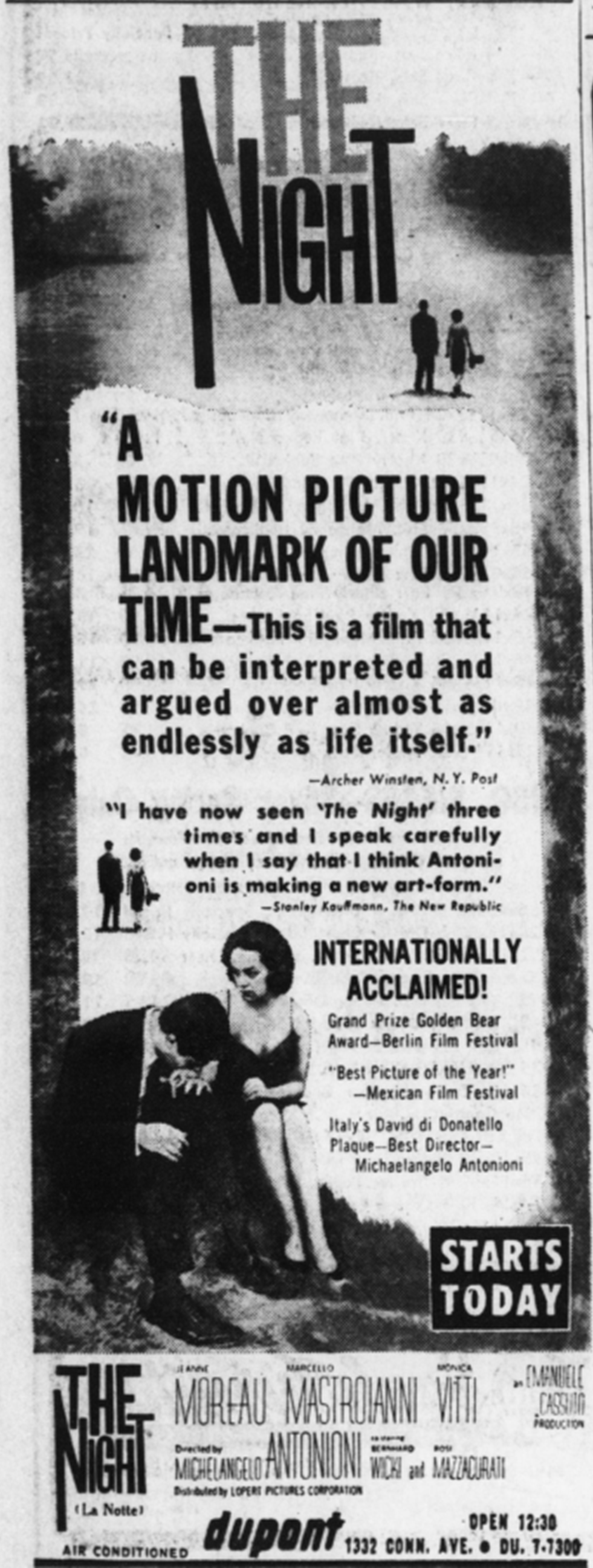
US theatrical advertisement, 1962

Giovanni socializes with the party guests while Lidia walks around in a state of boredom. Giovanni meets Valentina Gherardini, the host's young daughter. As they flirt, she slides her compact across the floor, and soon others gather to watch the two compete at this game and place bets before Giovanni bows out. Meanwhile, Lidia calls the hospital and learns that Tommaso has died, leaving her devastated. Shortly afterwards, Lidia watches from the upper floor as Giovanni kisses Valentina.

Mr. Gherardini meets privately with Giovanni and offers him an executive position with his company. Giovanni is reluctant to accept and leaves the offer open. While briefly reuniting with Lidia, Giovanni sees Valentina and follows her, leaving Lidia alone. A man named Roberto, who had been following Lidia, asks her to dance. A sudden rain shower sends the guests running for cover. As Lidia is about to jump into the pool from the diving board, Roberto takes her to his car and they drive off. She enjoys Roberto's company and their conversation but turns away from him as he tries to kiss her.

Back at the party, Giovanni searches through the crowd and finds Valentina alone. She tells him to spend the rest of the evening with his wife. She plays him a tape recording of something she has written; Giovanni praises it, but she dismisses it and erases the tape. Giovanni states that he is going through a "crisis" common among writers, but in his case, it is affecting his whole life. They return to the party just as Lidia and Roberto return from their drive. Valentina invites Lidia to dry off in her room, where Lidia confronts her directly about her husband, but they soon engage in friendly conversation. As the women chat, Giovanni overhears his wife tell Valentina that she wants to die. Noticing Giovanni, Lidia declares that she feels no jealousy towards Valentina. Giovanni and Lidia leave the party at dawn.

As Giovanni and Lidia walk away across Mr. Gherardini's private golf course, Lidia informs Giovanni of Tommaso's death. She recounts how Tommaso used to support her and offer his affections to her, but she eventually chose to be with Giovanni because she loved him. She then explains that she feels like dying because she no longer loves Giovanni. He acknowledges the failure of their marriage but reaffirms his love for her. Lidia takes out a love letter Giovanni wrote to her before they married and reads it aloud. Giovanni embraces and kisses her, but she resists, insisting that they no longer love each other. Giovanni continues to kiss and fondle Lidia in a bunker on the golf course.

== Cast ==
- Marcello Mastroianni as Giovanni Pontano
- Jeanne Moreau as Lidia Pontano
- Monica Vitti as Valentina Gherardini
- Bernhard Wicki as Tommaso Garani
- Rosy Mazzacurati as Resy
- Maria Pia Luzi as the hospital patient
- Guido Ajmone Marsan as Mr. Fanti
- Vincenzo Corbella as Mr. Gherardini
- Ugo Fortunati as Cesarino
- Gitt Magrini as Mrs. Gherardini
- Giorgio Negro (Note: Actually Gaetano "Tanino" Negroni, a Roman eye surgeon) as Roberto
- Roberta Speroni as Berenice

== Production ==
=== Filming locations ===
- 4 Via Lanzone, Milan (the hospital)
- 20 Via Gustavo Fara, Milan (Giovanni and Lidia's apartment)
- Barlassina Country Club (Gherardini villa)
- Sesto San Giovanni, Lombardy

== Release ==
=== Censorship ===
When La Notte was first released in Italy in 1960, the Committee for the Theatrical Review of the Italian Ministry of Cultural Heritage and Activities rated it as VM16: not suitable for children under 16. In addition, the committee made the following censorship recommendations: 1) the scene at the hospital with Mastroianni and the young lady must end at the moment when the two start to kiss each other; 2) the scene in the dressing room in which it is possible to see the naked breasts of Moreau; 3) the word "whore", said by one of the two ladies walking in the park, must be removed; 4) the final scene in which Mastroianni and Moreau hug each other and start rolling down the grass, the scene can resume when the panning shot shows the landscape without displaying the two actors. Document N° 33395 was signed on 2 November 1960 by Minister Renzo Helfer.

== Reception ==
=== Box office ===
La Notte grossed 470 million lire ($752,000) in Italy during its initial release in Italy.

=== Critical response ===
On the review aggregator website Rotten Tomatoes, the film holds an approval rating of 84% based on 31 reviews, with an average rating of 7.6/10.

In his review in The New York Times, Bosley Crowther wrote: "As in L'Avventura, it is not the situation so much as it is the intimations of personal feelings, doubts and moods that are the substance of the film". Crowther praises Antonioni's ability to develop his drama "with a skill that is excitingly fertile, subtle and awesomely intuitive".

Too sensitive and subtle for apt description are his pictorial fashionings of a social atmosphere, a rarefied intellectual climate, a psychologically stultifying milieu—and his haunting evocations within them of individual symbolisms and displays of mental and emotional aberrations. Even boredom is made interesting by him. There is, for instance, a sequence in which a sudden downpour turns a listless garden party into a riot of foolish revelry, exposing the lack of stimulation before nature takes a flagellating hand. Or there's a shot of the crumpled wife leaning against a glass wall looking out into the rain that tells in a flash of all her ennui, desolation and despair.

Stanley Kubrick listed La Notte as one of his top 10 favorite films.

=== Accolades ===
La Notte was selected as the Italian entry for the Academy Award for Best Foreign Language Film at the 34th Academy Awards, but was not accepted as a nominee.

Award	Year	Category	Recipient(s)	Result
Berlin International Film Festival	1961	Golden Bear	Michelangelo Antonioni	Won
David di Donatello	1961	Best Director	Michelangelo Antonioni	Won
Jussi Awards	1962	Foreign Actress	Jeanne Moreau	Won
Nastro d'Argento	1962	Best Director	Michelangelo Antonioni	Won
Nastro d'Argento	1962	Best Supporting Actress	Monica Vitti	Won
Nastro d'Argento	1962	Best Score	Giorgio Gaslini	Won

== Cultural references ==
- Monty Python referred to the film in the subtitles of the original 1974 trailer for Monty Python and the Holy Grail and in the end credits of Monty Python's Life of Brian, which ask: "If you have enjoyed this film, why not go and see La notte?"
- In the 2008 Mad Men episode "The New Girl" (season 2, episode 5), Don Draper mentions that he likes La Notte.
- Norwegian jazz pianist Ketil Bjørnstad's 2013 album La Notte took its title and cover art from the film.

== See also ==
- Michelangelo Antonioni filmography
- List of submissions to the 34th Academy Awards for Best Foreign Language Film
- List of Italian submissions for the Academy Award for Best Foreign Language Film
