= Red Desert (film) =

1964 film by Michelangelo Antonioni

- Italian theatrical release poster
- Italian: Il deserto rosso
- Directed by: Michelangelo Antonioni
- Written by: Michelangelo Antonioni; Tonino Guerra
- Produced by: Antonio Cervi
- Starring: Monica Vitti; Richard Harris; Carlo Chionetti; Xenia Valderi; Rita Renoir; Aldo Grotti
- Cinematography: Carlo Di Palma
- Edited by: Eraldo Da Roma
- Music by: Giovanni Fusco; Vittorio Gelmetti
- Production companies: Film Duemila; Francoriz Distribution
- Distributed by: Cineriz (Italy); Carlotta Films (France)
- Release dates: 7 September 1964 (Venice); 29 October 1964 (Italy and France)
- Running time: 120 minutes
- Countries: Italy; France
- Language: Italian

Red Desert (Italian: Il deserto rosso) is a 1964 psychological drama film directed by Michelangelo Antonioni, written by Antonioni and Tonino Guerra, and starring Monica Vitti and Richard Harris. Set in Northern Italy, the story follows a troubled woman who is unable to adapt to her environment after an automobile accident. This was Antonioni's first color film.

This was the last in a series of four films he made with Vitti between 1959 and 1964, preceded by L'Avventura (1960), La Notte (1961), and L'Eclisse (1962). Red Desert was awarded the Golden Lion at the 25th Venice International Film Festival in 1964. It has received acclaim from critics.

== Plot ==
In Ravenna, Giuliana is walking with her young son, Valerio, towards the petrochemical plant managed by her husband, Ugo. Passing workers who are on strike, Giuliana nervously and impulsively buys a half-eaten sandwich from one of the workers. They are surrounded by strange industrial structures and debris that create inhuman images and sounds. Inside the plant, Ugo is speaking with a visiting business associate, Corrado, who is looking to recruit workers for an industrial operation in Patagonia, Argentina. Ugo and Corrado converse comfortably in the noisy factory when Giuliana arrives. Ugo introduces Corrado to Giuliana who departs to wait in Ugo's office.

Ugo later tells Corrado that his wife had a recent auto accident, and though she was physically unharmed, she has been mentally unwell. That night in their apartment, Giuliana becomes highly agitated and fearful over a dream she had about sinking into quicksand. Ugo is unable to calm her or understand what she is experiencing.

Corrado visits Giuliana at an empty shop she is planning to open and discusses his life and the restless nature of his existence. She accompanies him to Ferrara on one of his worker recruitment drives, and she indirectly reveals details about her mental state. She tells him that when she was in the hospital, she met a young female patient who was advised by her doctors to find someone or something to love. She speaks of the young woman feeling like there was "no ground beneath her, like she was sliding down a slope, sinking, always on the verge of drowning." They travel to a radio observatory in Medicina, where Corrado hopes to recruit a top worker. Surrounded by cold industrial architecture, Giuliana seems lost in her loneliness and isolation.

The following weekend, Giuliana, Ugo, and Corrado are walking beside a polluted estuary when they meet with another couple, Max and Linda, and together they drive to a small riverside shack at Porto Corsini where they meet Emilia. There, they engage in trivial small talk filled with jokes, role-playing, and sexual innuendo. Giuliana seems to find temporary solace in these mindless distractions. In a dense fog, a mysterious ship docks directly outside their shack. During their conversations, Corrado and Giuliana have grown closer, and he shows interest and sympathy for her. When a doctor arrives to board the ship, Giuliana, seeing that the ship is now quarantined because of an infectious disease, rushes off in a state of panic, nearly driving off the pier.

Some time later, Ugo leaves on a business trip, and Giuliana spends more time with Corrado, revealing more about her anxieties. One day, Valerio becomes suddenly paralyzed from the waist down. Fearing he has contracted polio, Giuliana tries to comfort the boy with a story about a young girl who lives on an island and swims off a beach at an isolated cove. The girl is at home with her surroundings, but after a mysterious sailing ship approaches offshore, all the rocks of the cove seem to come alive and sing to her in one voice. Soon afterwards, Giuliana discovers that Valerio was only pretending to be paralyzed. Unable to imagine why her son would do such a cruel thing, Giuliana's sense of loneliness and isolation returns.

Desperate to end her inner turmoil, Giuliana goes to Corrado's room. Giuliana is distraught and begins to disrobe. Initially she resists Corrado's advances, but they eventually have sex. The intimacy, however, does little to relieve Giuliana's sense of isolation. Corrado drives Giuliana to her empty shop, where she remarks that there is something "terrible" about reality. Later, Giuliana wanders to a dockside ship where she meets a Turkish sailor and asks if the ship takes passengers. She tries to communicate her feelings to him, but he cannot understand her words. Acknowledging the reality of her isolation, she says, "We are all separate."

Later in the daytime, Giuliana is walking with her son near Ugo's plant. Valerio notices a nearby smokestack emitting poisonous yellow smoke and wonders if birds are being killed by the toxic emissions. Giuliana tells him that the birds have learned not to fly near the smoke. The two then walk away.

== Cast ==
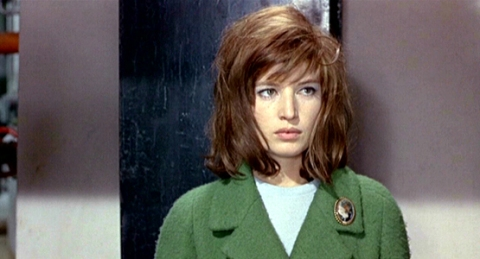
Monica Vitti in Red Desert

- Monica Vitti as Giuliana
- Richard Harris as Corrado Zeller
- Carlo Chionetti as Ugo
- Xenia Valderi as Linda
- Rita Renoir as Emilia
- Lili Rheims as Chiara
- Aldo Grotti as Max
- Valerio Bartoleschi as Valerio
- Emanuela Paola Carboni as girl in fable
- Giuliano Missirini as Mario

== Themes ==
Screenshot from the film: "My intention..." said Antonioni, "was to translate the poetry of the world, in which even factories can be beautiful."

Antonioni dismissed simple interpretations of the film as a condemnation of industrialism, saying:

It's too simplistic to say—as many people have done—that I am condemning the inhuman industrial world which oppresses the individuals and leads them to neurosis. My intention ... was to translate the poetry of the world, in which even factories can be beautiful. The line and curves of factories and their chimneys can be more beautiful than the outline of trees, which we are already too accustomed to seeing. It is a rich world, alive and serviceable ... The neurosis I sought to describe in Red Desert is above all a matter of adjusting. There are people who do adapt, and others who can't manage, perhaps because they are too tied to ways of life that are by now out-of-date.

== Production ==
=== Background ===
The working title of the film was Celeste e verde (Sky blue and green).

The film is set in the industrial area of 1960s Ravenna with sprawling new post World War Two factories, industrial machinery and a much polluted river valley. The cinematography is highlighted by pastel colors with flowing white smoke and fog. The sound design blends a foley of industrial and urban sounds with ghostly ship horns and an abstract electronic music score by Gelmetti. This was Antonioni's first colour film, which the director said he wanted to shoot like a painting on a canvas:

I want to paint the film as one paints the canvas; I want to invent the colour relationships, and not limit myself to photographing only natural colours.

As he would do in later film productions, Antonioni went to great lengths in reaching this goal, such as having trees and grass painted white or grey to fit his take on an urban landscape. Andrew Sarris called the red hued pipes and railings "the architecture of anxiety: the reds and blues exclaim as much as they explain".

Another of Red Desert's innovations is extensive use of the telephoto and zoom lenses, even in shots where the actor stands relatively close to the camera. Antonioni wrote, "I worked a lot in Il deserto rosso with the zoom lens to try and get two dimensional effect, to diminish the distance between people and objects, make them seem flattened against each other. Such flattening contributes to the sense of psychological oppression: Giuliana in several shots seems pinned against the wall and the bars between couples seem part of their body."

=== Filming ===
Shooting took place primarily on-location in Ravenna, with studio sequences at De Paolis Studios in Rome. The "fable" sequence was filmed on the isle of Sardinia and nearby Budelli, utilizing the distinctive pink-sand beach of the latter.

In his autobiography, David Hemmings claimed that Richard Harris repeatedly clashed with Antonioni during filming (apparently over Antonioni's lack of English fluency and oblique direction), culminating in a physical altercation that led him to be fired. His scenes had to be finished by a body double. At another occasion, Harris took LSD for the first time and was caught climbing into the Trevi Fountain.

== Critical reception ==
In 1965, a reviewer for Time lauded Red Desert as "at once the most beautiful, the most simple and the most daring film yet made by" Antonioni, and stated that the director "shows a painterly approach to each frame". In 1990, Jonathan Rosenbaum praised the director's "eerie, memorable work with the industrial shapes and colors that surround [Giuliana]; she walks through a science fiction landscape dotted with structures that are both disorienting and full of possibilities." In The Daily Telegraph in 2012, Robbie Collin wrote that Antonioni's "bold, modernist angles and thrillingly innovative use of colour (he painted trees and grass to tone with the industrial landscape) make every frame a work of art". Richard Brody of The New Yorker viewed the approach to color as "greatly responsible for the film's emotional and intellectual power" and argued, "The characters in his movies seem thin because their environment is developed so thickly; yet that environment, he suggests, is, though exterior to them, an inextricable part of them."

The Japanese filmmaker Akira Kurosawa cited Red Desert as one of his favorite films. Conversely, Andrei Tarkovsky criticized Antonioni for "[getting] high on pictorial aesthetics" and believed his jump to color was detrimental to his direction.

On the review aggregator website Rotten Tomatoes, 94% of 31 critics' reviews are positive, with an average rating of 9.1/10. The website's consensus reads: "Michelangelo Antonioni embraces color for the first time in Red Desert, deploying a searing palette and Monica Vitti's exquisite performance to tell a curious tale of unquenchable desire."

== See also ==
- Michelangelo Antonioni filmography
