= Michelangelo Antonioni =

Italian filmmaker (1912–2007)

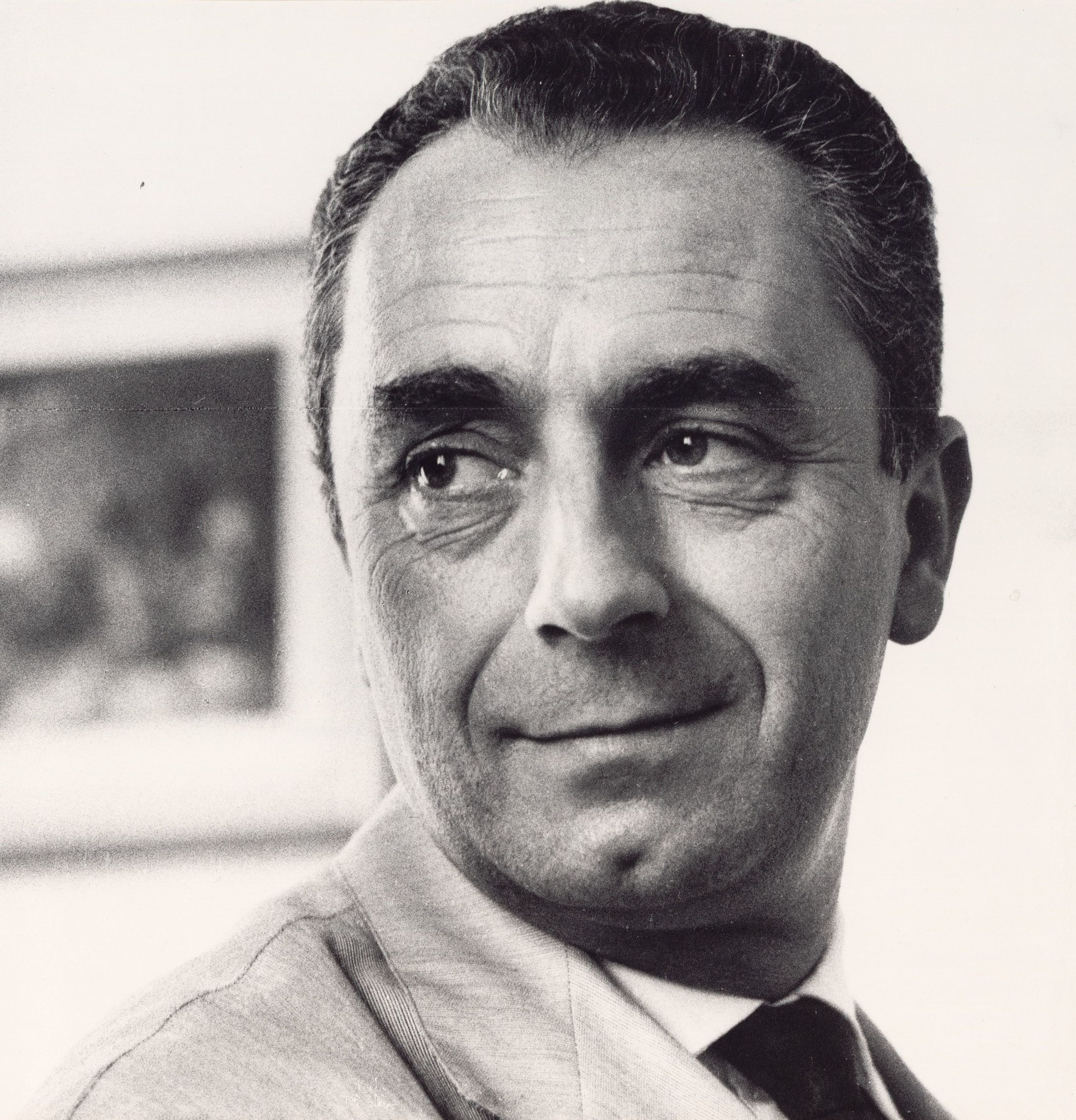
- Born: 29 September 1912; Ferrara, Kingdom of Italy
- Died: 30 July 2007 (aged 94); Rome, Italy
- Education: University of Bologna; Centro Sperimentale di Cinematografia (withdrew)
- Occupations: Film director; screenwriter; film editor; author
- Years active: 1942–2004
- Notable work: Filmography
- Spouses: Letizia Balboni (m. 1942; div. 1954) Enrica Fico (m. 1986)
- Partner: Monica Vitti (1960–1970)

Michelangelo Antonioni (/ˌæntoʊniˈoʊni/ AHN-toh-NYOH-nee or /ænˌtoʊ-/ an-TOH-; Italian: [mikeˈlandʒelo antoˈnjoːni]; 29 September 1912 – 30 July 2007) was an Italian film director, screenwriter, and editor. He is best known for a trio of films often dubbed the "alienation trilogy": L'Avventura (1960), La Notte (1961), and L'Eclisse (1962); the English-language film Blowup (1966); and the multilingual The Passenger (1975). His films have been described as "enigmatic and intricate mood pieces" that feature striking visual composition, subdued narratives, and a preoccupation with modern landscapes. His work substantially influenced subsequent world art cinema, including the slow cinema movement.

Antonioni received numerous awards and nominations throughout his career, being the first and one of two directors, the other being Jafar Panahi, to have won the Palme d'Or, the Golden Lion, the Golden Bear and the Golden Leopard. Three of his films are on the list of hundred Italian films to be saved. He received Academy Award nominations for Best Director and Best Original Screenplay for Blowup. In 1995, he received an Honorary Oscar "in recognition of his place as one of cinema's master visual stylists".

== Early life ==
Antonioni was born into a prosperous family of landowners in Ferrara, Emilia-Romagna. He was the son of Elisabetta (née Roncagli) and Ismaele Antonioni. The director explained to Italian film critic Aldo Tassone:

My childhood was a happy one. My mother... was a warm and intelligent woman who had been a labourer in her youth. My father also was a good man. Born into a working-class family, he succeeded in obtaining a comfortable position through evening courses and hard work. My parents gave me free rein to do what I wanted: with my brother, we spent most of our time playing outside with friends. Curiously enough, our friends were invariably proletarian and poor. The poor still existed at that time, you recognized them by their clothes. But even in the way they wore their clothes, there was a fantasy, a frankness that made me prefer them to boys of bourgeois families. I always had sympathy for young women of working-class families, even later when I attended university: they were more authentic and spontaneous.

— Michelangelo Antonioni

As a child, Antonioni was fond of drawing and music. A precocious violinist, he gave his first concert at the age of nine. Although he abandoned the violin with the discovery of cinema in his teens, drawing would remain a lifelong passion. "I have never drawn, even as a child, either puppets or silhouettes but rather facades of houses and gates. One of my favourite games consisted of organizing towns. Ignorant in architecture, I constructed buildings and streets crammed with little figures. I invented stories for them. These childhood happenings—I was eleven years old—were like little films."

Upon graduation from the University of Bologna with a degree in economics, he started writing for the Ferrara newspaper Il Corriere Padano in 1935 as a film journalist.

In 1940, Antonioni moved to Rome, where he worked for Cinema, the official Fascist film magazine edited by Vittorio Mussolini. However, Antonioni was fired a few months afterwards. Later that year, he enrolled at the Centro Sperimentale di Cinematografia to study film technique but left after three months. He was subsequently drafted into the army, and survived being condemned to death as a member of the Italian Resistance.

== Career ==
=== Early film work ===
In 1942, Antonioni co-wrote A Pilot Returns with Roberto Rossellini and worked as assistant director on Enrico Fulchignoni's I due Foscari. In 1943, he travelled to France to assist Marcel Carné on Les visiteurs du soir and began a series of short films with Gente del Po (1943), a story of poor fishermen of the Po valley. When Rome was liberated by the Allies, the film stock was transferred to the Fascist "Republic of Salò" and could not be recovered and edited until 1947. The complete footage was never retrieved. These films were neorealist semi-documentary studies of the lives of working-class people.

However, Antonioni's first feature Cronaca di un amore (Story of a Love Affair, 1950) broke away from neorealism by depicting the middle classes. He continued to do so in a series of other films: I vinti (The Vanquished, 1952), a trio of stories, each set in a different country (France, Italy and England), about juvenile delinquency; La signora senza camelie (The Lady Without Camellias, 1953) about a young film star and her fall from grace; and Le Amiche (The Girlfriends, 1955) about middle-class women in Turin. Il Grido (The Outcry, 1957) was a return to working-class stories, depicting a factory worker and his daughter. Each of these stories is about social alienation.

=== International recognition ===
In Le Amiche (1955), Antonioni experimented with a radical new style: instead of a conventional narrative, he presented a series of apparently disconnected events, and used long takes as part of his style. Antonioni returned to their use in L'avventura (1960), which became his first international success. At the 1960 Cannes Film Festival it received a mixture of cheers and boos, but won a Jury Prize and became popular in arthouse cinemas around the world. La notte (1961), starring Jeanne Moreau and Marcello Mastroianni, and L'Eclisse (1962), starring Alain Delon and Monica Vitti, followed L'avventura. These three films are often referred to as a trilogy. La notte won the Golden Bear at the 11th Berlin International Film Festival, His first color film, Il deserto rosso (The Red Desert, 1964), deals with similar themes, and is sometimes considered the fourth film of the "trilogy". All four films featured Vitti, his romantic partner at the time.

Antonioni then signed a deal with producer Carlo Ponti that would allow artistic freedom on three films in English to be released by MGM. The first of these, Blowup (1966), was an international critical and commercial success and won the Palme d'Or at the 1967 Cannes Film Festival. Set in Swinging London, the film starred David Hemmings as a fashion photographer and was loosely based on a short story by Argentine-French writer Julio Cortázar. The second, Zabriskie Point (1970), was set in America and followed the counterculture. The soundtrack featured music from Pink Floyd, the Grateful Dead and the Rolling Stones. However, Zabriskie Point itself was a critical and commercial failure, and has been called "the worst film ever made by a director of genius". The third film, The Passenger (1975), starring Jack Nicholson and Maria Schneider, received critical praise but did poorly at the box office.

In 1966, Antonioni drafted a treatment titled "Technically Sweet", which he later developed into a screenplay with Mark Peploe, Niccolo Tucci, and Tonino Guerra, with plans to begin filming in the early 1970s with Jack Nicholson and Maria Schneider. On the verge of production in the Amazon jungle Ponti suddenly withdrew support and the project was abandoned, with Nicholson and Schneider going forward to star in The Passenger. In 2008, "Technically Sweet" became an international group exhibition curated by Copenhagen-based artists Yvette Brackman and Maria Finn, in which the creations of artists, working in multiple mediums and based on Antonioni's manuscript, were displayed in New York. One of these was the short film Sweet Ruin, directed by Elisabeth Subrin and starring Gaby Hoffmann. Antonioni's widow Enrica and director André Ristum announced plans to produce a film based on the screenplay, with filming in Brazil and Sardinia to begin in 2023.

In 1972, Antonioni was invited to China to film the achievements of the Cultural Revolution. The resulting documentary, Chung Kuo, Cina, was strongly condemned by the Chinese authorities as "anti-Chinese" and "anti-communist". It was first shown in China on 25 November 2004 in Beijing, with a film festival hosted by the Beijing Film Academy to honour the works of Antonioni. The film is now well-regarded by Chinese audiences, particularly by people who lived during the Cultural Revolution.

=== Later career ===
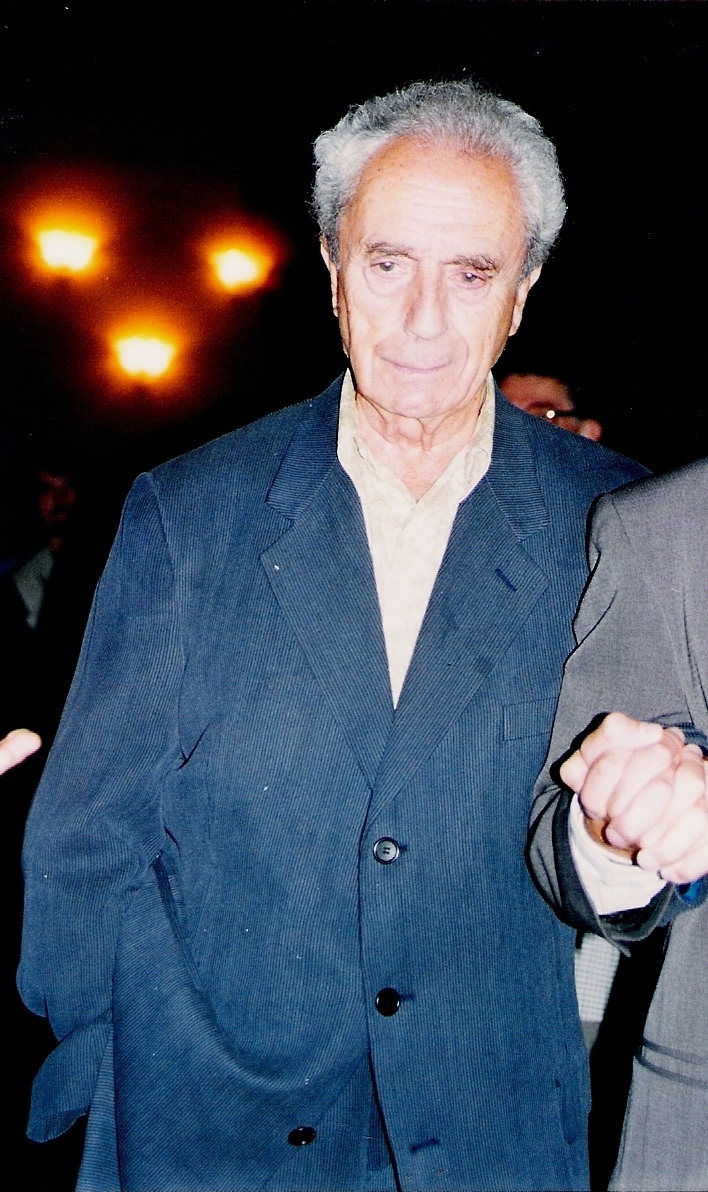
Antonioni in the 2000s

In 1980, Antonioni directed Il mistero di Oberwald (The Mystery of Oberwald), based on Jean Cocteau's play, L'Aigle à deux têtes (The Eagle With Two Heads). Featuring Monica Vitti in the lead, the film delves into an experimental approach to color enhancement through electronic treatment. The process involves initially capturing the footage on video and transferring it to 35mm film stock during post-production.

Identificazione di una donna ("Identification of a Woman"), a 1982 film shot in Italy, explores the recurring themes found in his Italian trilogy. In 1983, Antonioni published the book That Bowling Alley on the Tiber, which contains sketch stories and musings he described as "nuclei" for possible films. In 1985, Antonioni suffered a stroke that left him aphasic and partly paralyzed. Despite his incapacity to speak or write, Antonioni continued to direct films including Beyond the Clouds (1995), based on four stories from That Bowling Alley on the Tiber, for which Wim Wenders was hired as a back-up director to shoot various scenes. (Wenders has explained that "without someone else, no film of his would find insurers.") During the editing, however, Antonioni rejected almost all of the material filmed by Wenders except for a few short interludes. They shared the FIPRESCI Prize at the Venice Film Festival with Cyclo.

In 1994, he was given an Honorary Academy Award "in recognition of his place as one of cinema's master visual stylists". Presented to him by Jack Nicholson, the statuette was later stolen by burglars and had to be replaced. Previously, Antonioni had received Academy Award nominations for Best Director and Best Screenplay for Blowup (1967).

Antonioni's final film, directed when he was in his 90s, was a segment of the anthology film Eros (2004), entitled Il filo pericoloso delle cose (The Dangerous Thread of Things). The short film's episodes are framed using a series of enigmatic paintings by Antonioni, a luxury sports car that has difficulty negotiating the narrow lanes and archaic stone bridges of the provincial town setting, a bikini-clad women performing a cryptic choreography on a beach, and the song "Michelangelo Antonioni", composed and sung by Caetano Veloso. The film was not well-received internationally. In America, Roger Ebert claimed it was neither erotic nor about eroticism. The U.S. DVD release of the film includes another 2004 short film by Antonioni, Lo sguardo di Michelangelo (The Gaze of Michelangelo).

Antonioni died in Rome, aged 94, on 30 July 2007 (the same day that saw the death of renowned Swedish director Ingmar Bergman). He lay in state at City Hall in Rome, where a large screen showed black-and-white footage of him among his film sets and behind the scenes. He was buried in his hometown of Ferrara on 2 August 2007.

== Style and themes ==
It's too simplistic to say—as many people have done—that I am condemning the inhuman industrial world which oppresses the individuals and leads them to neurosis. My intention ... was to translate the poetry of the world, in which even factories can be beautiful. The line and curves of factories and their chimneys can be more beautiful than the outline of trees, which we are already too accustomed to seeing. It is a rich world, alive and serviceable ... There are people who do adapt, and others who can't manage, perhaps because they are too tied to ways of life that are by now out-of-date.

— Antonioni, interviewed about Red Desert (1964).

Critic Richard Brody described Antonioni as "the cinema's exemplary modernist" and one of its "great pictorialists—his images reflect, with a cold enticement, the abstractions that fascinated him." AllMovie stated that "his films—a seminal body of enigmatic and intricate mood pieces—rejected action in favor of contemplation, championing image and design over character and story." Stephen Dalton of the British Film Institute described Antonioni's influential visual hallmarks as "extremely long takes, striking modern architecture, painterly use of colour, [and] tiny human figures adrift in empty landscapes," noting similarities to the "empty urban dreamscapes" of surrealist painter Giorgio de Chirico. Film historian Virginia Wright Wexman notes the slowness of his camera and the absence of frequent cuts, stating that "he forces our full attention by continuing the shot long after others would cut away." Antonioni is also noted for exploiting colour as a significant expressive element in his later works, especially in Il deserto rosso, his first colour film.

Antonioni's plots were experimental, ambiguous, and elusive, often featuring middle-class characters who suffer from ennui, desperation, or joyless sex. Film historian David Bordwell writes that in Antonioni's films, "Vacations, parties and artistic pursuits are vain efforts to conceal the characters' lack of purpose and emotion. Sexuality is reduced to casual seduction, enterprise to the pursuit of wealth at any cost." The New Yorker wrote that "Antonioni captured a new bourgeois society that shifted from physical to intellectual creation, from matter to abstraction, from things to images, and the crisis of personal identity and self-recognition that resulted," calling his 1960s collaborations with Monica Vitti "a crucial moment in the creation of cinematic modernism." Richard Brody stated that his films explore "the way that new methods of communication—mainly the mass media, but also the abstractions of high-tech industry, architecture, music, politics, and even fashion—have a feedback effect on the educated, white-collar thinkers who create them," but noted that "he wasn't nostalgic about the premodern."

Wexman describes Antonioni's perspective on the world as that of a "postreligious Marxist and existentialist intellectual." In a speech at Cannes about L'Avventura, Antonioni said that in the modern age of reason and science, mankind still lives by

"a rigid and stereotyped morality which all of us recognize as such and yet sustain out of cowardice and sheer laziness [...] We have examined those moral attitudes very carefully, we have dissected them and analyzed them to the point of exhaustion. We have been capable of all this, but we have not been capable of finding new ones."

Nine years later he expressed a similar attitude in an interview, saying that he loathed the word 'morality': "When man becomes reconciled to nature, when space becomes his true background, these words and concepts will have lost their meaning, and we will no longer have to use them." Critic Roland Barthes claimed that Antonioni's approach "is not that of a historian, a politician or a moralist, but rather that of a utopian whose perception is seeking to pinpoint the new world, because he is eager for this world and already wants to be part of it." He added that his art "consists in always leaving the road of meaning open and as if undecided."

== Reception and legacy ==
Bordwell explains that Antonioni was extremely influential on art films: "More than any other director, he encouraged filmmakers to explore elliptical and open-ended narrative." The Guardian described him as, "in essence, a director of extraordinary sequences," and advised viewers to "forget plotting, characters or dialogue, his import is conveyed in absolutely formal terms."

Film director Akira Kurosawa considered Antonioni one of the most interesting filmmakers. Stanley Kubrick listed La Notte as one of his ten favorite films in a 1963 Poll. Andrei Tarkovsky was deeply influenced by Antonioni, especially for the development of his film Nostalghia. In an interview with Serge Kaganski in 2004, Jean-Luc Godard judges that Antonioni is the filmmaker who has most influenced contemporary cinema. Wim Wenders considered Antonioni as a master and the two collaborated as directors for the film Beyond the Clouds. Miklós Jancsó considers Antonioni as his master. American director Martin Scorsese paid tribute to Antonioni following his death in 2007, stating that his films "posed mysteries—or rather the mystery, of who we are, what we are, to each other, to ourselves, to time. You could say that Antonioni was looking directly at the mysteries of the soul." American directors Francis Ford Coppola and Brian De Palma paid homage to Antonioni in their own films.

Antonioni's spare style and purposeless characters, however, have not received universal acclaim. Ingmar Bergman stated in 2002 that while he considered the Antonioni films Blowup and La notte masterpieces, he found the other films boring and noted that he had never understood why Antonioni was held in such esteem. Orson Welles regretted the Italian director's use of the long take: "I don't like to dwell on things. It's one of the reasons I'm so bored with Antonioni—the belief that, because a shot is good, it's going to get better if you keep looking at it. He gives you a full shot of somebody walking down a road. And you think, 'Well, he's not going to carry that woman all the way up that road.' But he does. And then she leaves and you go on looking at the road after she's gone."

American actor Peter Weller, whom Antonioni directed in Beyond the Clouds, explained in a 1996 interview: "There is no director living except maybe Kurosawa, Bergman, or Antonioni that I would fall down and do anything for. I met Antonioni three years ago in Taormina at a film festival. I introduced myself and told him that I adored his movies, his contributions to film, because he was the first guy who really started making films about the reality of the vacuity between people, the difficulty in traversing this space between lovers in modern day ... and he never gives you an answer, Antonioni—that's the beautiful thing."

== Filmography ==
=== Feature films ===
Year	English title	Original title
1950	Story of a Love Affair	Cronaca di un amore
1953	The Vanquished	I Vinti
1953	The Lady Without Camelias	La signora senza camelie
1955	The Girl Friends	Le Amiche
1957	The Cry	Il Grido
1960	The Adventure	L'Avventura
1961	The Night	La Notte
1962	The Eclipse	L'Eclisse
1964	Red Desert	Il Deserto Rosso
1966	Blowup	
1970	Zabriskie Point	
1972	Chung Kuo, Cina	documentary
1975	The Passenger	Professione: Reporter
1980	The Mystery of Oberwald	Il mistero di Oberwald
1982	Identification of a Woman	Identificazione di una donna
1995	Beyond the Clouds	Al di là delle nuvole

== Awards and honors ==
- Academy Honorary Award (1995)
- Berlin International Film Festival FIPRESCI Prize (1961)
- Berlin International Film Festival Golden Bear (1961), for La Notte
- Bodil Award for Best European Film (1976), for The Passenger
- British Film Institute Sutherland Trophy (1960), for L'Avventura
- Cannes Film Festival Jury Prize (1960), for L'Avventura
- Cannes Film Festival Jury Prize (1962), for Eclipse
- Cannes Film Festival Palme d'Or (1967), for Blowup
- Cannes Film Festival 35th Anniversary Prize (1982), for Identification of a Woman
- David di Donatello Award for Best Director (1961), for La Notte
- David di Donatello Luchino Visconti Award (1976)
- European Film Awards Life Achievement Award (1993)
- Cairo International Film Festival Life Achievement Award (2000)
- Flaiano Prize Career Award in Cinema (2000)
- French Syndicate of Cinema Critics Award for Best Foreign Film (1968), for Blowup
- Giffoni Film Festival François Truffaut Award (1991)
- Giffoni Film Festival Golden Career Gryphon (1995)
- International Istanbul Film Festival Lifetime Achievement Award (1996)
- Italian National Syndicate of Film Journalists Silver Ribbon for Best Documentary (1948), for N.U.
- Italian National Syndicate of Film Journalists Silver Ribbon for Best Documentary (1950), for Lies of Love
- Italian National Syndicate of Film Journalists Special Silver Ribbon (1951), for Story of a Love Affair
- Italian National Syndicate of Film Journalists Silver Ribbon for Best Director (1956), for Le Amiche
- Italian National Syndicate of Film Journalists Silver Ribbon for Best Director (1962), for La Notte
- Italian National Syndicate of Film Journalists Silver Ribbon for Best foreign film Director (1968), for Blow up
- Italian National Syndicate of Film Journalists Silver Ribbon for Best Director (1976), for The Passenger
- Kansas City Film Critics Circle Award for Best Director (1968), for Blowup
- Locarno International Film Festival Prize (1957), for Il Grido
- Montreal World Film Festival Grand Prix Special des Amériques (1995)
- National Society of Film Critics Special Citation Award (2001)
- National Society of Film Critics Award for Best Director (2001), for Blowup
- Palm Springs International Film Festival Lifetime Achievement Award (1998)
- Valladolid International Film Festival FIPRESCI Prize for Short Film (2004), for Michelangelo Eye to Eye
- Venice Film Festival Silver Lion (1955), for Le Amiche
- Venice Film Festival FIPRESCI Prize (1964), for Red Desert
- Venice Film Festival Golden Lion (1964), for Red Desert
- Venice Film Festival Career Golden Lion (1983)
- Venice Film Festival FIPRESCI Prize (1995), for Beyond the Clouds (with Wim Wenders)
- Venice Film Festival Pietro Bianchi Award (1998)

== See also ==
- Michelangelo Antonioni filmography
- List of Italian Academy Award winners and nominees
- List of atheists in film, radio, television and theater
