= L'Avventura =

1960 film by Michelangelo Antonioni

- Theatrical release poster
- Directed by: Michelangelo Antonioni
- Screenplay by: Michelangelo Antonioni; Elio Bartolini; Tonino Guerra
- Story by: Michelangelo Antonioni
- Produced by: Amato Pennasilico
- Starring: Gabriele Ferzetti; Monica Vitti; Lea Massari; Dominique Blanchar; Renzo Ricci; Lelio Luttazzi; James Addams; Dorothy de Poliolo; Giovanni Petrucci; Esmeralda Ruspoli
- Cinematography: Aldo Scavarda
- Edited by: Eraldo Da Roma
- Music by: Giovanni Fusco
- Production companies: Cino Del Duca; Produzioni Cinematografiche Europee; Société Cinématographique Lyre
- Distributed by: Cino Del Duca (Italy); Athos Films (France)
- Release dates: 15 May 1960 (Cannes); 14 September 1960 (France); 29 September 1960 (Italy)
- Running time: 143 minutes
- Countries: Italy; France
- Language: Italian

L'Avventura (Italian: [lavvenˈtura]; lit. 'The adventure') is a 1960 drama film directed by Michelangelo Antonioni. Developed from a story by Antonioni with co-writers Elio Bartolini and Tonino Guerra, the film is about the disappearance of a young woman (Lea Massari) during a boating trip in the Mediterranean, and the subsequent search for her by her lover (Gabriele Ferzetti) and her best friend (Monica Vitti). It was filmed on location in Rome, the Aeolian Islands, and Sicily in 1959 under difficult financial and physical conditions. The film is noted for its unusual pacing, which emphasizes visual composition, mood, and character over traditional narrative development.

L'Avventura was nominated for numerous awards and was awarded the Jury Prize at the 1960 Cannes Film Festival. The film made Vitti an international star. According to an Antonioni obituary, the film "systematically subverted the filmic codes, practices and structures in currency at its time". L'Avventura is the first film of a trilogy by Antonioni, followed by La Notte (1961) and L'Eclisse (1962). (Note: The form of the "trilogy" comes from the parallel between the first two films, particularly in their endings which are countered by L'Eclisse. The first two end at dawn with a potential renewal of a relationship which had been partly destroyed.) It has appeared on Sight & Sound's list of the critics' top ten greatest films ever made three times in a row: It was voted second in 1962, fifth in 1972 and seventh in 1982. In 2010, it was ranked number 40 on Empire magazine's "The 100 Best Films of World Cinema". The film would go on to influence several arthouse directors, including Apichatpong Weerasethakul, Jia Zhangke, and Hirokazu Kore-eda.

== Plot ==
Three wealthy Italians—Anna, her boyfriend Sandro, and her friend Claudia—plan a Mediterranean yacht trip to celebrate Sandro's return from a long business trip. Before leaving, Anna visits her father, who senses that her relationship with Sandro is not going well. When Anna meets Sandro in Rome, the reunion is distant and awkward. Even so, the two eventually have sex in his house while Claudia waits.

Sandro drives the two women to the coast, where they join the other members of their voyage, two affluent couples who also have difficult relationships. The next day, the group reaches the Aeolian Islands, and Anna jumps into the water for a swim. Sandro follows her when she claims to have seen a shark, only to discover later that it was a lie. The group tours a desolate island with steep cliffs. Anna tells Sandro that she is unhappy with his frequent business trips, but he dismisses her concerns and takes a nap on the rocks.

Anna goes missing. Sandro brushes it off as typical behavior, but when she fails to reappear, the group searches the island for her, to no avail. Sandro, Corrado and Claudia stay behind to continue the search, while the others notify the authorities. Claudia suggests to Sandro that his neglect may have played a role in Anna's disappearance, offending Sandro. The police and Anna's father arrive, but they cannot find Anna either.

Claudia and Sandro split up to continue the search. Sandro decides to investigate local smugglers, while Claudia decides to search the remaining islands alone. They agree to meet up later in Palermo, but Sandro startles Claudia by kissing her before leaving. The smugglers have no information about Anna's disappearance.

Sandro and Claudia meet at the train station. Their mutual attraction is evident. To avoid Sandro, Claudia boards a train to Palermo and asks him to stay behind. Sandro considers it, but boards the train anyway. Claudia is annoyed, but Sandro sees no sense in sacrificing their attraction. Claudia is troubled by how easily things can change. Sandro relents and gets off the train at Castroreale.

In Messina, Sandro meets with journalist Zuria, who suggests Anna may have been seen by a chemist in Troina. Sandro heads for Troina, but not before bribing Zuria to print the story in the newspaper. Meanwhile, Claudia arrives at Corrado's villa, where no one takes Anna's disappearance seriously. She reads Zuria's story and travels to Troina, where she runs into Sandro. They agree to continue the search together.

Sandro and Claudia interview the chemist Zuria mentioned, who claims to have sold tranquilizers to Anna. They learn that the woman left for Noto in southern Sicily. Together, they drive south. They stop at a deserted village and have sex on a hill overlooking the town. In Noto, they search for Anna at the Trinacria Hotel, but find nothing. Sandro suggests that they marry. Their increasing ennui is briefly interrupted when they ring bells at a local church, but the moment passes. While passing the time, Sandro casually ruins a local artist's drawing; the artist thinks he did it intentionally.

Claudia remains conflicted between her feelings for Sandro and her loyalty to Anna. Even so, when Sandro hesitates to tell her he loves her, Claudia is disappointed. Eventually, the two tell each other they are in love. At the Chiesa del Collegio, Sandro reveals his disappointment with his career and formally proposes to Claudia, but she declines. The next morning, Sandro and Claudia both seem to be passionately in love, but Claudia resists his advances and suggests they leave.

In Taormina, Sandro and Claudia stay at the San Domenico Palace Hotel while Sandro's boss and his wife prepare for a party. Claudia decides to skip it, while Sandro checks out the women and recognizes Gloria Perkins, a beautiful 19-year-old "writer" and aspiring actress who is actually a high-end prostitute. Later, Claudia searches for Sandro. She visits Sandro's boss' hotel room, but Sandro is not there. She confides in the boss' wife that she is scared that Anna has reappeared and retaken Sandro. She questions why she would feel relieved for her friend to be dead.

Claudia eventually finds Sandro in a compromising position with Gloria. Heartbroken, Claudia runs off, and Sandro follows her to the hotel terrace, which has a view of a bombed-out church. Both of them are crying. Claudia considers whether to extend a comforting hand to Sandro. After some thought, she places her hand on Sandro's head and strokes it as they gaze at Mount Etna in the distance.

== Cast ==
- Gabriele Ferzetti as Sandro
- Monica Vitti as Claudia
- Lea Massari as Anna
- Dominique Blanchar as Giulia
- Renzo Ricci as Anna's father
- James Addams as Corrado
- Dorothy de Poliolo as Gloria Perkins
- Lelio Luttazzi as Raimondo
- Giovanni Petrucci as Prince Goffredo
- Esmeralda Ruspoli as Patrizia
- Renato Pinciroli as Zuria, the journalist
- Angela Tomasi di Lampedusa as the princess
- Jack O'Connell as old man on the island (uncredited)
- Prof. Cucco as Ettore (uncredited)

== Production ==
=== Shooting ===
Shooting began in August 1959 and lasted until 15 January 1960. Antonioni began filming the island sequence with the scenes immediately after Anna disappears. The majority of shooting on the island was filmed on the island Lisca Bianca (white fish bone) with a cast and crew of 50 people. Other locations for the island sequence included Panarea (which was the production's headquarters), Mondello and Palermo. Filming the island sequence was intended to take three weeks, but ended up lasting for four months. Difficulties included the islands being infested with rats, mosquitoes and reptiles; also, the weather was unexpectedly cold, and the navy ship hired to transport the cast and crew to the island every day never appeared. In order to carry personal items and equipment to the island, the crew had to build small rafts out of empty gas canisters and wooden planks; these were towed by a launching tug every morning.

One week after shooting began, the film's production company went bankrupt, leaving the production in short supplies of food and water. Antonioni still had a large supply of film stock and managed to get the cast and crew to work for free until funding for the film was found. At one point, ships stopped making trips to Lisca Bianca, and the cast and crew were stranded for three days without food or blankets. Eventually, the crew went on strike and Antonioni and his assistant director shot the film themselves. Due to the rough condition of the sea and the difficulty in landing a ship on the rough rocks of Lisca Bianca, the cast and crew were forced to sleep on the island. Antonioni has stated that he "woke up every morning at 3 o'clock in order to be alone and reflect on what I was doing in order to re-load myself against fatigue and a strange form of apathy or absence of will, which often took hold of us all". After several weeks of Antonioni and the crew working without a budget, the production company Cino del Duca agreed to finance the film and sent money to him.

Whilst shooting on the 40-foot yacht for scenes early in the film, the cast and crew totaled 23 people. Antonioni had wanted to shoot the film chronologically, but the yacht was not available until November. Owing to the cold weather, actress Lea Massari developed a cardiac condition after spending several days swimming in the Mediterranean Sea during filming, and spent several days in a coma after being rushed to Rome for medical treatment.

After completing the island sequence, filming continued throughout Sicily and Italy. The sequence on the train from Castroreale to Cefalù took two days to shoot instead of the intended three hours. The scene in Messina where Sandro encounters Gloria Perkins took two days to shoot; Antonioni initially wanted 400 extras for it. Only 100 turned up, so crew members recruited passers-by on the street to appear in the scene. The sequence where Sandro and Claudia visit a deserted town was shot in Santa Panagia, near Catania in Sicily; buildings there were commissioned by Benito Mussolini, and were examples of fascist architecture of the Mezzogiorno. The scene where Sandro and Claudia first have sex took 10 days to shoot, owing to the crew having to wait for a train to pass by every morning.

=== Filming locations ===
L'Avventura was filmed on location in Rome, the Aeolian Islands, and Sicily.

- Rome
  - Pons Fabricius (outside Sandro's house)
  - St. Peter's Basilica (opening scene from Anna's father's villa)
  - Tiber Island (where Sandro's house is located)
  - Tiber River (near Sandro's house)
- Sicily
  - Metropolitan City of Messina
    - Aeolian Islands
      - Basiluzzo (where Anna jumps from the yacht)
      - Lipari
      - Lisca Bianca (the island from which Anna disappears)
      - Panarea
    - Castroreale (where Sandro alights from the train)
    - Messina (where Sandro meets Zuria and encounters the "writer" Gloria Perkins)
    - Milazzo
      - Capo di Milazzo
    - Taormina
      - Church of San Domenico
      - Piazza San Domenico 5
      - San Domenico Palace Hotel (the terrace in the final scene)
  - Metropolitan City of Palermo
    - Bagheria
      - Corso Umberto
      - Piazza Garibaldi
      - Villa Palagonia (the Customs House in Milazzo)
    - Altavilla Milicia (the platform after Sandro leaves the train)
    - Palermo
      - Mondello
      - Palermo Town Hall
      - Villa Niscemi (Villa Montaldo where Giulia is seduced by the Princess' grandson)
  - Province of Catania
    - Mount Etna
    - Plain of Catania (where Sandro questions the pharmacist)
  - Province of Syracuse
    - Noto
      - Chiesa del Collegio (where Claudia rings the church bells)
      - Church of San Francesca
      - Museo Civico, Santissimo Salvatore (which is closed to Sandro)
      - Noto Cathedral
      - Piazza Immacolata
      - Piazza Municipo (where Sandro "accidentally" spills the ink)
    - Santa Panagia (where Sandro and Claudia have sex on a hill while a train goes by)
    - Syracuse

=== Music ===
The film's musical score was composed by Giovanni Fusco, who had scored all of Antonioni's films up to that time. Antonioni usually only used diegetic music in his films and this was one of the latter times that he (briefly) included a musical score for scenes other than during the credits. For L'Avventura, Antonioni asked Fusco to compose "jazz as though it had been written in the Hellenic era".

=== Production notes ===
- Antonioni wrote that the film was "expressed through images in which I hope to show not the birth of an erroneous sentiment, but rather the way in which we go astray in our sentiments. Because as I have said, our moral values are old. Our myths and conventions are old. And everyone knows that they are indeed old and outmoded. Yet we respect them".
- Metro-Goldwyn-Mayer, American International Pictures, Paramount Pictures and Warner Bros. refused the US distribution rights, so Antonioni sold the project to Columbia Pictures.

== Themes ==
Much has been made of Anna's unsolved disappearance, which Roger Ebert has described as being linked to the film's mostly wealthy, bored, and spoiled characters, none of whom have fulfilling relationships. They are all, according to Ebert, "on the brink of disappearance".

According to Alain Robbe-Grillet, many shots in the "continental" part of the film are taken from the point of view of an unseen character, as if Anna was following Sandro and Claudia to see what they would do. When asked, Antonioni told Robbe-Grillet that the "missing" scene (showing Anna's body recovered from the sea) was scripted and actually filmed but did not make it into the final cut, apparently for timing reasons.

== Release ==
=== Box office ===
L'Avventura grossed 340 million lire in Italy during its initial release in Italy.

=== Critical response ===
Despite the film's eventual lionization by film scholars, the film received a harsh reception at its opening in May at the 1960 Cannes Film Festival. It is one of the festival's more notorious reactions. According to Vitti, the screening of Cannes was a real-life drama. From the opening titles, despite the film's serious tone, laughs erupted in a dark theater packed with critics and photographers. Laughs continued through the runtime, joined by boos. Gene Youngblood said that audience members usually booed during long sequences where nothing happened to further the film's plot, but has asserted that "quite a lot is happening in these scenes". Antonioni and Vitti, who claimed she was sobbing, fled the theater.

The next day, however, the filmmakers were sent a list of signatures from established filmmakers and writers who declared that L'Avventura was the best film screened at Cannes. After a second screening, the film went on to win the Jury Prize at the same festival, and went on to international box office success and what has been described as "hysteria". Youngblood described the trilogy of which L'Avventura is the first component as a "unified statement about the malady of the emotional life in contemporary times".

Bosley Crowther of The New York Times called the film a "weird adventure" and praised its cinematography and performances. Andrew Sarris of The Village Voice called it the movie-going phenomenon of 1961, and praised Antonioni's depiction of characters that cannot communicate with each other. Stanley Kauffmann of The New Republic wrote that "Antonioni is trying to exploit the unique powers of the film as distinct from the theater. ... He attempts to get from film the same utility of the medium itself as a novelist whose point is not story but mood and character and for whom the texture of the prose works as much as what he says in the prose".

On the review aggregator website Rotten Tomatoes, 94% of 52 critics' reviews are positive, with an average rating of 9/10. The website's consensus reads: "L'Avventura marks a bewitchingly ambiguous milestone in Antonioni's career -- and European cinema in general."

Martin Scorsese included it on a list of "39 Essential Foreign Films for a Young Filmmaker".

Alexander Walker judged it the best film ever made.

=== Accolades ===
Award	Year	Category	Recipient(s)	Result
British Film Institute Awards	1960	Sutherland Trophy	Michelangelo Antonioni	Won
Cannes Film Festival	1960	Jury Prize	Michelangelo Antonioni	Won
Cannes Film Festival	1960	Palme d'Or	Michelangelo Antonioni	Nominated
BAFTA Award	1961	Best Film	Michelangelo Antonioni	Nominated
BAFTA Award	1961	Best Foreign Actress	Monica Vitti	Nominated
Globo d'oro	1961	Best Breakthrough Actress	Monica Vitti	Won
Nastro d'Argento	1961	Best Director	Michelangelo Antonioni	Nominated
Nastro d'Argento	1961	Best Original Story	Michelangelo Antonioni	Nominated
Nastro d'Argento	1961	Best Actress	Monica Vitti	Nominated
Nastro d'Argento	1961	Best Supporting Actress	Lea Massari	Nominated
Nastro d'Argento	1961	Best Score	Giovanni Fusco	Won
Nastro d'Argento	1961	Best Cinematography, Black-and-White	Aldo Scavarda	Nominated

=== Home media ===
A digitally restored version of the film (optimal image quality: RSDL dual-layer edition) was released on DVD by The Criterion Collection (under license of Columbia TriStar) in June 2001. The release includes audio commentary by film historian Gene Youngblood, an English subtitle translation, a 58-minute documentary by Gianfranco Mingozzi titled Antonioni: Documents and Testimonials (1966), and writings by Antonioni read by Jack Nicholson with Nicholson's personal recollections of the director.

== Legacy ==
L'Avventura influenced the visual language of cinema, changing how subsequent films looked, and has been named by some critics as one of the best ever made. However, it has been criticized by others for its seemingly uneventful plot and slow pacing, along with the existentialist themes. Youngblood wrote that "very few films in the history of cinema have broken the standard rules of cinematic grammar so elegantly, so subtly, as this film". Jonathan Rosenbaum has called it a masterpiece. Roger Ebert wrote that he came to like the film later in life when he began to admire the "clarity and passion Antonioni brought to the film's silent cry of despair". Geoff Andrew of Time Out London criticized the film, writing that "if it once seemed the ultimate in arty, intellectually chic movie-making, the film now looks all too studied and remote a portrait of emotional sterility". Michael Phillips of the Chicago Tribune defended the film against Andrew's criticism, writing that "it's easy to bash Antonioni as passe. It's harder, I think, to explain the cinematic power of the way his camera watches, and waits, while the people on screen stave off a dreadful loneliness".

It has appeared on Sight & Sound's list of the critics' top 10 greatest films ever made three times in a row: it was voted second in 1962, fifth in 1972 and seventh in 1982. In 2012, it ranked number 21 (with 43 votes) in the critics' poll and number 30 (14 votes) in the directors' poll. In 2010, it was ranked number 40 on Empire magazine's "The 100 Best Films of World Cinema". The film was included on BBC Culture's 2018 list of The 100 greatest foreign language films ranked by 209 film critics from 43 countries around the world.

== See also ==
- Michelangelo Antonioni filmography
