= 41st David di Donatello =

1996 Italian film awards

- Date: 8 June 1996
- Site: Teatro Eliseo, Rome
- Hosted by: Amanda Sandrelli; Massimiliano Pani

Highlights
- Best Picture: August Vacation
- Most awards: The Star Maker, Celluloide (4)
- Most nominations: The Star Maker (11)

Television coverage
- Network: TELE+1

The 41st David di Donatello ceremony, presented by the Accademia del Cinema Italiano, was held on 8 June 1996.

== Winners and nominees ==
Best Film: August Vacation, directed by Paolo Virzì; Celluloide, directed by Carlo Lizzani; Stealing Beauty, directed by Bernardo Bertolucci; The Star Maker, directed by Giuseppe Tornatore	Best Producer: Pietro Innocenzi, Roberto Di Girolamo – Palermo – Milan One Way; Angelo Barbagallo, Nanni Moretti – The Second Time; Amedeo Pagani – Ulysses' Gaze
Best Director: Giuseppe Tornatore - The Star Maker; Bernardo Bertolucci – Stealing Beauty; Carlo Lizzani – Celluloide; Paolo Virzì – August Vacation	Best New Director: Stefano Incerti – The Meter Reader; Mimmo Calopresti – The Second Time; Leonardo Pieraccioni – The Graduates
Best Actor: Giancarlo Giannini – Celluloide; Sergio Castellitto – The Star Maker; Ennio Fantastichini – August Vacation; Giancarlo Giannini – Palermo – Milan One Way	Best Actress: Valeria Bruni Tedeschi – The Second Time; Virna Lisi – Follow Your Heart; Laura Morante – August Vacation; Lina Sastri – Celluloide
Best Supporting Actor: Leopoldo Trieste – The Star Maker; Raoul Bova – Palermo – Milan One Way; Alessandro Haber – The Graduates	Best Supporting Actress: Marina Confalone – The Second Time; Stefania Sandrelli – The Nymph; Lina Sastri – Strangled Lives
David di Donatello for Best Screenplay: Furio Scarpelli, Ugo Pirro, Carlo Lizzani – Celluloide; Francesco Bruni, Paolo Virzì – August Vacation; Fabio Rinaudo, Giuseppe Tornatore – The Star Maker	Best Cinematography: Alfio Contini – Beyond the Clouds; Darius Khondji – Stealing Beauty; Dante Spinotti – The Star Maker
Best Production Design: Francesco Bronzi – The Star Maker; Enrico Job – The Nymph; Gianni Silvestri – Stealing Beauty	Best Score: Manuel De Sica – Celluloide; Ennio Morricone – The Star Maker; Armando Trovaioli – The Story of a Poor Young Man
Best Editing: Cecilia Zanuso – Who Killed Pasolini?; Ugo De Rossi – Palermo – Milan One Way; Massimo Quaglia – The Star Maker; Pietro Scalia – Stealing Beauty; Carla Simoncelli – Strangled Lives	Best Sound: Giancarlo Laurenzi – Palermo – Milan One Way; Massimo Loffredi – The Star Maker; Alessandro Zanon – The Second Time
Best Costumes: Jenny Beavan – Jane Eyre; Beatrice Bordone – The Star Maker; Luciano Sagoni – Celluloide	Best Foreign Film: Nelly and Mr. Arnaud, directed by Claude Sautet; Mighty Aphrodite, directed by Woody Allen; Smoke, directed by Wayne Wang
Best Foreign Actor: Harvey Keitel – Smoke; Michel Serrault – Nelly and Mr. Arnaud; Woody Allen – Mighty Aphrodite	Best Foreign Actress: Susan Sarandon – Dead Man Walking; Emmanuelle Béart – Nelly and Mr. Arnaud; Emma Thompson – Sense and Sensibility
Special David: Virna Lisi; Rita Cecchi Gori; Aurelio De Laurentiis; Giovanni Di Clemente	Lifetime Achievement David (for the 40th anniversary): Vittorio Gassman; Gina Lollobrigida
