= Violent Summer =

1959 Italian film

Estate violenta
- Theatrical release poster
- Directed by: Valerio Zurlini
- Written by: Valerio Zurlini; Suso Cecchi d'Amico; Giorgio Prosperi
- Produced by: Silvio Clementelli
- Starring: Eleonora Rossi Drago; Jean-Louis Trintignant; Enrico Maria Salerno; Jacqueline Sassard; Lilla Brignone; Raf Mattioli
- Cinematography: Tino Santoni
- Edited by: Mario Serandrei
- Music by: Mario Nascimbene
- Production company: Titanus
- Distributed by: Titanus
- Release date: November 1959 (Italy)
- Running time: 103 minutes
- Countries: Italy; France
- Language: Italian

Violent Summer (Italian: Estate violenta, French: Été violent) is a 1959 Italian–French drama film directed by Valerio Zurlini, his second feature film. Set in the Italian seaside resort of Riccione in July 1943, it depicts a love affair between a prominent Fascist's young draft-dodging son, portrayed by Jean-Louis Trintignant, and a naval officer's widow, older than he, portrayed by Eleonora Rossi Drago.

== Plot ==
Carlo, 21 years old and exempted from military service, is spending the summer in his father's empty villa and relaxing with friends in Riccione, a seaside town untouched by the war. When a German aircraft flies low over the beach, people panic and Carlo comforts a frightened little girl. She is reclaimed by her mother Roberta, a 30 year old widow of a heroic naval officer. Carlo and Roberta are attracted to each other and he asks her out, taking her for a trip to the neutral state of San Marino, although he has a girlfriend, Rossana. Roberta's mother warns her to avoid him because his father is a vicious Fascist party boss and his mother was a promiscuous film actress.

Roberta's younger sister-in-law Maddalena arrives as a refugee from the fighting in the south, and Roberta asks Carlo's friends to let her join them. They all go to a circus, which is interrupted by an air raid, so Carlo asks everybody back to his father's villa. In the blackout, couples dance to the music of Temptation. Hesitant at first, Roberta eventually ends up in the garden in the arms of Carlo, and they kiss, caught by Rossana.

When news comes of the fall of the Fascist regime, jubilant citizens sack the party headquarters, toppling the bust of Mussolini. Carlo's father flees and the villa is requisitioned to house refugees. Carlo and Roberta spend the night making love on the deserted beach. When she returns home, both Maddalena and her mother express their disapproval of the affair, to which she replies, that nobody had cared when she was married to an older man, and that for the first time in her life she is happy. Maddalena refuses to stay in Roberta's and her mother's villa any longer and leaves town.

Meeting again on the beach after curfew, Carlo and Roberta are arrested by an army patrol, who discover that Carlo's exemption has expired. They release him on the promise that he will report for service at Bologna next day. Roberta, afraid to lose Carlo, persuades him to come with her to her empty villa in Rovigo and hide from the draft. The reluctant Carlo explains that his place had always been with the crowd, but eventually gives in. Their journey is interrupted by an air raid, and due to the damage, all trains are cancelled except those heading back south. Roberta enters the train back to Riccione, where she left her daughter. Carlo stays behind, trying to make her understand why he must stay. He expresses his hope that they will meet again, but Roberta replies that she is convinced that their parting is final.

== Cast ==
- Eleonora Rossi Drago as Roberta
- Jean-Louis Trintignant as Carlo
- Enrico Maria Salerno as Carlo's father
- Jacqueline Sassard as Rossana
- Lilla Brignone as Roberta's mother
- Federica Ranchi as Maddalena
- Raf Mattioli as Giorgio

== Production ==
Regarding the origins of the subject of his film, director Valerio Zurlini wrote:

"I chose the theme of the 1940s because it was the theme of my youth. The film, however, is not autobiographical at all. Every now and then I'm accused of writing autobiography, but I believe—as Thomas Mann said—that autobiography is a writer's childhood disorder, and so I try desperately to avoid it. (...) This doesn't mean that autobiography, once thrown out the door, doesn't come back in through the window, because it re-enters the atmosphere, the time being described, the air, so many things. I had always remembered that last, incredible, dramatic, and strange vacation that was the summer of '43, after which, for me, for two years, there were no more vacations or summers because I went to war.

== Release ==
Violent Summer was released in Italian cinemas in November 1959. A DVD containing both Zurlini's Violent Summer and Girl with a Suitcase was released by the label NoShame in 2006.

== Awards ==
- Nastro d'Argento: Best Actress (Eleonora Rossi Drago), Best Score (Mario Nascimbene)
- Mar del Plata Film Festival: Best Actress (Eleonora Rossi Drago)
