= The Inquiry (1986 film) =

- Directed by: Damiano Damiani
- Screenplay by: Vittorio Bonicelli; Damiano Damiani
- Story by: Suso Cecchi d'Amico; Ennio Flaiano
- Produced by: Fulvio Lucisano; Silvio Clementelli
- Starring: Keith Carradine; Harvey Keitel
- Cinematography: Franco Di Giacomo
- Music by: Riz Ortolani
- Release date: 1986
- Running time: 107 minutes
- Country: Italy
- Languages: Italian; English

The Inquiry (Italian: L'inchiesta) is a 1986 Italian historical drama film co-written and directed by Damiano Damiani. It stars Keith Carradine and Harvey Keitel. For this film Lina Sastri was awarded with a David di Donatello for Best Supporting Actress. The film had a remake with the same title in 2006.

== Plot ==
Tiberius sends Titus Valerius Taurus to Judea to investigate Jesus, whose followers say he has risen. However, he is stopped by Pontius Pilate, who has sentenced Jesus to death. Claudia Procula, Pilate's wife, helps Taurus because she liked Jesus's teachings. She shows Taurus where Jesus's body was buried. A few more questions are asked, and Pilate makes up a story about finding the body to end the investigation. Taurus knows it is not Jesus's body. After many ups and downs, he meets Mary of Magdala, who cares for lepers outside Jerusalem. He goes to her community to keep a promise and learns about Jesus' disciples serving the suffering. Valerio Tauro is killed in the desert by Pilate's vengeance.

== Cast ==
- Keith Carradine as Titus Valerius Taurus
- Harvey Keitel as Pontius Pilate
- Lina Sastri as Mary Magdalene
- Phyllis Logan as Claudia Procula
- Angelo Infanti as Trifone
- Luciano Bartoli as Criside
- John Forgeham as Marco
- Erik Schumann as Flavio
- Georgia Slowe as Sara
- Salvatore Borghese

== Awards ==
- 1987 David di Donatello Awards
  - David di Donatello for Best Supporting Actress to Lina Sastri
  - Alitalia Awards to Silvio Clementelli, Anna Maria Clementelli, Damiano Damiani and Fulvio Lucisano
  - Nomination David di Donatello for Best Cinematography to Franco Di Giacomo
- 1987 Silver Ribbon
  - Silver Ribbon for Best Subject to Suso Cecchi D'Amico and Ennio Flaiano
  - Silver Ribbon for Best Score to Riz Ortolani
  - Nomination Silver Ribbon for Best Screenplay to Vittorio Bonicelli and Damiano Damiani
  - Nomination Silver Ribbon for Best Supporting Actress to Lina Sastri
  - Nomination Silver Ribbon for Best Costumes to Giulia Mafai
- 1987 Golden Ciak
  - Nomination Golden Ciak for Best Supporting Actress to Lina Sastri
  - Nomination Golden Ciak for Best Costumes to Giulia Mafai

== See also ==
- List of Italian films of 1986
