= Jacqueline Sassard =

French actress (1940–2021)

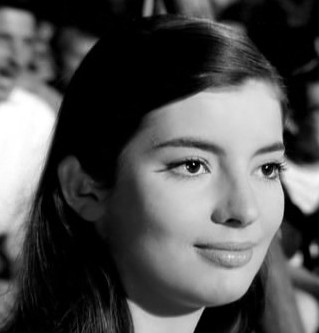
- Sassard in Violent Summer (1959)
- Born: 13 March 1940; Nice, France
- Died: 17 July 2021 (aged 81); Lugano, Switzerland
- Occupation: Actress
- Years active: 1956–1969
- Spouse: Gianni Lancia

Jacqueline Maryvonne Sassard (13 March 1940 – 17 July 2021) was a French actress.

== Life and career ==
Born and raised in Nice, Sassard made her film debut at the age of 16, in Je plaide non coupable (1956). The following year, she played the title role in the Italian comedy Guendalina. The year after, she starred in Antonio Pietrangeli's March's Child, which earned her the Best Actress Award at the 1958 San Sebastián International Film Festival.

The success of those role saw her play a string of starring roles in Italian films, most notably Valerio Zurlini's Violent Summer (1959). That year, she also played the role of an English journalist on a business trip to the Kingdom of Naples in the comedy film Ferdinando I °, Re di Napoli, and co-starred opposite Alain Delon in the French comedy Women Are Weak.

During the 1960s, Sassard appeared in variety of mostly-Italian productions. She played love interests in two peplum films, My Son, the Hero (1962) with Giuliano Gemma, and Pirates of Malaysia (1964) with Steve Reeves. She co-starred in the romantic drama Seasons of Our Love (1966) with Gian Maria Volonté and Anouk Aimée.

Her best remembered role was in Joseph Losey's Accident, with a script by Harold Pinter, as an Austrian university student caught in a love triangle with two of her professors (played by Dirk Bogarde and Stanley Baker). The film won the Grand Prix Spécial du Jury at the 1967 Cannes Film Festival, and was nominated for four BAFTA Awards, including Best British Film.

The year after, she starred opposite Jean-Louis Trintignant in Claude Chabrol's Les Biches (1968). Her final screen appearance was in Le voleur de crimes, also starring Jean-Louis and directed by his wife Nadine in 1969.

== Personal life ==
In a 2012 interview, Jean-Louis Trintignant claimed Sassard was in a relationship with Valerio Zurlini during the 1960s.

Sassard left the film industry on her marriage to Lancia CEO Gianni Lancia. They lived for a number of years in Brazil before returning to live in Alpes-Maritimes in the south of France. They had a son, Lorenzo.

=== Death ===
Sassard died on 17 July 2021 in Lugano, Switzerland, at the age of 81.

== Selected filmography ==
- Je plaide non coupable (1956)
- Guendalina (1957)
- March's Child (1958)
- Three Murderesses (1958)
- Everyone's in Love (1959)
- The Magistrate (1959)
- Violent Summer (1959)
- Ferdinando I, re di Napoli (1959)
- My Son, the Hero (1962)
- Freddy and the Song of the South Pacific (1962)
- Seasons of Our Love (1966)
- Accident (1967)
- Les Biches (1968)
- Le Voleur de crimes (1969)
