= Vittoria Belvedere =

Italian actress (born 1972)

- Born: 17 January 1972 (age 54); Vibo Valentia, Calabria, Italy
- Occupation: Actress
- Years active: 1992–present

Vittoria Belvedere (born 17 January 1972) is an Italian actress. She has appeared in several films but most of her work is television based.

== Career ==
In 1992, she made her debut in the film In camera mia, directed by Luciano Martino. In 1993, she appeared in the mini-series Delitti privati, directed by Sergio Martino.

She played Julia the Elder in the Anglo-Italian mini series Imperium: Augustus.

She hosted the 2003 edition of Sanremo Festival with Pippo Baudo and Manuela Arcuri.

In 2006, she starred in 10 episodes of the Italian romantic drama series Nati ieri.

== Personal life ==
She is married to Vasco Valerio, an executive TV producer and has three children.

== Filmography ==
=== Cinema ===
- 1992 - In camera mia, directed by Luciano Martino
- 1992 - Zoloto, directed by Fabio Bonzi
- 1993 - Graffiante desiderio, directed by Sergio Martino
- 1994 - Ritorno a Parigi, directed by Maurizio Rasio
- 1998 - Passaggio per il paradiso, directed by Antonio Baiocco
- 1999 - La spiaggia, directed by Mauro Cappelloni
- 2000 - Si fa presto a dire amore, directed by Enrico Brignano
- 2004 - La lettera, directed by Luciano Cannito
- 2008 - ((Cascia)) Saint Rita
- 2012 - The Immature: The Trip, directed by Paolo Genovese

=== Television ===
- 1993 - Piazza di Spagna, directed by Florestano Vancini
- 1993 - Delitti privati, directed by Sergio Martino
- 1993 - La famiglia Ricordi, directed by Mauro Bolognini
- 1995 - Arsène Lupin, directed by Vittorio De Sisti
- 1996 - Commandant Nerval, directed by Henri Helman e Arnaud Sélignac
- 1996 - Il ritorno di Sandokan, directed by Enzo G. Castellari
- 1998 - Provincia segreta, directed by Francesco Massaro
- 1998 - Trenta righe per un delitto, directed by Lodovico Gasparini
- 1998 - Lui e lei, directed by Luciano Manuzzi
- 1998 - Le ragazze di Piazza di Spagna, directed by José María Sánchez
- 1999 - Le ragazze di Piazza di Spagna 2, directed by Gianfranco Lazotti
- 1999 - Lui e lei 2, directed by Elisabetta Lodoli e Luciano Manuzzi
- 1999 - Riding the storm, directed by Bernd Böhlich
- 2000 - Senso di colpa, directed by Massimo Spano
- 2000 - Le ragazze di Piazza di Spagna 3, directed by Riccardo Donna
- 2001 - Un coeur oublié, directed by Philippe Monnier, with Michel Serrault
- 2001 - L'uomo che piaceva alle donne - Bel Ami, directed by Massimo Spano
- 2002 - San Giovanni - L'Apocalisse, directed by Raffaele Mertes
- 2003 - ICS - L'amore ti dà un nome, directed by Alberto Negrin
- 2003 - Imperium: Augustus, directed by Roger Young
- 2003 - Nessuno al posto suo, directed by Gianfranco Albano
- 2004 - Part Time, directed by Angelo Longoni
- 2004 - Saint Rita, directed by Giorgio Capitani
- 2005 - Padri e figli, directed by Gianfranco Albano e Gianni Zanasi
- 2005 - Il bambino sull'acqua, directed by Paolo Bianchini
- 2005 - Il mio amico Babbo Natale, directed by Franco Amurri
- 2005 - Giovanni Paolo II, directed by John Kent Harrison
- 2006 - Nati ieri, directed by Carmine Elia, Paolo Genovese and Luca Miniero
- 2007 - Viaggio in Italia - Una favola vera, directed by Paolo Genovese and Luca Miniero
- 2010 - Crimini, directed by Claudio Bonivento
- 2013 - Un caso di coscienza, directed by Luigi Perelli

== Gallery ==
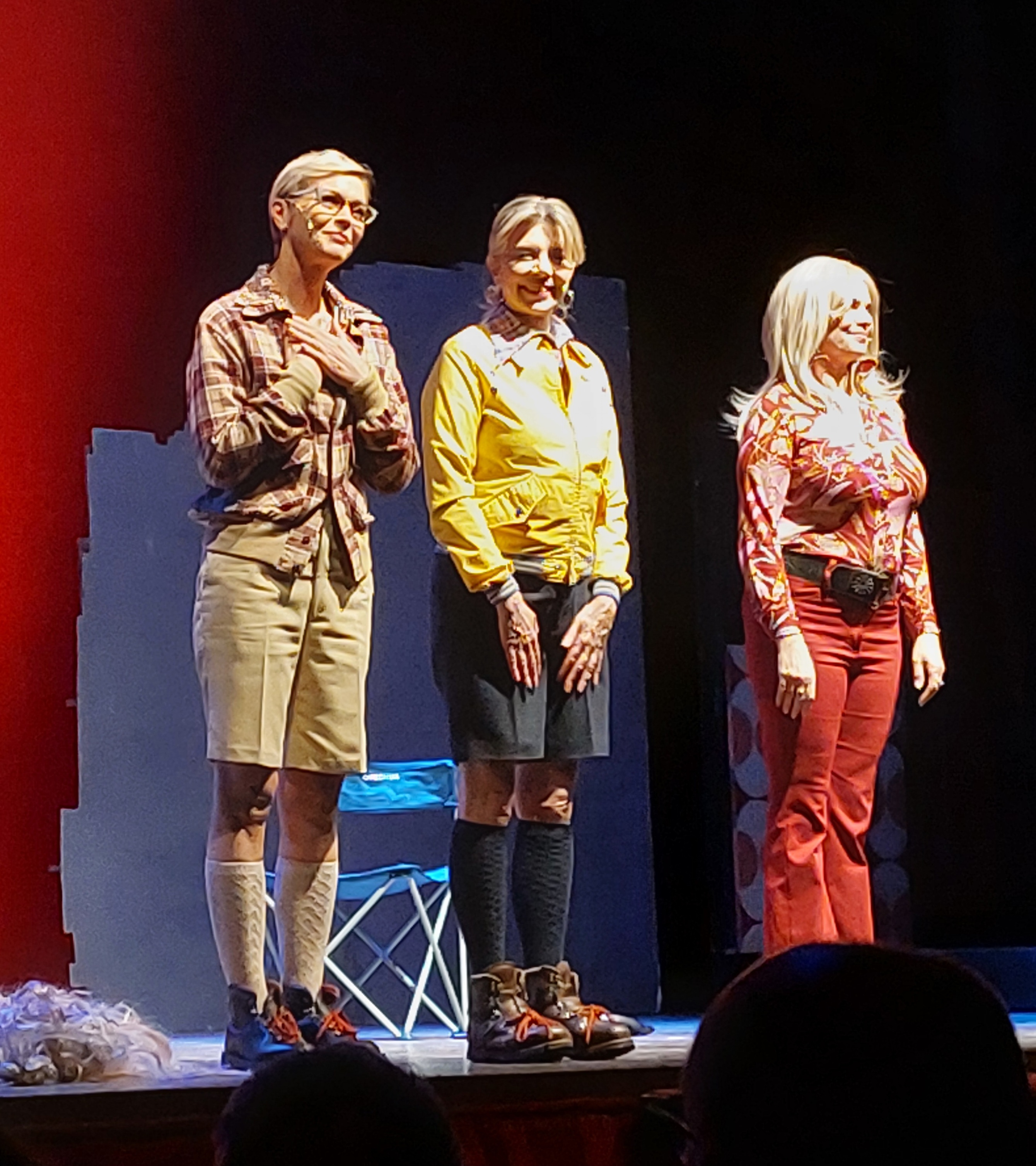
Vittoria Belvedere, Benedicta Boccoli and Debora Caprioglio
Donne in pericolo, Teatro San Domenico, Crema, 1 December 2024.
