= Vasco Pratolini =

Italian writer (1913–1991)

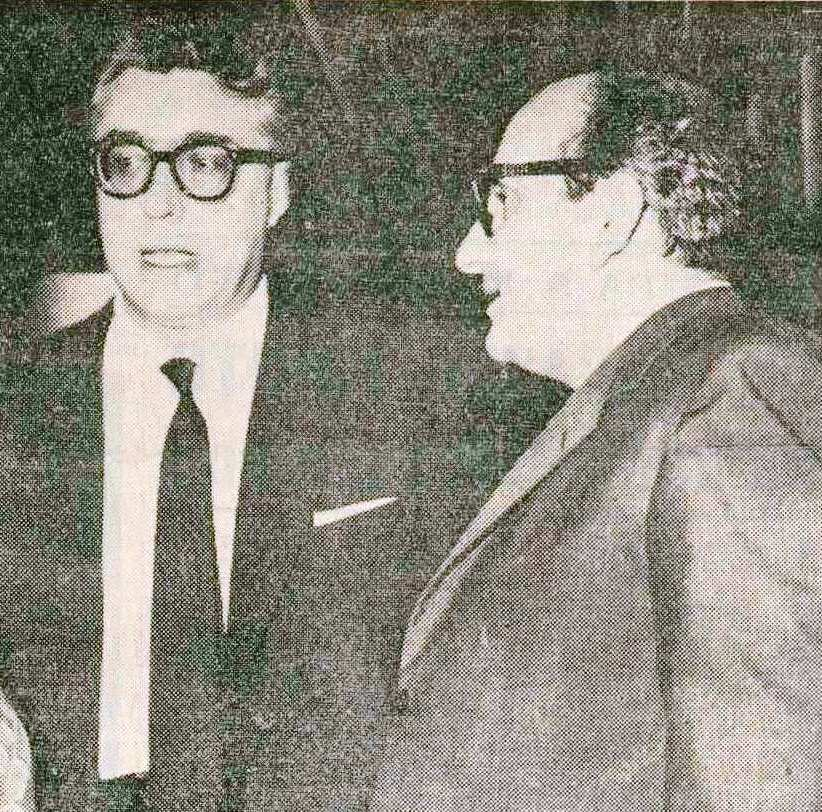
- Vasco Pratolini (right) with the Italian writer Luigi Silori, 1959
- Born: 19 October 1913; Florence, Italy
- Died: 12 January 1991 (aged 77)
- Writing career
- Genres: novels screenwriting
- Notable works: Cronaca familiare (1947); Cronache di poveri amanti (1947); Metello (1955)

Signature
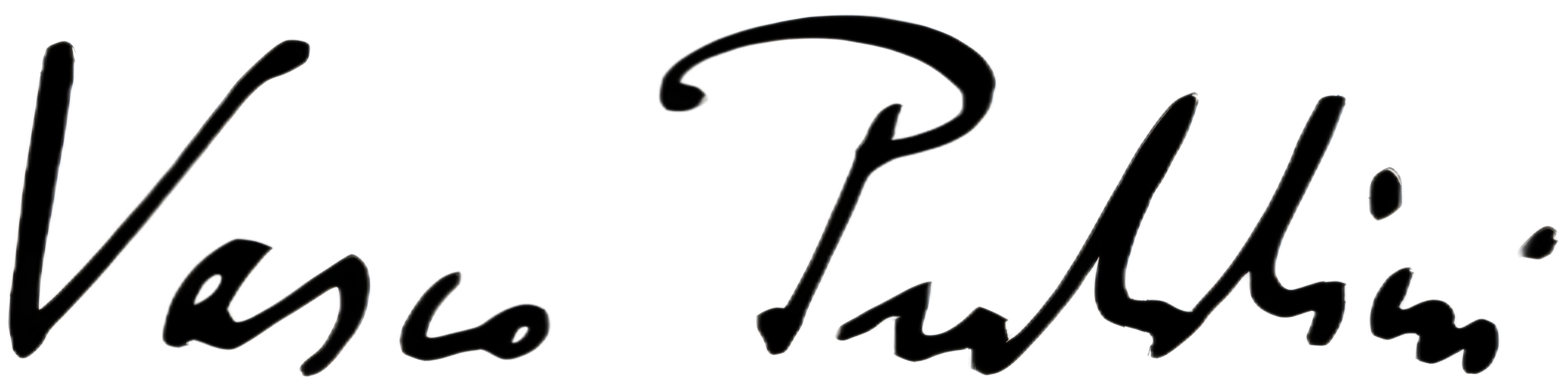

Vasco Pratolini (19 October 1913 – 12 January 1991) was an Italian writer of the 20th century. He was nominated for the Nobel Prize in Literature three times.

== Biography ==
Born in Florence, Pratolini worked at various jobs before entering the literary world thanks to his acquaintance with Elio Vittorini. In 1938 he founded, together with Alfonso Gatto, the magazine Campo di Marte. His work is based on firm political principles and much of it is rooted in the ordinary life and sentiments of ordinary, modest working-class people in Florence.

During World War II, he fought with the Italian partisans against the German occupation. After the war he also worked in the cinema, collaborating as screenwriter to films such as Luchino Visconti's Rocco and His Brothers , Roberto Rossellini's Paisan and Nanni Loy's [The Four Days of Naples. In 1954 and 1961 Valerio Zurlini turned two of his novels, Le ragazze di San Frediano and Cronaca familiare, into films.

The Soviet composer Kirill Molchanov produced the Russian-language opera Via del Corno (Улица дель Корно) based on an anti-fascist story by Pratolini, to his own Russian libretto in Moscow, 1960.

His most important literary works are the novels Cronaca familiare (1947), Cronache di poveri amanti (1947) and Metello (1955).

He died in Rome in 1991.

== Works ==
- Il tappeto verde (1941)
- Via de' magazzini (1941)
- Le amiche (1943)
- Il quartiere (1943), translated as The Naked Streets (USA) or A Tale of Santa Croce (UK)
- Cronaca familiare (1947), translated as "Family Chronicle" or Two Brothers
- Cronache di poveri amanti (1947), translated as A Tale of Two Poor Lovers
- Diario sentimentale (1947)
- Mestiere da vagabondo, 1947 (collection of stories)
- Un eroe del nostro tempo (1947), translated in 1951 by Eric Mosbacher as "A Hero of Our Time"
- Le ragazze di San Frediano (1949), translated as The Girls of Sanfrediano
- La domenica della povera gente (1952)
- Lungo viaggio di Natale (1954)
- Metello (1955), translated by Raymond Rosenthal (Little, Brown, 1968)
- Lo scialo (1960)
- La costanza della ragione (1963), translated as Bruno Santini. A Novel by Raymond Rosenthal (Little, Brown, 1964)
- Allegoria e derisione (1966)
- La mia città ha trent'anni (1967)
- Il mannello di Natascia (1985)
