= March's Child =

- Directed by: Antonio Pietrangeli
- Cinematography: Carlo Carlini
- Edited by: Eraldo Da Roma
- Music by: Piero Piccioni
- Release date: 1958
- Country: Italy
- Language: Italian

March's Child (Italian: Nata di marzo) is a 1958 Italian comedy film. It stars actor Gabriele Ferzetti.

== Cast ==
- Gabriele Ferzetti as Sandro
- Jacqueline Sassard as Francesca
- Mario Valdemarin as Carlo
- Tina De Mola as Nella
- Ester Carloni as Grandmom
- Franca Mazzoni as Francesca's mother
- Franco Rossellini as Rolando
- Lina Furia as Carmela
- Gina Rovere as Prostitute
- Elvira Tonelli as Armida
- Eraldo Da Roma as Tito
- Edda Ferronao as Venetian maid
- Dario Fo (cameo)
