= The Camp Followers =

Le soldatesse
- Directed by: Valerio Zurlini
- Written by: Leonardo Benvenuti, Piero De Bernardi
- Starring: Anna Karina
- Music by: Mario Nascimbene
- Release date: 4 November 1965
- Running time: 120 minutes
- Country: Italy
- Language: Italian

The Camp Followers (Italian: Le soldatesse) is a 1965 Italian World War II film directed by Valerio Zurlini and starring Anna Karina. Based on a 1956 novel by Ugo Pirro, it tells the story of a young lieutenant in the Italian Army who in 1942 is ordered to take a lorryload of Greek prostitutes from starving Athens under Axis occupation to entertain the Italian troops fighting Partisans in Albania. The film was entered into the 4th Moscow International Film Festival where it won the Special Silver Prize.

== Plot ==
In 1942, disheartened at the starvation and disease in Athens, Lieutenant Martino of the Italian Army requests a posting elsewhere. He finds himself, with a Sergeant Castagnoli, in charge of a lorry containing twelve prostitutes who he has to deliver up country to various military establishments. This is not what he joined the army for, nor does he see how it will contribute to victory. On the way, they are obliged to accept a Major Alessi as a passenger. An unpleasant character, he outranks Martino and can enforce his will on the two soldiers and on the women.

One night, the party are able to sleep in comfort in some abandoned railway carriages, and the men pair off with some of their charges. The pragmatic Castagnoli links up with the older and more realistic Ebe. Martino fancies the forthright Eftichia, who has strong views on life, but in the event is approached by the gentle Elenitza who seeks no trouble. Next morning a lorry full of Blackshirts passes and their leader, a hero of the war in Spain, asks for one of the girls. On the road again, after a few kilometers Martino's party comes across the remains of the Blackshirts, their lorry and their prostitute, all killed by Partisans. Alessi goes wild at the scene of slaughter and hysterically vows revenge.

Shortly after, their own lorry is ambushed and goes off the road in flames. The survivors carry the wounded to an abandoned cottage, where the still hysterical Alessi says he will go and get help. Realising he wants to escape, the wounded Castagnoli stops him at gunpoint. Meanwhile, Elenitza is succumbing to her wounds and in front of everybody Alessi shoots her dead. After dark, carrying Castagnoli, what is left of the group staggers over the mountains and arrives at a village which is being emptied and burned by Blackshirts, who Alessi joins up with. They have captured some alleged partisans, who they shoot.

In the end, Martino is able to get Castagnoli into a military hospital, where Ebe makes sure he is comfortable, and to deliver the few prostitutes he has left. After what she has seen, Eftichia can no longer bear the thought of sleeping with Italians but makes one last exception in the case of Martino. After a night together, she walks off into the mountains to join the partisans. Martino is on his own again, without purpose and even more disillusioned.

== Cast ==
- Anna Karina ... Elenitza
- Lea Massari ... Toula
- Marie Laforêt ... Eftichia
- Tomas Milian ... Ten.Gaetano Martino
- Mario Adorf ... Castagnoli
- Valeria Moriconi ... Ebe
- Aleksandar Gavric ... Alessi (as Aca Gavric)
- Rossana Di Rocco ... Panaiota, Toula's sister
- Milena Dravic ... Aspasia
- Guido Alberti ... Gambardelli
- Mila Stanic
