= Saint Rita (film) =

- Written by: Maura Nuccetelli; Elisabetta Lodoli
- Directed by: Giorgio Capitani
- Starring: Vittoria Belvedere
- Composer: Marco Frisina
- Original language: Italian

Production
- Cinematography: Fabrizio Lucci
- Editor: Antonio Siciliano
- Running time: 200 min.

Original release
- Network: Canale 5
- Release: 2004

Saint Rita (Italian: Rita da Cascia) is a 2004 Italian television movie directed by Giorgio Capitani. The film is based on real life events of Augustinian nun and Saint Rita of Cascia.

== Cast ==
- Vittoria Belvedere as Rita Lotti
- Martin Crewes as Paolo Mancini
- Simone Ascani as Tommaso
- Lina Sastri as Abbess
- Adriano Pappalardo as Guido Cicchi
- Dietrich Hollinderbäumer as Ferdinando Mancini
- Michaela Rosen as Teresa Mancini
- Sandro Giordano as Bernardo Mancini
- Manolo Capissi as Giangiacomo Mancini
- Stanislao Capissi as Pietro Maria Mancini
- Sydne Rome as Amata Lotti
- Giorgia Bongianni as Caterina Mancini
- Mirco Petrini as Francesco Mancini
- Sebastiano Colla as Ludovico Cicchi
- Belinda Sinclair as Sister Matilde
- Giacomo Piperno as Antonio Lotti
