= Private Crimes =

- Delitti privati
- Genre: Mystery
- Developed by: Franco Marotta (writer); Laura Toscano (writer)
- Directed by: Sergio Martino
- Composer: Natale Massara
- Country of origin: Italy
- Original language: Italian

Production
- Executive producer: Pietro Innocenzi
- Producer: Edwige Fenech
- Cinematography: Giancarlo Ferrando
- Editor: Eugenio Alabiso

Original release
- Release: 1993

Private Crimes (Delitti privati) is a 1993 Italian mystery mini television series directed by Sergio Martino.

== Plot ==
The story, set in Lucca, sees the death of a businessman, Marco Pierboni, killed in the garden of his villa outside the city, even if the body is found near the factory who ran while a young girl studying in a conservatory, Sandra Durani, disappears and is later found dead near the bank of the river Serchio as a witness of the murder. At the same time begin to circulate in the city a series of anonymous letters, creating a climate of suspicion in the investigation that involves some people who direct and those who only marginally so far were above all suspicion, and even a third is killed person, Paolo Roversi, a friend of Sandra who was looking for items to be acquitted of double murder.

In response to these crimes Nicole Venturi, a French journalist and mother of Sandra, follow closely with colleague Andrea Baresi the survey coordinated by the Police Commissioner Stefano Avanzo and begins to be idea about the identity of the murderer until you get to see a sad truth to kill the daughter and the contractor was severe Scali, villa Pierboni's governess and best friend of Nicole, to avenge the death of daughter Nina, who committed suicide because it ignores Marco Pierboni with whom she had an affair, while the third murder committed by the housekeeper, too, was due to the fact that Paolo Roversi had suspected something about the theft of paintings took place in the villa outside the city.

Immediately after the confession of severity, Nicole will also discover the author of anonymous letters, ten in all, except the last, written by Dr. Guido Braschi in a desperate attempt to save another pain to Matilde Pierboni the other nine letters were indeed written by Filippo Pierboni, the son of the entrepreneur, who tries to commit suicide out of despair, without success. In the final scene, Nicole's friend greets commissioner before leaving Lucca and boards the train while the two promise each other that sooner or later they would meet again.

== Cast ==
- Edwige Fenech as Nicole Venturi
- Ray Lovelock as Inspector Stefano Avanza
- Manuel Bandera as Andrea Baresi
- Victoria Vera as Anna Selpi
- Gudrun Landgrebe as Daniela Pierboni
- Maja Maranow as Milena Bolzoni
- Lorenzo Flaherty as Paolo Roversi
- Joe Kloenne as Marco Pierboni
- Annie Girardot as Ada Roversi
- Paolo Malco as Massimo Pierboni
- Cinzia De Ponti as Magistrate Castelli
- Carlo Cartier as Franco Martelli
- Stefano Nosei
- Davide Bechini as Filippo Pierboni
- Silvia Mocci as Chiara Malvini
- Néstor Garay as lawyer Portili
- Carlo Monni as Paolo's father
- Giovanni Visentin
- Vittoria Belvedere as Sandra Durani
- Laurent Terzieff as Carlo Mauri
- Jacques Perrin as Roberto Durani
- Gabriele Ferzetti as Dr. Guido Braschi
- Alida Valli as Matilde Pierboni
