= Rina Giachetti =

Italian singer

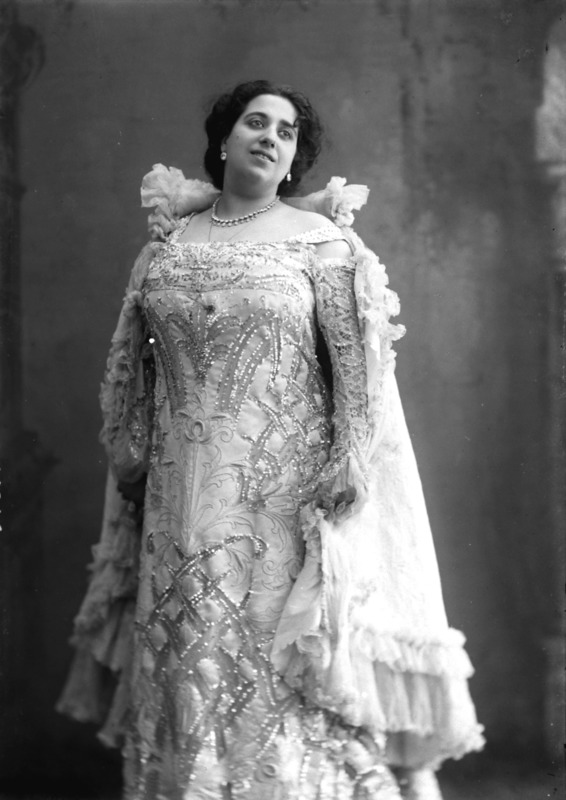
- Born: 25 August 1880; Florence
- Died: 1 June 1959 (aged 78); Cerreto Guidi
- Other names: Rina Giacchetti, Rina Pierallini
- Occupation: Opera singer

Rina Emilia Lucia Giachetti (25 August 1880 – 1 June 1959) was an Italian operatic lyric soprano.

== Early life ==
Rina Emilia Lucia Giachetti was born in Florence in 1880, the daughter of Guido Giachetti and Giuseppina Guidalotti Giachetti. She studied voice with Carlo Carignani in Milan.

== Career ==
Giachetti had her opera debut in 1899 in Bizet's Carmen, at the Verdi Theatre in Zadar. She sang in most of the popular operas of her time in Europe, and was a favorite of Puccini's. Her starring roles in Cendrillon (1902), Aida (1903), Tosca (1903), Les Huguenots (1904), Un ballo in maschera (1905), Madama Butterfly (1905), and Fedora (1906). She played Musetta in the first Neapolitan production of Leoncavallo's La bohème in 1902. She shared star billing with Enrico Caruso in Manon in 1902, and toured in South America with Caruso in 1905. She sang at London's Covent Garden often from 1904 to 1908. Her audiences included King Edward VII and Queen Alexandra in Great Britain, Wilhelm II of Germany, and the King and Queen of Portugal.

== Personal life and legacy ==
Rina Giachetti had both intimate and professional associations with Enrico Caruso. Her older sister Ada Botti Giachetti, also an opera singer, was the mother of two sons with Caruso. Giachetti married a doctor, Galileo Pierallini. She died in Cerreto Guidi, near Florence, in 1959, aged 78 years.

Giachetti recurs as a figure in popular culture primarily because of her association with Caruso. She was one of the narrating characters in Mary di Michele's novel Tenor of Love (2007). She was played by Martina Stella in a biographical drama for Italian television, Caruso, la voce dell'amore (2012). Some of her correspondence with Caruso was part of an archive auctioned by Christie's in 2014.
