= Imperium: Augustus =

2003 television miniseries

- British DVD cover
- Written by: Eric Lerner
- Directed by: Roger Young
- Starring: Peter O'Toole; Vittoria Belvedere; Charlotte Rampling; Juan Diego Botto; Ken Duken; Anna Valle
- Music by: Pino Donaggio
- Countries of origin: United Kingdom; Italy; France
- Original language: English

Production
- Producer: Luca Bernabei; Ferdinand Dohna; Salvatore Morello
- Cinematography: Giovanni Galasso
- Editor: Alessandro Lucidi
- Running time: 200 minutes

Original release
- Release: 2003

Imperium: Augustus is a 2003 joint British-Italian production, and part of the Imperium series. It tells of the life story of Octavian and how he became Augustus. Half the film takes place in the past (as Augustus explains to his daughter Julia how he became who he is) and the other half takes place in the later life of Augustus.

The drama starred Peter O'Toole as Augustus, Charlotte Rampling as Livia, Vittoria Belvedere as Julia, Ken Duken as Marcus Agrippa, Benjamin Sadler as Octavian (young Augustus) and Juan Diego Botto as Iullus Antonius. It was filmed in Tunisia. The film was produced by EOS Entertainment and Lux Vide for RAI, Telecinco and ZDF.

== Plot ==
As Augustus lies on his death bed, he recalls the events that led to the exile of his daughter, Julia.

Following an assassination attempt on his life, Marcus Agrippa, Augustus's oldest friend as well as Julia's husband and father to her children, is called back to Rome for his protection. However, he dies of a fever on his way back to Rome. Upon hearing the news Augustus consoles Julia by recalling his rise to power along with Agrippa.

Following their success serving Julius Caesar, Octavius's great-uncle, during the final battle of Caesar's Civil War, they are sent to Macedonia together along with Maecenas to continue their education as soldiers and diplomats. However, shortly after, they hear news of the Caesar's assassination and that Octavius has been named his heir, forcing them to return to Rome.

In the ensuing power struggle that follows Caesar's death, Octavius is forced to ally himself with Mark Antony, Caesar's right-hand man. In their pursuit of Marcus Junius Brutus, Gaius Cassius Longinus and their co-conspirators, a wave of executions spread across Rome, practically eliminates the old Roman ruling class, including Cicero and Livia's father. After the Battle of Phillipi, Octavius and Mark Antony divide government of the Empire between the two of them, with Antony taking Egypt and Octavius taking Rome. Octavius marries Scribona, while Antony marries Octavius's elder sister, Octavia. However, following Julia's birth, Octavius leaves her to marry Livia, which to present day Julia resents.

Governing Rome with Maecenas and Agrippa, they work to improve Rome's infrastructure by implementing Agrippa's skills as an architect and Maecenas's knowledge of law and politics. However, Antony becomes the lover of the Egyptian queen, Cleopatra, and being taken in by the Egyptian culture of divinity, he abandons Octavia and declares war on Rome. Eventually, Egypt is conquered by Octavius, Agrippa, and Maecenas following the Battle of Actium. However, while Agrippa wishes to reinstate the Republic, Maecenas wishes for Octavius to become the emperor of Rome. Octavius is given the title Augustus and is acknowledged as the sole-ruler of the Empire but refuses the title of king.

In the present day, several months after Agrippa's death, Augustus and Livia force Julia to marry Livia's son, Tiberius. Neither are happy with the arrangement as Tiberius is happily married and Julia is in love with Iullus, Mark Antony's son whom Augustus spared following the conquest of Rome and was raised by Octavia. In order to spare Julia's feelings, Augustus sends Tiberius to Gaul while telling Julia that she can continue her relationship with Iullus provided they are discreet. Unbeknownst to either of them, Iullus is conspiring to assassinate Augustus along with Julia's half-brother, Scipio, as revenge for Augustus's crimes against their parents.

Upon learning of Julia's relationship with Iullus, Tiberius returns to Rome in a rage to confront her for dishonoring him. When she refuses to submit to him, he attacks and rapes her. Julia suffers a mental breakdown afterward, confiding in Iullus that she wishes her father would die so her suffering would end. Iullus and Scipio conspire to kill Augustus for Julia's sake as well as their own. Tiberius, who is planning to kill Iullus for infidelity with his wife, overhears the plot and informs his mother. Livia decides that they will catch Iullus in the act and in doing so would rid themselves of Julia, focusing Augustus to accept Tiberius as his successor.

The assassination plan is foiled when the noise alerts Livia, Julia and Tiberius to the scene. Tiberius fatally wounds Iullus and saves Augustus just as Julia enters. Before he dies, Iullus tells Julia, "I did it for you."

Although Julia was unaware of the plot, Augustus demands the Senate exile her for adultery. Informing her of his decision to banish her, he insists on keeping her children. Before she leaves Julia tells Augustus it would have been kinder to kill her at birth rather and that she, at least, loves her children enough not to use them as he has with her. Shortly after Julia is exiled, both her sons die of fever.

Back on his deathbed, Augustus calls out for Julia. She reveals that she has returned to Rome in disguise and goes to his bedside though she refuses to take his hand. However, when he asks her "Did I play my part well in the comedy of life?" she takes the death mask from Livia, kisses his forehead and places it herself over Augustus's smiling dead face.

== Cast ==
- Peter O'Toole as Augustus
- Benjamin Sadler as Octavian/Young Augustus
- Vittoria Belvedere as Julia
- Charlotte Rampling as Livia
- Juan Diego Botto as Iullus Antonius
- Ken Duken as Marcus Agrippa
- Gerard Klein as Julius Caesar
- Gottfried John as Cicero
- Russell Barr as Maecenas
- Alexander Strobele as Lucius Tutilius
- Anna Valle as Cleopatra
- Massimo Ghini as Mark Antony
- Michael Reale as Lepidus
- Martina Stella as Young Livia
- Elena Ballesteros as Octavia
- Valeria D'Obici as Atia
- Michele Bevilacqua as Tiberius
- Achille Brugnini as Cassius
- Giampiero Judica as Scipio
- Vanni Materassi as Musa
- Antonio Petrocelli as Brutus
- Riccardo De Torrebruna as Decimus

== Historical accuracy ==
Imperium: Augustus has received criticism for its historical accuracy on the characters and the events that happened, but has been made popular due to the exciting soap opera feeling the drama has. Among its many criticisms is the way Augustus' daughter, Julia, was portrayed. While the character herself is similar in terms of personality, her behaviour with other men is not drawn entirely as history recalls her. Modern historians however have come to see Julia as a much more tragic character than history tells her as, and therefore a number of the changes made to her character is justified. Near the end the Julia scandal breaks and Iullus tries to assassinate Augustus. In reality he never came close and was the only of Julia's lovers that did not get exiled: his fate was far worse, being tried for treason and sentenced to death. He committed suicide before they could execute him. Iullus was also not in Egypt to be spared as the film portrayed.

Octavian has Caesar's son with Cleopatra and only one of Antony's children executed. Although it accurately shows Octavian sparing the children and sending them to live with his sister, Iullus was one of Antony's children who stayed in Athens with Octavia when Antony ran back to Cleopatra and divorced Octavia. Another change made for drama was when Julia came to see her father from exile while he was on his bed. In reality she died the same year as Augustus but never returned to Rome.

== Critical reception ==
"Imperium: Augustus is equal parts history lesson and soap opera. Peter O'Toole plays Octavius/Augustus, heir to his doomed uncle Julius Caesar's command of the far-flung Roman empire. Surviving an assassination attempt and struck by news of the death of his old friend and ally, Agrippa (Ken Duken), in the same day, Octavius waxes nostalgic about his youthful exploits in Caesar's army (Benjamin Sadler plays the young Augustus in flashbacks) and his unprepared immersion in the deadly politics of the Mark Antony (Massimo Ghini) era. More immediate are Octavius' problems trying to stave off conspiracies by his wife Livia (Charlotte Rampling) to set up the emperor's stepson, Tiberius (Michele Bevilacqua), as heir, and talk his dutiful daughter Julia (Vittoria Belvedere) into a marriage she does not want. Roger Young directs this highly watchable costume drama, and O'Toole's golden presence makes the ancient intrigues tragically human." --Tom Keogh

== See also ==
- List of historical drama films
- List of films set in ancient Rome
- Augustus
- Julio-Claudian dynasty
- Second Triumvirate
