= Le ragazze di San Frediano =

Novel by Italian author Vasco Pratolini

Le ragazze di San Frediano (English: The Girls of San Frediano) is a 1949 novel by Italian author Vasco Pratolini.

== Plot ==
The novel is set in Florence at the end of the Second World War. The story follows the escapades of a Florentine mechanic, a local "Don Giovanni," who romances several women simultaneously and secretly. His multiple relationships come to the women's attention, and they conceive a plot to punish the mechanic for his behavior.

== Film adaptations ==
The novel has been adapted to film twice:

- In 1954, a cinematic adaptation directed by Valerio Zurlini was released. The film represented Zurlini's directorial debut, and was one of the first movies to be filmed in Florence. The 1954 film starred:
  - Antonio Cifariello as Bob;
  - Rossana Podestà as Tosca;
  - Corinne Calvet as Bice;
  - Giovanna Ralli as Mafalda;
  - Marcella Mariani as Gina; and
  - Giulia Rubini as Silvana.
- In 2007, a television miniseries adaptation aired on Italian television channel Rai Uno. This adaptation was directed by Vittorio Sindoni and starred:
  - Giampaolo Morelli as Bob;
  - Camilla Filippi as Tosca;
  - Donatella Salvatico as Bice;
  - Vittoria Puccini as Mafalda;
  - Chiara Conti as Gina; and
  - Martina Stella as Silvana.
