= Donne assassine =

- Genre: Anthology; Docu-drama; Mystery; Thriller
- Created by: Wilder
- Country of origin: Italy
- No. of seasons: 1
- No. of episodes: 8

Original release
- Network: Fox Crime (Italy)
- Release: October 16 – December 4, 2008

Donne assassine is an Italian thriller anthology television series.

== Cast ==
- Ana Caterina Morariu: Lisa
- Claudia Pandolfi: Manuela
- Sandra Ceccarelli: Chiara
- Marina Suma: Laura
- Martina Stella: Patrizia
- Caterina Murino: Anna Maria
- Valentina Cervi: Margherita
- Violante Placido: Marta
- Sabrina Impacciatore: Veronica
- Donatella Finocchiaro: Marta
- Giorgio Colangeli: Padre Ignazio
- Giuseppe Battiston

== See also ==
- List of Italian television series
