= Martina Stella =

Italian actress and screenwriter (born 1984)

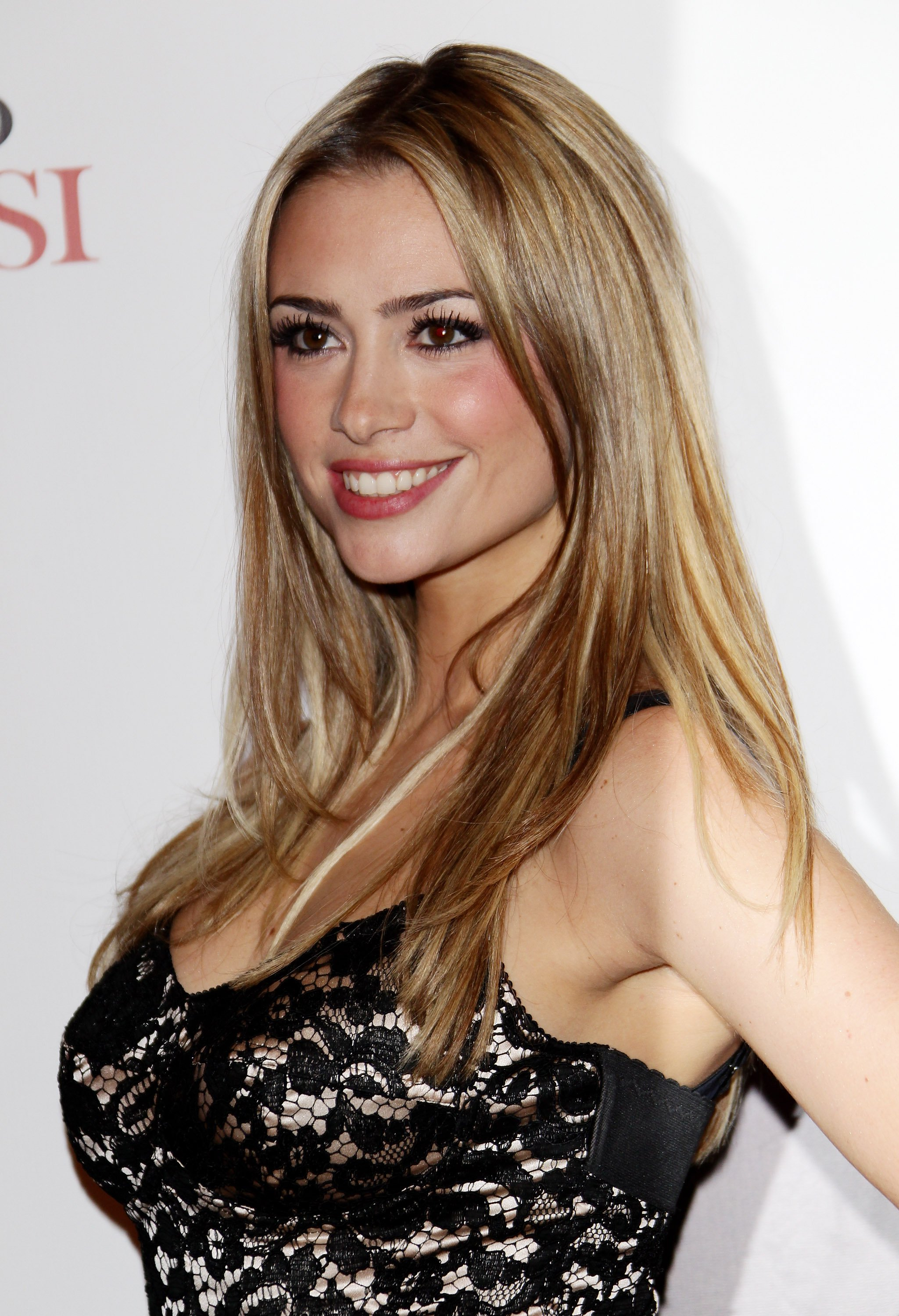
- Stella in 2017
- Born: 28 November 1984 (age 41); Florence, Tuscany, Italy
- Occupations: Actress; screenwriter
- Spouse: Andrea Manfredonia (m. 2016)
- Children: 2

Martina Stella (born 28 November 1984) is an Italian actress and screenwriter.

== Acting career ==
Stella made her cinematic debut at the age of 16 in 2001 in L'ultimo bacio. The film was a success in Italy, and was nominated for multiple David di Donatello awards, including Best Film.

L'ultimo bacio was released internationally, with the title The Last Kiss for English-speaking audiences. Reviews of Stella's performance as Francesca, a beautiful teenager who seduces Carlo (Stefano Accorsi), a man in a committed relationship, were generally positive. One American reviewer compared her to "a young Reese Witherspoon", while another described her portrayal in greater depth:

In an American movie, Francesca would be presented as a virgin with a Britney Spears-like come-on or trivialized as a mindless bimbo. In "The Last Kiss," she's presented without judgment as a normal, sexually active girl with a lot to learn about men. It's a balanced and sympathetic portrait.

Stella proceeded to build a career as an actress in Italian films, including 2002's Amnèsia, which was directed by past Academy Award-winner Gabriele Salvatores. Her film career has also included a small role in the 2004 Hollywood movie Ocean's Twelve. She studied English for her role in the 2009 Rob Marshall film Nine.

Stella made her theatrical debut in 2002 in Aggiungi un posto a tavola, and briefly returned to the stage in 2006 in Romeo e Giulietta. Stella has also played lead roles in various Italian television projects, including the miniseries Le ragazze di San Frediano and Piper.

== Other media ==
In July 2014, AMBI Group announced it had optioned the rights to Stella's screenplay O.O.B.I., which in June 2014 won the award for Best Screenplay at the third edition of the Italian Contemporary Film Festival in Toronto.

Stella has been a spokesperson for various commercial products (primarily clothing and cosmetics) and for several charitable causes.

Stella often visits Italian television talk shows to promote her acting projects and interests. She has also been a prank victim on Italian television's Scherzi a Parte, and she acted in the music video for the song "Eternal woman" by the Belgian band dEUS.

== Personal life ==
Stella began dating hair stylist Gabriele Gregorini in 2011. In May 2012, Stella announced she had become pregnant with Gregorini's child, and on 30 October 2012 their daughter Ginevra was born. In 2014, Stella and Gregorini split. She married Andrea Manfredonia in 2016, and the couple's son Leonardo was born in November 2021. They divorced in 2024.

== Filmography ==
=== Cinema ===
Year	Film	Role	Other notes
2001	L'ultimo bacio	Francesca	Directed by Gabriele Muccino
2002	Amnèsia	Luce	Directed by Gabriele Salvatores
2002	Nemmeno in un sogno	Vale	
2002	Un amore perfetto	Laura	
2004	Ocean's Twelve	Nagel's assistant	Directed by Steven Soderbergh
2008	K. Il bandito	Clara	
2008	Il mattino ha l'oro in bocca	Cristina	
2008	Il seme della discordia	Nike	
2009	Nine	Donatella	Directed by Rob Marshall
2009	Un'estate ai Caraibi	Laura	Directed by Carlo Vanzina
2010	Ti presento un amico	Gabriella	Directed by Carlo Vanzina
2014	Sapore di te	Anna	Directed by Carlo Vanzina
2015	Rosso Mille Miglia	Maria Esse	Directed by Claudio Uberti
2018	Natale a cinque stelle	Giulia Rossi	Directed by Marco Risi
2020	Lockdown all'italiana	Tamara	Directed by Enrico Vanzina

=== Television ===
Year	Film	Role	Other notes
2003	Imperium: Augustus	Young Livia	
2004	Le stagioni del cuore	Emma Valenti	
2006	La freccia nera	Giovanna Bentivoglio di Fanes	Television miniseries
2007	Le ragazze di San Frediano	Silvana	Television miniseries
2007	Piper	Milena	
2009	Donne assassine	Patrizia	
2011	Tiberio Mitri: il campione e la miss	Fulvia Franco	
2011	Angeli e diamanti	Giorgia	
2011	Tutti pazzi per amore 3	Elisa Trombetti	
2012	Caruso, la voce dell'amore	Rina Giachetti	
2016	Matrimoni e altre follie	Monica	
