= Guendalina (film) =

1957 film

- Film poster
- Directed by: Alberto Lattuada
- Written by: Valerio Zurlini; Leonardo Benvenuti; Piero De Bernardi; Jean Blondel; Alberto Lattuada
- Produced by: Dino De Laurentiis; Carlo Ponti
- Starring: Jacqueline Sassard
- Cinematography: Otello Martelli
- Edited by: Leo Catozzo; Eraldo Da Roma
- Music by: Piero Piccioni
- Release date: 20 February 1957
- Running time: 103 minutes
- Country: Italy
- Language: Italian

Guendalina is a 1957 Italian comedy film directed by Alberto Lattuada. It was entered into the 1957 Cannes Film Festival.

== Cast ==
- Jacqueline Sassard as Guendalina
- Raf Mattioli as Oberdan
- Sylva Koscina as Francesca, Guendalina's mother
- Raf Vallone as Guido, Guendalina's father
- Leda Gloria as Oberdan's mother
- Lili Cerasoli as Bianchina
- Fanny Landini
- Loretta Capitoli
- Leonardo Botta
- Antonio Mambretti as Businessman
- Flavia Solivani
- Tonino Cianci
- Enzo Cerusico as Postman
- Giancarlo Cobelli as Barber
- Decimo Cristiani
- Carla Gravina
- Stelio Candelli
- Geronimo Meynier
