= Ferdinando I, re di Napoli =

1959 film

- Film poster
- Directed by: Gianni Franciolini
- Written by: Pasquale Festa Campanile; Massimo Franciosa
- Produced by: Silvio Clementelli
- Starring: Peppino De Filippo; Eduardo De Filippo; Nino Taranto; Titina De Filippo
- Cinematography: Mario Montuori
- Edited by: Mario Serandrei
- Music by: Angelo Francesco Lavagnino
- Distributed by: Titanus
- Release date: 22 December 1959
- Running time: 105 minutes
- Country: Italy
- Language: Italian

Ferdinando I, re di Napoli is a 1959 Italian comedy film directed by Gianni Franciolini.

== Plot ==
King Ferdinand I of the Two Sicilies is unpopular with the people in early nineteenth-century Naples. Public sentiment is galvanized by Pulcinella and his theater troupe, whose stage performances are critical of the king. Worried about the spread of Republican ideas, the king goes incognito among his subjects to gain first-hand impressions. When he stumbles into Pulcinella's orbit, complications ensue.

== Cast ==
- Peppino De Filippo – Ferdinand I.
- Eduardo De Filippo – Pulcinella
- Titina De Filippo – Titina
- Vittorio De Sica – Seccano
- Aldo Fabrizi – A peasant
- Marcello Mastroianni – Gennarino
- Leslie Phillips – Pat
- Renato Rascel – Mimi
- Jacqueline Sassard – Cordelia
- Rosanna Schiaffino – Nannina
- Nino Taranto – Tarantella
- Memmo Carotenuto
- Pietro De Vico
- Giacomo Furia
- Nino Vingelli
