= Accident (1967 film) =

1967 film by Joseph Losey

- UK film poster
- Directed by: Joseph Losey
- Screenplay by: Harold Pinter
- Based on: Accident (1965 novel) by Nicholas Mosley
- Produced by: Joseph Losey; Norman Priggen
- Starring: Dirk Bogarde; Stanley Baker; Jacqueline Sassard; Michael York; Vivien Merchant; Delphine Seyrig; Alexander Knox
- Cinematography: Gerry Fisher
- Edited by: Reginald Beck
- Music by: John Dankworth
- Production company: Royal Avenue Chelsea Productions
- Distributed by: London Independent Producers
- Release date: 9 February 1967 (London)
- Running time: 105 minutes
- Country: United Kingdom
- Language: English
- Budget: £299,970.00 or £272,811
- Box office: £40,010 (UK gross) £95,153 (world gross)

Accident is a 1967 British drama film directed and produced by Joseph Losey, adapted by Harold Pinter from the 1965 novel by Nicholas Mosley. It stars Dirk Bogarde, Stanley Baker, and Jacqueline Sassard, with supporting roles played by Michael York, Vivien Merchant, Delphine Seyrig, and Alexander Knox. In the film, two middle-aged academics find themselves in love triangle with their own student, who is already engaged.

This film is the second of three Losey–Pinter collaborations; the others are The Servant (1963) and The Go-Between (1971). It was also the last of several collaborations between Losey and Stanley Baker.

Accident was released by London Independent Producers on 9 February 1967, and received generally positive reviews. At the 1967 Cannes Film Festival, it won the Grand Prix Spécial du Jury award. It was nominated for four BAFTA Awards, including Best British Film and Best British Screenplay.

== Plot ==
During the hours of darkness, a car crashes. A man, Stephen, goes to it and finds a young man dead and a shocked but uninjured young woman whom he lifts from the car and takes back to his nearby house. The film then goes into flashback.

Stephen, a married Oxford tutor in his forties, has two students: the rich and likeable William, of whom he is fond, and a beautiful, enigmatic Austrian named Anna, whom he secretly desires. William also fancies Anna and hopes to know her better. While Stephen's wife is away having their third child, he looks up an old flame in London and they have sex. Returning home, he finds that his pushy colleague Charley has been using the house for sex with Anna. She tells Stephen privately that she and William are engaged to be married.

William says that he will go to Stephen's house after a party that night. As he is too drunk to drive, Anna takes the wheel, but she crashes the car outside Stephen's gate. Upon finding the accident and William dead, Stephen pulls the deeply shaken Anna from the wreckage and hides her upstairs while he calls the police. Later, he rapes her while she is still in shock, then takes her back to her room at the university. He comes by in the morning to find a bemused Charley, who cannot prevent Anna from packing to return to Austria.

== Cast ==
- Dirk Bogarde as Stephen
- Stanley Baker as Charley
- Jacqueline Sassard as Anna
- Michael York as William
- Vivien Merchant as Rosalind
- Alexander Knox as the University Provost
- Delphine Seyrig as Francesca
- Ann Firbank as Laura
- Brian Phelan as Police Sergeant
- Terence Rigby as Plainclothes policeman
- Freddie Jones as Man in Bell's office
- Jill Johnson as Secretary
- Jane Hillary as Receptionist
- Maxwell Caulfield (credited as 'Maxwell Findlater') as Ted
- Carole Caplin as Clarissa
- Nicholas Mosley as Hedges
- Steven Easton as Stephen and Rosalind's baby

Losey makes a cameo appearance in the film, and Pinter has a brief speaking role as the television producer, Mr. Bell.

== Reception ==
=== Box office ===
The film performed poorly at the box office. In 1973, Losey said the film was "officially in bankruptcy."

=== Initial critical response ===
In his review upon the film's release, New York Times critic Bosley Crowther called Accident "a sad little story of a wistful don ... neither strong drama nor stinging satire."

Responding to criticism that the film's meaning was difficult to discern, Stanley Baker said: "It's obvious what Accident meant ... It meant what was shown on the screen." Of Joseph Losey's direction, Baker said: "One of Joe's problems is that he tends to wrap things up too much for himself. I think that 75% of the audience didn't realise that Accident was a flashback."

On Rotten Tomatoes, Accident holds a rating of 76% from 29 reviews.

=== Awards and nominations ===
Institution	Year	Category	Nominee	Result	Ref.
Belgian Film Critics Association	1968	Grand Prix	—N/a	Won	
British Academy Film Awards	1968	Best British Film	Joseph Losey	Nominated	
British Academy Film Awards	1968	Best British Screenplay	Harold Pinter	Nominated	
British Academy Film Awards	1968	Best British Actor	Dirk Bogarde	Nominated	
British Academy Film Awards	1968	Best British Art Direction (Colour)	Carmen Dillon	Nominated	
Cannes Film Festival	1967	Palme d'Or	Joseph Losey	Nominated	
Cannes Film Festival	1967	Grand Prix Spécial du Jury (Note: Tied with I Even Met Happy Gypsies (1967).)	Joseph Losey	Won	
Golden Globe Awards	1968	Best English-Language Foreign Film	—N/a	Nominated	
National Board of Review	1967	Top Ten Films	—N/a	Won	
National Society of Film Critics	1968	Best Supporting Actress	Vivien Merchant	Nominated	
Sant Jordi Awards	1968	Best Performance in a Foreign Film	Dirk Bogarde (Note: Shared with The Servant (1963).)	Won	
Writers' Guild of Great Britain	1968	Best British Screenplay	Harold Pinter	Nominated	
Writers' Guild of Great Britain	1968	Merit Scroll	Harold Pinter	Won	

=== Retrospective appraisal ===
Perhaps the most celebrated sequence in the movie, comprising 25 minutes of the 105 minute film, is set at Stephen and Rosalind's home on a Sunday afternoon. Anna and William are the invited guests, but Charley intrudes on the company unexpectedly. A tennis doubles match is arranged—Stephen and Charley vs. William and Anna—in which Losey reveals, cinematically, the undercurrents of sexual tension among the three men. Film critic Robert Maris writes: "As in Pinter's plays, the dialogue is often mundane, but conversations are usually loaded with menacing implications or punctuated by lengthy silences. One scene, involving a doubles tennis match, is so laden with psychological tension and jealousy—with piercing glances across the court or a ball hit at an opponent a little too hard—that it seems less a tennis match than some sort of sexual game."

Film critics James Palmer and Michael Riley cite the dialogue from the "deceptively casual, languid scene on the lawn" which follows the tennis match, serving as "a paradigm of reflexive storytelling."

Charley, Stephen's academic colleague, challenges literature student William to create an omniscient narrative for characters in a novel, based on those attending the gathering:

CHARLEY. - Describe what we're all doing. (WILLIAM looks around the garden.)

WILLIAM. ''Rosalind's lying down. Stephen's weeding the garden. Anna's making a daisy chain.
CHARLEY. Good. But you could go further. Rosalind is pregnant. Stephen's having an affair with a girl at Oxford. He's reached the age where he can't keep his hands off the girls at Oxford.
WILLIAM. What?
CHARLEY. But he feels guilty, of course. So he makes up a story.
WILLIAM. What story?
CHARLEY. This story.
WILLIAM. What are you talking about? (CHARLEY sits up and swats violently at flies.)
CHARLEY. Oh, these flies are terrible.
WILLIAM. What flies? There aren't any flies.
CHARLEY. They're Sicilian horse flies, from Corsica.
(CHARLEY shouts across the lawn.) Have you heard our conversation? (STEPHEN weeding).
STEPHEN. Yes! ROSALIND lying, eyes closed.
ROSALIND.Yes

ANNA carefully places daisy chain around CLARISSA’s neck (Rosalind's daughter).

Film critic Dan Callahan at Senses of Cinema registers this assessment of Losey's second film collaboration with playwright Harold Pinter - Accident, though revered by many critics, is a self-conscious art film with a sexy veneer—it evaporates off the screen. Everything about it is oblique, glancing and empty."

== Sources ==
- Brandum, Dean. 2017. Accident (Joseph Losey, 1967). Senses of Cinema, March 2017 Love Letters: 1967 Issue 82. https://www.sensesofcinema.com/2017/1967/accident-joseph-losey/nt Accessed 10 November, 2024.
- Callahan, Dan. 2003. Losey, Joseph. Senses of Cinema, March 2003. Great Directors Issue 25.https://www.sensesofcinema.com/2003/greatdirectors/losey/#:~:text=The%20dominant%20themes%20of%20Losey's,love%20story%20in%20his%20films. Accessed 12 October, 2024.
- Gardner, Geoff. 2001. Unkind Cuts: Joseph Losey’s Eve. Senses of Cinema, December 2001. Underrated and Overlooked, Issue 18. https://www.sensesofcinema.com/2001/underrated-and-overlooked/losey_eve/ Accessed 12 November, 2024.
- Hirsch, Foster. 1980. Joseph Losey. Twayne Publishers, Boston, Massachusetts. ISBN 0-8057-9257-0
- Maras, Robert. 2012. Dissecting class relations: The film collaborations of Joseph Losey and Harold Pinter. World Socialist Web Site, May 28, 2012. https://www.wsws.org/en/articles/2012/05/lose-m28.html Accessed 12 October, 2024.
- Palmer, James and Riley, Michael. 1993. The Films of Joseph Losey. Cambridge University Press, Cambridge, England. ISBN 0-521-38386-2
- Walsh, David. 2009. Questions and answers on the Hollywood blacklists—Part 2: An interview with film historian Reynold Humphries. World Socialist Web Site, March 12, 2009.https://www.wsws.org/en/articles/2009/03/hum2-m12.html Accessed 10 October, 2024.

Further reading

- Billington, Michael (2007) Harold Pinter. London: Faber and Faber, ISBN 978-0-571-23476-9 (13)
- Billington, Michael (1996) The Life and Work of Harold Pinter. London: Faber and Faber, ISBN 0-571-17103-6 (10)
- Gale, Steven H. (2003) Sharp Cut: Harold Pinter's Screenplays and the Artistic Process, Lexington, Kentucky: The UP of Kentucky, ISBN 0-8131-2244-9 (10) ISBN 978-0-8131-2244-1 (13)
- Gale, Steven H. (2001) The Films of Harold Pinter. Albany: SUNY P ISBN 0-7914-4932-7 ISBN 978-0-7914-4932-5
