= Silvio Clementelli =

Italian film producer (1926–2001)

- Born: 28 October 1926; Monte Porzio Catone, Italy
- Died: 4 December 2001 (aged 75); Rome, Italy
- Occupation: Film producer
- Years active: 1953–1991

Silvio Clementelli (28 October 1926 – 4 December 2001) was an Italian film producer. He produced more than 50 films between 1953 and 1991. He was a member of the jury at the 1989 Cannes Film Festival.

== Selected filmography ==
- Policarpo (1959)
- Violent Summer (1959)
- Ferdinando I, re di Napoli (1959)
- The Passionate Thief (1960)
- Three Nights of Love (1964)
- When Women Had Tails (1970)
- Ninì Tirabusciò: la donna che inventò la mossa (1970)
- Traffic Jam (1979)
