= Valerio Zurlini =

Italian film director (1926–1982)

- Born: 19 March 1926; Bologna, Italy
- Died: 26 October 1982 (aged 56); Verona, Italy
- Occupations: Director, screenwriter
- Years active: 1944–1976

Valerio Zurlini (19 March 1926 – 26 October 1982) was an Italian stage and film director and screenwriter.

== Biography ==
During his law studies in Rome, he started working in the theatre. In 1943, he joined the Italian resistance. He filmed short documentaries in the immediate post-war period before he directed his first feature film in 1954, The Girls of San Frediano. In 1958, Zurlini won the Nastro d'Argento together with Leonardo Benvenuti, Piero De Bernardi and Alberto Lattuada for Best Script for Lattuada's Guendalina. Zurlini made his name as a director with his second feature film, Violent Summer (1959), starring Eleonora Rossi Drago and Jean Louis Trintignant.

In 1961, Zurlini filmed Girl with a Suitcase, starring Claudia Cardinale, who became a film star in Italy, and Jacques Perrin, who would become Zurlini's favorite actor. His 1962 film Family Diary earned Zurlini the Golden Lion at the Venice Film Festival (it tied with Tarkovsky's Ivan's Childhood). Both The Girls of San Frediano and Family Diary were based on Vasco Pratolini's work.

The Camp Followers (1965) was entered into the 4th Moscow International Film Festival, where it won the Special Silver Prize. Zurlini admired the work of Italian novelist Giorgio Bassani and hoped to adapt his novel The Garden of the Finzi-Continis, which was subsequently directed by Vittorio De Sica in 1971 (see The Garden of the Finzi-Continis).

Zurlini's last film, The Desert of the Tartars (1976), produced by Jacques Perrin and featuring an all-star ensemble, was based on Dino Buzzati's novel of the same name. It earned Zurlini both the David di Donatello and the Nastro d'Argento for Best Director. In 1977 he was a member of the jury at the 10th Moscow International Film Festival.

The visual style of Zurlini's adaptations was informed by Giorgio de Chirico, Giorgio Morandi and Ottone Rosai's paintings. During the last years of his life Zurlini taught at the Centro Sperimentale di Cinematografia in Rome. He died in Verona on 26 October 1982.

== Legacy ==
After Zurlini's death, his work fell into relative obscurity, but regained popularity in the 2000s after several of his retrospectives were met with success internationally. In 2006, NoShame Films released The Desert of the Tartars, Violent Summer and Girl With a Suitcase on DVD.

== Filmography (selected) ==
- The Girls of San Frediano (1954)
- Guendalina (1957, screenplay only)
- Violent Summer (1959)
- Girl with a Suitcase (1961)
- Family Diary (1962)
- The Camp Followers (1965)
- Black Jesus (1968)
- Indian Summer (1972)
- The Desert of the Tartars (1976)
