= Lina Sastri =

Italian actress and singer

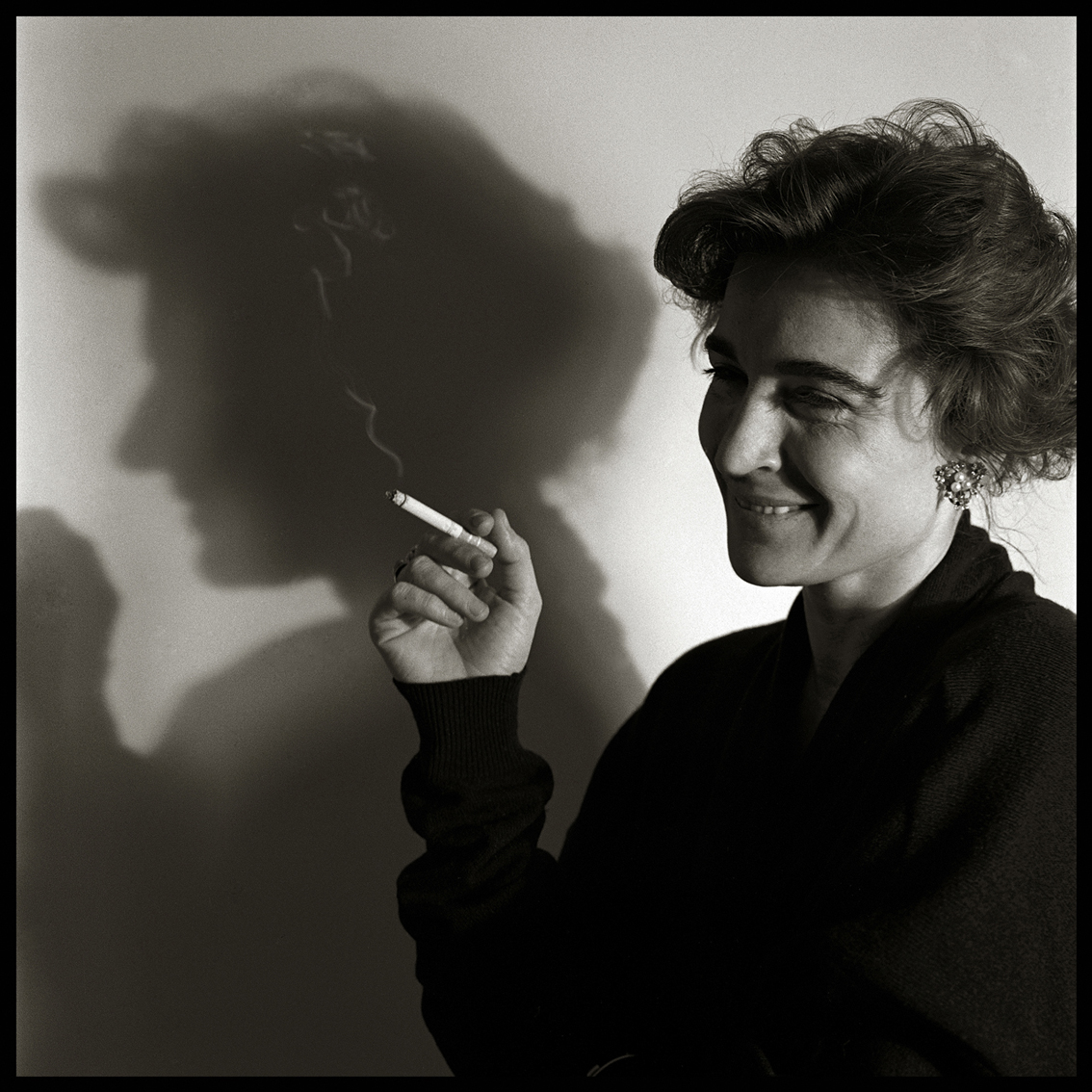
- Lina Sastri in 1987, photographed by Augusto De Luca
- Born: Pasqualina Sastri; Naples, Italy
- Occupations: Actress, singer

Pasqualina "Lina" Sastri is an Italian actress and singer.

== Life and career ==
Born in Naples, Lina Sastri started acting in amateur dramatics at very young age. She made her professional debut with the theatrical company Teatro Libero, and had her breakout in 1974, starring in the musical drama Masaniello. On stage, she worked intensively with Giuseppe Patroni Griffi, and her collaborations include Eduardo De Filippo, Fabio Carpi and Memè Perlini.

Sastri made her film debut in I Am the Law, in 1977. In 1984 she won a Silver Ribbon for Best Actress and a David di Donatello in the same category for her performance in Where's Picone?. One year later, she won the same two awards for her role in Secrets Secrets. In 1987 she was awarded with a David di Donatello for Best Supporting Actress for Damiano Damiani's L'inchiesta.

As a singer she has released numerous albums, mainly sung in the Neapolitan dialect. She participated at the Sanremo Festival in 1992 with the song "Femmene 'e mare". She considers herself Roman Catholic.

== Partial filmography ==
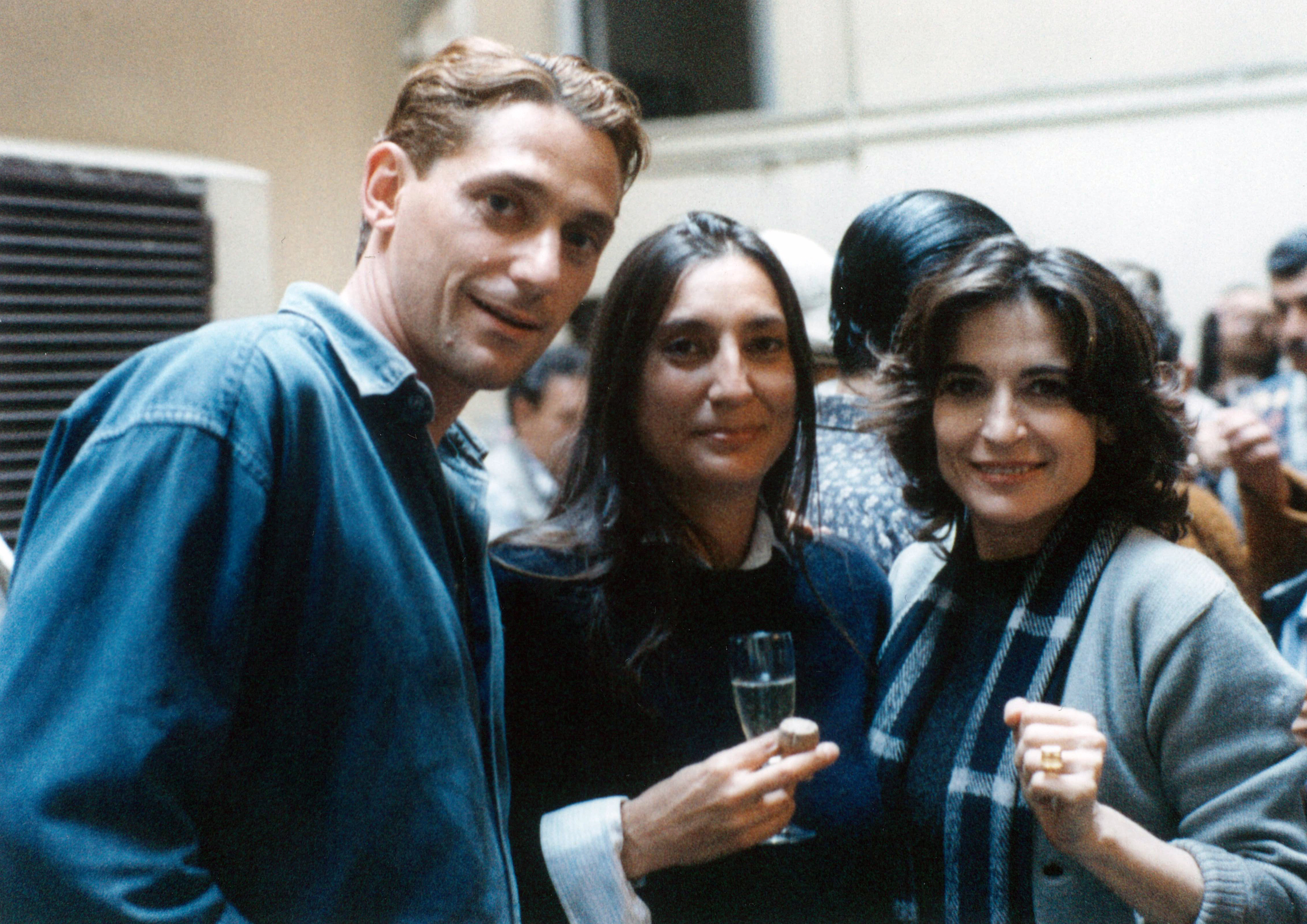
Lina Sastri (right) on the set of Celluloide, Rome, Italy, 1996

- I Am the Law (1977)
- Ecce bombo (1978) - Olga
- Café Express (1980) – Suor Camilla
- Hearts and Armour (1983) – La Maga
- Where's Picone? (1984) – Luciella
- Secrets Secrets (1985) – Laura
- Woman of Wonders (1985) – Luisa
- The Inquiry (1987) – Mary of Magdala
- Le lunghe ombre (1987)
- La posta in gioco (1988) – Renata Fonte
- The Strangeness of Life (1988) – Renata Fonte
- Little Misunderstandings (1989) – Francesca
- Luisa, Carla, Lorenza e... le affettuose lontananze (1989) – Luisa
- Brown Bread Sandwiches (1989) – Giulia Buonanotte
- Women in Arms (1991)
- Celluloide (1996) – Anna Magnani
- Strangled Lives (1996) – Sauro
- Li chiamarono... briganti! (1999) – Corifea
- Excellent Cadavers (1999) – Mamma
- Giovani (2002) – Irene
- Saint John Bosco: Mission to Love (2004, TV Movie) – Margherita Bosco
- Saint Rita (2004, TV Movie) – Abbess
- Fabbrica (2005) – Madre Lina
- Imperium: Saint Peter (2005, TV Movie) – Mary
- Don't Waste Your Time, Johnny! (2007) – Vincenza Ciaramella
- K. Il bandito (2008) – Rita Santoro
- Baarìa (2009) – Tana / Beggard
- Passione (2010)
- Poker Generation (2012) – Lucia
- To Rome with Love (2012) – Friend at Cinema
- Discovery at Dawn (2012) – Marianna Dall'Acqua
- O sangue è quente da Bahia (2013)
- My Italy (2016)
- Prigioniero della mia libertà (2016) – G.I.P.
- Naples in Veils (2017) – Ludovica
- Buon Lavoro (2018)
- Vincenzo Malinconico, avvocato d'insuccesso (2022–present) – Assunta
