= Ugo Pirro =

Italian screenwriter and novelist

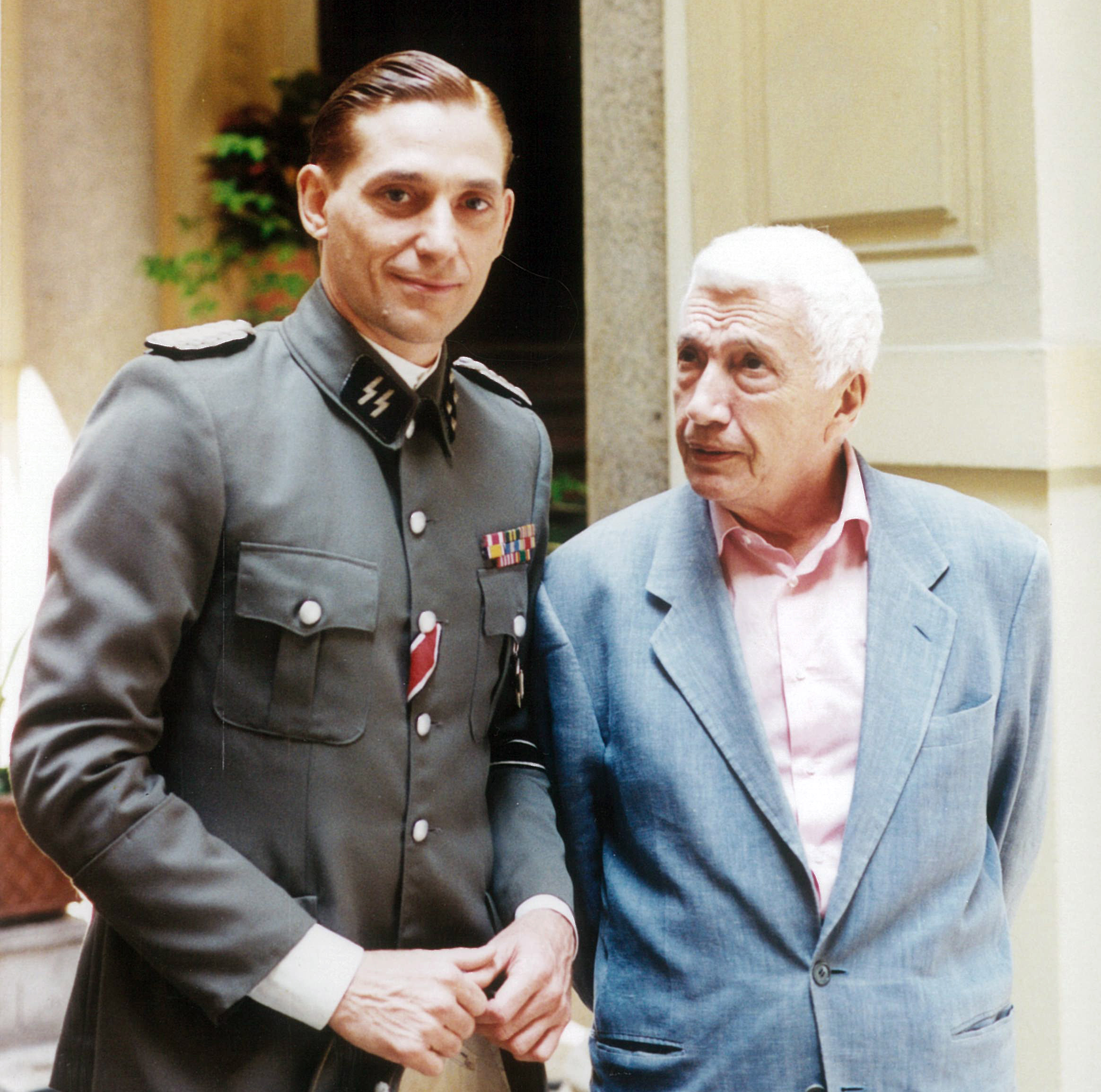
- Ugo Pirro (right) on the set of Celluloide, Rome 1996
- Born: Ugo Mattone; April 20, 1920; Salerno, Italy
- Died: January 18, 2008 (aged 87); Rome, Italy
- Occupation: Screenwriter, novelist
- Language: Italian
- Genre: Fiction, screenwriting

Ugo Pirro (April 20, 1920 – January 18, 2008) was an Italian screenwriter and novelist.

== Biography ==
Born Ugo Mattone in Battipaglia, near Salerno, he debuted as screenwriter for director Carlo Lizzani (Attention! Bandits!, 1951, and The Hunchback of Rome, 1960).

His screenplays of the 1970s include films Investigation of a Citizen Above Suspicion and The Garden of the Finzi-Continis, which both won the Academy Award for Best Foreign Film, with Pirro being nominated for Academy Awards for Best Original Screenplay and Best Adapted Screenplay respectively as a part of separate writing duos.

Pirro was also a literature author, his most notable works being The Camp Followers (1956), set in the Italian occupation of Greece during World War II, and Celluloide, adapted for cinema by Lizzani in 1996.

Pirro died in Rome in 2008.

== Works ==
=== Films ===
- Attention! Bandits! (1951)
- Empty Eyes (1953)
- Songs of Italy (1955)
- The Wolves (1956)
- L'amore più bello (1957)
- The Most Wonderful Moment (1957)
- Cerasella (1959)
- The Hunchback of Rome (1960)
- La garçonnière (1960)
- 5 Branded Women (1960)
- Warriors Five (1962)
- The Verona Trial (1963)
- The Camp Followers (1965)
- Wake Up and Die (1966)
- Navajo Joe (1966)
- We Still Kill the Old Way (1967)
- The Wild Eye (1967)
- Sardinia Kidnapped (1968)
- The Day of the Owl (1968)
- The Bandit (1969)
- Battle of Neretva (1969)
- Metello (1970)
- Investigation of a Citizen Above Suspicion (1970)
- The Garden of the Finzi-Continis (1970)
- The Working Class Goes to Heaven (1971)
- Chronicle of a Homicide (1972)
- Il generale dorme in piedi (1972)
- One Russian Summer (1973)
- Property Is No Longer a Theft (1973)
- Battle of Sutjeska (1973)
- Somewhere Beyond Love (1974)
- Blood Brothers (1974)
- Paolo Barca, Schoolteacher and Weekend Nudist (1975)
- Colpita da improvviso benessere (1975)
- San Babila-8 P.M. (1976)
- The Inheritance (1976)
- I Am the Law (1977)
- Goodnight, Ladies and Gentlemen (1978)
- Enfantasme (1978)
- Povratak (1979)
- Ogro (1979)
- Cronaca nera (1987)
- A Boy from Calabria (1987)
- Obbligo di giocare - Zugzwang (1990)
- Funes, a Great Love (1993)
- Law of Courage (1994)
- Celluloide (1996)
- The Nymph (1996)

=== Television ===
- Nucleo zero (1984)
- Mio figlio non sa leggere (1984)
- Gioco di società (1989)
- Piazza di Spagna (1993)
- La famiglia Ricordi (1993)
- Il prezzo del denaro (1995)

=== Novels ===
- The Camp Followers (1956)
- Mille tradimenti (1959)
- Jovanka e le altre (1960)
- Mio figlio non sa leggere (1981)
- Il luogo dei delitti (1991)
- Osteria dei pittori (1994)
- Celluloide (1995)
- Soltanto un nome sui titoli di testa (1998)
- Figli di ferroviere (1999)
- Per scrivere un film (2001)
- Il cinema della nostra vita (2001)
