= Celluloide =

- Italian theatrical release poster by Renato Casaro
- Directed by: Carlo Lizzani
- Screenplay by: Furio Scarpelli; Ugo Pirro; Carlo Lizzani
- Story by: Ugo Pirro; Furio Scarpelli
- Based on: Celluloide by Ugo Pirro
- Produced by: Pio Angeletti; Adriano de Micheli
- Starring: Giancarlo Giannini; Massimo Ghini; Anna Falchi; Massimo Dapporto; Antonello Fassari; Milva; Lina Sastri
- Cinematography: Giorgio Di Battista
- Edited by: Alberto Gallitti
- Music by: Manuel De Sica
- Production companies: Dean Film; Production Group; Istituto Luce
- Distributed by: Istituto Luce
- Release date: 26 January 1996
- Running time: 115 minutes
- Country: Italy
- Language: Italian
- Budget: L.6.5 billion
- Box office: L.239.6 million

Celluloide is a 1996 Italian historical drama film directed by Carlo Lizzani from a screenplay by Furio Scarpelli, Ugo Pirro and Lizzani, based on the 1983 novel of the same name by Pirro. It stars Giancarlo Giannini, Massimo Ghini, Anna Falchi, and Lina Sastri.

== Plot ==
The story revolves around the difficult production of Roberto Rossellini's film Rome, Open City (1945).

== Cast ==
- Giancarlo Giannini as Sergio Amidei
- Massimo Ghini as Roberto Rossellini
- Anna Falchi as Maria Michi
- Lina Sastri as Anna Magnani
- Massimo Dapporto as Giuseppe Amato
- Antonello Fassari as Aldo Fabrizi
- Milva as The Countess
- Christopher Walken as US Officer Rod E. Geiger
- Massimo Ciavarro as Massimo Serato
- Francesca Ventura as Jone Tuzi, the script supervisor
- Francesco Siciliano as Federico Fellini

Giuliano Montaldo has an uncredited cameo as Civalleri, one of the film's early financers.

== Production ==
The film was a passion project of Lizzani's, who tried to get it financed since 1983. Sabrina Ferilli was originally chosen to play Magnani, but ended up refusing. Principal photography began on 8 May 1995 in Rome.

== Accolades ==
Award	Date of ceremony	Category	Recipient(s)	Result	Ref.
David di Donatello Awards	9 June 1996	Best Film	Celluloide	Nominated	
David di Donatello Awards	9 June 1996	Best Director	Carlo Lizzani	Nominated	
David di Donatello Awards	9 June 1996	Best Actor	Giancarlo Giannini	Won	
David di Donatello Awards	9 June 1996	Best Actress	Lina Sastri	Nominated	
David di Donatello Awards	9 June 1996	Best Screenplay	Furio Scarpelli; Ugo Pirro; Carlo Lizzani	Won	
David di Donatello Awards	9 June 1996	Best Score	Manuel De Sica	Won	
David di Donatello Awards	9 June 1996	Best Costumes	Luciano Sagoni	Nominated	
Nastro d'Argento Awards	1997	Best Director	Carlo Lizzani	Nominated	
Nastro d'Argento Awards	1997	Best Costumes	Luciano Sagoni	Nominated	
Nastro d'Argento Awards	1997	Best Costumes	Luciano Sagoni	Nominated	
