= Girl with a Suitcase =

1961 film by Valerio Zurlini

- Italian theatrical release poster
- Italian: La ragazza con la valigia
- Directed by: Valerio Zurlini
- Written by: Leo Benvenuti; Piero De Bernardi; Enrico Medioli; Giuseppe Patroni Griffi; Valerio Zurlini
- Produced by: Maurizio Lodi-Fè
- Starring: Claudia Cardinale; Jacques Perrin; Luciana Angiolillo; Renato Baldini; Riccardo Garrone; Corrado Pani; Gian Maria Volonté; Romolo Valli
- Cinematography: Tino Santoni
- Edited by: Mario Serandrei
- Music by: Mario Nascimbene
- Production companies: Titanus; Société Générale de Cinématographie
- Distributed by: Titanus
- Release date: 9 February 1961 (Italy)
- Running time: 121 minutes
- Countries: Italy; France
- Language: Italian

Girl with a Suitcase (Italian: La ragazza con la valigia, French: La Fille à la valise) is a 1961 romantic drama film co-written and directed by Valerio Zurlini, starring Claudia Cardinale as a spirited but naive young woman who lives on the fluctuating good will of others. It was shown in competition at the 1961 Cannes Film Festival. In 2008, the film was included in the Italian Ministry of Cultural Heritage's 100 Italian films to be saved, a list of 100 films that "have changed the collective memory of the country between 1942 and 1978."

== Plot ==
Aida, a small-time nightclub singer, leaves her boyfriend Piero, a musician, for Marcello, a wealthy young nobleman. Marcello then dumps her at a garage with her suitcase. Aida, left alone and destitute, manages to track down Marcello, who had given her a false family name, at his family mansion in Parma. Unwilling to face Aida, Marcello sends his sixteen-year-old brother, Lorenzo, out to get rid of her. As instructed, Lorenzo claims not to know Marcello; however, he takes pity on the girl and brings her to a boarding house where she can spend the night.

Lorenzo becomes infatuated with Aida. While meant to be studying by day, but sneaks away to spend time with Aida instead and slips presents and money to her. One evening he stays drinking and dancing with people she has met, and bitterly realizes that her lifestyle involves getting kept by older men. The others eventually depart at midnight, leaving Lorenzo and Aida alone. When Lorenzo creeps home at dawn, his strict aunt spots him and his secret is out. Next time he is able to meet Aida, he comes up with convoluted lies to convince her that they can have a serious relationship. Aida meets Piero, who is willing to take her back, at the train station; she rejects him as she has come to believe that Lorenzo is a better option. Aida later reveals to Lorenzo that she has an illegitimate child who is currently away at a summer camp. When she agrees to meet Lorenzo later, the family priest appears instead and, after revealing to her that Lorenzo is Marcello's brother, asks her to leave the boy alone and leave the city.

Aida, still carrying her suitcase, goes to the seaside resort where Piero is working, and asks him for a job. Piero, still humiliated by her rejection, gets angry and slaps her. Romolo, a colleague of Piero, gets Aida drunk in an attempt to seduce her. He claims that he can help her career in show business. When she rejects his advances, he offers her money. At that moment Lorenzo, who has tracked her down, appears and asks Aida to come with him. A fight ensues between Romolo and Lorenzo; the brawny Romolo first pummels the smaller boy, but Lorenzo manages to punch him back until other people intervene to stop their fight. Aida takes Lorenzo to the beach and bathes his battered face. Able at last to spend some time together, Aida and Lorenzo kiss. But Lorenzo has to catch a train home at two in the morning; as they part at the station, he presses an envelope on Aida, saying that it contains a letter with everything he wanted to tell her. Opening it when he has gone, she finds a parting gift of money. Aida leaves the station and walks away.

== Cast ==
- Claudia Cardinale as Aida
- Jacques Perrin as Lorenzo Fainardi
- Luciana Angiolillo as Aunt
- Renato Baldini as Francia
- Riccardo Garrone as Romolo
- Elsa Albani as Lucia
- Corrado Pani as Marcello Fainardi
- Gian Maria Volonté as Piero
- Romolo Valli as Priest
- Enzo Garinei
- Ciccio Barbi as Crosia
- Nadia Bianchi as Nuccia
- Angela Portaluri
- Edda Soligo as teacher

== Production ==
Claudia Cardinale's voice was dubbed by Adriana Asti.
