= Amedeo Tommasi =

Italian pianist and composer (1935–2021)

- Born: 1 December 1935; Trieste, Kingdom of Italy
- Died: 13 April 2021 (aged 85); Rome, Italy
- Occupations: Pianist; Composer

Amedeo Tommasi (1 December 1935 – 13 April 2021) was an Italian pianist and composer. He specialized in the composition of music for films.

== Biography ==
Tommasi started his career as a trombonist for a jazz band in Bologna. He gained notoriety in Italy for his performances on the radio show La coppa di jazz in 1960. The following year, he performed in the Sanremo Music Festival and received the First Prize at the Festival Bled in Slovenia. In the years following, he made recordings with Chet Baker, Bobby Jaspar, René Thomas, Buddy Collette, Conte Candoli, and Jacques Pelzer. In the early 1970s, he began composing music for films. In the film The Legend of 1900, he composed each of the recordings and also had a cameo appearance as a pianist. He also appeared in the 2010 documentary Pupi Avati, ieri oggi domani, directed by Claudio Costa.

Amedeo Tommasi died in Rome on 13 April 2021 at the age of 85.

== Filmography ==
- Long Days of Hate (1968)
- Thomas e gli indemoniati (1970)
- Balsamus, l'uomo di Satana (1970)
- La mazurka del barone, della santa e del fico fiorone (1975)
- Le seminariste (1976)
- The House with Laughing Windows (1976)
- House of Pleasure for Women (1976)
- Tutti defunti... tranne i morti (1977)
- Le strelle nel fosso (1979)
- An American Love (1994)
- Sleepless (2001)
