= Le strelle nel fosso =

- Directed by: Pupi Avati
- Screenplay by: Pupi Avati; Cesare Bornazzini
- Story by: Pupi Avati; Maurizio Costanzo; Antonio Avati
- Produced by: Gianni Minervini; Antonio Avati
- Cinematography: Franco Delli Colli
- Edited by: Piera Gabutti
- Music by: Amedeo Tomassi
- Production company: A.M.A. Film
- Distributed by: Impegno Cinematografico
- Release date: 24 March 1979 (Italy)
- Running time: 104 minutes
- Country: Italy

Le strelle nel fosso (transl. The Stars in the Ditch) is a 1979 Italian film directed by Pupi Avati.

== Cast ==
- Lino Capolicchio as Silvano
- Gianni Cavina as Marione
- Carlo Delle Piane as Bracco
- Giulio Pizzirani as Marzio
- Roberta Paladini as Olimpia

== Production ==
Following the release of his autobiographical television film Jazz Band, director Pupi Avati conceived and shot his next film Le strelle nel fosso in July 1978. The film's story was developed while filming on a very low budget, with actor Giulio Pizzirani stating that he did not know anything about the script and that Pupi Avati gave the actors sheets of papers with lines to remember which he would repeat and occasionally improvise on. Pizzirani described the process as "traumatic". Cesare Bastelli, the assistant director on the film stated that he found an injured seagull while filming which led to Pupi Avati writing a scene where Cavina finds a bird and takes it into her kitchen.

== Release ==
Le strelle nel fosso was distributed theatrically in Italy by Impegno Cinematografico on 24 March 1979. The film grossed a total of 24 million Italian lire on its domestic release which Italian film historian and critic Roberto Curti describing the film as a financial flop.

== Reception ==
Critic Tullio Kezich wrote on the film, stating that even though Pupi Avati "returns to the Fantastic inspiration of his earliest and best experiments, loses along the way every naturalness and results in almost always manneristic excitement" Elliott Stein wrote on The Village Voice that "this elegiac fable is irresistible, and Avati's remarkable feeling for landscape has never been put to better use".
