= Valentino Macchi =

Italian actor

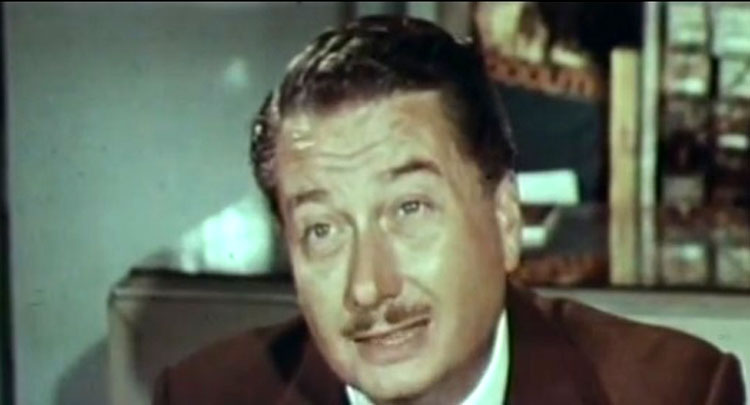
- Macchi in An Italian in America (1967)
- Born: 4 August 1937; Bologna, Italy
- Died: 19 March 2013 (aged 75); Rome, Italy
- Occupation: Actor
- Years active: 1962-2008

Valentino Macchi (4 August 1937 – 19 March 2013) was an Italian actor. He appeared in more than one hundred films from 1962 to 2008. His last appearance was in 2008 and died on March 19, 2013, at his home in Rome.

== Selected filmography ==
- 1962: Boccaccio '70 - Friend of Man Winning a Bottle (segment "La riffa") (uncredited)
- 1962: Sodoma e Gomorra - (uncredited)
- 1963: Uno strano tipo - Young Man at Fiesta (uncredited)
- 1964: Samson and His Mighty Challenge
- 1965: Man Called Gringo - Tim Walton
- 1965: Soldati e caporali - Caporale
- 1965: Salome '73
- 1965: Te lo leggo negli occhi
- 1966: Tecnica di un omicidio - Photographic Lab Assistant (uncredited)
- 1966: Web of Violence
- 1966: Yankee - Garcia
- 1966: Star Black
- 1966: Arizona Colt
- 1966: Zorro il ribelle - Ramon
- 1966: Seven Vengeful Women
- 1966: Che notte, ragazzi!
- 1966: Black Box Affair - Il mondo trema
- 1966: Sugar Colt
- 1966: Shoot Loud, Louder... I Don't Understand
- 1966: Django Shoots First
- 1966: Perry Grant, agente di ferro
- 1966: Last Man to Kill - Sergente di Polizia
- 1966: Il Natale che quasi non fu
- 1966: Navajo Joe - Gringo Scalphunter
- 1966: Superargo Versus Diabolicus
- 1966: È mezzanotte... butta giù il cadavere - Gianni
- 1966: I due sanculotti
- 1967: 7 Bullets for Gringo - Train Engineer
- 1967: Danger!! Death Ray - Henchman 'X3'
- 1967: The Three Fantastic Supermen - Golem's Engineer
- 1967: The 25th Hour
- 1967: The Witches - Man at Stadium (segment "Sera come le altre, Una")
- 1967: We Still Kill the Old Way
- 1967: The Taming of the Shrew - Complementary role
- 1967: Ballata da un miliardo
- 1967: Dick Smart 2.007
- 1967: Kommissar X - Drei grüne Hunde - (uncredited)
- 1967: Assicurasi vergine - Worker at oil wells
- 1967: Flashman
- 1967: La ragazza del bersagliere (1967) - Interpreter
- 1967: Killer Caliber .32 - Young Man in Coach
- 1967: 20.000 dollari sul 7
- 1967: Devilman Story - Escapee
- 1967: Poker with Pistols
- 1967: Golden Chameleon
- 1967: Assault on the State Treasure - Record Oil Company board member
- 1967: The Last Killer
- 1967: Tiffany Memorandum (1967) - Cunningham's Agent Disguised as a Nurse
- 1967: 'Gentleman Killer
- 1967: Quando dico che ti amo - The Recording Engineer
- 1967: Assassination
- 1967: The Stranger
- 1967: Virgin of the Jungle - Missionar
- 1967: Any Gun Can Play - Charro Ruiz
- 1967: Grand Slam
- 1967: Killer Kid
- 1967: How to Kill 400 Duponts
- 1967: Non Pensare a Me
- 1967: Death on the Run
- 1967: Bandidos
- 1967: More Than a Miracle
- 1967: An Italian in America
- 1967: Halleluja for Django
- 1967: The Girl and the General - Soldier (uncredited)
- 1967: Arabella
- 1967: Ghosts – Italian Style
- 1967: Two Faces of the Dollar - Lt. Laffan
- 1967: Soldati e capelloni - Un commilitone
- 1967: Non mi dire mai goodbye
- 1967: Your Turn to Die
- 1967: L'immensità (La ragazza del Paip's)
- 1967: Il ragazzo che sapeva amare
- 1967: I due vigili - Giuseppe, il maggiordomo
- 1967: Dirty Heroes
- 1968: Se vuoi vivere... spara!
- 1968: Superargo and the Faceless Giants - Bank Guard
- 1968: Acid - Delirio dei sensi
- 1968: The Young, the Evil and the Savage - Policeman
- 1968: Gunman Sent by God - Circus spectator
- 1968: The Sweet Body of Deborah - Garagista
- 1968: La notte è fatta per... rubare
- 1968: L'oro del mondo - Student
- 1968: King of Africa - (uncredited)
- 1968: Psychopath - Train conductor
- 1968: Come l'amore
- 1968: Il figlio di Aquila Nera - (uncredited)
- 1968: Faustina - Carabiniere
- 1968: Il diario segreto di una minorenne (è nata una donna)
- 1969: Il ragazzo che sorride - Party guest
- 1969: Gli infermieri della mutua - Un medico
- 1970: Balsamus, l'uomo di Satana - Man without an arm
- 1971: Sacco & Vanzetti - Uomo in sala di processo (uncredited)
- 1971: Il clan dei due Borsalini - Ladro
- 1972: Execution Squad - Policeman (uncredited)
- 1972: When Women Were Called Virgins - Servant of Varrone
- 1972: Il terrore con gli occhi storti - speaker TV
- 1972: Continuavano a chiamarli... er più e er meno - Prison Guard (uncredited)
- 1973: Non ho tempo
- 1973: The Bloody Hands of the Law
- 1974: Flavia the Heretic - Impaled Friar
- 1974: Il saprofita
- 1974: Conversation Piece
- 1975: La mazurka del barone, della santa e del fico fiorone - Petazzoni (voice, uncredited)
- 1975: Calling All Police Cars - Petrol Station Attendant
- 1975: Vergine, e di nome Maria
- 1975: Eye of the Cat - Collaborator with Cesare (uncredited)
- 1975: Il caso Raoul
- 1976: House of Pleasure for Women - Agente
- 1976: Rome Armed to the Teeth - Franco
- 1976: Free Hand for a Tough Cop - Policeman
- 1976: Goodnight, Ladies and Gentlemen - Interviewer of the Judge (uncredited)
- 1977: Tutti defunti... tranne i morti - Prete
- 1977: Stato interessante - Annabella's Wooer (second story)
- 1978: La banda del gobbo - Brigadiere
- 1993: Diary of a Maniac
- 1994: Oasi - Father-in-law
- 1998: Incontri proibiti - Portiere dell'albergo a Bologna
- 2003: Incantato
- 2004: Christmas Rematch - Controllore
- 2007: Codice silenzioso
