= Tutti defunti... tranne i morti =

- Directed by: Pupi Avati
- Screenplay by: Pupi Avati; Antonio Avati; Gianni Cavina; Maurizio Costanzo
- Story by: Pupi Avati; Antonio Avati; Gianni Cavina; Maurizio Costanzo
- Produced by: Gianni Minervini; Antonio Avati
- Starring: Gianni Cavina; Francesca Marciano; Carlo Delle Piano; Greta Vayan
- Cinematography: Pasquale Rachini
- Edited by: Maurizio Tedesco
- Music by: Amedeo Tommasi
- Production company: A.M.A. Film S.r.l.
- Distributed by: Euro International Film
- Release date: 10 March 1977 (Italy)
- Running time: 103 minutes
- Country: Italy

Tutti defunti... tranne i morti (transl. All Deceased...Except the Dead) is a 1977 film directed by Pupi Avati.

== Production ==
Following the release of The House with Laughing Windows, director Pupi Avati became anxious of his reputation as a director, stating that he was being described as the "Polanski of Po Valley'" which he did not like. Do this Avati developed his next film Tutti defunti...tranne i morti, which Italian film historian and critic Roberto Curti described as a combination of old dark house gothic, elements of Agatha Christie's Ten Little Indians, and tongue-in-cheek parodies of giallo. The story and screenwriting credits in the film are credited to Pupi Avati, his brother Antonio Avati, Gianni Cavina, and Maurizio Costanzo, Pupi Avati stated that "most ideas were mine" and that the screenwriters "did not follow a real method: we were trying to out do each other on who managed to reach the most absurd territory.

While casting for the film, the role of Buster played by Michele Mirabella was originally planned for Luigi Montefiori. Curti described the film as having a low budget with a small crew. The film was shot in the hills near Bologna and Modena in late 1976.

== Release ==
Tutti defunti...tranne i morti was distributed in Italy by Euro International film on 10 March 1977. The film grossed a total of 279,708,450 Italian lire on its domestic release.
