= The Hideout (2007 film) =

- Italian: Il Nascondiglio
- Directed by: Pupi Avati
- Written by: Pupi Avati
- Screenplay by: Francesco Marcucci (adaptation)
- Produced by: Antonio Avati
- Starring: Laura Morante; Rita Tushingham; Treat Williams; Burt Young; Yvonne Sciò
- Cinematography: Cesare Bastelli
- Music by: Riz Ortolani
- Production companies: Duea Film; Rai Cinema; Motion Pictures Midwest
- Distributed by: 01 Distribution (2007); Phoenicia Pictures (2008); Visual Factory (2008)
- Release date: 16 November 2007 (Italy)
- Running time: 100 minutes
- Countries: Italy; United States
- Languages: Italian; English

The Hideout (Italian: Il nascondiglio) is a 2007 Italian-American mystery film written and directed by Pupi Avati. It marked the comeback of Avati to the thriller genre (a genre he had successfully explored decades before in films such as The House with Laughing Windows and Zeder) after a series of intimate dramas and nostalgic comedies.

A more silent film from the Giallo Genre by Pupi Avati, the film plays with the dark, gloomy atmosphere of an old, spooky house and its deadly secrets.

The protagonist of the film spent 15 years of her life in a mental asylum, recovering from a nervous breakdown, after her husband committed suicide. With the intention to start a new life and to open a restaurant, she moves into an old, historical mansion. But she starts to feel she is not alone in this big, dark, building. Hearing frightening voices in the darkness and seeing things in the house, she starts to doubt her own mental sanity again, until she discovers a gruesome crime that happened 50 years ago and its horrible secret.

== Plot ==
One winter night, a young novice is brought back to the convents house by a chauffeur. He is saying the young girl doesn't feel well. Later on they found out she has been raped. The police is instantly informed but unwilling to do anything, as the offender seems to belong to a very rich family. The nuns are in rage and demand justice, while the rape-victim asks her befriended novice sister to help her, as the offender promised to marry her if she remains silent. Believing this lie, she tries to convince the other novice sister into helping her.

50 years later: A woman moves into the same house, after she spent 15 years in a mental asylum, due to a nervous breakdown caused by a heavy traumatic shock after her husband committed suicide. Her psychiatrist releases her from care, telling her to get in contact with him, if she starts to hear voices again. As her husband left her a good fortune, she decides to start a new life and to open restaurant in an old, historic mansion.

Moving in, the first incidents start to occur. As she steps into the house she suddenly starts to feel sick and seems to have a small panic attack. She ignores these signs, believing them into being leftovers from her old trauma. Even before the furniture is brought in, the first scary incident happens. Suddenly she starts to hear a gruesome voice in the house, singing and whispering when she's alone. As the scary incidents start to increase and her fear starts to grow, she is finally convinced that she is not alone in this big, dark house. She seeks help from a befriended priest and contacts her psychiatrist, but no one seems to believe her.

Completely alone, unable to get help, she starts to investigate by herself. As the electricity seems to not be working, she starts to search the entire house with a light bulb and finds cages with rats in the attic. She flees in terror that night. Unwilling and too stubborn to leave the house, she starts to investigate about the history of the house and finds out that it once belonged to the church as a boarding house for nuns and novices. Finally the electricians arrive. Before leaving, they mention to her that this house is known as the "Snake’s Hole" and known for its horrible past. She visits a local man, that tells her about a horrible murder case that occurred in this house 50 years ago: they found the bodies of three murdered convent women and two of the novices were missing and never found.

As the gruesome voice in the house gets louder and more dreadful, she contacts the priest again, believing there's some entity or ghost. He warns her and tells her to better leave the house at once, but as she has put all her money into the purchase of the house she cannot leave. As she starts to check the walls to find out where the voice comes from, she finds an old hidden, big ventilation system with tunnels that seem to run throughout the building. She can now clearly hear something moving through the ventilation-tunnels. She grabs into one of the ventilation gutters and pulls out a decomposed, human foot! As the mysteries about the murders in the house start to unravel, she finally starts to realise the horrible danger she is in.

== Cast ==
- Laura Morante as Francesca Sainati
- Rita Tushingham as Paula Hardyn
- Treat Williams as Father Amy
- Burt Young as Mueller
- Yvonne Sciò as Ella Murray
- Peter B. Soderberg as Las Shields
- Giovanni Lombardo Radice as Vincent
- Sydne Rome as Mrs. Wittenmeyer
- Angela Goodwin as Mother superior
- Cesare Cremonini as The crazy friend
- Kourtney Hansen as Murray's housemaid
- Chiara Tortorella as Egle Lanzillo
- Tom Rottger-Morgan as Lester Murray Jr.
- Marina Ninchi as Mrs. Shields
- Angela Pagano as Old Liuba
- Marin Jo Finerty as Young Liuba
- Jimmy Siokos as The cab driver
- Venantino Venantini

== Reception ==
The film was generally poorly received by critics. Variety's writer Jay Weissberg criticized the direction of Avati, marked as "incapable of turning the gothic into anything remotely interesting, delivering bland, predictable scenes devoid of tension". The Hollywood Reporter's critic Natasha Senjanovic noted the high kitsch value in the film, and blamed on the "implausible and illogical" plot twists. Italian film critic Paolo Mereghetti praised the cruel and non-obvious ending of the film chosen by Avati.
