= Franco Fontana =

Italian photographer (1933–2026)

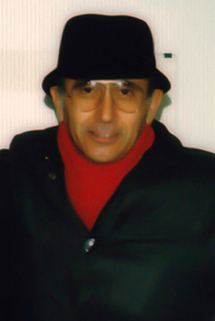
Fontana in 1982

Franco Fontana (9 December 1933 – 29 August 2026) was an Italian photographer. He was best known for his abstract colour landscapes.

== Early life and career ==
Franco Fontana was born in Modena on 9 December 1933. He started taking photographs in the 1950s when he was working as a decorator in a furniture showroom. In 1961, he joined a local amateur club in Modena. The experience would be a turning point in his career, and Fontana went on to have his first solo exhibition in 1965 at the Società Fotografica Subalpina, Turin and at the Galleria della Sala di Cultura in Modena in 1968. Subsequently, he participated in more than 400 group and solo exhibitions.

His first book, Skyline, was published in 1978 in France by Contrejour and in Italy by Punto e Virgola with a text by Helmut Gernsheim.

Fontana was the art director of the Toscana Fotofestival.

== Style and critical reception ==
Fontana was especially interested in the interplay of colours. His early innovations in color photography in the 1960s were stylistically disruptive. According to art critic Giuliana Scimé, Fontana "destroyed all the structures, practices, and technical choices within the Italian tradition." Fontana used a 35mm cameras, and as noted by Iwan Zahar, deployed distant viewpoints with telephoto lenses to flatten contours in a landscape of crops and fields into bands of intense, saturated colour. This is an effect that Franco Lefèvre has described as 'dialectical landscapism'. Of his use of colour in his 2019 retrospective exhibition Sintesi ('Synthesis') at Fondazione Modena Arti Visive, curator Diana Baldon observed;

“His bold geometric compositions are characterised by shimmering colours, level perspectives and a geometric-formalist and minimal language...By adopting this approach during the 1960s, Fontana injected a new vitality into the field of creative colour photography for then multicolour was not in fashion in art photography...The way Fontana shoots, dematerialises the objects photographed, which loose three-dimensionality and realism to become part of an abstract drawing”.

Aside from the rural landscape, Fontana applied his graphic sensibility to other subjects: city architecture, portraiture, fashion, still-life, and the nude.

Fontana's photographs have also been used as album cover art for records produced by the ECM Records jazz label.

== Death ==
Fontana died on 29 August 2026, at the age of 92.

== Permanent collections ==
- Art Gallery of New South Wales, Sydney
- George Eastman Museum, Rochester, New York
- The Israel Museum
- Kemper Art Museum
- Museum of Fine Arts, Houston
- Amon Carter Museum of American Art
- Rose Art Museum
- Richard M. Ross Art Museum
- George Eastman Museum
- Williams College Museum of Art
- Minneapolis Institute of Art
- Princeton University Art Museum
- National Museum, Beijing
- Stedelijk Museum Amsterdam
- Tokyo Photographic Art Museum
- Galleria Civica d'Arte Moderna e Contemporanea di Latina
- Turin Civic Gallery of Modern and Contemporary Art
- University of Michigan Museum of Art
- Victoria and Albert Museum, London

== Publications ==
- Modena una città, text by Pier Paolo Preti, Ruggeri, Modena 1970
- Terra da leggere, text by Pier Paolo Preti, IKS editrice, Modena 1974
- Bologna, Il volto della città, text by Pier Luigi Cervellati, Ricardo Franco Levi Editore, Modena 1975
- Laggiù gli uomini, text by Enzo Biagi, Ricardo Franco Levi Editore, Modena 1976
- Sky-line, text by Helmut Gernsheim, Punto e Virgola, Modena e Contrejour, Paris 1978
- Presenze veneziane, text by Achille Bonito Oliva e Angelo Schwarz, Maurizio Rossi Editore, Modena 1979
- Paesaggio urbano, text by Angelo Schwarz, Selezione d’Immagini, Milan 1980
- Presenza-Assenza, text by Giuliana Scimé, Selezione d’Immagini, Milan 1982
- I grandi fotografi, text by Achille Bonito Oliva e Giuliana Scimé, Fabbri Editori, Milan 1983
- Full Color, text by Guy Mandery, Contrejour, Paris 1983
- I primi dieci ristoranti e alberghi d’Italia, texts by Giovanni Agnelli e Giovanni Nuvoletti, La chiave d’oro Editrice, Modena 1983
- Los Grandes Fotografos, Ediciones Orbis, Barcelona 1983
- Capire domani 1933–1983, Edizione Stet, Florence 1983
- Meisterfotos Gestalten, text by Pier Paolo Preti, Verlag Laterna Magica, Munich 1983
- Piscina, Diapress, Milan 1984
- EU 42, text by Paolo Portoghesi, Rondanini, Rome 1984
- Franco Fontana, Nippon Geijutsu, Tokyo 1984
- I dogi della moda, Associazione Comitato Veneziamoda, 1984
- Disney World Epcot Center, text by Roy Disney, Edizioni Panini, Modena 1986
- Lui lavora lì, text by Liborio Termine, Edizioni Panini, Modena 1986
- Università Oggi, Edizione Opere Universitarie, Rome, 1986
- San Marino e il gioco delle apparenze, text by Sergio Zavoli, Cassa di Risparmio di RSM, San Marino, 1986
- Imola Imola, text by Aureliano Bassani, Edizioni Cerim, Imola, 1987
- Franco Fontana, text by Giuliana Scimé, Umberto Allemandi Editore, Turin, 1987
- Franco Fontana, Rebecchi, Modena, 1988
- Il corpo scoperto. Il nudo in fotografia, text by Daniela Palazzoli, Idea Books, Milan 1988
- L’universo nel piatto, Rebecchi, Modena, 1989
- I nudi di Franco Fontana in Polaroid, text by Liborio Termine, Aleph, Turin, 1989
- Invito a Bologna, text by Athos Vianelli, Magnus, Udine 1989
- Il carnevale di Viareggio, text by Alberto Bevilacqua, Mondadori Arte, Milan, 1989
- Kaleidoscope, text by Christian Caujolle e Franco Lefèvre, Edizioni Arte, Udine, 1990
- Franco Fontana è venuto una volta a Torino e l’ha vista così, Rebecchi, Modena, 1990
- Sakura, sogni paralleli, Cassa di Risparmi di Vignola, 1990
- 40 immagine inedite di Franco Fontana, text by Mauro Corradini e Giandomenico Semeraro, Edizione del Museo Ken Damy, Brescia, 1990
- Modena Effetto Notte, Graphis, Bologna, 1990
- Viaggio in Sicilia, Graphis, Bologna, 1992
- Modena effetto notte, Graphis, Bologna, 1992
- Universo nel piatto 2, Graphis, Bologna, 1993
- Aemilia, text by Candido Bonvicini, Edizioni Biblos, Padua 1993
- Landscape moments, Rebecchi, Modena, 1994
- Franco Fontana, text by Flaminio Gualdoni, Federico Motta Editore, Milan, 1994
- Le ricette erotiche, text by G. Bolognesi, Graphis, Bologna, 1995
- Franco Fontana Landscape, edizione limitata a cento copie, Ken Damy Polimedia, Brescia, 1996
- 100 fiori, simboli, messaggi di libertà, text by Lello Piazza, Mondadori, Milan, 1997
- Janua Urbis, A. Pizzi, 1997
- Polaroid, text by Francesco Guccini, Motta Fotografia, Milan, 1997
- Modena ieri e oggi, text by Michele Smargiassi, Associazione Giuseppe Panini, Modena, 1998
- Franco Fontana antologica, text by Giorgio Cortenova e Walter Guadagnini, Leonardo Arte, Milan, 2000
- Sorpresi nella luce americana, text by Giampiero Mughini, Federico Motta Editore, Milan, 2000
- Emerging Bodies Collezione Polaroid, Edizioni Stemmle, Zurich, 2000
- Emilia Romagna da gustare, text by Antonio Piccinardi, Giorgio Mondadori Editore, Milan, 2000
- Il paesaggio che verrà, text by Piero Angela e Giuseppe Pederiali, Panini, Modena 2000
- Historic Route 66, with Valerio Massimo Manfredi, Skira, Milan, 2002
- Franco Fontana, a cura di Giovanna Calvenzi, testo di Massimo Mussini, Federico Motta Editore, Milan, 2003
- Paesaggio, with Mario Giacomelli, text by Federico Zeri, Edizioni Gribaudo, Asti, 2003
- Antiche penombre in controluce, Franco Cosimo Panini Editore, Modena, 2003
- Retrospettiva, text by Allan D. Coleman e Giuliana Scimé, Edizioni Logos, Modena, 2003
- Appia Regina viarum, text by Valerio Massimo Manfredi, Trnsmec, 2003
- Paesaggi con Andrea Micheli Galleria degli animali, text by Renato Barilli e Giorgio Celli, Mazzotta Editore, Milan, 2005
- Appunti siciliani, text by Liborio Termine e Gianni Riotta, Federico Motta Editore, Milan, 2006
- La via Emilia, text by Francesco Guccini e Valerio Massimo Manfredi, Atlante, Bazzano, 2006
- Il tempo fissato. Pietre e colori a Morgantina, text by Vincenzo Consolo e Liborio Termine, Ed. Università Kore, 2006
- Alassio, Comune di Alassio, 2008
- Fabbriche di sassi, with Luigi Ottani, Anna Prandi, Edizioni Artestampa, Modena, 2008
- Modena effetto notte, reloaded, Ed. italiana e inglese, Edizioni Artestampa, Modena, 2009
- Paesaggi a confronto, Edizioni Artestampa, Modena, 2010
- Donne, Franco Cosimo Panini Editore, Modena, 2010
- Grandi autori, Fotografia contemporanea, edited by Claudio Pastrone, Fiaf, Turin, 2011
- L’anima un paesaggio interiore, text by Giorgio Faletti e Liborio Termine, 24 Ore Cultura, Gruppo 24 Ore, Milan, 2011
- Skyline, texts by Claude Nori and Francesco Zanot, Contrasto due, Rome, 2013
- Franco Fontana. A life of photos, Italian and English editions, Postcart, Rome, 2013
- Bellezze Disarmoniche, Artestampa, 2014
- Franco Fontana – FULL COLOR, Ediz. Marsilio, Venice, 2014
- Vita Nova, Ediz. Sabrina Raffaghello, 2014
- Vista d'Autore, Canon-EXPO, 2015
- Terra Alma et Amara, 100 numbered copies signed with a poem by Valerio Massimo Manfredi, 2015
- La Fotografia Creativa, Mondadori, Milan
- Italia a Scatti Il Racconto di Grandi Fotografi, Electa, Milan
