= Help Me Dream =

- Directed by: Pupi Avati
- Written by: Pupi Avati
- Produced by: Antonio Avati; Pupi Avati; Gianni Minervini
- Starring: Mariangela Melato; Anthony Franciosa; Orazio Orlando
- Cinematography: Franco Delli Colli
- Edited by: Amedeo Salfa
- Music by: Riz Ortolani
- Production companies: A.M.A. Film; Rai 1
- Distributed by: Titanus
- Release date: 26 March 1981
- Running time: 112 minutes
- Country: Italy
- Language: Italian

Help Me Dream (Italian: Aiutami a sognare) is a 1981 Italian romance film directed by Pupi Avati and starring Mariangela Melato, Anthony Franciosa and Orazio Orlando.

For this film Mariangela Melato was awarded with a David di Donatello for Best Actress and a Nastro d'Argento in the same category. The musical score of Riz Ortolani won the Nastro d'Argento for Best Score.

In 1943 during the Second World War a woman leaves Bologna to escape the bombing raids and goes to live in her country villa.

== Main cast ==
- Mariangela Melato as Francesca
- Anthony Franciosa as Ray
- Orazio Orlando as Guido
- Jean-Pierre Léaud as Mario
- Paola Pitagora as Giovanna
- Alexandra Stewart as Magda
- Franca Tamantini as Tonina
- Vincenzo Crocitti
- Anna Melato

== Bibliography ==
- Antonio Maraldi. Il cinema di Pupi Avati. Il ponte vecchio, 2003.
