= Fiorella Mancini =

Italian performance artist (died 2021)

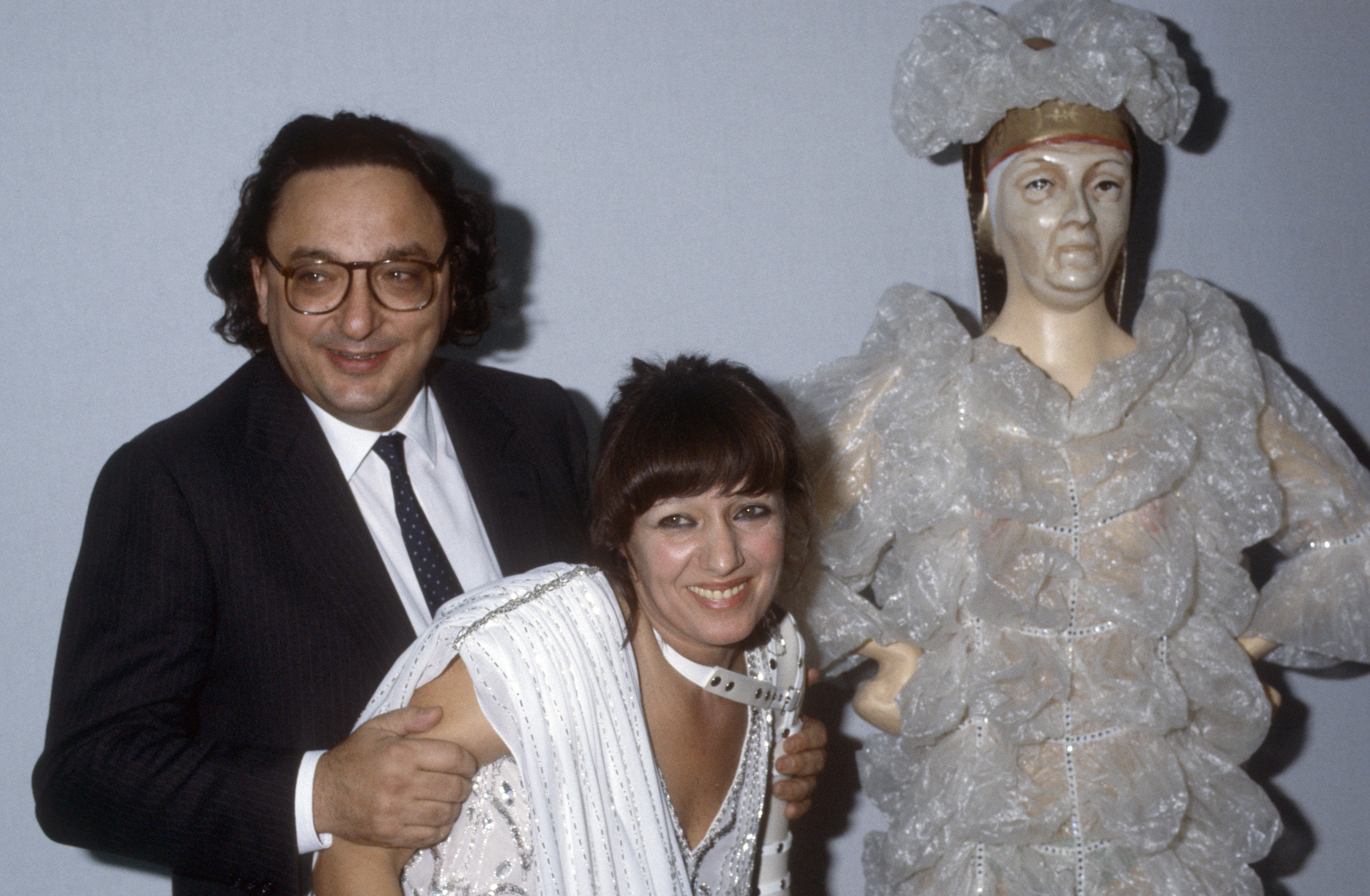
- Mancini (center) with Gianni De Michelis
- Born: 28 November 1943; Ferrara, Italy
- Died: 2021; Preganziol, Italy
- Spouse: Plinio Danieli
- Website: www.fiorellagallery.com

Fiorella Mancini was an Italian performance artist and designer, known for her highly provocative style.

== Early life ==
Fiorella Mancini was born in Ferrara, Italy.

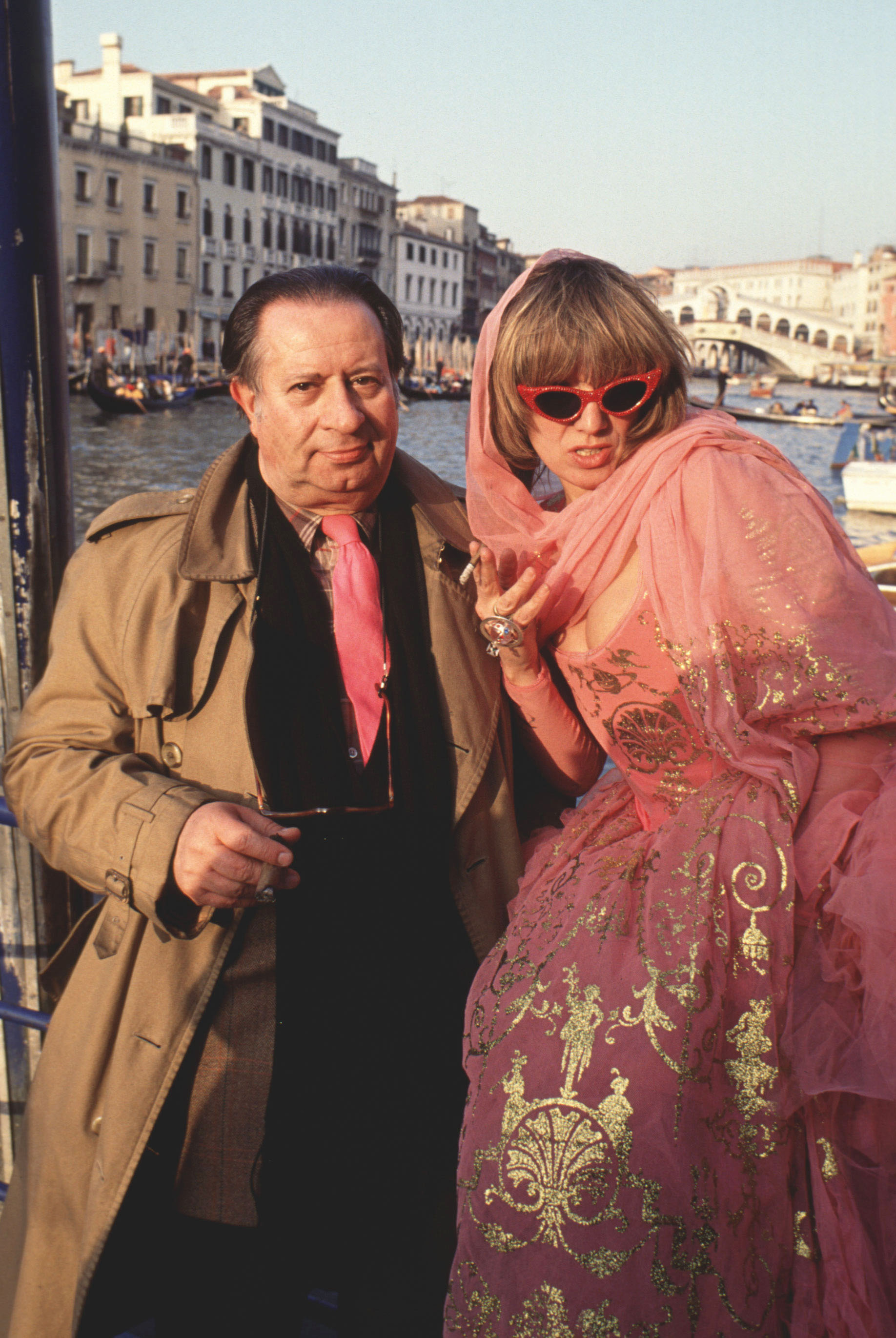
Fiorella Mancini with Tinto Brass

== Career ==
Mancini opened gallery-atelier in Campo Santo Stefano in Venice in 1968. The atelier provided designs and costumes for Elton John, Sting, Guy Laliberté, Philippe Starck, François Pinault and Damien Hirst. In the gallery Mancini also exhibited works by prominent Italian and international designers and artists, such as Gaetano Pesce, Ettore Sottsass, Mario Schifano, Rod Dudley, Ludovico de Luigi, and GKBodanza.

There was no borderline between fashion and art within Fiorella Mancini's creative world. In one 1981 performance, to denounce the deterioration of Venice, she installed a sculpture of a giant mouse on a boat which passed through the canals of Venice, led by people wearing a mask made of stuffed pigeons. That year she also threw several legendary parties, including the Pink Prison Party or the Cat International Party.

Mancini also organized and curated several exhibitions, such as I Dogi della Moda in 1984, which was exhibited at Palazzo Grassi during the period in which she was president of the Veneziamoda Committee. Twenty of the most influential designers of the time (including Armani and Vivienne Westwood), presented clothes focused on the theme of disguise on mannequins sculpted by the Australian artist Rod Dudley, with the heads of twenty doges placed on a stylized female body. Visitors were accompanied by guides carrying giant bee sculptures on their backs. Photographer Franco Fontana documented the exhibition, and his photos were included in the exhibition catalog. The exhibition also toured several museums, including Ara Pacis Museum in Rome.

Mancini also protested against institutional organisations. In 2005, for example, she held an anti-Biennial exhibition in her atelier. Under a neon sign that read "bed and breakfast", two men in their underwear shared a bed for five days, like a kind of reality show in the window instead of on the screen. The absence of taboos was her trademark, which led her to mix culture and pop references, glamour and punk, sacred and profane, and courtly and histrionic spirit.

Fiorella Mancini died in 2021 at the age of 78, and her gallery in Campo Stefano subsequently closed.

== Personal life ==
Mancini was married to architect Plinio Danieli.

== Awards ==
In 2008, Mancini received an award for her achievements in the fashion world from the Swiss National Chamber of Fashion.
