= Robert Swan (actor) =

American actor (1944–2023)

- Swan in The Untouchables (1987)
- Born: October 20, 1944; Chicago, Illinois, U.S.
- Died: August 9, 2023 (aged 78); Rolling Prairie, Indiana, U.S.
- Occupation: Actor
- Years active: 1970s–2012

Robert Swan (October 20, 1944 – August 9, 2023) was an American actor.

== Early life ==
Robert Swan was born and raised in Chicago, where he began acting on stage.

== Career ==
Swan later began appearing on film and television. He is best known for his roles in Hoosiers, The Untouchables, Natural Born Killers, and Backdraft. Swan also worked as a voice actor for television commercials and founded an opera company in Three Oaks, Michigan.

== Personal life and death ==
Swan lived in Rolling Prairie, Indiana, with his wife, Barbara. Swan died from liver cancer at his home on August 9, 2023, at the age of 78.

== Filmography ==
=== Film ===
Robert Swan film credits
Year	Title	Role	Notes
1980	Somewhere in Time	Stagehand with Note (1912)	
1981	Take This Job and Shove It	Virgil	
1983	Doctor Detroit	Seedy Biker	
1984	Grandview, U.S.A.	Fire Chief	
1985	That Was Then...This Is Now	Smitty	
1986	Hoosiers	Rollin Butcher	
1987	The Untouchables	Mountie Captain	
1987	Who's That Girl	Detective Bellson	
1988	Betrayed	Dean	
1991	Backdraft	Willy - Bartender	
1992	The Babe	George Ruth Sr.	
1992	Mo' Money	Detective Lawrence	
1993	Rudy	Father Zajak	
1994	The Childhood Friend	Sortino	
1994	Natural Born Killers	Deputy Napalatoni	
1997	Going All the Way	Luke	
1997	Cold Night Into Dawn	Transit Authority Worker	
2004	C.S.A.: The Confederate States of America	'That's My Boy' Dad	
2012	The Owner	The Driver	(final film role)

=== Television ===
Robert Swan television credits
Year	Title	Role	Notes	Ref.
1979	The Duke	Unknown	Episode: "Long and Thin, Lorna Lynn"	
1981	Walking Tall	Warren	Episode: "The Fire Within"	
1981	The Misadventures of Sheriff Lobo	Danny	TV movie	
1984	The Dollmaker	Victor	TV movie	
1985	The Twilight Zone	Bob	Segment: "Nightcrawlers" (S1.E4)	
1986, 1987	Spenser: For Hire	Virgil Crebbs / Mike Kaminski	2 episodes	
1987	Stingray	Captain Thomas	1 episode	
1988	All My Children	Jeb Tidwell	1 episode	
1989	The Equalizer	Joe Halsey	Episode: "Suicide Squad"	
1989	A Caribbean Mystery	Greg Dyson	1 episode	
1993–1994	Missing Persons	Dan Manaher	1 episode	
