= Greta Vaillant =

French actress and author

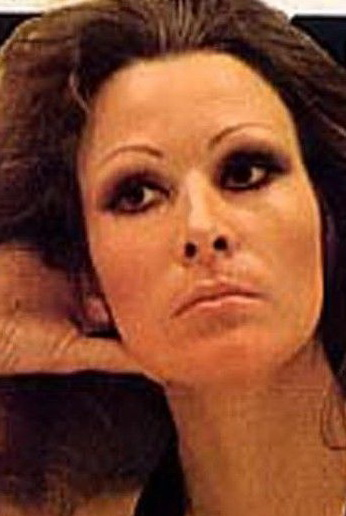
Greta Vaillant

Greta Vaillant (born Josette Vaillant In Rennes, Brittany, France; 1 January 1942 – 7 April 2000) was a French actress and author. She was sometimes credited as Greta Vayan and Gretta Vaillont.

Vaillant made her film debut in 1968, as main actress of Balsamus, l'uomo di Satana, the debut film of director Pupi Avati and actor Gianni Cavina. She worked again with Avati in House of Pleasure for Women and Tutti defunti... tranne i morti, and appeared in a number of Italian genre films, mainly commedie sexy all'italiana. In 1985, she was the main actress in the Barilla's commercial directed by Federico Fellini. In 2000, Vaillant wrote her only novel, Le géant des sable; she died of a heart attack a few weeks after its publication.
