= Nik Novecento =

Italian actor and television personality

- Born: Leonardo Sottani; 19 February 1964; Bologna
- Died: 15 October 1987 (aged 23); Rome
- Occupations: actor, television personality

Nik Novecento (19 February 1964 – 15 October 1987) was an Italian actor and television personality.

== Life and career ==
Born in Bologna as Leonardo Sottani, Novecento's career was launched by film director Pupi Avati, who discovered Novecento when he was working at a gas station; Novecento starred in six Avati's films between 1983 and 1987. Aside from his film career, Novecento gained some popularity as regular opinionist of Maurizio Costanzo Show and as television host of the Avati's TV-show Hamburger Serenade, broadcast by RaiUno in 1986. In October 1987, at 23, he suddenly died of a heart attack while he was in Rome at Avati's studios.

== Filmography ==
Year	Title	Role	Notes
1983	A School Outing	Baraldi	
1984	The Three of Us	Nicola	
1985	Bank Clerks	Nik	
1985	Graduation Party	Nicola Porelli	
1986	Una domenica sì	Nik	
1987	The Last Minute	Nik	
1988	The Strangeness of Life	Young Patient	
1988	Sposi	Davide	(final film role)
