= A Second Childhood =

2010 film

- Film poster
- Italian: Una sconfinata giovinezza
- Directed by: Pupi Avati
- Starring: Fabrizio Bentivoglio; Francesca Neri; Lino Capolicchio; Manuela Morabito; Erika Blanc; Serena Grandi; Gianni Cavina
- Cinematography: Pasquale Rachini
- Music by: Riz Ortolani
- Release date: 8 October 2010
- Running time: 98 minutes
- Country: Italy
- Language: Italian

A Second Childhood (Italian: Una sconfinata giovinezza, also known as Endless Youth) is a 2010 Italian drama film directed by Pupi Avati.

== Cast ==
- Fabrizio Bentivoglio: Lino Settembre
- Francesca Neri: Francesca
- Serena Grandi: Aunt Amabile
- Gianni Cavina: Preda
- Lino Capolicchio: Emilio
- Manuela Morabito: Teta
- Erika Blanc: The Widow
- Isabelle Adriani: Nicoletta
- Vincenzo Crocitti: Don Nico
