= Gianni Minervini =

Gianni Minervini may refer to:

- Gianni Minervini (swimmer)
- Gianni Minervini (producer)
