= Chouraqui =

Chouraqui (Hebrew: שוראקי) is a surname. Notable people with the surname include:

- André Chouraqui (1917–2007), Algerian-French lawyer, scholar, and politician
- Élie Chouraqui (born 1950), French director
