= The Friends at the Margherita Cafe =

- Directed by: Pupi Avati
- Written by: Pupi Avati
- Produced by: Antonio Avati
- Starring: Diego Abatantuono; Laura Chiatti; Fabio De Luigi; Luigi Lo Cascio; Neri Marcorè; Luisa Ranieri; Pierpaolo Zizzi; Gianni Cavina; Katia Ricciarelli
- Cinematography: Pasquale Rachini
- Edited by: Amedeo Salfa
- Music by: Lucio Dalla
- Release date: 3 April 2009
- Running time: 91 min
- Country: Italy
- Language: Italian

The Friends at the Margherita Cafe (Italian: Gli amici del bar Margherita, also known as The Friends of Bar Margherita) is a 2009 Italian comedy-drama film directed by Pupi Avati.

== Plot summary ==
Bologna, 1954. In the Margherita Cafè the young Taddeo meets a group of strange characters, led by the old Al. Al is a man who likes pretty girls, and soon Taddeo gets hired as his driver to take him to brave nights. While consume the stories of the other characters, who regularly go at the bar Margherita every day, Taddeo meets a beautiful librarian of his own age, and plans to marry her. However, the ambitions of the young Taddeo are too hasty, and so the fate repays him with a bad joke.

== Cast ==
- Diego Abatantuono: Al
- Neri Marcorè: Bep
- Laura Chiatti: Marcella
- Fabio De Luigi: Gian
- Luigi Lo Cascio: Manuelo
- Pierpaolo Zizzi: Taddeo
- Luisa Ranieri: Ninni
- Claudio Botosso: Zanchi
- Katia Ricciarelli: Mother of Taddeo
- Gianni Cavina: Grandpa Carlo
- Gianni Ippoliti: Sarti
