= Too Beautiful =

2005 Italian comedy film

- Troppo belli
- Directed by: Ugo Fabrizio Giordani
- Screenplay by: Maurizio Costanzo and Stefano Sudrié
- Story by: Maurizio Costanzo
- Produced by: Marco Poccioni, Marcello Montarsi and Marco Valsania
- Starring: Costantino Vitagliano; Daniele Interrante; Alessandra Pierelli; Kiara Tomaselli; Fausto Maria Sciarappa; Jennifer Poli; Fanny Cadeo; Luca Jurman; Ernesto Mahieux; Anna Melato
- Edited by: Paolo Benassi
- Music by: Adriano Pennino and Gigi D'Alessio
- Production companies: Medusa Film, Rodeo Drive
- Release date: April 22, 2005
- Running time: 97 minutes
- Country: Italy
- Language: Italian

Too Beautiful (Troppo belli) is a 2005 Italian comedy film directed by Ugo Fabrizio Giordani. Starring Costantino Vitagliano and Daniele Interrante, the film was conceived by Maurizio Costanzo, who co-wrote the screenplay with Stefano Sudriè. It was released in Italian theaters on April 22, 2005.

The protagonists of the film are Costantino and Daniele, two friends who dream of making a career in the film industry. Their lives change when they meet Valeria, an actress who, in collusion with her father, Dr. Giampalmi, deceives them by demanding large sums of money with the promise of introducing them to the entertainment industry. The two boys are assigned to Michela, Valeria’s sister, for a supposed acting course. However, Michela falls in love with Costantino and reveals the scam to him. The two boys manage to free themselves from the impostors, and Costantino begins a relationship with Michela.

The film was very negatively reviewed by Italian critics, who panned its acting and certain aspects of the plot. At the box office, it was a flop, earning 704,000 euros; in the same year, it was nominated for three "Fiaschi d'oro" awards, winning in the "Worst Actor" category for Vitagliano. Due to its poor box office performance and negative reviews, it is considered one of the worst Italian films ever made.

== Plot ==
Costantino and Daniele are two thirty-year-old friends leading an unremarkable life in a suburban neighborhood. Thanks to their good looks, they are very popular with local teenage girls, who chase them, taking photos with their phones or stealing their underwear. The two friends move from one job to another, but Daniele’s dream, supported by Costantino, is to make a career in the film industry. During an argument in a club, they are approached by a model-actress named Valeria, who, in collusion with her father, the fake talent agent Dr. Giampalmi, sells supposed "acting courses" promising students an easy career in show business.

The next morning, the two boys visit the doctor’s studio to create a photo portfolio, which will supposedly be sent to major modeling agencies to help them achieve their dreams. Giampalmi also assigns his younger daughter Michela, who has been secretly in love with Costantino for years, to teach them the secrets of cinema. Initially, Michela refuses to cooperate, but under pressure from her father, she agrees. Due to the high cost of the acting course, Costantino and Daniele are forced to work as bartenders, street cleaners, and later as dock workers, even resorting to borrowing money from their parents.

The evening after meeting Giampalmi, Costantino and Daniele go to a nightclub with their friend Claudio, Costantino’s ex-girlfriend Chiara, and Daniele’s girlfriend Isabella. During the evening, Isabella is approached by Vittorio, a mutual friend, sparking Daniele’s anger. Shortly afterward, Costantino and Daniele encounter Valeria again, still scouting for new talent, but the other two girls, jealous of her presence, leave. The next morning, Costantino tries to make amends with Chiara, but to no avail: she rushes to work, arrives late, and is reprimanded by her boss. Claudio intervenes to prevent Chiara from being fired, and she offers him a coffee in gratitude. This sparks a flirtation between the two.

Subsequently, Valeria secures the two friends their first opportunities to perform: the first time, she arranges a gig for them, though with the ulterior motive of securing an advertising contract for herself from a prominent entertainment figure, and the second time, she books them as strippers at a bachelorette party. Dr. Giampalmi, having collected the money, tries to get the boys to drop out of the course. Costantino decides to quit after arguing with Daniele. Daniele, meanwhile, is dumped by Isabella, who starts a relationship with Vittorio. Daniele realizes that Giampalmi’s course is a scam but decides to continue attending, so the doctor arranges individual lessons for him. Michela, having witnessed the two friends’ misfortunes, decides to help them and secures them a role in a film. By the end of the story, Costantino reconciles with Chiara, who invites him to her wedding with Claudio. During the ceremony, Costantino begins a relationship with Michela, and Daniele reconciles with Isabella.

== Production ==
=== Development ===
Following the success of the television program Uomini e Donne achieved by tronista Costantino Vitagliano, the Costanzo-De Filippi duo decided to cast Vitagliano and Daniele Interrante as protagonists in a film aimed at teenagers. The film was initially titled I belloni, but the production later opted for Troppo belli. During an interview, Maurizio Costanzo was asked if the film was inspired by Dino Risi’s Poveri ma belli, to which he replied, “Not only that film, but an entire genre of Italian comedy from the ‘50s and ‘60s”; he added that the film was not a remake of the latter. In contrast to Costanzo’s statements, producer Marco Poccioni clarified in an interview that the two films had nothing in common. Vitagliano stated that the title did not refer to his beauty but to all the opportunities that had been offered to him. Interrante also claimed that the title referred to the fact that “[...] it was really too beautiful for us to see a dream come true.”

The film, produced by Medusa Film and made by Marco Poccioni and Marco Valsania for Rodeo Drive, was financed by Maurizio Costanzo for two million euros. During an interview with the weekly magazine TV Sorrisi e Canzoni, Vitagliano revealed that his fee for the film was 10,000 euros, which he described as “very little” compared to what he earned for public appearances. Ugo Fabrizio Giordani, the film’s director, described it as an instant movie, as the screenplay, written by Costanzo and Stefano Sudriè, was completed in three weeks, pre-production took two weeks, and shooting was concluded in five weeks.

=== Filming ===
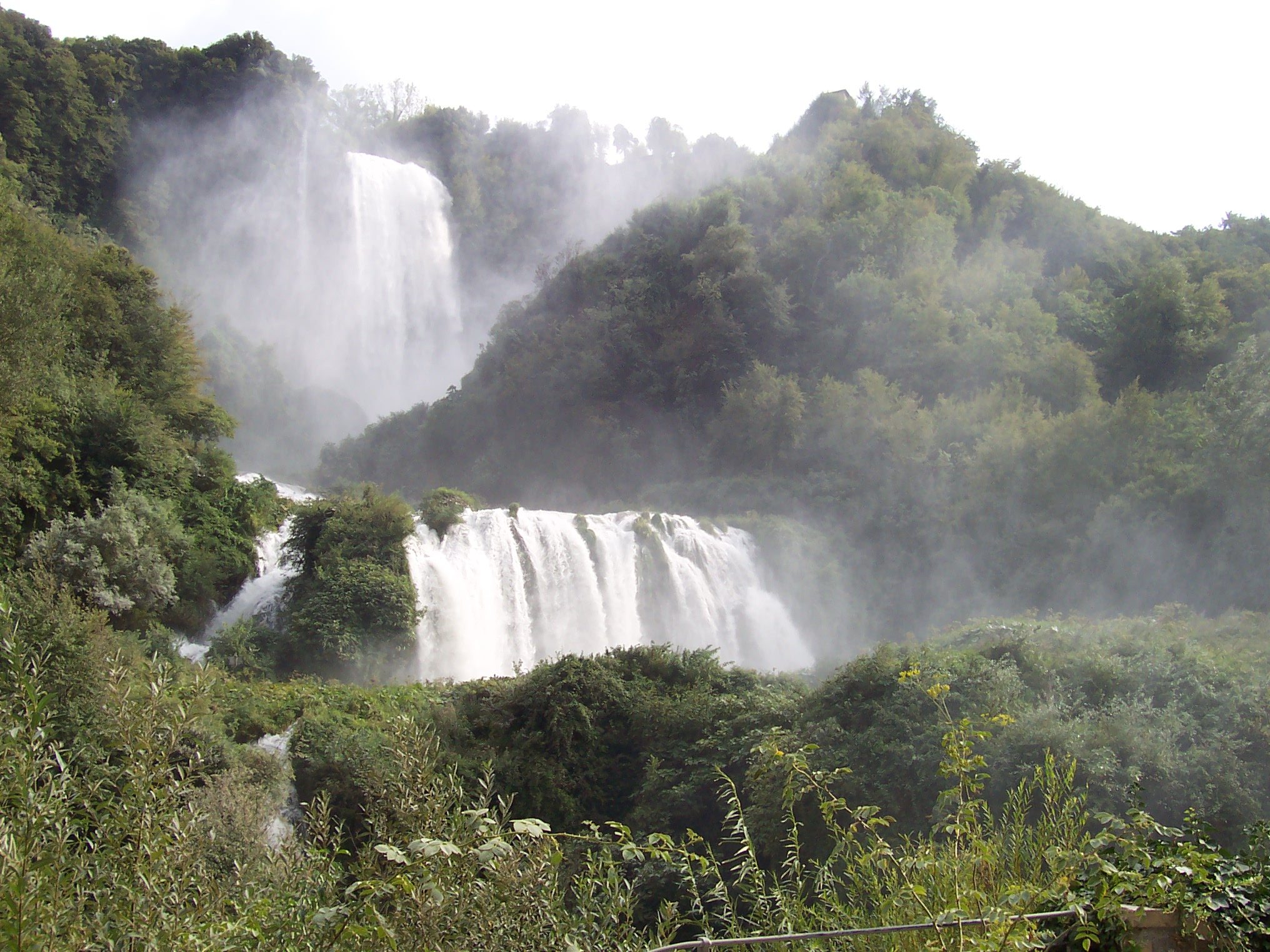
The Cascata delle Marmore, a natural setting previously popular on the big screen

Filming, primarily shot in Terni, began on January 10, 2005 and ended on February 13. Filming lasted about ten hours a day, from 6 a.m. to 3 p.m.

The scene of the meeting between Vitagliano, Pierelli, and Interrante was filmed at the Abacab nightclub in Narni Scalo, while other scenes were shot outdoors at the Mivida nightclub in Terni. The wedding scene takes place in the Chiesa di San Gemini. Other filming locations include the Videocentro, the E.Leclerc shopping center, and the Cascata delle Marmore in Terni. During an interview, Costanzo spoke about the filming and said, “You can’t imagine what’s happening in Terni on the set of the film,” referring to the behavior of the fans of the two protagonists.

== Soundtrack ==
The band Egoricarica was hired to perform during the final wedding scene. The band was chosen by director Ugo Fabrizio Giordani, who had previously directed their first music video, Voglio star con te. Three songs by Egoricarica were selected: Il brivido, Angelo perso, and Voglio star con te, which were included in the soundtrack composed by Gigi D'Alessio and Adriano Pennino for BMG. The film also features one song by D’Alessio, Quanti amori, and two by Anna Tatangelo, Dimmi dimmi and Quando due si lasciano. The latter was released as a digital download, and it was broadcast on the radio starting in May 2005. The live sound recording was handled by Mirko Pantalla, sound engineer, and Fabrizio Calzolaio, microphone operator, on behalf of LdE Produzioni. However, the soundtrack was never released due to the film’s poor public reception.

== Promotion ==
Both lead actors promoted the film: on April 21, the day of the premiere, they appeared at the Adriano cinema in Rome, then made stops on April 26 at the Dante cinema in Palermo, and finally on April 27 at the Med cinema in Naples.

During the premiere on April 21, Vitagliano was interviewed and said about the film’s release, “It will be a success, I’m sure because people want to see me, they’ve been following me for a long time. They’ll all be in the theaters.” Following the film’s failure, La Repubblica commented, “The good news is that those who go to the cinema don’t watch TV. The bad news is that those who watch TV don’t go to the cinema.”

The theatrical release of Troppo belli was preceded by a press conference without a screening, as the film was still in post-production. The Adnkronos agency suggested “the suspicion that there is fear of possible critical panning, ready to scrutinize the film written by Maurizio Costanzo and scripted by Stefano Sudriè.” During the press conference, controversy arose over the success-talent dichotomy, which many journalists felt the two actors did not embody. Interrante responded to the accusations, stating, “In this country, you don’t get ahead based on meritocracy but on popularity,” while Vitagliano replied, “I’m happy to be handsome because it allows me to do what I do,” adding, “If we weren’t Costantino and Daniele, people wouldn’t come to see us.”

== Distribution ==
Troppo belli was distributed in Italian theaters on April 22, 2005. Initially, the film was scheduled to be shown in 250 theaters, but Medusa Film later opted for a wider release due to demand from across Italy. However, after ten days of screening, the number of theaters showing the film dropped from 250 to 94 and then to zero a week later.

=== Censorship ===
The film was approved by censorship on April 19, 2005, with rating no. 98919, and received a "T" rating (suitable for all audiences).

=== Home video editions ===
The DVD of the film was released in Italy on July 6, 2006, by Medusa Home Entertainment. The disc contains the 97-minute theatrical version along with some special features, including the original trailer and a "behind-the-scenes" feature. The video format on the DVD is 1.85:1 anamorphic, with 5.1 audio in Italian and subtitles in Italian for the hearing impaired. The home video version was more successful than the theatrical release, selling approximately 900,000 copies, according to Vitagliano.

== Reception ==
=== Box office ===
The film was a box office flop, with earnings unable to cover the production costs, which were around two million euros. In its opening weekend, the film grossed 355,382 euros in 309 Italian theaters, with an average of 1,150 euros per theater. During its first week, the film earned 527,391.93 euros, reaching seventh place in the ranking of the most-watched films. Over its approximately three-week run, the film grossed 703,686.82 euros. By the end of the year, the film failed to enter the top 100 most-watched films of the 2004/2005 season, although it ranked 22nd in box office earnings for Italian-produced films that season.

=== Critical response ===
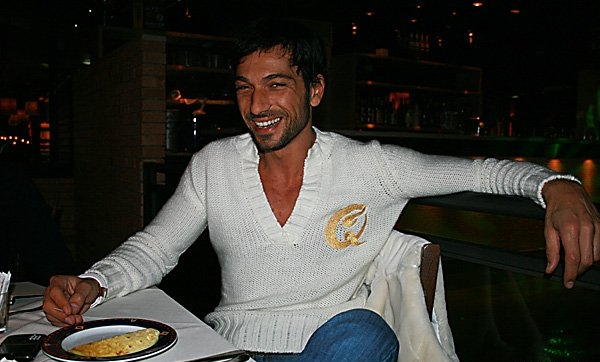
After the film’s failure, Vitagliano responded to critics, stating, “What flop? For me, it was a success: 900,000 videotapes sold, distributed in 280 theaters when an Oscar winner like Benigni’s film had only 230!”

The film received extremely negative reviews from Italian film critics, so much so that it is described as terrible in the MyMovies biographies of both actors. In Interrante’s biography, it is remembered as “one of the worst Italian films in circulation,” while in Vitagliano’s, it is described as a “terrible film about the biography of these two television personalities.” According to a survey conducted among readers of the monthly magazine Ciak, Troppo belli was the worst film of 2005, alongside the controversial Melissa P.. On the Internet Movie Database, Troppo belli has been in the “Bottom 100,” the ranking of films with the lowest user ratings on the site, since its theatrical release, even occupying the top spot at one point.

Andrea Chirichelli, in his MyMovies review, gave the film zero stars out of five, noting that “The film’s problem is that it just can’t manage to be self-ironic: the copious laughs are all unintentional.” Chirichelli concluded that “Surely in 30 years, someone will call it an ‘emblem of the past’ and cite it in a dictionary, but we, more prosaically, give it zero stars and send our regards.” The critic also pointed out an inconsistency: in the film, the protagonists wear designer clothes, while according to the plot, they clearly wouldn’t have the financial means to afford such attire. In the “Film TV” review, Aldo Fittante, like other critics, noted the similarity to Dino Risi’s Poveri ma belli from 1957, describing it as the pornographic version of the former. He also criticized the acting of the two protagonists and their “[...] dazed and expressionless looks.”

Antonello Sarno, in the newspaper Il Tempo, compared Costantino and Daniele to the boys who appeared in photo novels in the 1970s, adding that, in his opinion, the protagonists “[...] can do nothing but let themselves be photographed.” Alessandra Levantesi, in La Stampa, also noted the similarity to Poveri ma belli and criticized the film for “the idea that appearing is enough to be, that physical attractiveness is an absolute and winning value in itself,” concluding that “apart from the starting idea [...] which could have worked if properly developed, apart from some performances (Enrico Mahieux and Anna Melato), there is absolute zero.” The newspaper La Repubblica joined the negative reviews in its weekly film review section, recommending it to “fans of trash TV and UV lamps.”

Michele Porro, in his review for Corriere della Sera, gave the film a rating of 4 and criticized the quality of the acting: “They act with fixed stares, but some (Anna Melato and Mahleux [sic]) believe they’re in a real film,” adding that “the rest moves from ridiculous to boring, a TV story of clichés written below the minimum effort for the look.” The film is among those reviewed by the cinema dictionary Il Morandini, which gives it a mixed review and a negative rating of one and a half stars out of five. In addition to Italian critics, Troppo belli was also criticized by the American press. In the magazine Variety, journalist Jay Weissberg gave the film a negative review.

Troppo belli is often compared to Alex l'ariete, both films being poorly made and simultaneous financial failures. Mediaset, which acquired the film’s rights, never aired it in prime time: its first broadcast was on Canale 5 in the early afternoon of a summer Saturday.

== Awards ==
During the last edition of the "Fiaschi d'oro," the award given to the worst of Italian cinema, Troppo belli was the film with the most nominations in the 2005 edition, including worst film and worst actor for Vitagliano and Interrante. In the "Worst Film" category, it was surpassed by L'educazione sentimentale di Eugénie, while in the "Worst Actor" category, Vitagliano won. Fabio Fusco, commenting on the award, described Vitagliano as “[...] the icon of cathode nothingness, constructed at the desk by the Costanzo-De Filippi duo and spewed out by a TV made definitively unwatchable by reality shows.”

1. Fiasco d'oro for Worst Film: Troppo belli (Nominated)
2. Fiasco d'oro for Worst Actor: Costantino Vitagliano (Winner)
3. Fiasco d'oro for Worst Actor: Daniele Interrante (Nominated)

== Impact on the actors' careers ==
The film’s failure impacted the subsequent professional lives of Vitagliano and Interrante. In 2006, both made a brief appearance in the film Vita Smeralda directed by Jerry Calà. This film was also a failure and received negative reviews. While Interrante’s film career ended with Vita Smeralda, Vitagliano joined the cast of the independent horror film La morte di pietra in 2008 and the comedy Vacanze a Gallipoli in 2011, but neither was ever released in theaters.
