= André Chouraqui =

French-Algerian-Israeli lawyer, writer, scholar and politician

Nathan André Chouraqui
- נתן אנדרה שוראקי
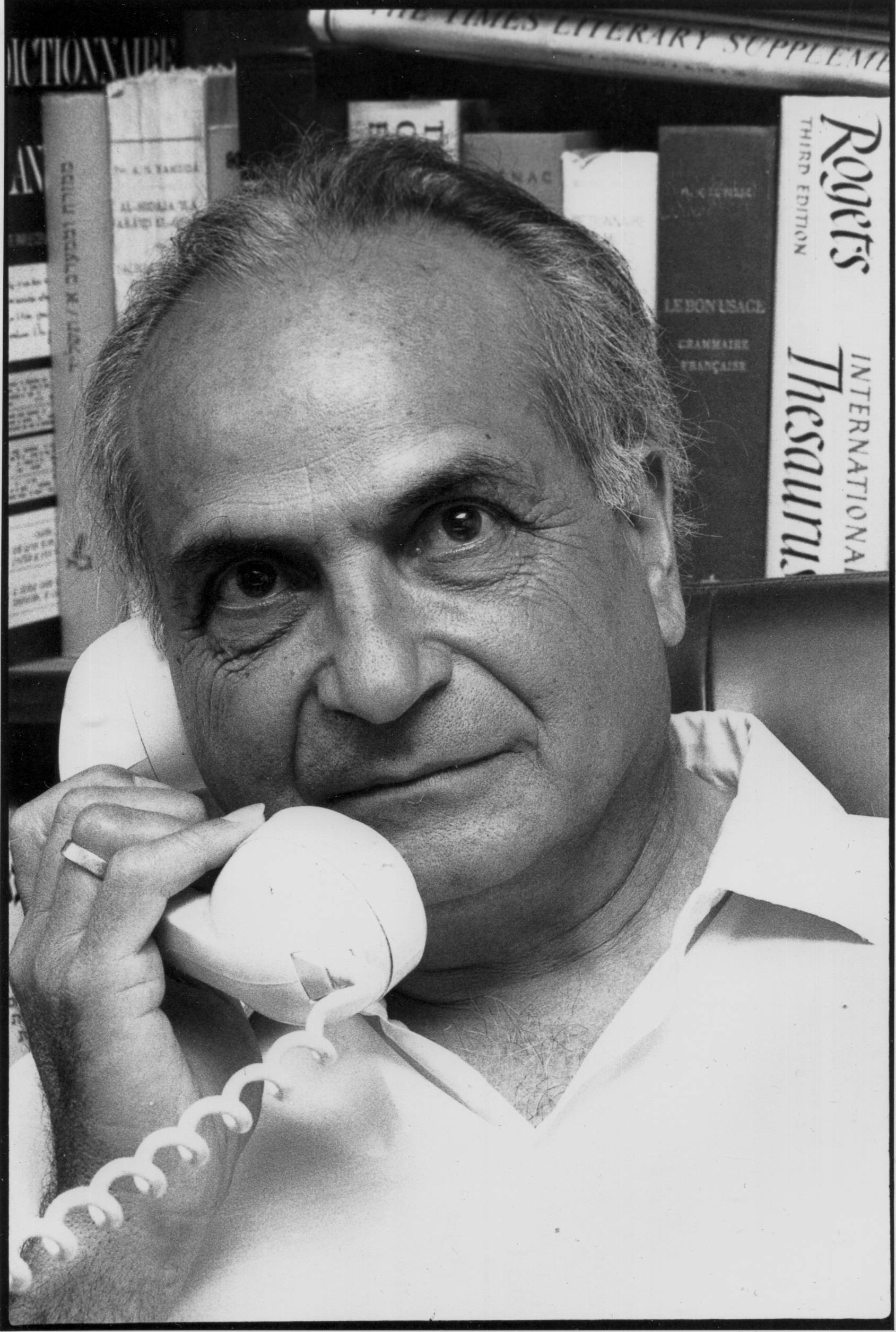
- André Chouraqui, 1979.

Deputy Mayor of Jerusalem
- In office 1965–1973

Municipal Counsellor and President of the Commission of Culture and Foreign Relations of Jerusalem
- In office 1969–1973

Personal details
- Born: Aïn Témouchent, Algeria
- Died: Jerusalem, Israel
- Spouse: Annette Lévy
- Children: Emmanuel, Elisabeth, Yaël, David, Mikhal
- Education: Law and Rabbinical Studies
- Alma mater: University of Paris
- Occupation: Lawyer, writer, scholar, politician

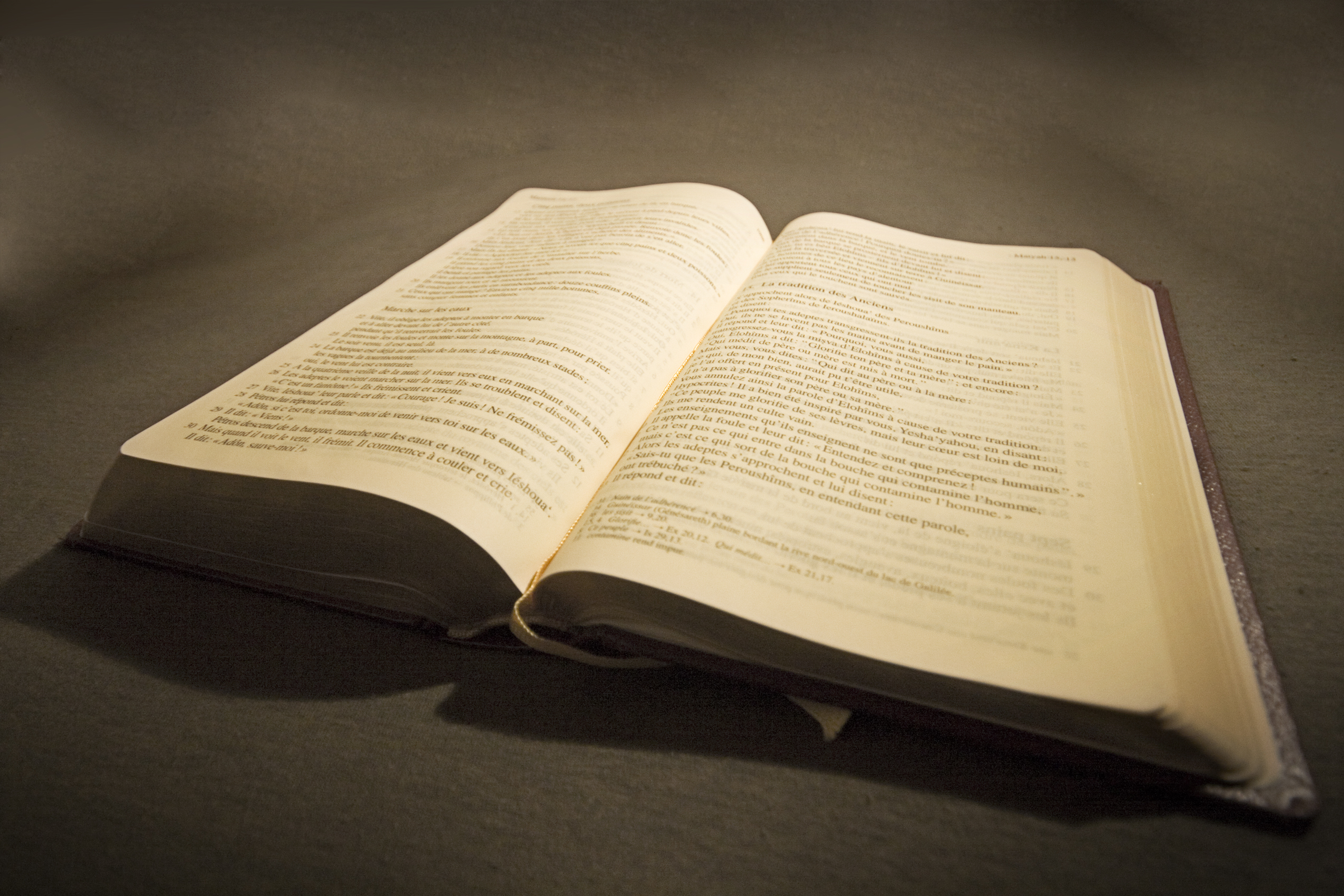
The Chouraqui Bible

Nathan André Chouraqui (Hebrew: נתן אנדרה שוראקי; 11 August 1917 – 9 July 2007) was a French-Algerian-Israeli lawyer, writer, scholar and politician.

== Early life ==
Chouraqui was born in Aïn Témouchent, Algeria. His parents, Isaac Chouraqui and Meleha Meyer, both descended from Spanish Jewish families who, as early as the 16th century, acted as judges, theologians, rabbis, poets and scientists in North Africa.

== Education ==
From 1935 he studied Law and Rabbinical Studies in Paris. He was active in the French Resistance in the Maquis of Central France (1942–1945). A lawyer and, later, a judge in the district of the Algiers Court of Appeal (1945–1947), Chouraqui became a Doctor of Law in 1948 (University of Paris).

== Career ==
From 1947 to 1953, Chouraqui served as Assistant Secretary General of the Alliance Israélite Universelle, then as Permanent Delegate for the Alliance israélite Universelle (1953–1982), under the presidency of René Cassin. He travelled extensively throughout the world, lecturing in over 80 countries. From Jerusalem, where he lived since 1958, he acted as a spokesman for French culture in Israel and as an ambassador for Judaism the world over.

Vice President of the Committee of Non-Governmental Organisations (of UNICEF-UNAC) 1950–1956, he proposed the project to fight against trachoma, a project which consequently saved the eyesight of millions of children around the world.

Settled in Jerusalem since 1958, he became advisor to Prime Minister David Ben-Gurion (1959–1963) on the integration in Israel of Jews from Muslim countries, and on intercommunity relations.

=== Deputy Mayor ===
Elected Deputy Mayor of Jerusalem in 1965 under Mayor Teddy Kollek, Chouraqui was in charge of cultural affairs, international and interconfessional relations of the City of Jerusalem. From 1969 to 1973 he served as Municipal Counsellor and President of the Commission of Culture and Foreign Relations of the city.

Since 1965, Chouraqui was Director of Sinaï Publication of the Presses Universitaires de France (Paris), which publishes works in French essential to Jewish culture, including Luzzato, Buber, Kaufmann, Halkin, and Maïmonides.

He was a member of the Tribunal of the World Zionist Organization, founding President of the Alliance Française of Jerusalem, President of the Israel Interfaith Committee, President of the Israeli Film Institute (Reginald Ford Foundation) and President of the Movement for a Middle East Confederation.

As member of the Executive Committee of the World Congress of Religions for Peace (1974–1983), Chouraqui took an active part in interfaith movements, and was active in the development of cross-cultural friendship, especially for fraternization between Jews, Christians and Muslims, through personal action.

== Publications ==
Chouraqui wrote hundreds of articles in the world press, numerous lectures and books concerning the spiritual and political problems raised by the resurrection of the State of Israel. Universal by essence, his writings range from poetry and theatre to legal studies, fiction to philosophical essays, history and sociology, and in particular the translation and exegesis of the Hebrew Bible, New Testament and the Koran.

His books have been translated into twenty-three languages and won numerous literary prizes: the Golden Medal of the French language given by the Académie Française (1977), two prizes given by the French Academy of Moral and Political Sciences, the Sévigné prize (1970), the prize of the Zadoc Kahn Foundation, the prize Henri Hertz of the University La Sorbonne (Paris, 1991), Doctor Honoris Causa of the Catholic University of Louvain (Belgium,1992), and the prize Leopold Lucas of the Evangelic University of Tübingen (Germany, 1993).

Prize Méditerranée for "Moïse" (France 1995). Prize Louis Weiss (France 1995). Prize Renaudot Essai for "Jérusalem, ville sanctuaire" (France 1997). Chouraqui has been awarded Commandeur of the "Légion d'Honneur" (1994), and Commandeur of Art and Letters (France, 1996), Officer of the National Order of the Ivory Coast (1970), Fighter against Nazism and National Fighter (two Israeli decorations), Freeman of the city of Jerusalem (1996). Price senator Giovanni Agnelli, International prize for the interfaith dialogue between the cultural universes (1999).

Chouraqui is known for his translations and commentaries in French of the primary spiritual works of the monotheist religions. His life's path (Algeria, France, Israel) has passed through the meeting points of peoples and their faiths (Judaism, Christianity and Islam). Faithful to his Hebraic roots as well as to his French and Arab sources, André Chouraqui belongs to a category of writers whose thoughts span several worlds.

== Personal life ==
In 1958, he married Annette Lévy. They have five children: Emmanuel, Elisabeth, Yaël, David and Mikhal, as well as fourteen grandchildren. He died in Jerusalem in 2007.

== Additional reading ==
- D. Corcos, art. "Chouraqui (André)" in Encyclopaedia Judaïca, T. 5, 1971, p. 503–504.
- R. de Tryon-Montalembert, André Chouraqui, homme de Jérusalem, Ed. le Cerf, 1979.
- Dictionnaire des Religions, p. 279, P.U.F. Paris 1984.
- Cyril Aslanov, Pour comprendre la Bible: la Leçon d'André Chouraqui, Ed. Le Rocher 1999.
- L'Amour fort comme la mort, autobiography, Laffont 1990, Pocket Book 1995, le Rocher 1998.
- Chouraqui, A., La Bible et Le Coran D'André Chouraqui En Ligne (in French)
