= Pugili =

- Directed by: Lino Capolicchio
- Written by: Lino Capolicchio
- Produced by: Gianluca Arcopinto; Francesco Di Giacinto
- Starring: Antonella Attili; Sara Di Giacinto; Pierfrancesco Favino; Gianfelice Imparato
- Cinematography: Arnaldo Catinari
- Edited by: Luca Benedetti
- Release date: November 1995
- Running time: 110 minutes
- Country: Italy
- Language: Italian

Pugili (Italian: Boxers) is a 1995 Italian sports film directed by Lino Capolicchio, focusing on the world of boxing.

The movie won a FIPRESCI Prize in 1995.

== Cast ==
- Antonella Attili
- Sara Di Giacinto
- Pierfrancesco Favino - pugilist
- Gianfelice Imparato
- Letizia Generoso
- Raffaele Angelino
- Duilio Loi - himself
- Franco Mescolini
- Tiberio Mitri
- Bobby Rhodes

== See also ==
- List of sports films
