= Graduation Party =

- Directed by: Pupi Avati
- Cinematography: Roberto D'Ettore
- Music by: Riz Ortolani
- Release date: 1985
- Country: Italy
- Language: Italian

Festa di laurea, internationally released as Graduation Party, is a 1985 Italian drama film directed by Pupi Avati. For his soundtrack Riz Ortolani won a Nastro d'Argento for Best Score.

== Plot ==
Romagna countryside, 1950, near the sea. The baker Vanni Porelli is commissioned to organize the graduation party of Mrs. Gaia's daughter in a dilapidated abandoned farmhouse. The work is difficult and the woman refuses to pay even an advance, but Vanni accepts, because ten years earlier, on the occasion of the 1940 declaration of war, he had been kissed by surprise by Gaia, with whose family the mother of him, and had been naively in love with him so much that he ended up separating from his wife.

Vanni gets to work, helped by his son Nicola, by two orphans adopted by his wife, by some evacuees who had illegally occupied the farmhouse and by other occasional collaborators. The party ends in disaster, totally disorganized and inadequate to Gaia's demands: in the end the man even refuses to be paid. The party remains a modest amateur film shot by the lawyer of the town.

== Cast ==
- Carlo Delle Piane as Vanni Porelli
- Aurore Clément as Gaia
- Lidia Broccolino as Sandra
- Nik Novecento as Nicola Porelli
- Fiorenza Tessari

== See also ==
- List of Italian films of 1985
