= The Three of Us (1984 film) =

- Directed by: Pupi Avati
- Cinematography: Pasquale Rachini
- Music by: Riz Ortolani
- Release date: 1984
- Country: Italy
- Language: Italian

The Three of Us (Italian: Noi tre) is a 1984 Italian comedy film directed by Pupi Avati. It entered the 41° Venice Film Festival, in which it won a special Lion for technical values.

== Cast ==
- Cristopher Davidson as Wolfgang "Amadè" Mozart
- Lino Capolicchio as Leopold Mozart
- Gianni Cavina as The cousin
- Carlo Schincaglia as The butler
- Carlo Delle Piane as Count Pallavicini
- Ida Di Benedetto as Maria Caterina Pallavicini
- Dario Parisini as Giuseppe Pallavicini
- Nik Novecento as Nicola
- Guido Pizzirani as Padre Martini
