= Un apprezzato professionista di sicuro avvenire =

1971 film directed by Giuseppe De Santis

- Directed by: Giuseppe De Santis
- Written by: Giuseppe De Santis; Giorgio Salvioni
- Starring: Lino Capolicchio
- Cinematography: Carlo Carlini
- Music by: Maurizio Vandelli
- Release date: 1971
- Language: Italian

Un apprezzato professionista di sicuro avvenire ("One Appreciated Professional of Sure Future") is a 1971 Italian drama film written and directed by Giuseppe De Santis. It is his last film.

== Plot ==
A young lawyer who married for money the wealthy daughter of a speculator discovers, on his wedding night, his impotence. A priest and childhood friend, Don Marco, would apparently solve the situation but things will soon turn to tragedy.

== Cast ==
- Lino Capolicchio: Vincenzo Arduni
- Riccardo Cucciolla: Nicola Parella
- Femi Benussi: Lucietta Arduni
- Robert Hoffmann: Don Marco
- Andrea Checchi: Vincenzo's Father
- Yvonne Sanson: Lucietta's Mother
- Ivo Garrani: Lucietta's Father
- Massimo Serato: Monsignor
- Nino Vingelli: Maresciallo
- Luisa De Santis: Maria, wife of Nicola
- Vittorio Duse: Marco's Father
- Lina Alberti: old woman in the bus
- Pietro Zardini: sacristan Giacomo
- Anna Maria Dossena: mother of don Marco
- Sergio Serafini: city councilor
- Stefania Fassio: girl in church
- Bruno Degni:
- Giulio Massimini:
- Ugo Carboni:
- Winni Riva:
- Bianca Mallerini Zardini:
- Rory Criscuolo:
- Daniela De Simone:
- Cesare De Vita:
- Enrico Papa:
- Letizia Lehir:
- Eugenio Galadini:
- Claudio Giorgiutti:
- Gian Carlo Piacentini:
- Tony Ventura:

== See also ==
- List of Italian films of 1971
