= Long Days of Hate =

1968 film

- Film poster
- Directed by: Gianfranco Baldanello
- Written by: Gianfranco Baldanello (writer); Luigi Emmanuele (writer); Gino Mangini (writer)
- Produced by: Alberto Marucchi (producer); Rossano Moscovini (assistant producer); Gino Rossi (producer)
- Starring: See below
- Cinematography: Claudio Cirillo
- Edited by: Alberto Gallitti
- Music by: Amedeo Tommasi
- Distributed by: Variety Distribution
- Release date: 5 April 1968
- Running time: 90 minutes (American DVD)
- Country: Italy
- Language: Italian

Long Days of Hate (Italian: I lunghi giorni dell'odio, also known as This Man Can't Die) is a 1968 Italian Spaghetti Western film co-written and directed by Gianfranco Baldanello.

== Plot summary ==
Martin Benson is a Civil War veteran and former outlaw earning money and clearing his name by working as an undercover agent for the US Army. His infiltration of a ring supplying firearms and firewater to Indians has led to the capture and execution of three of the gang, though they would not identify the gang's ringleader. Despite his monetary rewards and the three pistols and gun belts of the executed men that he has posted home to his father, who still believes him to be an outlaw, Benson wants no more of the undercover life. Benson's controller, an Army Captain still wants him to continue his work in order to identify the ringleader and gain the Captain promotion. Though the Captain has another agent, Tony Guy, the Captain prefers Benson's efficiency.

Outside the Army post Benson is unsuccessfully ambushed leading to more fatalities to the gang. The gang decides to revenge themselves on Benson and draw him out by massacring Benson's family. As Benson's sister Susy and two younger brothers are in town visiting Vic Graham who is romantically attracted to Susy, the gang strikes killing Benson's father and mother as well as a hired hand. They also rape Benson's young sister Jenny who is left mute due to shock. Upon their return Daniel, the older brother spies an unidentified wounded man who they take to a cave to nurse back to health so he can identify who was responsible for the outrage.

Martin Benson returns home and together with Daniel carry out their own revenge, retaliation and retribution as well as discovering the identity of the ringleader.

== Cast ==
- Guy Madison as Martin Benson
- Lucienne Bridou as Susy Benson
- Rik Battaglia as Vic Graham
- Rosalba Neri as Melina (Martin's Girl)
- Steve Merrick as Artie Benson
- Anna Liotti as Jenny Benson
- Gioia Desideri as Lillian
- Alberto Dell'Acqua as Daniel Benson
- Peter Martell as Tony Guy
- Silvana Jachino as Mrs. Benson
- Daniele Riccardi as Mr. Benson
- Attilio Dottesio as Doctor Parker
- John Bartha as Sheriff
- Gaetano Scala as Starnish
- Franco Gulà as John
- Franco Pesce as Barnaby
- Jlse Scholzel as Barnaby's wife
- Giovanni Ivan Scratuglia as Bruce
- Giovanni Querrel as Freight Clerk
- Fortunato Arena as Jack

== Soundtrack ==
The film was the first score of Italian composer Amedeo Tommasi, and his only Spaghetti Western. One of Tommasi's themes in the film features an unidentified vocalist, three themes are repeated throughout the film played by guitar and piano. As was the custom of several Spaghetti Westerns, a track from Ennio Morricone's A Fistful of Dollars features in the film.
