= Midsummer Night's Dance =

1999 Italian film

- Directed by: Pupi Avati
- Screenplay by: Pupi Avati; Antonio Avati
- Starring: Gianni Cavina; Valentina Cervi; Libero De Rienzo; Carlo Delle Piane
- Cinematography: Cesare Bastelli
- Edited by: Amedeo Salfa
- Music by: Riz Ortolani
- Distributed by: Medusa Film
- Release date: 1999
- Country: Italy
- Language: Italian

Midsummer Night's Dance (Italian: La via degli angeli, lit. 'The road of angels') is a 1999 Italian comedy film co-written and directed by Pupi Avati and starring Gianni Cavina, Valentina Cervi and Libero De Rienzo.

== Cast ==
- Gianni Cavina as Loris' brother
- Valentina Cervi as Ines
- Libero De Rienzo as Angelo
- Carlo Delle Piane as Nello Apicella
- Eliana Miglio as Enrichetta Simony
- Chiara Muti as Gabriella Simony
- Paola Saluzzi as Mirella di Budrio
- Mario Maranzana as Angelo's father
- Toni Santagata as Cacciapuoti
- Cinzia Mascoli as Pola
- Daniele Sirotti as Terzo
- Francesca Romana Coluzzi

== Production ==
The film was conceived by the Avati brothers as a tribute to their recently deceased mother, and their parents' love story served as the inspiration for the narrative.

== Reception ==
The film won the best screenplay trophy at the 2000 Montreal World Film Festival. The film also received Nastro d'Argento nominations for best actor (Gianni Cavina), best actress (Valentina Cervi) and best screenplay.

La Repubblica's film critic Irene Bignardi called the film "Avati's Amarcord", and referred to it as "one of the most enjoyable and successful outcomes of the recent Avati repertoire [...] regaining his most original qualities of observation and grace". Donna Pazdera from Sun Sentinel paired the film to Stealing Beauty, Like Water for Chocolate and Big Night, and described it as "charming" and "a fine, light outing".
