= The Last Minute (1987 film) =

- Directed by: Pupi Avati
- Written by: Pupi Avati; Antonio Avati; Italo Cucci
- Starring: Ugo Tognazzi; Massimo Bonetti; Elena Sofia Ricci; Diego Abatantuono
- Cinematography: Pasquale Rachini
- Edited by: Amedeo Salfa
- Music by: Riz Ortolani
- Release date: 1987
- Language: Italian

The Last Minute (Italian: Ultimo minuto) is a 1987 Italian comedy-drama film directed by Pupi Avati. The film won the David di Donatello for best sound (to Raffaele De Luca) and for best original song (to Riz Ortolani).

== Cast ==
- Ugo Tognazzi as Walter Ferroni
- Elena Sofia Ricci as Marta Ferroni
- Diego Abatantuono as Duccio Venturi
- Massimo Bonetti as Emilio Boschi
- Lino Capolicchio as Renzo Di Carlo
- Giovanna Maldotti as Egle Di Carlo
- Marco Leporatti as Di Carlo's son
- Luigi Diberti as Claudio Corti
- Nik Novecento as Nik
- Cesare Barbetti as Lele Costanzi
- Cinzia De Ponti as Boschi's wife
- Marco Leonardi as Paolo Tassoni
- Carlo Monni as Renato Angeloni
