= The Childhood Friend =

The Childhood Friend or L'amico d'infanzia is a 1994 film directed by Pupi Avati.

== Cast ==
- Jason Robards III: Arnold Gardner
- Amy Galper: Norma
- Jim Ortlieb: Eddie Greenberg
- Jim Mullins: Myers
- Joe Ryan: Ted Gardner
- Robert Swan: Sortino
