= Maurizio Costanzo =

Italian television presenter (1938–2023)

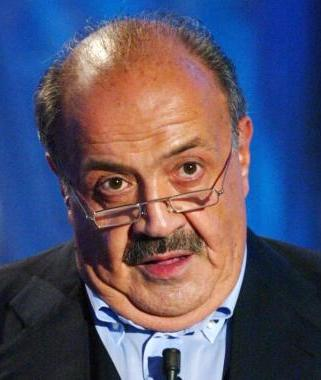
- Costanzo in 2015
- Born: 28 August 1938; Rome, Italy
- Died: 24 February 2023 (aged 84); Rome, Italy
- Occupations: Television host, journalist
- Height: 1.6 m (5 ft 3 in)
- Spouses: Lori Sammartino (m. 1963, divorced) Flaminia Morando (m. 1973; div. 1984) Marta Flavi (m. 1989; div. 1995) Maria De Filippi (m. 1995)
- Partner: Simona Izzo (1983–1986)
- Children: 3, including Saverio

Maurizio Costanzo (28 August 1938 – 24 February 2023) was an Italian television host, journalist, screenwriter, and film director.

== Biography ==
Costanzo began his career as a journalist, first as a contributing writer to Paese Sera and then as managing editor of the weekly Grazia. In the late 1970s, he was the founding editor of the newspaper L'Occhio. Parallel to his career as a journalist, he worked as a radio and TV host, where he became known for his subtle, low-profile irony. His most popular show, Bontà loro was a staple of RAI's programming but he was forced to resign after news broke that he was a member of the Propaganda Due masonic lodge. Costanzo then moved to Silvio Berlusconi's main TV station Canale 5, where he hosted the Maurizio Costanzo Show. It was the first Italian talk show. The program worked as a talent scout and launched many Italian artists and showmen (like Alessandro Bergonzoni, Dario Vergassola, Walter Nudo, Daniele Luttazzi, Ricky Memphis, David Riondino, Stefano Nosei, Nick Novecento, Claudio Bisio, Platinette, and Enzo Iacchetti), contributing to the popularity of as many others (like Valerio Mastandrea, Giobbe Covatta, Enrico Brignano, Giampiero Mughini, and Afef Jnifen).

Costanzo was the artistic director of Canale 5 until 2009. In 2010 he returned to RAI, presenting the talk show Bontà sua. Since 2011 he also collaborated with Radio Manà Manà.

Costanzo was the "communication-agent" (an aesthetical and rhetorical consultant for public appearances) of many Italian political leaders. He was a professor at the Università degli Studi Niccolò Cusano.

Costanzo also wrote screenplays for several films. In 1977 he wrote and directed his first and to this day, last film, Melodrammore. In 1966 he co-wrote the lyrics of the song "Se telefonando", which was popularized by Mina.

On 14 May 1993, Costanzo, who had expressed delight at the arrest of Sicilian Mafia boss Salvatore Riina, was almost killed by a bomb as he drove down a Rome street; 23 people were injured.

== Personal life and death ==
Costanzo was married four times. In 1963 he married Lori Sammartino, a journalist and photographer fourteen years his senior. He later married another journalist, Flaminia Morando, who left her husband Alberto Michelini for Costanzo. Costanzo and Morando had two children: Camilla (born 1973) and Saverio (born 1975); they divorced in the late 1970s. From 1983 to 1986 Costanzo lived with the actress, voice actress, screenwriter and director Simona Izzo. On 7 June 1989, he married the TV presenter Marta Flavi, but they separated in December 1990 and divorced in 1995. On his 57th birthday, 28 August 1995, Costanzo married Maria De Filippi, a television host and producer, who had been living with him since 1990. In 2004, the couple adopted a 12-year-old boy. Maurizio Costanzo has a strong connection to the village of Ansedonia, in the province of Grosseto, where he had a residence for decades and spent his holidays there together with Maria de Filippi.

Costanzo died on 24 February 2023 at the private clinic Paideia of Rome at the age of 84. His funeral was officiated on 27 February 2023 in the Basilica of Santa Maria in Montesanto in Rome, after which he was buried in the Campo Verano cemetery.

== Films ==
=== Screenwriter ===
- 1968 – A qualsiasi prezzo, by Emilio P. Miraglia
- 1969 – I quattro del pater noster, by Ruggero Deodato
- 1969 – Il giovane normale, by Dino Risi
- 1970 – Cerca di capirmi, by Mariano Laurenti
- 1976 – Al piacere di rivederla, by Marco Leto
- 1976 – Bordella, by Pupi Avati
- 1976 – La casa dalle finestre che ridono, by Pupi Avati
- 1977 – L'altra metà del cielo, by Franco Rossi
- 1977 – Una giornata particolare, by Ettore Scola
- 1977 – Tutti defunti... tranne i morti, by Pupi Avati
- 1978 – Melodrammore, by Maurizio Costanzo
- 1978 – Jazz band – Film TV, by Pupi Avati
- 1979 – Cinema!!! – Film TV, by Pupi Avati
- 1983 – Zeder, by Pupi Avati
- 2003 – Per sempre, by Alessandro Di Robilant
- 2005 – Troppo belli, by Ugo Fabrizio Giordani
- 2007 – Voce del verbo amore, by Andrea Manni
