= Giampiero Mughini =

Italian essayist, journalist and television personality (1941-)

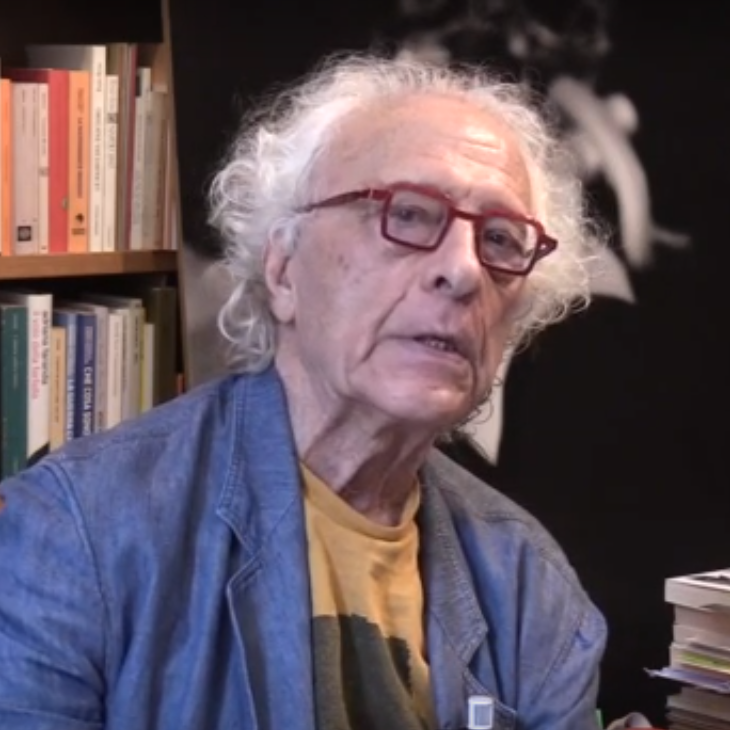
- Mughini at Radio Radicale (2019)
- Born: 16 April 1941 (age 84); Catania, Italy
- Occupation: Writer

Giampiero Mughini (born 16 April 1941) is an Italian essayist, journalist and television personality.

== Life and career ==
Born in Catania, Mughini started his career founding in his hometown the leftist political and cultural magazine Giovane Critica. in 1970 he settled in Rome, where he collaborated with numerous publications, including Paese Sera, Lotta Continua, L'Europeo, Panorama, Il Foglio. The author of numerous essays, his best known work is Compagni addio, a pamphlet in which he justified his detachment from the leftist ideology.

Beyond his literary and journalistic activities, Mughini is well known for his television appearances as a political and sport pundit; a frequent guest in Maurizio Costanzo Show, he was a permanent guest in the Italia 1 football talk shows L’appello del martedì, Controcampo and Tiki Taka. In 2022, he was a contestant in Ballando con le Stelle, the Italian version of Dancing with the Stars.

== Personal life ==
Mughini is married to Michela Pandolfi and has no children; he's an atheist.
