= Balsamus, l'uomo di Satana =

1970 film

- Directed by: Pupi Avati
- Screenplay by: Enzo Leonardo; Giorgio Celli; Pupi Avati
- Story by: Pupi Avati
- Produced by: Marino Carpano
- Starring: Ariano Nanetti; Greta Vayan; Giulio Pizzirani
- Cinematography: Franco Delli Colli
- Edited by: Enzo Micarelli
- Music by: Amedeo Tommasi
- Production company: Magic Films
- Distributed by: I.F.C.
- Release date: 28 January 1970 (Italy)
- Running time: 98 minutes
- Country: Italy
- Box office: ₤34 million

Balsamus, l'uomo di Satana (lit. 'Balsamus the Man of Satan') is a 1970 Italian film. It is the debut film of director Pupi Avati.

== Cast ==
- Bob Tonelli as Balsamus
- Greta Vaillant as Lorenza
- Giulio Pizzirani as Ottavio
- Gianni Cavina as Alliata
- Antonio Avati as Dorillo

== Style ==
Despite the title and promotional material for the film, film historian Roberto Curti discussed the films genre, declaring it to not be a horror film, but a film that "embodies elements of comedy, with an insistence on regional types, but its main feature is grotesque."

== Production ==
Balsamus, l'umo di Satana was a production with a crew of people director Pupi Avati knew personally. The film was written by Avati and his friends Enzo Leonardo and Giorgio Celli. Avati's brother, Antonio Avati acts in the film as Dorillo. Avati later described the script as one "with in-depth linguistic, lexical and historical research. We put everything we could in it and more, in the illusion of being appreciated by who knows who or where. Which did not happen."

The films lead of Ariano Nanetti (credited as Bob Tonelli) was a local entrepreneur who Avati had me through his assistant Alberto Bartolani. Nanetti was not a professional actor, but a young entrepreneur who stated he could raise one billion Italian lire for the film. Nanetti was hired by Avati, who showed up to the set with a person he introduced as "Mister X" who signed checks for 160 million lire. "Mister X"'s identity was of businessman Carmine Domenico Rizzo.

Balsamus, l'umo di Satana was filmed on location near Bologna and at Incir-De Paolis in Rome.

== Release ==
Balsamus, l'uomo di Satana was only submitted to the board of censors in Italy in January 1970, nearly two years afters it finished production. It was released in Italy on 28 January 1970 where it was distributed by I.F.C. The film grossed a total of 34 million Italian lire domestically.
