= Giorgio Celli =

Italian politician

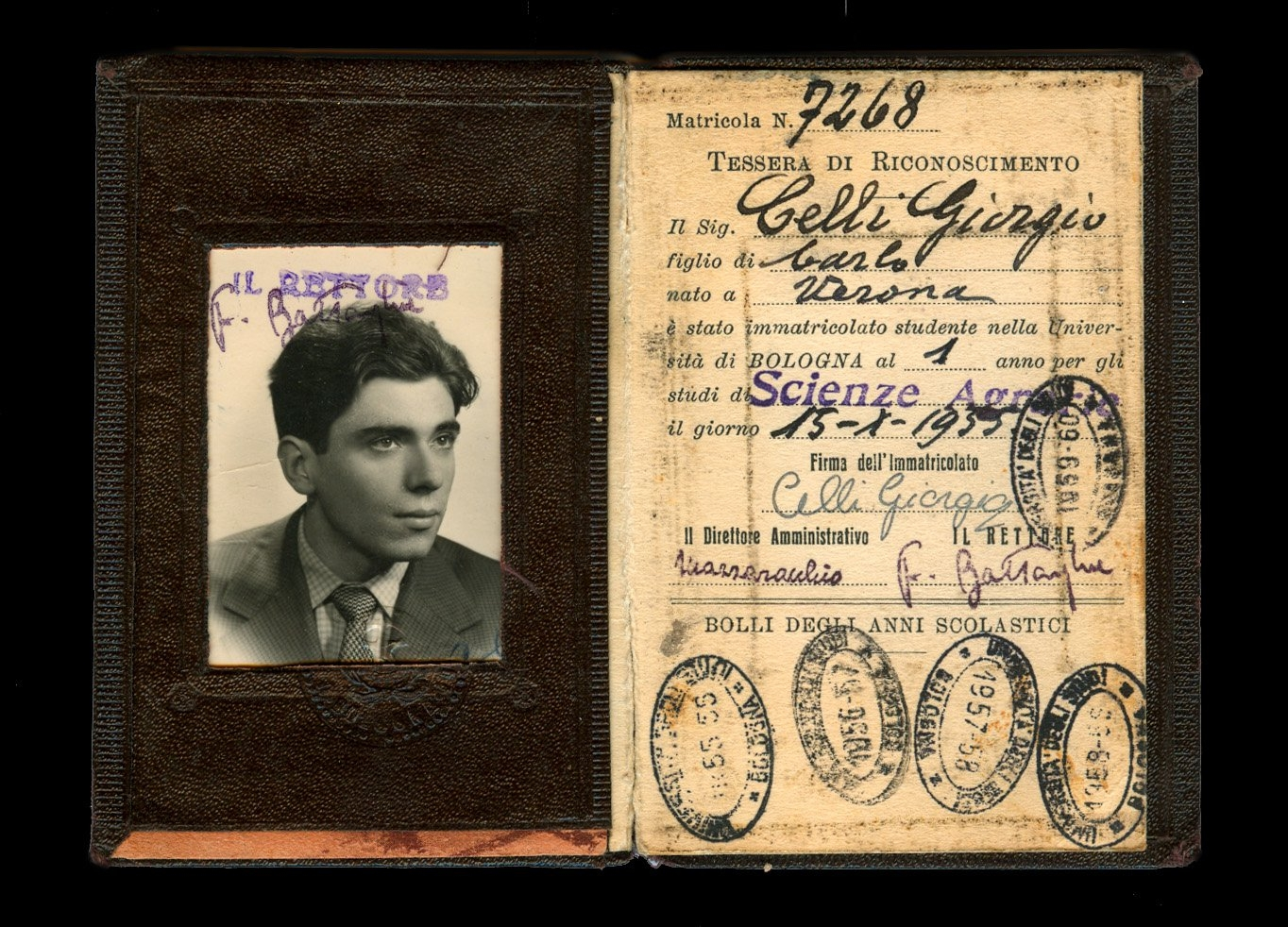

Giorgio Celli (16 July 1935 – 11 June 2011) was an Italian entomologist, ecologist, professor, writer, and politician.

== Early life ==
Celli was born in Verona. After receiving his degree in agronomical sciences in 1959, Celli taught at the University of Bologna. His research focused on pesticides in the context of bees and agroecosystems.

== Writing and acting ==
Celli wrote novels, plays, essays, and poetry. In 1975 he won the Pirandello Prize for his play Le tentazioni del professor Faust. His works were performed at Festival dei Due Mondi in Spoleto.

As an actor, Celli appeared in films such as Pupi Avati's La mazurka del barone, della santa e del fico fiorone. On television, he hosted the documentary programme Nel regno degli animali.

His poetry titled «Versicoli quasi ecologici» (Quasi-ecological verses) was the subject of text analysis for the first test of the 2017 final exams in Italy.

== Politics ==
Celli was a Member of the European Parliament from 1999 to 2004, representing The Greens–European Free Alliance. At the same time he was a councillor for the city of Bologna, with the Federation of the Greens party.

== Death ==
On 10 May 2011 he was admitted for surgery at Policlinico Sant'Orsola-Malpighi in Bologna. He died in Bologna on 11 June 2011.
