= Franco Delli Colli =

Italian cinematographer

- Born: 2 March 1929; Rome, Italy
- Died: 22 April 2004 (aged 75); Rome, Italy
- Relatives: Tonino Delli Colli (cousin)

Franco Delli Colli (2 March 1929 – 22 April 2004) was an Italian cinematographer.

Born in Rome, he began to work in the late 1940s with his cousin Tonino Delli Colli as camera operator and assistant cinematographer, and worked with him to dozens of films, including Dino Risi's Poor, But Handsome, Pier Paolo Pasolini's Accattone and Mamma Roma and Luchino Visconti's The Leopard. In the early 1960s, Delli Colli started his career as cinematographer, working mainly in genre films; his credits include Pupi Avati's Balsamus and Zeder, Giulio Questi's Django Kill, Lamberto Bava's Macabre and Sidney Salkow's The Last Man on Earth. In early nineties he retired from cinema to dedicate himself to design a right lighting to improve the appearance of the most famous and frequented places in Italian art cities.
