= Lino Capolicchio =

Italian actor, screenwriter, and film director (1943–2022)

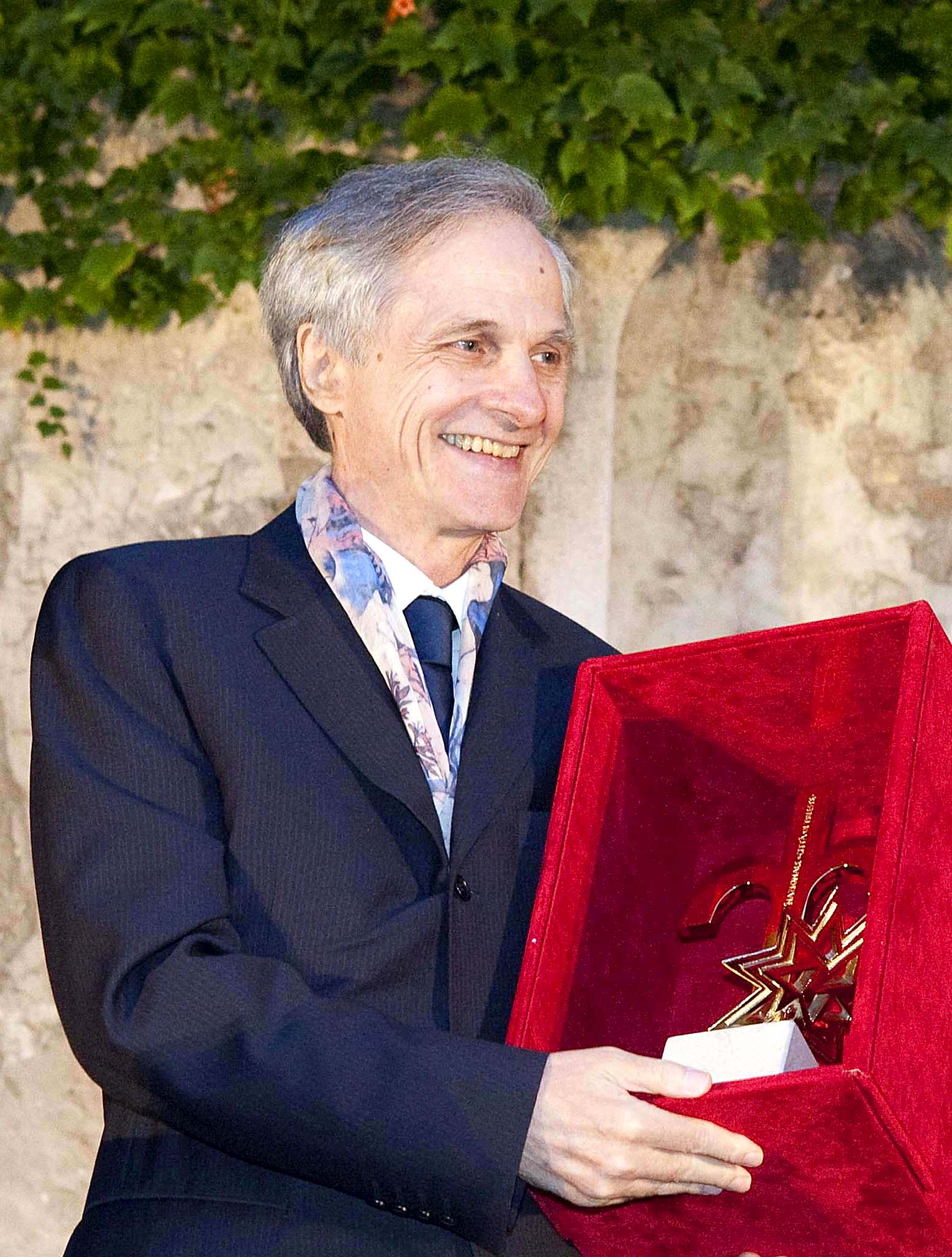
- Lino Capolicchio in 2009
- Born: 21 August 1943; Merano, Italy
- Died: 3 May 2022 (aged 78); Rome, Italy
- Occupations: Actor, screenwriter, director
- Known for: The Garden of the Finzi-Continis; The House with Laughing Windows

Lino Capolicchio (21 August 1943 – 3 May 2022) was an Italian actor, screenwriter, and director. He won a special David di Donatello acting award for his role in Vittorio de Sica's 1970 film, The Garden of the Finzi-Contini.

Capolicchio was a well-known television actor before breaking into film with an uncredited role in Franco Zeffirelli's The Taming of the Shrew in 1967. He appeared in over seventy films and television dramas. In 1995 he wrote and directed Pugili, an award-winning film about the world of boxing.

For three seasons, Capolicchio provided the voice for Bo Duke in the Italian broadcasts of The Dukes of Hazzard.

== Partial filmography ==
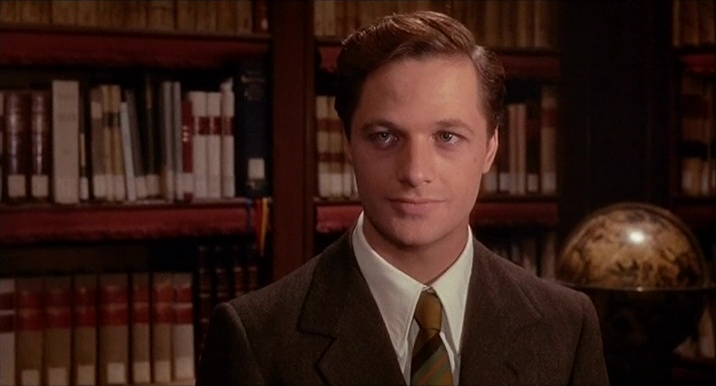
Capolicchio in The Garden of the Finzi-Continis (1970)

- 1967: The Taming of the Shrew - Gregory (uncredited)
- 1968: Escalation - Luca Lambertinghi
- 1969: Metti una sera a cena - Rick / Nina's lover
- 1969: Il giovane normale - Giordano
- 1969: Vergogna schifosi - Carletto
- 1970: The Garden of the Finzi-Continis - Giorgio
- 1970: Le tue mani sul mio corpo - Andrea
- 1971: Mio padre Monsignore - Carlo Alberto Maggiolino
- 1971: Un apprezzato professionista di sicuro avvenire - Vincenzo Arduni
- 1972: For Love One Dies - Renato
- 1972: Body of Love - The Young Stranger
- 1973: Amore e ginnastica - Simone Censani
- 1974: Last Days of Mussolini - Pierluigi Bellini delle Stelle 'Pedro'
- 1974: Di mamma non ce n'è una sola - Marcello
- 1975: The Last Day of School Before Christmas - Erasmo
- 1976: Càlamo - Riccardo
- 1976: Cross Shot - Antonio Blasi
- 1976: The House with Laughing Windows - Stefano
- 1978: The Bloodstained Shadow - Stefano D'Archangelo
- 1979: Le strelle nel fosso - Silvano
- 1980: Lion of the Desert - Captain Bedendo
- 1980: Il mondo degli ultimi
- 1982: Canto d'amore - Giulio
- 1984: The Three of Us - Leopoldo Mozart
- 1988: The Last Minute - Renzo De Carlo
- 1992: Fratelli e sorelle - Aldo
- 1992: Il giardino dei ciliegi - Pietro
- 1993: Fiorile - Luigi
- 1995: Pugili (writer & director)
- 1996: Traveling Companion - Pepe
- 1997: Porzus - Galvano
- 1999: Il tempo dell'amore - Doctor
- 2001: L'accertamento - Giacomo Toschi
- 2001: An Impossible Crime - Valerio Garau
- 2002: Il diario di Matilde Manzoni (writer & director)
- 2004: L'eretico - Un gesto di coraggio - Cino da Pistoia
- 2009: Aller-retour - Giuseppe Amato
- 2010: A Second Childhood - Emilio
- 2014: L'altro Adamo
- 2014: Fuori Mira - Carlo Buzzi
- 2018: Respiri - Michele
