= Zeder =

- Italian theatrical release poster
- Directed by: Pupi Avati
- Screenplay by: Pupi Avati; Maurizio Costanzo; Antonio Avati
- Story by: Pupi Avati
- Produced by: Gianni Minervini; Antonio Avati
- Starring: Gabriele Lavia; Anne Canovas
- Cinematography: Franco Delli Colli
- Edited by: Amedeo Salfa
- Music by: Riz Ortolani
- Production company: A.M.A. Film
- Distributed by: Gaumont
- Release date: 10 August 1983 (Italy)
- Running time: 100 minutes
- Country: Italy
- Box office: ₤334 million

Zeder is a 1983 Italian horror film directed by Pupi Avati, starring Gabriele Lavia. The story is about a young novelist's discovery of the writings of a late scientist who had found a means of reviving the dead.

== Plot ==
In 1956, Gabriella (Veronica Moriconi)—a girl with apparent psychic powers—is brought to the enormous house of Dr. Meyer (Cesare Barbetti) in Chartres, France. Meyer intends to conduct an experiment testing her abilities. He takes her into his basement, where the youngster abruptly falls to her knees and begins digging into the dirt. "This is where you're hiding, isn't it?" Meyer yells. He rushes upstairs for help from his assistants and leaves Gabriella by herself. She is attacked by something unseen and is taken to the hospital. In the basement, further digging reveals a rotted corpse, with a nearby wallet identifying the dead man as Paolo Zeder. Dr. Meyer realizes that the earth in which Zeder was buried was a 'K-Zone'.

In present-day Bologna, Stefano (Gabriele Lavia), a novelist, is given an old typewriter as a birthday present by his wife Alessandra (Anne Canovas). One night, after Alessandra has gone to bed, he discovers a series of typed letters on the typewriter's ribbon. As he reads the ribbon, he finds it is an essay written by scientist Paolo Zeder discussing the existence of K-Zones—areas where death ceases to exist. According to Zeder's essay, bodies buried in these zones can return from the dead.

Stefano investigates the message left on the typewriter ribbon. He encounters people who make it clear that they do not appreciate any questions relating to Paolo Zeder or K-Zones. However, the resistance he experiences intrigues him even more. He becomes obsessed with getting answers to the mystery and temporarily abandons his wife. His investigation leads him to a huge old property, ostensibly abandoned but protected by electrified fences. A nearby service station attendant tells Stefano that French investors are building a gigantic hotel on the property, but no work is ever seen being done.

Stefano sneaks onto the property and discovers surveillance equipment with numerous monitors showing the dead face of a man buried in a coffin. Stefano watches the monitors. The dead man is Don Luigi Costa, an ex-priest who abandoned his vows after contracting an incurable disease. Continuing Zeder's work, Costa had himself buried on the property, a suspected K-Zone, and his rebirth from the dead is caught on camera. Stefano manages to elude the conspirators involved in the experimental work, but finds his wife has been murdered by them. At night, Stefano buries her in a K-Zone located on the abandoned property. She revives and approaches her husband. In the darkness, Stefano begins screaming horribly.

== Cast ==
- Gabriele Lavia as Stefano
- Anne Canovas as Alessandra
- Paola Tanziani as Gabriella Goodman
- Cesare Barbetti as Dr. Meyer
- Bob Tonelli as Uomo di Chartres
- Ferdinando Orlandi as Giovine
- Enea Ferrario as Mirko
- John Stacy as Professor Chesi
- Alessandro Partexano as Police Lt. Silvestre
- Marcello Tusco as Doctor Melis
- Carlo Schincaglia as Don Luigi Costa
- Veronica Moriconi as Young Gabriella
- Enrico Ardizzone as Benni
- Maria Teresa Tofano as Anna
- Andrea Montuschi as Inspector Bouffet
- Aldo Sassi as Don Mario
- Adolfo Belletti as Don Emidio
- Paolo Bacchi as Mr. Big's Secretary
- Imelde Marani as Nurse

== Release ==
Although it was initially set for a February 1983 release, Zeder was distributed theatrically in Italy by Gaumont on 10 August 1983. The film grossed a total of 334 million Italian lira in Italy.

Zeder was distributed in the United States under the title Revenge of the Dead by Motion Picture Marketing on 8 May 1984. This version was heavily edited. It was released on DVD in the United States by Image Entertainment. In 2016 the film was released on Blu-ray under the original title Zeder and in an uncut form through the independent label Code Red DVD.

== Reception ==
Writing in The Zombie Movie Encyclopedia, academic Peter Dendle said, "Though the acting, direction, and production values of Avati's stylish Italian mystery are solid, the tight build-up of the first half only deteriorates into irresolution and incoherence." Glenn Kay, who wrote Zombie Movies: The Ultimate Guide, said that the film "stands out a little by actually trying to generate suspense and not completely repulsing its audience".
