= Gianni Minervini (producer) =

Italian actor (1928–2020)

Gianni Minervini (26 October 1928 – 4 February 2020) was an Italian television and film producer.

Born in Naples, Minervini was the son of the journalist Roberto Minervini. In 1976, he co-founded with the brothers Antonio and Pupi Avati the production company A.M.A. Film. The Avati brothers left the company in late 1983, leaving the sole Minervini leading the company alone.

Minervini won three David di Donatello Awards for best producer, in 1982, 1984 and 1990. He also won a Nastro d'Argento in 1984 for the production of Where's Picone?.

== Selected filmography ==
- 1960 – Toto, Fabrizi and the Young People Today
- 1969 – Night of the Serpent
- 1971 – Summer Affair
- 1976 – The House with Laughing Windows
- 1977 – Berlinguer, I Love You
- 1979 – Mimi
- 1980 – Macabre
- 1981 – Help Me Dream
- 1983 – A School Outing
- 1983 – Zeder
- 1984 – Where's Picone?
- 1985 – Secrets Secrets
- 1986 – Summer Night
- 1986 – The Bride Was Beautiful
- 1987 – The Strangeness of Life
- 1988 – What if Gargiulo Finds Out?
- 1989 – Marrakech Express
- 1990 – On Tour
- 1991 – Mediterraneo
- 1992 – Gangsters
- 1996 – Sacred Silence
- 1998 – The Dust of Naples
- 2010 – Dark Love
