= The House with Laughing Windows =

The House With Laughing Windows
- Italian film poster
- Directed by: Pupi Avati
- Screenplay by: Pupi Avati; Antonio Avati; Gianni Cavina; Maurizio Costanzo
- Story by: Pupi Avati; Antonio Avati; Gianni Cavina; Maurizio Costanzo
- Produced by: Antonio Avati; Gianni Minervini
- Starring: Lino Capolicchio; Francesca Marciano; Gianni Cavina
- Cinematography: Pasquale Rachini
- Edited by: Giusuppe Baghdighian
- Music by: Amedeo Tommassi
- Production company: A.M.A. Film
- Distributed by: Euro International Films
- Release date: 16 August 1976 (Italy)
- Running time: 110 minutes
- Country: Italy
- Box office: ₤722,135,201 (Note: Equivalent to €4,077,968 in 2023)

The House with Laughing Windows (Italian: La casa dalle finestre che ridono) is a 1976 Italian giallo thriller horror film co-written and directed by Pupi Avati. The film was shot in Lido degli Scacchi in the Ferrara province of the Emilia-Romagna region in northern Italy.

== Plot ==
Stefano (Lino Capolicchio) arrives in a village of the Valli di Comacchio area where he has been employed to restore a fresco depicting what appears to be the martyrdom of Saint Sebastian, which has been painted on a rotting wall of the local church by a mysterious, long-dead artist named Legnani. While temporarily taking up residence in the house that had been previously owned by the two sisters of the deceased painter, Stefano begins a romance with a new, beautiful schoolteacher, Francesca (Francesca Marciano), meanwhile learning from various townspeople that the painter had been a madman who had derived his art from real life. Specifically, Stefano learns that the artist – assisted by his two equally-insane sisters – had been a killer who brutally tortured people to death as inspiration for his horrific paintings – a practice that had likely been used for the very painting he is in process of restoring. As Stefano is discouraged for his task throughout the town, some of the villagers are brutally killed – including his employer – and he comes to suspect that their murderer is trying to deter him from discovering the full truth behind the artist and his ominous legacy within the sleepy community.

== Cast ==
- Lino Capolicchio as Stefano
- Francesca Marciano as Francesca
- Gianni Cavina as Coppola
- Giulio Pizzirani as Antonio Mazza
- Vanna Busoni as Teacher
- Andrea Matteuzzi as Poppi
- Bob Tonelli as Solmi
- Pietro Brambilla as Lidio
- Ferdinando Orlandi as Marshall
- Ines Ciaschetti as Concierge
- Flavia Giorgi as Poppi's Wife
- Eugene Walter as Priest
- Carla Astolfi as Chambermaid
- Tonino Corazzari as Buono Legnani
- Pina Borione as Laura Legnani
- John Marquette as Saint Sebastian In Fresco (uncredited)

== Production ==
The idea for The House With Laughing Windows came from a story director Pupi Avati had heard as a child involving the exhumation of a priest in the village of Sasso Marconi. An early draft of the script was developed in the early 1970s under the title La luce dell'ultimo piano which was written by both Avati and Antonion Troisio. It was produced by Antonio Cuomo who later backed out of the project. Avati began working on the script again after the financial failure of his film House of Pleasure for Women and made several changes to the character and story. The final story and screenplay was credited to Pupi Avati and Antonio Avati.

The House with Laughing Windows was the first film produced by director Pupi Avati's company A.M.A. Film. The film was shot over five weeks between April and May 1976 in Comacchio and Minerbio, Ferrara, Italy. Although the credits state Incir-De Paolis Studios in Rome, this was purely listed for bureaucratic reasons.

== Release ==
The House with Laughing Windows was distributed theatrically in Italy by Euro International Films where on 16 August 1976. On its domestic release, the film grossed a total of 722,135,201 Italian lire.

== Reception ==
Mikel J. Koven, writing in La Dolce Morte, argues that through the presence of the outsider Stefano, an art historian visiting the village who uncovers the long unsolved crime, the film explores a theme common to many gialli: the shattering of the idyllic isolation of Italian village life by the forces of modernity.

The film has been received well by contemporary critics. AllMovie's review of the film was favorable, giving it a rating of 3 out of 5, and writing that "[though] fans of typical Italian horror films may find House with the Windows That Laugh [sic] lacking in the stylistic excesses of many of its contemporary companion pieces, it exceeds its contemporaries in almost every other area," and that it was "imbued with an overwhelming sense of dread that grows to an almost unbearable pitch."

On review aggregate Rotten Tomatoes, no score has yet been reached with only two critical ratings submitted. The current ratings – both "fresh" — are from Emanuel Levy of emanuellevy.com, who gave the film a 3 out of 5, and Anton Bitel of Eye for Film, who gave the film a 4.5 out of 5, and wrote, "certainly a gripping giallo, but also an intelligent allegory of post-war Italy's struggles to emerge from the Fascist outrages of its recent past."

== Availability and legacy ==
On 9 August 2011 Trailers From Hell! uploaded a video segment on the film to YouTube, in which Eli Roth discusses his feelings on its merits and the giallo genre, opining that it is "a great place to start [into giallo]" and "amongst the best" of the genre, ultimately comparing the film to the work of Dario Argento, Mario Bava, and Lucio Fulci — "the masters of the giallo."

The House with Laughing Windows was released on Region 1 DVD on 18 March 2003 through Paradox Entertainment. On 5 January 2010 the film was released on Region 2 DVD through Metrodome.

It was screened as an outstanding example of its genre at the British Film Institute in November 2019.

In December 2025 it was released as on both Ultra HD Blu-ray and Blu-ray Disc, in a new 4K resolution/High dynamic range master scanned from the original camera negative and supervised by director Pupi Avati in the UK.

== See also ==
- List of Italian films of 1976

== Sources ==
- Curti, Roberto (2017). Italian Gothic Horror Films, 1970–1979. McFarland. ISBN 978-1476629605.
