= Giovanni Agnelli =

Giovanni Agnelli may refer to:

- Giovanni Agnelli (entrepreneur, born 1866) (1866–1945), Italian industrialist and principal founder of Fiat S.p.A.
- Gianni Agnelli (1921–2003), Italian industrialist, grandson of the above
