= La mazurka del barone, della santa e del fico fiorone =

- Directed by: Pupi Avati
- Screenplay by: Pupi Avati; Antonio Avati; Gianni Cavina
- Story by: Pupi Avati; Antonio Avati
- Produced by: Giovanni Bertolucci
- Starring: Ugo Tognazzi; Paolo Villaggio; Delia Boccardo; Gianni Cavina; Giulio Pizzirani; Gianfranco Barra; Lucienne Camille; Lucio Dalla; Patrizia De Clara
- Cinematography: Luigi Kuveiller
- Edited by: Ruggero Mastroianni
- Music by: Amedeo Tommasi
- Production company: Euro International Film
- Distributed by: Euro International Film
- Release date: 25 January 1975 (Italy)
- Running time: 111 minutes
- Country: Italy
- Language: Italian
- Budget: L392 million
- Box office: c. L1.5 billion

La mazurka del barone, della santa e del fico fiorone (lit. 'The Mazurka of the Baron, the Saint and the Early Fig Tree') is a 1975 Italian black comedy film co-written and directed by Pupi Avati. It is considered one of the most atypical commedia all'italiana films.

The film marked Avati's return to filmmaking after a six-year absence, during which he worked as director of TV commercials.

== Plot ==
Baron Anteo Pellacani returns to the family estate to assume the rights of the heir. In the garden adjacent to the old mansion, there is a fig tree, which, according to legend, has miraculous properties. Moreover, some even managed to see the Holy Virgin after they touched the tree. But the baron has his own memories: he fell from this magical tree at a young age and injured his leg so badly that he remained lame for life. And now he has to face the hated tree again...

== Cast ==
- Ugo Tognazzi as Baron Anteo Pellacani
- Paolo Villaggio as Checco 'Biancone' Coniglio
- Delia Boccardo as Prostitute / St. Girolama
- Gianni Cavina as Petazzoni
- Giulio Pizzirani as Father Arioso
- Gianfranco Barra as Brigadier Caputo
- Lucienne Camille as Silvana
- Andrea Matteuzzi as Marquis
- Bob Tonelli as Notary
- Pina Borione as Anteo's Aunt
- Ines Ciaschetti as Anteo's Aunt
- Ferdinando Orlandi as Festival Presenter
- Adolfo Caruso as Mayor
- Lucio Dalla as Fava
- Patrizia De Clara as Eugenia Pellacani Bompani

== See also ==
- List of Italian films of 1975
