= House of Pleasure for Women =

- Directed by: Pupi Avati
- Screenplay by: Antonio Avati; Maurizio Costanzo; Gianni Cavina; Pupi Avati
- Story by: Antonio Avati; Maurizio Costanzo; Gianni Cavina; Pupi Avati
- Starring: Al Lettieri; Gigi Proietti; Christian De Sica; Gianni Cavina; Taryn Power; Vladek Sheybal; Luigi Montefiori; Vincent Gardenia
- Cinematography: Erico Menczer
- Edited by: Amedeo Salfa
- Music by: Amedeo Tommasi
- Production company: Euro International Films
- Distributed by: Euro International Films
- Release date: 1976

House of Pleasure for Women (Italian: Bordella) is a 1976 satirical comedy film written and directed by Pupi Avati and starring Gigi Proietti, Christian De Sica, Gianni Cavina, Al Lettieri and Vincent Gardenia.

== Plot ==
A brothel for women is opened in Milan, Italy.

== Cast ==
- Gigi Proietti as Ivano Zuccoli
- Christian De Sica as Count Ugolino Facchini
- Al Lettieri as Eddie Mordace
- Gianni Cavina as Adone Tonti
- Vincent Gardenia as Mr. Chips
- Taryn Power as Olimpia
- George Eastman as Luciano aka "Sinbad"
- Vladek Sheybal as Francesco
- Maurizio Bonuglia as Gualtiero
- Rosemarie Lindt as Gualtiero's Wife
- Elisa Mainardi as Luciana Muccioli
- Greta Vaillant
- Troy Beasley as Silkio Luciano

== Production ==
House of Pleasure for Women was shot in 1975.

== Release ==
House of Pleasure for Women was released in early 1976.

== See also ==
- List of Italian films of 1976

== Footnotes ==
=== References ===
- Curti, Roberto (2017). Italian Gothic Horror Films, 1970-1979. McFarland. ISBN 978-1476629605.
