= Gianni Cavina =

Italian actor (1940–2022)

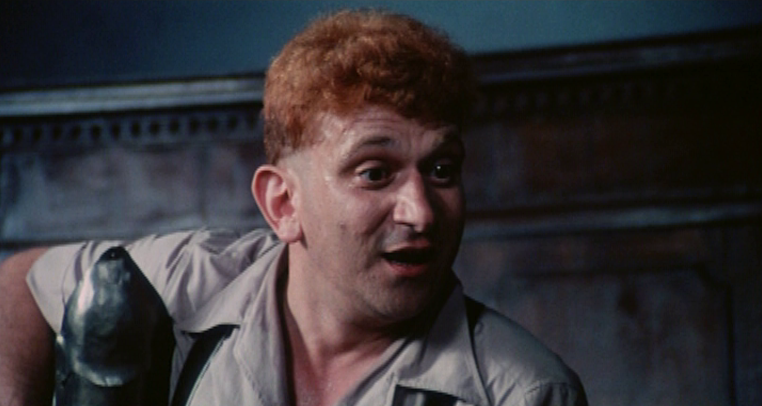
- Cavina in La mazurka del barone, della santa e del fico fiorone (1975)
- Born: 9 December 1940; Bologna, Italy
- Died: 26 March 2022 (aged 81); Bologna, Italy
- Occupation: Actor
- Years active: 1968–2022

Gianni Cavina (9 December 1940 – 26 March 2022) was an Italian film actor. He appeared in more than 40 films from 1968 to 2022. Born in Bologna, Cavina trained as a stage actor at the Teatro Stabile di Bologna, under the direction of Franco Parenti. He made his film debut in the 1968 horror Balsamus, l'uomo di Satana, directed by Pupi Avati, with whom he had a long collaboration, starring in many of his films.

Cavina died in his hometown Bologna on 26 March 2022, at the age of 81.

== Selected filmography ==
- Balsamus, l'uomo di Satana (1968)
- Flashback (1969)
- The Kiss (1974)
- Il figlio della sepolta viva (1974)
- La mazurka del barone, della santa e del fico fiorone (1975)
- The House with Laughing Windows (1976)
- House of Pleasure for Women (1976)
- The Big Operator (1976)
- Traffic Jam (1979)
- La locandiera (1980)
- Il turno (1981)
- Cornetti alla crema (1981)
- The Three of Us (1984)
- Christmas Present (1986)
- Midsummer Night's Dance (1999)
- Empty Eyes (2001)
- Christmas Rematch (2004)
- The Wedding Director (2006)
- The Big Heart of the Girls (2011)
- Welcome Mr. President (2013)
- Il signor Diavolo (2019)
- Dante (2022)
