= Pupi Avati =

Italian film director, producer, and screenwriter

Commander OMRI Pupi Avati
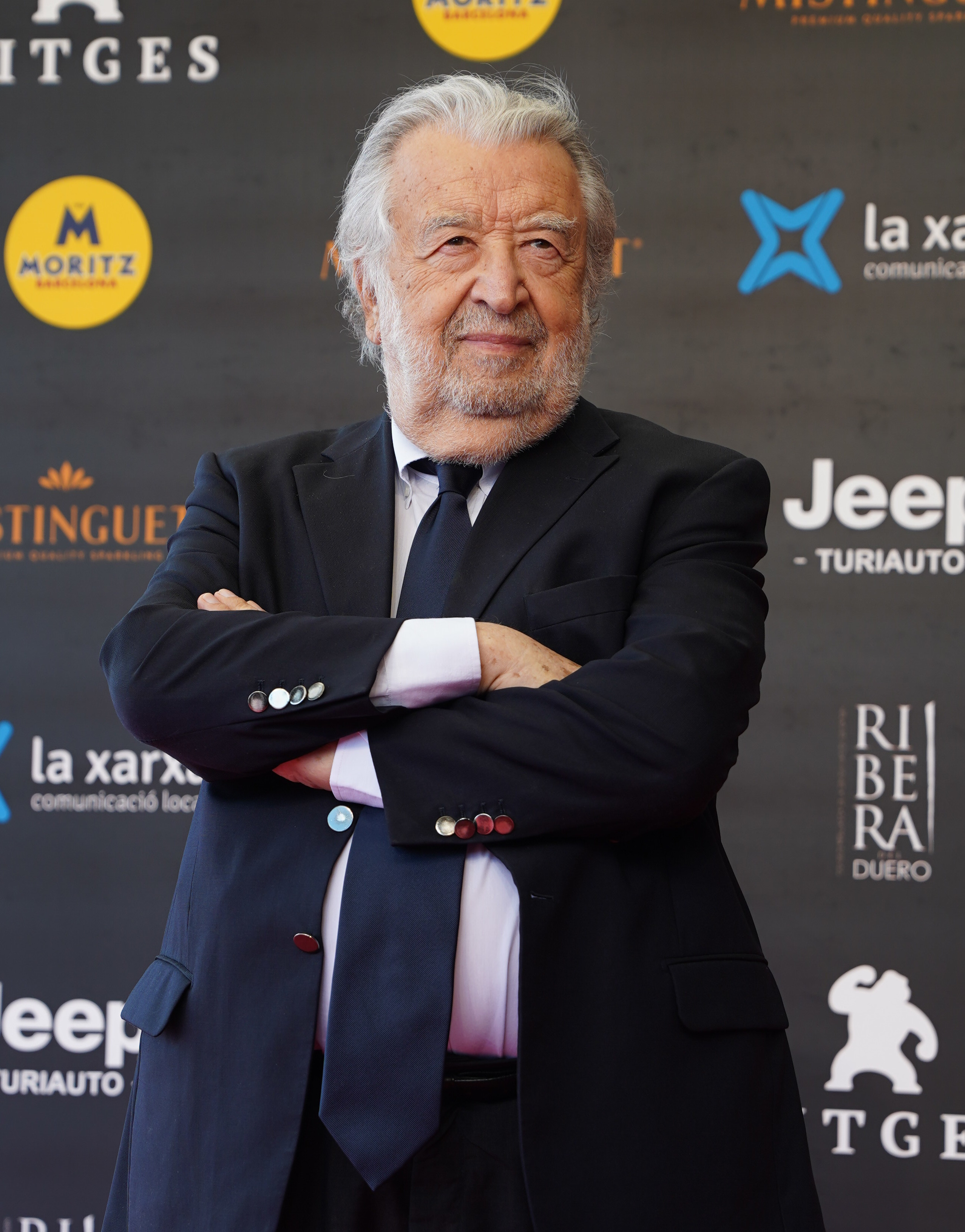
- Pupi Avati in 2019
- Born: Giuseppe Avati; 3 November 1938 (age 87); Bologna, Kingdom of Italy
- Education: University of Florence
- Occupations: Film director; film producer; screenwriter
- Known for: The House with Laughing Windows; Zeder
- Height: 1.68 m (5 ft 6 in)
- Spouse: Amelia Turri (m. 1964)
- Children: Three

Giuseppe "Pupi" Avati (born 3 November 1938) is an Italian film director, producer, and screenwriter. He is known to horror film fans for his giallo movie The House with Laughing Windows (1976) and Zeder (1983).

== Early life and career ==
Pupi Avati was born in Bologna in 1938. After attending school and studying political science at the University of Florence, he started working at a frozen food company. At the same time, he developed a passion for jazz, becoming a proficient clarinetist. In the second half of the 1950s, he formed and played in the Doctor Dixie Jazz Band, of which Lucio Dalla was also a member.

Although he initially intended to be a professional musician, Avati felt he lacked the necessary talent. In the mid-1960s, he decided to dedicate himself to cinema after seeing Federico Fellini's 8½ and its portrait of the role of a director. Avati's passion for music, as well as his love for his hometown, which was the setting of many of his films, were to become recurrent themes found in his productions.

His first films were Balsamus. L'uomo di Satana (1968) and Thomas e gli indemoniati (1969).

His filmography as a director includes almost forty films and television works. As a screenwriter, Avati wrote or co-authored the majority of his movies, as well as screenplays for other directors. He cooperated on the script of Salò o le 120 giornate di Sodoma (Salò, or the 120 Days of Sodom, 1976) directed by Pier Paolo Pasolini, even though he is not credited for it. He also produced several films for other directors and his own work. Many of his movies are also produced by his brother Antonio Avati.

Avati began his career directing horror films and is considered one of the most notable Italian directors of this genre, with titles including La casa dalle finestre che ridono (The House with Laughing Windows, 1976) and Zeder (1983), which are considered his masterpieces.

According to Avati, the TV series Jazz Band (1978), written about the story of the Doctor Dixie Jazz Band, marked a turning point for his work. The subject of his movies began coming from his own experience, and his cinema became more nostalgic, introspective, and autobiographical. Moreover, the series was successful and brought Avati to the attention of a wider public compared to his previous films.

Throughout his career, Avati successfully directed and produced many genres of film, including horrors, medieval period pieces, dramas, jazz comedies, buddy comedies, biopics and others, proving himself to be a versatile director.

During his career as a director, screenwriter, and producer, Avati was nominated for the Golden Palm, Silver Ribbons, David di Donatello Awards, and many others. He won two David di Donatello Awards and five Silver Ribbons.

Avati was nominated Commendatore Ordine al Merito della Repubblica Italiana on 2 June 1995.

He has presided over the Federico Fellini Foundation, created in 1995, in memory of the great Rimini-born director.

In 2008, Avati published his autobiography, Sotto le stelle di un film. Inspired by the autobiography of the director, in 2010, Claudio Costa made a documentary film of interviews and animations, called Pupi Avati, ieri oggi domani ("Pupi Avati, yesterday today tomorrow").

He is also the author of the novels Il ragazzo in soffitta (2015), Il signor diavolo (2018), from which he made a film of the same name the following year, and L'archivio del diavolo (2020).

=== Personal life ===
Pupi Avati is married to Amelia "Nicola" Turri and has two sons and a daughter. He is Catholic.

== Filmography ==
=== Films directed ===
- Balsamus, l'uomo di Satana (Blood Relations, 1968)
- Thomas e gli indemoniati (Thomas and the Bewitched, 1969)
- La mazurka del barone, della santa e del fico fiorone (The Mazurka of the Baron, the Saint and the Early Fig Tree, 1975)
- Bordella (House of Pleasure for Women, 1976)
- La casa dalle finestre che ridono (The House with Laughing Windows, 1976)
- Tutti defunti... tranne i morti (All Deceased... Except the Dead, 1977)
- Le strelle nel fosso (1979)
- Aiutami a sognare (Help Me Dream, 1981)
- Zeder (1983) released on video as Revenge of the Dead
- Una gita scolastica (A School Outing, 1983)
- Noi tre (We Three, 1984)
- Impiegati (1984)
- Festa di laurea (Graduation Party, 1985)
- Regalo di Natale (Christmas Present, 1986)
- Ultimo minuto (The Last Minute, 1987)
- Sposi (Bride and Groom, 1987, first segment)
- Storia di ragazzi e di ragazze (The Story of Boys and Girls, 1989)
- Bix (1991)
- Fratelli e sorelle (Brothers and Sisters, 1991)
- Magnificat (1993)
- L'amico d'infanzia (The Childhood Friend, 1994)
- Dichiarazioni d'amore (Declarations of Love, 1994)
- L'arcano incantatore (The Mysterious Enchanter, 1996)
- Il testimone dello sposo (The Best Man, 1998)
- La via degli angeli (A Midsummer Night's Dance, 1999)
- I cavalieri che fecero l'impresa (The Knights of the Quest, 2001)
- Il cuore altrove (The Heart Is Elsewhere, also known as The Heart Is Everywhere, 2003)
- La rivincita di Natale (Christmas Rematch, 2004)
- Ma quando arrivano le ragazze? (2005)
- La seconda notte di nozze (2005)
- La cena per farli conoscere (2007)
- Il nascondiglio (The Hideout, 2007)
- Il papà di Giovanna (Giovanna's Father, 2008)
- Gli amici del bar Margherita (The Friends at Margherita Café, 2009)
- Il figlio più piccolo ("The youngest son", 2010)
- Una sconfinata giovinezza ("A boundless youth", 2011)
- The Big Heart of Girls (2011)
- Il bambino cattivo (2013)
- A Golden Boy (2014)
- Il Signor Diavolo (2019)
- We Still Talk (2021)
- Dante (2022)
- La quattordicesima domenica del tempo ordinario (2023)
- The American Backyard (2024)
- Nel tepore del ballo (2026)

=== TV productions ===
- Jazz Band (1978)
- Cinema!!! (1979)
- Dancing Paradise (1982)
- Accadde a Bologna (1983)
- È proibito ballare (1989)

=== Written screenplays ===
- Thomas e gli indemoniati (Thomas and the Bewitched, 1970)
- The Kiss (1974) (1974, directed by Mario Lanfranchi)
- La mazurka del barone, della santa e del fico fiorone (1975)
- Cav. Costante Nicosia demoniaco, ovvero: Dracula della Brianza (Dracula in the Provinces, 1975, directed by Lucio Fulci)
- Bordella (House of Pleasure for Women, 1976)
- La casa dalle finestre che ridono (The House with Laughing Windows, 1976)
- Salò o le 120 giornate di Sodoma (Salò, or the 120 Days of Sodom, 1976, uncredited, directed by Pier Paolo Pasolini)
- The Mistress Is Served (1976, directed by Mario Lanfranchi)
- Tutti defunti... tranne i morti (1977)
- Le strelle nel fosso (1979)
- Macabro (Frozen Terror, also known as Macabre, 1980, directed by Lamberto Bava)
- Aiutami a sognare (Help Me Dream, 1981)
- Dancing Paradise (1982)
- Zeder (1983)
- Una gita scolastica (A School Outing, 1983)
- Noi tre (We Three, 1984)
- Impiegati (1984)
- Festa di laurea (Graduation Party, 1985)
- Regalo di Natale (Christmas Present, 1986)
- Ultimo minuto (The Last Minute, 1987)
- Storia di ragazzi e di ragazze (The Story of Boys and Girls, 1989)
- Bix (1991)
- Fratelli e sorelle (Brothers and Sisters, 1991)
- Where the Night Begins (1991, directed by Maurizio Zaccaro)
- Magnificat (1993)
- Dichiarazioni d'amore (Declarations of Love, 1994)
- L'amico d'infanzia (The Childhood Friend, 1994)
- La stanza accanto (Bitter Chamber, also known as The Room Next Door, 1994, directed by Fabrizio Laurenti)
- Voci notturne (TV serial, 1995, directed by Fabrizio Laurenti)
- Festival (1996)
- L'arcano incantatore (The Mysterious Enchanter, 1996)
- Il testimone dello sposo (The Best Man, 1998)
- La via degli angeli (A Midsummer Night's Dance, 1999)
- I cavalieri che fecero l'impresa (The Knights of the Quest, 2001)
- Il cuore altrove (The Heart Is Elsewhere, also known as The Heart Is Everywhere, 2003)
- La rivincita di Natale (Christmas Rematch, 2004)
- Ma quando arrivano le ragazze? (2005)
- La cena per farli conoscere (2007)
- Il nascondiglio (The Hideout, 2007)
- Il papà di Giovanna (Giovanna's Father, 2008)
- Gli amici del bar Margherita (The Friends at Margherita Café, 2009)
- Il figlio più piccolo (2010)
- Una sconfinata giovinezza (2011)

=== Titles produced ===
- Aiutami a sognare (1981)
- Sposi (1987)
- Storia di ragazzi e di ragazze (1989)
- Bix (1991)
- Io e il re (1996, directed by Lucio Gaudino)
- Il Sindaco (The Mayor, 1996, directed by Ugo Fabrizio Giordani)
- Caro domani (1999, directed by Mariantonio Avati, TV series)
- La prima volta (2000, directed by Massimo Martella)
- Gli amici del bar Margherita (2009)

== Awards and nominations ==
Cannes Film Festival

- 1991: Golden Palm (Bix, nominated)
- 1993: Golden Palm (Magnificat, nominated)
- 2003: Golden Palm (Il cuore altrove, nominated)

David di Donatello Awards

- 1990: Best Director (Storia di ragazzi e di ragazze, nominated)
- 1990: Best Film (Storia di ragazzi e di ragazze, nominated)
- 1990: Best Script (Storia di ragazzi e di ragazze, won)
- 1995: David "Luchino Visconti" Award
- 2003: Best Director (Il cuore altrove, won)
- 2004: Best Director (La rivincita di Natale, nominated)
- 2009: Best Director (Il papà di Giovanna, nominated)
- 2009: Best Producer (Il papà di Giovanna, nominated)

Italian National Syndicate of Film Journalists – Silver Ribbon

- 1984: Best Director (Una gita scolastica, won)
- 1984: Best Story (Una gita scolastica, won)
- 1990: Best Director (Storia di ragazzi e di ragazze, won)
- 1990: Best Screenplay (Storia di ragazzi e di ragazze, won)
- 1997: Best Producer (Festival, won)
- 2000: Best Screenplay (La via degli angeli, nominated)
- 2003: Best Director (Il cuore altrove, nominated)
- 2003: Best Original Story (Il cuore altrove, nominated)

Venice Film Festival

- 2008: Little Golden Lion (Il papà di Giovanna, won)
- 2008: Golden Lion (Il papà di Giovanna, nominated)

Berlin International Film Festival

- 1998: Golden Berlin Bear (Il testimone dello sposo, nominated)

Brussels International Festival of Fantasy Film

- 1998: Silver Raven (L'arcano incantatore, won)

Fantafestival

- 1985: Special Award 'FantaItaly' (won)

Fantasporto

- 1983: International Film Festival Award (La casa dalle finestre che ridono, nominated)

Istanbul International Film Festival

- 1986: Special Prize of the Jury (Noi tre, won)

Montreal World Film Festival

- 2000: Best Screenplay (La via degli angeli, won)
- 2000: Grand Prix des Amériques (La via degli angeli, won)

Puchon International Fantastic Film Festival

- 1998: Jury's Choice Award (L'arcano incantatore, won)

Sannio Film Fest – Capitelli d'oro

- 2009: Silver Raven (Il papà di Giovanna, nominated)

Valladolid International Film Festival

- 1979: Golden Spike (Le strelle nel fosso, won)

== See also ==
- Fantasy film
- University of Bologna
- Lamberto Bava
