= Ornella Muti =

Italian actress (born 1955)

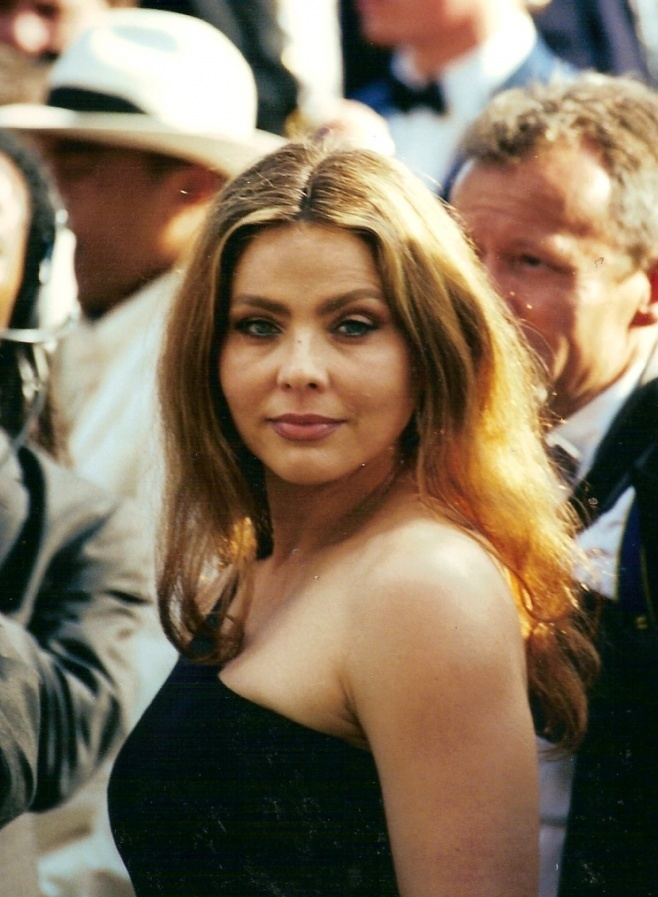
- Muti in 2003
- Born: Francesca Romana Rivelli; 9 March 1955 (age 71); Rome, Italy
- Occupation: Actress
- Years active: 1970–present
- Spouses: Alessio Orano (m. 1975; div. 1981) Federico Fachinetti (m. 1988; div. 1996)
- Children: 3; including Naike Rivelli

Francesca Romana Rivelli (born 9 March 1955), professionally known as Ornella Muti, is an Italian actress.

Among the best-known Italian actresses, in her career, she has worked across various genres, working alongside Italian directors such as Damiano Damiani, Mario Monicelli, Dino Risi, Marco Ferreri, Carlo Verdone, Ettore Scola, Francesca Archibugi, Paolo Virzì, Umberto Lenzi, Francesco Nuti and many others. Outside of Italy, she is best known for her role as Princess Aura in the science fiction cult film Flash Gordon (1980).

== Career ==
Muti was born in Rome to a Neapolitan journalist father Mario Rivelli and Ilse Renate Krause, a Russian Baltic German sculptor from Estonia. Her maternal grandparents had emigrated from Saint Petersburg, Russia to Estonia.

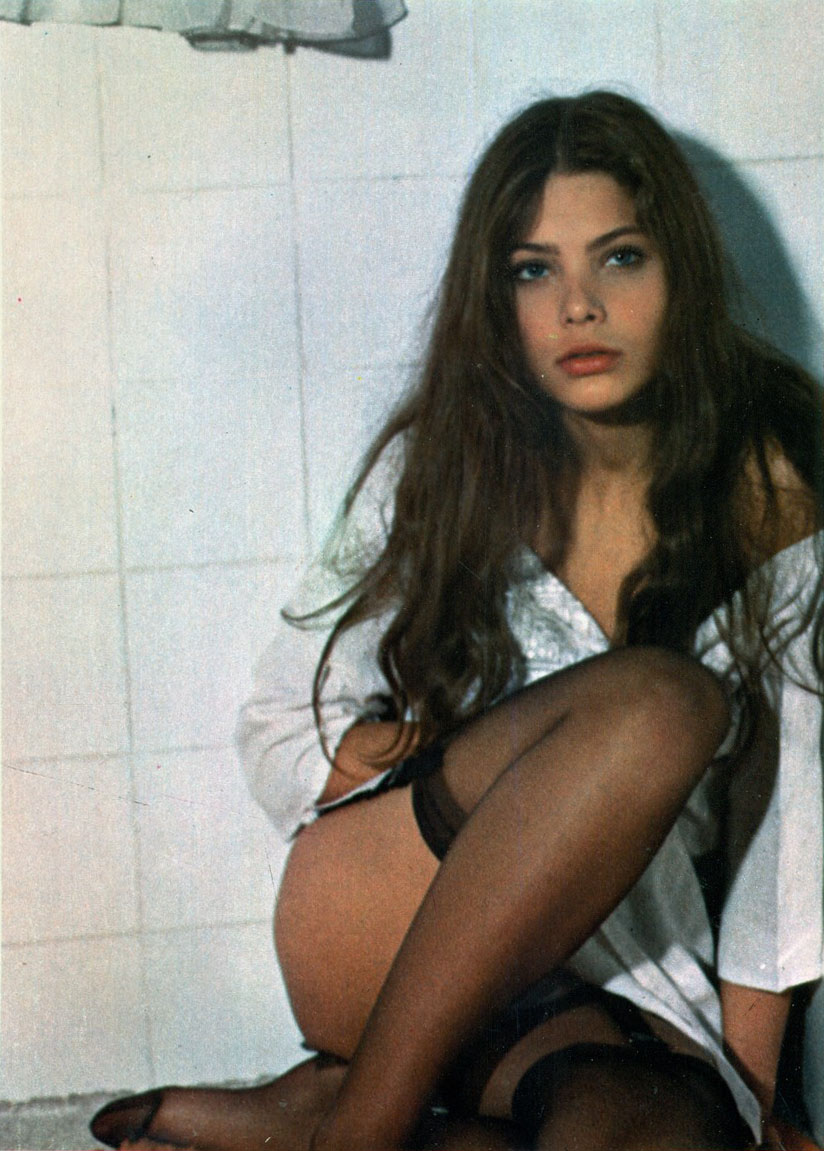
Muti in Appassionata (1974)

Muti modeled as a teenager and made her film debut in the 1970 film La moglie più bella (The Most Beautiful Wife) at the age of fourteen. In the early seventies, thanks to the great success of the film, she starred in numerous comedies, mainly ascribed to the erotic genre. In 1974, she played in the Mario Monicelli Come Home and Meet My Wife, which became a huge success and brought her wide popularity. During the 1970s and 1980s she worked with the most popular Italian actors as Ugo Tognazzi, Vittorio Gassman, Marcello Mastroianni, Carlo Verdone, Renato Pozzetto, Paolo Villaggio, Francesco Nuti, Giancarlo Giannini in successful comedies as Nobody's Perfect, Bonnie and Clyde Italian Style, Rich and Poor, All the Fault of Paradise, Me and My Sister, Tonight at Alice's, and also dramatic movies as The Last Woman, The Bishop's Bedroom, Nest of Vipers, Break Up, Tales of Ordinary Madness and The Future Is Woman.

With Adriano Celentano she made two of the most successful comedies in the history of Italian cinema: The Taming of the Scoundrel and Madly in Love.

In recent years she has alternated between working in independent and mainstream films, TV drama and TV hosting as at the Sanremo Music Festival in 2022.

She is one of the few Italian actresses to achieve an international career across Europe where she has worked with Pedro Masó, Francisco Lara Polop, Mario Camus, Vicente Aranda, Lucas Belvaux, Georges Lautner, Volker Schlöndorff, Mike Hodges, Anthony Hickox, Mike Figgis, Peter Greenaway, and Grigory Chukhray. Her best known movies in Europe are Swann in Love in which she acted with Jeremy Irons and Alain Delon, The Bilingual Lover where she starred with Javier Bardem, Hotel, with Salma Hayek, David Schwimmer, Lucy Liu, Burt Reynolds, and John Malkovich, and The Tulse Luper Suitcases, Part 1: The Moab Story, a multimedia project by Peter Greenaway.

In the United States she has worked with directors such as Woody Allen, John Landis, Eugene Levy, Buddy Giovinazzo and James Toback. She appeared also in Love and Money, Oscar, Once upon a Crime, Somewhere in the City and To Rome with Love and in the American TV movies Casanova, Wait Until Spring, Bandini, A Season of Giants and one episode of The Hitchhiker TV series.

In 1981, she turned down the lead role (later given to Carole Bouquet) in For Your Eyes Only because her costume designer, Wayne Finkelman, was not hired by the production.

In May 2025, she joined the cast of Bertrand Mandico's upcoming film Roma Elastica.

== Personal life ==
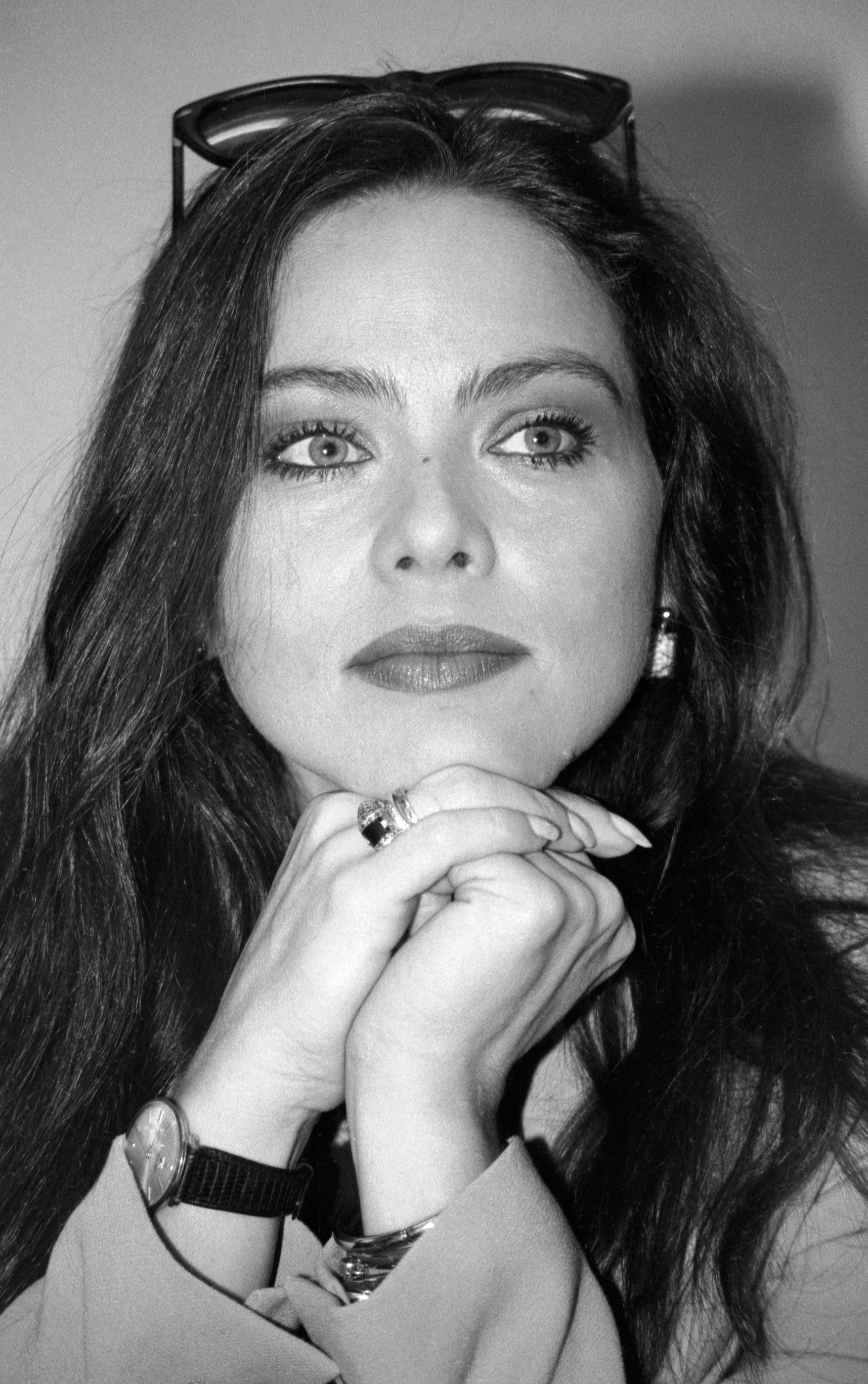
Muti during her visit in Moscow, October 1995

In 1999, she insured her breasts for $350,000.

In 2008, Muti introduced her own line of jewellery and subsequently opened several shops around the world.

In 2015, the Italian court of Pordenone sentenced her to eight months in prison for having cancelled a theatrical performance following a health problem, which did not prevent her from participating in a social dinner with Vladimir Putin in Saint Petersburg in December 2010. She avoided prison by paying 30,000 euros to the Verdi theatre as compensation.

Muti has been married twice, first to Alessio Orano, her co-star from The Most Beautiful Wife, Summer Affair, and Experiencia prematrimonial, from 1975 to 1981. She was married, secondly, to Federico Fachinetti, from 1988 to 1996. Muti has three children, including Naike Rivelli.

In 1994, she became a resident of Monaco.

On 1 February 2022, she announced that she would like to obtain Russian citizenship. She told TASS: "It would be nice for me to get citizenship, because it is part of my culture associated with my mother. She died this year, and it would be a gift for her."

In July 2022, Muti was criticised by right-wing and conservative politicians for supporting the legalisation of cannabis in Italy.

== Filmography ==
Key
†	Denotes films that have not yet been released

=== Films ===
Film roles showing year released, title, role played, director and notes.
Title	Year	Role	Director	Notes
The Most Beautiful Wife	1970	Francesca Cimarosa	Damiano Damiani	
Summer Affair	1971	Lisa	Giorgio Stegani	Also known as Sun on the Skin
Oasis of Fear	1971	Ingrid Sjoman	Umberto Lenzi	
The House of the Doves	1972	Sandra Ruvo	Claudio Guerín	
Experiencia prematrimonial	1972	Alejandra Espinosa	Pedro Masó	
Fiorina la vacca	1972	Teresa	Vittorio De Sisti	
The Nun and the Devil	1973	Sister Isabella	Domenico Paolella	
Italian Graffiti	1973	Santuzza Morano	Alfio Caltabiano	
The Sensual Man	1973	Giovanna	Marco Vicario	
Una chica y un señor/ L'amante adolescente	1974	Caridad	Pedro Masó	
Cebo para una adolescente/ La segretaria/ Bait for an Adolescent	1974	Maribel	Francisco Lara Polop	
Appassionata	1974	Eugenia Rutelli	Gianluigi Calderone	
Come Home and Meet My Wife	1974	Vincenzina Rotunno	Mario Monicelli	
La Joven casada	1975	Camino	Mario Camus	
Pure as a Lily	1976	Lucia Mantuso	Franco Rossi	
The Last Woman	1976	Valeria	Marco Ferreri	
The Bishop's Bedroom	1977	Matilde Scrosati	Dino Risi	
Death of a Corrupt Man	1977	Valérie	Georges Lautner	
Viva l'Italia!	1977	Hitchhiking young woman and Stewardess	Mario Monicelli, Dino Risi, Ettore Scola	Also known as I Nuovi Mostri, segments: "Autostop" and "Senza parole"
Nest of Vipers	1978	Elena Mazzarini	Tonino Cervi	
First Love	1978	Renata Mazzetti	Dino Risi	
Break Up	1978	Ursenna "Sena"	Enrico Maria Salerno	
Neapolitan Mystery	1979	Lucia Navarro	Sergio Corbucci	
Life Is Beautiful	1979	Maria	Grigory Chukhray	
The Taming of the Scoundrel	1980	Lisa Silvestri	Castellano & Pipolo	
Flash Gordon	1980	Princess Aura	Mike Hodges	
Tales of Ordinary Madness	1981	Cass	Marco Ferreri	
Nobody's Perfect	1981	Chantal	Pasquale Festa Campanile	
Madly in Love	1981	Cristina	Castellano & Pipolo	
The Girl from Trieste	1982	Nicole	Pasquale Festa Campanile	
Love and Money	1982	Catherine	James Toback	
Bonnie and Clyde Italian Style	1983	Rosetta Foschini	Steno	
Rich and Poor	1983	Marta Nannuzzi	Pasquale Festa Campanile	
Swann in Love	1983	Odette	Volker Schlöndorff	
The Future Is Woman	1984	Malvinia	Marco Ferreri	
All the Fault of Paradise	1985	Celeste	Francesco Nuti	
Department Stores	1986	Luisa	Castellano & Pipolo	
Bewitched	1986	Anna	Francesco Nuti	
Chronicle of a Death Foretold	1987	Angela Vicario	Francesco Rosi	
Me and My Sister	1987	Silvia	Carlo Verdone	
Private Access	1988	Anna	Francesco Maselli	
The Sparrow's Fluttering	1988	Silvana	Gianfranco Mingozzi	
The King of Naples	1988	Maria Sophie of Bavaria	Luigi Magni	
Wait Until Spring, Bandini	1989	Maria Bandini	Dominique Deruddere	
Captain Fracassa's Journey	1990	Serafine	Ettore Scola	
Tonight at Alice's	1990	Alice	Carlo Verdone	
Oscar	1991	Sofia Provolone	John Landis	
Especially on Sunday	1991	Anna	Giuseppe Tornatore, Marco Tullio Giordana, Giuseppe Bertolucci, Francesco Barilli	Segment: "La domenica specialmente"
Count Max	1991	Isabella Matignon	Christian De Sica	
Vacanze di Natale '91	1991	Giuliana	Enrico Oldoini	
Once Upon a Crime	1992	Elena	Eugene Levy	
Non chiamatemi Omar	1992	Viola	Sergio Staino	
The Bilingual Lover	1993	Norma Valenti	Vicente Aranda	
Tatiana, la muñeca rusa	1995	Tatiana	Santiago San Miguel	
Stella's Favor	1996	Stella	Giancarlo Scarchilli	
Somewhere in the City	1998	Marta	Ramin Niami	
Dirty Linen	1999	Bruna	Mario Monicelli	
The Unscarred	2000	Raffaella	Buddy Giovinazzo	
Tomorrow	2001	Stefania Zarenghi	Francesca Archibugi	
Una lunga lunga lunga notte d'amore	2001	Egle	Luciano Emmer	
Last Run	2001	Danny	Anthony Hickox	
Hotel	2001	Flamenco spokesperson	Mike Figgis	Cameo appearance
Aprés la vie	2002	Cécile Rivet	Lucas Belvaux	
On the Run	2002	Cécile Costes	Lucas Belvaux	
An Amazing Couple	2002	Cécile Costes	Lucas Belvaux	
Uomini & donne, amori & bugie	2003	Anna	Eleonora Giorgi	
The Tulse Luper Suitcases, Part 1: The Moab Story	2003	Mathilde Figura	Peter Greenaway	
People	2004	Aphrodita	Fabien Onteniente	
The Heart Is Deceitful Above All Things	2004	Grandma	Asia Argento	
Dimmi di sì	2004	Francesca	Juan Calvo	
La bambina dalle mani sporche	2005	Wanda Rosso	Renzo Martinelli	
Civico zero	2007	Nina	Francesco Maselli	
Ripopolare la reggia	2007	Marchesa	Peter Greenaway	
Io non ci casco	2008	Miss Lamberti	Pasquale Falcone	
To Rome with Love	2012	Pia Fusari	Woody Allen	
Checkmate	2016	Penury	Jason Bradbury	Short film
Magical Nights	2018	Federica	Paolo Virzì	
Wine to Love - I colori dell'amore	2018	Anna	Domenico Fortunato	
Mare di grano	2018	Ornella	Fabrizio Guarducci	
The Christmas Show	2022	Rita	Alberto Ferrari	
Roma Elastica †	2026	TBA	Bertrand Mandico	Completed

=== Television ===
Television roles showing year released, title, role played, network, and notes
Title	Year	Role	Original network	Notes
The Hitchhiker	1986	Sister Theresa	HBO	Episode: "True Believer"
Casanova	1987	Henriette	ABC	Television film
A Season of Giants	1989	Onoria	Rai 1	Television film
Il Grande Fausto	1994	Giulia Occhini	Rai 1	Miniseries
L'avvocato Porta	1997	Chiara	Canale 5	Main role (season 1); 4 episodes
The Count of Monte Cristo	1998	Mercedes Iguanada	TF1	Miniseries
Esther	1999	Vashti	Rai 1	Television film
Lo zio d'America	2002	Maria Monticelli	Rai 1	Main role (season 1); 8 episodes
Chi l'avrebbe mai detto	2006	Emma	Rai 1	Miniseries
Il sangue e la rosa	2008	Barbara Forleis	Canale 5	Main role
Doc West	2009	Debra Downing	Canale 5	Television film
Sirene	2017	Ingrid	Rai 1	Main role; 6 episodes
