= Saviane =

Saviane is an Italian surname. Notable people with the surname include:

- Giorgio Saviane (1916–2000), Italian author
- Paolo Saviane (1962–2021), Italian politician

== See also ==
- Saviano (surname)
