= Diary of a Maniac =

1993 film

- Film poster
- Directed by: Marco Ferreri
- Written by: Marco Ferreri; Liliane Betti
- Produced by: Vittorio Alliata
- Starring: Jerry Calà; Sabrina Ferilli
- Cinematography: Mario Vulpiani
- Edited by: Ruggero Mastroianni
- Music by: Victorio Pezzolla
- Release date: 18 February 1993
- Running time: 94 minutes
- Country: Italy
- Language: Italian

Diary of a Maniac (Italian: Diario di un vizio) is a 1993 Italian drama film directed by Marco Ferreri. It was entered into the 43rd Berlin International Film Festival.

== Cast ==
- Jerry Calà as Benito Balducci
- Sabrina Ferilli as Luigia
- Valentino Macchi as Chiominto
- Laetitia Laneri as Marisa
- Massimo Bucchi as Don Giuseppe
- Anna Duska Bisconti
- Luciana De Falco
- Cinzia Monreale
- Doriana Bianchi
- Maria Rosa Moratti

== See also ==
- List of Italian films of 1993
