= Frosini (surname) =

Frosini is a surname. Notable people with the surname include:

- Alessandro Frosini (born 1972), Italian basketball player
- Deanna Milvia Frosini (1940–2021), Italian actress and painter
- Francesco Frosini (1654–1733), archbishop of Pisa
- Kyra Frosini (1773–1800), Greek socialite
- Luciano Frosini (1927–2017), Italian racing cyclist
- Pietro Frosini (1885–1951), Italian accordionist and vaudeville performer
