= Teo Usuelli =

Italian composer

Teo Usuelli (13 December 1920 – 13 April 2009) was an Italian composer.

Born in Reggio Emilia in 1920, he studied music at the Giuseppe Verdi Conservatory in Milan, where he was graduated in choral music and composition. During the Second World War, he had fought with the Italian partisans, then he moved to Rome, where he began his career as composer.

He is probably best known for the main theme of the 1972 giallo film Amuck!, "Piacere Sequence", that was later used in The Big Lebowski, in the TV-series Spaced and in the documentary film How to Draw a Bunny. He frequently worked with director Marco Ferreri on films such as The Conjugal Bed (1963), The Ape Woman (1964), Countersex (1964), The Man, the Woman and the Money (1965), The Man with the Balloons (1965), Dillinger Is Dead (1969), The Seed of Man (1969), and The Audience (1972).

His other film scores include Saul and David (1964), The Great Leaders (1965), Operation Atlantis (1965), The Seventh Floor (1967), Strogoff (1970), The Bloodstained Lawn (1973), and Il solco di pesca (1976).
