= The Seed of Man =

- Directed by: Marco Ferreri
- Written by: Marco Ferreri; Sergio Bazzini
- Starring: Anne Wiazemsky; Marco Margine; Annie Girardot
- Cinematography: Mario Vulpiani
- Edited by: Enzo Micarelli
- Music by: Teo Usuelli
- Distributed by: Cineriz
- Release date: 1969
- Running time: 113 minutes
- Countries: France; Italy
- Language: Italian

The Seed of Man (Italian: Il seme dell'uomo, French: La Semence de l'homme) is a 1969 Italian-French film co-written and directed by Marco Ferreri.

== Plot ==
A young couple argue about having a child in the days after a global plague wipes out most of Earth's population.

== Cast ==
- Anne Wiazemsky as Dora
- Marzio Margine as Cino
- Annie Girardot as Foreign Woman
- Rada Rassimov as Blonde Woman
- Maria Teresa Piaggio as Curly-haired Woman
- Milvia Frosini as Priest
- Angela Pagano as Nun
- Adriano Aprà as Journalist
- Mario Vulpiani as Major
