= Liza (1972 film) =

1972 film

- Film poster
- Directed by: Marco Ferreri
- Written by: Ennio Flaiano; Jean-Claude Carrière; Marco Ferreri
- Based on: "Melampus" by Ennio Flaiano
- Produced by: Ralph Baum; Raymond Danon; Alfred Levy
- Starring: Catherine Deneuve; Marcello Mastroianni
- Cinematography: Mario Vulpiani
- Edited by: Giuliana Trippa
- Music by: Philippe Sarde
- Release date: 3 May 1972
- Running time: 100 minutes
- Country: Italy
- Language: Italian
- Box office: $1.76 million

Liza (Italian: La cagna, lit. 'The Bitch') is a 1972 Italian drama film directed by Marco Ferreri. It is based on the short story "Melampus" by Ennio Flaiano.

== Plot ==
Giorgio, a middle-aged artist, lives in total solitude on a tiny, uninhabited island in the Strait of Bonifacio. His only companion is his dog, Melampo; he spends his days fishing, walking, collecting whatever the sea washes ashore, and drawing comic strips. One day, a sailboat stops near the beach; Liza, a blonde woman, dives in and—after yet another argument with the friends and partner (Ludwig) she is vacationing with—gets herself left behind on the island. Giorgio is reluctantly forced to host the intruder in his eccentric bunker-like home; after spending the night together, he takes her back to the mainland the following day.

Fascinated by the taciturn hermit, Liza decides to return to the island to be with him. However, she realizes that while Giorgio appreciates having a young lover, he remains largely indifferent to her presence otherwise, preferring to spend his time "conversing" with his faithful dog, Melampo. Driven by jealousy, she cruelly causes the dog's death, forcing it to swim until it drowns from exhaustion. She then decides to play the role of a "female dog" to capture the man's full attention; he seems to willingly accept this game of dominance and submission.

This strange idyll is short-lived, as Giorgio is forced to return to Paris—and the family he had abandoned—after his teenage son informs him that his mother has attempted suicide. Before leaving the island, he asks Liza to wait for him, promising to return soon. Back in civilization, Giorgio resumes the bourgeois life he had fled, but the "female dog" has followed her "master" and urges him to return with her to the island, where they can live out their exclusive relationship. One day, the sea carries off their inflatable boat—their only means of reaching the mainland—leaving the two men completely cut off from the world. Deprived of provisions and unable to sustain themselves by fishing alone, they soon face starvation and attempt to leave the island by air in a surplus wartime plane that Giorgio has somehow managed to repair.

== Cast ==
- Catherine Deneuve as Liza
- Marcello Mastroianni as Giorgio
- Corinne Marchand as Giorgio's wife
- Michel Piccoli as Giorgio's friend
- Pascal Laperrousaz as Giorgio's son
- Dominique Marcas as Maid
- Valérie Stroh as Giorgio's daughter
- Claudia Bianchi
- Enrico Blasi
- Mauro Benedetti
- Claudine Berg as Liza's friend
- Luigi Antonio Guerra

== Production ==
Ennio Flaiano originally adapted his novella *Melampus* into a screenplay with the intention of making his directorial debut, but the project never materialized. Although credited with the screenplay for the film directed by Marco Ferreri—alongside the director himself and Jean-Claude Carrière—Flaiano played no part in the actual production and would likely not have appreciated the radical changes made to his work.

Filming took place almost entirely on the islands of Lavezzi and Cavallo, with the exception of a few sequences set in Paris.

== Reception ==
The film recorded admissions of 293,854 in France.

The Dizionario Morandini praised the film as a "bitter parable about loneliness in a degraded world, unfolding in a confined space, with flashes of irony and misogyny", admiring its "high stylistic quality." Paolo Mereghetti described the film as "a transitional work in Ferreri's filmography, though successful in its own right."

=== Style ===
Although the subject matter—a sadomasochistic relationship—is seemingly intense, Ferreri chooses to treat it with extreme detachment, as if unwilling to share in the despair of his characters who have no future, telling the story "without sadism or morbid indulgence." The narrative is fragmented, reduced to numerous short sequences—resembling notes or rough drafts.
