= The Audience (film) =

1972 Italian–French film

- Film poster
- Directed by: Marco Ferreri
- Written by: Marco Ferreri (scenario and screenplay); Dante Matelli (screenplay); Rafael Azcona (scenario)
- Produced by: Franco Cristaldi
- Starring: Enzo Jannacci; Claudia Cardinale; Ugo Tognazzi; Michel Piccoli; Vittorio Gassman
- Cinematography: Mario Vulpiani
- Edited by: Giuliana Trippa
- Music by: Teo Usuelli
- Production companies: La Vides Cinematografica; Les Films Ariane
- Distributed by: Gruppo Editoriale Bramante; Tamasa Distribution
- Release dates: 31 March 1972 (Italy); 12 January 1973 (France)
- Running time: 111 minutes
- Countries: Italy; France
- Languages: Italian; French

The Audience (Italian: L'udienza, French: L'Audience) is a 1972 Italian–French satirical drama film directed by Marco Ferreri. In 2008, the film was included in the Italian Ministry of Cultural Heritage's 100 Italian films to be saved, a list of 100 films that "have changed the collective memory of the country between 1942 and 1978."

== Plot ==
Amedeo, a young officer on leave, has come to Rome to have a private audience with the pope. He is put under the surveillance of police officer Diaz, who introduces him to prostitute Aiché with the intent to distract him. Amedeo and Aiché start an affair, but Amedeo still follows his plan, making the acquaintance of a series of clerics in the hope that they will help him. After all his attempts fail and his methods to make contact with the pope become increasingly obtrusive, he is first sent to a Jesuit monastery and later to a mental hospital. Eventually, he dies under the colonnades of St. Peter's Square from pneumonia, where his body is identified by Diaz. Diaz is then called to take care of a young man waiting at the entry of the Vatican, who declares that he wants a private audience with the pope.

== Cast ==
- Enzo Jannacci – Amedeo
- Claudia Cardinale – Aiché
- Ugo Tognazzi – Aureliano Diaz
- Michel Piccoli – Padre Amerin
- Vittorio Gassman – Principe Donati
- Alain Cuny – Jesuit
- Daniele Dublino – Padre Ambrogio
- Sigelfrido Rossi – Giovanni Rossi
- Irena Oberberg – Sister (as Irene Oberberg)
- Enrique Bergier – Don Matteo (as Man Lerer Bergier)
- Dante Cleri – Jesuit
- Luigi Scavran – Padre
- Giuseppe Ravenna – Jesuit
- Mario Jannilli – Swiss guard
- Enzo Mondino – Jesuit
- Attilio Pelegatti – Padre (as Attilio Pellegatti)
- Bruno Bertocci – policeman

== Awards ==
- FIPRESCI Award at the 22nd Berlin International Film Festival
