= The Quicksand War: Prelude to Vietnam =

- Author: Lucien Bodard
- Publication date: 1967

The Quicksand War: Prelude to Vietnam is a book by Lucien Bodard published in 1967 about the First Indochina War, which it asserts to be a prelude to the Vietnam War. Originally published in 2 French volumes, L'Enlisement and L'Humiliation, it was combined into a single book and translated by Patrick O'Brian.

Lucien Bodard was one of the best-known French foreign correspondents and was an expert on Indochina; he knew the Far East as few Europeans could know it, for not only did he spend most of his working life there but he was born in Chongqing.
