= Break Up (1978 film) =

1978 film

- Directed by: Enrico Maria Salerno
- Written by: Massimo De Rita; Arduino Maiuri; Enrico Maria Salerno
- Starring: Ornella Muti; Tony Musante
- Cinematography: Marcello Gatti
- Music by: Daniele Patucchi
- Release date: 1978
- Language: Italian

Break Up (Italian: Eutanasia di un amore) is a 1978 Italian romance drama film directed by Enrico Maria Salerno.

It is based on the novel Eutanasia di un amore by Giorgio Saviane.

== Plot ==
A professor in Italy, Paolo, is devastated when his longtime girlfriend, and former student, Sena, leaves him without telling him why or leaving a letter. He's fixated on seeing her again. She leaves for Paris and he sees her with another man, so he heads back to Italy. Sena eventually comes back and they reconcile.

== Cast ==
- Ornella Muti as Ussena (aka Sena)
- Tony Musante as Paolo Naviase
- Monica Guerritore as The Other Woman
- Mario Scaccia as The Doctor
- Laura Trotter as Patrizia
- Gerardo Amato as Domenico

== See also ==
- List of Italian films of 1978
