= Summer Affair =

1971 drama film

- Directed by: Giorgio Stegani
- Screenplay by: Giorgio Stegani
- Produced by: Gianni Minervini; Nicolò Pomilia
- Starring: Ornella Muti; Alessio Orano
- Cinematography: Sergio D'Offizi
- Edited by: Maurizio Tedesco; Giuseppe Baghdighian
- Music by: Gianni Marchetti
- Release date: 1971
- Language: Italian

Summer Affair (Italian: Il sole nella pelle), also known as Sun on the Skin, is a 1971 Italian romantic drama film written and directed by Giorgio Stegani and starring Ornella Muti.

== Cast ==
- Ornella Muti as Lisa
- Alessio Orano as Robert
- Luigi Pistilli as Lo Versi
- Chris Avram as Marco
- Stella Carnacina as Marina Carracelli
- Giulio Baraghini as Carabinieri Marshal

== Production ==
The film was shot in the Ponza island. It was produced by Stefano Film. The script took inspiration from a real news story. The main theme of the soundtrack by Gianni Marchetti was reused in Emanuelle's Revenge.

== Release ==
The film was released domestically in June 1971. In 2025, MVD Entertainment Group released it on Blu-ray in a 2K transfer.

== Reception ==
Paolo Mereghetti panned the film, describing it as "a mediocre fumetto, sprinkled with awkward references to current affairs and sparse nudity." A La Stampa contemporary review paired it to Love Story, and noted "Stegani leans honestly on sentimentality, without exploring the context in which the story unfolds and without demanding much from the two leads in terms of performance". The Corriere della Sera's critic Leonardo Autera argued that the film "pretends to take an interest in important issues [...] but in reality it neither can nor wants to touch on them", as "it's just a pretext for a rather banal love story."
