= Michel Piccoli =

French actor (1925–2020)

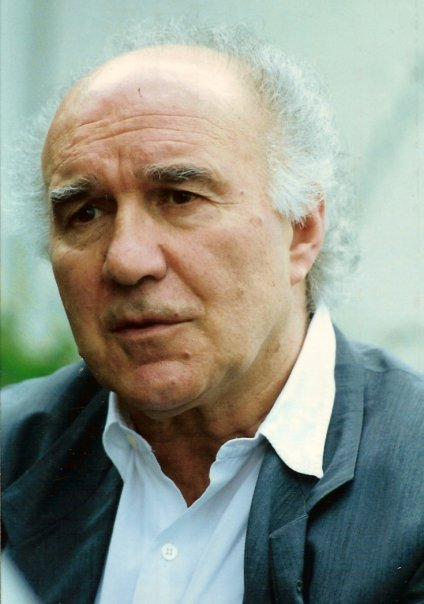
- Piccoli at the 1993 Cannes Film Festival
- Born: Jacques Daniel Michel Piccoli; 27 December 1925; Paris, France
- Died: 12 May 2020 (aged 94); Saint-Philbert-sur-Risle, France
- Occupations: Actor; screenwriter; director; musician; singer
- Years active: 1945–2015
- Spouses: Eléonore Hirt (m. 1954; div. 1965) Juliette Gréco (m. 1966; div. 1977) Ludivine Clerc (m. 1980)
- Children: 3

Signature
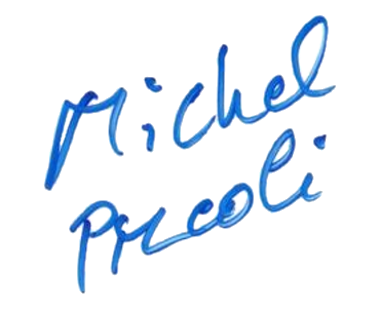

Jacques Daniel Michel Piccoli (27 December 1925 – 12 May 2020) was a French actor, producer and film director with a career spanning 70 years. He was lauded as one of the greatest French character actors of his generation who played a wide variety of roles and worked with many acclaimed directors, being awarded with a Best Actor Award at the Cannes Film Festival and a Silver Bear for Best Actor at the Berlin Film Festival.

== Life and career ==
Piccoli was born in Paris to a musical family; his mother Marcelle Expert-Bezançon was a pianist and his father Henri Piccoli was a violinist whose Swiss grandfather was from the canton of Ticino.

He appeared in many different roles, from seducer to cop to gangster to Pope, in more than 170 movies. He appeared in six films directed by Luis Buñuel including Belle de Jour (1967) and The Discreet Charm of the Bourgeoisie (1972), but also appeared as Brigitte Bardot's husband in Jean-Luc Godard's Contempt (1963) and as the main antagonist in Alfred Hitchcock's Topaz (1969). He also appeared in many films by Claude Sautet, sometimes co-starring in them with Romy Schneider, and became a frequent collaborator of director Marco Ferreri, with whom he worked on several films, including Dillinger Is Dead and La Grande Bouffe. In 1973 he starred in Luis García Berlanga's Grandeur nature (Life Size), a controversial film that suffered censorship during the Franco era and was not released in Spain until 1978.

In the 1990s, Piccoli also worked as a director on three films. One of his last leading roles was his portrayal of a depressed, newly elected pope in Nanni Moretti's We Have a Pope (2011), for which he was awarded with the David di Donatello Award for Best Actor.

=== Political views ===
Piccoli was part of the Saint-Germain-des-Prés circle in the 1950s, which included Jean-Paul Sartre and Simone de Beauvoir. He was a member of the French Communist Party in this era. A lifelong left-winger, he objected to repression in the Soviet bloc, and supported the Solidarity trade union in Poland.

=== Personal life and death ===
Piccoli married three times and divorced twice. His first marriage was to Éléonore Hirt. They had one daughter together. He was then married for eleven years to singer Juliette Gréco. His final marriage was to Ludivine Clerc, with whom he adopted a daughter and a son.

Piccoli died from complications of a stroke on 12 May 2020, at the age of 94.

== Europe Theatre Prize ==
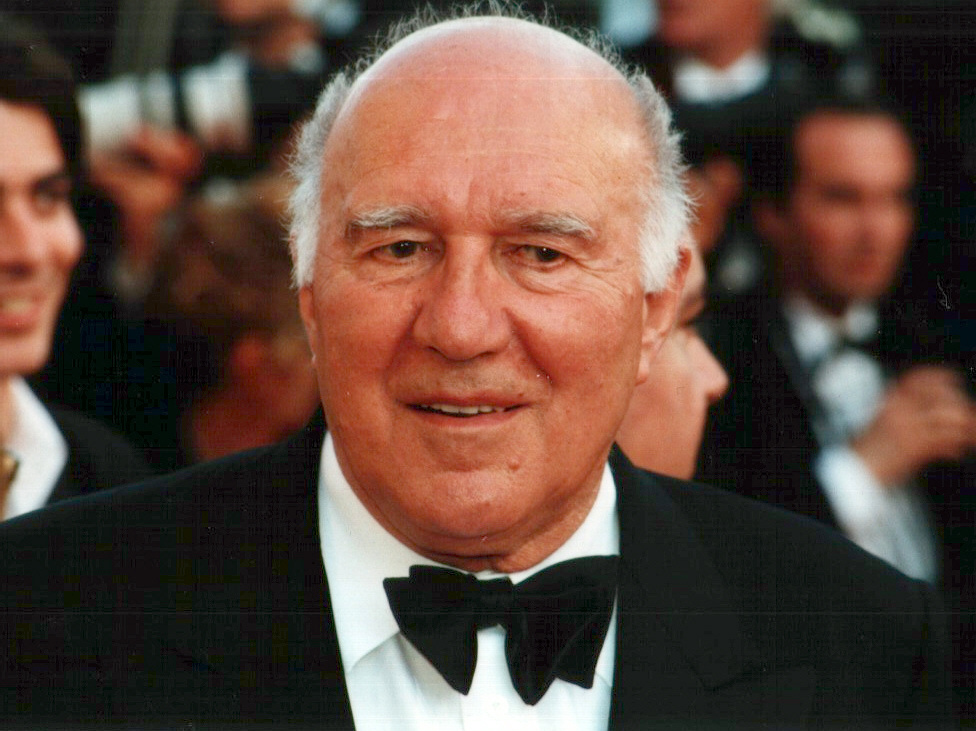
Piccoli in 2000

In 2001, he was awarded the IX Europe Theatre Prize, in Taormina, with the following citation:

Michel Piccoli began his career on the stage - his Don Juan remains celebrated - before crossing to the "other shore", the cinema, finally coming to accept the relativity of travelling back and forth between the two and taking full advantage of their potential interaction. Piccoli captivates us because he is halfway between the clearly defined identity of the film actor and the ductile identity of the stage actor. When Bondy, Brook, and Chéreau turned to him, despite his reputation as a cinema performer, it was undoubtedly because of this receptiveness and adaptability. He was not trapped by an image, but brought a unique presence. He was also ready to take on an unprecedented variety of roles, which took him from Schnitzler to Chekhov and Pirandello, from Shakespeare to Koltès. The film actor was able of step back and make way for his double, the stage actor. What is it that we love about Piccoli? The fact that he is an artist who has lasted over time without turning into an effigy… he provides certainty and maintains a hidden dimension. The light does not expel the shadow, which always accompanies the brilliance of the legendary actor that he is. There is nothing one-dimensional about him. Michel Piccoli is a European figure. In him we do not see so much an international star unaware of borders, but an open-minded actor who strives to cross them. A free citizen, he does not want to become a prisoner and his whole life bears witness to this unquenched desire to go beyond limits. National as well as artistic limits. Michel Piccoli refuses civil indifference. He has never lacked commitment, and has always taken sides and got involved. His ethic is constant, whether as an actor or as a citizen. If he is taken as a model, it is always despite himself. He is not a hero who puts himself on display. More than anyone else, Piccoli has managed to maintain his humanity. A vibrant humanity that continues to guide his actions and his words. Michel Piccoli is an exemplary actor, responsible towards himself and towards his art.

== Filmography ==
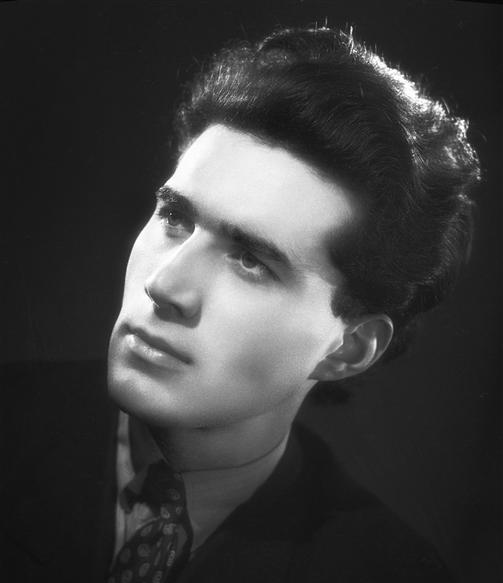
Piccoli in 1945

Year	Title	Director	Role	Notes
1945	The Bellman	Christian-Jaque	A villager	Uncredited
1949	Daybreak	Louis Daquin	Georges Gohelle	
1949	The Perfume of the Lady in Black	Louis Daquin	Lebel	
1951	Without Leaving an Address	Jean-Paul Le Chanois	A journalist in the archives	Uncredited
1954	Destinées	Jean Delannoy; Christian-Jaque; Marcello Pagliero	Pasquerel	(segment Jeanne)
1954	Tout chante autour de moi	Pierre Gout	Reverdier	
1955	The Price of Love	Maurice de Canonge	Georges	
1955	French Cancan	Jean Renoir	Captain Valorgueil	
1955	Bad Liaisons	Alexandre Astruc	An inspector	
1955	Ernst Thälmann	Kurt Maetzig	Rouger	
1955	The Grand Maneuver	René Clair	An officer	Uncredited
1956	Shadow of the Guillotine	Jean Delannoy	The refractory priest	
1956	Death in the Garden	Luis Buñuel	Father Lizardi	
1957	The Crucible	Raymond Rouleau	James Putnam	
1957	Nathalie	Christian-Jaque	Inspector Franck Marchal	
1958	Rafles sur la ville	Pierre Chenal	Inspector Paul Vardier	
1958	Les copains du dimanche	Henri Aisner	The director of the flying club	
1958	Tabarin	Richard Pottier	Jacques Forestier	
1959	La Bête à l'affût	Pierre Chenal	Commissioner Jacques Guimard	
1960	La dragée haute	Jean Kerchner	Hugo Barsac	
1960	Le Bal des espions	Michel Clément	Brian Cannon	
1961	Amazons of Rome	Carlo Ludovico Bragaglia; Vittorio Cottafavi; Peter O'Cord	Console Publicola	
1961	Rendezvous	Jean Delannoy	Paul	
1961	Les Petits Drames	Paul Vecchiali	Surgeon	
1962	Adieu Philippine	Jacques Rozier	Actor playing 'Izquierdo'	Uncredited
1962	Climats	Stellio Lorenzi	François Crozant	
1963	Le Doulos	Jean-Pierre Melville	Nuttheccio	
1963	The Day and the Hour	René Clément	Antoine	
1963	Contempt	Jean-Luc Godard	Paul Javal	
1964	Diary of a Chambermaid	Luis Buñuel	M. Monteil	
1964	La Chance et l'Amour	Bertrand Tavernier; Claude Berri; Charles L. Bitsch; Éric Schlumberger	Philippe Decharme	(segment Lucky la chance)
1964	All About Loving	Jean Aurel	Raoul	
1964	Salut Les Cubains!	Agnès Varda	Himself	
1965	Masquerade	Basil Dearden	George Sarrassin	
1965	Dom Juan ou le Festin de Pierre	Marcel Bluwal	Dom Juan	
1965	Le Coup de grâce	Jean Cayrol; Claude Durand	Capri / Bruno	
1965	The Sleeping Car Murders	Costa-Gavras	René Cabourg	
1965	Lady L	Peter Ustinov	Lecoeur	
1966	The War Is Over	Alain Resnais	First customs inspector	
1966	Les Ruses du diable	Paul Vecchiali	The antique dealer	
1966	The Game Is Over	Roger Vadim	Alexandre Saccard	
1966	La Voleuse	Jean Chapot	Werner Kreuz	
1966	Les Créatures	Agnès Varda	Edgar Piccoli	
1966	Is Paris Burning?	René Clément	Edgard Pisani	
1967	The Young Girls of Rochefort	Jacques Demy	Simon Dame	
1967	Shock Troops	Costa-Gavras	The Extra Man	
1967	Belle de jour	Luis Buñuel	Henri Husson	
1967	My Love, My Love	Nadine Trintignant	Marrades	
1968	Benjamin	Michel Deville	Count Philippe de Saint-German	
1968	Danger: Diabolik	Mario Bava	Inspector Ginko	
1968	La Chamade	Alain Cavalier	Charles	
1968	La prisonnière	Henri-Georges Clouzot	The guest in a hurry at the opening	Uncredited
1969	Dillinger Is Dead	Marco Ferreri	Glauco	
1969	The Milky Way	Luis Buñuel	Marquis de Sade	
1969	L'Invitée	Vittorio De Seta	François Desailly	
1969	Topaz	Alfred Hitchcock	Jacques Granville	
1970	The Things of Life	Claude Sautet	Pierre Bérard	
1970	Invasion	Yves Allégret	Marcello	
1971	Max et les ferrailleurs	Claude Sautet	Max	
1971	La Poudre d'escampette	Philippe de Broca	Valentin	
1971	Ten Days' Wonder	Claude Chabrol	Paul Regis	
1972	The Audience	Marco Ferreri	Father Amerin	
1972	Liza	Marco Ferreri	Giorgio's friend	
1972	The Discreet Charm of the Bourgeoisie	Luis Buñuel	Minister of the Interior	
1972	The Assassination	Yves Boisset	Colonel Kassar	
1972	César and Rosalie	Narrator	Claude Sautet	Voice
1973	The Woman in Blue	Michel Deville	Pierre	
1973	Themroc	Claude Faraldo	Themroc	
1973	Wedding in Blood	Claude Chabrol	Pierre Maury	
1973	La Grande Bouffe	Marco Ferreri	Michel	
1973	Far West	Jacques Brel	Indian Chief	
1974	Don't Touch the White Woman!	Marco Ferreri	Buffalo Bill	
1974	Un amour de pluie	Voix seulement	Jean-Claude Brialy	Voice
1974	Le Trio infernal	Francis Girod	Georges Sarret	
1974	Tamaño natural	Luis García Berlanga	Michel	
1974	The Phantom of Liberty	Luis Buñuel	Second Prefect	
1974	Vincent, François, Paul and the Others	Claude Sautet	François	
1974	E cominciò il viaggio nella vertigine		Toni de Gregorio	
1975	La smagliatura	Peter Fleischmann	Investigator	
1975	Leonor	Juan Luis Buñuel	Richard	
1975	7 morts sur ordonnance	Jacques Rouffio	Dr. Pierre Losseray	
1976	The Last Woman	Marco Ferreri	Michel	
1976	Todo modo	Elio Petri	Lui	
1976	F comme Fairbanks	Maurice Dugowson	Etienne	
1976	Mado	Claude Sautet	Simon Léotard	
1977	René la Canne	Francis Girod	Inspector Marchand	
1977	The Accuser	Jean-Louis Bertucelli	Saint-Ramé	
1977	Spoiled Children	Bertrand Tavernier	Bernard Rougerie	
1978	La Part du feu	Étienne Périer	Robert Hansen	
1978	Strauberg ist da	Strauberg	Mischa Gallé	
1978	The Savage State	Francis Girod	Orlaville	
1978	La petite fille en velours bleu	Alan Bridges	Conrad Brukner	
1978	Le sucre	Jacques Rouffio	Grezillo	
1979	Neapolitan Mystery	Sergio Corbucci	Victor Navarro	
1979	Le divorcement	Philippe	Pierre Barouh	
1979	Le mors aux dents	Pierre Chazerand	Laurent Heynemann	
1980	A Leap in the Dark	Marco Bellocchio	Mauro Ponticelli	
1980	Der Preis fürs Überleben	Hans Noever	René Winterhalter	
1980	Atlantic City	Louis Malle	Joseph	
1981	The Prodigal Daughter	Jacques Doillon	The Father	
1981	Confused Feelings	Étienne Périer	The Professor	TV movie
1981	Strange Affair	Pierre Granier-Deferre	Bertrand Malair	
1982	Espion, lève-toi	Yves Boisset	Jean-Paul Chance	
1982	The Passerby	Jacques Rouffio	Max Baumstein	
1982	That Night in Varennes	Ettore Scola	King Louis XVI	Uncredited
1982	Passion	Jean-Luc Godard	Michel Boulard	
1982	The Eyes, the Mouth	Marco Bellocchio	Uncle Agostino	
1982	Beyond the Door	Liliana Cavani	Mr. Mutti	
1982	Une chambre en ville	Jacques Demy	Edmond Leroyer	
1982	Que les gros salaires lèvent le doigt !	Denys Granier-Deferre	José Viss	
1983	Le Prix du Danger	Yves Boisset	Frédéric Mallaire	
1983	The General of the Dead Army	Luciano Tovoli	Benetandi	
1984	Dangerous Moves	Richard Dembo	Akiva Liebskind	
1984	Viva la vie	Claude Lelouch	Michel Perrin	
1984	Success Is the Best Revenge	Jerzy Skolimowski	French Officer	
1984	Le matelot 512	René Allio	Récitant	Voice
1985	Death in a French Garden	Michel Deville	Graham Tombsthay	
1985	Partir, revenir	Claude Lelouch	Simon Lerner	
1985	Adieu Bonaparte	Youssef Chahine	Caffarelli	
1986	My Brother-in-Law Killed My Sister	Jacques Rouffio	Etienne Sembadel	
1986	Le Paltoquet	Michel Deville	Le Paltoquet	
1986	Mauvais Sang	Leos Carax	Marc	
1986	La Puritaine	Jacques Doillon	Pierre	
1987	La rumba	Roger Hanin	Damien Malleville	
1987	The Distant Land	Luc Bondy	Friedrich Hofreiter	
1987	The Veiled Man	Maroun Bagdadi	Kassar	
1987	Maladie d'amour	Jacques Deray	Raoul Bergeron	
1988	Come sono buoni i bianchi	Marco Ferreri	Father Jean-Marie	
1988	Blanc de Chine	Denys Granier-Deferre	Batz	
1990	May Fools	Louis Malle	Milou	
1990	Martha and I	Jiří Weiss	Ernst Fuchs	
1991	La Belle Noiseuse	Jacques Rivette	Edouard Frenhofer	
1991	The Children Thief	Christian de Chalonge	M. Armand	
1991	Walking a Tightrope	Nikos Papatakis	Marcel Spadice	
1992	Divertimento	Jacques Rivette	Edouard Frenhofer	
1992	Le Bal des casse-pieds	Yves Robert	Désiré	
1992	Archipel	Pierre Granier-Deferre	Leonard Wilde	
1992	La vie crevée	Guillaume Nicloux	Raymond	
1992	The Supper	Édouard Molinaro	François-René de Chateaubriand	Voice
1993	La cavale des fous	Marco Pico	Henri Toussaint	
1993	Rupture(s)	Christine Citti	Paul	
1994	Al-Mohager	Youssef Chahine	Adam	
1994	L'ange noir	Jean-Claude Brisseau	Georges Feuvrier	
1995	Les Cent et une Nuits de Simon Cinéma	Agnès Varda	Simon Cinéma	
1996	Beaumarchais	Édouard Molinaro	Prince de Conti	
1996	Traveling Companion	Peter Del Monte	Cosimo	
1996	Party	Manoel de Oliveira	Michel	
1996	Tykho Moon	Enki Bilal	Mac Bee	
1997	Genealogies of a Crime	Raúl Ruiz	Georges Didier	
1997	Passion in the Desert	Lavinia Currier	Jean-Michel Venture de Paradis	
1999	Rien sur Robert	Pascal Bonitzer	Lord Ariel Chatwick-West	
1999	Le plus beau pays du monde	Marcel Bluwal	Récitant (fin du film)	Voice
1999	Libero Burro	Sergio Castellitto	Uncle Toni	
1999	París-Tombuctú	Luis García Berlanga	Michel des Assantes	
2000	Les Acteurs	Bertrand Blier	Himself	
2000	Tout va bien, on s'en va	Claude Mouriéras	Louis	
2001	I'm Going Home	Manoel de Oliveira	Gilbert Valence	
2002	Divine Intervention	Elia Suleiman	Santa Claus Breathing	Voice
2003	That Day	Raúl Ruiz	Harald	
2003	Raining Cats and Frogs	Jacques-Rémy Girerd	Ferdinand	Voice
2003	Little Lili	Claude Miller	Actor playing Simon	
2005	C'est pas tout à fait la vie dont j'avais rêvé			Director and Writer
2005	Magic Mirror	Manoel de Oliveira	Prof. Heschel	
2006	Gardens in Autumn	Otar Iosseliani	Marie	
2006	Belle Toujours	Manoel de Oliveira	Henri Husson	
2007	The Duchess of Langeais	Jacques Rivette	Vidame de Pamiers	
2007	Boxes	Jane Birkin	Father	
2007	Les Toits de Paris	Huner Saleem	Marcel	
2008	On War	Bertrand Bonello	Le grand Hou	
2008	The Dust of Time	Theodoros Angelopoulos	Spyros	
2009	L'insurgée	Laurent Perreau	Maurice Reverdy	
2011	We Have a Pope	Nanni Moretti	Cardinal Melville / The Pope	
2012	You Ain't Seen Nothin' Yet	Alain Resnais	Himself	
2012	Holy Motors	Leos Carax	Man with birthmark	
2012	Lines of Wellington	Valeria Sarmiento	Leópold Scheitzer	
2014	Le goût des myrtilles	Thomas de Thier	Michel	

== Awards and nominations ==
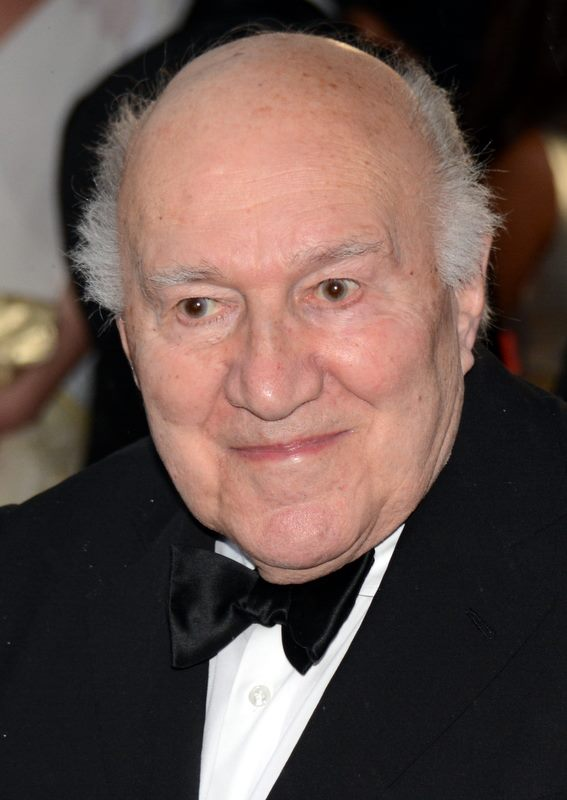
Piccoli in 2013

- Cannes Film Festival
  - 1980: Best Actor Award for A Leap in the Dark
- Berlin Film Festival
  - 1982: Silver Bear for Best Actor for Strange Affair
- Locarno Festival
  - 2007: Best Actor Award for Les Toits de Paris
  - 2007: Excellence Award
- César Awards
  - 1981: Nominated for the César Award for Best Actor for Strange Affair
  - 1984: Nominated for the César Award for Best Actor for Dangerous Moves
  - 1990: Nominated for the César Award for Best Actor for May Fools
  - 1991: Nominated for the César Award for Best Actor for La Belle Noiseuse
- Shanghai International Film Festival
  - 1997: Golden Goblet Award for Best Actor for Traveling Companion
- David di Donatello Awards
  - 2012: David di Donatello for Best Actor for We Have a Pope
- European Film Awards
  - 2001: Nominated for the European Film Award for Best Actor for I'm Going Home
  - 2007: Nominated for the European Film Award for Best Actor for Belle Toujours
  - 2011: Honorary Award
  - 2011: Nominated for the European Film Award for Best Actor for We Have a Pope
- Europe Theatre Prize - 2001
