= The Future Is Woman =

1984 film

- Italian theatrical release poster by Renato Casaro
- Directed by: Marco Ferreri
- Written by: Piera Degli Esposti; Marco Ferreri; Dacia Maraini
- Produced by: Erwin C. Dietrich; Achille Manzotti; Luciano Luna
- Starring: Ornella Muti; Hanna Schygulla; Niels Arestrup
- Cinematography: Tonino Delli Colli
- Edited by: Ruggero Mastroianni
- Music by: Carlo Savina
- Release date: 1984
- Running time: 99 minutes
- Country: Italy
- Language: Italian

The Future Is Woman (Italian: Il futuro è donna) is a 1984 Italian drama film directed and written by Marco Ferreri. The film entered the competition at the 41st Venice International Film Festival.

== Plot ==
At a crowded nightclub, Malvina, a pregnant girl is harassed and tossed around by a group of thugs. Anna is present, who rescues her from the attack and takes her to her home, where she lives with her partner Gordon. A sexually allusive relationship is then established between the three of them: there is no shortage of sex scenes, but Anna seems to pour into her new friend's impending motherhood the enthusiasm she has not been able to have so far herself, having never had children.

One day, while the three are attending a live concert by Italian singer Pierangelo Bertoli, a group of drifters bursts into the sports hall: clashes ensue in which Gordon loses his life as a result of a hard blow to the head while trying to protect Malvina. After the palasport is evacuated, a shocked Bertoli resumes the concert in front of the now nearly deserted stands, with the trio of protagonists still in place despite the lifeless body of one of them. The unborn child, on the other hand, is safe. Now the two women tighten their relationship even more: they leave the city and stop at a beach, where Malvina's child will be born. After giving birth, the latter departs without a word, leaving the baby in Anna's hands.

== Cast ==
- Ornella Muti as Malvina
- Hanna Schygulla as Anna
- Niels Arestrup as Gordon
- Isabella Biagini as Anna's friend
- Maurizio Donadoni as Sergio
- Michele Bovenzi as the chief
- Laura Morante as Piera
- Solveig D'Assunta as Eugenia
- Pierangelo Bertoli as himself
- Piera Degli Esposti

== See also ==
- List of Italian films of 1984
