= Don't Touch the White Woman! =

1974 film by Marco Ferreri

- Theatrical release poster by Jean Giraud
- French: Touche pas à la femme blanche !
- Directed by: Marco Ferreri
- Written by: Marco Ferreri; Rafael Azcona
- Produced by: Jean-Pierre Rassam; Jean Yanne; Alain Sarde; François Rochas
- Starring: Catherine Deneuve; Marcello Mastroianni; Michel Piccoli; Philippe Noiret; Ugo Tognazzi; Serge Reggiani; Darry Cowl; Alain Cuny
- Cinematography: Étienne Becker
- Edited by: Ruggero Mastroianni
- Music by: Philippe Sarde
- Production companies: Mara Films; Films 66; Laser Production; PEA
- Distributed by: CFDC (France)
- Release dates: 23 January 1974 (France); 12 March 1975 (Italy)
- Running time: 110 minutes
- Countries: France; Italy
- Language: French
- Box office: $1,402,866

Don't Touch the White Woman! (French: Touche pas à la femme blanche !) is a 1974 French-Italian Western comedy film co-written and directed by Marco Ferreri.

== Plot ==
A fictionalized version of Custer's Last Stand, set at a real building site in Paris, France. Marcello Mastroianni stars as General George Armstrong Custer. Buffalo Bill Cody (Michel Piccoli) portrays a charlatan media impresario. Ugo Tognazzi gives a fictional portrayal of Mitch Bouyer, one of Custer's Native American scouts, who runs a business selling Native artifacts made in sweatshops by white women. Alain Cuny plays Sitting Bull who must defend his people when their apartment building homes are destroyed by the Union Cavalry. The film climaxes with the Battle of the Little Bighorn held in a large construction excavation where Les Halles market once was.

== Cast ==
- Catherine Deneuve as Marie-Hélène de Boismonfrais
- Marcello Mastroianni as George A. Custer
- Michel Piccoli as Buffalo Bill
- Philippe Noiret as Gen. Terry
- Ugo Tognazzi as Mitch
- Alain Cuny as Sitting Bull
- Serge Reggiani as The Mad Indian
- Darry Cowl as Major Archibald
- Monique Chaumette as Sister Lucie
- Daniele Dublino as daughter
- Henri Piccoli as Sitting Bull's father
- Franca Bettoia as Rayon de Lune (as Franca Bettoja)
- Paolo Villaggio as CIA agent
- Franco Fabrizi as Tom (as Franco Fabrizzi)
- Laurente Vedres as (as Vedres et Boutang)

== See also ==
- Mr. Freedom
- Blazing Saddles
- Revisionist Western
- Cultural depictions of George Armstrong Custer
