= Ugo Tognazzi =

Italian actor (1922–1990)

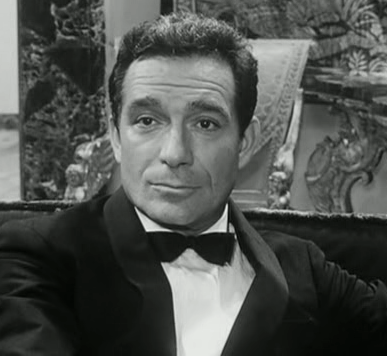
- Tognazzi in The Magnificent Cuckold (1964)
- Born: Ottavio Tognazzi; 23 March 1922; Cremona, Kingdom of Italy
- Died: 27 October 1990 (aged 68); Rome, Italy
- Resting place: Velletri, Italy
- Occupations: Actor; director; screenwriter
- Years active: 1950–1990
- Height: 1.70 m (5 ft 7 in)
- Political party: Radical Party
- Spouse(s): Margarete Robsahm (m. 1963; div. 1966) Franca Bettoia (m. 1972)
- Children: 4 (Ricky, Gianmarco, Maria, Thomas)

Ottavio "Ugo" Tognazzi (23 March 1922 – 27 October 1990) was an Italian actor, director, and screenwriter. He is considered one of the most important faces of Italian comedy together with Vittorio Gassman, Nino Manfredi, Marcello Mastroianni, and Alberto Sordi.

== Early life ==
Tognazzi was born in Cremona in northern Italy but spent his youth in various localities as his father was a travelling clerk for an insurance company.

After his return to his native city in 1936, Tognazzi worked in a cured meats production plant where he achieved the position of accountant. During World War II he was inducted into the Army and returned home after the Armistice of 8 September 1943, and joined the Black Brigades for a while. His passion for theater and acting dates from his early years, and also during the conflict when he organized shows for his fellow soldiers. In 1945, he moved to Milan, where he was enrolled in the theatrical company led by Wanda Osiris. A few years later, he formed his own successful musical revue company.

== Career ==
In 1950, Tognazzi made his cinematic debut in The Cadets of Gascony directed by Mario Mattoli. The following year, he met Raimondo Vianello, with whom he formed a successful comedy duo for the new-born RAI TV (1954–1960). Their shows, sometimes containing satirical material, were among the first to be censored on Italian television.

After the successful role in The Fascist (Il Federale) (1961), directed by Luciano Salce, Tognazzi became one of the most renowned characters of the so-called Commedia all'Italiana (Italian comedy style). He worked with all the main directors of Italian cinema, including Mario Monicelli (My Friends), Marco Ferreri (La Grande Bouffe), Carlo Lizzani (La vita agra), Dino Risi, Pier Paolo Pasolini (Pigsty), Ettore Scola, Alberto Lattuada, Nanni Loy, Pupi Avati and others. Tognazzi also directed some of his films, including the 1967 film The Seventh Floor. The film was entered into the 17th Berlin International Film Festival.

Roger Vadim cast Tognazzi as Mark Hand, the Catchman, in Barbarella (1968). He rescues Barbarella (Jane Fonda) from the biting dolls she encounters, and after her rescue, he requests payment by asking her to have sex with him (the "old-fashioned" way, not the psycho-cardiopathic way of their future).

In 1981, Tognazzi won the Best Male Actor Award at the Cannes Film Festival for Tragedy of a Ridiculous Man, directed by Bernardo Bertolucci. While he worked primarily in Italian cinema, Tognazzi is perhaps best remembered for his role as Renato Baldi, the gay owner of a St. Tropez nightclub, in the 1978 French comedy La Cage aux Folles, which became the highest grossing foreign film ever released in the U.S.

== Personal life and death ==
Tognazzi had various relationships during his life. He was married to actresses Margarete Robsahm and later Franca Bettoia. He had four children from three different women: his sons Ricky (born 1955) and Gianmarco (born 1967) are actors; another son, Thomas (born 1964), is a film director and producer; his daughter, Maria (born 1971), is also a film director.

Tognazzi died on 27 October 1990, aged 68, in Rome, from a intracerebral hemorrhage. There were rumors that his chronic depression led to suicide. He is buried in the cemetery of Velletri.

== Filmography ==
=== Actor ===
- The Cadets of Gascony (1950) as Ugo Bossi
- La paura fa 90 (1951) as Anastasio Lapin / Saverio Bompignac
- Una bruna indiavolata (1951) as Carlo Soldi
- Auguri e figli maschi (1951) as Mario
- The Enchanting Enemy (1953) as Direttore della fabbrica
- Love in the City (1953) as Himself (segment "Italiani si voltano, Gli")
- Sua altezza ha detto: no! (1953) as Ronchi
- Siamo tutti milanesi (1953) as Filippo
- If You Won a Hundred Million (1953) as Ugo (segment "Il principale")
- Café Chantant (1953) as Se stesso / Himself
- Assi alla ribalta (1954) as Himself
- Laugh! Laugh! Laugh! (1954) as Dottore
- Milanese in Naples (1954) as Franco Baraldi
- La moglie è uguale per tutti (1955) as Ugo
- Domenica è sempre domenica (1958) as Ugo
- Toto in the Moon (1958) as Achille Paoloni
- Mia nonna poliziotto (1958) as Lucio
- Marinai, donne e guai (1958) as Domenico Campana
- Il terribile Teodoro (1958)
- Guardatele ma non toccatele (1959) as Maresciallo Valentino La Notte
- Fantasmi e ladri (1959) as Gaetano
- Non perdiamo la testa (1959) as Tony Cuccar
- Policarpo (1959) as The Starched Professor (uncredited)
- Le cameriere (1959) as Mario, il Ladro
- Le Confident de ces dames (1959) as Cesar
- Noi siamo due evasi (1959) as Bernardo Cesarotti
- La duchessa di Santa Lucia (1959) as L'avvocato
- La cambiale (1959) as Alfredo Balzarini
- La pica sul Pacifico (1959) as Roberto De Nobel
- Tipi da spiaggia (1959) as Pasubio Giovinezza
- The Sheriff (1959) as Colorado Joe
- I baccanali di Tiberio (1960) as Primo, the Driver
- Genitori in blue jeans (1960) as Renzino
- Il principe fusto (1960) as Frate
- My Friend, Dr. Jekyll (1960) as Professor Fabius / Giacinto Floria
- Le olimpiadi dei mariti (1960) as Ugo Bitetti
- Femmine di lusso (1960) as Ugo Lemeni
- Un dollaro di fifa (1960) as Alamo
- Tu che ne dici? (1960) as Solitario
- Some Like It Cold (1960) as Ugo Bevilacqua
- Gli incensurati (1961) as Farinon
- Sua Eccellenza si fermò a mangiare (1961) as Ernesto
- The Joy of Living (1961) as 1. Anarchist
- The Fascist (1961) as Primo Arcovazzi
- Cinque marines per cento ragazze (1961) as Sergente Imparato
- La ragazza di mille mesi (1961) as Maurizio d'Alteni
- His Women (1961) as Stefano Garbelli (uncredited)
- I magnifici tre (1961) as Domingo
- Pugni pupe e marinai (1961) as Capo Campana / Tognazzi
- Una domenica d'estate (1962)
- Crazy Desire (1962) as Antonio Berlinghieri
- Psycosissimo (1962) as Ugo Bertolazzi
- A Girl... and a Million (1962) as Un automobilista (uncredited)
- I tromboni di fra' Diavolo (1962) as Sergente Visicato
- I motorizzati (1962) as Achille Pestani
- March on Rome (1962) as Umberto Gavazza
- La donna degli altri è sempre più bella (1963) as Himself (segment "La luna di miele")
- The Shortest Day (1963) as Pecoraio
- Ro.Go.Pa.G. (1963) as Togni (segment "Il pollo ruspante")
- The Hours of Love (1963) as Gianni
- The Conjugal Bed (1963) as Alfonso
- I mostri (1963) as The Father (segment "L'Educazione sentimentale"); Policeman (segment "Il Mostro"); Stefano (segment "Come un Padre"); Battacchi (segment "Il povero Soldato"); L'Onorevole (segment "La Giornata dell'Onorevole"); Latin Lover (segment "Latin Lovers-Amanti latini"); Pilade Fioravanti (segment "Testimone volontario"); The Traffic Warden (segment "L'Agguato"); The Car Owner (segment "Vernissage"); The Man at Cinema (segment "Scenda l'Oblio"); The Husband (segment "L'Oppio dei Popoli"); Guarnacci (segment "La nobile Arte")
- Outlaws of Love (1963) as Vasco Timballo
- Le motorizzate (1963)
- La donna degli altri è sempre più bella (1963) as Himself (segment "La luna di miele")
- High Infidelity (1964) as Cesare (segment "Gente Moderna")
- Liolà (1964) as Liolà
- The Ape Woman (1964) as Antonio Focaccia
- La vita agra (1964) as Luciano Bianchi
- The Magnificent Cuckold (1964) as Andrea Artusi
- Countersex (1964) as The professor (segment "Professore, Il")
- Run for Your Wife (1965) as Riccardo Vanzi
- I Complessi (1965) as Prof. Gildo Beozi (segment "Il Complesso della Schiava nubiana")
- I Knew Her Well (1965) as Gigi Baggini
- Kiss the Other Sheik (1965) as Man With Car (segment "L'uomo dei 5 palloni") (uncredited)
- Menage all'italiana (1965) as Carlo Vignola Federico Valdesi
- Break-up (1965) as Man With Car
- Follie d'estate (1966)
- Marcia nuziale (1966) as Frank
- A Question of Honour (1966) as Efisio Mulas
- Our Husbands (1966) as Appuntato Umberto Codegato (segment "Il Marito di Attilia")
- Pleasant Nights (1966) as Uguccione de' Tornaquinci
- The Seventh Floor (1967) as Giuseppe Inzerna
- The Climax (1967) as Sergio Masini
- The Head of the Family (1967) as Remo
- Gli altri, gli altri... e noi (1967)
- Her Harem (1967) as Himself (uncredited)
- Torture Me But Kill Me with Kisses (1968) as Umberto Ciceri
- Barbarella (1968) as Mark Hand
- Dismissed on His Wedding Night (1968) as Oscar Pettini
- La bambolona (1968) as Giulio Broggini
- Satyricon (1969) as Trimalchione
- Pigsty (1969) as Herdhitze
- Police Chief Pepe (1969) as Commissario Antonio Pepe
- The Conspirators (1969) as Cardinal Agostino Rivarola
- Lonely Hearts (1970) as Stefano
- Venga a prendere il caffè... da noi (1970) as Emerenziano Paronzini
- Splendori e miserie di Madame Royale (1970) as Alessio / Madame Royale
- Lady Caliph (1970) as Annibale Doberdò - il proprietario della fabbrica
- La supertestimone (1971) as Marino Bottecchia detto 'Mocassino'
- In the Name of the Italian People (1971) as Mariano Bonifazi
- Stanza 17-17, palazzo delle tasse, ufficio imposte (1971) as Ugo La Strizza
- This Kind of Love (1972) as Federico / Federico's father
- The Audience (1972) as Aureliano Diaz
- The Master and Margaret (1972) as Nikolaj Afanasijevic Maksudov 'Maestro'
- Il generale dorme in piedi (1972) as Col. Umberto Leone
- We Want the Colonels (1973) as Onorevole Giuseppe 'Beppe' Tritoni
- La Grande Bouffe (1973) as Ugo
- Property Is No Longer a Theft (1973) as The Butcher
- Don't Touch the White Woman! (1974) as Mitch
- Claretta and Ben (1974) as Gino Pistone
- Come Home and Meet My Wife (1974) as Giulio Basletti
- La mazurka del barone, della santa e del fico fiorone (1975) as Baron Anteo Pellacani
- Weak Spot (1975) as Georgis
- My Friends (1975) as Lello Mascetti
- Duck in Orange Sauce (1975) as Livio Stefani
- Al piacere di rivederla (1976) as Mario Aldara
- The Career of a Chambermaid (1976) as Adelmo
- Evil Thoughts (1976) as Mario Marani
- Goodnight, Ladies and Gentlemen (1976) as General in Toilet
- The Bishop's Bedroom (1977) as Temistocle Mario Orimbelli
- Beach House (1977) as Alfredo Cerquetti
- The Cat (1977) as Amedeo Pecoraro
- I nuovi mostri (1977) as Il marito (segment "L'uccellino della Val Padana") / Il cuoco (segment "Hostaria") / Il figlio (segment "Mammina mammona")
- Nenè (1977) as 'Baffo' - the barber (uncredited)
- The Payoff (1978) as Il commissario Assenza
- First Love (1978) as Ugo
- La Cage aux Folles (1978) as Renato Baldi
- Where Are You Going on Holiday? (1978) as Enrico (segment "Sarò tutta per te")
- Traffic Jam (1979) as Professor
- I viaggiatori della sera (1979) as Orso Banti
- I'm Photogenic (1980) as Himself (uncredited)
- La terrazza (1980) as Amedeo
- Arrivano i bersaglieri (1980) as Don Prospero
- Sunday Lovers (1980) as Armando (segment "Armando's Notebook")
- La Cage aux Folles II (1980) as Renato Baldi
- Tragedy of a Ridiculous Man (1981) as Primo Spaggiari
- Scusa se è poco (1982) as Carlo Reani
- All My Friends Part 2 (1982) as Conte Raffaello Mascetti
- The Key (1983) as Un ubriaco (cameo)
- A Joke of Destiny (1983) as On. Vincenzo De Andreiis
- Petomaniac (1983) as Joseph Pujol
- Dagobert (1984) as La pape Honorius et son sosie
- Bertoldo, Bertoldino e Cacasenno (1984) as Bertoldo
- Fatto su misura (1984) as Dottor Nathan
- La Cage aux folles 3 - 'Elles' se marient (1985) as Renato Baldi
- Amici miei – Atto III (1985) as Lello Mascetti
- The Last Minute (1987) as Walter Ferroni
- Arrivederci e grazie (1988) as Carlo
- Days of Inspector Ambrosio (1988) as Giulio Ambrosio
- Tolérance (1989) as Marmant
- The Battle of the Three Kings (1990) as Carlo di Palma

=== Director ===
- Il mantenuto (1961)
- Il fischio al naso (1967)
- Dismissed on His Wedding Night (1968)
- Cattivi pensieri (1976)
- I viaggiatori della sera (1979)
