= Lucien Bodard =

French reporter

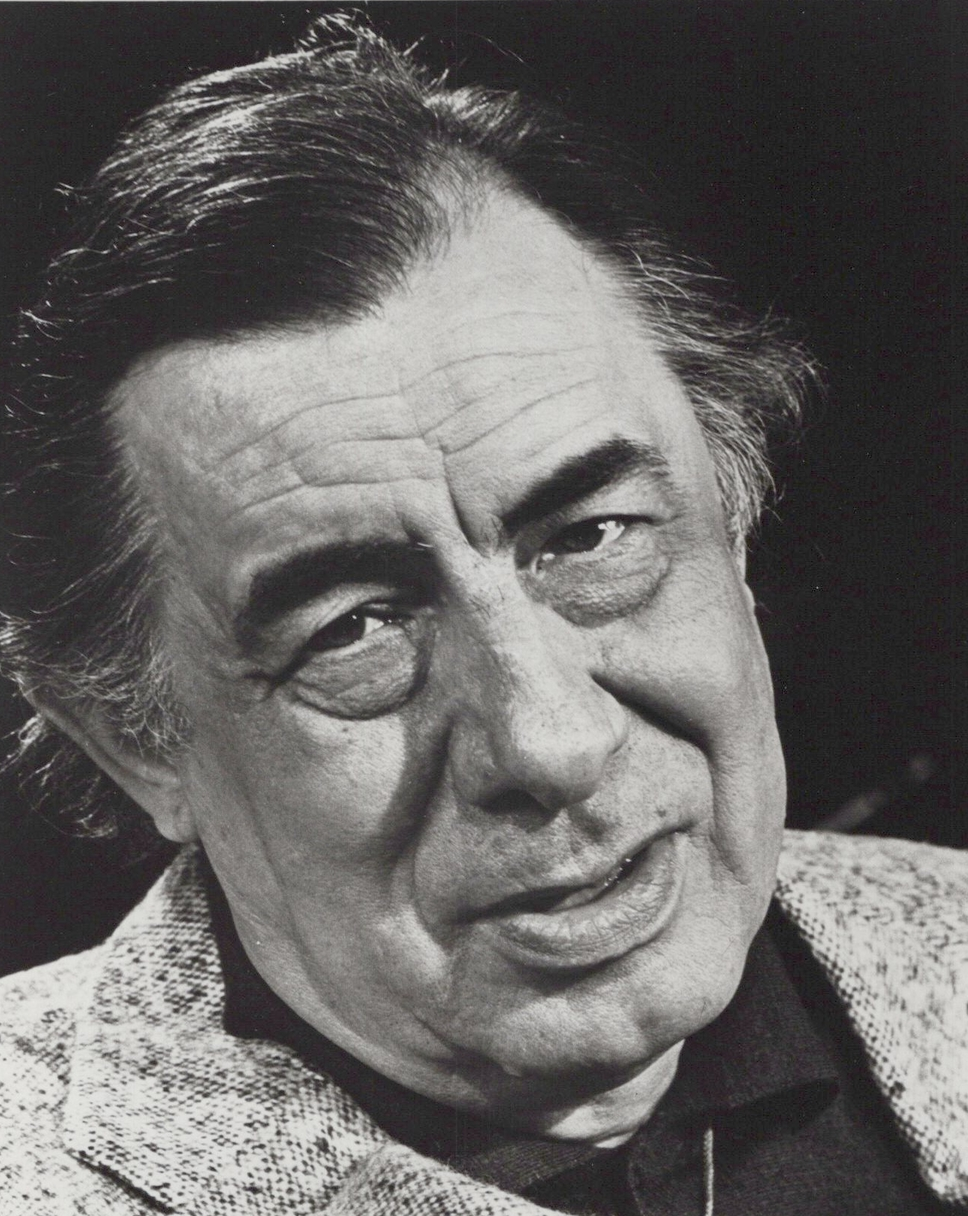
- Bodard in 1972
- Born: January 9, 1914; Chongqing
- Died: March 2, 1998 (aged 84)
- Occupations: Reporter and writer
- Relatives: Albert Bodard
- Writing career
- Language: Chinese
- Subject: Events in Asia
- Notable work: The Quicksand War: Prelude to Vietnam
- Notable awards: Prix Interallié

Lucien Bodard (9 January 1914 – 2 March 1998) was a Chinese-born French reporter, and writer on events in East and Southeast Asia, such as the First Indochina War and the Vietnam War.

== Life ==
Bodard was born on January 9, 1914, in Chongqing (central China) to the French consul Albert Bodard, who was stationed in China for several years, including in Chongqing, Chengdu, Kunming and Shanghai. He grew up with the Chinese language and spoke Mandarin fluently as a child. Later on, he moved to Kunming and Shanghai after his father was positioned there. Before he reached adolescence, his mother decided to send Bodard back to France to study in a "decent school".

His experience and knowledge of Asian cultures, mostly Chinese and Vietnamese, gave him a unique perspective on events that shook the Asian world during the first half of the twentieth century. In 1944, he began his career as journalist and was sent to the Far East to cover various topics such as the south-east Asian war and the rise of communist China, First Indochina War. He progressively became one of the most famous French war correspondents for his work during the first French Indochina War and then the beginning of the American Vietnam War, wars which he later described in several books.

As he grew older, in the 1970s, he started writing novels which were essentially based on his knowledge of Asia, starting with his souvenirs when he was a child in China. His rich, baroque, detailed and sometimes humoristic style drew broad applause, and he won several French literary prizes, including the Prix Interallié for "Monsieur le consul", a book on his father while he was the French Consul in Chengdu and the Prix Goncourt for "Anne Marie", a book on the life and personality of his mother. His last book, "Le chien de Mao" (Mao's Dog), on Mao Zedong's third wife Jiang Qing, was published in 1998, the year of his death.

He has been often compared to two other famous 20th century French journalists and novelists, Albert Londres and Joseph Kessel.

== Notable books ==
- The Quicksand War: Prelude to Vietnam (1963)
- La Guerre d'Indochine (1965–1967)
- Les plaisirs de l'Hexagone (1971)
- Monsieur Le Consul (Paris,: B. Grasset, 1973) translated: The French Consul (New York:Knopf, 1977)
- Le Fils Du Consul (Paris: Grasset, 1975) The Consul's Son (1975)
- Anne-Marie (1981)
- Le Chien de Mao (1998)

== Filmography ==
Year	Title	Role	Notes
1966	Une balle au coeur		
1966	Les Créatures	Monsieur Ducasse	
1971	La ville-bidon	Le député-maire	
1986	The Name of the Rose	Cardinal Bertrand	(final film role)

== Biography ==
- Olivier Weber, Lucien Bodard, Un aventurier dans le siècle, Plon, 1997, 1021 pages

== Documentary ==
- Lucien Bodard, dit Lulu le Chinois, a film from Olivier Weber and Michel Vuillermet, France 5, 1998
- Documentary 52': Lucien Bodard
