= La Grande Bouffe =

1973 French–Italian film

- Italian cinema poster
- Directed by: Marco Ferreri
- Written by: Marco Ferreri; Rafael Azcona
- Produced by: Vincent Malle; Jean-Pierre Rassam
- Starring: Marcello Mastroianni; Ugo Tognazzi; Michel Piccoli; Philippe Noiret
- Cinematography: Mario Vulpiani
- Edited by: Claudine Merlin
- Music by: Philippe Sarde
- Release date: 1973
- Running time: 135 minutes; 123 minutes (censored cut)
- Countries: Italy; France
- Languages: Italian; French

La Grande Bouffe (Italian: La grande abbuffata, English titles The Grand Bouffe and Blow-Out) is a 1973 French–Italian satirical film directed by Marco Ferreri. It stars Marcello Mastroianni, Ugo Tognazzi, Michel Piccoli, Philippe Noiret and Andréa Ferréol. The film centres on a group of friends who plan to eat themselves to death. It satirises consumerism and the decadence of the bourgeoisie and was received controversially upon its release, but later gained a cult status.

== Plot ==
The film tells the story of four friends who gather in a villa for the weekend, with the express purpose of eating themselves to death. Bouffer is French slang for "eating" (the Italian abbuffata means "great eating").

The first protagonist is Ugo, owner and chef of a restaurant, "The Biscuit Soup". The second is Philippe, a somewhat important magistrate who still lives with his childhood nanny, Nicole, who is overprotective of him to the point of trying to prevent him from having relationships with other women, and who fulfills her own sexual needs with him. The third character is Marcello, an Alitalia pilot and womaniser. The fourth and final main character is Michel, who is an effeminate television producer. The four come together by car to the beautifully furnished but unused villa owned by Philippe. There they find the old caretaker, Hector, who has innocently prepared everything for the great feast, and a Chinese visitor who is there to offer a job to the magistrate in faraway China, which Philippe politely rejects with the phrase "Timeo Danaos et dona ferentes" ("Beware of Greeks bearing gifts"), quoting Virgil.

Once alone, the four begin their binge. In one scene, Marcello and Ugo race each other to see who can eat oysters faster. They discuss organizing a little "feminine presence" and decide to invite three prostitutes to come to the house the following evening (not four, because Philippe does not want to participate). Their breakfast next day is interrupted by the arrival of a school class who would like to visit the garden of the villa to see the famous "linden tree of Boileau", under which the French poet used to sit while looking for inspiration. The four willingly invite the class not only into the garden, but also to view the old Bugatti in the garage and to a magnificent lunch in the kitchen. Above all, they get to know Andrea, the young and buxom teacher, whom they spontaneously invite to dinner that evening. Philippe is dismayed at the notion of the school teacher being in the same company as three prostitutes; he warns her, but she appears not to be perturbed. The prostitutes arrive in due course, and the atmosphere becomes frivolous and sexually charged, with each of the men howling throughout the film when they are overjoyed. Andrea arrives and embraces the spirit of the party. She is attracted to Philippe, who proposes to marry her.

The eating continues unabated. Ugo is responsible for the preparation of the food. Michel, who seems to have been brought up strictly not to break wind, has indigestion. His friends encourage him to let out whatever wind is trapped.

Frightened and disgusted by the turn of events, the prostitutes flee at dawn and leave only Andrea. She seems to sense the purpose of the protagonists and decides to help them in their efforts, establishing a tacit agreement and remaining with them until the death of all four. She indulges in sex with all the men after the departure of the prostitutes, while joining them in their binge as well.

The first to die is Marcello, after being enraged with his own impotence; he goes to the toilet and causes the sanitary pipes to explode. The bathroom is flooded with sewage, which leaks through the ceiling below, and leaves a noxious smell even after being cleaned up. He becomes exasperated, and realizing the futility of the farce, decides to leave the house at night during a snow storm, in the old Bugatti that he had repaired earlier in the day with great delight. His friends find him the next morning, frozen to death in the driving seat. The first suggestion is to bury Marcello in the garden, but on the advice of Philippe (who, being a judge, warns that there is a severe penalty for the illegal burying of a corpse), they place the body in the villa's cold room, where it remains seated and clearly visible from the kitchen.

After Marcello comes Michel, who finds a new dog in the yard sitting in the Bugatti. Already suffering from indigestion and crammed to capacity with food (he cannot even lift his legs practicing dance, his favourite pastime), he suffers an attack of bowel movements while playing the piano. Amid flatulence and worse, he is finally able to let it all go and collapses on the terrace. His friends place him in the cold room next to Marcello.

Shortly afterwards, the backyard dogs cause a stir (including another new dog), and Ugo prepares an enormous dish made from three different types of liver pâté in the shape of the Dome of Les Invalides, which he serves to the remaining diners, Philippe and Andrea, in the kitchen in view of the two dead friends. It is decorated with eggs, since Jews see them as symbols of death. However, Philippe and Andrea cannot bring themselves to eat it. Philippe goes off to bed, leaving Andrea to keep Ugo company during his determined effort to eat the entire pâté. Some time later, she later calls Philippe back downstairs to help her stop his friend from stuffing himself to death. They cannot dissuade Ugo, and end up attending to him on the kitchen table, the one feeding him, the other masturbating him until he orgasms and dies at the same time. On the advice of Andrea, his body is left on the kitchen table, in his "domain".

The last to die is the diabetic Philippe, on the bench under the lime-tree of Boileau and into the arms of Andrea, after eating a pudding she has made shaped like a pair of breasts. He dies on the bench with Andrea and yet another dog, whom he keeps calling Ugo, just as another delivery of meat arrives. The delivery men react with incomprehension when Andrea instructs them to leave the meat—whole animals, and sides of pork and beef – in the garden (the kitchen and the cold room now containing the bodies of Ugo, Marcello, and Michel). The film ends bizarrely with a scene of the garden filled with dogs who begin chasing and dining on the poultry and meat carcasses.

== Cast ==
- Marcello Mastroianni as Marcello
- Philippe Noiret as Philippe
- Michel Piccoli as Michel
- Ugo Tognazzi as Ugo
- Andréa Ferréol as Andréa
- Florence Giorgetti as Anne
- Solange Blondeau as Danielle
- Cordelia Piccoli as Barbara

== Production ==
Andréa Ferréol had to gain 25 kilos in two months to get the role.

== Awards ==
La Grande Bouffe received the FIPRESCI Prize given by the International Federation of Film Critics at the 1973 Cannes Film Festival, which it shared with Jean Eustache's The Mother and the Whore. The film was later shown as part of the Cannes Classics section of the 2013 Cannes Film Festival.
