= Saviano (surname) =

Saviano is an Italian surname. Notable people with the surname include:

- Angelo Saviano (born 1958), American politician
- Antonino Saviano (born 1984), Italian football player
- Josh Saviano (born 1976), American child actor and lawyer
- Nick Saviano (born 1956), American tennis player and coach
- Phil Saviano (1952–2021), American activist
- Roberto Saviano (born 1979), Italian writer, essayist, and screenwriter
- Steve Saviano (born 1981), American ice hockey player
- Tamara Saviano, American country music producer and author
