= Deanna Milvia Frosini =

Italian painter (1940–2021)

- Born: 2 February 1940; Pistoia, Italy
- Died: 15 May 2021 (aged 81); Rome, Italy
- Occupation: Painter

Deanna Milvia Frosini (2 February 1940 – 15 May 2021) was an Italian actress and painter.

== Biography ==
Frosini was born in Pistoia in 1940 and moved to Rome at the age of 20. A figurative painter, her works were characterized by their hyper-realistic qualities. From 1987 to 1989, she painted portraits of the first Italian Presidents, which were exhibited at the Chigi Palace. Her paintings were also displayed at the headquarters of the Italian Socialist Party. Additionally, she painted a portrait of former Prime Minister Bettino Craxi. In 2009, the Council of Ministers granted her a state-sponsored allowance via the Bacchelli law. Throughout her career, she collaborated with many leftist Italians, such as Alberto Moravia, Dacia Maraini, and Dario Bellezza.

In addition to her painting career, Frosini was also an actress. Her career was inspired by Pier Paolo Pasolini.

Deanna Milvia Frosini died in Rome on 15 May 2021 at the age of 81.

== Filmography ==
=== Actress ===
- The Seed of Man (1969)
- Under the Sign of Scorpio (1969)
- Wind from the East (1970)
- Lettera aperta a un giornale della sera (1970)

=== Set designer ===
- Private Vices, Public Pleasures (1976)
