= Les Créatures =

1966 fantasy drama film by Agnès Varda

- Theatrical release poster
- Directed by: Agnès Varda
- Written by: Agnès Varda
- Produced by: Mag Bodard
- Starring: Catherine Deneuve; Michel Piccoli
- Cinematography: Willy Kurant; William Lubtchansky
- Edited by: Janine Verneau
- Music by: Pierre Barbaud
- Production companies: Parc Film; Madeleine Films; Sandrew Ateljeerna
- Distributed by: Columbia Pictures
- Release dates: 3 September 1966 (France); 14 October 1966 (Sweden)
- Running time: 92 minutes
- Countries: France; Sweden
- Language: French
- Box office: 92,226 admissions (France)

Les Créatures (English: The Creatures) is a 1966 fantasy drama film written and directed by Agnès Varda that recounts a story of a couple who have just moved to a new town and been in a car accident. The wife, Mylène Piccoli, loses her voice in the accident and communicates through writing. The husband, Edgar Piccoli, is a science fiction writer working to produce his next book.

Les Créatures was an official selection of the 27th Venice International Film Festival, though it received mixed reviews. The film failed commercially.

Varda later recycled the leftover film stock from the film as the basis for her Ma cabane de l'échec (My Shack of Failure). Ma cabane was made from film stock directly from the distribution copy and rearranged to form the structure of a cabin.

== Plot ==
Les Créatures opens with Mylène and Edgar Piccoli driving down an empty road. Mylène expresses concern over how quickly Edgar is driving, but he refuses to slow down. Edgar defends his driving speed, stating that when he goes fast, his ideas also go fast. He describes how happy the two will be while living in a seaside house and going on long walks. Mylène agrees with Edgar, but asks him once more to slow down. Edgar does not, and shortly thereafter crashes into a tree.

We see that Edgar has survived the crash and is passing time watching the tide come in as he stands on an elevated platform located on the Passage du Gois, a road that gets flooded by the tide. A man drives past and offers Edgar a ride, saying that he will have to wait eight hours to leave otherwise. Edgar passes the ride up and instead watches the tide from the platform.

Edgar is seen beginning to write a book in scenes that are interspersed with his travels around his new town on the isle Noirmoutier. In these travels, he passes by a house with a stone tower on property that is marked "off limits." There is a solitary figure standing atop the tower, though the two do not interact. Edgar visits a store run by a woman and her daughter. Once Edgar leaves, the daughter remarks that he scared her, but the mother defends him, describing him as quiet but polite. While Edgar is in the outdoor market, Max and Pierre, two linen vendors, take particular note of him.

As Edgar drives home, Max and Pierre, who have blocked the road, stop him. The two proceed to fake a fight, and when Edgar intervenes, they cover him with a sheet rigged to rip. When it does, Max and Pierre insist that Edgar pays 50 francs for it. In the following scene, the vendors are seen talking to the shopkeeper and explaining that they feel something is amiss with Edgar.

Max and Pierre then harass Edgar at his home, while he is attempting to enjoy time with his pregnant wife Mylène, who has been rendered mute by the wreck. Edgar is able to drive the two off, but the next time he leaves the house, he finds a pile of sheets next to a dead cat.

He tries to find the owner of the dead cat, but it's not the shopkeeper's. He tries the local hotel, where he is accused of killing the cat. The film turns red, he accuses the hotel cook of killing the cat, as they serve cat when they're out of rabbit. He then beats those who accused him of killing the cat with its corpse. The manager of the hotel comes out to intervene and reassure Edgar that her cat is still alive. When Edgar goes to bury the cat, he discovers a strange metallic disc attached to it.

It is revealed that everything strange and out of the ordinary that has been transpiring recently is actually a story that Edgar is writing told through his eyes, though it is unclear exactly where the fiction of Edgar's story begins and the reality of his life as a writer ends. Edgar explains that a man who is more of an evil spirit than any kind of man or animal can control others through a remote device, though the batteries only last one hour. In Edgar's story, those who are being controlled are forced into actions that ruin their personal relationships. Each of the characters in Edgar's story are the residents of the town in which he and Mylène currently reside.

In his story Edgar becomes suspicious of his neighbor in the tower marked as off limits: Mr. Ducasse. Edgar enlists the linen vendors' help to break into Mr. Ducasse's house and investigate. Once inside, Edgar confronts Mr. Ducasse and forces him to explain the events that have been happening. Mr. Ducasse demonstrates that he can control people remotely, and does so by forcing one of the vendors, Pierre, to nearly jump out of a nearby window. At this point, Pierre decides he has seen enough and leaves. Mr. Ducasse tells Edgar that he will give him all the answers that he wants as long as Edgar can best him in a game that resembles a twisted version of chess. Edgar agrees to this plan.

In the game, miniature versions of the residents of the town are placed on a chessboard and driven to interact with one another. A nearby monitor displays a video of all the interactions the residents are having. Edgar must keep the relationships between the characters healthy while Mr. Ducasse attempts to drive them apart by controlling their minds for one minute at a time, during which time the screen turns red. The game proceeds with some relationships surviving and others breaking apart.

Edgar has seen enough, however, when Mr. Ducasse attempts to have the old man who owns the local hotel rape the shopkeeper's daughter, Suzon. Edgar proceeds to smash all the equipment and fight Mr. Ducasse. The fight proceeds to the top of the tower in the house, where Edgar forces Mr. Ducasse off the ledge to his death.

Thus ends the fictional story that Edgar has been writing. When Edgar next goes to town in an effort to call the local doctor to help Mylène through labor, though, he finds out that the real Mr. Ducasse had committed suicide by jumping from his tower's balcony and dying in the same manner as in Edgar's story.

Throughout the film, the line between what is fictional and what is really occurring to Edgar Piccoli is blurred. One is never quite sure when the film has stopped following Edgar the writer and begun following Edgar the subject of the novel. One thing that does become clear by the end of the film is that the metal discs are used to control the minds of the residents in the town, which is indicated by the film turning red. In these particular instances, the viewer knows that the scenes being watched are part of the novel, and not Piccoli's life as a writer.

== Cast ==
- Catherine Deneuve as Mylène
- Michel Piccoli as Edgar Piccoli
- Eva Dahlbeck as Michele Quellec
- Marie-France Mignal as Vivane Quellec
- Britta Pettersson as Lucie de Montyon
- Ursula Kubler as Vamp
- Jeanne Allard as Henriete
- Joëlle Gozzi as Suzon
- Bernard La Jarrige as Doctor Desteau
- Lucien Bodard as Monsieur Ducasse
- Pierre Danny as Max Picot
- Louis Falavigna as Pierre Roland
- Nino Castelnuovo as Jean Modet

== Production ==
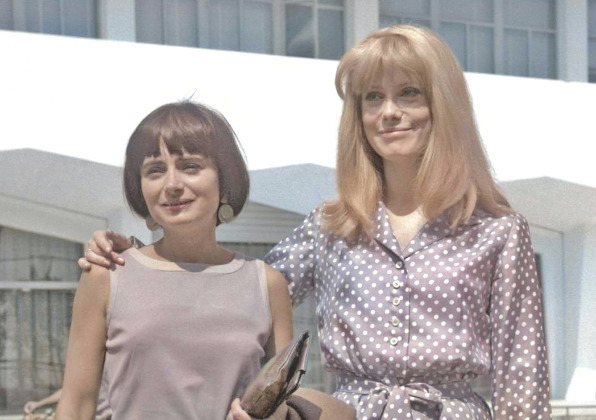
Director Agnès Varda with Catherine Deneuve (colourised)

According to Varda, she made Les Créatures in an attempt to show the messy nature of inspiration. She wanted to convey the way in which inspiration can come from all sorts of directions: the people one knows, the environment, and so on. All of these inspirational sources combine to create their own disorder, and one must recognize that disorder before it can be turned into a story. The disorder isn't going to arrange itself.

Les Créatures cast features Catherine Deneuve and Michel Piccoli in the leads. It was directed by Varda, and shot in Noirmoutier between 1 September and 15 October 1965. Claude Pignot designed the sets, with editing by Janine Verneau, music by Pierre Barbaud, and mixing by Jacques Maumont. Produced by Parc Films-Mag Bodard, Les Créatures was distributed by Ciné-Tamaris. The film is dedicated to Jacques Demy.

== Critical reception ==
Les Créatures received very mixed reviews upon its premier. Michel Cournot of Le Nouvel Observateur went so far as to call Les Créatures "a monster." Jean Narboni of Cahiers du Cinéma felt that Agnès Varda had thrown herself into a void with the film. Henry Chapier of Combat felt that Varda should be given a pass because "what author doesn't have the right to be wrong at least once."

Other contemporary critics disagreed, with Pierre Mazars of Le Figaro Littéraire saying that Les Créatures is presented with speed, humor and happiness, and that it shows the audience the birth of literary works through sleep and dreams. Samuel Lachize from L'Humanité treads the line between the two schools of thought, acknowledging that Les Créatures isn't Varda's best film, and it doesn't belong to any known genre, yet still inspires thought as it is a "troubling and curious film."

While contemporary critics were somewhat baffled by the film, U.S. critics have since received Les Créatures favorably. Roger Ebert gave it three stars out of four, calling it a "complex and nearly hypnotic study of the way fact is made into fiction." He said the film is a comparison between how we shape our lives and how a writer crafts his novel. "Our past is factual, but our future is flexible." Roger Greenspun of The New York Times lauded Varda for her efforts, but made the statement, "though cooking a stew with heavy ingredients, she produced mostly froth, and a little steam." Greenspun wrote that he hated the film upon his first viewing, but now realises that the film is so beautiful that its faults should be forgiven for all the small favours. James Travers from filmsdefrance.com praises Les Créatures' ability to fit in to the French Nouvelle Vague while maintaining feminist overtones, setting it apart from the rest of the movement.

== Ma cabane de l'échec ==
Agnès Varda recycled her failed film into a successful installation piece, Ma cabane de l'échec, or My Shack of Failure. The shacks made from recycled materials on the island of Noirmoutier, on which Les Créatures was filmed, inspired Varda's shack. To Varda, this is a "shack of a recycled movie." The shack was later renamed to La cabane du cinéma, or The Shack of Cinema.

This shack was a reinterpretation of cinema and an effort to revive Les Créatures and solidify its existence. Cabane also raised questions about perception of film in a plastic form versus a projected form. Varda claims that cinema is "light coming from somewhere captured by images more or less dark or colorful." To Varda, the shack itself is cinema, and when she is in the shack itself, "it feels like [she] live[s] in cinema."

Art critic Luc Vancheri concurs and continues, questioning how a series of segments from a film reel in the shape of a shack manages to maintain both the film itself, and projected cinema at the same time. He argues that since light is passing through the physical celluloid of the film stock, the film is still being projected and revealing its hidden images. The viewer of the shack has the choice of examining the images themselves, or the light that is being refracted and filtered through the celluloid.
