= The Last Woman =

- Directed by: Marco Ferreri
- Written by: Marco Ferreri; Rafael Azcona
- Starring: Gérard Depardieu; Ornella Muti
- Cinematography: Luciano Tovoli
- Music by: Philippe Sarde
- Release date: 1976
- Running time: 112 minutes
- Countries: France; Italy
- Language: French

The Last Woman (French: La Dernière femme, Italian: L'ultima donna, German: Die letzte Frau) is a 1976 French-Italian film directed by Marco Ferreri and starring Gérard Depardieu and Ornella Muti.

Depardieu was nominated for best actor for his role in the film at the César ceremony in 1977.

== Plot ==
Gérard is an engineer who is married to Gabrielle and has a nine-month-old son, for whom he cares deeply. When his feminist wife leaves him, he is left with custody of their son. To satisfy his romantic longings, Gerard embarks on an affair with Valérie, his son's daycare worker. However, Gabrielle fights for custody of the child, and when Gérard's affair with Valérie threatens his custody chances, Gérard responds by mutilating himself.

== Cast ==
- Ornella Muti : Valérie
- Gérard Depardieu : Gérard
- Michel Piccoli : Michel
- Renato Salvatori : René
- Giuliana Calandra : Benoîte
- Zouzou : Gabrielle
- Benjamin Labonnelie : Pierrot
- Nathalie Baye : The girl with cherries

== Production ==
The film was partially shot in an industrial zone in Saint-Avold (Moselle).

== Reception ==
On review aggregator website Rotten Tomatoes, the film holds an approval rating of 60% based on 5 reviews.
