= Giorgio Saviane =

Italian art critic and writer (1916–2000)

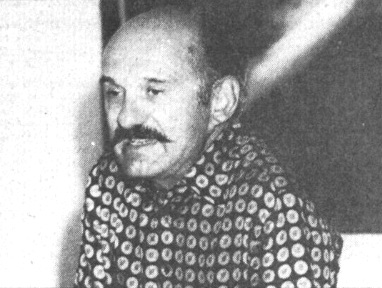

Giorgio Saviane (16 February 1916 – 18 December 2000) was an Italian author.

He received a Laurea in Giurisprudenza from University of Padua and then moved to Florence to practice as a lawyer. During his period in Florence, he started his career as a writer. From the very beginning, Saviane adopted an introspective style of writing that characterized all his future writings.

His best-known novels are Eutanasia di un amore and Il mare verticale.

== Books ==
- Le due folle, Guanda, Parma 1957; Rizzoli, Milano 1968; Mondadori, Milano 1982; Nuova Eri, Torino 1994
- L'inquisito, Lerici, Milano 1961; Rizzoli, Milano 1968; Mondadori, Milano 1982; Newton Compton, Roma 1994
- Il papa, Rizzoli, Milano 1963; Rusconi, Milano 1975; BUR, Milano 1980; Lucarini, Roma 1985; Newton Compton, Roma 1995
- Il passo lungo, Rizzoli, Milano 1965; Rusconi, Milano 1974; Mondadori, Milano 1981; Juvenilia, Bergamo 1987; Newton Compton, Roma 1995
- Le molte giustizie (a cura di), Ferro, Milano 1967
- Di profilo si nasce, Bietti, Milano 1973
- Il mare verticale, Rusconi, Milano 1973; BUR, Milano 1979; Mondadori, Milano 1987; Newton Compton, Roma 1994
- Eutanasia di un amore, Rizzoli, Milano 1976; BUR, Milano 1978; Mondadori, Milano 1993
- La donna di legno, Rizzoli, Milano 1979; BUR, Milano 1981
- Getsemani, Mondadori, Milano 1980
- Di profilo si nasce, Mondadori, Milano 1982
- Il tesoro dei Pellizzari, Mondadori Milano 1982
- Racconti, Liguori, Napoli 1983
- La casa dei Pellizzari, Mursia, Milano 1983
- Il mosca e l'agnello, SEI, Torino 1984
- Cenerentola a Urbino, Sansoni, Firenze 1985
- Il terzo aspetto, Mondadori, Milano 1987
- Diario intimo di un cattivo, Rizzoli, Milano 1989
- Il gatto Lorenzino e altri racconti, Mondadori, Milano 1989
- Il narratore e i suoi testi, La nuova Italia, Firenze 1990 (antologia - Premio Pirandello per la narrativa)
- L'automobile a due ruote, Guida, Napoli 1990 (con L'attrice di Michela Fassa)
- Una vergogna civile, Rizzoli, Milano 1991
- In attesa di lei, Mondadori, Milano 1992
- Voglio parlare con Dio, Mondadori, Milano 1996
- Giacomo Leopardi e l'amore (a cura di), Ibiskos, Empoli 1998 (su Giacomo Leopardi)
- Barbetta e l'agnello, Cartedit, Monte Cremasco 1998
