= Marco Ferreri =

Italian film director, screenwriter and actor (1928–1997)

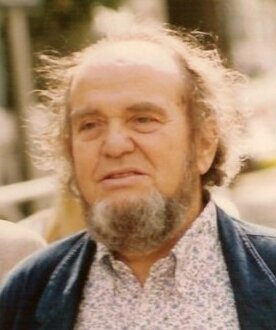
- Ferreri at Cannes Film Festival in 1991
- Born: 11 May 1928; Milan, Lombardy, Italy
- Died: 9 May 1997 (aged 68); Paris, France
- Occupations: Director; screenwriter; actor
- Spouse: Jacqueline Lamothe

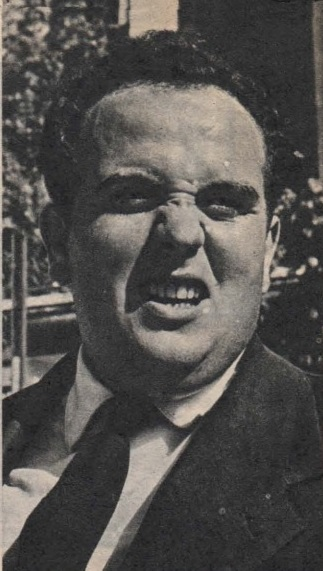
Ferreri in 1953

Marco Ferreri (11 May 1928 – 9 May 1997) was an Italian film director, screenwriter and actor, who began his career in the 1950s directing three films in Spain, followed by 24 Italian films before his death in 1997. He is considered one of the greatest European cinematic provocateurs of his time and had a constant presence in prestigious festival circuit - including eight films in competition in Cannes Film Festival and a Golden Bear win in 1991 Berlin Film Festival. Three of his films are among 100 films selected for preservation for their significant contribution to Italian cinema.

== Biography ==
He was born in Milan. His best known film is La Grande Bouffe (The Big Feast, 1973). It starred Marcello Mastroianni, Michel Piccoli, Philippe Noiret and Ugo Tognazzi.

He was a socialist and an atheist.

He died in Paris of a heart attack. Upon his death, Gilles Jacob, artistic director of the Cannes International Film Festival, said: "The Italian cinema has lost one of its most original artists, one of its most personal authors (...) No one was more demanding nor more allegorical than he in showing the state of crisis of contemporary man."

== Awards ==
His 1979 film Chiedo asilo (starring Roberto Benigni) won him the Silver Bear - Special Jury Prize at the 30th Berlin International Film Festival. In 1991, his film La casa del sorriso won the Golden Bear at the 41st Berlin International Film Festival. Two years later, his film Diario di un vizio was nominated for the Golden Bear at the 43rd Berlin International Film Festival.

== Partial filmography ==
=== Director ===
- El pisito (1958)
- Los chicos (1959)
- El cochecito (1960)
- Una storia moderna: l’ape regina (The Conjugal Bed, 1963)
- La donna scimmia (The Ape Woman, 1964)
- L'uomo dei cinque palloni (1965)
- L'Harem (1967)
- The Seed of Man (1969)
- Dillinger è morto (Dillinger Is Dead, 1969)
- The Audience (1972)
- Liza (in French; Italian version title La cagna, 1972)
- La Grande Bouffe (in French and Italian; Italian dubbed version title La grande abbuffata, 1973)
- Touche pas à la femme blanche (in French; Italian dubbed version title Non toccare la donna bianca, released in English as Don't Touch The White Woman!, 1974)
- La Dernière femme (in French; Italian dubbed version title L'ultima donna, international version title The Last Woman, 1976)
- Ciao maschio (in Italian and French, French dubbed version title Rêve du singe, English version title Bye Bye Monkey, 1978)
- Chiedo asilo (1979) (English dubbed version title Seeking Asylum, 1980)
- Tales of Ordinary Madness (in English; Italian dubbed version title Storie di ordinaria follia, 1981)
- Storia di Piera (The Story of Piera, 1983)
- Il futuro è donna (The Future Is Woman, 1984)
- I Love You (1986)
- Ya bon les blancs (Italian dubbed version title Come sono buoni i bianchi!, 1988)
- La banquette (Italian title: Il banchetto di Platone, 1989)
- La casa del sorriso (The House of Smiles, 1991)
- La carne (also screenwriter) (1991)
- Diario di un vizio (Diary of a Maniac, 1993)
- Faictz ce que vouldras (1994)
- Nitrato d'argento (1996)

=== Screenwriter ===
- Mafioso (1962)
- Dillinger Is Dead (Dillinger è morto, 1969)
- Non toccare la donna bianca (1973)
- Ciao maschio (1977)
- Chiedo asilo (1980)
- Storia di Piera (1983)
- Il futuro è donna (1984)
- I Love You (1985)

=== Actor ===
- The Beach (1954)
- Women and Soldiers (1954)
- Casanova 70 (1967)
- The Seventh Floor (1967)
- Pigsty (1969)
- So Long Gulliver (1970)
- Non toccare la donna bianca (1973)
- An Almost Perfect Affair (1979) (uncredited)

== See also ==
- Spanish cinema
