= Mario Vulpiani =

Italian cinematographer and documentarist (born 1927)

- Born: 15 February 1927 (age 99); Rome, Italy
- Occupation: Cinematographer

Mario Vulpiani (born 15 February 1927) is an Italian cinematographer and documentarist.

== Life and career ==
Born in Rome, Vulpiani began his career as assistant of the operator Enrico Chroscisky. In the fifties he worked mainly in the field of documentary films, also working as a director. In 1965, with a segment of the anthology film Marcia nuziale, Vulpiani started a critically appreciated collaboration with the director Marco Ferreri that includes the celebrated cult films Dillinger Is Dead and La Grande Bouffe. In the late sixties he collaborated with the postmodern painter Mario Schifano in his three experimental films. In the seventies he worked, among others, with Valentino Orsini, Damiano Damiani, Andrea Barzini, Mario Monicelli and Carlo Lizzani. Starting from the eighties Vulpiani focused into less ambitious works, except for several collaborations with Gabriele Lavia.
