= Marcello Mastroianni =

Italian actor (1924–1996)

Marcello Mastroianni OMRI
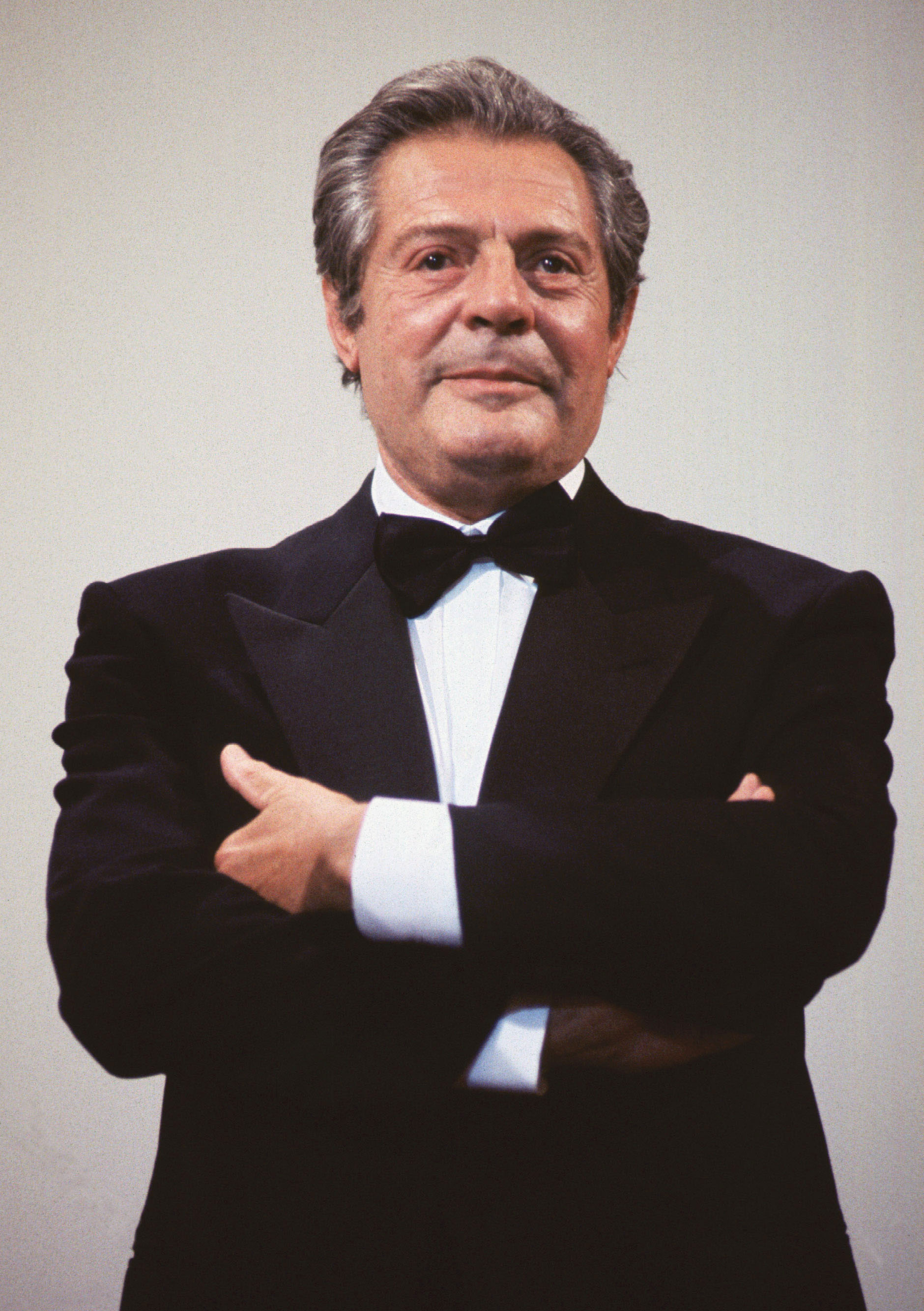
- Mastroianni in 1990
- Born: Marcello Vincenzo Domenico Mastroianni; 26 September 1924; Fontana Liri, Lazio, Kingdom of Italy
- Died: 19 December 1996 (aged 72); Saint-Germain-des-Prés, Paris, France
- Occupation: Actor
- Years active: 1938–1996
- Spouse: Flora Carabella (m. 1950; sep. 1964)
- Partner(s): Faye Dunaway (1968–1970); Catherine Deneuve (1970–1974); Anna Maria Tatò (1976–1996)
- Children: Barbara and Chiara
- Relatives: Ruggero Mastroianni (brother)

Marcello Vincenzo Domenico Mastroianni (Note: Pronunciation: /mɑːrˈtʃɛloʊ ˌmæstroʊˈjɑːni, - ˌmɑːs-, -ˈjæn-, - ˌmæstrɔɪˈɑːni, - ˌmɑːs-/ mar-CHEL-oh MA(H)ST-roh-YA(H)N-ee, - MA(H)ST-roy-AH-nee, Italian: [marˈtʃɛllo mastroˈjanni].) (26 September 1924 – 19 December 1996) was an Italian actor. He is generally regarded as one of Italy's most iconic male performers of the 20th century. He played leading roles for many of the country's top directors, in a career spanning 147 films between 1939 and 1996, garnering many international honours including two BAFTA Awards, two Cannes Film Festival Awards for Best Actor, two Volpi Cups, two Golden Globes, and three Academy Award nominations.

Born in Fontana Liri (province of Frosinone, Lazio, IT) and raised in Turin and Rome, Mastroianni made his film debut in 1939 at the age of 14, but did not seriously pursue acting until the 1950s, when he made his critical and commercial breakthrough in the caper comedy Big Deal on Madonna Street (Italian I soliti ignoti, 1959). He became an international celebrity through his collaborations with director Federico Fellini, first as a disillusioned tabloid columnist in La Dolce Vita (1960), then as a creatively-stifled filmmaker in 8½ (1963). Excelling in both dramatic and comedic roles, he formed a notable on-screen duo with actress and sex symbol Sophia Loren, co-starring with her in eleven films between 1954 and 1994.

Despite international acclaim, Mastroianni largely shunned Hollywood, and remained a quintessentially Italian thespian for the majority of his career. He was the first actor to receive an Academy Award nomination for a non-English language performance, and was nominated for Best Actor three times – Divorce Italian Style (Italian Divorzio all'italiana, 1961), A Special Day (Una giornata particolare, 1977), and Dark Eyes (Italia Oci Ciornie, 1987). He was one of only three actors, the others being Jack Lemmon and Dean Stockwell, to win the prestigious Cannes Film Festival Award for Best Actor twice. Mastroianni's contributions to Italian art and culture saw him receive multiple civil honours, including the Order of Merit of the Italian Republic, the highest-ranking knighthood of the country.

== Early life ==
Mastroianni was born in Fontana Liri, a small village in the Apennines within the Lazio province of Frosinone, and grew up in Turin and Rome. He was the son of Ida Irolle and Ottone Mastroianni. Both of his parents were from the nearby town of Arpino. His father ran a carpentry shop. Mastroianni was a nephew of sculptor Umberto Mastroianni. During World War II, after the division into Axis and Allied Italy, he was interned in a loosely guarded German prison camp, from which he escaped to hide in Venice.

His brother Ruggero Mastroianni was a film editor who worked on some of Marcello's films (City of Women, Ginger and Fred), and appeared alongside Marcello in Scipio the African, a spoof of the once popular Sword and Sandal film genre released in 1971.

== Acting career ==
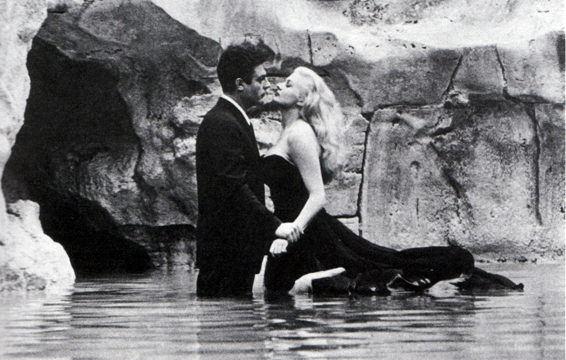
Mastroianni and Anita Ekberg in the Trevi Fountain, Rome, during the shooting of La Dolce Vita (1960)

Mastroianni made his screen debut as an uncredited extra in Marionette (1939) when he was fourteen and made intermittent minor film appearances until landing his first big role in Atto d'accusa (1951). Within a decade he became a major international celebrity, starring in Big Deal on Madonna Street (1958) and in Federico Fellini's La Dolce Vita (1960), playing a disillusioned and self-loathing tabloid columnist who spends his days and nights exploring Rome's decadent high society. Mastroianni followed La Dolce Vita with Fellini's 8½ (1963), in which he created another signature role, that of a film director who, amidst self-doubt and troubled love affairs, finds himself in a creative block while making a film.

His other prominent films include Days of Love (1954) with Marina Vlady; La Notte (1961) with Jeanne Moreau; Too Bad She's Bad (1954), Lucky to Be a Woman (1956), Yesterday, Today and Tomorrow (1963), Marriage Italian Style (1964), Sunflower (1970), The Priest's Wife (1971), A Special Day (1977) and Robert Altman's Prêt-à-Porter (1994) – all co-starring Sophia Loren; Luchino Visconti's White Nights (1957); Pietro Germi's Divorce Italian Style (1961); Family Diary (1962) with Jacques Perrin; A Very Private Affair (1962) with Brigitte Bardot; Mario Monicelli's Casanova 70 (1965); Diamonds for Breakfast (1968) with Rita Tushingham; The Pizza Triangle (1970) with Monica Vitti; Massacre in Rome (1973) with Richard Burton; The Sunday Woman (1975) with Jacqueline Bisset; Stay As You Are (1978) with Nastassja Kinski; Fellini's City of Women (1980) and Ginger and Fred (1986); Marco Bellocchio's Henry IV (1984); Macaroni (1985) with Jack Lemmon; Nikita Mikhalkov's Dark Eyes (1987) with Marthe Keller; Giuseppe Tornatore's Everybody's Fine (1990); Used People (1992) with Shirley MacLaine; and Agnès Varda's One Hundred and One Nights (1995).

He was nominated for the Academy Award for Best Actor three times: for Divorce Italian Style, A Special Day and Dark Eyes. Mastroianni, Dean Stockwell and Jack Lemmon are the only actors to have been twice awarded the Best Actor at the Cannes Film Festival. Mastroianni won it in 1970 for The Pizza Triangle and in 1987 for Dark Eyes.

Mastroianni starred alongside his daughter, Chiara Mastroianni, in Raúl Ruiz's Three Lives and Only One Death in 1996. For this performance he won the Silver Wave Award at the Ft. Lauderdale International Film Festival. His final film, Voyage to the Beginning of the World (1997), was released posthumously.

== Personal life ==
Mastroianni married Flora Carabella on 12 August 1950. They had one daughter together, Barbara (1951–2018), and informally separated in 1964 because of his affairs with younger women. Mastroianni's first serious relationship after the separation was with Faye Dunaway, his co-star in A Place for Lovers (1968). Dunaway wanted to marry and have children, but Mastroianni, a Catholic, refused to divorce Carabella. In 1970, after more than two years of waiting for Mastroianni to change his mind, Dunaway left him. Mastroianni told a reporter for People magazine in 1987 that he never got over the breakup. "She was the woman I loved the most," he said. "I'll always be sorry to have lost her. I was whole with her for the first time in my life." In her 1995 autobiography Looking for Gatsby, Dunaway wrote: "I wish to this day it had worked out." In the 2024 documentary Faye, she described him as the love of her life.

After the break up with Dunaway, Mastroianni began a relationship with French actress Catherine Deneuve, who was nearly 20 years his junior. They lived together for four years during the 1970s and had a daughter, Chiara Mastroianni (born 28 May 1972). During their time together the couple made four films: It Only Happens to Others (1971), La cagna (1972), A Slightly Pregnant Man (1973) and Don't Touch the White Woman! (1974). After Mastroianni and Deneuve broke up, his estranged wife Carabella reportedly offered to adopt Chiara because her parents' busy careers kept them away from her so often. Deneuve adamantly refused.

Mastroianni's other lovers reportedly included actresses Anouk Aimée, Carole Mallory, Claudia Cardinale, Lauren Hutton and Ursula Andress. By 1976, he became involved with Anna Maria Tatò, an author and filmmaker. They remained together until his death in 1996.

He was made a Knight Grand Cross of the Order of Merit of the Italian Republic in 1994.

== Death ==
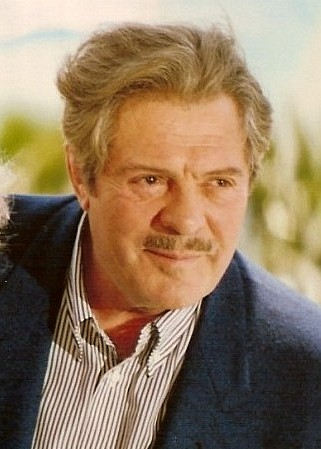
Mastroianni in 1991

Mastroianni died of pancreatic cancer on 19 December 1996 at the age of 72. Both of his daughters, as well as Deneuve and Tatò, were at his bedside. The Trevi Fountain in Rome, associated with his role in Fellini's La Dolce Vita, was symbolically turned off and draped in black as a tribute. A funeral was held at the Church of St. Sulpice in Saint-Germain-des-Prés in Paris 20 December 1996 before his remains were transferred to Rome where a second ceremony took place at the city hall on 22 December before he was interred in his family vault in Verano Cemetery.

At the 1997 Venice Film Festival, Chiara, Carabella, and Deneuve tried to block the screening of Tatò's four-hour documentary, Marcello Mastroianni: I Remember. The festival refused and the film was shown. The three women reportedly tried to do the same thing at Cannes. Tatò said Mastroianni had willed her all rights to his image.

== Filmography ==
=== Film ===
Year	Title	Role	Notes
1939	Marionette	Extra	Uncredited
1942	Love Story	Extra	
1944	The Children Are Watching Us	Extra	Uncredited
1948	Les Misérables	Bit part	Uncredited
1949	Vertigine d'amore	Bit part	
1949	Twenty Years	Bit part	
1950	Sunday in August	Ercole Nardi	
1950	Against the Law	Marcello Curti	
1950	A Dog's Life	Carlo Danesi	
1950	The Accusation	Renato La Torre	
1950	Hearts at Sea	Massimo Falchetti	
1951	A Tale of Five Cities	Aldo Mazzetti	
1951	Last Meeting	Michele Bonesi (voice)	Dubbed Jean-Pierre Aumont
1951	Paris Is Always Paris	Marcello Venturi	
1952	Three Girls from Rome	Marcello Sartori	
1952	The Eternal Chain	Walter Ronchi	
1952	Tragic Return	Marco	
1952	Barefoot Savage	Carlo Santori	
1952	Black Feathers	Pietro Cossuti	
1952	Sunday Heroes	Carlo Vagnetti	
1952	The Mute of Portici	Extra	Uncredited
1953	Lulù	Soletti	
1953	Il viale della speranza	Mario	
1953	It's Never Too Late	Riccardo	
1953	Eager to Live	Daniele Massa	
1953	La valigia dei sogni		
1954	Chronicle of Poor Lovers	Ugo	
1954	A Slice of Life	Maria's husband	Segment: "Il pupo"
1954	Schiava del peccato	Giulio Franchi	
1954	Days of Love	Pasquale Droppio	
1954	Casa Ricordi	Gaetano Donizetti	
1954	Too Bad She's Bad	Paolo	
1954	The Island Princess	Hernán	
1955	Tom Toms of Mayumba	Alessandrini	
1955	The Miller's Beautiful Wife	Luca	
1956	Lucky to Be a Woman	Corrado Betti	
1956	The Bigamist	Mario De Santis	
1957	Fathers and Sons	Cesare	
1957	Sand, Love and Salt	Piero	
1957	The Most Wonderful Moment	Pietro Valeri	
1957	White Nights	Mario	
1957	Doctor and the Healer	Dr. Francesco Marchetti	
1958	Piece of the Sky	Severino Balestra	
1958	Big Deal on Madonna Street	Tiberio	
1958	Girls for the Summer	Marcello Mazzoni	
1958	Love and Troubles	Franco	
1959	The Law	Enrico Tosso	
1959	My Wife's Enemy	Marco Tornabuoni	
1959	Everyone's in Love	Giovanni	
1959	Ferdinando I, re di Napoli	Gennarino	
1960	La Dolce Vita	Marcello Rubini	
1960	Il bell'Antonio	Antonio Magnano	
1960	Adua and Friends	Piero Salvagni	
1961	La notte	Giovanni Pontano	
1961	The Assassin	Alfredo Martelli	
1961	Ghosts of Rome	Reginaldo di Roviano / Federico di Roviano / Gino	
1961	Divorce, Italian Style	Ferdinando "Fefè" Cefalù	
1962	A Very Private Affair	Fabio Rinaldi	
1962	Family Diary	Enrico	
1963	8½	Guido Anselmi	
1963	The Organizer	Prof. Sinigaglia	
1963	Yesterday, Today and Tomorrow	Carmine Sbaratti	
1964	Marriage Italian-Style	Domenico Soriano	
1965	Casanova 70	Major Colombetti	
1965	The 10th Victim	Marcello Poletti	
1965	The Man, the Woman and the Money	Mario / Michele Profili / Mario Gasparri	
1966	Me, Me, Me... and the Others	Peppino Marassi	
1966	Shoot Loud, Louder... I Don't Understand	Alberto Saporito	
1967	The Stranger	Arthur Meursault	
1967	Ghosts – Italian Style	The Ghost	Uncredited
1968	Break Up	Mario Fuggetta	
1968	A Place for Lovers	Valerio	
1968	Diamonds for Breakfast	Grand Duke Nikolay Vladimirovich Godunov	
1970	The Pizza Triangle	Oreste Nardi	
1970	Sunflower	Antonio	
1970	Leo the Last	Leo	
1970	The Voyeur	Sandro	
1970	The Priest's Wife	Don Mario	
1971	Scipio the African	Scipio Africanus	
1971	It Only Happens to Others	Marcello	
1971	My Name Is Rocco Papaleo	Rocco Papaleo	
1972	Liza	Giorgio	
1972	What?	Alex	
1972	Roma	Himself	Cameo appearance
1973	Dirty Weekend	Giulio Borsi	
1973	La Grande Bouffe	Marcello	
1973	A Slightly Pregnant Man	Marco Mazetti	
1973	Massacre in Rome	Father Pietro Antonelli	
1973	Hail the Artist	Nicolas Montei	
1974	Don't Touch the White Woman!	George A. Custer	
1974	Allonsanfàn	Fulvio Imbriani	
1974	We All Loved Each Other So Much	Himself	
1975	Sex Pot	Charlie Colletto	
1975	Down the Ancient Staircase	Professor Bonaccorsi	
1975	The Divine Nymph	Michele Barra	
1975	The Sunday Woman	Commissioner Salvatore Santamaria	
1976	Todo modo	Don Gaetano	
1976	Goodnight, Ladies and Gentlemen	Paolo T. Fiume	
1976	Lunatics and Lovers	Marchese Luca Maria	
1977	A Special Day	Gabriele	
1977	Wifemistress	Luigi De Angelis	
1977	Double Murder	Bruno Baldassarre	
1978	Bye Bye Monkey	Luigi Nocello	
1978	Stay As You Are	Giulio Marengo	
1978	Blood Feud	Rosario Maria Spallone	
1979	Traffic Jam	Marco Montefoschi	
1979	Neapolitan Mystery	Raffaele Capece	
1980	La terrazza	Luigi	
1980	City of Women	Snàporaz	
1981	Fantasma d'amore	Nino Monti	
1981	The Skin	Curzio Malaparte	
1982	That Night in Varennes	Casanova, Chevalier de Seingalt	
1982	Beyond the Door	Enrico Sommi	
1982	The Last Horror Film	Himself	Cameo appearance
1983	The Story of Piera	Lorenzo	
1983	Gabriela, Cravo e Canela	Nacib	
1983	The General of the Dead Army	General Ariosto	
1984	Henry IV	Henry IV	
1985	The Two Lives of Mattia Pascal	Mattia Pascal	
1985	Macaroni	Antonio Jasiello	
1985	Big Deal After 20 Years	Tiberio	
1986	Ginger and Fred	Pippo Botticella (Fred)	
1986	The Beekeeper	Spyros	
1987	Dark Eyes	Romano	
1987	Intervista	Himself	
1988	Miss Arizona	Rozsnyai Sándor	
1989	Splendor	Jordan	
1989	What Time Is It?	Marcello	
1990	Everybody's Fine	Matteo Scuro	
1990	Towards Evening	Prof. Bruschi	
1991	The Suspended Step of the Stork	Missing Politician	
1991	The Children Thief	Bigua	
1991	A Fine Romance	Cesareo Grimaldi	
1992	Used People	Joe Meledandri	
1993	I Don't Want to Talk About It	Ludovico D'Andrea	
1993	1, 2, 3, Sun	Constantin Laspada	
1994	Prêt-à-Porter	Sergei (Sergio)	
1994	The True Life of Antonio H.	Himself	
1995	A Hundred and One Nights	The Italian Friend	
1995	According to Pereira	Pereira	
1995	Beyond the Clouds	The Man of All Vices	
1996	Three Lives and Only One Death	Mateo Strano / Georges Vickers / Butler / Luc Allamand	
1997	Voyage to the Beginning of the World	Manoel	Released posthumously

=== Television ===
Year	Title	Role	Notes
1966	The Poppy Is Also a Flower	Inspector Mosca	Made-for-TV movie
1971	Rowan & Martin's Laugh-In	Himself (guest)	2 episodes
1972	1870	Augusto Parenti	Made-for-TV movie
1978	Le mani sporche	Hoederer	Miniseries
1988	Piazza Navona	Himself	6 episodes
1994	A che punto è la notte	Salvatore Santamaria	Miniseries

== Awards and nominations ==
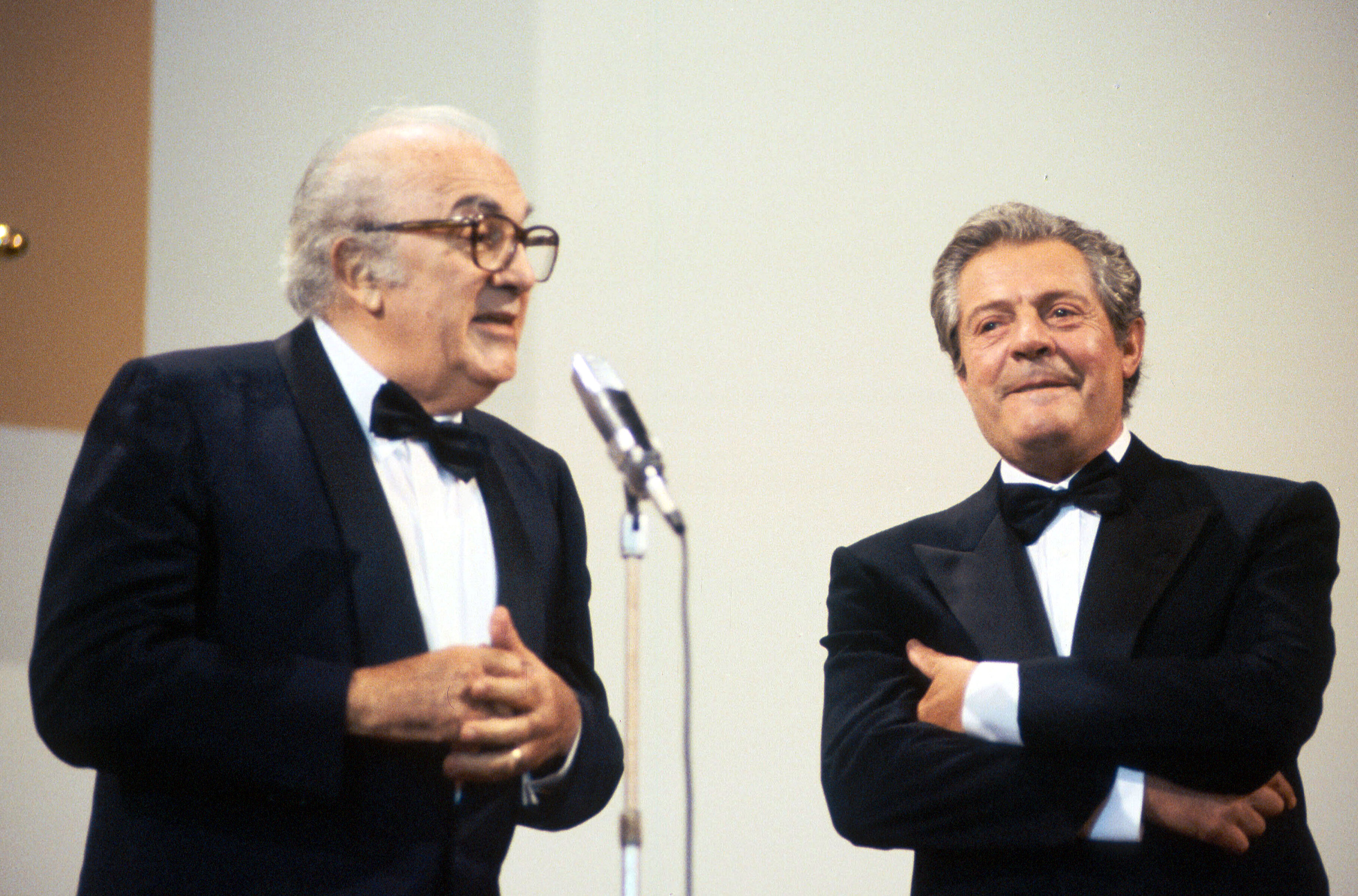
Federico Fellini and Mastroianni at the 1990 Venice Film Festival

=== Wins ===
- David di Donatello
  - Best Actor
    - 1964 Yesterday, Today and Tomorrow
    - 1965 Marriage Italian Style
    - 1986 Ginger and Fred
    - 1988 Dark Eyes
    - 1995 According to Pereira
  - 1983 Carrer David
  - 1995 Special David
  - 1997 Carrer David (posthumous)
- Nastro d'Argento
  - Best Actor
    - 1955 Days of Love
    - 1958 White Nights
    - 1961 La Dolce Vita
    - 1962 Divorce Italian Style
    - 1986 Ginger and Fred
    - 1988 Dark Eyes
    - 1991 Towards Evening
  - 1997 Special Nastro d'Argento (posthumous)
- Venice Film Festival
  - Golden Lion
    - 1990 Honorary Award
  - Best Actor
    - 1989 What Time Is It?
  - Best Supporting Actor
    - 1993 1, 2, 3, Sun
- Cairo International Film Festival
  - Career achievement award
    - 1990 Honorary Award
- Cannes Film Festival
  - Best Actor
    - 1970 The Pizza Triangle
    - 1988 Dark Eyes
- BAFTA Award
  - Best Foreign Actor
    - 1964 Divorce Italian Style
    - 1965 Yesterday, Today and Tomorrow
- Golden Globe Award
  - Golden Globe Award for Best Actor – Motion Picture Musical or Comedy
    - 1963 Divorce Italian Style
- César Award
  - 1993 Honorary César

=== Nominations ===
- Academy Award
  - Academy Award for Best Actor
    - 1963 Divorce Italian Style
    - 1978 A Special Day
    - 1988 Dark Eyes

== Honours and achievements ==
=== Orders ===
- 3rd Class / Commander: Cavaliere Ordine al Merito della Repubblica Italiana: 1967
- 2nd Class / Grand Officer: Grande Ufficiale Ordine al Merito della Repubblica Italiana: 1987
- 1st Class / Knight Grand Cross: Cavaliere di Gran Croce Ordine al Merito della Repubblica Italiana: 1994

== See also ==
- List of Academy Award winners and nominees from Italy
- List of actors with Academy Award nominations
- List of actors with more than one Academy Award nomination in the acting categories
