= Alumni of the Accademia Nazionale di Arte Drammatica Silvio D'Amico =

Specializing in the field of drama, with particular attention to the drama of its national heritage, the Accademia Nazionale di Arte Drammatica Silvio D'Amico has played a key role in the Italian film and theater scene and is currently headed by Professor Luigi Maria Musati. It has prepared artists such as Margherita Buy, Vittorio Gassman, Luigi Lo Cascio, Anna Magnani, Nino Manfredi, and Monica Vitti. Other former alumni include Antoniano, Mino Bellei, Carmelo Bene, Dirk van den Berg, Giuliana Berlinguer, Alessio Boni, Alberto Bonucci, Giulio Bosetti, Renato De Carmine, Ennio Fantastichini, Gabriele Ferzetti (expelled), Scilla Gabel, Domiziana Giordano, Michele Placido, Luca Ronconi, Gian Maria Volonté and Lina Wertmüller.

== 1930s ==
Among the first pupils in the 1930s were: Gianni Cajafa, Miranda Campa, Leonardo Cortese, Margherita Ligios, Aroldo Tieri, Nerina Bianchi, Ave Ninchi, Antonio Battistella, Ada Cannavò, Antonio Crast, Pietro Tordi, Otello Cazzola, Giusi Raspani Dandolo, Giovanna Galletti, Beatrice Mancini, Carlo Bagno, Anna Caravaggi, Gino Mavara, Marcello Moretti, Vanna Polverosi, Arturo Zanini, Manlio Busoni, Ubaldo Lay, Vittorio Caprioli, Elena Da Venezia, Raffaele Giangrande, Franco Pucci, Adriana de Roberto, Giampaolo Rossi, Gianni Santuccio, Alessandro Brissoni, Ugo Fasano, Luigi Giachino, Masserano Taricco, Ettore Giannini, Giuliano Tomei, Rate Furlan, Luciano Mondolfo, Fede Arnaud, Wanda Fabro, Gastone Da Venezia and Eugenio Salussolia.

== 1940s ==
Notable alumni in the 1940s include: Alberto Bonucci, Carlo Mazzarella, Antonio Pierfederici, Carla Pini, Silverio Blasi, Adolfo Celi, Marisa Chierichetti, Salvatore Corsitto, Lia Curci, Vittorio Gassman, Anna Maestri, Vittoria Martello, Goliarda Sapienza, Edda Albertini, Silverio Blasi, Ignazio Bosic, Anna Brandimarte, Marcello Fondato, Lea Padovani, Adriana Parrella, Maria Teresa Albani, Giorgio De Lullo, Corrado Gaipa, Ettore Gaipa, Renato Lupi, Gianni Marchesini, Marina Bonfigli, Tino Buazzelli, Giuliana Corbellini, Amalia D'Alessio, Renato De Carmine, Renzo Giovampietro, Mario Lombardini, Nino Manfredi, Paolo Panelli, Zora Piazza, Giancarlo Sbragia, Manlio Vergoz, Anna Maria Alegiani, Flora Carabella, Rossella Falk, Raoul Grassilli, Adriana Innocenti, Stefania Mastrocinque, Elio Pandolfi, Gigliola Rosmino, Mario Scaccia, Bice Valori, Stella Aliquò, Gabriella Genta, Oreste Lionello, Fulvia Mammi, Adriano Micantoni, Fernando Caiati, Carlo Giuffrè, Grazia Marescalchi, Diego Michelotti, Giorgio Piazza, Gianrico Tedeschi, Mila Vannucci, Margherita Autuori, Mario Chiocchio, Anna Miserocchi, Francesco Mulè, Edda Valente, Niccolò Accursio Di Leo, Vito Pandolfi, Alberto D'Aversa, Mario Landi, Giuseppe Zoppi, Luciano Salce, Luigi Squarzina, Luciano Lucignani, Alfredo Zennaro, Flaminio Bollini, Mario Ferrero, Francesco Pavolini, Franco Giacobini and Andrea Camilleri.

== 1950s ==
Notable alumni in the 1950s include: Edmonda Aldini, Mario Azzella, Leonardo Bragaglia, Ornella Cappellini, Mico Cundari, Franco Graziosi, Glauco Mauri, Rosalba Oletta, Alessandro Sperlì, Laura Tiberti, Luigi Vannucchi, Italo Alfaro, Carlo Alighiero, Narcisa Bonati, Mauro Carbonoli, Sandra Canalis, Monica Vitti, Bruna Corrà, Vincenzo De Toma, Ennio Groggia, Davide Montemurri, Esmeralda Ruspoli, Anna Maria Torniai, Warner Bentivegna, Elena Cotta, Piero De Santis, Vera Gherarducci, Ileana Ghione, Renato Mainardi, Mario Maranzana, Quinto Parmeggiani, Luca Ronconi, Silvia Monelli, Enrico Osterman, Silvio Spaccesi, Francesca Benedetti, Lucia Catullo, Vera Gambacciani, Elsa Ghiberti, Paolo Giuranna, Sergio Graziani, Raffaele Meloni, Anna Menichetti, Franco Mezzera, Gastone Moschin, Alessandro Ninchi, Marisa Omodei, Marisa Quattrini, Anna Maria Trombello, Gabriella Andreini, Ezio Cristini, Massimo De Francovich, Remo Foglino, Bianca Galvan, Anna Garatti, Sergio Graziani, Maurizio Gueli, Enrico Lucherini, Luciano Melani, Renato Mori, Gianfranco Ombuen, Orazio Orlando, Paola Piccinato, Ferruccio Soleri, Francesca Benedetti, Giancarlo Bonuglia, Angela Cavo, Manlio De Angelis, Wilma D'Eusebio, Giancarlo Dettori, Gianna Giachetti, Cristina Mascitelli, Ilaria Occhini, Glauco Onorato, Marcello Tusco, Adriana Vianello, Gian Maria Volonté, Dante Biagioni, Stelio Candelli, Angela Cardile, Alba Cardilli, Attilio Cucari, Solvejg D'Assunta, Antonietta Lambroni, Mario Licalsi, Umberto Orsini, Manuela Andrei, Mino Bellei, Vera Besusso, Donato Castellaneta, Mario Erpichini, Giuliana Lojodice, Arnaldo Ninchi, Eros Pagni, Giacomo Piperno, Antonio Salines, Carmen Scarpitta, Lily Tirinnanzi, Silvio Anselmo, Carmelo Bene, Giuseppe Colizzi, Piero Faggioni, Gianni Garko, Roberto Herlitzka, Walter Maestosi, Marcello Mandò, Paola Mannoni, Flavia Milanta, Edoardo Torricella, Marisa Bartoli, Paolo Bonacelli, Euro Bulfoni, Renato Campese, Emilio Cappuccio, Alberto Cevenini, Rita Cimara, Antonio Colonnello, Claudia Giannotti, Isabella Guidotti, Nicoletta Languasco, Ugo Pagliai, Alida Chelli, Maria Teresa Bax, Pietro Biondi, Roberto Bisacco, Ezio Busso, Michele Kalamera, Claudio Camaso, Carlo Cecchi, Bruno Cirino, Carla Comaschi, Rita Di Lernia, Sergio Di Stefano, Giuseppe Mannajuolo, Paila Pavese, Salvatore Puntillo, Mariano Rigillo, Piera Vidale, Giancarlo Zanetti, Giorgio Bandini, Edmo Fenoglio, Giacomo Vaccari, Giacomo Colli, Mario Missiroli, Marcello Aliprandi, Raffaele Orlando, Sandro Sequi and Giorgio Pressburger.

== 1960s ==
Notable alumni in the 1960s include: Lorenza Biella, Mario Bussolino, Adolfo Lastretti, Claudio Meldolesi, Raffaella Panichi, Mario Valgoi, Pierluigi Aprà, Daniela Nobili, Annarita Bartolomei, Lina Bernardi, Fiorella Buffa, Lino Capolicchio, Pierangelo Civera, Roberto Del Giudice, Giorgio Favretto, Pieraldo Ferrante, Mariella Furgiuele, Giancarlo Giannini, Maddalena Gillia, Magda Mercatali, Anna Maria Polani, Renato Romano, Pier Luigi Zollo, Marcello Aste, Bruno Alecci, Simona Caucia, Luigi Diberti, Vittorio Di Prima, Clara Droetto, Nelide Giammarco, Luigi La Monica, Ugo Maria Morosi, Cecilia Polizzi, Claudia Ricatti, Carlo Valli, Ada Maria Serra Zanetti, Roberto Bonanni, Mario Brusa, Shara Di Nepi, Alessandro Jovino, Gabriele Lavia, Natalino Libralesso, Marzio Margine, Viviana Polic, Franco Agostini, Dorotea Aslanidis, Gianfranco Barra, Elettra Bisetti, Attilio Corsini, Paola Gassman, Carlo Simoni, Gabriele Carrara, Giancarlo Ciccone, Claudio De Davide, Gianni Elsner, Daniela Gatti, Stefanella Giovannini, Raffaele Uzzi, Rodolfo Baldini, Anita Bartolucci, Lombardo Fornara, Gianni Giuliano, Angelica Ippolito, Anna Leonardi, Giuliano Manetti, Loredana Martinez, Aldo Miranda, Enrico Oldoini, Giancarlo Prati, Mariù Safier, Ambra Danon, Fabrizio Moresco, Daria Nicolodi, Giorgina Pazi, Michele Placido, Gerardo Scala, Paola Tanziani, Paolo Bonetti, Emilio Bonucci, Daniele Costantini, Alberto Donatelli, Giorgio Lopez, Gioacchino Maniscalco, Natale Barbone, Patrizia Boccella, Anna Bonaiuto, Raffaele Curi, Massimo Dapporto, Oliviero Dinelli, Anna Fadda, Luigi Antonio Guerra e Gabriella Zamparini, Bernardo Malacrida, Anna Laura Messeri, Vera Bertinetti, Vittorio Fiorito, Maricla Boggio, Giovanni Bormioli, Armando Pugliese, Giandomenico Curi and Augusto Zucchi.

== 1970s ==
Notable alumni in the 1970s include: Annamaria Giromella, Mario Prosperi, Aldo Trionfo, Piero Sammataro, Rino Cassano, Alberto Cracco, Maria Teresa Martino, Paola Montenero, Alfonso Saggese, Renata Biserni, Mauro Avogadro, Renato Cecchetto, Remo Girone, Mario Granato, Giampaolo Saccarola, Sibilla Sedat, Antonello Fassari, Enzo Moncelsi, Mario Scaletta, Danilo Volponi, Maria Letizia Compatangelo, Michela Martini, Marco Mete, Marina Tagliaferri, Daniele Valmaggi, Claudio Bigagli, Benedetta Buccellato, Ennio Fantastichini, Roberta Greganti, Fiorenza Marchegiani, Stefano Sabelli, Susanna Javicoli, Michele Sanzò, Tiziana Bergamaschi, Cloris Brosca, Carlo Cosolo, Umberto Marino, Giuliano Santi, Edoardo Siravo, Caterina Sylos Labini, Riccardo Barbera, Sergio Castellitto, Nicola Cavazza, Walter Corda, Claudio Fattoretto, Sebastiano Lo Monaco, Anna Marchesini, Susanna Marcomeni, Laura Mercatali, Enrica Maria Modugno, Rocco Mortelliti, Francesca Pirani, Laura Saraceni, Luigi Tontoranelli, Franco Castellano, Roberto Cavosi, Sebastiano Nardone, Sergio Rubini, Stefania Spugnini, Massimo Venturiello, Pasquale Anselmo, Lidia Broccolino, Franca D'Amato, Monica Guazzini, Anna Maria Loliva, Margaret Mazzantini, Beatrice Palme, Monica Pariante, Sergio Pierattini, Blas Roca-Rey, Gilberto Visintin, Aurelio Pierucci, Giuseppe Rocca, Giorgio Barberio Corsetti, Lorenza Codignola, Walter Pagliaro, Ennio Coltorti, Domenico Polidoro, Wanda Marasco, Pino Quartullo and Rosalba Trevisan.

== 1980s ==
Notable alumni in the 1980s include: Nicoletta Braschi, Giancarlo Cosentino, Antonella Fattori, Daniela Giordano, Danilo Nigrelli, Marco Presta, Luca Zingaretti, Fabio Camilli, Maria Carmela Cicinnati, Barbara Cupisti, Maria Pia Daniele, Peter Exacoustos, Marco Maltauro, Chiara Meloni, Silvia Mocci, Maria Paiato, Massimo Popolizio, Almerica Schiavo, Valerio Andrei, Cesare Apolito, Margherita Buy, Michele D'Anca, Sabina Guzzanti, Paola Mammini, Laura Marinoni, Emanuela Moschin, Davide Riboli, Pietro Bontempo, Domitilla Calamai, Sabrina Capucci, Marcello Catalano, Sandro Palmieri, Chiara Argelli, Stefania Dadda, Paolo Giovannucci, Luca Lionello, Enrico Pallini, Teresa Pascarelli, Tullio Sorrentino, Maria Luisa Bigai, Roberto Biondi, Tosca D'Aquino, Leonardo Di Carmine, Clarizio Di Ciaula, Antonio Manzini, Stefano Messina, Gabriele Parrillo, Ivan Polidoro, Galatea Ranzi, Alessandro Stefanelli, Paolo Zuccari, Alessandra Acciai, Luca Della Bianca, Andrea Lolli, Massimo Reale, Carolina Rosi, Giacomo Zito, Francesco Biscione, Massimiliano Caprara, Eleonora De Angelis, Alexandra La Capria, Maria Cristina Maccà, Luciano Melchionna, Marianna Morandi, Fabio Poggiali, Alberto Rossi, Federica Santoro, Fernando Scarpa, Francesco Siciliano, Gaia Zoppi, Lorenza Indovina, Valentina Capone, Domiziana Giordano, Francesco Randazzo, Dirk van den Berg and Ferzan Özpetek.

== 1990s ==
Notable alumni in the 1990s include: Francesco Apolloni, Alessio Boni, Arturo Cirillo, Luigi Lo Cascio, Pierfrancesco Favino, Davide Iodice, Fabrizio Gifuni, Lucia Loffredo, Fabrizia Sacchi, David Sebasti, Paolo Briguglia, Roberto Salemi, Elena Stancanelli, Giacinto Palmarini, Roberto Pacini, Clemente Pernarella, Giovanni Scifoni, Helene Nardini, Luca Calvani, Luca Ferrante, Giampiero Lisarelli.

== 2000s ==
Notable alumni since 2000 include: Michele Riondino, Nicoletta Braschi Riccardo Leonelli, Marco Quaglia, Francesco Scianna, Michele Lastella, Marco Foschi, Emanuela Galliussi, Susy Laude, Claudio Gioè, Dajana Roncione, Francesco Montanari, Ludovico Fremont, Raffaella Rea, Cristiano Pasca, Antonio Ianniello, Alessio Vassallo, Roberto Calabrese, Kieran Chauhan, Giancarlo Commare, and Luca Marinelli.
