= Sbragia =

Sbragia is a surname. Notable people with the surname include:

- Giancarlo Sbragia (1926–1994), Italian actor, stage director, and playwright
- Mattia Sbragia (born 1952), Italian actor
- Ricky Sbragia (born 1956), Scottish footballer and manager
