= Roberto Diacetti =

Italian business executive

- Born: Palestrina, Italy
- Occupation: Business executive
- Employer: Enpaia Foundation
- Board member of: Pirelli, Saipem, Banca Ifis, Masi Agricola
- Website: robertodiacetti.it

Roberto Diacetti is an Italian business executive who serves as the director general of the Enpaia Foundation. He also holds board positions at several publicly traded companies, including Pirelli, Saipem, Banca Ifis, and Masi Agricola.

== Early life and education ==
Diacetti was born in Palestrina, a city near Rome, Italy. He graduated in law from LUISS Guido Carli University in Rome. He also holds a specialization in Public Services Management and a Master's degree in Institutional Communication.

== Career ==
Diacetti began his career consulting numerous public and private companies, including Capitale Lavoro SpA where he later became the corporate director. He also served as the director general of the organizing committee for the 2009 FINA World Championships in Rome. He served as the CEO of Risorse per Roma, an engineering and urban development company that is part of Roma Capitale. He held the position between 2010 and 2012. He became the CEO of ATAC SpA, the public transportation agency of Rome, in 2012 and served in the position until 2013.

Diacetti became president of the real estate and corporate events firm Eur SpA in 2015. During his time with Eur SpA, he helped organize the Rome ePrix, an annual Formula E event that began in 2019. He also served as vice president of the Italian World Food Programme for the United Nations, and as a board member of Granarolo SpA.

Since November 2018, Diacetti has been the director general of the Enpaia Foundation, an Italian pension fund for agricultural workers. His work at the Foundation focuses on the support for the agricultural sector of Italy through investments and partnerships with universities like Università Campus Bio-Medico di Roma. He also serves on the board of directors for Banca Ifis (since 2019), Pirelli (since 2023), Saipem, and Masi Agricola SpA, all of which are listed on the Milan Stock Exchange.

Diacetti has lectured or served as faculty in business and sports management programs at institutions such as University of Perugia, Ca' Foscari University of Venice, Link Campus University, and the University of Rome Tor Vergata.

== Personal life ==
Diacetti is married to Manuela Palazzo and has three daughters.
