= Esmeralda Ruspoli =

Italian film actress

Princess Esmeralda
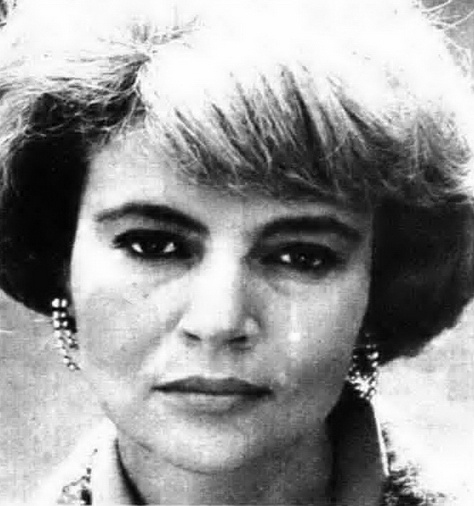
- Ruspoli in 1968
- Born: 24 June 1928; Palazzo Volpi, Rome, Kingdom of Italy
- Died: 1 September 1988 (aged 60); Panarea, Aeolian Islands, Italy
- Spouse: Giancarlo Sbragia
- Issue: 3, including Mattia Sbragia
Names
- Esmeralda Giovanna Amelia Palma Maria dei Principi Ruspoli-Poggio Suasa
- House: Ruspoli
- Occupation: actress
- Education: Lycée français Chateaubriand; Accademia Nazionale di Arte Drammatica Silvio D'Amico

Donna Esmeralda Giovanna Amelia Palma Maria dei Principi Ruspoli-Poggio Suasa (24 June 1928 – 1 September 1988) was an Italian actress and noblewoman. A granddaughter of Mario Ruspoli, 2nd Prince of Poggio Suasa, she was a member of the black nobility in Rome. Ruspoli is known for her portrayals of Mary, Queen of Scots in the 1962 film Seven Seas to Calais and as Lady Montague in the 1968 film Romeo and Juliet.

== Biography ==
Ruspoli was born on 24 June 1928 at the Palazzo Volpi in Rome to Carlo Maurizio Giuseppe Edgardo dei Principi Ruspoli-Poggio Suasa, a member of the House of Ruspoli, and Marina dei Conti Volpi di Misurata, a granddaughter of Giuseppe Volpi, 1st Count of Misurata. She was a granddaughter of Mario Ruspoli, 2nd Prince of Poggio Suasa. Her great-grandparents included Emanuele Ruspoli, 1st Prince of Poggio Suasa, Cocuța Conachi, Maurice de Talleyrand-Périgord, 4th Duke of Dino, 2nd Marquis de Talleyrand, and Elizabeth Beers-Curtis.

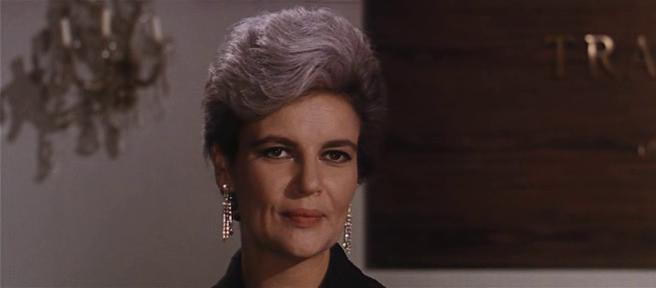
Ruspoli as Lady Gold in the 1966 film Kriminal.

She attended the Lycée français Chateaubriand in Rome until the end of World War II, when she was sent to a boarding school in Lausanne. Upon finishing school in Switzerland, she took nursing courses in Milan. In the 1950s, she quit the nursing courses in order to study theatre, attending the Accademia Nazionale di Arte Drammatica Silvio D'Amico. She went on to act in various films including Kriminal, Romeo and Juliet, L'Avventura, Footprints on the Moon, A Girl Called Jules, The Three Faces, A Place for Lovers, Seven Seas to Calais, and The Hassled Hooker.

She married Italian actor Giancarlo Sbragia and had three children: Viola, Ottavio, and Mattia.

Ruspoli died on 1 September 1988 in Panarea.

== Filmography ==
Ruspoli acted in the following films:

- 1960: L'Avventura as Patrizia
- 1962: Seven Seas to Calais as Mary, Queen of Scots
- 1964: The Adolescents (La Fleur de l'âge, ou Les adolescentes)
- 1965: The Three Faces as Edda
- 1966: Kriminal as Lady Gold
- 1968: A Place for Lovers as the attorney's wife
- 1969: Un incidente di caccia as Amelia
- 1968: Romeo and Juliet as Lady Montague
- 1970: A Girl Called Jules as Laura
- 1972: The Hassled Hooker as Giulia Turrisi
- 1975: Footprints on the Moon
