= Beyond the Door (1982 film) =

1982 film

- Theatrical release poster
- Directed by: Liliana Cavani
- Written by: Liliana Cavani; Enrico Medioli
- Produced by: Francesco Giorgi
- Starring: Marcello Mastroianni; Eleonora Giorgi; Tom Berenger; Michel Piccoli
- Cinematography: Luciano Tovoli
- Edited by: Ruggero Mastroianni
- Music by: Pino Donaggio
- Release date: 5 September 1982
- Running time: 110 minutes
- Country: Italy
- Language: Italian

Beyond the Door (Italian: Oltre la porta, and also known as Beyond Obsession) is a 1982 Italian drama film directed by Liliana Cavani.

== Plot ==
Nina and Matthew Jackson, a young married couple, go about their morning as usual. They bicycle home from the tennis courts, take a shower together, and Matthew gets dressed to head off to work. Once Matthew has left, Nina receives a phone call from the shadowy man that's been following them since the beginning. He tells her he must speak with her and in a panic she drives off. She arrives at Matthew's office to learn he's left for the refinery and she goes to follow him. The man follows her in his car.

Years earlier, Matthew gives a ride to a priest in Marrakech. Upon delivering the priest to his church, Matthew is struck by the sight of the beautiful Nina in her mourning veil as she walks to her Mother's grave. Back at his hotel, Matthew goes to the bar and Nina sits next to him. He makes several attempts to make a date with her over the next few days. Each time she agrees and then sends a sex worker to him-- to varying degrees of success. After the second such instance, Matthew's coworkers make fun of him for his interactions with Nina saying she is known for tricking visiting business men and tourists. Matthew learns from his coworkers that Nina's father is in jail.

Nina goes to visit her father, Enrico Sommi, the same man who was trailing her in the present. He is set up very well in prison, he is allowed access to the library and is even able to pass a translation of Wuthering Heights which he calls "a great love story" to his friend. After arguing with her father, Nina returns to work at a tour agency. Matthew is waiting for her at her office and asks that she help him find a gift for his boss's wife. He goes to the silversmith she recommends and pays full price, knowing that the gift is overpriced and that Nina will get a large cut of the money.

The two go to lunch together the next day but Enrico interrupts them, having been granted leave because of the large sum of money Nina was able to pay the prison thanks to Matthew's largesse. After a tense, threatening discussion, Nina and Enrico leave. Enrico and Nina argue in the car as he accuses her of sleeping with Matthew. He hits her and chases her with the car when she gets out before following her on foot. The two embrace. At a cafe, Enrico admits to hoarding sleeping pills and says he will kill himself if she leaves him. She kisses him, promising to never leave.

Enrico and Nina return to her family's estate and are greeted by the servant Sara. Nina goes to see her Grandmother while Enrico needles Sara for answers about what his former mother-in-law does all day. He asks Nina to have her Grandmother confer with his lawyers and Nina says her Grandmother won't want to. Enrico forcibly kisses her despite Nina's protestations that he not do that in the house.

The following day Enrico and his lawyer discuss Nina's Grandmother's refusal to forgive him. It is revealed that Enrico is in prison for Nina's Mother's death largely due to his Mother-in-law's testimony. Enrico convinces Sara to leave the door open to the Grandmother's room that night so he can slip in and talk to her or kill her. That night Enrico sneaks up to the Grandmother's room only to find Nina has moved her Grandmother. Enrico in a rage runs to a bordello he frequents and Nina finds him there and accompanies him back to prison.

Matthew and Nina meet for coffee. Nina reveals that Enrico is not her father but her step-father and that she promised Enrico she would never see Matthew again. Matthew offers to help her get away but Nina bolts before their coffees are delivered. She runs back to the prison and joins Enrico in his cell where they have sex. Afterwards, Enrico promises not to kill himself and to believe everything she tells him. Enrico then pays someone to follow Nina once she has left the prison.

The next morning, Nina goes to the hotel to lead a tour group but it turns out to just be Matthew on his own. He wants to go with her to the ruins at Aït Benhaddou. After some back and forth where she refuses, he gets her to agree to drive him back to his camp. He then takes her on a helicopter ride to the ruins and the two enjoy a day of frolicking in the beautiful environs and Nina tells him about her real father. They go to a hotel in the area and Nina receives a message from Enrico, his spy told him that Nina and Matthew left the hotel together. The two fight and Nina tells Matthew that she loves Enrico and that Enrico threatened suicide. Matthew helps her rush back to the city where upon arriving at the prison she discovers Enrico playing cards with the Warden and some of the guards. Despondent, she leaves.

Matthew is awoken by a phone call to his room. Enrico's spy can't find Nina and he's afraid she's killed herself. Matthew agrees to help track her down. They visit her biological Father and eventually find her at the tour agency she works for. She has taken Enrico's sleeping pills and is rushed to the hospital. Matthew goes to see Enrico and tells him that he's offered to help Nina escape from Enrico's clutches. Enrico tells him the story of how Nina's Mother died. She discovered Enrico and Nina in bed together when she was still a child and killed herself.

Matthew goes to speak with Nina's Father again who tells him more about his ex-wife. Perhaps Enrico is telling the truth. He also reveals that Sara, the servant in the Grandmother's house, has leprosy which she hides behind gloves and a story of eczema. Matthew goes to Nina's family home and Nina has recovered from her suicide attempt. He tries to convince her to leave Morocco with him. She reveals she feels guilty for her Mother's death and refuses to leave Enrico while he's in prison. He tries to convince Nina to go speak with her Grandmother about Enrico but Nina refuses and flees the house. Sara threatens to call the police on Matthew and he tells her to do it. She doesn't.

Enrico escapes prison and rushes to the house. Matthew greets him at the door and lets him go speak to Nina's Grandmother. She tells Enrico that she forgave Enrico long ago and tried to have things sorted out with the lawyers. She believed that Enrico was traveling in Europe the whole time.

Meanwhile, Matthew blackmails Sara with her leprosy diagnosis to learn where Nina has gone. He chases her down at the airport and tells her to try to live a life without Enrico. He tells her to call him whenever, that he'll come to wherever she is.

Back in the present, Enrico is still tailing Nina. Nina arrives at Matthew's office in a panic and tells him that they must run. Matthew calms her down and insists that they confront Enrico lest he follow them forever. In the parking lot, Enrico confronts Nina about keeping him locked away in prison and she admits it. Matthew confused by the revelations as well as Enrico and Nina speaking in Italian, is all but forgotten. Enrico tells Nina he will wait in the car for her. Nina tells Matthew that she is leaving with Enrico. She says, "He is old now, didn't you notice? I won't even have to keep him in prison." The two drive away in Enrico's car.

== Cast ==
- Marcello Mastroianni as Enrico Sommi
- Eleonora Giorgi as Nina
- Tom Berenger as Matthew Jackson
- Michel Piccoli as Mr. Mutti
- Paolo Bonetti
- Maria Sofia Amendolea as Secretary
- Enrico Bergier
- Marcia Briscoe as Nina's Friend
- Cicely Browne as Nina's Grandmother
- Hadija Lahnida as Hassan's Sister
- Leandro Marcoccio as Ira
- Atik Mohamed as Stranded Motorist
- Abdelkader Moutaa
- Mahjoub Raji
- Fatima Regragui as Grandmother's Housekeeper, Sara
- Giuseppina Romagnoli as Enrico's Prostitute
- Gary Shebex
- Hammadi Tounsi
