= Luigi Squarzina =

Italian dramatist and director (1922–2010)

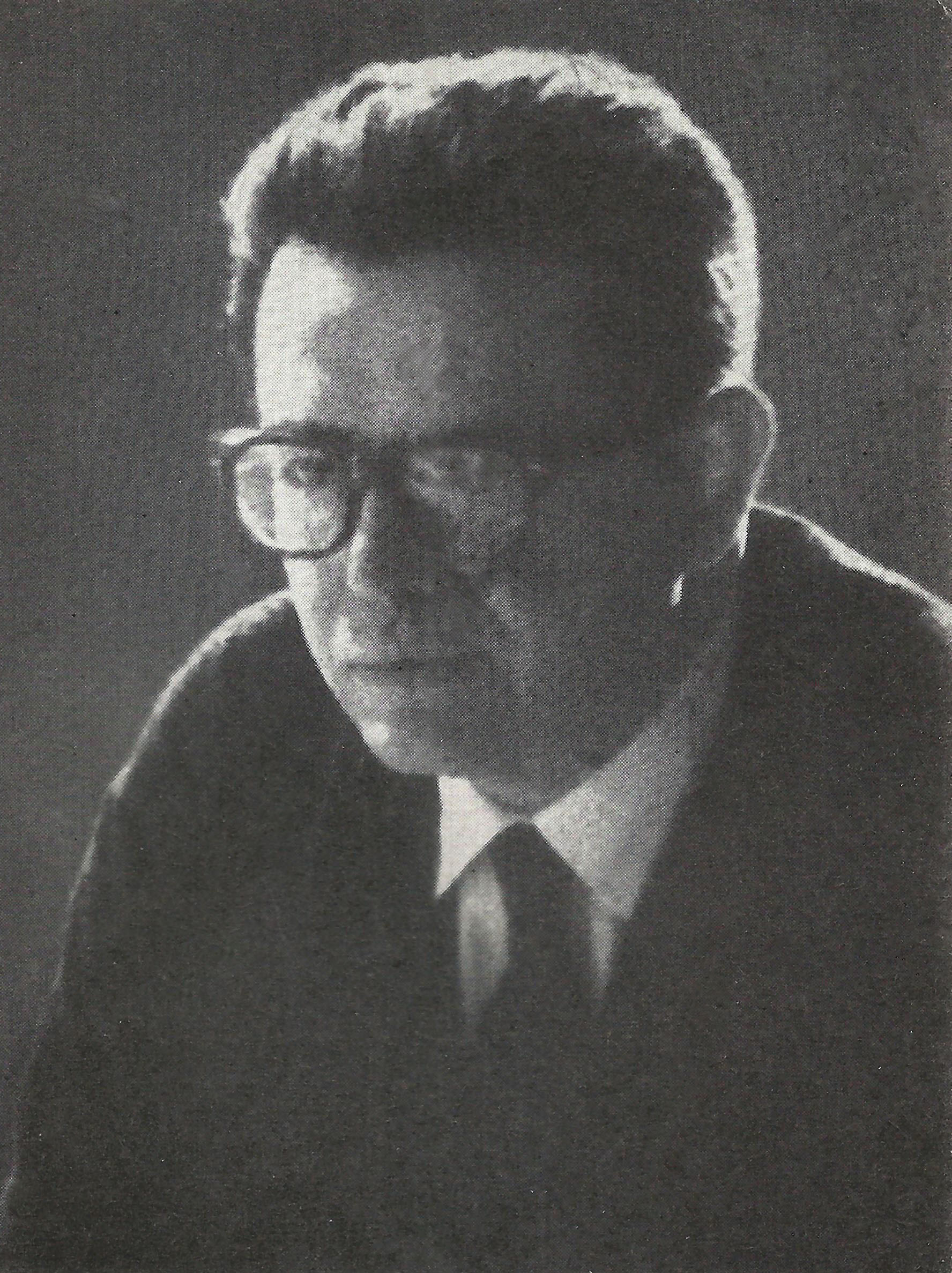
- Born: 18 February 1922; Livorno
- Died: 8 October 2010 (aged 88); Rome

Luigi Squarzina (18 February 1922 – 8 October 2010) was an Italian theatre dramatist and director.

Born in Livorno, Squarzina studied in Rome, at the Liceo Classico Tasso, where he had Vittorio Gassman as classmate. He got a degree cum laude in Law, then he graduated as a director at the Silvio d’Amico Academy of Dramatic Arts. He debuted as a stage director in 1944 with an adaptation of Steinbeck's Of Mice and Men. In 1949, Squarzina debuted as a playwright with The Universal Exhibition, which was never represented in Italy due to censorship. After directing the Teatro Ateneo in Rome, in 1952 he co-founded with Vittorio Gassman the Teatro d'arte italiano ("Italian Theatre of Art"). Squarzina later directed the Teatro Stabile in Genoa between 1972 and 1976 and later the Teatro Stabile in Rome, from 1976 to 1983.

Squarzina was also active as a scholar and as a director of the theater section of the Encyclopedia of Performing Arts by Silvio D'Amico. He was also an occasional actor, and for his debut performance in Francesco Rosi's The Mattei Affair he won the Silver Ribbon for best new actor.
