= Fernando Scarpa =

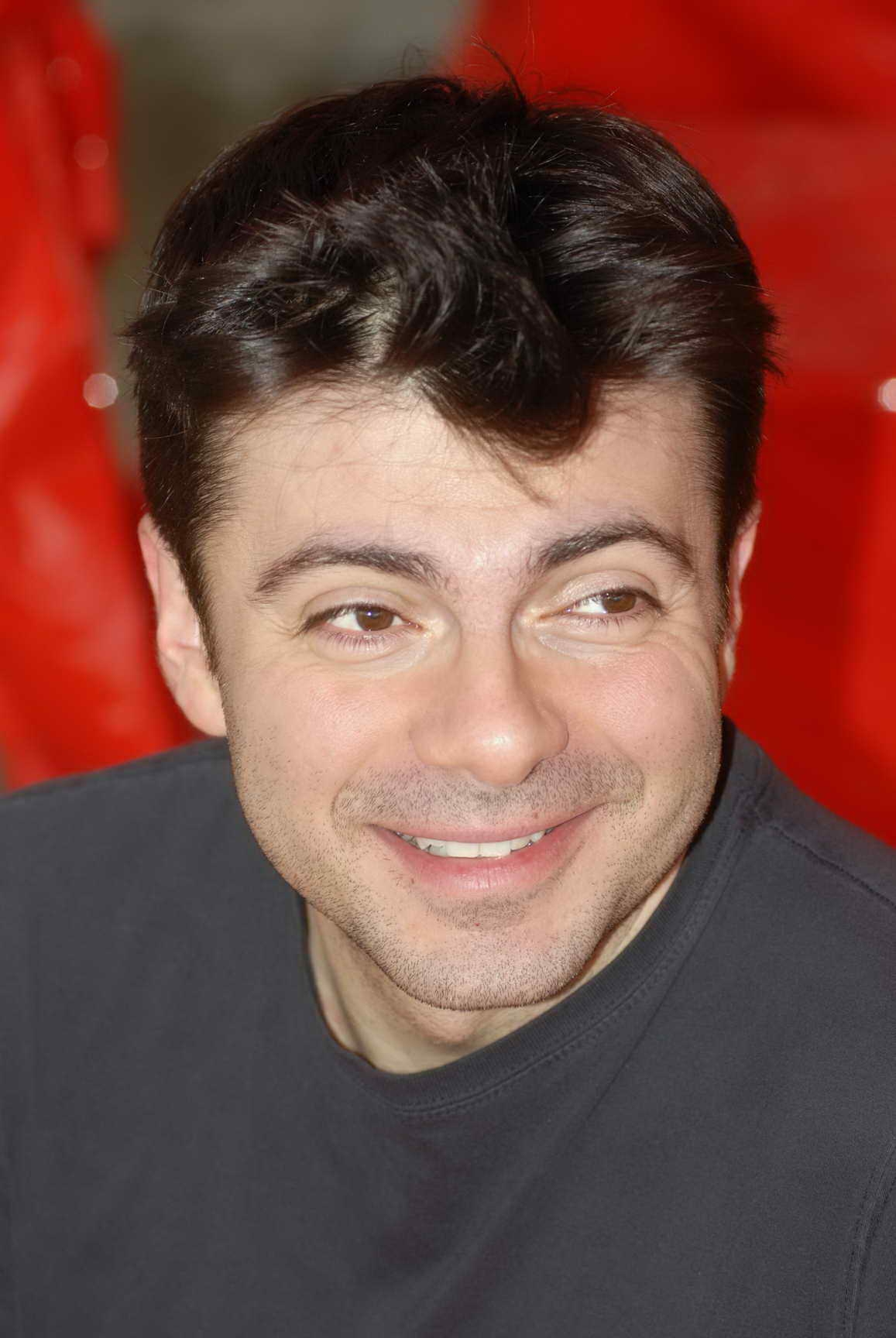
- Scarpa in 2006
- Born: 10 December 1968 (age 57); Milan, Italy
- Occupations: Director; actor

Fernando Scarpa, AKA Fernando J. Scarpa, (born 10 December 1968 in Milan, Italy) is an international award-winning director and actor.

== Film ==
Fernando Scarpa is a graduate of the motion picture directing program at New School University of New York City. Since 2011 he teaches the 'Directing Movies/TV Workshop' and the 'Advanced Directing Workshop' at UCLA Extension Entertainment Studies in Los Angeles.

His debut short film, 'Brothers', won Best Short, Best Screenplay and Best Directorial Debut Awards at the New York International Independent Film and Video Festival in Los Angeles and New York in 2006. In 2013 he produced together with Marco Beltrami the short movie 'Band', directed by Coleman Beltrami. In 2014 he wrote and directed 'Doradus', a short mystery drama on a modern ghost story. Scarpa described it as a possible pilot episode for a TV series.

'Doradus', was nominated as 'Best Short' and was part of the Opening Night at the Philadelphia Independent Film Festival on June 25, 2014. The movie had its West Coast Premier as Official Selection at the Downtown Film Festival of Los Angeles on July 12, 2014, and it was screened at the Los Angeles Fear and Fantasy Film Festival in September 2014. Doradus played at the Raleigh Studio in Hollywood as a part of the International Family Film Festival and won Honorable Mention at the Hollywood & Vine Film Festival. At the Hollyshorts Film Festival, held at the TLC Chinese Theater in Hollywood, the movie won the Audience Choice Award 2014.

In 2015, Scarpa released 'Compound 147' written and directed by Coleman Beltrami, and two episodes of the 30-min comedy/drama series for TV 'Jay ROCCO', written and directed by himself. Both 'Doradus' and 'Jay ROCCO' are currently in further development for TV and theatrical.

In 2016 ans 2017, along with the development of the feature movie 'Galileo 1610', based on a play he wrote and directed about the Italian scientist Galileo Galilei, Scarpa worked on the feature film 'The Book of Ronnie' (AKA 'Panther'), a mystery drama where a modern bio-hacking conspiracy is powered by a revived ancient Egypt myth.

== Theater ==
Fernando Scarpa studied dramatic art at the Silvio D'Amico academy in Rome. He began his career in theater in 1990 and has achieved extensive international recognition in Europe. In 1999, Klaus Maria Brandauer appointed Scarpa as personal assistant to the Burgtheater in Vienna.

In 2001 to 2005, Scarpa directed his own theater in the historical cultural city of Wittenberg, Germany, directing—among other works -- "Hamlet", "Faust", and "Luther", for which he received public and critical acclaim and was granted Federal public funding in 2004. In addition, Scarpa served as the Artistic Supervisor for the Theater des Westens, Berlin for musical shows, and worked as a television director for both the national Italian station RaiUno and major German stations ZDF and SAT1. In 2007, Scarpa directed the musical "Martin Luther King - the King of Love" at the Kaiser Wilhelm Memorial Church in Berlin.

In the United States, Scarpa continued his career in theater. In 2010, he directed 'The Memoirs of Dr. Q.', a play written by Karen Maxwell and 'Henry IV', by Luigi Pirandello. In 2011, Scarpa directed 'Italian Journey', based on J.W. Goethe at the Rossellini Theater in Los Angeles. In 2012, Scarpa wrote and directed 'Galileo 1610' the story of the magic winter of scientific discoveries by Italian scientist Galileo Galilei. For the Saban Theater in Los Angeles, Scarpa directed a staged reading of the comedy 'Intimations of Mortality' written by Ivan Rothberg and Jeanne Grandilli. In 2013, Scarpa starred as an actor in the role of Paolo in the comedy 'Luigi' written by Louise Munson and directed by Annie McVey, which opened at the VS Theater in Los Angeles. In 2014, Scarpa directed William Shakespeare's 'Romeo and Juliet', at the Rossellini Theater in Los Angeles.
