= The Hassled Hooker =

- Directed by: Eriprando Visconti
- Written by: Luigi Malerba; Eriprando Visconti
- Starring: Terence Hill; Paola Pitagora; Martin Balsam
- Cinematography: Marcello Gatti
- Edited by: Antonio Siciliano
- Music by: Giorgio Gaslini
- Release date: 1972
- Language: Italian

The Hassled Hooker (Italian: Il vero e il falso, also known as The True and the False) is a 1972 Italian crime-drama film co-written and directed by Eriprando Visconti.

== Plot ==
In Latina, 100 kilometers from Rome, Luisa Santini is said to have murdered her husband's lover, Norma Zeitzler. The defendant asserts her innocence, but the evidence speaks against her. Prosecutor Turrisi sees the chance of getting a promotion to Rome through this case and is making sure that the process is pushed ahead in great haste. Only the young and inexperienced defense lawyer Marco Manin doubts Santini's guilt. Turrisi eventually wins the guilty verdict and is promoted. Luisa Santini is sentenced to ten years in prison for manslaughter. Marco Manin then changes from criminal to civil law out of disappointment with the judiciary.

Luisa Santini will have three years off her sentence for good conduct, so that she will be released after seven years. Manin, who apparently also has a romantic interest in Santini, picks her up from prison and helps her with the first steps in freedom. He also determines the current address of her husband, who meanwhile lives with a new lover in Rome. When Santini visits her husband, she sees that the supposed new lover is Norma Zeitzler, for whose murder she was convicted. In a blind rage, she kills the woman and subsequently insists that she can no longer be prosecuted because she has already served the sentence. Nevertheless, she will be tried again.

Lawyer Manin then decides to defend Luisa Santini and also to reopen the old proceedings, Turrisi acts again as public prosecutor.

== Cast ==
- Terence Hill as Marco Manin
- Paola Pitagora as Luisa Santini
- Martin Balsam as Lawyer Turrisi
- Adalberto Maria Merli as Claudio Santini
- Shirley Corrigan as Norma Zeitzler
- Maria Teresa Albani as Adalgisa Alberti
- Vittorio Sanipoli as General Attorney
- Esmeralda Ruspoli as Giulia Turrisi
- Piero Gerlini as President of Trial
- Ettore Geri as De Vecchi
- Enzo Robutti as Manca
- Bianca Doria as Witness
- Pietro Tordi as Carabinieri Officier
- Luigi Montini as Police Superintendent
- Calisto Calisti as Petrol Pump Attendant

== See also ==
- List of Italian films of 1972
