= Pirelli =

Italian multinational tyre manufacturer

Pirelli & C. S.p.A.

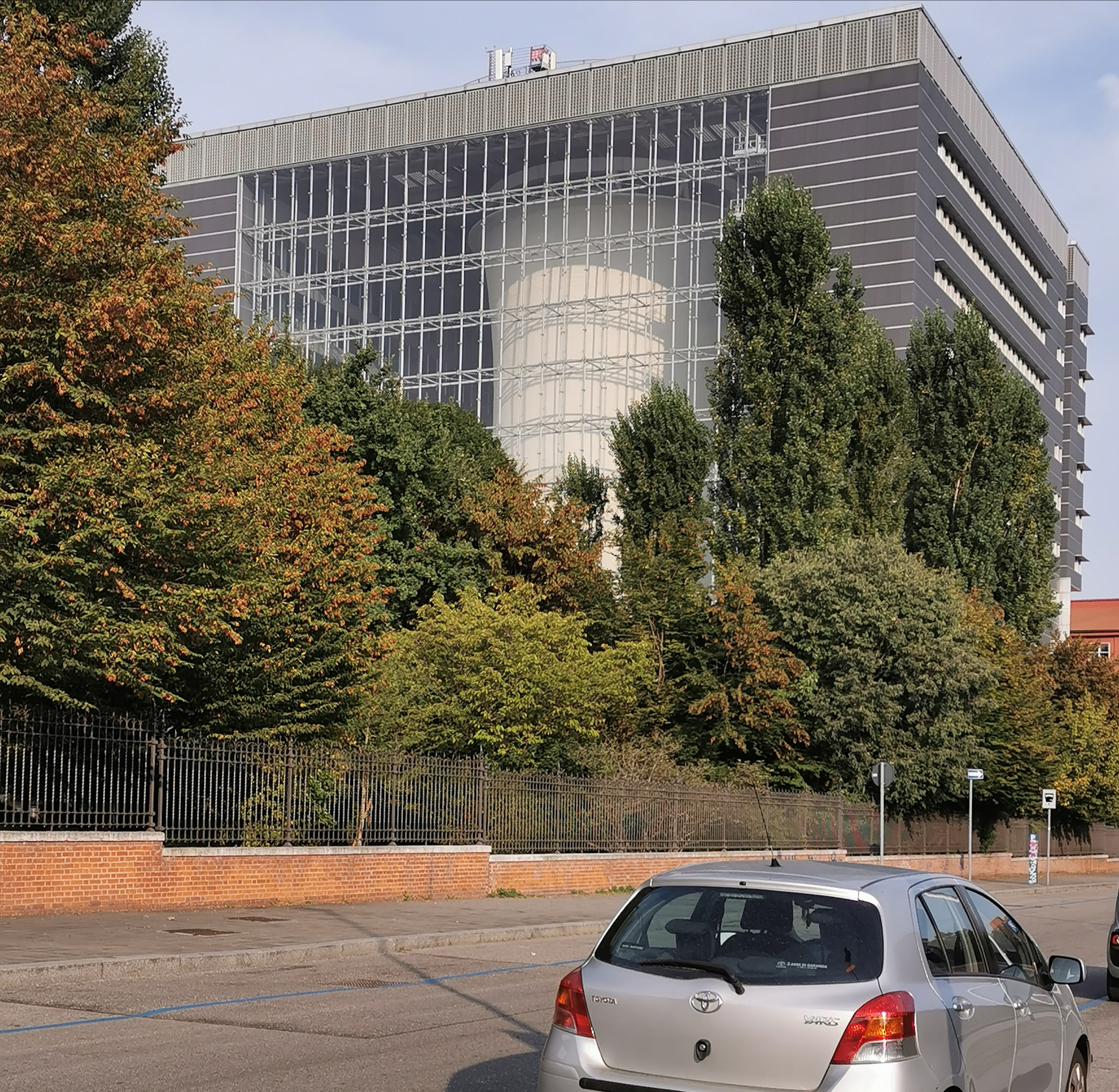
- Headquarters in Milan, Italy
- Type: Public
- Traded as: BIT: PIRC; FTSE MIB
- ISIN: IT0005278236
- Industry: Automotive
- Founded: 28 January 1872; 154 years ago Milan, Italy
- Founder: Giovanni Battista Pirelli
- Headquarters: Milan, Italy 45.5195317°N 9.2111299°E
- Area served: Worldwide
- Key people: Jiao Jian (Chairman); Marco Tronchetti Provera (Executive Vice Chairman); Andrea Casaluci (CEO)
- Products: Tyres for cars, motorcycles, and bicycles
- Revenue: €7.06 billion (2025)
- Operating income: €904 million (2025)
- Net income: €498 million (2025)
- Total assets: €13.35 billion (2025)
- Total equity: €6.46 billion (2025)
- Owners: Investitori istituzionali italiani (35.7%) (Italy); Marco Polo International Italy S.r.l. (ChemChina) (34.1%) (China); Camfin S.p.A. (Marco Tronchetti Provera) (26.2%) (Italy); Other (4%)
- Number of employees: 29,480 (2025)
- Subsidiaries: Pirelli Tyre S.p.A.
- Website: pirelli.com/global/en-ww/homepage

Pirelli & C. S.p.A. is an Italian multinational tyre manufacturer based in the city of Milan, Italy. The company, which has been listed on the Borsa Italiana since 1922, is the 5th-largest tyre manufacturer, and is focused on the consumer production of tyres for cars, motorcycles and bicycles. It is present in Europe, the Asia-Pacific, Latin America, North America, and the post-Soviet states, operating commercially in over 160 countries. It has 18 manufacturing sites, across 12 countries, and a network of around 14,600 distributors and retailers.

Pirelli has been sponsoring sport competitions since 1907 and has been the exclusive tyre partner and supplier for the FIA Formula One World Championship since 2011 and for the FIM World Superbike Championship since 2004. Pirelli's headquarters are located in Milan's Bicocca district. Pirelli is now solely a tyre manufacturing company. In the past, it had been involved in fashion and operated in renewable energy and sustainable mobility.

On 4 October 2017, Pirelli returned to the Milan Stock Exchange after focusing its business on pure consumer products (tyres for car, motorcycles, and bicycles) and related services, and separating the business of industrial tyre. Pirelli's eponymous calendar has been published since 1964, and has featured the contributions of many famous photographers over the years such as Helmut Newton, Steve McCurry, Peter Lindbergh, Richard Avedon, Bruce Weber, Herb Rits, and Annie Leibovitz.

In 2015, China National Chemical Corp. Ltd. (ChemChina) took controlling interest of Pirelli; with the Chinese state-owned company agreeing to maintain the tyre company's ownership structure until 2023. In April 2025, the Board of Directors determined that ChemChina control over Pirelli had ended.

== History ==
Founded in Milan in 1872 by Giovanni Battista Pirelli (1848–1932), the company initially specialised in rubber and derivative processes and also made scuba diving rebreathers and dry suits used by Italian frogmen during World War II. Thereafter, Pirelli's activities were primarily focused on the production of tyre and cables (for energy and telecommunications). In 2005, Pirelli sold its cable division to Goldman Sachs, which changed the new group's name to Prysmian. In the 1950s, Alberto Pirelli commissioned the building of a skyscraper, Pirelli Tower, in the same Milanese area that housed the very first Pirelli factory during the 19th century.

In 1974, Pirelli invented the "wide radial tyre", upon a request from the Lancia rally racing team for a tyre strong enough to withstand the power of the new Lancia Stratos. At that time, racing tyres were either slick tyres made with the cross ply technique (very wide tyres with a reduced sidewall height), or radial tyres, which were too narrow to withstand the Stratos' power and did not provide enough grip. Both were unusable for the Lancia Stratos, as the radials were destroyed within 10 km, and the slicks too stiff. Lancia asked Pirelli for a solution, and in 1975 Pirelli created a wide tyre with a reduced sidewall height like a slick but with a radial structure. Subsequently, Porsche started using the same tyres with the Porsche 911 Turbo. In 1988, Pirelli acquired the Armstrong Rubber Company, which was headquartered in New Haven, Connecticut, US for $190 million.

In 2000, Pirelli sold its terrestrial fibre optic cables business to Cisco and its optical components operations to Corning, for 5 billion euro. It invested, through Olimpia, part of the resulting liquidity to become a majority shareholder in Telecom Italia in 2001, maintaining this position until 2007. In 2002 the company started a range of Pirelli-branded clothing, watches and eyewear. In 2005, Pirelli sold its Cables, Energy Systems and Telecommunications assets to Goldman Sachs and the newly formed company was named Prysmian. In the same year, 2005, Pirelli opened its first tyre production plant in Shandong province, China. This was the beginning of the group's production complex in the country. In 2006, Pirelli chose Slatina for its first tyre production plant in Romania, expanding the facility in 2011.

In 2010, Pirelli completed its conversion to a pure tyre company by selling Pirelli Broadband Solutions and spinning off the real estate assets of Pirelli Re. Fondazione Pirelli was established in the same year to safeguard and celebrate the company's past and to promote business culture as an integral part of Italy's national cultural assets. In March 2015, it was announced that Pirelli shareholders had accepted a €7.1 billion bid from ChemChina, together with Camfin and LTI, for the company. The transaction was completed and the company was delisted in November 2015.

In May 2017, it was announced that Pirelli returns to the world of cycling with a new road cycling tyre range, P ZERO Velo. In September 2017, the company announced its intentions to sell up to 40 per cent of its equity capital in an initial public offering as it plans to return to the Milan stock exchange in October.

In March 2019 Pirelli announced a new range of mountain biking tyres, called Scorpion. In 2021, Pirelli introduced 18-inch tyres for the new aerodynamic and technical changes for 2022 in Formula One. As of May 2024, Pirelli has a market capitalisation of $6.69 billion. On May 29, 2024 Silk Road Fund began the total sale of its shareholding. On May 30, 2024, the share price fell as a result of the sale of the entire stake of Silk Road Fund. While Tronchetti Provera's Camfin strengthened its shareholding together with other Italian investors.

In April 2025, the Board of Directors, in compliance with the Italian government Decreto del Presidente del Consiglio dei Ministri 4 agosto 2023 (DPCM) and the IFRS 10 international accounting principle, determined that Sinochem's control over Pirelli had ended.

== Business areas ==
- Pirelli is focused on the consumer business, producing tyres for cars, motorcycles, and bicycles.

=== Car products range ===
- P ZERO: Tyres for ultra-high performance cars. P ZERO branding is used for dry weather Formula One tyres, along with other racing tyres.
- Cinturato: Tyres for high-end cars. Cinturato branding is used for wet-weather Formula One tyres.
- Sottozero: Winter tyres for high-end cars. Sottozero branding is used for WRC tyres.
- Carrier: Tyres for vans.
- Ice: Tyres designed for extremely low temperatures.
- Scorpion: Tyres for SUV and cross-over.

=== Moto products range ===
- Diablo: Road and track tyres.
- Angel: Street and commuting tyres.
- Scorpion: Road and off-road tyres.

=== Velo products range ===
- P ZERO Velo: Road racing.
- Cycl-e: Urban and electric.
- Scorpion: Mountain bike.
- Cinturato: Gravel.

== Corporate affairs ==
=== Major shareholders ===
Pirelli shareholders as of January 2025:

Shareholder	Stake %
Marco Polo International Italy (an intermediate holding company for Sinochem)	37.0%
Institutional Investors	31.6%
Camfin S.p.A.	26.4%
Retail	5.0%

=== Board of directors ===
The list of Pirelli Board of Directors as of April 2023:

Position	Name
Chairman	Li Fanrong
Executive Vice Chairman and CEO	Marco Tronchetti Provera
Deputy-CEO	Giorgio Luca Bruno
Director	Yang Shihao
Director	Wang Feng
Independent Director	Paola Boromei
Independent Director	Domenico De Sole
Independent Director	Roberto Diacetti
Independent Director	Fan Xiaohua
Independent Director	Giovanni Lo Storto
Independent Director	Marisa Pappalardo
Independent Director	Tao Haisu
Director	Giovanni Tronchetti Provera
Independent Director	Wei Yintao
Director	Zhang Haitao

=== Finances ===
	2016	2017	2018	2019	2020	2021	2022	2023	2024	2025
Total revenue (€ billions)	6.1	5.9	5.6	5.6	4.6	5.6	6.9	6.9	7.1	7.1
Operating income (€ billions)	0.6	0.7	0.8	0.8	0.3	0.6	0.8	0.8	0.9	0.9
Net income (€ billions)	0.1	0.2	0.4	0.4	0.03	0.3	0.4	0.5	0.5	0.5
Total assets (€ billions)	14.4	12.7	13.0	13.9	13.8	13.9	13.9	13.5	13.7	13.4
Total equity (€ billions)	3.3	4.2	4.6	4.8	4.6	5.0	5.5	5.6	5.9	6.5
Employees	37,050	28,760	30,640	30,670	29,360	29,020	29,750	30,680	30,640	29,480

== Marketing ==
The Pirelli Calendar is published annually, featuring actresses and fashion models. The calendar also features the work of fashion photographers, including Richard Avedon, Peter Lindbergh, Annie Leibovitz, and Patrick Demarchelier. The Pirelli Internetional Award is given annually for the best international multimedia involving the communication of science and technology conducted entirely on the Internet. "Power is nothing without control" was the well-known slogan of Pirelli Tyre Company, and was featured in numerous television and print advertisements. Pirelli is the long-serving main sponsor of Italian football club Inter Milan, having sponsored the Italian team since the 1995–96 season.

== Sponsorship ==
=== Football ===
Pirelli has a history of sponsoring football teams. Pirelli is well known for its long-term primary sponsorship of the Italian football club Inter Milan between 1995 and 2021. Pirelli previously appeared as a sponsor on the shirts of the Maltese football club Valletta for a short time. In reference to Brazil striker Ronaldo’s usual goal celebration of both arms outstretched, Pirelli ran a 1998 commercial in which he replaced the figure of Christ from the Christ the Redeemer statue that towers over his home city of Rio de Janeiro while in an Inter Milan strip. It was controversial with the Catholic Church.

Pirelli's sponsorship of football teams is not limited to Europe, South America is a key market and as a result, successful clubs have also been sponsored by the tyre company. The Brazilian team Palmeiras, Uruguayan team Peñarol and Argentinian side Vélez Sársfield all had Pirelli as a shirt sponsor. When English football club Burton Albion Football Club built their new stadium in 2005, Pirelli became the title sponsor of the new ground. This was because the new stadium, named Pirelli Stadium lies next to the Pirelli factory in Burton-upon-Trent, Staffordshire, England. In 2009, Pirelli became the title sponsor of the Chinese Super League (CSL), China's top-tier football league. In 2012, the company became a major sponsor of the Russian Cup.

=== Motorsport ===
Pirelli is the event title sponsor of the Spanish and Hungarian Grands Prix and sponsored the 2018 French Grand Prix. The company was the title sponsor of the Pirelli World Challenge from 2011 to 2018. Pirelli supported rally with their FIA Pirelli Star Driver program as an initiative to support young rally drivers. It was the sole supplier in the top tier of World Rally Championship between 2008–2010 and 2021–2024. Since its first involvement in WRC in 1973, the manufacturer won 181 events, and produced 25 WRC Driver Champions including Colin McRae (1995), Petter Solberg (2003), Sébastien Loeb (2008–2010). Pirelli has also been a sponsor of rally and the late gymkhana driver Ken Block's Hoonigan Racing Division since 2010.

=== America's Cup ===
Pirelli was sponsor of Emirates Team New Zealand in the 35th America's Cup (2017).

=== Winter Sports ===
Pirelli sponsored Alpine World Ski Championship and Ice Hockey World Championship IIHF from 2017 to 2021. The company is also sponsor of the Italian Ski Team and of the Swiss Ski Team.

=== Baseball ===
Pirelli also was a sponsor of the Los Angeles Dodgers of Major League Baseball from 2014 to 2020.

== Motorsport ==
Pirelli was the official tyre partner and supplier of the World Rally Championship from 2008 to 2010 until the company withdrew to focus on its Formula One commitments. Pirelli returned to the championship in 2014, albeit only partnering tyres for a few private teams as Michelin was the major tyre partner and supplier. Pirelli stepped up their involvement in the championship when they signed a deal to supply tyres to all Junior WRC participants, with its champions receiving a Ford Fiesta R5 with free tyres, fuel and free rally registration package for the next season's World Rally Championship-2. Pirelli subsequently returned full time to the WRC between 2021–2024. Pirelli was also partnered Grand-Am Rolex Sports Car Series from 2008 until 2010 before being replaced by Continental AG in 2011. The company has been the official supplier of the GT World Challenge America since 2011 and the GT World Challenge Europe Endurance Cup since 2013.

=== Formula One ===
Pirelli has been the sole tyre supplier in Formula One since 2011 following Bridgestone's decision to withdraw from the role at the end of 2010. Pirelli previously competed in Formula One from 1950–1958, 1981–1986 and 1989–1991. Pirelli also supplies tyres for the FIA Formula 2 Championship (formerly GP2 Series), FIA Formula 3 Championship (formerly GP3 Series) and F1 Academy, that form the feeder series to Formula One. The 2025 Dutch Grand Prix marked Pirelli's 500th Grand Prix entry. Pirelli's deal is due to end after the 2027 Formula One World Championship.

The Italian tyre manufacturer introduced a colour coding system to help identify the tyre compounds used by drivers during races. Each compound has its own colour, which appears on the sidewalls of the tyre. Since the 2019 season, Pirelli has used three colours to identify its dry-weather P Zero tyres: white for hard, yellow for medium, and red for soft. As well as the dry-weather slick tyres, there are two wet-weather grooved tyres: green for the intermediate and blue for the full wet. These tyres are branded Cinturato, a name that dates back to the 1950s. At the start of Pirelli's Formula One tenure in 2011, the company was given the technically challenging task of designing tyres that degraded rapidly in order to promote more pit stops and overtaking, with the aim of making the races more exciting and entertaining. However, the brief from the sport's organisers has changed over the years, as the cars themselves evolved with the introduction of the turbo hybrid era in 2014.

Pirelli has faced controversy on a number of occasions in Formula One, especially during the 2013 British Grand Prix, which featured multiple tyre failures. Pirelli subsequently changed the construction of the tyres to prevent further incidents, switching to Kevlar belts. At the 2015 Belgian Grand Prix, a tyre on Sebastian Vettel's Ferrari suffered from a blowout at 320 km/h (200 mph). Immediately after the race Pirelli claimed that excessive wear caused the blowout but following a more detailed analysis, the company said that in fact, a cut had caused the tyre failure. A number of major changes to the Formula One tyres were introduced for the 2017 season. The most obvious visual difference was an increase of width by 25%, both front and rear, increasing from 245-mm to 305-mm at the front and 325-mm to 405-mm at the rear. The actual rim size remained unchanged from the traditional 13 inches. The faster cornering speeds as a result of this change imposed significantly increased loads on the tyres. Pirelli was consequently asked to produce tyres with less degradation that were more resistant to overheating, for the fastest cars in Formula One history.

A far-reaching alteration to the Formula One technical regulations for 2022, covering every aspect of the car, prompted another significant change to the tyres. With an imminent move to 18-inch rims after more than 50 years of the 13-inch size, Pirelli's 2022 tyres maintain the same tread width as before, but diameter has increased from 660 millimetres to 720 millimetres. The sidewall height is also reduced to give the tyres a more modern low-profile look. For the new regulations of the 2026 season, Pirelli has changed the coloured rings to a chequered flag themed ring, with the compounds being retained.

=== Superbike World Championship ===
Pirelli is the only allowed tyre brand in the FIM Superbike World Championship since 2004 (along with its support classes, such as the Supersport World Championship) until 2026. Pirelli has also been awarded the contract for the control tyre supply in the British Superbike Championship from 2008 until at least 2010.

=== Grand Prix motorcycle racing ===
Pirelli officially replaces Dunlop as the sole tyre supplier for Moto3 and Moto2 starting in 2024. This was announced by Dorna Sports via the official MotoGP website. The Pirelli and Dorna contract has a duration of three seasons.

Starting from 2027 to 2031 seasons Pirelli will be official sole tyre partner and supplier to MotoGP premier class replacing Michelin after eleven seasons.

=== Speedboats ===
Pirelli has partnered with Italian Boat Manufacture Sacs Tecnorib Spa to create the Pirelli Rigid inflatable Boat. They have models ranging from 30 to 50 feet, including small tenders (X and J Models).

Their most recent and popular collaboration has been with German Luxury Car Tuner Mansory. The new collaboration has been showcased to the public at the 2024 Cannes Boat Show and 2024 Genoa Boat Show.

== Overseas investment ==
In April 2012, Pirelli & C. SpA signed a joint venture agreement with Indonesian counterpart PT Astra Autoparts a subsidiary of PT Astra International for the construction of a motorcycle tyre plant with a total investment of $120 million. 60 per cent of shares will be held by Pirelli. Pirelli hoped to strengthen its presence in the largest motorcycle market in the world, Southeast Asia which has 250 million motorcycles.

== Audio system ==
In July 2018, Pirelli launched a Formula One wheel-shaped Bluetooth speaker, P Zero Sound. The Bluetooth speaker measures 330-millimetre (12.9 in) in diameter, weighs 9.5 kg (21 pounds) and has a 100-watt amplifier, a 100-millimetre (3.9 in) mid-woofer, a 25-millimetre (0.98 in) tweeter and also offers Bluetooth 4.0 with AptX for wireless connectivity. IXOOST is the manufacturer of P Zero Sound speaker, which majorly manufactures Motorsports-themed audio systems. The wheel-shaped speaker costs €2400, which is equivalent to about $2,800.

== See also ==
- List of Italian companies
- Formula One tyres
