= Enpaia Foundation =

Italian public national mutual fund

- Fondazione Enpaia
- Abbreviation: ENPAIA
- Formation: 1936
- Type: Public national mutual fund
- Legal status: Privatized entity
- Purpose: Pension and welfare management for agricultural workers
- Headquarters: Rome, Italy
- Region served: Italy
- Fields: Social security, agriculture
- Members: Approximately 40,000 individuals and 9,000 companies
- President: Giorgio Piazza
- Director General: Roberto Diacetti
- Website: www.enpaia.it

The Enpaia Foundation (Italian: Fondazione Enpaia) is an Italian public national mutual fund managing mandatory and supplementary pensions. Founded in 1936, it provides pension and welfare services for agricultural workers. It was privatized in 1994 as required by Legislative Decree 509/1994, with oversight being maintained by the Ministry of Labour and Social Policies. It manages €2.1 billion in assets for approximately 40,000 individuals and 9,000 companies in Italy's agricultural sector.

== History ==
The Enpaia Foundation was established in 1936 as a public social security institution. It was established to provide pension and welfare services for agricultural workers in the country. It was created by the National Federation of Agricultural Workers and legally recognized in 1937. In 1962, it took the name National Institute for Social Security and Welfare for Agricultural Employees (Italian: Ente Nazionale di Previdenza e di Assistenza per gli impiegati dell’Agricoltura” (ENPAIA)).

In 1994, Enpaia was privatized as required by the Italian Parliament's Legislative Decree 509/1994. Giorgio Piazza was appointed president of the foundation in 2017, with Roberto Diacetti becoming director general in 2018.

In 2020, Enpaia began hosting the annual Forum Enpaia, a conference on economic and social challenges such as sustainability and agriculture. It also collaborates with universities for research and training in the agro-food sector, and in 2020 became a shareholder in Campus Bio-Medico SpA by signing an agreement to develop scientific research and educational programs.

Enpaia supports Italy’s agricultural sector through direct investments in companies such as Granarolo SpA, BF S.p.A., and Masi Agricola SpA, all associated with the "Made in Italy" agro-food industry. In 2023, Enpaia invested €30 million in Granarolo for its growth strategy.

== Structure and services ==
Enpaia serves approximately 40,000 individuals and 9,000 companies in Italy’s agricultural sector. It oversees a portfolio of approximately €2.1 billion, with €1.6 billion in liquid assets and the remainder in real estate, primarily in Rome. Its investment strategy emphasizes prudence and diversification to support the agricultural sector, which contributes 2% to Italy’s GDP (30% including the agro-food sector).

Enpaia manages several pension and welfare schemes, including Gestione Ordinaria, Gestione Separata Periti Agrari, Gestione Separata Agrotecnici, and Gestione Speciale Consorzi di Bonifica.
