= Angelo Maria Ripellino =

Italian translator, poet, linguist and academic

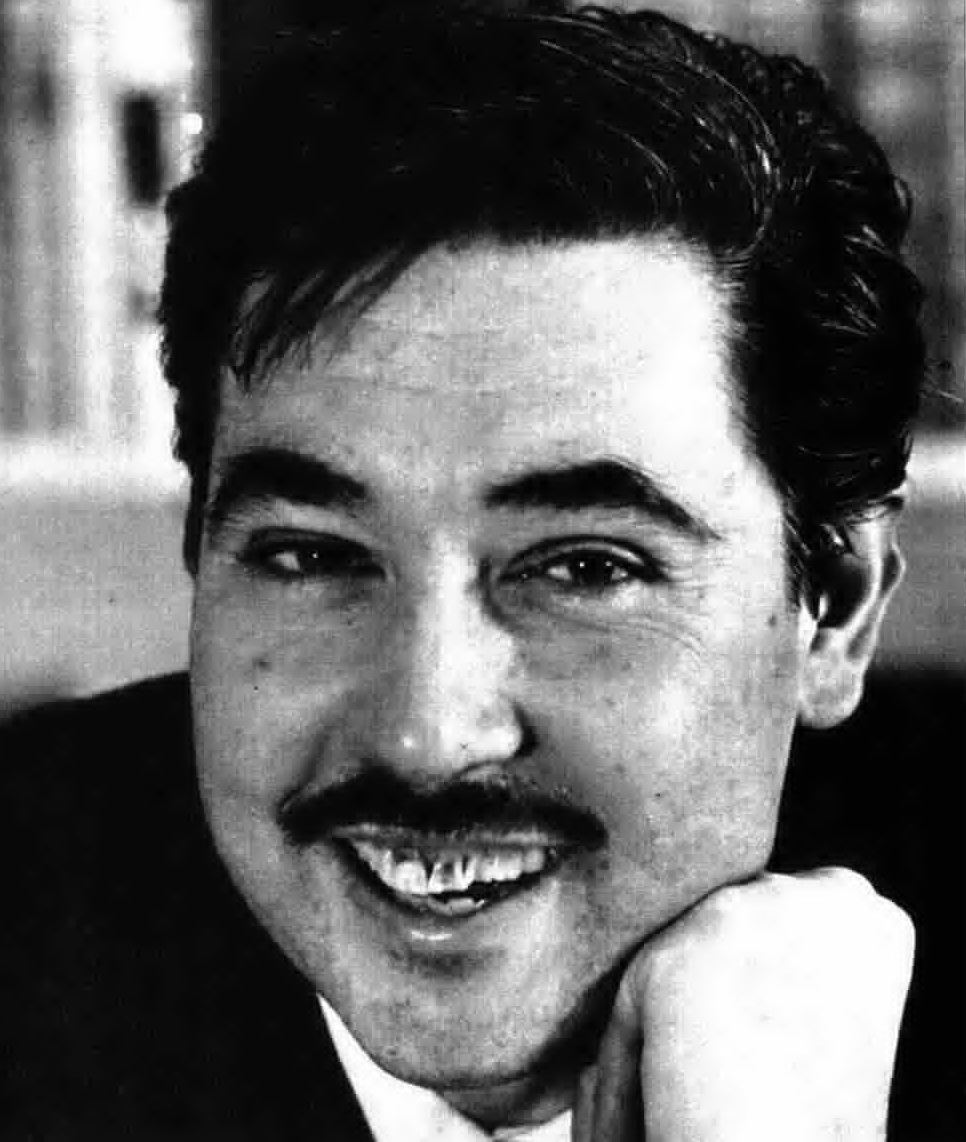
- Born: 4 December 1923; Palermo, Italy
- Died: 21 April 1978 (aged 54); Rome, Italy
- Occupation: Writer

Angelo Maria Ripellino (4 December 1923 - 21 April 1978) was an Italian translator, poet, linguist and academic.

== Life and career ==
Born in Palermo, the son of a high school professor, in 1945 Ripellino graduated in Slavistics at the University of Palermo. In 1947 he enrolled the filmmaking courses at the Centro Sperimentale di Cinematografia; the same year he married Ela Hlochova, a Czech student of Italian literature he had known during a 1946 study travel in Prague, who would who would become his closer collaborator.

Active as a theatre critic and a poet since 1940, after his university degree he focused his works on translations, critical essays and literary history books about Russian, Polish and Czech-Slovak literature. Among Ripellino's major works are Poesia russa del Novecento ("Russian Poetry of the 20th Century", 1954), Majakovskij e il teatro russo d’avanguardia ("Majakovsky and Russian avant-garde theatre", 1959), Magic Prague (Italian:Praga magica, 1973). He had a key role in popularizing several Russian authors to the Italian public, notably Boris Pasternak and Alexander Blok.

In 1965 he won the Viareggio Prize with Il trucco e l’anima. I maestri della regia nel teatro russo del Novecento ("The Trick and the Soul. The masters of stage direction in 20th-century Russian theatre"). He authored the Slavic theatre section of the Encyclopedia of Performing Arts. He collaborated with several important publications, including Corriere della Sera and L'Espresso, and was consultant for Russian literature for Einaudi publisher. Ripellino also had an important academic career, first as a lecturer of Slavic philology and Czech language at the University of Bologna, and later as professor of Russian language and literature and Czech-Slovak literature at the Sapienza University of Rome.

Ripellino suffered from tuberculosis from early age and underwent a pneumectomy. He died because of the consequences of a cardiovascular crisis in 1978.
