= A Place for Lovers =

1968 film by Vittorio De Sica

- Theatrical release poster
- Directed by: Vittorio De Sica
- Written by: Brunello Rondi (play); Julian Zimet; Peter Baldwin; Ennio De Concini; Tonino Guerra; Cesare Zavattini
- Produced by: Arthur Cohn; Carlo Ponti
- Starring: Faye Dunaway; Marcello Mastroianni
- Cinematography: Pasqualino De Santis
- Edited by: Adriana Novelli
- Music by: Manuel De Sica; Lee Konitz
- Production companies: Compagnia Cinematografica Champion; Les Films Concordia
- Distributed by: Metro-Goldwyn-Mayer
- Release dates: 19 December 1968 (Italy); 17 September 1969 (France)
- Running time: 88 minutes
- Countries: Italy; France
- Languages: Italian; English

A Place for Lovers (Italian: Amanti, lit. 'Lovers'; French: Le Temps des amants, lit. 'The Time of Lovers') is a 1968 romantic drama film directed by Vittorio De Sica and written by Brunello Rondi, Julian Zimet, Peter Baldwin, Ennio De Concini, Tonino Guerra and Cesare Zavattini. The film is based on the play Gli Amanti by Brunello Rondi and Renaldo Cabieri and was distributed by Metro-Goldwyn-Mayer.

The film stars Faye Dunaway as a terminally ill American fashion designer in Venice, Italy who has a whirlwind affair with a race-car driver (played by Marcello Mastroianni). It is considered to be one of the worst films ever made.

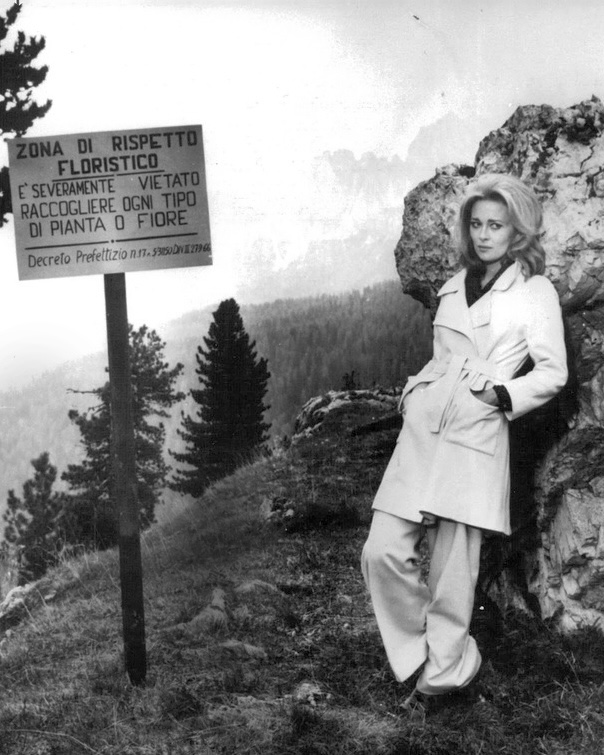
Dunaway in A Place for Lovers (1968)

== Plot ==
Fashion designer Julia is tired of living because she is suffering from malignant cancer. When she leaves for her last holiday in Cortina d'Ampezzo, she meets the vital Valerio. The two fall in love instantly, but Julia does not reveal her secret to Valerio. When Valerio learns that she's dying, he pretends to know nothing, continuing the love affair until the end.

== Cast ==
- Faye Dunaway as Julia
- Marcello Mastroianni as Valerio
- Caroline Mortimer as Maggie
- Enrico Simonetti as Party Host
- Karin Eugh as Griselda
- Esmeralda Ruspoli as Attorney's wife
- Yvonne Gilbert as Marie
- Mirella Pamphili as Party Guest
- David Archell
- Martha Buckman

== Soundtrack ==
Ella Fitzgerald provides two songs: the title song and "Lonely Is." Both songs may be found on the Verve release Jukebox Ella: The Complete Verve Singles, Vol. 1.

== Reception ==
A Place for Lovers opened to generally negative reviews. Roger Ebert of the Chicago Sun-Times called it the "most godawful piece of pseudo-romantic slop I've ever seen!" and Charles Champlin of the Los Angeles Times referred to it as "the worst movie I have seen all year and possibly since 1926." Rex Reed wrote that the film "[l]ooks not so much directed as whittled to death." Time magazine called the film "Woefully inept ... Marcello Mastroianni displays all the zest of a man summoned up for tax evasion. The five scriptwriters who supposedly worked on the film must have spent enough time at the water-cooler to flood a camel." Katherine Caroll's review in the New York Daily News called the film "about as exciting to watch as a game of tiddly-winks." Critic Manny Farber stated that "one of the best laughs is watching Dunaway working on the subject of despair."

The film is widely considered among the worst of all time and was listed in the 1978 book The Fifty Worst Films of All Time, which called the film "a putrid tearjerker." The Italian edition of Vanity Fair included it on its list of the 20 worst films.

== See also ==
- List of 20th century films considered the worst
- Cleo from 5 to 7, Agnes Varda's 1962 film that is similar in content
- Italian neorealism
- 8 1/2, Federico Fellini's 1963 film featuring Mastroianni
