= Giancarlo Sbragia =

Italian actor (1926–1994)

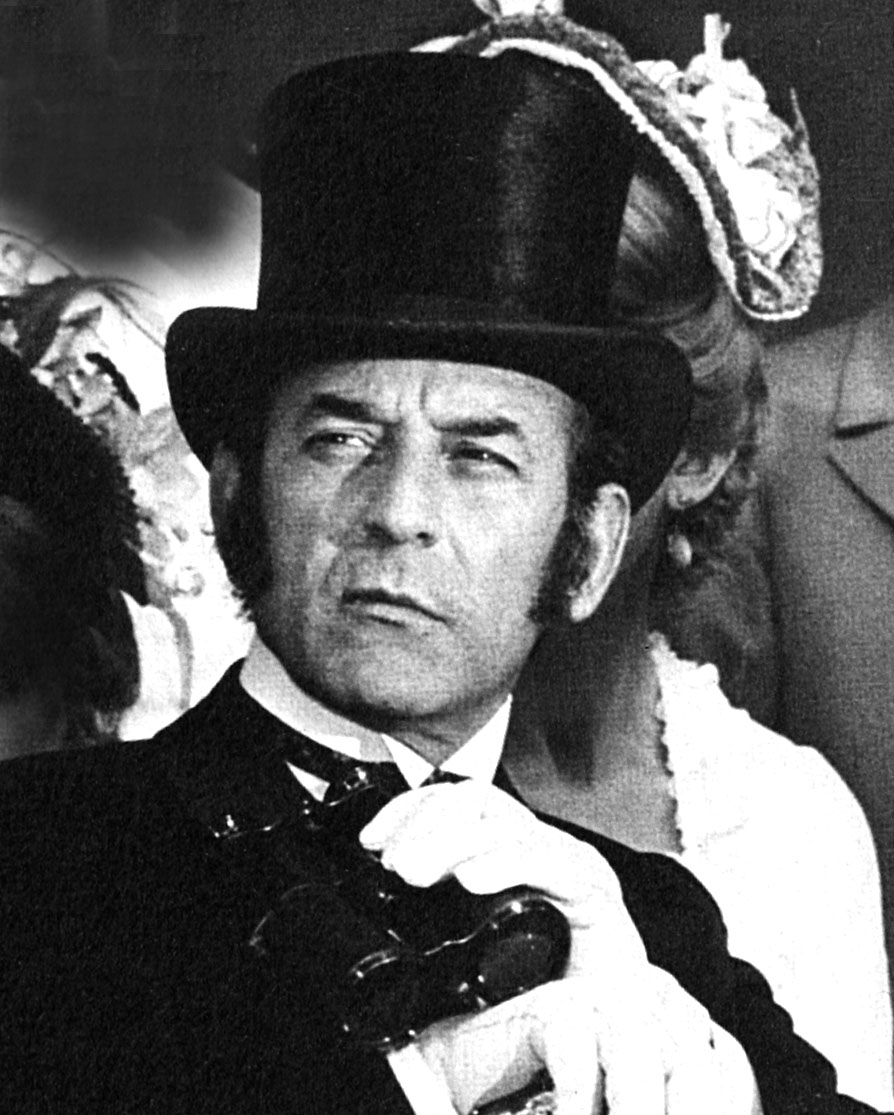
- Born: 14 March 1926; Rome, Italy
- Died: 28 June 1994 (aged 68); Rome, Italy
- Other name: Gian Carlo Sbragia
- Occupations: actor, voice actor, stage director, playwright
- Years active: 1947-1988
- Spouse(s): Princess Esmeralda Ruspoli; Alessandra Panaro (1992-1994) (his death)

Giancarlo Sbragia (14 March 1926 – 28 June 1994) was an Italian actor, voice actor, stage director and playwright.

== Life and career ==
Born in Rome, Sbragia graduated at the Silvio d’Amico Academy of Dramatic Arts in 1947, and debuted on stage at the Piccolo Teatro in Milan, with the theatrical company of Giorgio Strehler. He debuted as a playwright in 1953 with the play Le veglie inutili, and in 1956 he debuted as a stage director with the drama Ricorda con rabbia. Between 1958 and 1959 he worked with the theatrical company of Michelangelo Antonioni and Luca Ronconi, and in 1960 he was co-founder, together with Enrico Maria Salerno and Ivo Garrani, of the stage company "Attori Associati". Between the 1960s and the 1970s Sbragia was also very active on television series, notably playing Napoleon in the successful drama series I grandi camaleonti.

=== Personal life ===
Sbragia was first married to the actress Princess Esmeralda Ruspoli. They had three children, including the actor Mattia Sbragia. From 1992 until his death, he was married to the actress Alessandra Panaro.

== Filmography ==
Year	Title	Role	Notes
1951	Fugitive in Trieste		
1959	Wolves of the Deep	Idrofonista	
1960	Messalina	Aulo Celso	
1960	Goliath and the Dragon	Tindaro	
1961	Laura nuda	Il prete	
1962	War Gods of Babylon	Arbace	
1963	The Fall of Rome	Giunio	
1964	The Adolescents (La Fleur de l'âge, ou Les adolescentes)		
1964	Senza sole né luna		
1966	Francesco di Assisi	Francesco's father	
1971	The Bloodstained Butterfly	Alessandro Marchi	
1971	Le Saut de l'ange	Forestier	
1972	Policeman		
1972	Equinozio		
1973	Tony Arzenta - Big Guns	Luca Dennino	
1976	Death Rage	Gennaro Gallo	
1977	Highway Racer	Maresciallo Tagliaferri	
1978	Nest of Vipers	Maffei	
1988	The Camels	Anna's Father	(final film role)
