= Encyclopedia of Performing Arts =

1954–1966 Italian language encyclopedia

Enciclopedia dello Spettacolo
- Language: Italian
- Subject: Performing arts
- Genre: Reference encyclopedia
- Publisher: Casa Editrice Le Maschere; Unione Editoriale
- Publication date: 1954-1966
- Publication place: Italy
- Media type: Hardcover; 9 original volumes; 2 supplementary; Index-Directory

The Encyclopedia of Performing Arts (Italian: Enciclopedia dello Spettacolo; sometimes cited as Enciclopedio dello Spettacolo) was an Italian language specialty encyclopedia of performing arts, published between 1954 and 1965. Its first editor was the Italian theatre critic and journalist, Silvio D'Amico. Considered to be the most comprehensive international performing arts encyclopedia, it is included in the reference section of many libraries.

== History ==
The Encyclopedia of Performing Arts was created by two separate projects, one dating to 1945 and the other to 1954.

=== Early version ===
Starting in 1945 or 1946, D'Amico conceived of a project to develop an encyclopedia of the performing arts. Undertaken by an editorial team composed of a few people and led by D'Amico, it was produced in three or four years and contained four volumes. Considered superficial, it was not publishable. However, it developed a model for the scientific study of the theatre and other performing arts.

=== Later version ===
Conceived as a set of 12 volumes, the second project took on an ethnographic approach. It had the advantage of a stable editorial group and used foreign employees. D'Amico's editorial staff worked at the Palazzo Doria Pamphili, Via del Plebiscito 112. The attorney Carlo Minù, D'Amico's brother-in-law, found funding for the second project and referred D'Amico to publishers. In drawing up lists of dramas, operas, ballets and films, the editorial team wondered if it their work was worthwhile or helpful. It was Francesco Savio who sometimes said, "Of course it is; if someone else wants one day to create an Encyclopedia of Performing Arts, they would find these materials to be useful." When the news spread that the encyclopedia was about to be published, a delegation arrived wanting guidance in the organizational work to start up an encyclopedia of Prague theatre.

The structure of the work was better articulated. Responsibility for each section, such as film, music, or theatre, was delegated to an initial small staff that rapidly grew to thirty editors who coordinated over five hundred employees. Large blocks of work were assigned to collaborators, many of them in foreign countries.

D'Amico felt that the second project benefited from finding amateur collectors without whose assistance entire sectors of biographical entries would have been less detailed. Collected material came from abroad or was bought directly in the antique market. An example of a collector was Ulderico Rolandi, a gynaecologist who lived in the Via Veneto, and who had made a hobby of collecting, filing and examining librettos. He had accumulated what was thought to be the largest collection of opera librettos after the Library of Congress. Another example was David Turcotte who had developed a catalog of American cinema.

The project suffered a severe crisis in 1957, two years after the death of D'Amico, due to disagreements between the editorial office and the publisher. The publisher's expectation was to publish two volumes a year, but the editorial staff was only able to put out a single volume each year. Because of this crisis, there is an imbalance between the first volume and the last four whose detail is considered sometimes less accurate.

=== Editions ===
Published between 1954 and 1962, the original nine-volume Enciclopedia dello Spettacolo covers ballet, films, opera, plays, theatre, vaudeville, and other areas of entertainment. They include signed essays that discuss performers, directors, and writers. Other sections discuss genres and themes, as well as history, technical subjects, and bibliographies. The encyclopedia is over 18,000 pages in length and profusely illustrated with thousands of illustrations of which 700 are in the text, 1800 are out of the text, and there are 320 colour plates. The first print run of 10,000 copies was followed by a reprint of 5,000 additional copies. Originally published in Rome by Casa Editrice Le Maschere, reprints were published by UNEDI.

Published in Rome by Unione Editoriale in 1966, the Enciclopedia dello spettacolo. Aggiornamento 1955-1965 ("Encyclopedia of Performing Arts, Supplementary 1955-1965) is an update of the main set. The Aggiornamento addresses developments and biographies.

Published in Rome by Unione Editoriale in 1968, the Enciclopedia dello spettacolo. Indice-repertorio (Encyclopedia of Performing Arts. Index-Directory) is a title index of the 145,000 entries cited in the main set and the supplements. It addresses the author, genre and year of composition.

== Personnel and management ==
D'Amico conceived of the project and brought it to fruition. The theater section was under the direction of Luigi Squarzina; he also did the film section. D'Amico's father worked on the drama theatre section, while his brother Mario worked on the music section. Gabriele Baldini and later Gian Luigi Rondi were responsible for the cinema section. Additional sections were led by others including: classical antiquity by Bruno Gentili, German theater by Paolo Chiarini, Slavic theater by Angelo Maria Ripellino, English theater by Brunacci, French theater by Gian Carlo Roscioni, Iberian theater by Luciana Stegagno Picchio, and Italian theater by Niccolò Gallo, Giulio Cesare Castello, and Caesar Garboli. The Chamber music section was under the direction of D'Amico's son, Fedele D'Amico, a musicologist, with Nino Pirrotta, Franco Serpa and Emilia Zanetti as editors.

Consultants included Sabatino Moscati for Hebrew and Yiddish theater; Dario Puccini for the Iberian language theater; Luigi Salvini for Slavic, Finno-Ugric and Romanian language theater; Giuliano Bertuccioli for Chinese language theater. Almost all of the drawings were made by young, recent graduates. Some of the illustrations were edited by Helen Poveledo. Texts and drafts were reviewed by professors.

== Critical and popular assessments ==
Most libraries found it to be an essential component of their reference section.

The proposed biographies of many lesser figures were not included as the editorial staff were unable to keep up with the publisher's deadline.

Criticisms of the encyclopedia have included the fact that it was only available in the Italian language, that it was Eurocentric, and that non-European theatre and 20th-century theatre were underrepresented. While the encyclopedia was first published in the 1950s, it was based on pre-World War II documentation. By the 1970s, the Encyclopedia of Performing Arts was considered out of date.
