= Seven Seas to Calais =

- US theatrical release poster
- Directed by: Rudolph Maté; Primo Zeglio
- Written by: Lindsay Galloway
- Screenplay by: George St. George; Filippo Sanjust
- Produced by: Paolo Moffa
- Starring: Rod Taylor; Keith Michell; Edy Vessel
- Cinematography: Giulio Gianini
- Edited by: Franco Fraticelli
- Music by: Franco Mannino
- Production company: Adelphia Compagnia Cinematografica
- Distributed by: Metro-Goldwyn-Mayer
- Release date: August 1962 (Italy)
- Running time: 102 minutes
- Country: Italy
- Languages: Italian; English
- Budget: $650,000
- Box office: $2.25 million

Seven Seas to Calais (Italian: Il dominatore dei sette mari) is a 1962 Italian adventure film in Eastmancolor and CinemaScope, produced by Paolo Moffa, directed by Rudolph Maté (his final film) and Primo Zeglio, that stars Rod Taylor, Keith Michell, and Edy Vessel. The film depicts the career of Britain's Sir Francis Drake.

== Plot ==
Francis Drake (Rod Taylor) is one of the leading naval commanders under Queen Elizabeth I of England (Irene Worth). A veteran privateer, master strategist and skilled diplomat, he excels at disrupting Spanish shipping and taking New World gold back to England, defying the Spanish Armada. Elizabeth publicly denounces him as a pirate, but secretly supplies him support and protection.

King Phillip of Spain (Umberto Raho) is not fooled. He refuses to countenance a plot by his advisers to assassinate Elizabeth and place Mary Stuart (Esmeralda Ruspoli) on the throne, removing Drake’s support and leaving him vulnerable. However, Phillip does nothing to stop them from proceeding with the plan.

Drake, freshly knighted for his secret services to the Crown, foils the plot but is unable stop Elizabeth from having Mary executed for her alleged involvement in the attempted coup. Spain is outraged, and the Armada threatens England. Drake’s spies track the Spanish fleet as Drake looks for an opportunity to cripple the Armada before they can invade Britain.

== Cast ==
=== Main ===
- Rod Taylor as Sir Francis Drake
- Keith Michell as Malcolm Marsh
- Edy Vessel as Arabella Ducleau
- Terence Hill as Babington (Credited as Mario Girotti)
- Basil Dignam as Sir Francis Walsingham
- Anthony Dawson as Lord Burleigh
- Gianni Cajafa as Tom Moon
- Irene Worth as Queen Elizabeth I
- Arturo Dominici as Don Bernardino de Mendoza, the Spanish Ambassador
- Marco Guglielmi as Fletcher
- Esmeralda Ruspoli as Mary of Scotland
- Rossella D'Aquino as Potato
- Umberto Raho as King Philip of Spain
- Aldo Bufi Landi as Vigeois

=== Uncredited roles ===
- Giuseppe Abbrescia as Chester
- Luciana Gilli as Indian Wife
- Massimo Righi as Lord of the Royal Court
- Anna Santarsiero as Indian Wife
- Gianni Solaro as Admiral Medina Sedonia
- Jacopo TecchivGarcia
- Bruno Ukmar as Emmanuel
- Franco Ukmar as Francisco
- Adriano Vitale as Recalde

== Production ==
The film was mainly shot at the Titanus Appia Studios in Rome, but some scenes were filmed at the Bay of Naples. While filming, Rod Taylor was dating Anita Ekberg.

== Reception ==
According to MGM records, the film earned $1,250,000 in North America and $1,000,000 in other markets, earning it a profit of $293,000.

It had admissions of 534,906 in France.

== Biography ==
- Hughes, Howard (2011). Cinema Italiano - The Complete Guide from Classics to Cult. London - New York: I.B.Tauris. ISBN 978-1-84885-608-0.
