= Nest of Vipers =

- Cover for the 2012 DVD release
- Directed by: Tonino Cervi
- Cinematography: Armando Nannuzzi
- Edited by: Nino Baragli
- Music by: Vince Tempera
- Production company: Mars Film
- Distributed by: Cinema International Corporation
- Release date: 1978
- Country: Italy
- Language: Italian
- Box office: $27,182 (US)

Nest of Vipers (Italian: Ritratto di borghesia in nero, lit. 'Portrait of the Bourgeoisie in Black') is a 1978 Italian drama film directed by Tonino Cervi. Based on the 1949 short story La maîtresse de piano (The Piano Teacher) by Roger Peyrefitte and set in Venice under fascism, its themes include illicit sex, betrayal, revenge, blackmail, perjury, police corruption and murder.

== Plot ==
In Venice in the 1930s, Mattia, a young man of modest background, arrives to take up a piano scholarship at the conservatory. He makes friends with another student, Renato, whose vivacious widowed mother, Carla, is short of money and survives by giving piano lessons. Mattia and Carla start a passionate affair in secret. However Renato, who is unhealthily close to his mother, gets suspicious and Mattia breaks it off abruptly. Carla is deeply hurt at this betrayal and nurses a desire for revenge.

Her plan for Renato is to marry him to one of her students, Elena, daughter of a rich family, and she arranges a dinner party for Elena and her brother. Renato invites Mattia as well, with the result that Elena and Mattia are instantly attracted to each other. Mattia walks back with Elena and her brother to the palazzo they live in as a ferocious storm breaks out. Invited to stay the night in a spare room and lent a pair of pyjamas, he and Elena are able to start a secret physical relationship. Accepted by the family, soon the two are engaged.

In revenge, Carla sends an anonymous letter to Elena's parents, but Mattia recognises her writing and the result is they ban her from giving Elena further lessons. Carla begs Elena to come to her flat for an explanation and, when she turns up, seduces her. Afterwards, as Elena is lying happily in bed, Carla brutally says that the sex was just to discredit her and will be publicised unless the engagement is broken. Horrified, Elena strikes at her until she falls dead. The police suspect Mattia, who has not got a good alibi, until Elena saves him by claiming she was in his room with him at the time of the killing. Her father helps by saying he will find a good job for the police commissioner's son if Elena's confession is kept quiet. So Mattia has to marry a perjurer and a murderess and, as they emerge from the church, a gondola goes past carrying only a coffin.

== Cast ==
- Senta Berger: Carla Richter
- Ornella Muti: Elena Mazzarini
- Mattia Sbragia: Edoardo Mazzarini
- Stefano Patrizi: Mattia Morandi
- Capucine: Amalia Mazzarini
- Paolo Bonacelli: Riccardo Mazzarini
- Giuliana Calandra: Conservatory teacher
- Giancarlo Sbragia: Maffei, the patriarch
- Maria Monti: Linda
- Eros Pagni: Police Commissioner
- Christian Borromeo: Renato Richter

== Release ==
The film, which has an 18 rating, was released on DVD in 2012.
