= Himetop =

Himetop – The History of Medicine Topographical Database
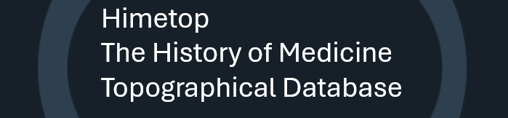
- Logo
- Website type: Collaborative database
- Available in: English
- Owners: Università Campus Bio-Medico of Rome, Italy
- Creator: Luca Borghi
- Website: https://himetop.unicampus.it/
- Registration: Optional
- Launched: December 22, 2007; 18 years ago
- Current status: Active
- Content license: CC BY-SA 3.0

Himetop - The History of Medicine Topographical Database is a collaborative online open access database written in English and launched on December 22, 2007. It is a material culture project run by Italian academician and historian of medicine Luca Borghi at Università Campus Bio-Medico of Rome, Italy. Currently, the database has more than 5.000 records of all kinds of monuments, objects and places related to the history of medicine and others health-related topics. The database currently features items from about 40 countries.

The database contains (2025) items relating to about 1,400 people, mostly physicians and nurses of historical interest, but also health officers, hospital founders and scientists from different fields. Each country where Himetop project is developing has a dedicated Google Map to easily locate each item described in the database records.

The name Himetop is an acronym (HIstory of MEdicine TOPographical database) and is inspired by Imhotep, the Egyptian "Father of Medicine" (c. 2686-30 B.C.E.).

== Bibliography ==
- Jessica Casaccia, How can a dusty bust of Louis Pasteur be useful? Material medical culture as a new asset for the History of Medicine, PhD Thesis, Università Campus Bio-Medico, Rome 2024
- Sofia Fagiolo, "Himetop: The History of Medicine Topographical Database", The Charleston Advisor, Volume 22, Number 4, 1 April 2021, pp. 40–44(5)
- Sofia Fagiolo, “Promoting the history of medicine through special collections: the experience of Campus Bio-Medico University Library (Rome, Italy)”, Journal of EAHIL 2021; Vol. 17 (3): 29–31 doi:10.32384/jeahil17463
- "Himetop: the history of medicine topographical database", Medical History 2009;53:127-30
