= Silvio D'Amico =

Italian journalist and theatre critic

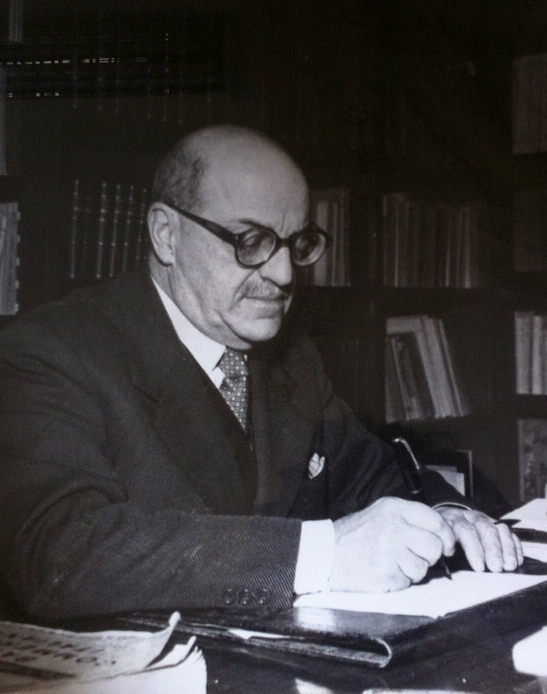
- Born: 3 February 1887; Rome, Kingdom of Italy
- Died: 1 April 1955 (aged 68); Rome, Italy
- Occupations: Theatre critic; journalist; theorist of Italian theater
- Children: 2

Silvio D'Amico (3 February 1887 – 1 April 1955) was an Italian theatre critic, journalist, and theorist of Italian theatre. Not a Fascist himself, D'Amico was the major theatre critic during the ventennio, i.e. the twenty years (1922–1945) of Fascist rule in Italy. He was the first editor of the nine-volume Enciclopedia dello Spettacolo (Encyclopedia of Performing Arts), published between 1954 and 1965, that covered theatre, music, cinema, and dance. Most notably, he held an eminent position in theatrical study in Italy, giving his name to the Silvio D'Amico National Academy of Dramatic Art in Rome, Italy's most prestigious drama school.

== Biography ==
"What mass theater could be more authentic than that of the people gathered in Piazza Venezia, when Mussolini speaks from his balcony?"

— S. D'Amico, Volta Conference, 1934.

A Catholic, D'Amico was educated by Jesuits at Rome's Massimiliano Massimo Institute. After graduating in law in 1911, he was appointed to the Ministry of Education as the Directorate General for Antiquities and Fine Arts. In 1923, he became a professor of theatre history at the Royal School of Acting "Eleonora Duse." He met Duse when he was young and ambitious, a time when D'Amico wanted to create an Italian national theatre that produced works of young Italian playwrights.

Between 1925 and 1940, he directed dramatic criticism in the La Tribune newspaper. With Nicola De Pirro, he founded the magazine Scenario in 1932. They directed it together for three years, after which De Pirro continued alone. In 1934, he was appointed Special Commissioner for the reform of the drama school in Rome. The following year, he became the head of the Accademia Nazionale di Arte Drammatica Silvio D'Amico which, since the 1940s, has taught many of Italy's most successful actors. In the years after World War II, he devoted most of his time to the academy.

From 1937 to 1943, he directed the Rivista italiana del Dramma, published by the Società Italiana degli Autori ed Editori. From 1945 to 1955, he was the critic of Il Tempo. He was a major contributor to the Teatro del Novecento encyclopedia, contributing to 11 of its volumes.

D'Amico championed the works of the Italian dramatist, novelist, and short story writer Luigi Pirandello. In turn, Pirandello spoke of D'Amico as "the priest".

== Personal life ==
He had at least two children. A son, Fedele D'Amico (nickname: Lele), who was a musicologist, married the Italian screenwriter, Suso Cecchi d'Amico, in 1938. Another son, Alessandro d'Amico, married Pirandello's granddaughter, Maria Luisa Aguirre.

D'Amico's brother, Mario, worked on the Enciclopedia with him.

He died in Rome in April 1955. At the news of his death, the theatres of the capital remained closed for mourning.

== Sources ==
- Berghaus, Günter (1996). Fascism and theatre: comparative studies on the aesthetics and politics of performance in Europe, 1925-1945. Berghahn Books. ISBN 1-57181-877-4.
- Witt, Mary Ann Frese (2001). The search for modern tragedy: aesthetic fascism in Italy and France. Cornell University Press. ISBN 0801438373.
