= Vittorio Di Prima =

Italian voice actor (1941–2016)

- Born: 19 July 1941; Palermo, Italy
- Died: 9 February 2016 (aged 74); Rome, Italy
- Occupations: Actor; voice actor; dubbing director
- Years active: 1973–2016
- Spouse: Ada Maria Serra Zanetti

Vittorio Di Prima (19 July 1941 – 9 February 2016) was an Italian actor and voice actor.

== Biography ==
Born in Palermo, Di Prima began his career as an actor at some point during the early 1970s. He has acted in two films and appeared in several television shows but he was more known to the Italian public as a voice dubbing artist. He dubbed over the voices of Anthony Quinn, Leonard Nimoy, Morgan Freeman, Philippe Noiret, Carl Weathers, Jerry Stiller and Delroy Lindo in most of or some of their movies.

In animation, Di Prima provided the Italian voice of Henry J. Waternoose in Monsters, Inc., Sheriff in Cars, he also dubbed Animal in The Muppets and Muppets Most Wanted until he was replaced by Paolo Marchese in 2015 and Pete from 1984 to 1988.

=== Personal life ===
Di Prima was married to Ada Maria Serra Zanetti, who is also a voice actress.

== Death ==
Di Prima died in Rome on 9 February 2016, at the age of 74.

== Filmography ==
- E le stelle stanno a guardare - TV miniseries (1971)
- Primo tango a Roma - Storia d'amore e d'alchimia (1973)
- La Pimpa - Animated TV series (1982) - Armando (voice)
- La piovra - TV series, season 7 (1995) - Livoti
- RDF - Rumori di fondo (1996) - Police station director
- Primo cittadino - TV series (1998) - Lanti
- I Magotti e la pentola magica - Animated film (2001) - Narrator (voice)
- Spike Team - animated TV series (2010-2014) - Luther (voice)

=== Dubbing roles ===
==== Animation ====
- Henry J. Waternoose III in Monsters, Inc.
- Sheriff in Cars
- Animal in The Muppets, Muppets Most Wanted
- Foghorn Leghorn and Taz in the first It Dub of Bugs Bunny's Looney Tunes Christmas Tales
- Sam the Eagle in The Muppet Show
- Sneezy / The Huntsman in Snow White and the Seven Dwarfs (1972 redub)
- Hugo in Barbie as Rapunzel
- Erasmus in Barbie of Swan Lake
- Ted Bedderhead in The Country Bears

==== Live action ====
- Azeem Edin Bashir Al Bakir in Robin Hood: Prince of Thieves
- God in Evan Almighty
- Jack Doyle in Gone Baby Gone
- Frank Carden in The Contract
- Joe Matheson in Red
- Spock in Star Trek: The Motion Picture, Star Trek II: The Wrath of Khan, Star Trek IV: The Voyage Home
- Deaf Smith in Deaf Smith & Johnny Ears
- Angelo Allieghieri in Avenging Angelo
- Maury Ballstein in Zoolander
- Apollo Creed in Rocky II, Rocky III
- Dr. Richard Thorndyke in High Anxiety
- Rufus in Kill Bill: Volume 2
- Julius Levinson in Independence Day
- Zeus in Hercules: The Legendary Journeys
- Leonard Dillon in Alien 3
- Salvatore Fiore in The Wedding Planner
- John Seward in Dracula: Dead and Loving It
- Grandpa George in Charlie and the Chocolate Factory
- Matt "Guitar" Murphy in The Blues Brothers
- Bo Catlett in Get Shorty
- Vito Graziosi in Mickey Blue Eyes
- Marion "Mr. Sir" Sevillo in Holes
- Lonnie Hawkins in Ransom
- Max in The Score
