= Mattia Sbragia =

Italian character actor (born 1952)

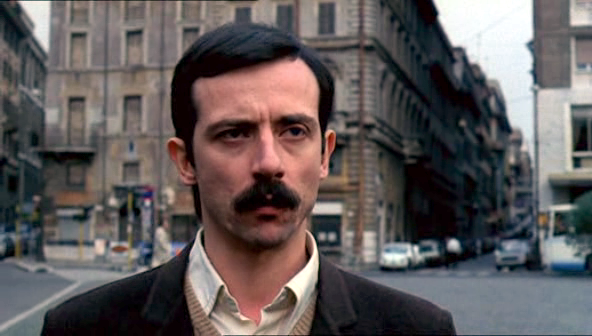
- Sbragia in The Moro Affair (1986)
- Born: 17 April 1952 (age 73); Rome, Italy
- Height: 1.74 m (5 ft 9 in)
- Spouse(s): Alinda Sbragia (m. ??)
- Parent(s): Giancarlo Sbragia; Princess Esmeralda Ruspoli

Mattia Sbragia (born 17 April 1952) is an Italian character actor.

The son of the actor and stage director Giancarlo Sbragia and the actress Princess Esmeralda Ruspoli.

He made his motion picture debut in 1974, in Franco Rossetti's Nipoti Miei Diletti (1974). In Italy, he has appeared in Tonino Cervi's Nest of Vipers (1977), Mauro Bolognini's La Dame Aux Camelias (1981), Giuseppe Ferrara's The Moro Affair (1986), and Pupi Avati's Storia di ragazzi e di ragazze (1989), amongst others. He has also acted often in international productions, including John Frankenheimer's The Year of the Gun (1991), Norman Jewison's Only You (1994), and James Ivory's The Golden Bowl (1999). Sbragia's more recent film appearances have been in Ricky Tognazzi's Canone inverso (2000), Paul Tickell's Christie Malry's Own Double Entry (2000), Tom Tykwer's Heaven (2001) and Brian Helgeland's The Order (2003).

Sbragia has also appeared frequently on television, in productions such as Damiano Damiani's Lenin: The Train (1990) and Josee Dayan's 1998 version of The Count of Monte Cristo. As of 2023, his most recent television work was a recurring role in the 2022 Italian crime drama series Bang Bang Baby.

On stage, he has had major roles in productions of The Tempest, Orestes, Faust, and The Iliad. He is also a noted theater director who has staged successful Roman productions of Madame Bovary, Padrone Del Mondo, La Poltrona, and Ore Rubate. He is best known for his role as Caiaphas in The Passion of the Christ (2004).
