= The Adolescents (1964 film) =

- French: La fleur de l'âge
- Italian: Le adolescenti
- Japanese: Shishunki
- Directed by: Gian Vittorio Baldi; Michel Brault; Jean Rouch; Hiroshi Teshigahara
- Written by: Gian Vittorio Baldi; Alec Pelletier; Kōbō Abe
- Produced by: Gian Vittorio Baldi; André Belleau; Pierre Braunberger; Victor Jobin; Luigi Piredda; Shigeru Wakatsuki
- Starring: Micaela Esdra; Esmeralda Ruspoli; Geneviève Bujold; Louise Marleau; Bernard Arcand
- Cinematography: Camillo Bazzoni; Georges Dufaux; Jacques Lang
- Edited by: Claudine Bouché; Domenico Gorgolini; Werner Nold
- Music by: Maurice Blackburn; Tôru Takemitsu; Ivan Vandor
- Production companies: Bungei Production; IDA Cinematografica; Les Films de la Pléiade; National Film Board of Canada
- Release date: August 31, 1964 (Venice)
- Running time: 80 minutes
- Countries: Canada; France; Italy; Japan
- Languages: French; Italian; Japanese

The Adolescents (French: La Fleur de l'âge, Italian: Le adolescenti, Japanese: Shishunki), also known as That Tender Age or Flower of Youth, is a drama anthology film, released in 1964. A coproduction of companies from Canada, France, Italy and Japan, the film consists of four short films, each by a director from one of the participating countries, about youth.

== Films ==
=== Fiammetta ===
Directed by Gian Vittorio Baldi, Fiammetta stars Micaela Esdra as Fiammetta, a teenage girl whose grief over the death of her father turns into jealousy of her mother (Esmeralda Ruspoli).

=== Geneviève ===
Directed by Michel Brault, Geneviève stars Geneviève Bujold and Louise Marleau as Geneviève and Louise, two 17-year-old friends who travel together to the Quebec Winter Carnival in Quebec City, but whose friendship is tested when they become rivals for the affections of Bernard (Bernard Arcand), an attractive young man they meet in the city.

=== Marie-France et Véronique ===
Directed by Jean Rouch, Marie-France et Véronique is a documentary short centered on Marie-France de Chabaneix and Véronique Duval, teenage girls from affluent families in Paris who gradually come to realize that they are mismatched as friends.

The film was later separately released under the title The Fifteen-Year-Old Widows (Les veuves de quinze ans).

=== Ako/White Morning ===
Directed by Hiroshi Teshigahara, Ako centres on youth workers in a bakery in Tokyo, and their conflicts with the traditional values of their elders.

This segment was cut from the film in some markets due to time constraints.

== Production ==
The original concept was devised by the National Film Board of Canada, and presented to French, Italian and Japanese producers at the 1963 Montreal International Film Festival.

All four of the films have also been separately screened on their own as standalone short films.
