= Roberto Pacini =

Personal details
- Born: Florence, Italy
- Occupation: Director, Author, Producer
- Profession: Producer

Roberto Pacini (born 1967 in Florence, Italy) is an Italian director, author and theatre and film producer.

== Biography ==
He lives and works in Rome. In 1987, he attended the Bottega Teatrale di Firenze (Florentine Theatre School) directed by Vittorio Gassman. In 1993, he was awarded a degree in Drama and Performing Arts at the Silvio D'Amico National Academy of Dramatic Art, the most important Italian performing arts institute for theatre directors and actors.

=== Theatre ===
He made his debut as director in 1994 and since 1996 he has been a theatre playwright and director. The range of his performances belongs to the so-called Word Theatre; he developed its qualities creating drama compositions that already determine interpretation key and the work on the Text and on the Actors is essential.

In years, he carries out in his own working method and style, visionary and grotesque, and his research gives unusual reading of classic works (Anton Chekhov, Kafka, Pirandello, Shakespeare) and contemporary authors. Performances, usually located in spaces not appointed to theatre presentations, go beyond the realism dimension and they offer fantastic suggestions, irrational, with strong expressionistic tints. Original soundtracks – by musicians and bands – are always composed for every show.

Among the significant titles: La Locanda Hauser (Hauser Inn) (1995), from Maupassant's tales, L'Ospedale dei Mentecatti (Hospital for the Insane People) (1996), from A Portrait of the Artist as a Young Man by Joyce, and The Night just before the Forests (2000) by Bernard-Marie Koltès, the first time on national stages in an unabridged edition. By Koltès, he also realized the first Italian version of Heritage (2002).

In 2003, he has been nominated Artistic Director of CTD theatre company of Rome and produced Classic Works (Aeschylus, Shakespeare, Herman Melville) and Italian and International New Writing Works. He has founded and directed Cadmo & Armonia theatre company (1994) and afterwards Il Teatro di Puck (Puck's Theatre) (1998).

=== Film ===
Since 2001, he has been also a movie author and producer. In 35 mm and 16 mm production, he cooperated in Italian feature film productions and International co productions, as Producer, Executive Producer and Consulting Producer.

Personal projects (Dv, Betacam), produced by Cinepuck, are influenced by his theatrical origins and then they gain surreal and metaphysical dimension, even thanks to old format Super 8 experimentations. In 2001 he produced and directed his first short film Dal Diario di un Aiuto Contabile (The Diary of an Assistant Bookkeeper), a man and his daily war at work, from Chekhov 's classic tales, presented at Arcipelago International Festival of Short Film and New Images. Among Super 8 works, Mr Filipponi (2009), the true story of a poet who misses his poems, and Balloon (2010), a man lost in his thought.

Sunlight (2006), institutional spot celebrating the 50th anniversary of Treaty of Rome (Prix Europa 2006, Berlin), Being Fed Up (2007), spot against discrimination to women for public service broadcasting, produced by Unesco (Paris), For Instance (2009), for the World Food Programme fighting hunger worldwide.

In 2010, he produced and directed Dreams & Colors, visionary documentary about Piazza Navona in Rome, and Gaussian Copula Function based on Felix Salmon's article published by Wired about the disaster of Wall Street (2008). In 2012, The Man Wearing a Hood, a tribute to Rod Serling and The Twilight Zone, and The Empty Chair, for the United Nations Population Fund, music by Moby.

In 2017 FPM, about some Italian Life imprisonment convicted persons, and in 2018 The Enthusiasm of a Child, the story of "a remained young at heart 75 years old man who his face lightens, like a boy, when he speaks about his recycled bricks” for Circular Economy Stories, an Ecodom project sponsored by Banca Popolare Etica (the most important Italian Ethical banking institution) among others.

About the Brexit, he produces Not a Good Idea (2019) for Brexit Feelings International project and 13 years later on the occasion of the 2019 European Parliament election, music by Nine Inch Nails, the 2006 Sunlight extended version. In 2020 Or Other originally produced for the World Health Organization HealthForAll Film Festival and in 2021 The Dusk "most set in the Twilight, the time period between astronomical sunset and dusk”. In 2022 His Choice for the third edition of HealthForAll Film Festival.

=== Creative Commons ===
Licensed under the Creative Commons, he produced and directed The Briefcase (2011), about the 2008 financial crisis, Animals/Man (2011), a new spot for Public Service Broadcasting, Time (2013) against Death Penalty worldwide, The Diary of an Assistant Bookkeeper (2012–2013), a mini-web series from the original tale by Anton Chekhov, English version of his first short film with new footage, a new editing and music by Nine Inch Nails, and Shapes (2013) on the occasion of the 70th anniversary of Bombing of Rome in World War II.

In 2015, direction of Exit an experimental video work presented as "The old and the new, on leaving", music by Chris Zabriskie, American artist he too inspired by Creative Commons and the open source movement. In 2019 he produced Sintuit, "a 2064 television advertisement" but, in fact, a present-day video about the Global warming and in 2020 The Mall, a COVID-19 pandemic experience: “What IF?”.

== Late works ==
Among his late works, Frags (2025), a Super 8 mm work based on a quote by Malala Yousafzai, A Halloween story (2025), a tribute to Ed Wood, Fractal Wrongness (2024) on Critical Thinking from the RationalWiki entry of the same name and The Seven (2023) licensed under the Creative Commons.

== Selected works ==
- At the Night Cafè (1993)
- Hauser Inn (1994–1997)
- Chekhov from Chekhov (1995)
- Hospital for the Insane People (1996)
- Mr Agenore and Mr Bordon (1997)
- The Night just before the Forests (1999)
- The Alchemist of Mantua (2000)
- The Winter's Tale (2000)
- From an Under Accountant diary (2001)
- Sunlight (2006)
- Being Fed Up (2007)
- Mr Filipponi (2009)
- Dreams & Colors (2010)
- The Briefcase (2011)
- The Empty Chair (2012)
- Time (2013)
- Shapes (2013)
- Exit (2015)
- FPM (2017)
- The Enthusiasm of a Child (2018)
- 13 Years later (2019)
- The Mall (2020)
- The Dusk (2021)
- His Choice (2022)
- The Seven (2023)
- Fractal Wrongness (2024)
- Frags (2025)

== See also ==
- Bernard-Marie Koltès
- William Shakespeare
- Anton Chekhov
- Guy de Maupassant
- James Joyce
- Edgar Allan Poe
- Herman Melville
- Rod Serling
- Creative Commons
