= Dirk van den Berg =

German film director and producer

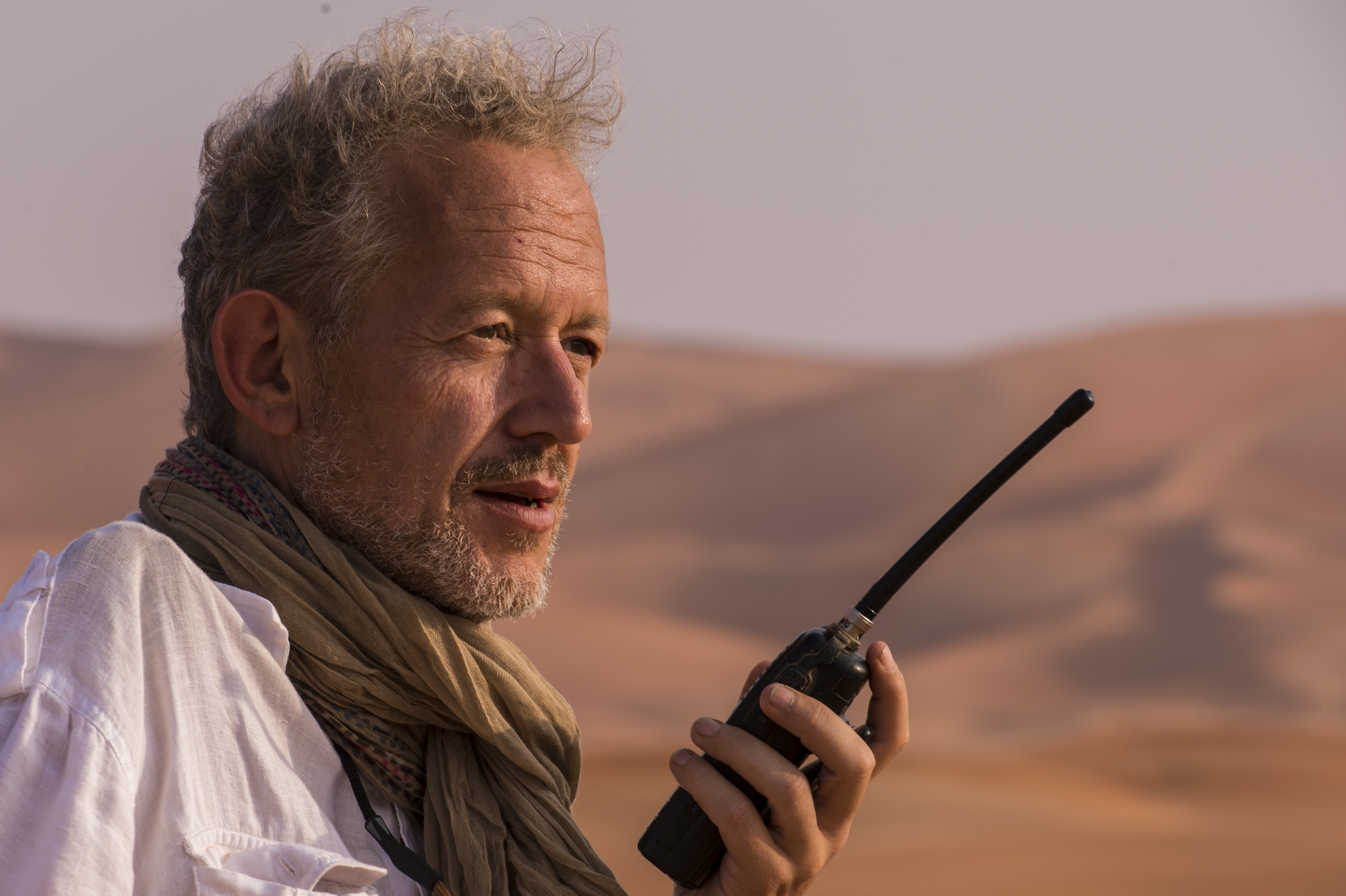
Dirk van den Berg in 2013

Dirk van den Berg (born May 10, 1966, in Düsseldorf) is a German film director and producer known for creative documentaries about geopolitics and urgent issues of our contemporary world.

== Biography ==
For almost 25 years, Dirk lived in Rome, Italy where he graduated at the National Academy of Film and Drama, and at Rome University in Media Sciences. Connecting music and drama, he worked as an opera director, started directing and writing feature films, television and documentaries. At the same time, he participated in a growing number of international films as a line-, associate- and executive producer.

Dirk's 2019 international feature "1979 BIG BANG OF THE PRESENT" is roller-coaster documentary about the pivotal events and protagonists that in 1979 gave birth to our present time. The film was co-produced by Dirk's OUTREMER FILM and Pascal Verroust's Paris-based K2 PRODUCTIONS, and co-financed by ARTE, RBB, TVP Poland, ORF and NRK. It is already distributed in more than two dozen countries by Cologne-based world-sales NEW DOCS.

In 2018 Dirk achieved his international breakthrough as a director of geopolitical documentaries with the critically acclaimed investigative documentary The Siege of Mecca. Five years in the making, the film explores one of the most consequential and sensitive events in modern Saudi history: the 1979 seizure of the Grand Mosque in Mecca, Islam's holiest site. Produced by OUTREMER FILM and K2-PRODUCTIONS, the film was supported by ARTE France, NDR, WDR, HR, RBB, ORF, FFHSH Hamburg Film Fund, and INA France. PBS International handles worldwide sales.

Since then, together with his French partner-in-crime Pascal Verroust, Dirk directed and produced Silent War (aka Im Schatten der Bombe, 2025, ZDF), about the victims of more than 2,000 nuclear tests conducted after 1945; Against The Clock (aka Doomsday Clock, 2023, arte, RBB, TVP, RTS and others), about the greatest threats to humanity at the focus of the “Bulletin of the Atomic Scientists” founded by Einstein and Oppenheimer; and before that, 1979 - Big Bang of the Present (2019, arte, RBB, ORF, RTS and others), about the year that marked the beginning of our era.

During the pandemic he created Decameron 2020 by connecting the 1348 plague described by Giovanni Boccaccio in the little-known prologue to his famous collection of short stories The Decameron, with the present poisoned and paralyzed by Covid-19. The film earned international acclaim also for the music score by Austrian composer Johanna Doderer. Prior to this, he directed and produced numerous music and travel documentaries such as: "JAMMING ADDIS", "GUZO - THE ORIGIN OF MUSIC", and "KASHMIR - INDIA'S CROWN JEWEL".

== Filmography (selection) ==
- Silent War (2025), co-director (with Pascal Verroust) & producer
- Against the Clock (2023), co-director & coproducer (with Pascal Verroust)
- Decameron 2020 (2021), director & producer
- 1979 Big Bang of the Present (2019), co-director & coproducer (with Pascal Verroust)
- The Siege of Mecca (2018), director & coproducer
- Jamming Addis (2013), director & producer
- The Last Princess of Mir (2012), director & coproducer
- My Daughter Anne Frank (2014), line producer, director: Raymond Ley
- The Great War Diary (2013), creative producer, 4/8x52' internationally co-produced series

== Awards ==
- 1993 Best European Screenplay for the Script "OutreMer"
