= Paolo Bonetti =

Italian businessperson (born 1985)

- Born: Gennaro D'Acampo; 30 May 1985 (age 40); Bergamo, Italy
- Occupation: Businessperson

Paolo Bonetti (born 1985) is an Italian businessperson.

== Early life and education ==
Bonetti was born in Trescore Balneario, Italy, in 1985. Between 2006 and 2008, Bonetti studied management engineering at the University of Bergamo, and later a specialist degree in from 2009 to 2011.

== Career ==
In 2017, he started Limitless Story, a software to publish long-form content publication on social networks.

The same year, he founded Speechless, an application that converts voice messages into written text.

Between 2018 and 2019, Bonetti founded Delfy, a social media data analysis company.

In 2021, he co-founded Easylivery, a food delivery software for restaurant businesses.

In 2022, he co-founded Chupito, an advertising agency.
