= Università Campus Bio-Medico di Roma =

University in Italy

Coordinates: 41.769°N 12.470°E

- Università Campus Bio-Medico di Roma
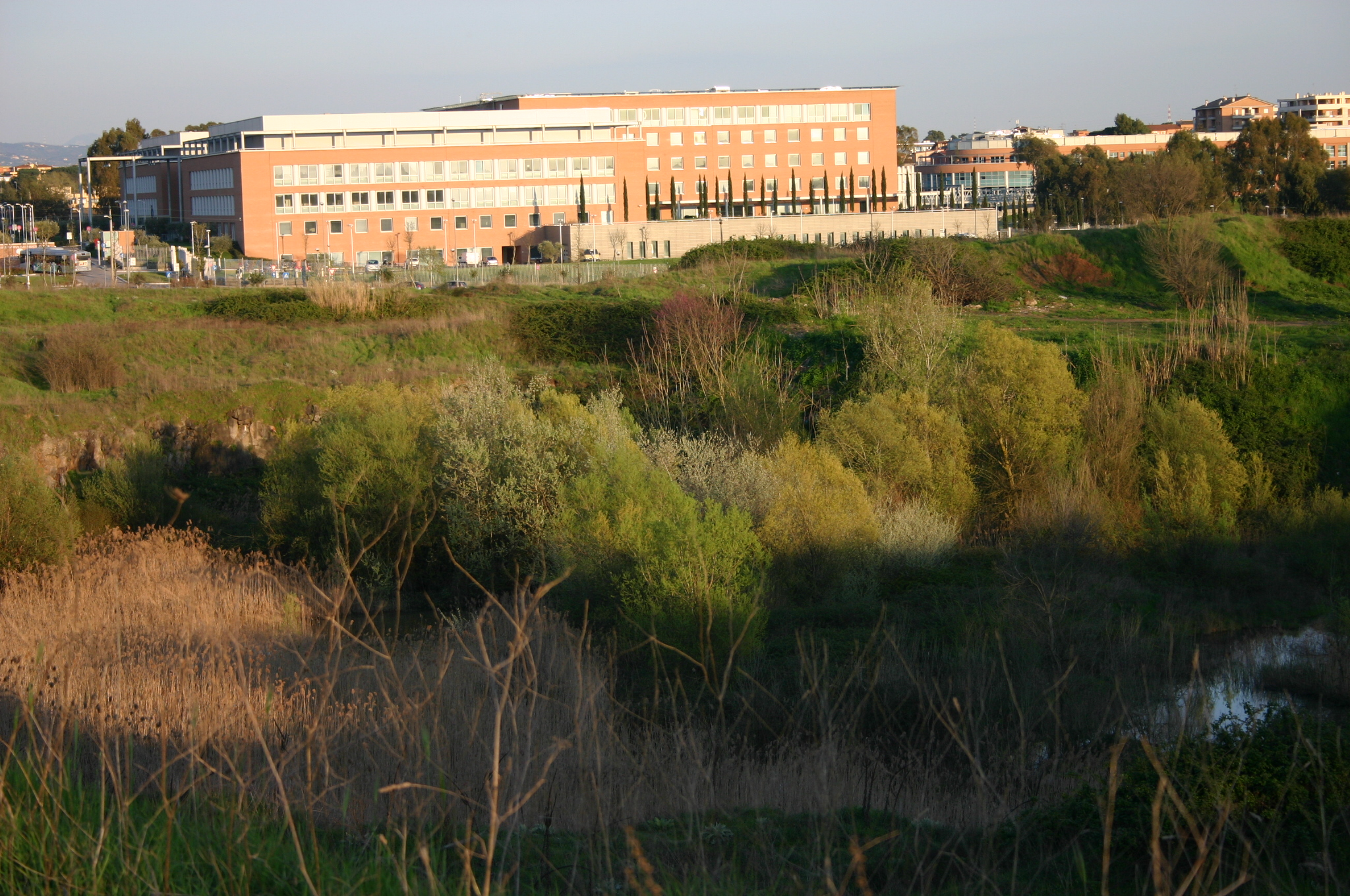
- Università Campus Bio-Medico di Roma campus
- Type: Private
- Established: 1993
- Religious affiliation: Catholic Church
- President: Carlo Tosti
- Rector: Eugenio Guglielmolli
- Students: 2,666
- Location: Rome, Italy
- Website: www.unicampus.it/en/

Università Campus Bio-Medico di Roma is a private Catholic university based in Rome, Italy. It was established in 1993 and promoted by Opus Dei.

== History ==
In 1988, Monsignor Álvaro del Portillo suggested to some professionals and professors the promotion of a university clinic in Rome, which would offer solutions to the reality of pain and illness, drawing on the Christian spirit of service.

In the same year, a first working group was created, called "the Think Tank", with the aim of giving a concrete response to Don Álvaro's suggestion, designing a reality of excellence and capable of lasting over time and in 1990 the Campus Bio-Medico Association and Campus Bio-Medico Spa were established, the promoters of the university. From the beginning, the new university counted on the support of the well-known surgeon and transplant specialist Raffaello Cortesini who became the first president of the Campus Bio-Medico Association.

In October 1993, the degree courses in nursing and medicine and surgery began in the temporary headquarters on Via Emilio Longoni. In 1994, the university hospital was inaugurated, followed by the laboratories for biomedical research. In 1999, the faculty of engineering was born, with the degree course in biomedical engineering. In 2001, the specialization schools of the faculty of medicine and surgery were established.

In 2008, the new university campus in Trigoria was inaugurated, including the new university hospital and the Advanced Research Center in Biomedicine and Bioengineering (PRABB), which were built next to the Center for the Health of the Elderly (CESA), which had already existed since 2001.

== Campus ==
At the beginning of 2008, the new university campus was inaugurated in Trigoria on land partly sold and partly donated by Alberto Sordi, on the edge of the Regional Park of Decima-Malafede. University buildings are gradually being built on this land.

=== Center for Elderly Health - CESA ===
The Centre for the Health of the Elderly (CESA), inaugurated in 2001, stands on approximately eight hectares of land donated by Alberto Sordi to the Campus Bio-Medico University for the creation of a structure dedicated to "medical assistance and research applied to pathologies of the elderly". The CESA, in addition to its assistance and research activities, hosts the Alberto Sordi Foundation and the Alberto Sordi Onlus Association which promotes an innovative Day Centre for Frail Elderly.

=== Advanced Research Center in Biomedicine and Bioengineering ===
This building, inaugurated in 2007 and destined in the future to house almost exclusively research laboratories, currently also houses some classrooms, the presidency, the rectorate, the secretariats for students and specialists, the university canteen and some administrative offices. It also has a chapel dedicated to the Holy Spirit, with sculptures by the Irish artist Dony MacManus and stained glass windows by the Italian artist Paola Grossi Gondi. It is also home to the Institute of Philosophy of Scientific and Technological Action (FAST), an interdisciplinary teaching and research structure which, in addition to coordinating the teaching of the humanities within the various degree courses of the university, has the aim of promoting a constant "dialogue between philosophers, researchers and teachers of the different scientific disciplines".

== Structure ==
The university is organized into three departmental faculties: Medicine and Surgery, Engineering, and Science and Technology for Man and the Environment.

== University hospital ==
The Campus Bio-Medico university hospital has an agreement with the National Health Service of Italy. The facility is equipped with over thirty operating inits. It provides healthcare in agreement with the National Health Service. It includes outpatient services, day-hospital, day-surgery and hospitalisation departments organised by intensity of care.

== Presidents ==
- Umberto Zanni (1993–2001)
- Paolo Arullani (2001–2013)
- Felice Barela (2013–2021)
- Carlo Tosti (2022-current)

== Rectors ==
- Pietro Bucci (1993–1994)
- Giulio Marinozzi (1995–1997)
- Vincenzo Lorenzelli (1998–2013)
- Andrea Onetti Muda (2013–2017)
- Raffaele Calabrò (2017–2022)
- Eugenio Guglielmelli (2022-2025)
- Rocco Papalia (2025-current)

== Research ==
Campus Bio-Medico participated with a project focused on the relationship between serotonin and autism, obtaining the first European funds for research. In September 1944, the first scientific research work was published in Rome in the "Proceedings of the VII National Congress of Medical Informatics".

Another milestone was reached with the inauguration of the Anatomy Laboratory for the study of organ microcirculation, directed by Professor Giulio Marinozzi: in this laboratory, many students had the opportunity to practice thanks to the hours of training that were part of their curricula.

In January 1996 there was the first research competition of the Free University Institute Campus Bio-Medico in which a place was announced for research in the field of Human Anatomy. The competition was won by Sergio Morini.

In the same 1996, the research began to expand and other laboratories were opened, such as the one of hemodynamics directed by Germano Di Sciascio, and the university began to host seminars that had the theme of scientific progress at the centre. At the same time, alongside the Faculties of Medicine and Surgery and Nursing Sciences, the Degree Course in Engineering was being born, which would give a big boost to research activities to the birth of the Interdisciplinary Research Center (CIR) in 2000.

== Rankings ==
The Università Campus Bio-Medico di Roma ranks at 18th place among the 56 Italian universities present in the Times Higher Education ranking. It's ranked #401-500 by Times Higher Education in overall world university rankings.

== Publications ==
From 1993 to 2020, University Campus Bio-Medico published MEDIC - New Series. Teaching Methodology and Clinical Innovation. This international journal, with contributions in Italian and English, described itself as distinguishing itself “for its global and unified approach to bioethics and to health care ethics issues as well as to the training of health workers aiming at structuring the humanistic knowledge and the biomedical sciences into a common vision”.

== Controversies ==
In 2020, the Campus, particularly its School of Specialization in Obstetrics and Gynecology, was under attack by AMICA (Association of Italian Doctors of Contraception and Abortion), the Luca Coscioni Association and the UAAR because it prohibits in its classrooms, having written it in its statutes (in the part called: Charter of Purposes), the teaching of the practice of abortion (as well as that of euthanasia, sterilization and artificial insemination), thus, in fact, imposing an institute conscientious objection, therefore no longer personal, against abortion on the trainees/graduates, in violation of the law on the subject. The aforementioned associations are asking the ministerial and university authorities, by appeal, that this campus therefore have its ministerial accreditation for the school of obstetrics and gynecology revoked.

== See also ==
- Himetop - The History of Medicine Topographical Database
