= Accademia Nazionale d'Arte Drammatica Silvio D'Amico =

Education organization in Rome, Italy

Coordinates: 41°55′12.01″N 12°29′36.32″E

- Established: 1936
- Endowment: Ministry of Education, Universities and Research (MIUR) and the Ministry of Cultural Heritage and Activities
- Location: Rome, Italy
- Website: www.silviodamico.it

Accademia Nazionale d'Arte Drammatica Silvio D'Amico (translation: Silvio d'Amico National Academy of Dramatic Arts) is a national drama school in Rome, Italy. Founded in 1936 by the theatrical theorist, critic, and writer Silvio D'Amico, the academy is the only state school for the training of actors and directors. Funded jointly by the Ministry of Education, Universities and Research (MIUR) and the Ministry of Cultural Heritage and Activities, the Academy grants academic degrees equivalent to Bachelor of Arts as well as master's degrees. Its value comes from being the only school in Italy to be recognized by the Prime Minister / Department of Performing Arts and the Ministry of University and Scientific and Technological Research.

== History ==
In 1936, the academy replaced the former Director Acting school dedicated to Eleonora Duse. D'Amico, a friend of Nobel prize winner Luigi Pirandello and French theatre director Jacques Copeau, was appointed Special Commissioner for the reform of the drama school and led the academy for many years. Since its early foundation, the Academy has distinguished itself as a national reference centre for traditional theatrical heritage, as well as through experimentation and research. With the advent of arts and music reform, the Academy became part of the sector-level Higher Education in Art and Music (AFAM), established by Law No. 508 of 21 December 1999.

== Admission ==
Admission to the Academy is determined annually by a public competition announced by the Ministry of Education. The competition is open to Italians and foreigners who have successfully completed high school and are between the ages of 18 and 25 years. Those who are admitted into the academy must attend it in order to access not only to the teaching program, but also entertainment, experimentation, and seminars carried out before the term starts, from July to September.

== Academic program ==
The academic year begins in November and ends in June. The coursework is intensive, requiring motivation and commitment. It includes lessons, exercises and testing, ten hours per day, six days a week. The two main courses, directing and acting, have common material such as the interpretation of dramatic text using theoretical, critical, technical and artistic material. The prestige of the Academy includes the participation of important figures in the dramatic arts, who contribute to the lesson program, or in seminars, special courses and meetings. This allows the students of theatre and film to make a comparison between the teaching and professional work. Academic activities are presented to the public with the production of approximately eight events per year, made with the students, supported by professionals and directed by renowned professionals, including technical staff such as set designers, costume designers, and lighting designers.

The Academy provides training in dramatic theatre, the opera and the Italian cinema. The program is structured in three stages. After completing the three-year program, students are granted a diploma equivalent to a university degree. Those who complete the first three years and move on to the fourth may be granted a scholarship, the additional year being used for specialization training.

== Special events ==
Some of the special events, such as the college summer theatre that began in 1983 in collaboration with the Fondazione Teatro di Pisa, have lasted over the years and are considered important points of reference. In recent years, the Academy has developed a strong policy of international relations, participating in many festivals and establishing relations and joint projects with other important European schools such as the Russian Academy of Theatre Arts (GITIS) in Moscow, the Guildhall School of Music and Drama in London, the Institut del Teatre in Barcelona, the Berlin University of the Arts, and the École nationale supérieure des arts et techniques du théâtre (ENSATT) in Lyon. The Academy regularly performs on tour in Europe and other continents.

== Notable alumni ==
Specializing in the field of drama, with particular attention to the drama of its national heritage, the Academy has played a key role in the Italian film and theater scene and is currently headed by M°Lorenzo Salveti. It has prepared artists such as Margherita Buy, Vittorio Gassman, Luigi Lo Cascio, Anna Magnani, Nino Manfredi, and Monica Vitti. Other former alumni include Antoniano, Manuela Arcuri, Mino Bellei, Carmelo Bene, Dirk van den Berg, Giuliana Berlinguer, Alessio Boni, Alberto Bonucci, Giulio Bosetti, Renato De Carmine, Ennio Fantastichini, Gabriele Ferzetti (expelled), Scilla Gabel, Domiziana Giordano, Miguel Angel Landa, Roberto Pacini, Michele Placido, Luca Ronconi, Gian Maria Volonté and Lina Wertmüller.
