= List of science magazines =

Periodical publication with news, opinions, and reports about science

A science magazine is a periodical publication with news, opinions, and reports about science, generally written for a non-expert audience. In contrast, a periodical publication, usually including primary research and/or reviews, that is written by scientific experts is called a "scientific journal". Science magazines are read by non-scientists and scientists who want accessible information on fields outside their specialization.

Articles in science magazines are sometimes republished or summarized by the general press.

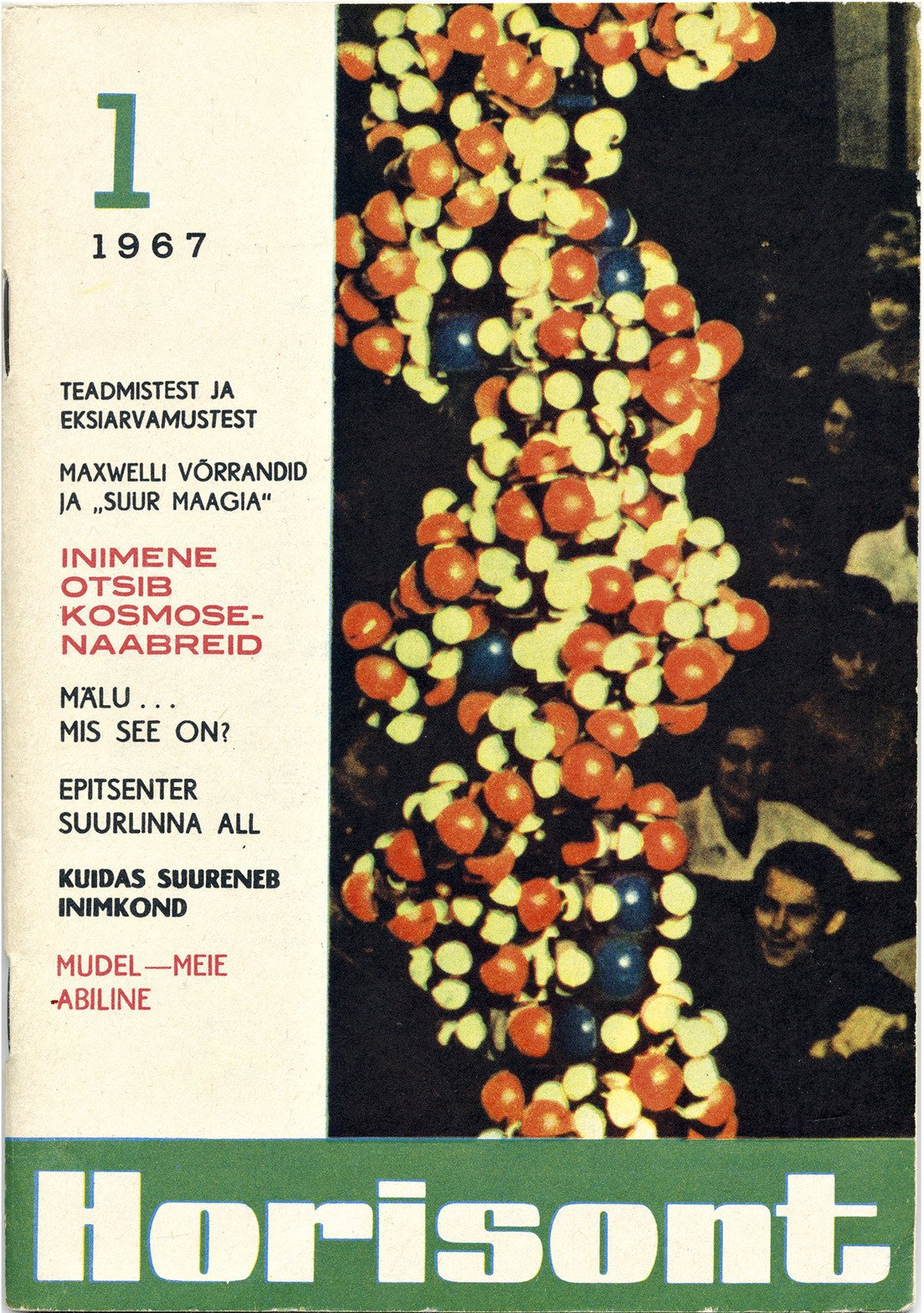
Horisont is the oldest continuously published general science magazine in Estonia. Cover image from 1967.

== Examples of general science magazines ==
=== Africa ===
- techcabal

=== Asia ===
==== Bangladesh ====
- Byapon – Youth Science Magazine in Bengali
- Bigganchinta
- BigganBarta (বিজ্ঞানবার্তা) – Free PDF Science Magazine in Bengali
- Bangachi (ব্যাঙাচি) – Free Science Magazine in Bengali published by Banger Chhater Biggan
- Biggan Ananda (বিজ্ঞান আনন্দ) - Published by Bangladesh Science Fiction Society (BSFS)
- Zero to Infinity (জিরো টু ইনফিনিটি)

==== India ====
- Resonance, published by Indian Academy of Sciences
- Current Science
- Dream 2047, published by Vigyan Prasar
- Jnan o Bijnan, published by Bangiya Bijnan Parishad
- Sandarbh
- Science Reporter
- Safari

==== Japan ====
- Newton press
- Nikkei Science

==== Kazakhstan ====
- OYLA

==== Pakistan ====
- Global Science

==== South Korea ====
- Donga Science

==== Turkey ====
- Bilim ve Teknik

=== Europe ===
- EuroScientist

==== Austria ====
- Universum

==== Czechia ====
- Vesmír

==== Denmark ====
- Aktuel Naturvidenskab
- Illustreret Videnskab

==== Finland ====
- Tiede

==== France ====
- La Recherche
- Pour la Science
- Science & Vie

==== Germany ====
- Spektrum der Wissenschaft
- Welt der Physik
- Bild der Wissenschaft
- Laborjournal
- Science Notes
- DUZ

==== Italy ====
- Popular Science Italia
- Airone
- Focus
- Le Scienze

==== Netherlands ====
- Quest
- Zenit

==== Poland ====
- Wiedza i Życie

==== Russia ====
- Khimiya i Zhizn
- Nauka i Zhizn
- Tekhnika Molodezhi
- Kvant
- Vokrug sveta
- Znanie – Sila

==== Serbia ====
- SciTech

==== Sweden ====
- Illustrerad Vetenskap

==== United Kingdom ====
- All About Space
- BBC Focus
- BBC Science Focus
- BBC Sky at Night
- Laboratory News
- New Scientist
- Physics World
- Scientific European

=== North America ===
==== United States ====
===== General =====
- American Scientist
- Behavioral Scientist
- Discover
- MIT Technology Review
- Popular Mechanics
- Knowable Magazine
- Popular Science
- Nautilus
- New Scientist
- Quanta Magazine
- Science (1979–1986)
- Science News
- Scientific American
- Seed

===== Astronomy/Aerospace =====
- Air & Space
- Astronomy
- Mercury
- Planetary Report
- Sky & Telescope
- Spinoff

===== Others =====
- Physics Today
- Scientific American Mind
- The Scientist
- Skeptic
- Technologist
- Weatherwise

=== Oceania ===
==== Australia ====
- Australasian Science
- Australian Geographic
- Cosmos
- New Scientist

=== South America ===
==== Brazil ====
- Galileu
- Superinteressante
- Ciência Hoje
- Revista Pesquisa FAPESP

==== Chile ====
- Argo Navis

== See also ==
- Popular science
- Science book
- Science journalism
