= Yuri Nesterenko =

Yuri Nesterenko may refer to:

- Yuri Nesterenko (footballer, born 1956), Soviet football player and Russian coach
- Yuri Nesterenko (footballer, born 1991), Russian footballer
- Yuri Nesterenko (mathematician) (born 1946), Russian mathematician
- Yuri Leonidovich Nesterenko (born 1972), or George Yury Right, Russian American writer
- Yury Nesterenko (politician), member of the Russian Duma representing Simferopol constituency since 2023
