= Yesterday, Today and Tomorrow =

1963 film by Vittorio De Sica

- Theatrical release poster
- Italian: Ieri, oggi, domani
- Directed by: Vittorio De Sica
- Written by: Eduardo De Filippo; Cesare Zavattini; Billa Billa; Isabella Quarantotti
- Produced by: Carlo Ponti
- Starring: Sophia Loren; Marcello Mastroianni
- Cinematography: Giuseppe Rotunno
- Edited by: Adriana Novelli
- Music by: Armando Trovajoli
- Production companies: Compagnia Cinematografica Champion; Les Films Concordia
- Distributed by: Interfilm (Italy); Cocinor (France)
- Release dates: 21 December 1963 (Italy); 15 May 1964 (France)
- Running time: 118 minutes
- Countries: Italy; France
- Language: Italian
- Box office: $4.1 million (US and Canada rentals); $9.3 million (US and Canada)

Yesterday, Today and Tomorrow (Italian: Ieri, oggi, domani) is a 1963 comedy anthology film directed by Vittorio De Sica. Starring Sophia Loren and Marcello Mastroianni, the film consists of three short stories about couples in different parts of Italy. The film won the Academy Award for Best Foreign Language Film at the 37th Academy Awards.

== Plot ==
=== Adelina of Naples ===
- Written by Eduardo De Filippo in collaboration with Isabella Quarantotti

In 1954, in the working-class Naples district of Forcella, Adelina supports her unemployed husband Carmine and their child by selling black market cigarettes in the street while pregnant with their second child. When her furniture is to be repossessed due to an unpaid fine, her neighbours assist her by hiding the furniture. A local lawyer warns Carmine that, since the fine and furniture are under Adelina's name, she will be imprisoned. However, Italian law stipulates that women cannot be imprisoned while pregnant or within six months after the delivery. Armed with this information, Adelina schemes to stay pregnant continuously.

After seven children in eight years, Carmine becomes too exhausted to perform sexually and Adelina nearly resorts to being impregnated by their mutual friend Pasquale, but decides against it. She then turns herself in, and the whole neighbourhood gathers money to free her and petition for her pardon, which eventually occurs and she is reunited with Carmine and their children.

=== Anna of Milan ===
- Written by Cesare Zavattini and Billa Billa
- Based on the short story "Troppo ricca" by Alberto Moravia

While her wealthy industrialist husband is on a business trip to Stuttgart, bored Milanese housewife Anna picks up her lover Renzo, a lower-class writer, in her husband's Rolls-Royce for a drive in the countryside. She feels neglected by her husband, who, according to her, only cares about work and money. On the drive, Anna allows Renzo to take the wheel of the Rolls-Royce, and while she seductively proposes that they run away together that night, he swerves to avoid a young boy selling flowers by the roadside and crashes the car into a tractor. Infuriated by the damage to her Rolls-Royce, Anna hitches a ride home with a passing motorist, leaving Renzo by the side of the road. After begrudgingly buying a bouquet of flowers from the boy, Renzo throws the flowers away as he walks away.

=== Mara of Rome ===
- Written by Cesare Zavattini

Mara works as a prostitute from her rooftop apartment overlooking Piazza Navona, servicing a variety of regular high-end clients including Augusto, the wealthy, powerful and neurotic son of a Bologna industrialist. One evening, Mara befriends Umberto, a handsome and callow young man studying for the priesthood but not yet ordained, who is visiting his grandparents in the adjacent apartment. Embarrassed to disclose her real occupation, she tells him that she is a manicurist. Umberto's strict grandmother sees them talking and, knowing that Mara is a prostitute, interrupts their conversation, telling Mara that she will go to hell and threatening to start a petition to have her evicted from the building. Umberto protests, but Mara defends herself.

The next day, Umberto's distraught grandmother visits Mara and informs her that her grandson, who is infatuated with Mara, is willing to renounce his priesthood to be with her. Sympathetic, Mara vows to set Umberto on the path of righteousness back to the seminary and, if she succeeds, she will take a vow of celibacy for a week. When Umberto argues with his grandparents and threatens to join the French Foreign Legion, Mara goes over to their apartment, with the reluctant Augusto in tow, and finally persuades Umberto to return to the seminary, earning his grandmother's gratitude. Mara rewards Augusto with a striptease but stops as she remembers her week-long vow. Frustrated, Augusto prepares to leave, but Mara convinces him to stay and pray with her.

== Cast ==
"Adelina"

- Sophia Loren as Adelina Sbaratti
- Marcello Mastroianni as Carmine Sbaratti
- Aldo Giuffrè as Pasquale Nardella
- Agostino Salvietti as Dr. Verace
- Lino Mattera as Amedeo Scapece
- Tecla Scarano as Verace's sister
- Silvia Monelli as Elivira Nardella
- Carlo Croccolo as auctioneer
- Pasquale Cennamo as chief police
- Tonino Cianci as Antonio Cianci

"Anna"

- Sophia Loren as Anna Molteni
- Marcello Mastroianni as Renzo
- Armando Trovajoli as Giorgio Ferrario

"Mara"

- Sophia Loren as Mara
- Marcello Mastroianni as Augusto Rusconi
- Tina Pica as Grandmother Ferrario
- Gianni Ridolfi (credited as Giovanni Ridolfi) as Umberto
- Gennaro Di Gregorio as Grandfather Vincenzo

== Production ==
The "Adelina" segment is based on the true story of Concetta Muccardi, a Neapolitan street vendor of contraband cigarettes who had 19 pregnancies to avoid going to prison. Muccardi died on 21 November 2001 at the age of 78, by which time five of her children were still alive.

For her striptease scene in the "Mara" segment, Loren was coached by Jacques Ruet, choreographer for the Crazy Horse.

== Reception ==
=== Box office ===
Yesterday, Today and Tomorrow grossed $9.3 million in North America, becoming the third highest-grossing Italian film at the time, behind La Dolce Vita and 8½. The film brought home $8 million in proceeds for Carlo Ponti's company.

=== Critical response and legacy ===
John Simon of The New Leader described Yesterday, Today and Tomorrow as an "overrated dud", while Brendan Gill of The New Yorker referred to it, in passing, as a "club sandwich." Bosley Crowther, in The New York Times, found it a "wonderfully elaborated burlesque." For Variety, the objects of "this breezy, non-cerebral, three-episoder," are "the wonders of Italy and Sophia Loren." It's a film, it reads, directed with "cinematic flair and invested with sensual gusto."

In 2015, Sophia Loren's autobiography was published, under the title Yesterday, Today and Tomorrow: My Life. In 2021, Jacek Górecki's retrospective view of De Sica's oeuvre in Gazzetta Italia was similarly titled "Ieri, oggi, domani."

=== Accolades ===
- 1965 Academy Award for Best Foreign Language Film
- 1965 BAFTA Award for Best Foreign Actor – Marcello Mastroianni
- 1964 Golden Globes – Samuel Goldwyn Award (nomination)
- 1964 David di Donatello Awards – David for Best Production – Carlo Ponti
- 1964 National Board of Review, USA - NBR award.

== See also ==
- List of submissions to the 37th Academy Awards for Best Foreign Language Film
- List of Italian submissions for the Academy Award for Best Foreign Language Film
