= Brian J. Ford =

British academic and author (born 1939)

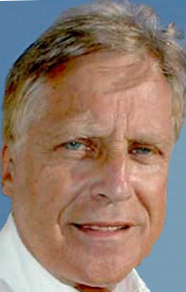
- Born: 1939 (age 86–87); Corsham, Wiltshire, England
- Occupations: Scientist, author and broadcaster

Brian J. Ford HonFLS HonFRMS (born on May 13, 1939 in Corsham, Wiltshire) is an independent research biologist, author, and lecturer, who publishes on scientific issues for the general public. He has also been a television personality for more than 40 years. Ford is an international authority on the microscope. Throughout his career, Ford has been associated with many academic bodies. He was elected a Fellow of Cardiff University in 1986, was appointed Visiting Professor at the University of Leicester, and has been awarded Honorary Fellowship of the Royal Microscopical Society and of the Linnean Society of London. In America, he was awarded the inaugural Köhler Medal and was recently recipient of the Ernst Abbe medal awarded by the New York Microscopical Society. In 2004 he was awarded a personal fellowship from NESTA, the National Endowment for Science, Technology and the Arts. During those three years he delivered 150 lectures in scores of countries, meeting 10,000 people in over 350 universities around the world.

== Education ==
Ford attended the King's School, Peterborough, and then Cardiff University to study botany and zoology between 1959 and 1961, leaving before graduating to set up his own multi-disciplinary laboratory.

== Career and positions ==
=== Universities ===
- Honorary fellow of Cardiff University
- Former dining member of Gonville and Caius College University of Cambridge
- Honorary member of Keynes College, University of Kent
- President Emeritus of Cambridge Society for the Application of Research
- Former Fellow at the Open University
- Formerly Visiting Professor at the University of Leicester
- President (and now President Emeritus) of University of Cambridge Society for the Application of Research

=== Learned Societies ===
- Fellow of the Linnean Society - serving as a member of their council as their Zoological Secretary and is their honorary surveyor of scientific instruments
- Fellow of the Institute of Biology - a former member of their council and chairman of their history network (He also edited: Institute of Biology: The First Fifty Years which is devoted to the history of this Institute.)
- Life fellow of Cambridge Philosophical Society
- Fellowship by the National Endowment for Science, Technology and Art in 2004
- Honorary Fellow of the Royal Microscopical Society - appointed in February 2017, having been elected as an ordinary fellow in 1962

=== Other positions ===
He was the first British President of the European Union of Science Journalists' Associations, founding Chairman of the Science and Technology Authors Committee at the Society of Authors, and the president of the Cambridge Society for the Application of Research (CSAR) of Cambridge University. Ford has been a member of Mensa and was a director of British Mensa from 1993–1997, resigning a few months after being elected for a second term. He was elected a Fellow of the Royal Microscopical Society in 1962.

== Aquatic dinosaur hypothesis ==
In the April 2012 issue of Laboratory News, Ford put forward the idea that all large dinosaurs were aquatic, arguing that they were too large and heavy to be land animals. In 2018, Too Big To Walk: The New Science of Dinosaurs, a book authored by Ford and published by William Collins (an imprint of HarperCollins), was released expounding on this hypothesis.

Although evidence has been presented for some dinosaurs like spinosaurids being partially aquatic, reaction to Ford's theory that the majority of dinosaurs being largely aquatic have been highly, if not universally negative, with other experts in the fields of paleontology and paleobiology having continuously disproven or refuted Ford's claims, with some suggesting Ford's hypotheses could be relegated as fringe theories. Several paleontologists, such as Darren Naish, have directly countered Ford in his arguments using documented evidence of dinosaurs being terrestrial to back their rebuttals to his work.

== Bibliography ==
=== Books ===
- Allied Secret Weapons: the War of Science; Weapons Book #19, ISBN 0-345-02097-9 . USA Ballantine Books, 1970. ISBN 0-356-03746-0, UK, Macdonald, 1970.
- Microbiology and food, ISBN 0-9501665-0-2 (hardback), UK, Catering Times, 1971. ISBN 0-9501665-1-0 (paperback). UK, Northwood, 1970.
- German secret weapons, blueprint for Mars, ISBN 0-356-03034-2. Australia, South Africa, & New Zealand, Macdonald.
- Nonscience . . . or how to rule the world, ISBN 0-7234-0449-6. UK, Wolfe, 1971.
- The optical microscope manual, past and present uses and techniques, ISBN 0-7153-5862-6. UK, David & Charles, 1973. ISBN 0-8448-0157-7. USA, Crane Russak, 1973.
- The revealing lens, mankind and the microscope, ISBN 0-245-51016-8. UK, George Harrap, 1973.
- Microbe power, tomorrow's revolution, ISBN 0-356-08384-5. UK, Macdonald and Jane's, 1976. ISBN 0-8128-1936-5. USA, Stein and Day, 1976.
- Patterns of sex, the mating urge and our sexual future, ISBN 0-354-04375-7. UK, Macdonald and Janes, 1979. ISBN 0-312-59811-4. USA, St Martin's Press, 1980.
- The Cult of the expert (hardback) ISBN 0-241-10476-9, (paperback) 0552122491. UK, Transworld, 1982.
- 101 questions about science, ISBN 0-241-10992-2. UK, Hamish Hamilton, 1983.
- 101 more questions about science, ISBN 0-241-11246-X. UK, Hamish Hamilton, 1984.
- Single lens, the story of the simple microscope, ISBN 0-434-26844-5. UK, William Heinemann, 1985. ISBN 0-06-015366-0. USA, Harper & Row, 1985.
- Compute, how, where, why ... do you really need to? ISBN 0-241-11490-X. UK, Hamish Hamilton, 1985.
- The food book, ISBN 0-241-11834-4. UK, Hamish Hamilton, 1986.
- The human body, ISBN 1-85561-013-2. UK, Belitha Books, ISBN 1-85561-040-X. USA, Belitha, 1990.
- The Leeuwenhoek legacy, ISBN 0-948737-10-7. UK, Biopress, ISBN 1-85083-016-9. UK, Farrand Press, 1991.
- Images of science, a history of scientific illustration, ISBN 0-7123-0267-0. UK, British Library, 1992. ISBN 0-19-520983-4. USA, Oxford University Press, 1993.
- My first encyclopaedia of science, ISBN 0-86272-944-0. UK, Kingfisher Books, 1993.
- The new Guinness book of records quiz book, ISBN 0-85112-635-9. UK, Guinness Publishing, 1994.
- BSE the facts, ISBN 0-552-14530-0. UK, Transworld, 1996.
- Genes, the fight for life, ISBN 0-304-35019-2. UK, Cassells, 1999. ISBN 0-304-35019-2. USA, Sterling Publications, 1999.
- Sensitive souls, senses and communication in plants, animals and microbes, ISBN 0-316-63956-7. UK, Little, Brown, 1999.
- The Future of food, ISBN 0-500-28075-4. UK, Thames & Hudson, 2000. ISBN 0-500-28075-4. USA and Canada, Thames & Hudson, 2000.
- Secret language of life, how animals and plants feel and communicate, ISBN 0-88064-254-8. USA, Fromm International, 2000.
- Using the digital microscope, ISBN 0-9543595-0-X. UK, Rothay House, 2002.
- Secret Weapons: Technology, Science and the Race to Win World War II, ISBN 1-84908-390-8. UK, Osprey Publishing, 2011.
- Too Big To Walk: The New Science of Dinosaurs, ISBN 9-78000821-893-5. UK, William Collins, 2019.
- Nonscience Returns, ISBN 9-78099340-025-4., UK, Curtis Press,2020.

=== Audio Book ===
- Understanding Viruses, 30 Questions, 25 Geniuses, 100 Amazing Insights, ISBN 9-78173675-720-8. USA, Finding Genius Foundation, 2021.

=== Book chapters ===
- "The recovery, removal, and reconstruction of human skeletal remains, some new techniques", chapter in Field manual for museums. Paris, UNESCO, 1970.
- "Récuperation, enlèvement et reconstitution des ossements", chapter in Musées et recherches sur le terrain. Paris, UNESCO, 1970.
- Brian J Ford explains why he considers Cardiff the most unappreciated city in the world, chapter in The Cardiff book, ISBN 0-900807-05-9. Barry: Stewart Williams Publishers, 1973.
- "Discharge to the environment of viruses in wastewater, sludges and aerosols", chapter with JS Slade in Viral pollution of the environment, ed: G Berg, ISBN 0-8493-6245-8. Boca Raton, CRC Press, 1983.
- "Sexually transmitted diseases", chapter in Sex and Your Health ed J Bevan, ISBN 0-85533-571-8. London, Mitchell Beazley, 1985.
- "Las Enfermedades de Transmisión Sexual y Otras que las Imitan", chapter in El Sexo y la Salud ed J Bevan, ISBN 84-320-4570-5. Barcelona, Editorial Planeta, 1985.
- "Exploring South Wales", chapter in Walking in Britain, ed J. Hillaby, ISBN 0-00-412272-0. London: William Collins, 1988.
- Robert Hooke, an introduction to Hooke's Micrographia, commentary on CD-ROM edition of Micrographia, 1665 ISBN 1-891788-02-7. Palo Alto, Octavo, 1998.
- "Witnessing the birth of the microscope", photoessay in Millennium yearbook of science and the future, ISBN 0-85229-703-3. Chicago, Encyclopædia Britannica, 2000.
- "Eighteenth-century scientific publishing", chapter in Scientific books, libraries and collectors, ISBN 1-85928-233-4. London, Thornton & Tully, 2000.
- "Scientific Illustration", chapter in vol 4 of The Cambridge history of science, ed R Porter ISBN 0-521-57243-6. Cambridge, Cambridge University Press, 2001.
- "Hidden secrets in the Royal Society archive", chapter 3 in Biological collections and biodiversity, eds BS Rushton, P Hackney and CR Tyrie, ISBN 1-84103-005-8. Otley, Westbury Academic and Scientific Publishing, 2001.
- "Trouble on the hoof, disease outbreaks in Europe," chapter in 2002 book of the year, ISBN 0-85229-812-9. Chicago, Encyclopædia Britannica, 2002.
- "Human behaviour and the changing pattern of disease", chapter in The changing face of disease, implications for society, ISBN 0-415-32280-4. London and Boca Raton, CRC Press, 2004.
- "What Next After SARS?" (Severe acute respiratory syndrome), chapter in 2004 book of the year, ISBN 0-85229-812-9. Chicago, Encyclopædia Britannica, 2004.
- "Bird flu, the next pandemic?", chapter in 2006 book of the year, ISBN 1-59339-291-5. Chicago, Encyclopædia Britannica, 2006.
- "Robert Hooke", [in] The Great Naturalists, ISBN 0500251398, editor Rob Huxley, Natural History Museum, UK: Thames & Hudson, 2007.
- "Antony van Leeuwenhoek" [in] The Great Naturalists, ISBN 0500251398, editor Rob Huxley, Natural History Museum, UK: Thames & Hudson, 2007.
- "Cork and blood smear with Leeuwenhoek microscope" [in] Introduction to Microbiology, ISBN 0321929152, US: Sudbury MA: Jones & Bartlett Publishers, Inc., 2007.
- "Microscopy in early neurology" [in] Whitaker, Harry; Smith, C. U. M. & Finger, Stan, (editors) Brain, Mind and Medicine: essays in 18th century neuroscience, ISBN 0387709665. Springer, 2007.
- "Did Physics matter to the Pioneers of Microscopy?" [in] Advances in Imaging and Electron Physics 158: 27-87, Editor Professor Peter W Hawkes, ISBN 9780128171776. New York: Academic Press, 2009.
- "Culturing Meat for the Future: Anti-death versus anti-life", [in] Tandy, Charles (editor) Death And Anti-Death, Volume 7, ISBN 9781934297056. Palo Alto: Ria University Press, 2010.
- "The Future of Food" [in] Faculty of Medicine Study manual, (two volumes). Japan: Z-kai Inc., Shizuoka, 2019.
- "Robert Brown's Microscope, 1827-1833", [in] 50 Objects, Stories and Discoveries, ISBN 0993551017. London: Linnean Society, 2020.
