= Kiss the Other Sheik =

1965 film

- Directed by: Eduardo De Filippo; Marco Ferreri; Luciano Salce
- Written by: Marco Ferreri; Rafael Azcona; Eduardo De Filippo; Isabella Quarantotti; Franco Castellano; Giuseppe Moccia; Luciano Salce
- Produced by: Carlo Ponti
- Starring: Marcello Mastroianni; Virna Lisi; Catherine Spaak; Luciano Salce
- Cinematography: Gianni Di Venanzo; Mario Montuori; Aldo Tonti
- Music by: Nino Rota; Teo Usuelli; Luis Bacalov
- Distributed by: Metro-Goldwyn-Mayer
- Release date: 1965
- Running time: 99 minutes
- Country: Italy
- Language: Italian

Kiss the Other Sheik (Italian: Oggi, domani, dopodomani, lit. 'Today, Tomorrow and the Day After Tomorrow'), also known as The Man, the Woman and the Money, is a 1965 Italian comedy film in three segments, directed by Eduardo De Filippo, Marco Ferreri, and Luciano Salce. It stars Marcello Mastroianni, Virna Lisi, Catherine Spaak, Pamela Tiffin, and Luciano Salce.

== Cast ==
- Marcello Mastroianni - Mario (segment "L'uomo dei 5 palloni") / Michele (segment "L'ora di punta", "La moglie bionda")
- Catherine Spaak - Giovanna (segment "L'uomo dei 5 palloni")
- Virna Lisi - Dorothea (segment "L'ora di punta")
- Luciano Salce - Arturo Rossi (segment "L'ora di punta")
- Pamela Tiffin - Pepita (segment "La moglie bionda")
- Lelio Luttazzi - Michele's Friend (segment "La moglie bionda")
- Raimondo Vianello - Police Commissioner (ep. "La moglie bionda")
- Ugo Tognazzi - Driver (segment "L'uomo dei 5 palloni")
- William Berger - Benny (segment "L'uomo dei 5 palloni")

== Production ==
The film was produced by Carlo Ponti to make use of footage from Marco Ferreri's feature L'uomo dai 5 palloni ('The man with five balls'), starring Marcello Mastroianni, which had been deemed unreleasable. Ponti therefore decided to recut the film, turning it into a segment of an anthology feature, with two additional episodes newly shot, still featuring Mastroianni as the lead.

The first choice for the role of Pepita in the segment "La moglie bionda" was Sue Lyon, but was unable to take part in the film because her producer, Ray Stark, did not grant permission.

== Release ==
The film was released in Italy in late 1965. Joseph E. Levine and his company Embassy Pictures were supposed to release the film in the United States with the title Paranoia in 1966, but despite an already planned marketing campaign, Levine withdrew, reportedly because Ponti reneged on delivering a Sophia Loren film. Eventually Embassy Pictures and Ponti filed two lawsuits against each other for breach of contract; the lawsuits were eventually settled out of court.

In 1967, Ponti arranged a new cut of the film for the U.S. release, removing Ferreri's segment and extending the Luciano Salce's segment featuring Mastroianni and Pamela Tiffin with newly shot material. Eduardo De Filippo, Virna Lisi and screenwriter Isabella Quarantotti protested against this move, and requested their names to be removed from the credits. The film was finally released by MGM in the late summer of 1968. A different version titled The Man, the Woman and the Money, with the sexual content toned down, was released in early 1969.
