= Nesterenko =

Nesterenko (Ukrainian: Нестеренко) is a Ukrainian surname meaning son or daughter of Nester/Nestor.

It can refer to the following people:

- Eric Nesterenko (1933–2022), Canadian ice hockey player
- Igor Nesterenko (born 1990), Israeli-Ukrainian basketball player
- Ivan Nesterenko (born 2003), Ukrainian football player
- Lada Nesterenko (born 1976), Ukrainian cross country skier
- Nikita Nesterenko (born 2001), American ice hockey player
- Roman Nesterenko (born 1977), Kazakh football player
- Vassili Nesterenko (1934–2008), Belarusian physicist
- Yekaterina Nesterenko (born 1976), Russian alpine skier
- Yevgeny Nesterenko (1938–2021), Russian opera singer
- Yulia Nestsiarenka (born 1979), Belarusian sprinter
- Yuri Leonidovich Nesterenko (born 1972), Russian writer and antisexual activist
- Yuri Valentinovich Nesterenko (born 1946), Russian mathematician
