= Le Scienze =

Italian monthly science magazine

- Categories: Science, technology
- Frequency: Monthly
- Founded: 1968; 57 years ago
- Company: Gruppo Editoriale L'Espresso
- Country: Italy
- Based in: Milan
- Language: Italian
- Website: Le Scienze
- ISSN: 0036-8083

Le Scienze (The Sciences) is an Italian monthly science magazine, It is the Italian edition of Scientific American.

== History and profile ==
Published monthly since 1968, Le Scienze was founded by industrial Alberto Mondadori and scientist Felice Ippolito. The magazine is part of Gruppo Editoriale L'Espresso and is published on a monthly basis.

Le Scienze covers both high-rank American scientific results as well as Italian (and sometimes European) contributions to research. Among regular contributors to the magazine are Piergiorgio Odifreddi and Tullio Regge. The current director is Marco Cattaneo.

In 2007, the circulation of Le Scienze was 62,950 copies. It was 66,000 copies in 2010.

== See also ==
- List of magazines published in Italy
