= Ghosts – Italian Style =

1967 film

- Film poster
- Directed by: Renato Castellani
- Written by: Adriano Baracco; Leonardo Benvenuti; Renato Castellani; Piero De Bernardi; Eduardo De Filippo; Tonino Guerra
- Based on: Questi fantasmi 1946 play by Eduardo De Filippo
- Produced by: Carlo Ponti
- Starring: Sophia Loren; Vittorio Gassman; Marcello Mastroianni; Aldo Giuffrè
- Cinematography: Tonino Delli Colli
- Edited by: Jolanda Benvenuti
- Music by: Luis Bacalov
- Distributed by: Lux Film; Metro-Goldwyn-Mayer
- Release date: 23 December 1967
- Running time: 104 minutes
- Country: Italy
- Language: Italian

Ghosts – Italian Style (Italian: Questi fantasmi) is a 1967 Italian comedy film directed by Renato Castellani.

== Plot ==
Pasquale Lojacono and his wife Maria are very poor, and do not have a roof over their head. One day they are invited to live free in an apartment of a building, considered by tenants cursed, because there dwells the ghost of an old Spanish nobleman. The two, however, accept coexistence with the spirit.

== Cast ==
- Sophia Loren as Maria Lojacono
- Vittorio Gassman as Pasquale Lojacono
- Mario Adorf as Alfredo Mariano
- Aldo Giuffrè as Raffaele
- Margaret Lee as Sayonara
- Francis de Wolff as The Scotsman (as Francis De Wolffe)
- Francesco Tensi as Professor Santanna
- Augusta Merola as Anna
- Piera Degli Esposti
- Giovanni Tarallo
- Nietta Zocchi
- Valentino Macchi
- Lucio Dalla as The Musician
- Marcello Mastroianni as The Ghost (uncredited)
