= Angelica Ippolito =

Italian actress (born 1944)

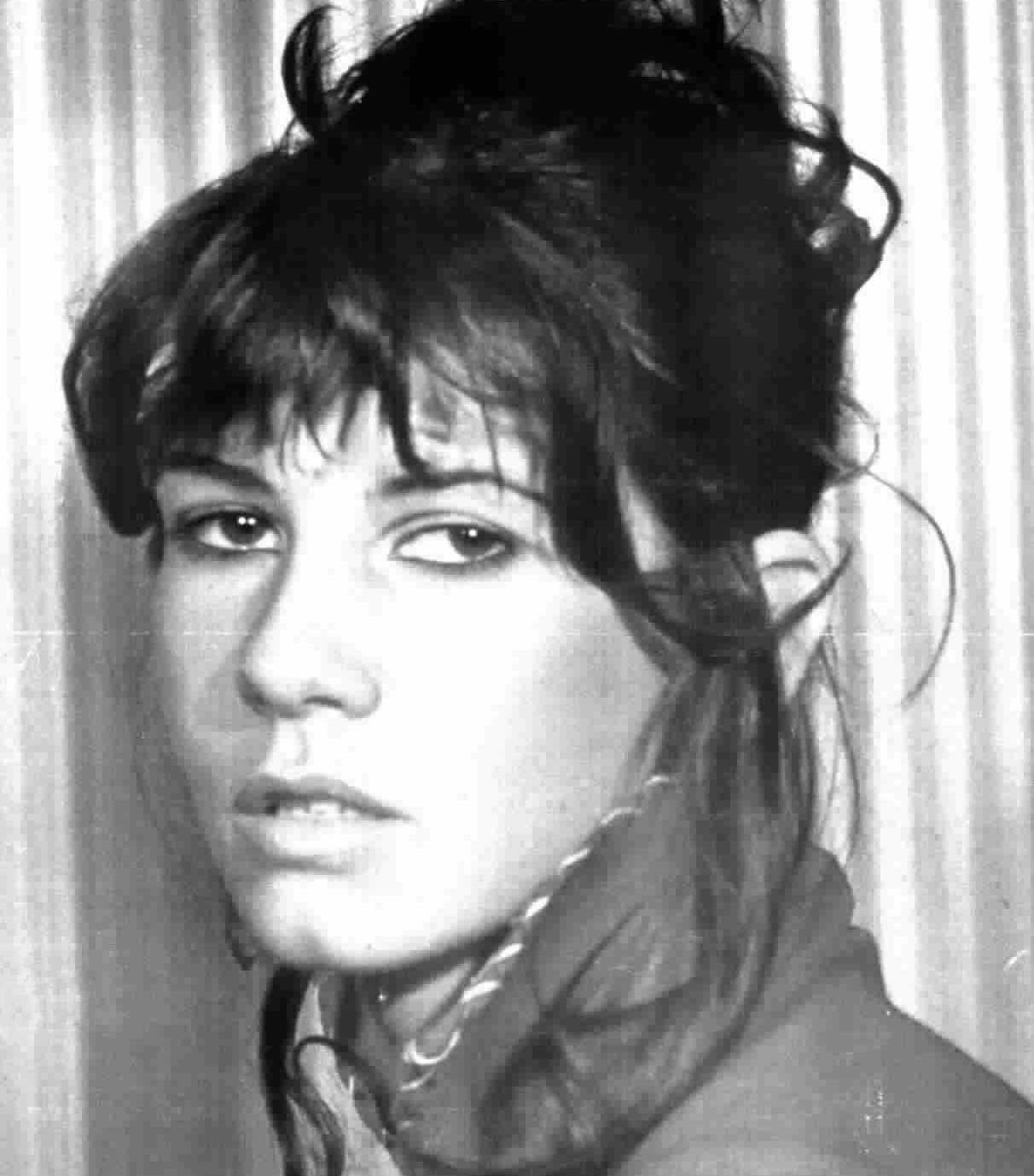
- Born: 8 September 1944 (age 82); Naples, Italy
- Occupation: Actress
- Partner(s): Andrea Franchetti; Gian Maria Volonté
- Children: Cody Franchetti
- Parent(s): Felice Ippolito; Isabella Quarantotti
- Relatives: Eduardo De Filippo (step-father); Luca De Filippo (step-brother)

Angelica Ippolito (born 8 September 1944) is an Italian stage, film and television actress.

== Life and career ==
Born in Naples to geologist Felice Ippolito and writer and playwright Isabella Quarantotti. Ippolito studied at the Silvio d’Amico Academy of Dramatic Arts in Rome and made her acting debut in the late 1960s. She worked extensively in the stage company of her mother's third husband, actor and playwright Eduardo De Filippo. In 1977 she won a Special David di Donatello Award for her performance in Alberto Lattuada's Oh, Serafina!. Ippolito was the last companion of the actor Gian Maria Volonté, from late 1970s until his death.

Ippolito has a son, Cody Franchetti, from her relationship with Andrea Franchetti, son of an italian baron who married a Milliken heiress. Cody was featured in the documentaries Born Rich and The One Percent.

== Selected filmography ==
- His Day of Glory (1969)
- Oh, Serafina! (1976)
- Il mostro (1977)
- I Am Afraid (1977)
- Pestalozzi's Mountain (1989)
- Tre colonne in cronaca (1990)
- Guardami (1999)
- Free the Fish (2000)
- Chimera (2001)
