= Oh, Serafina! =

- Directed by: Alberto Lattuada
- Written by: Enrico Vanzina; Alberto Lattuada; Giuseppe Berto
- Starring: Renato Pozzetto; Dalila Di Lazzaro
- Cinematography: Lamberto Caimi
- Edited by: Sergio Montanari
- Music by: Fred Bongusto
- Release date: 1976
- Language: Italian

Oh, Serafina! is a 1976 Italian comedy-drama film directed by Alberto Lattuada.

It is strictly based on the novel with the same name by Giuseppe Berto. Fred Bongusto was awarded with a Nastro d'Argento for Best Score for this film.

== Cast ==
- Renato Pozzetto: Augusto Valle
- Dalila Di Lazzaro: Serafina
- Angelica Ippolito: Palmira Radice, moglie di Augusto
- Marisa Merlini: mamma di Augusto
- Gino Bramieri: Il sindaco
- Aldo Giuffrè: Professor Caroniti
- Fausto Tozzi: Carlo Vigeva
- Enrico Beruschi: Impiegato anagrafe
- Lilla Brignone: Segretaria della ditta Valle
- Howard Ross: Romeo Radice
- Brizio Montinaro: Rag.Cusetti
- Gianni Magni: Tommaso
- Ettore Manni: padre di Serafina
- Alberto Lattuada: Medico del manicomio
- Daniele Vargas: Assessore Buglio
- Maria Monti

== See also ==
- List of Italian films of 1976
