= Eduardo De Filippo =

Italian actor, director and playwright (1900–1984)

Eduardo De Filippo OMRI
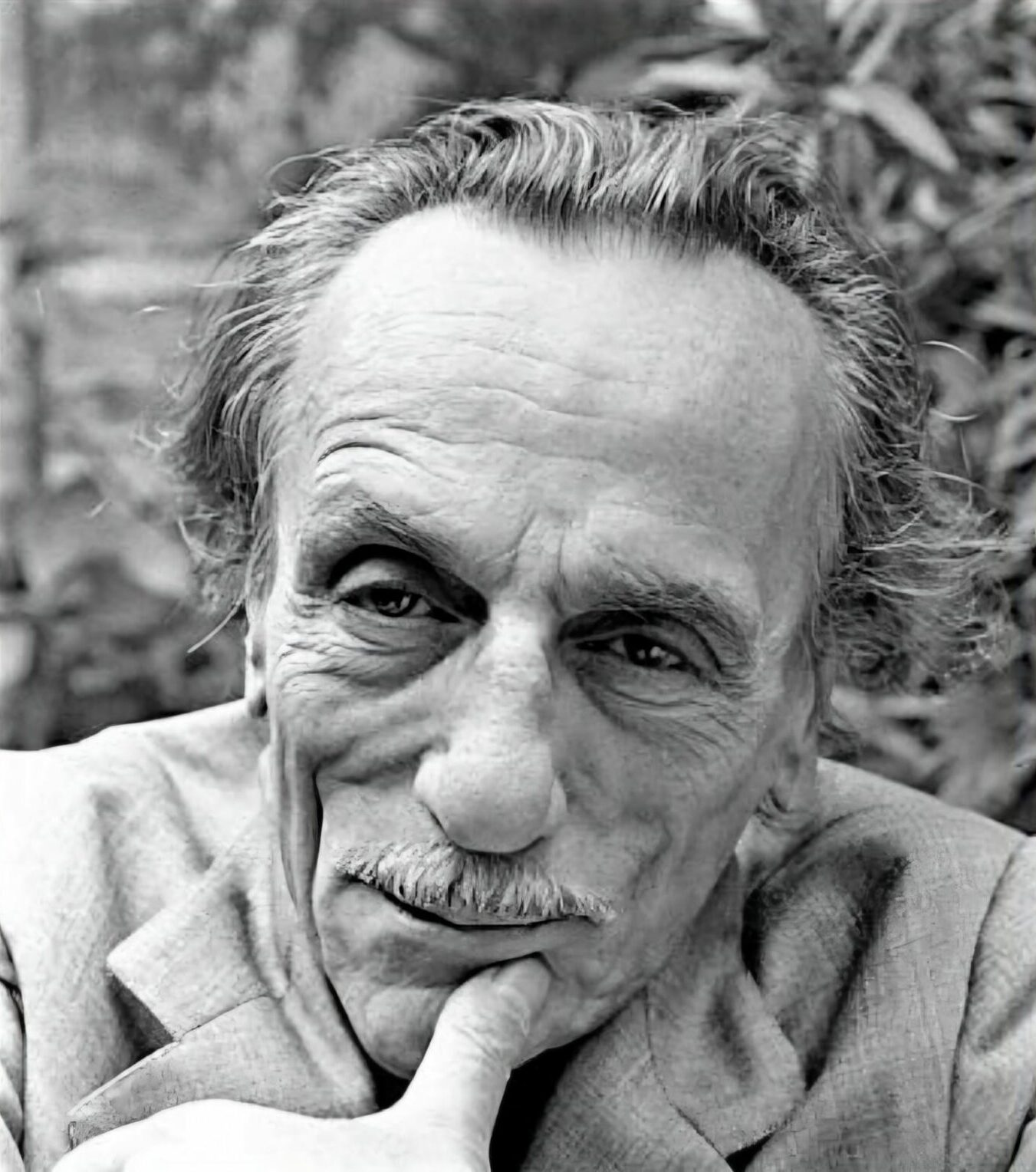
- De Filippo in the 1970s
- Born: 24 May 1900; Naples, Kingdom of Italy
- Died: 31 October 1984 (aged 84); Rome, Italy
- Occupations: Actor; director; playwright; screenwriter
- Years active: 1914–1984
- Spouses: Dorothy Pennington (m. 1928; div. 1955) Thea Prandi (m. 1956; died 1961) Isabella Quarantotti (m. 1977)
- Children: Luisa "Luisella" De Filippo; Luca De Filippo; Angelica Ippolito (stepdaughter)
- Parents: Eduardo Scarpetta (father); Luisa De Filippo (mother)
- Relatives: Peppino De Filippo (brother); Titina De Filippo (sister); Eduardo Passarelli (half-brother); Pietro Carloni (brother-in-law); Ester Carloni (sister-in-law); Luigi De Filippo (nephew)

Member of the Senate of the Republic
- Life tenure 26 September 1981 – 31 October 1984
- Appointed by: Sandro Pertini

Eduardo De Filippo OMRI (Italian: [eduˈardo de fiˈlippo]; 26 May 1900 – 31 October 1984), also known mononymously as Eduardo, was an Italian actor, director, screenwriter, and playwright, best known for his Neapolitan works Filumena Marturano and Napoli milionaria. Considered one of the most important Italian artists of the 20th century, De Filippo was the author of many theatrical dramas staged and directed by himself first and later awarded and played outside Italy. For his artistic merits and contributions to Italian culture, he was named senator for life by the President of the Italian Republic Sandro Pertini.

== Early life and family ==
De Filippo was born in Naples on 26 May 1900. For many years, his birth date was mistakenly thought to be 24 May, but recent research in anagraphic books proved 26 to be the right date. Eduardo was the second son of playwright and actor Eduardo Scarpetta, the "king" of Neapolitan theatre, and theatre seamstress and costumier Luisa De Filippo. He and his siblings Annunziata "Titina" and Giuseppe "Peppino" were extramarital because Scarpetta was actually married since 1876 to Rosa De Filippo, Luisa's paternal aunt. Scarpetta had six more illegitimate children from various affairs, including actors Ernesto Murolo and Eduardo Passarelli. Scarpetta never acknowledged Eduardo De Filippo and his siblings, which is why the son took his mother's name.

== Career ==
=== Theatre ===
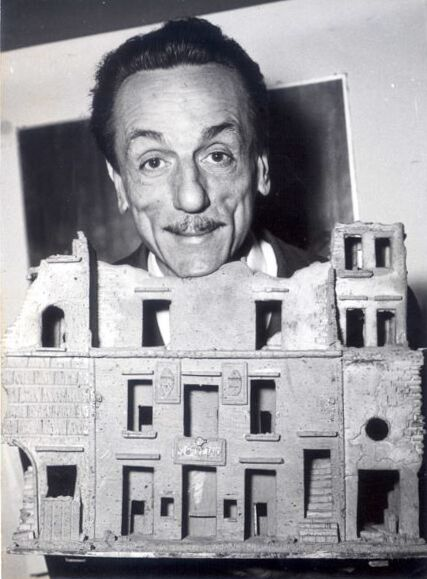
De Filippo with a model of the Teatro San Carlino, 1955

Eduardo De Filippo first appeared on stage at the age of four. At 14, he became a professional actor in Scarpetta's company and played there until 1927. In 1925, the company played in Milan's Teatro Fossati where Eduardo di Filippo was spotted and then praised in a review by Renato Simoni, then the most influential critic of Italy.

In 1931, Eduardo formed a theatre company with his brother Peppino and sister Titina, called Compagnia del Teatro Umoristico I De Filippo. They invented a new genre and a unique artistic approach, rooted in commedia dell'arte but not prone to its limitations. In 1931–32 the company toured Italy, then they returned to Naples and staged for Teatro Nuovo such plays as Farmacia di turno (The On-Duty Farmacy), Tutti insieme canteremo (We'll All Sing Together), Miseria Bella (Splendid Poverty). On 24 December 1931, they performed a one-act play Natale in casa Cupiello (Christmas at the Cupiello's), and it has such success that the engagement was extended for 6 months instead of one week.

Soon, they moved to Sannazzaro and staged there Chi è cchiu' felice 'e me (Who's Happier than Me?), and Amore e balestre (Slings and Loves). Soon Pirandello gave Eduardo the right to adapt Liolà; the play, with Peppino in the title role, had great success. It was followed by several other plays, and Compagnia del Teatro Umoristico I De Filippo gradually grew into one of the most influential theatre companies in the country and was acknowledged as the company that made a revolution in Italian theatre. The protagonists of Eduardo's plays were usually misfortuned, traumatized, and scorned by their closest relatives and friends, but remained full of virtue and human dignity. The pain of the heroes was always taken from life itself and that is why Eduardo's plays resonated with the audience.

In the late 1930s and early 1940s, rising sympathies for fascism in Italian society made the company's work much harder: their performances were often interrupted, and the brothers received multiple threats. In 1936, 1938, and 1941, Eduardo's anti-fascist stance was officially condemned by the Ministry of Internal Affairs. In 1937, he refused to participate in Sabato teatrale ('Theatre Saturday'). In 1944, under the Italian Social Republic, Eduardo and Peppino were included in the list of people to be exiled from Rome to the North.

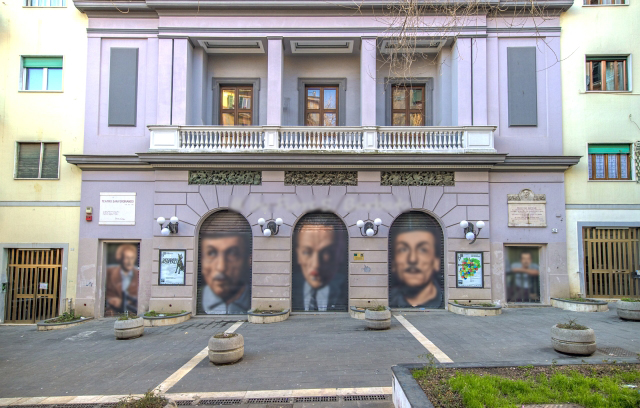
The San Ferdinando in 2018, featuring murals of De Filippo by local artist Jorit

Peppino left the troupe in 1944 due to artistic differences, so in 1945 Eduardo and Titina created Teatro di Eduardo. They debuted in Naples in Teatro San Carlo on 25 March 1945. In 1948, after World War II, Eduardo bought the San Ferdinando Theatre in Naples, which was inaugurated in 1954. However, in 1954 Titina was forced to leave the company and the theatre due to health problems.

In 1962, the company toured in Russia, Poland, Hungary, Austria, and Belgium. In 1967, he presented Il Contratto at the 26th Theatre Festival in Venezia. Also in 1967, his son Luca started playing in his father's company, first under the pseudonym Luca della Porta.

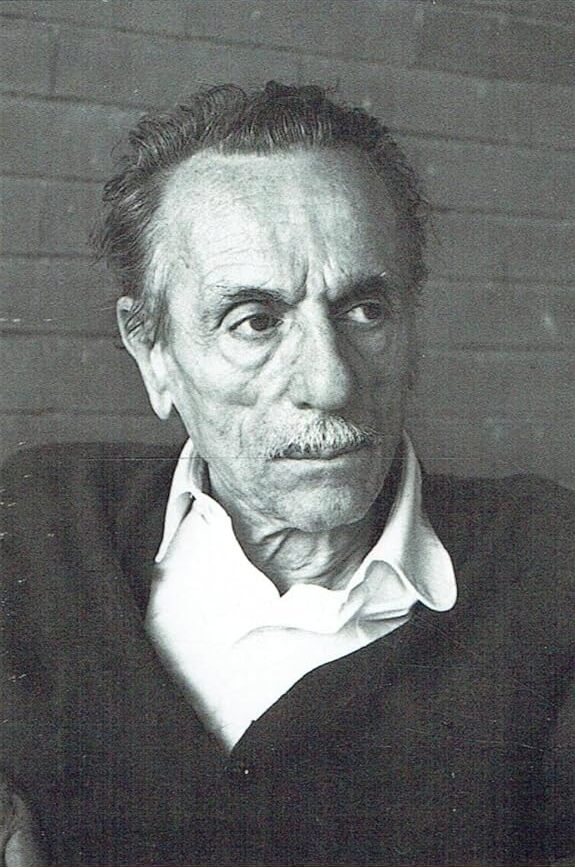
De Filippo c. 1970

In the 1970s, De Filippo went to London; in 1972, he performed his famed play Napoli milionaria (The Millions of Naples). In 1973, Franco Zeffirelli's production of De Filippo's 1959 play Sabato, domenica e lunedì (translated as Saturday, Sunday, Monday), starring Joan Plowright, Frank Finlay, and Laurence Olivier, was presented at London's National Theatre and won the London drama critics' award.

On 18 December 1972, he was honoured with the Antonio Feltrinelli Award for his lifelong contribution to theatrical arts. De Filippo was praised for his poetic approach and unique way of showing drama through comedy: for breaking the limits of a dialect and opening Neapolitan culture to the world.

In January 1980, after several years of struggle, he finally opened his drama school in Florence. In 1981, for "highest achievements in the arts of theatre and literature", he was named senator for life by the President of the Italian Republic Sandro Pertini. In the same year, he was appointed to lead the 1981–82 course of Literature at the Theatre Institute in Rome.

=== Cinema ===
De Filippo first role in cinema was in Mario Bonnard's Three Lucky Fools (Tre uomini in frak).

In 1950, De Filippo filmed Napoli milionaria (Side Street Story), based on his 1945 play. He also starred in Vittorio De Sica's The Gold of Naples (L'oro di Napoli) with Totò and Sophia Loren in 1954. In 1964, Vittorio De Sica made Matrimonio all'Italiana (Marriage Italian Style) based on De Filippo's play Filumena Marturano, with Filumena portrayed by Sophia Loren.

In 1979, Laurence Olivier filmed Filumena with Frank Finlay and Joan Plowright in the lead roles.

De Filippo also discovered the talent of Marina Confalone; in his theatre company, she thrived into a revered Italian actresses of her time.

== Personal life and death ==
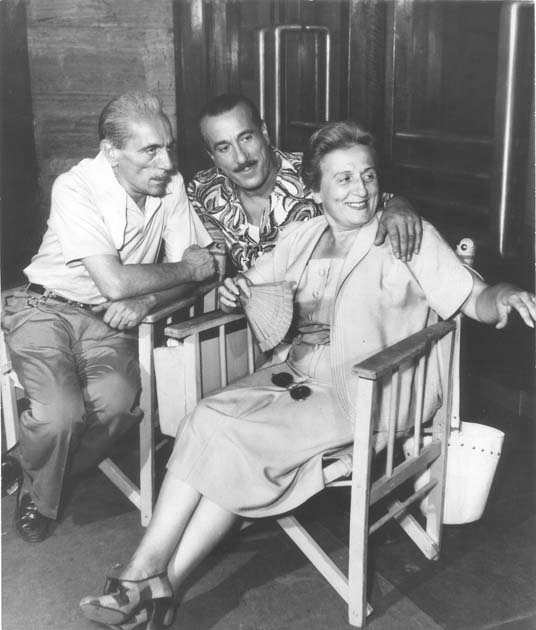
De Filippo (left) with his siblings Peppino and Titina

De Filippo was married three times. His first wife was Dorothy Pennington: they married in 1928 and separated after a few months. In 1954, he married actress Thea Prandi, with whom he already had two children: Luisa "Luisella" and Luca. Luisella played in her father's theatre and showed remarkable talent. The couple separated in 1959.

In early 1960, on Christmas holidays Luisella, stayed with her mother and brother at the Savoia-Belvedere hotel near Rome. On 5 January 1960, she suddenly lost consciousness while playing and died suddenly from a cerebral haemorrhage. De Filippo was at rehearsal when he got the news, and he never fully recovered. Luisella was buried at Verano cemetery. Thea Prandi died in 1961 from a tumour.

On 4 February 1977, De Filippo married writer and playwright Isabella Quarantotti. Actress Angelica Ippolito is his step-daughter, born to Quarantotti and her first husband, scientist Felice Ippolito.

In 1963, De Filippo lost his sister Titina after a long illness. In 1980, his brother Peppino died. Eduardo died of kidney failure on 31 October 1984, in Rome, at the age of 84. His artistic legacy was inherited by his son Luca.

== Works ==
=== Theatre ===
- Farmacia di turno (The All-night Chemist, 1920)
- Uomo e galantuomo (Man and Gentleman, 1922)
- *Requie a l'anema soja/I morti non fanno paura (May his soul rest, 1926)
- Ditegli sempre di sì (Always tell him "yes", 1927)
- Filosoficamente (Philosophically, 1928)
- Sik-sik, l'artefice magico (Sik-sik the magical maker, 1929)
- Chi è cchiu' felice 'e me (Who's Happier than Me?, 1929)
- Quei figuri di trent'anni fa (Those Dudes of 30 Years Ago, 1929)
- Ogni anno punto e da capo (Every Year Back from the Start, 1931)
- È arrivato 'o trentuno (The 31st is Here, 1931)
- Natale in casa Cupiello (Christmas at the Cupiello's, 1931)
- La voce del padrone/Il successo del giorno (Success of the Day, 1932)
- Napoli milionaria (The Millions of Naples, 1945)
- Filumena Marturano (1946)
- Questi fantasmi (These Ghosts, 1946)
- Le voci di dentro (Inner Voices, 1948)
- La grande magia (The Great Magic, 1948)
- La paura numero uno (The Greatest Fear, 1950)
- Mia famiglia (Family of Mine, 1955)
- Bene mio e core mio (My Heart, my Treasure, 1955)
- De Pretore Vincenzo (Vincent De Pretore, 1957)
- Sabato, domenica e lunedì (Saturday, Sunday and Monday, 1959)
- Il sindaco del rione Sanità (Mayor of "Sanità" alley, 1961)
- L'arte della commedia ("The Art of Comedy", 1964)
- Il monumento (The Monument 1970)
- Gli esami non finiscono mai (Exams never end, 1973)

=== Filmography ===
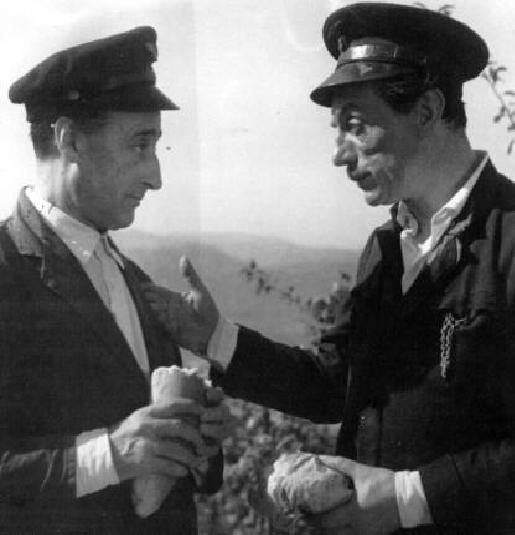
Totò and Eduardo De Filippo in Side Street Story (1950)

- Three Lucky Fools (1933) – Gilberto, l'impresario
- The Three-Cornered Hat (1935) – Don Teofilo, il governatore
- Those Two (1935) – Il professore
- It Was I! (1937) – Giovannino Apicella
- Una Commedia fra i pazzi (1937)
- L'amor mio non muore! (1938) – Lorenzo, il finanziere
- The Marquis of Ruvolito (1939) – Il marchese di Ruvolito
- In the Country Fell a Star (1939) – Pasquale Montuori
- Il sogno di tutti (1940) – Il professore scienziato
- A che servono questi quattrini? (1942) – Il marchese Eduardo Parascandolo
- Non ti pago! (1942) – Don Ferdinando Quagliolo
- After Casanova's Fashion (1942) – Don Ferdinando
- Non mi muovo! (1943) – Don Carlo Mezzetti
- Il fidanzato di mia moglie (1943) – Gaspare Bellini
- Ti conosco, mascherina! (I know you, little Mask!, 1943) – Carmine
- Life Begins Anew (1945) – Il professore
- Uno tra la folla (1946) – Paolo Bianchi
- Assunta Spina (1948) – Michele Boccadifuoco
- Alarm Bells (1949) – Don Andrea
- Yvonne of the Night (1949) – L'avvocato Rubini
- Napoli milionaria (Side Street Story, 1950) – Gennaro Iovine
- Cameriera bella presenza offresi... (1951) – Raffaele, il professore di matematica
- Filumena Marturano (1951) – Domenico Soriano
- Three Girls from Rome (1952) – Vittorio
- Un Ladro in paradiso (1952)
- I sette peccati capitali ( Seven Deadly Sins, 1952) – Eduardo (segment "Avarice et la colère, L' / Avarice and Anger")
- Altri tempi (1952)
- Five Paupers in an Automobile (1952) – Eduardo Moschettone
- Ragazze da marito (Girls to be married, 1952) – Oreste Mazzillo
- Husband and Wife (1952) – Matteo Cuomo / Gennaro Imparato
- Napoletani a Milano (Neapolitans in Milan, 1953) – Salvatore Aianello
- Traviata '53 (1953) – Commendator Cesati
- It Happened in the Park (1953) – Donato Ventrella (segment: Il paraninfo)
- 100 Years of Love (1954) – Soldier Vincenzo Pagliaro (segment "Purificazione")
- Tempi nostri (1954) – Il conduttore
- Questi fantasmi (These Ghosts, 1954)
- The Gold of Naples (1954) – Don Ersilio Miccio (segment "Il professore")
- Cortile (1955) – Luigi
- La canzone del destino (1957)
- Fortunella (Happy-go-lucky Girl, 1958) – Head of the Theater Company
- L'amore più bello (1958) – Gennaro Esposito
- Raw Wind in Eden (1958) – Urbano Varno
- Ferdinando I, re di Napoli (1959) – Pulcinella
- Il sogno di una notte di mezza sbornia (A Midsummer's Hangover Dream, 1959) – Pasquale Grifone
- Everybody Go Home (1960) – Signor Innocenzi
- Ghosts of Rome (1961) – Don Annibale, Principe di Roviano
- The Shortest Day (1963) – Mafioso
- Oggi, domani, dopodomani (Today, Tomorrow and the Day After, 1965) – Driver (segment "L'uomo dei 5 palloni")
- Spara più forte, più forte... non capisco (Shoot louder, I can't hear You, 1966) – Zi Nicola
- Ghosts – Italian Style (1966)
- The Canterbury Tales – voice of the old man in the Pardoner's Tale

== Sources ==
- Fischer, Donatella (2007). Il Teatro di Eduardo de Filippo: La Crisi della Famiglia Patriarcale. New York: Modern Humanities Research Association and Routledge. ISBN 978-1-905981-34-2.
- Ardito, Carlo (1992). De Filippo Four Plays: The Local Authority; Grand Magic; Filumena; Marturano. Bloomsbury Academic. ISBN 9780413666208.
- Farrell, Joseph (2006). A History of Italian Theatre. Cambridge University Press. ISBN 9780521802659.
- Gilbert, Mark; Lamberti Moneta, Sara (2020). Historical Dictionary of Modern Italy. Rowman & Littlefield. ISBN 978-1-5381-0254-1.
- Di Franco, Fiorenza (2000). Eduardo De Filippo. Gremese Editore. ISBN 978-88-7742-448-8.
- Filosa, Carlo (1978). Eduardo de Filippo: poeta comico del tragico quotidiano : saggio su napoletanità e decadentismo nel teatro di Eduardo de Filippo. La nuova cultura.
