= Isabella Quarantotti =

Italian writer

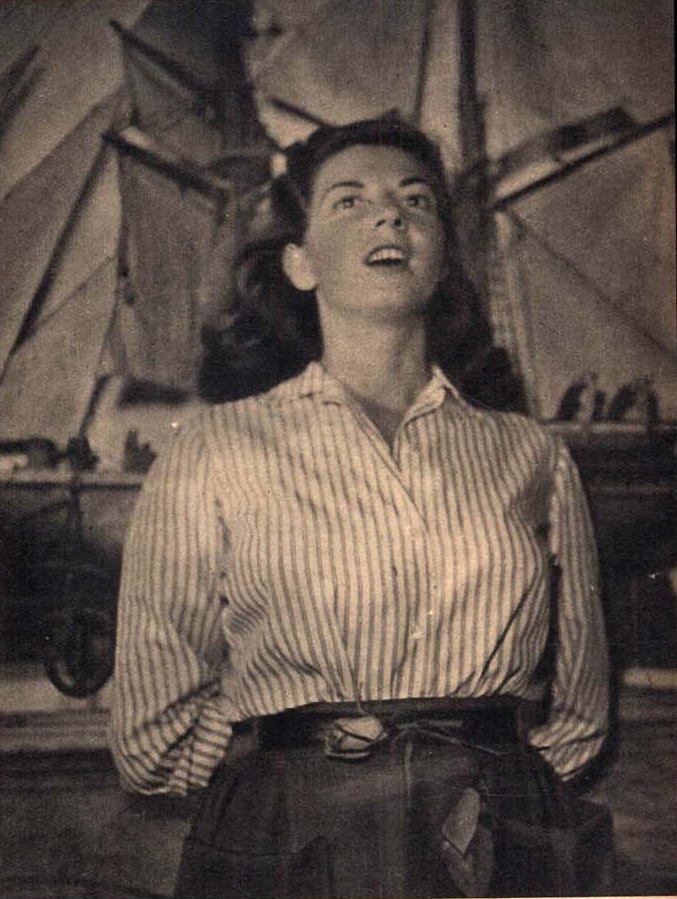
- Quarantotti in 1951
- Born: 1 March 1921; Chieti, Italy
- Died: 18 February 2005 (aged 83); Milan, Italy
- Occupation: Writer

Isabella Quarantotti (1 March 1921 – 18 February 2005) was an Italian writer, translator, and playwright.

== Life and career ==
Born in Chieti into a wealthy family, Quarantotti was orphaned at a young age and grew up with her grandparents. After studying philosophy and law at the University of Naples Federico II, she left her studies to work as an actress at Anton Giulio Bragaglia's Teatro delle Arti in Rome.

In 1941, Quarantotti married geologist Felice Ippolito, with whom she had a daughter, Angelica, who later became an actress. Shortly afterward, their marriage was annulled, and in 1946, Quarantotti started a relationship with English poet Alexander Ronald Smith, whom she married in 1955. In 1956, with her marriage in crisis, she moved to Milan: there she started working as a columnist for the Mondadori magazines Grazia ed Epoca and as a translator of American and British authors, including E. M. Forster, Paddy Chayefsky, Thomas Dekker, Angus Wilson, and Ray Bradbury. Also in 1956, she began a professional collaboration with playwright Eduardo De Filippo, with whom she later started a relationship; following her divorce in 1965, the two eventually married in 1977.

In 1957, Quarantotti penned her first novel, Stella del Sud. In 1960, she won the Premio Rieti for the short story Lo schiaffo, that was later adapted into a comedy play and a successful RAI television miniseries, Peppino Girella. In 2003, she won the Mondello Prize for the autobiographical novel In mezzo al mare un’isola c’è. She was also a television writer, screenwriter, stage director, and a literary critic, and in her later years she ran a theatre company consisting of inmates in the Rebibbia prison.
