= OYLA =

Kazakh children's popular science magazine

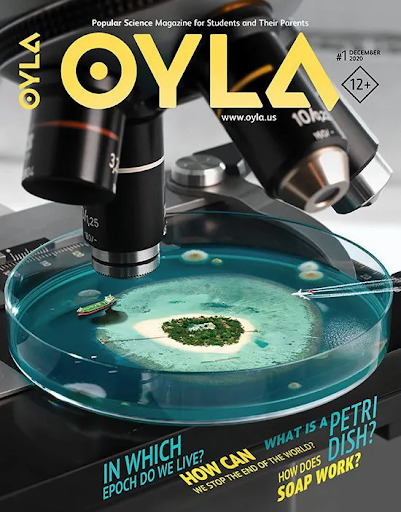
- Cover of the first US edition, December 2020
- Editor: Gamzat Biyarov
- Categories: Children's Magazine, Education, STEM, Science, Reading, History, Nature
- Frequency: Monthly
- Publisher: OYLA Magazine Inc.
- Total circulation: 25,000
- Founder: Yerdos Tulegenov, Gamzat Biyarov
- First issue: September 1, 2015
- Based in: Almaty, Kazakhstan
- Language: English, Kazakh, Russian, Chinese, French, Korean, German, Spanish
- Website: oyla.us oyla.uk oyla.eu oyla.co.in oyla.au
- ISSN: 2766-886X

OYLA (from Kazakh ойла! [ojˈlɑ], meaning ‘think!’’) is a monthly science magazine for children and young readers ages 12 and over. Founded on the principle of fostering curiosity, OYLA's mission is to simplify complex STEM topics through visually engaging designs, interactive infographics, and interdisciplinary content. Published in multiple countries, including the USA, UK, Australia, and China, the magazine combines science, technology, engineering, mathematics, and humanities with the goal of making learning accessible and exciting for young minds worldwide. The magazine is available in both print and digital format. Alongside the magazine, OYLA publishes a companion workbook of experiments and open-ended activities tied to each issue's articles since 2026.

The first issue of OYLA was published on September 1, 2015 by founders Yerdos Tulegenov and Gamzat Biyarov in Almaty, Kazakhstan. Each edition features articles on various scientific topics, ranging from basic questions (Why is Milk White?) to recent discoveries (Ocean Exploration Technology). The magazine also produces a weekly English-language podcast featuring discussions about topics from the current month’s edition.

The magazine is subscription-based, and each issue is available in both print and online formats. Every issue contains 100 illustrated pages and explanations.To date, the magazine is available in sixteen countries and is published in a total of six languages, including Kazakh, Russian, Chinese, and English.

== History ==
OYLA first launched in Kazakhstan in 2015. Since April 2017, the OYLA Youth Science magazine has been published monthly in Australia and New Zealand. Since June 2018, CHIP Wissen has been published bi-monthly in Germany, Austria, and Switzerland in German. Since November 2018 OYLA has been published bi-monthly in India in English. Since September 2019, the magazine comes out monthly in Russia under the name DUMAI. In December 2020, the magazine launched in the United Kingdom. The magazine comes out in France under the name À nous la Science. The first issue of the US edition of OYLA was published in December 2020. In January 2024, the magazine launched in the People's Republic of China. On October 4, 2023, Oyla began an English-language podcast, which is ranked 36 in the all time top 100 educational podcasts for kids.

== OYLA Junior ==
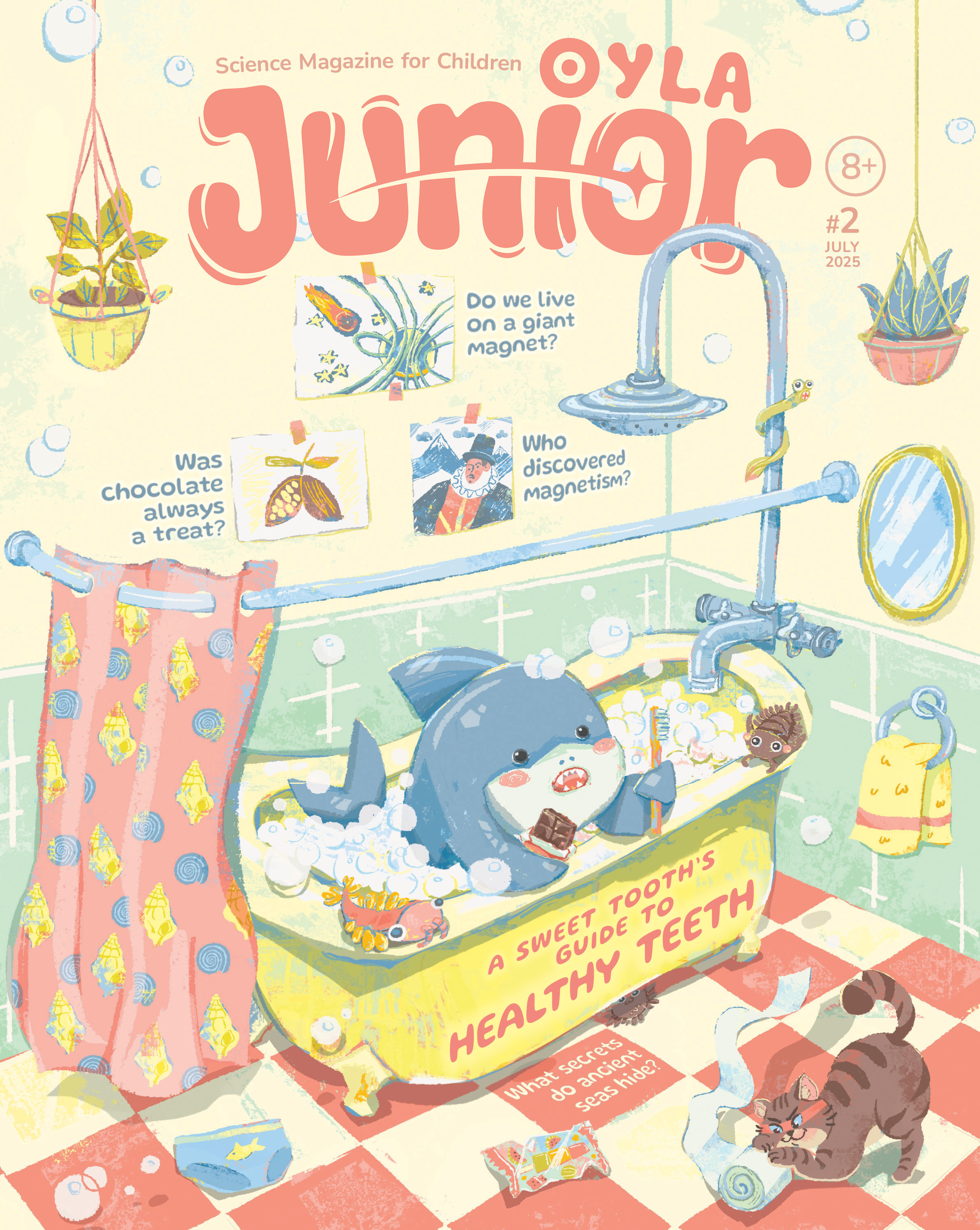
This is the cover of OYLA Junior magazine, Issue #2 (July 2025), designed for children aged 8 and above. The theme blends fun and science, featuring a whimsical bathroom scene where a cute, cartoonish shark with candy teeth bathes in a tub, eating chocolate while surrounded by soap bubbles and sea creatures. The main headline reads: “A Sweet Tooth’s Guide to Healthy Teeth”.

In May 2025, OYLA launched second publication titled “OYLA Junior”. Aimed at readers aged 8 to 11, the magazine features approximately 48 pages of illustrated science content, hands-on activities, and puzzles. Like its parent publication, OYLA Junior is ad-free and focuses on fostering curiosity in STEM topics through visual storytelling and age-appropriate explanations. As of its launch, the magazine is available in print format, with a digital edition planned for future release.

== OYLA Workbook ==
OYLA also produces the OYLA Workbook, a companion publication issued alongside the magazine. Aimed at the same twelve-and-over readership, the workbook is designed to extend the articles of the parent magazine into hands-on activity and is built on the principle that scientific understanding develops through active engagement rather than passive reading.

Each issue offers experiments and demonstrations intended to be reproduced at home using ordinary household materials. The workbook is organized around two main components. The first is a set of experiments and observation tasks that translate abstract concepts from an article into a physical setup. The second is a section of active-learning questions. The tasks are deliberately structured so that they cannot be delegated to a AI, emphasizing direct contact with real materials. Completed works in form of photographs, drawings, crafts and diagrams can be uploaded to a gallery on the OYLA website, where a curated selection is chosen for publication.

== OYLA Podcast ==
On October 4, 2023, OYLA launched the “OYLA Podcast”, a weekly educational series designed for curious young listeners and families. Each episode runs approximately 6–12 minutes and explores engaging science, history, or math topics. Initial episodes included titles such as “Why is it dark at night?” and “Who taught doctors to wash their hands?” The podcast is available on major platforms, including Apple Podcasts, Goodpods, and Spotify.

In late 2023, the OYLA Podcast was ranked #36 in the all-time Top 100 Educational Podcasts for Kids."Top 100 Educational Podcasts for Kids". Goodpods.

== Language Editions ==
Language	Country	Website	Circulation
French	France		10,000
Kazakh, Russian	Kazakhstan		25,000
English	Australia, New Zealand		15,000
Korean	South Korea	n/a	12,000
German	Germany, Austria, Switzerland		150,000
English	India		20,000
Russian	Russia		35,000
English	United Kingdom		15,000
English	United States of America		10,000
Chinese	China	n/a	20,000

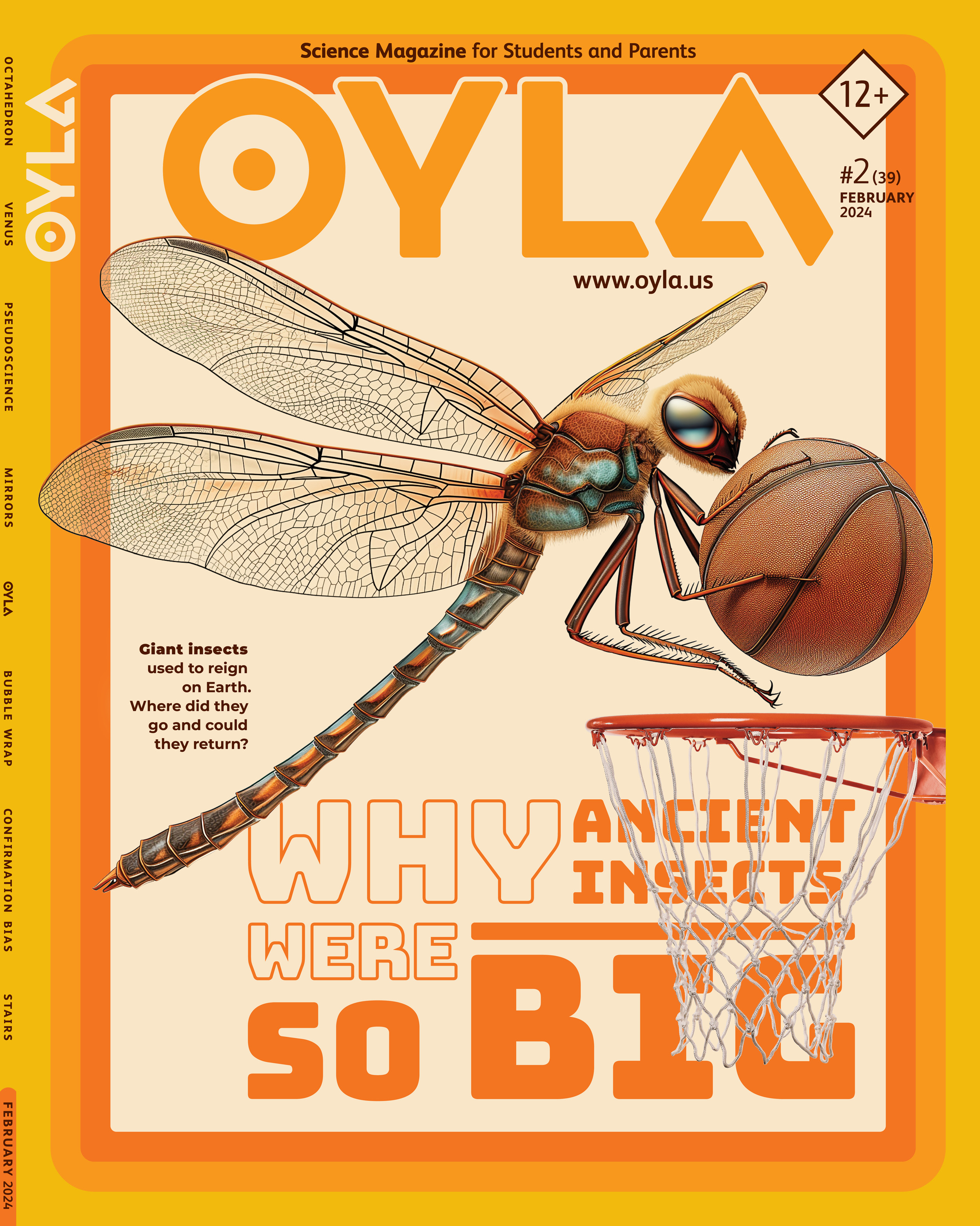
This issue features a stylized illustration of a giant prehistoric insect playing basketball, symbolizing the cover story: “Why Ancient Insects Were So Big”. The artwork reflects the magazine’s signature blend of science and visual creativity, designed to engage students and parents in scientific exploration. Published for ages 12+, OYLA Magazine combines topics in biology, physics, and critical thinking with striking visual design.

== Awards and recognition ==
OYLA is a highly rated children's magazine, having been included in the list of The New York Times favorite kids magazines. In 2023 chief editor Gamzat Biyarov and art director Alexander Fisher were recognized by the British Society of Magazine Editors on the short lists in their respective categories. In 2024 chief editor Gamzat Biyarov was again recognized for in the category of children's magazine editors. The magazine has also collaborated with National Oceanic and Atmospheric Administration Ocean Exploration to produce a series of articles on maritime exploration.

== Gallery ==
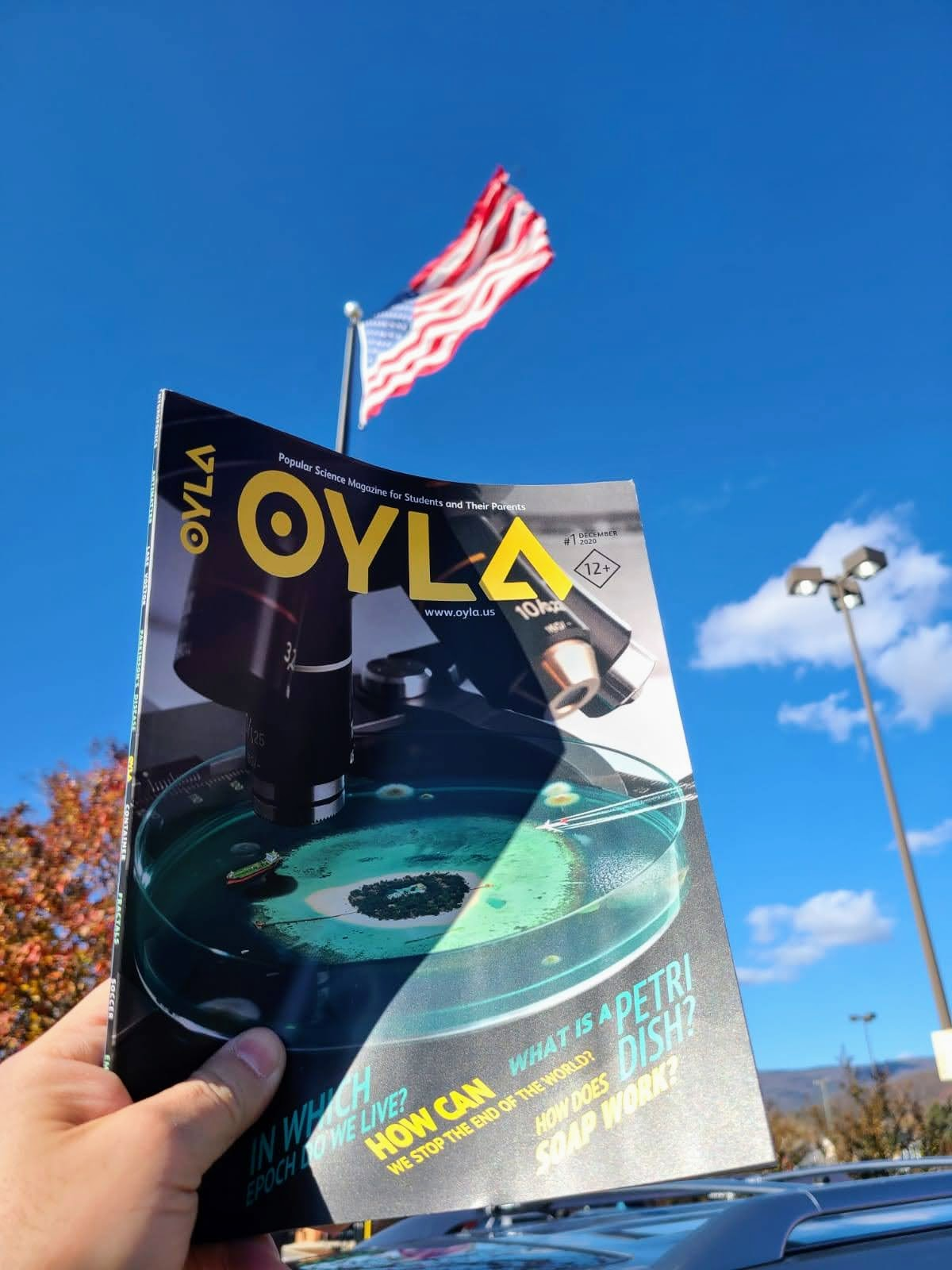
The first American edition of OYLA was published in December 2020.

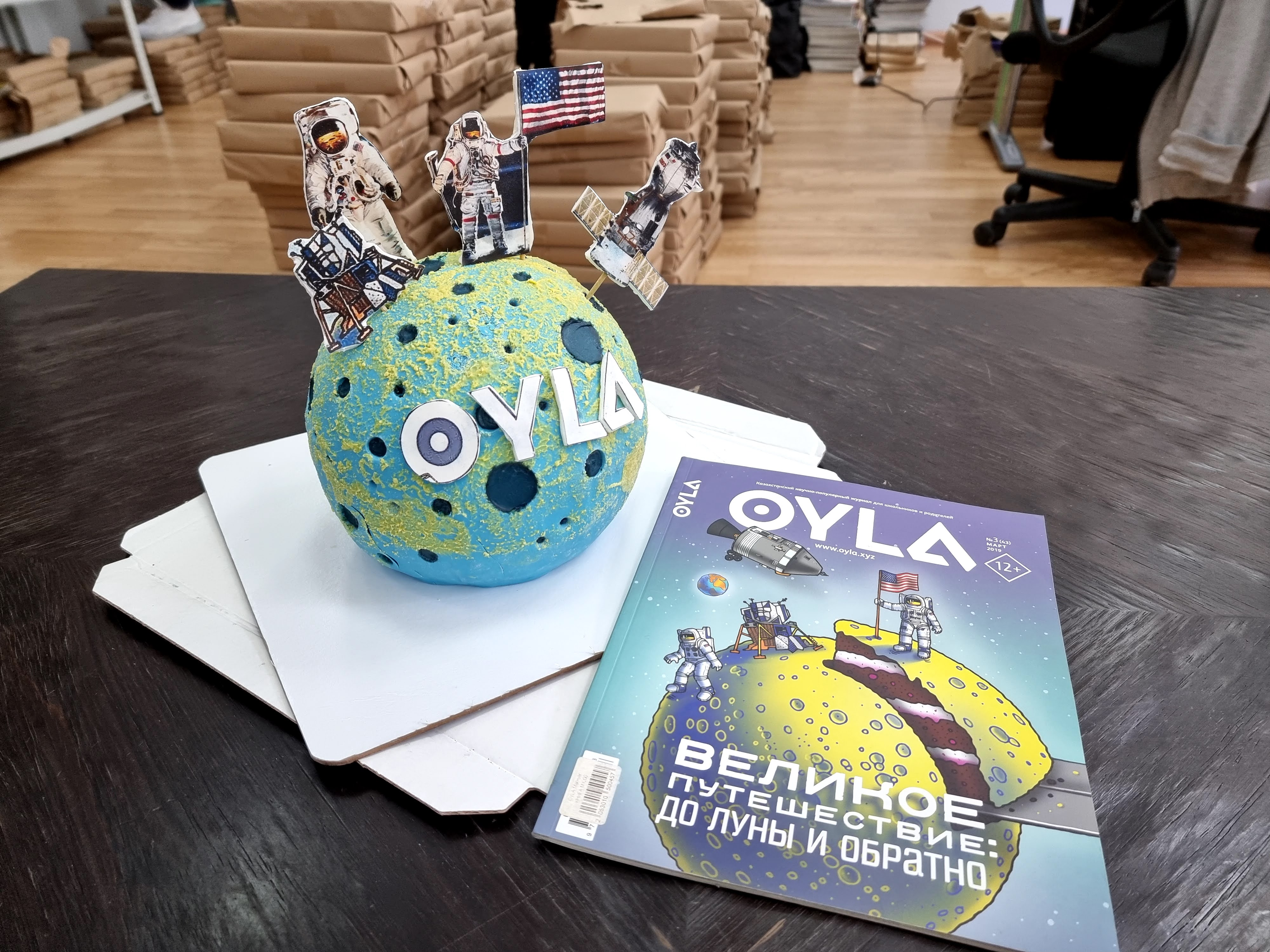
Special edition of OYLA, published in 2019 to commemorate the 50th anniversary of the Apollo 11 Moon landing.

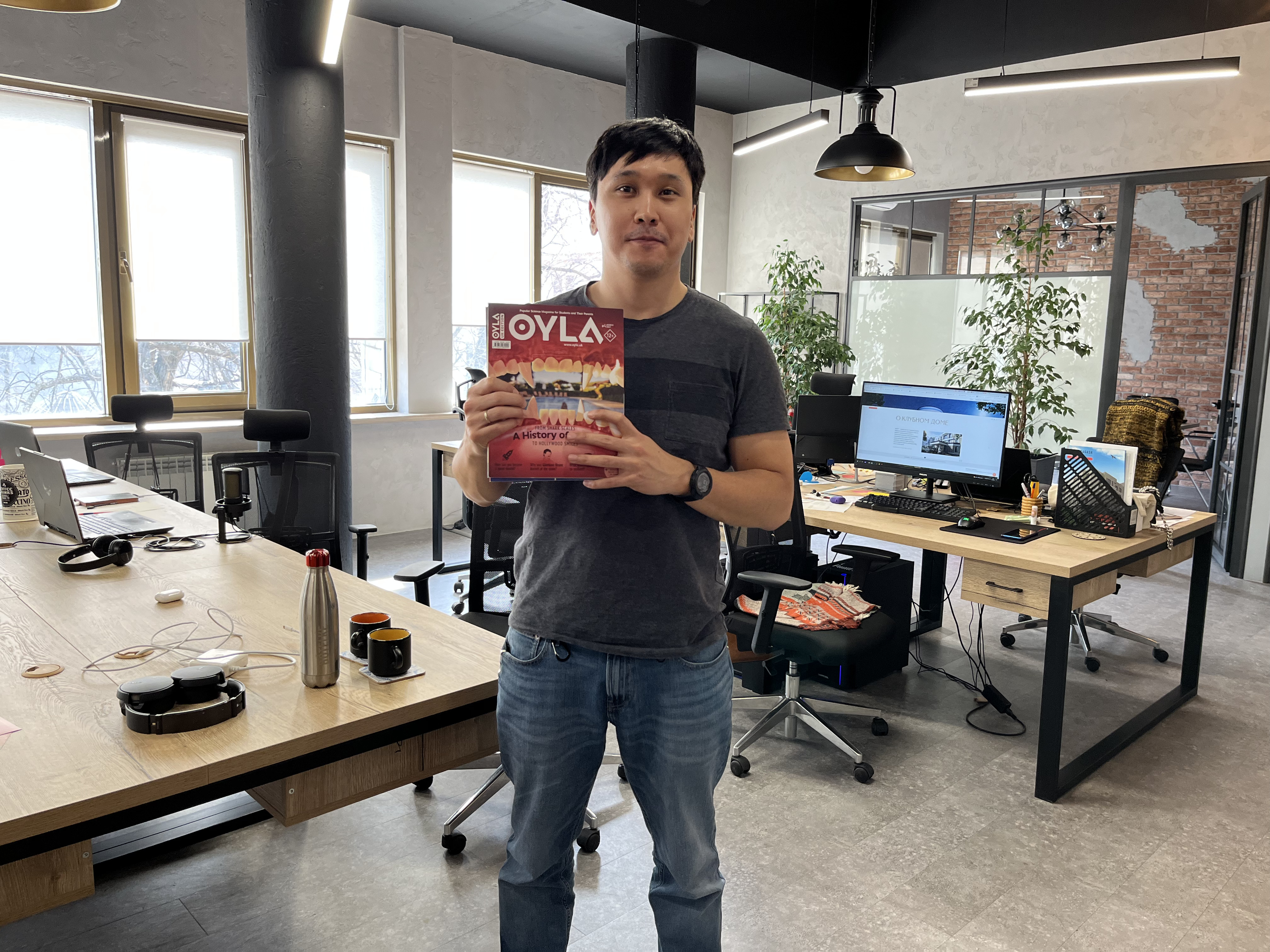
Gamzat Biyarov, Chief Editor of OYLA, at the magazine’s editorial office, 2024.
