= Yuri Nesterenko (footballer, born 1956) =

Russian footballer and coach

Personal information
- Full name: Yuri Vladimirovich Nesterenko
- Date of birth: May 18, 1956 (age 70)
- Place of birth: Kharkiv, Soviet Union
- Position: Defender

Senior career*
Years	Team	Apps	(Gls)
1975	FC Metalist Kharkiv	11	(0)
1976–1978	FC Zvezda Perm		

Managerial career
- 1992: FC Torpedo Adler
- 1994–1997: FC Zhemchuzhina Sochi (assistant)
- 2000: FC Zhemchuzhina Sochi (assistant)
- 2001: FC Kuzbass-Dynamo Kemerovo
- 2002: FC Avtomobilist Noginsk
- 2003: FC Zhemchuzhina Sochi (assistant)
- 2004: FC Tobol Kurgan (assistant)
- 2005: FC SKA Rostov-on-Don (assistant)
- 2006: FC Kuzbass-Dynamo Kemerovo (director)
- 2008: FC Zhemchuzhina Sochi
- 2009: FC Kavkaztransgaz-2005 Ryzdvyany
- 2009–2010: FC Taganrog
- * Club domestic league appearances and goals as of 19:06, 15 September 2009 (UTC)

Yuri Vladimirovich Nesterenko (Russian: Юрий Владимирович Нестеренко; born May 18, 1956) is a Russian professional football coach and a former player. In 2010, he managed FC Taganrog.
