= George Yury Right =

Russian-American writer, political and antisexual activist

- Юрий Леонидович Нестеренко
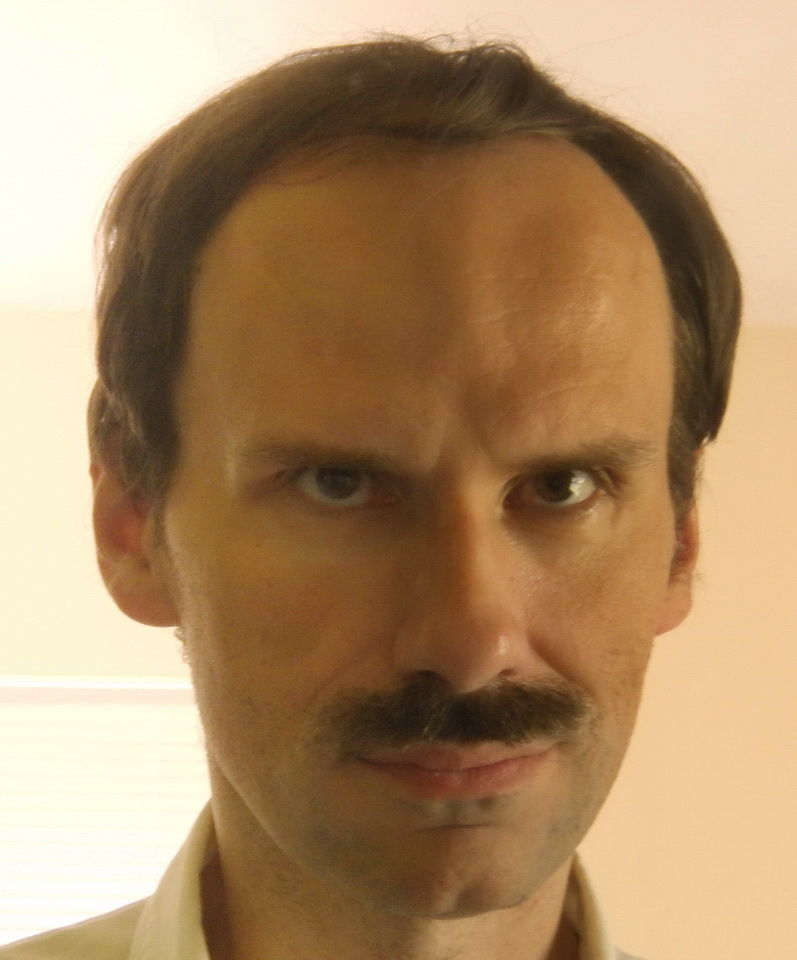
- Born: Юрий Леонидович Нестеренко; Yuri Leonidovich Nesterenko; October 9, 1972 (age 53); Moscow, Soviet Union
- Citizenship: United States and Russia
- Education: Master's degree
- Alma mater: Moscow Institute of Engineering Physics
- Occupations: Novelist, poet, short story person
- Writing career
- Pen name: YuN, Count Etsenberg, Yury Nesterenko
- Language: Russian, English, German
- Genres: Science fiction, fantasy, horror. literary fiction. non-fiction
- Subjects: Antisexualism, misanthropy
- Website: yun.complife.info

George Yury Right (born Yuri Leonidovich Nesterenko; Russian: Юрий Леонидович Нестеренко, IPA: [ˈjʉrʲɪj lʲɪɐˈnʲidəvʲɪtɕ nʲɪsʲtʲɪˈrʲenkə]; born October 9, 1972) is a Russian American writer and antisexual activist.

== Biography ==
He graduated from the Moscow Institute of Engineering Physics with an honors degree in 1995. He asked the US for political asylum in 2010, which was granted to him in 2011.

After receiving United States citizenship, he changed his name to George Yury Right.

== Fiction, stories and poems ==
Nesterenko has written numerous books published by the leading publishing companies of Russia (Eksmo, AST, and others). He also has contributed to many magazines, including "Nauka i Zhizn" ("Наука и жизнь", "Science and Life"), "Khimiya i Zhizn" ("Химия и жизнь", "Chemistry and Life"), "Mir Fantastiki" ("Мир фантастики", "The world of science fiction"), "Igromania" ("Игромания"), "Tekhnika Molodezhi" ("Техника — молодёжи", "Technology for the Youth"), "Reality of Fiction" ("Реальность фантастики"), "Rural Youth" ("Сельская молодёжь"). Also, his fiction was published in the collections "Russian Fantasy – 2006" ("Русская фантастика – 2006"), "Fantasy – 2007" ("Фэнтези – 2007"), "Russian Fantasy – 2007" ("Русская фантастика – 2007"), "Russian Fantasy Action – 2007" ("Русский фантастический боевик – 2007"), "Fantasy 2008" ("Фэнтези 2008"), "Russian Fantasy – 2008" ("Русская фантастика – 2008"), "Russian Fantasy – 2009" ("Русская фантастика – 2009"), "Russian Fantasy – 2010" ("Русская фантастика – 2010"), "Fantasy – 2010" ("Фэнтези – 2010"), "Russian Fantasy – 2011" ("Русская фантастика – 2011"; publishing house Eksmo), "Steps Into the Unknown – 2011" ("Kroki w nieznane – 2011"; "Solaris", Poland), "The Burden of the Prophet" ("Бремя пророка"; publishing house "Млечный Путь" – "Milky Way"), "The Programmer and the Butterfly" ("Программист и бабочка"; publishing house "Млечный Путь" – "Milky Way"), "The Gentle Embrace of the Iron Virgin" ("Нежные объятия железной девы"; publishing house "Млечный Путь" – "Milky Way"), "We Love the Earth" ("Me armastame Maad" – "Fantaasia", Estonia). Kroki w nieznane series (Poland) published a Polish translation of Nesterenko's story Despair in 2011.

Humorous works were published in the magazines "Computerra", "UPgrade", "New Crocodile" ("Новый крокодил"), "Igromania" and many others.

The non-fiction stories and poems were published in the magazines "On an Amateur" ("На любителя" – a Russian literary journal in Atlanta, GA, USA), "The Obvious and Incredible" ("Очевидное и невероятное"), "Porog" ("Порог", "Threshold" – Ukraine), "Salon" ("Салон" – Ukraine), "The Moscow Herald" ("Московский вестник"), "Слово/Word" (United States), "Meetings" ("Встречи"), "Floriда" (United States), "Krugozor" ("Mental Outlook" – a Russian journal in Boston, MA, USA), "Journal of the Fresh Literature" ("Журнал свежей литературы").

== Computer programming ==
Having a master's degree in computer science, Nesterenko has created several non-commercial computer games, including FIDO (one of the first Russian life sims devoted to a life of a Fidonet user). This game was very popular in the 1990s. He was also one of the script co-authors of several commercial Russian games, including Space Rangers and Space Rangers 2.

== Views on human sexuality ==
External videos
- Yu. Nesterenko, Sergei Agarkov, T.Arno, and others
- Теория невероятности. Жизнь без секса ("Life without Sex," ORT's documentary)

Nesterenko is a proponent of antisexualism and is one of the founders of the International Antisexual Movement (IAM). The IAM advocates for ending sexual relations throughout the world. It was Yuri Nesterenko who established the first Antisexual Society in Russia (1995) Since then, he has taken a leading role in the IAM. The main venue of the society is the "Anti-sexual Stronghold" website created by Nesterenko. The group accepts the minimum amount of sexual activity necessary to maintain population, but the founder hasn't updated it in quite a while.

Nesterenko is an atheist and his pro-chastity views do not come from religious belief. According to him, sexual drive is similar to drug addiction because a common addictive element is present in the two behaviours. Nesterenko calls upon every person to make use of his own reason and to see that it is necessary to reject sexual relations. Any sex other than that strictly for reproduction places animal passions over the development of the highest powers human possesses. That is why Nesterenko opposes it. He is not opposed to all emotions. There is nothing bad in feeling satisfaction from, for instance, a well-done job, either admiring or producing artwork, or intellectual communication. But emotions that originate in primitive instincts and fog the mind really must not exist.

Yu. L. Nesterenko's attitude to David Jay presents special interest. His own ideas had already been formed in the main when AVEN's website was launched in 2002. On the whole he highly appreciates Jay's work, ascribing to him the credit of having set forth with the idea that sexual indifference is not in need of medical treatment. Later, however, there began to be serious disagreements. Nesterenko's stance is, first of all, much more radical than Jay's. When comparing the IAM and asexual people, Russian journalists give particular emphasis to the difference that the ideological position of the IAM's leader is militantly anti-sexual. Nesterenko not only considers asexuality a normal state, but also condemns all the forms of hedonistic sexual activity. In contrast to a conciliatory character of AVEN's attitude to the LGBT community, Nesterenko's efforts as an anti-sexual ideologist are not directed to looking for a fourth way between the three sexual orientations, viz., heterosexuality, homosexuality, and bisexuality. He stresses in every way possible that the IAM is not a new variety of sexual minorities just as anti-fascists do not constitute a particular stream in fascism. When asked the question "But you're a minority, aren't you?" Nesterenko said: "If we take a psychiatric hospital, we find that medical staff is a minority there, too."

In the middle of the 2000s, the moulding of the IAM attracted the attention of Russian and foreign mass media. Nesterenko was interviewed by journalists and bloggers, articles about his anti-sexual views appearing in central newspapers and magazines of Russia and the CIS. He was also featured on Russian television shows including TV programmes of Channel One and NTV. Nesterenko himself is not very happy with these shows. He says that they give a superficial and tendentious survey of the IAM. In his opinion, these attempts at a description of asexual people's ways of life (always with an obvious pro-sexual twist) are preconceived and not objective, with his real views being a bit distorted.

== Political and religious views ==
Nesterenko describes himself as atheist, individualist, anti-communist, anti-Islamist and the opponent of any collectivist and dogmatic doctrines. He is consistent critic of anti-democratic regimes existed throughout Russian history, including Putin's Russia. Nesterenko was the participant of the Strategy-31 and one of the signers of the petition Putin Must Go.

In 2010, Nesterenko published an article entitled "Exodus", where he expressed the view that Russia is constantly reproducing authoritarian and totalitarian regimes on its territory and any attempts at democratization of Russia are doomed to failure. The reason for this lies in the slavish mentality of the Russians who, in his view, proud of their disempowered position, worship tyrants and despotism (which did not preclude the possibility of deceiving the state for private purposes), hate peoples sharing the values of the human rights, the priority of the individual over the state, democracy and rule of law. Nesterenko believes that the Russians had freedom in the 1990s, but they gave up it and it was their deliberate choice.

Russia is evil. Russia is evil in its pure, ultimate form.

— Yuri Nesterenko, in article "Exodus"

Nesterenko supports Georgia in the Russo-Georgian War and Ukraine in the Russo-Ukrainian War.

== Views on race ==
Nesterenko is an open proponent of racism. He defends his stance in the article entitled "Racism is bad? Can you prove it"?, where he defines racism as a "concept, according to which (human) races are not equal by certain significant (biologically ground) properties which can be objectively assessed in 'better – worse' terms" (e.g., on average, blacks are better in some kinds of sports while whites are better in intellectual tasks). Nesterenko states that this definition is just "an acknowledgement of the fact" and does not automatically justify any hatred or aggression against the race with worse properties. Among other things, he claims racism can be scientifically proven to be rational because of the low IQ of blacks, higher black criminality and lack of great civilizations (equal to the ones created by white and yellow races) built by blacks. He names a racist booklet "Whites & Blacks. 100 FACTS (and one Lie)", which he has on his site, as one of his sources.

== Views on COVID-19 ==
While not denying the danger of the disease, Right is an active opponent of wearing face masks (especially when it is made mandatory), insisting that masks are both unnecessary and ineffective against the pandemic and humiliating to human dignity. He promotes this concept in his articles and videos.

== Main works ==
- Чёрная нежить = [Black Undead] – М.: Эксмо-Пресс, 2002 – ISBN 5-04-009307-1.
- Время меча: Фантастический роман. = [Time of the Sword: a fantastic novel] – М.: АРМАДА: «Издательство Альфа-книга», 2002 – ISBN 5-93556-207-3.
- Комитет по встрече (сборник). = [The Meeting Committee (collection)] – М.: АСТ, 2003 – ISBN 5-17-015484-4.
- Крылья: Фантастический роман. = [Wings: a fantastic novel] – М.: Эксмо, 2004 – ISBN 5-699-07409-0.
- Пилот с Границы: Фантастический роман. = [The Pilot from the Frontiers: a fantastic novel] – М.: Эксмо, 2006 – ISBN 5-699-15255-5.
- Плющ на руинах: Фантастический роман. = [Ivy on the Ruins: a fantastic novel] – М.: Эксмо, 2007 – ISBN 978-5-699-22100-4.
- Личная неприкосновенность: Фантастический роман. = [The Personal Integrity: a fantastic novel] – М.: Эксмо, 2009 – ISBN 978-5-699-35850-2.
- «Объяснение»: Стихи 1987–2010 гг. = ["Explanation": Poems 1987–2010], 2011 – ISBN 978-1-257-82612-4.
- Вторжение (сборник). = [Invasion (collection)] – Иерусалим: «Млечный Путь», 2011 – ISBN 978-965-7546-07-9.
- Приговор: Роман. = [The sentence: a novel] – Дюссельдорф: Za-Za Verlag, 2015 – ISBN 978-1-326-24476-7.
- «Я не вернусь»: Стихи 2010–2018 гг. = ["I will not be back": Poems 2010–2018], 2018 – ISBN 978-1-986603-37-9.
- Рукопись, не найденная никогда: Поэма, 2018 – ISBN 978-1-986740-30-2.
