= Sandarbh =

Hindi science and education magazine

Sandarbh is a bimonthly magazine on science and education in Hindi published since September, 1994 in Bhopal, India. It is published by Eklavya foundation, a non-profit, non-governmental organization that focuses on children's education. Sandarbh primarily serves as a resource on a variety of topics for teachers and students in primary, middle, and high schools.

In addition to feature articles, analyses of curricula and pedagogies, reviews of text-books and children's literature, biographies, interviews, teacher's experiences, and fiction also find space in the magazine. In every issue there is also an attempt to publish answers to questions in science sent in by readers - Sawaliram. The magazine covers articles on various topics in education, social studies art, literature, language, botany, zoology, evolution, chemistry, physics and mathematics. Articles published in this magazine are written in a relatively casual, non-textbook style without compromising on accuracy and rigour. Sandarbh means 'context' in Hindi, and the articles provide a relevant context for learning topics covered in schools in India.

== History ==
The idea of a magazine in Hindi that could serve the needs of teachers and students in schools was first conceived in the early '90s. Members of the Eklavya foundation had been part of a pioneering science education programme in over 1000 middle schools in Hoshangabad and other districts of Madhya Pradesh, known as the Hoshangabad Science Teaching Programme (HSTP). To provide a platform for teachers and resource persons associated with HSTP, a bulletin was started in 1983. Based on their experiences over many years in science teaching and the HSTP Bulletin, many felt that such material should be available to teachers and those interested in education, also those outside HSTP.

The magazine was initially supported by the Indian Ministry of Human Resource Development, under its Science Improvement Scheme. In subsequent years subscriptions have covered the publishing costs of Sandarbh with support from Eklavya's other programmes when necessary.

== Readership ==
The nearly 7000 subscribers of Sandarbh consist of school and college teachers, teacher educators, some students as well as general readers. While most of the subscribers reside in the Hindi speaking states of India, some are scattered across the country.

== Articles and contributors ==
Contributing writers to Sandarbh come from all over the country. They also include members of the editorial team of the magazine and resource persons associated with various Eklavya programmes. While many write in Hindi, articles submitted in English and other languages are also translated and published. The majority of articles published in Sandarbh are written for the magazine. A smaller but significant number come from other publications. They tend to be articles that may be interesting and useful to Sandarbh readers but which, for various reasons, may be beyond their reach. Likewise, articles from Sandarbh are carried by other publications, both in Hindi and other languages.

== Sandarbh in other Indian languages ==
In 1998, a Pune-based organization "Palak Neeti" began publishing Shaikshanik Sandarbh in Marathi. Till now 74 issues of this magazine have been published. Since 2003, 21 issues of Sandarbh have also been published in Gujarati by "Arch Vahini" in Dharampur, Gujarat. They are both independent, fraternal ventures that collaborate with the Hindi Sandarbh on magazine content.
