= Dream 2047 =

Indian monthly popular science magazine

- Editor: Nakul Parashar
- Associate editor: Rintu Nath
- Categories: Popular science
- Frequency: Monthly
- Circulation: Over fifty thousand
- Publisher: Vigyan Prasar
- Founded: 1998
- Country: India
- Language: Hindi and English
- Website: www.vigyanprasar.gov.in
- ISSN: 0972-169X

Dream 2047 is a monthly popular science magazine published by Vigyan Prasar, an autonomous institution under Department of Science and Technology, Government of India. The magazine has over fifty thousand subscribers. It is sent free to schools, colleges and individuals interested in science and technology communication.

- Bilingual science magazine published in Hindi and English
- Vigyan Prasar has published Dream 2047 for last 18 years
- The magazine is primarily used as resource materials for science communicators and teachers.
