= Welt der Physik =

Science magazine in Germany

Welt der Physik is a scientific magazine in German language analogous to New Scientist. The magazine was started in 2003. It is based in Hamburg.
