= Laboratory News =

British magazine

- Laboratory News July 2011
- Editor: Sarah Lawton
- Categories: Science & Technology
- Frequency: Monthly
- First issue: 1971
- Company: Synthesis Media Ltd
- Country: United Kingdom
- Language: English
- Website: labnews.co.uk
- ISSN: 0266-7169

Laboratory News is a monthly science magazine aimed at scientists with a focus on laboratory equipment. Founded in 1971, the magazine covers all aspects of scientific discovery and advances in the laboratory sector. Laboratory News has two websites associated with the publication which contains news, features, comments, new products for the laboratory industry, and events; and allows users to search for products and services relevant to the laboratory industry.

== Regular content ==
- News – Highlights from the past month in science;
- Editorial comment – Personal insights into developments and trends;
- The Big Ask – a Q&A session with the people behind the science;
- Laboratology – lighthearted insight into research
- Lab Babble – comment from regular columnist;
- Features – Indepth articles on new methods, techniques, equipment and trends;
- Science Allsorts – competitions, lighthearted look at things to do, read and see;
- Products – A directory of new products for the laboratory industry;
- Classified – Advertisements for products and services;
- Competitions – Including a crossword and sudoku;
- Game Theory – A review of a science board or card game
