= Khimiya i Zhizn =

Russian popular science magazine

Химия и жизнь
- Categories: Chemistry
- First issue: April 1965
- Country: Russia
- Language: Russian
- Website: [hij.ru]

Khimiya i Zhizn – XXI Vek (Russian: "Химия и жизнь – XXI век", Chemistry and Life – 21st Century) is a Russian popular scientific monthly magazine, known as simply Khimiya i Zhizn during Soviet times.

The first issue of the magazine was published in April, 1965, with the circulation of 12,500. Lately this figure reached 150,000. Since 1997 the magazine is known as Khimiya i Zhizn – XXI Vek.
