= Felice Ippolito =

Italian geologist, engineer and politician

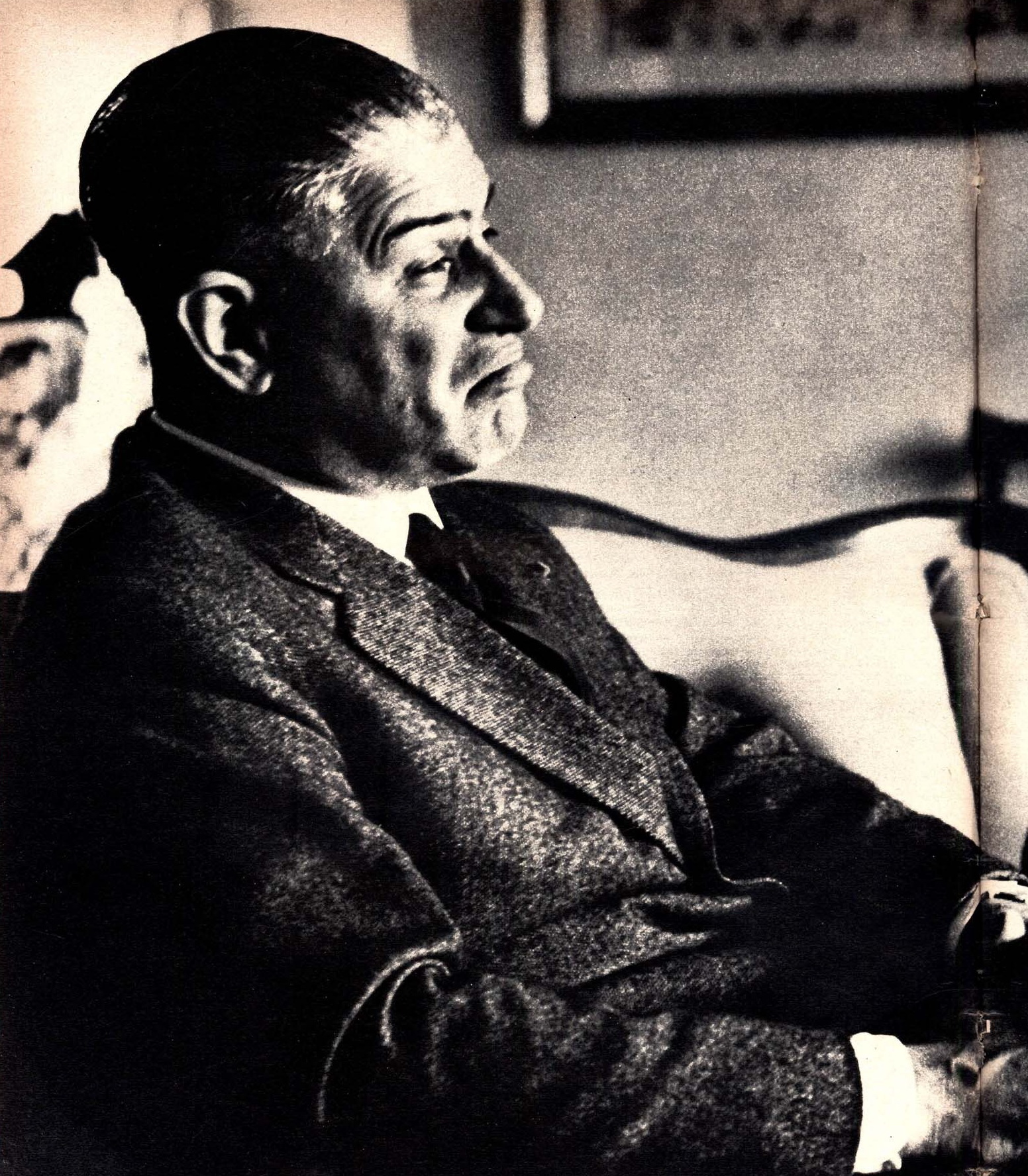
- Born: 16 November 1915; Naples, Italy
- Died: 24 April 1997 (aged 81); Rome, Italy
- Occupation: Geologist
- Political party: Radical (1955–1963); SI (1979–1989); PRI (1989–1997)

Felice Ippolito (16 November 1915 – 24 April 1997) was an Italian geologist, politician and engineer. He was a fiery promoter of the development of nuclear energy in Italy. His daughter is the actress Angelica Ippolito.

== Biography ==
Born in Naples, Ippolito graduated in civil engineering with a specialization in geology in 1938, and in 1950 he became Professor of Applied Geology at the University of Naples Federico II. Interested in the use of civil nuclear energy because of his research on uranium as a geologist, in 1952 he became General Secretary for the use of nuclear energy, became in 1960 the Comitato nazionale per l'Energia Nucleare (CNEN), the predecessor of ENEA. In this role, he contributes to various projects including establishing the Latina, Trino and Garigliano nuclear power plants. In December 1955, he was among the founders of the Italian Radical Party.

In August 1963 an Ippolito case about a supposed maladministration of the CNEN broke in the newspapers. Ippolito was arrested in 1964 and sentenced to 11 years in prison. The case was widely considered a scapegoat to block nuclear power in favour of the nascent Italian oil industry, and it has also been associated with the mysterious death of Enrico Mattei in 1962. Ippolito was pardoned by Giuseppe Saragat after two years in prison.

In 1968, Ippolito founded the magazine Le Scienze, the Italian version of Scientific American. Between 1979 and 1989, he was an Independent Left (Sinistra indipendente; SI) MEP, elected on the Italian Communist Party list.
