= Massimo Ferrero =

Italian film producer and businessman

Massimo Ferrero (born 1951) is an Italian film producer and businessman.

== Biography ==
=== Early life ===
He was born in Rome, in the working-class Testaccio neighborhood. His paternal grandmother was a soubrette at the Ambra Jovinelli and acted with Erminio Macario, his father Guglielmo and his brother were bus drivers, and his mother had a hawker stall in the market at Piazza Vittorio Emanuele II in Esquilino. Unaccustomed to study, as a young boy he often sneaked off to Cinecittà with Giuliano Gemma, who was an acrobat at the time. Here he made his first appearance in 1958. He then also played a small part in Liolà along with Giovanna Ralli (1963). As a young boy he worked at the General Markets unloading goods. Meanwhile, he spends six months in the Porta Portese juvenile prison, reporting that the real motivation was advances toward a guard's daughter. He then works as a courier for a butcher, as a gas station attendant (1967) and as a coffee peddler at the river port. He then plays small parts in Dino Risi's The Tiger and the Pussycat and Mr. Kinky (1968). Shortly afterwards he is taken by Gianni Morandi, whom he met during the filming of Faccia da schiaffi, as his driver, although he did not have a license. Meanwhile, he is taken to work on the construction site of one of his neighbors who is building apartments in Borgo Ottavia: after a short time he is sent away spending two days in Regina Coeli prison for having risked burning a colleague after throwing lime on him in reaction to a bullying.

At the age of eighteen he began his career in show business as Agostino Pane's production secretary and went through a long process, from factotum to production manager (from 1974 to 1983) in films such as The Immortal Bachelor and others. In 1983 he attained the title of general organizer first and executive producer later (from 1983 to 1998) in films such as Tinto Brass's Miranda and Ricky Tognazzi's Ultrà and others, in which he also played a small cameo. Another cameo in the 1995 film Camerieri, in which he impersonates Sem, the salesman of a greyhound.

Ferrero is nicknamed Er Viperetta; according to his account, this nickname has no negative connotation, having been given to him by Monica Vitti after defending the actress, despite his small stature, from an attacker. Ferrero himself, however, later denied this version, and in his autobiographical book he finally recounted that the first person to give him this nickname was a gay costume designer who, having turned out to be a masochist, enjoyed the beatings Ferrero gave him in reaction to his advances.

=== Marriage and early investments ===
He married Laura Sini, heiress of the dairy company I Buonatavola Sini located in Nepi, a town in the province of Viterbo, which produces and exports its products to the United States of America. With her he is co-owner of six dairies and from her marriage has a daughter, Emma. From a previous marriage he has two other daughters, Vanessa (head of the Ellemme Group, general organizer of films such as Il ritmo della vita and former member of the Board of Sampdoria) and Michela. He also adopted two sons. Recently from his relationship with Manuela Ramunni were born Rocco Contento in 2013 and Oscar in 2016.

Financed by Sini, in 1998 he launched his first independently produced film, Witnesses of Love, with Blu Cinematografica, but it did not repay the investment. With Libero Burro and La carbonara he lost a billion liras, with The Sweet Sounds of Life about 800 million, with Il tempo dell'amore a billion and 600 million, and finally three million euros with 2003's Io no, for which he was forced to sell a house. Among the company's collaborators are Ricky Tognazzi, Simona Izzo, Francesco Venditti and Claudia Gerini. Dino Giarrusso, now a member of the European Parliament, has often collaborated in his productions.

Payment injunctions, tax bills, garnishments and various lawsuits immediately descend on Farvem. The main asset is the residential complex on Via Rutilio in the Cinecittà area, valued at 40 million euros. Through the Ferrero Cinemas Group (which is part of the family-owned Mediaport Cinema group purchased by the state in 2008 for 26.5 million) it operates about 30 theaters in central Rome, including the historic Teatro Adriano. In 2006 it bought the rights to Jan Henrik Stahlberg's film Bye Bye Berlusconi!, which was shown at the 2006 Berlin Film Festival in the "Panorama Speciale" section, but the film would never be distributed both so as not to displease Silvio Berlusconi and because it may not have found someone to distribute it. Since 2009, it has also been a film distributor through Ellemme Group controlled by British companies Elmhold Limited and Artgold Limited, and for which RAI's board of directors is seeking clarification of its opaque structure.

In the same year through FG Holding it acquires charter airline Livingston Energy Flight, which works for tour operators such as I Viaggi del Ventaglio. In 2010 the Civil Aviation Authority suspends the airline's flight license and shortly afterwards the Court of Busto Arsizio declares the airline insolvent, activating the extraordinary administration procedure.

=== President of Sampdoria and activities in the years 2010–2020 ===
I have a blue-red heart and a yellow-red head.

— Massimo Ferrero in response to Valerio Staffelli's question about his preferences between Roma and Sampdoria

Ferrero has always declared himself a soccer fan, professing to be a fan of Roma in particular, which he says he tried to buy, as he also did with Salernitana.

On June 12, 2014, he took over ownership of Sampdoria for free from Edoardo Garrone, taking on about 15 million euros in debt. The acquisition is made through the financial company Sport Spettacolo Holding of Rome, which has a share capital of €950,000 and a net worth of €6.7 million (and also includes within it the film companies Eleven Finance, V Production and Do & Go), a wholly owned subsidiary of Holding Max S.r.l. (incorporated on June 27, 2014, with a share capital of €1,000, increased to €50,000 on May 6, 2015), held by his daughter Vanessa at 80 percent and his nephew Giorgio at 20 percent. The outgoing patron Garrone, who retains a 1 percent stake in the company for some time, is reported to have paid €36.5 million in capital, allocating a portion of it to writing off debt, which stood at €24.6 million as of Dec. 31, 2014. They are joined by another 28.9 million euros paid into Sport Spettacolo Holding's capital account, bringing Garrone's total outlay earmarked for Sampdoria's business continuity to a total of 65.4 million euros. With Garrone's exit, Sport Spettacolo Holding sums up 99.96 percent of U.C. Sampdoria's shares, leaving the remaining 0.04 percent to the network of small investors created under the chairmanship of Paolo Mantovani.

The first phase of Ferrero's management, thanks to the good results achieved by the Genoa team in the 2014–2015 season, earned the Roman entrepreneur a certain popularity at the national level, corroborated by the style of his public statements. Exemplary of the notoriety achieved are the choice of comedian Maurizio Crozza, a Doria fan, to start proposing his imitation within the show Crozza nel Paese delle Meraviglie, as well as his hosting during the third evening of the Sanremo Festival hosted by Carlo Conti, on February 12, 2015. He also participated in four evenings of the Grand Hotel Chiambretti between February and April.

In the following months Ferrero expresses interest in buying an additional soccer team, first Lecce, then Cosenza Calcio, but both intentions do not follow through. In the same period he gives to the presses the book Massimo Ferrero – Una vita al massimo (ed è il minimo che posso dirvi) [Massimo Ferrero – A Life at the Top (and that's the least I can tell you)], written four hands with Alessandro Alciato. Also attracting media attention is a satirical video from October 2015 by the comedy group Actual, featuring Ferrero ironically announcing his candidacy for mayor of Rome, and the small role of the mayor of Torresecca he played in Fausto Brizzi's Poveri ma ricchi.

Sampdoria's situation, however, soon begins to deteriorate: on the one hand, in February 2015, the Sampdoria Board of Directors approves a recovery plan valid until 2017–2018, which envisages breaking even in the 2015–2016 financial year and then starting to make a profit; on the other hand, in June of the same year, Ferrero turns out to have injected only 3 million into the company coffers from his own pocket and in the form of a loan.

On April 5, 2017, following the final sentence of one year and 10 months imposed on him for the Livingston collapse, the Italian Football Federation disqualified him from presiding over Sampdoria, of which he nevertheless remains the owner. As early as December 19 of the same year, however, he managed to return to the leadership of the club, subject to the invalidation of the disqualification; he was reappointed in office by the Board of Directors on December 28, 2018, when he declared the making of substantial investments in both players and real estate (notably to upgrade the academy in Bogliasco) and presented a surplus balance sheet of nearly 10 million euros.

The years following his presidency of Sampdoria, however, were marked by the club's worsening difficulties, with a souring of relations with a part of the fanbase, who begin to openly contest him, especially after the sale of the company to a U.S.-based group, represented by former Sampdoria player Gianluca Vialli, did not go through in 2019.

At the end of the 2020–2021 season, concluded by Sampdoria in ninth place, the decision of coach Claudio Ranieri to resign, complaining about the absence of prerequisites to continue the relationship, and the concomitant ambiguity regarding the renewal or not of the contract to several key figures in the organizational chart cooperate to fuel the disappointment of the Doria supporters, who openly call for his resignation. The rupture becomes final when the Sampdoria Federclubs issues a harsh statement against the president, addressing harsh criticism of his actions and attacking him on the front of his judicial situation.

On December 6, 2021, following his arrest on charges of corporate crimes and fraudulent bankruptcy, he resigned as president of the club, but without remitting its ownership, which, however, had been remitted to a trust a year earlier for the stated purpose of keeping it separate from the rest of the family business and to arrive at its sale.

On May 30, 2023, it is announced that the historic Genoan company will pass into the hands of Andrea Radrizzani and Matteo Manfredi, who through the subject Blucerchiati srl subscribe to a bond convertible into shares, under which the shares in Ferrero's hands immediately drop to 48.29 percent, and then reduce to 21 percent at the end of 2023.

As of 2025, he hosts the program Non solo Sport on Radio Cusano, a station owned by Stefano Bandecchi, the former Ternana owner and mayor of Terni whose Popular Alternative party was financed by Ferrero.

== Convictions ==
On June 12, 2014 (the same day Massimo Ferrero buys Sampdoria), under a plea bargaining rite, the preliminary hearing judge definitively sentenced Massimo Ferrero to one year and 10 months for the crime of fraudulent bankruptcy, in addition to the payment of part of the debts due to the bankruptcy of the airline Livingston Energy Flight.

In October that year, he let slip a racist remark against Inter Milan's Indonesian president Erick Thohir, calling on former president Massimo Moratti to kick out "that Filipino". Despite the official apology that came later, he was banned for three months by the National Federal Court on Dec. 15, but on Jan. 16, 2015, the Federal Court of Appeals upheld the appeal regarding the inhibition, removing it.

On March 6, 2015, the Municipality of Rome has the former Cinema Troisi in Trastevere vacated because, according to the Heritage Department, Ferrero is not the owner of the cinema, even though Ferrero himself claims to have purchased it from the Court after Vittorio Cecchi Gori's bankruptcy. At the same time Ferrero sues journalist Mario Giordano for quoting him in his book Pescecani, damaging his image by likening him for the Livingston affair to the great investigated or convicted figures of the Italian scene.

On May 27, 2015, a trial for false declaration for 1,176,000 euros kicks off: for PM Palazzi Ferrero in 2009 allegedly evaded IRES, the corporate income tax.

Meanwhile, ex-wife Laura Sini sues him for fraud and threats, and he responds with a lawsuit for slander.

On Sept. 29 of the same year, Rome Public Prosecutor's Office seizes his current accounts (for non-payment of taxes related to film companies) and an apartment in Parioli (illegality of building permit for carrying out work disputed by the other tenants) worth a total of 1.2 million euros. On October 26, the Re-examination Court confirmed the seizure.

On Feb. 4, 2016, the Court of Busto Arsizio sentences him to one year and 10 months for misappropriation of funds for the Livingston affair; the conviction came after a plea bargain and provides for him to be committed to community service in addition to €850,000 in compensation to the Ministry of Economic Development.

On Sept. 21 of the same year, he was investigated for violation of family support obligations.

=== Embezzlement, fraud, self-laundering and fraudulent misrepresentation ===
In July 2017, he was investigated by the Rome Public Prosecutor's Office for embezzlement and money laundering: he allegedly used Sampdoria's bank accounts for personal purposes and to replenish the coffers of entertainment companies traceable to him and Livingston.

On Nov. 28, 2018, the GIP at the request of the Public Prosecutor's Office issued a preventive asset seizure order against Ferrero and five other suspects for a total value of 2.6 million euros; 1.2 million euros allegedly disappeared from Samp's coffers, i.e., part of the money collected for the sale of Pedro Obiang in the summer of 2015. At the same time, the Federcalcio Prosecutor's Office opened a file on him. A month later, the Re-examination Court ordered the release of assets for Ferrero and four other suspects: his partner Manuela, daughter Vanessa, grandson Giorgio and Andrea Diamanti (a member of Sampdoria's board of directors).

On July 3, 2020, the Rome Public Prosecutor's Office, in the person of Public Prosecutor Maria Sabina Calabretta, seeks indictment for Massimo Ferrero, who is accused of having embezzled 1.159 million euros from the team's coffers by diverting to the accounts of one of his companies, Vici Srl, part of the sum received from the sale of soccer player Pedro Obiang. The charges are embezzlement, fraud, self-laundering and fraudulent declaration. In October 2020 Massimo Ferrero, was acquitted of the charges by the GIP of Rome as part of the proceedings in which he was charged with embezzlement, self-laundering and use of false invoices. This was decided by Judge Alessandro Arturi who, not accepting the requests of the Public Prosecutor's Office, also acquitted the other defendants who had opted for the abbreviated procedure (Ferrero's daughter Vanessa, manager Andrea Diamanti, Ferrero's nephew Giorgio and manager Marco Valerio Guercini). The defendants were fully acquitted "because the fact does not exist."

=== Bankruptcy and corporate crimes ===
On December 6, 2021, Ferrero was arrested by the Guardia di Finanza as part of an investigation by the Paola Public Prosecutor's Office for corporate crimes and aggravated fraudulent bankruptcy. Ferrero was transferred to San Vittore prison, while five others were placed under house arrest, including his daughter and a nephew. As part of the investigation against him, searches were conducted in several regions, including Lombardy, Lazio, Campania, Basilicata, and Calabria. The investigation is not related to football issues related to Sampdoria, but rather to the bankruptcies of some of Ferrero's Calabrian companies operating in the hotel, tourism, and film sectors, as well as to the dubious traceability of a fund ("Pkb fund") belonging to Ferrero's galaxy of companies, whose administrators were, however, still unknown.

The pre-trial detention order issued by the Judge of the Court of Paola is based, in particular, on a series of telephone interceptions and the circumstance of a fake theft – reported by Ferrero – of an Audi S8 inside which, according to what Ferrero allegedly made believe, "was kept a leather bag containing all the accounting documentation" of the four bankrupt companies. This was done in order to prevent accounting controls on those companies. The indictment also charges Ferrero with entering into a leasing contract for a Ferrari model F430 Spider, which took place through the diversion of some 200,000 euros from the corporate assets of one of his four companies (which would shortly thereafter actually go bankrupt). The overall picture, according to Guardia di Finanza investigators, would demonstrate Ferrero's situation of deep indebtedness: "the financial stratagems implemented by Massimo Ferrero had as their sole objective that of personal enrichment through the creation of companies, then put into liquidation, in order not to return the money to creditors".

The prison measure became necessary, according to the judge, in the face of "a concrete and very serious danger of commission of crimes similar to those for which we are proceeding (...) in fact, there appears to be a high danger that, where free to circulate in the territory, the suspects may operate illicitly in both direct and mediated manner, including through contacts and mutual communications and/or with third parties (. ...) so much is evident from the plurality and the same ways of committing the crimes connoted by the inclusion of an enlarged subjective and objective context, characterized, by a considerable predisposition of means by a considerable commitment in terms of managerial activity and an enormous number of administrative and accounting operations."

On Dec. 9, Ferrero – by videoconference from the San Vittore Prison – availed himself, as anticipated, of the right not to answer before the Paola judge. In the meantime, Ferrero's lawyers filed an appeal with the Catanzaro Re-examination Court, as previously announced, to request the release of their client. On Dec. 23, the Riesame allowed Ferrero's appeal, replacing the pre-trial detention measure with house arrest. On April 1, 2022, the Paola Public Prosecutor's Office concluded its investigation against Ferrero and served him with the relevant notice of conclusion of investigation, not deeming it necessary to dismiss the proceedings against him. On May 23, at the end of the preliminary hearing, the judge at the Paola Court ordered Ferrero's indictment, simultaneously revoking the house arrest against him. The trial by ordinary procedure kicked off on Sept. 21, and the first hearing was held on Nov. 23. The following Dec. 6, interdiction measures including a ban on holding social positions expire.

=== Trading and scamming ===
In July 2023, Ferrero, lawyer Antonio Romei and Sampdoria's chief operating officer Alberto Bosco were investigated by the Genoa Public Prosecutor's Office for false corporate communications, issuing invoices for non-existent transactions and fraudulent declaration through the use of invoices for non-existent transactions regarding the purchases and sales of some players related to the relationship between Juventus and Sampdoria: the biggest capital gain concerns Emil Audero. Ferrero is also charged with the crime of fraud for obtaining public disbursements in the years 2019 and 2020 during the COVID-19 pandemic amounting to 62 million euros: for the magistrates, he would have allocated part of those loans assisted by a public guarantee "for purposes other than those in relation to which the guarantee was granted."

=== Breach of seals ===
In October 2023 he was joined by a complaint from the Court of Rome for tampering in 2019 with the seals of a property that had been seized from him in Parioli with the aim of preventing access to the judicial receiver. For the same property, moreover, Ferrero had already been charged with building abuse for trying to install a hot tub in the penthouse, redo the floors and demolish partitions, despite a renovation ban imposed by the director of the Technical Organizational Unit of the II Municipality in 2011.

== Filmography ==
=== Production director ===
- The Immortal Bachelor, by Marcello Fondato (1974)
- Cat's Eye, by Alberto Bevilacqua (1975)
- Duck in Orange Sauce, by Luciano Salce (1976)
- Stay as You Are, by Alberto Lattuada (1977)
- Father of the Godfathers, by Pasquale Squitieri (1978)
- L'ultimo nome, by Damiano Damiani (1979)
- Velvet Hands, by Castellano & Pipolo (1979)
- Marco Polo, by Giuliano Montaldo (1982)
- Tragedy of a Ridiculous Man, by Bernardo Bertolucci (1981)
- The Key, by Tinto Brass (1983)
- Bertoldo, Bertoldino e Cacasenno, by Mario Monicelli (1983)
- Forever Mary, by Marco Risi (1988)
- Ultra, by Ricky Tognazzi (1991)
- Parenti serpenti, by Mario Monicelli (1992)

=== Executive producer ===
- Il diavolo sulle colline, by Vittorio Cottafavi (1984)
- The Future Is Woman, by Marco Ferreri (1984)
- Miranda, by Tinto Brass (1985)
- La Storia, by Luigi Comencini (1985)
- Capriccio, by Tinto Brass (1986)
- The Barbarians, by Ruggero Deodato (1987)
- Arrivederci e grazie, by Giorgio Capitani (1987)
- Snack Bar Budapest, by Tinto Brass (1988)
- Francesco, by Liliana Cavani (1988)
- Boys on the Outside, by Marco Risi (1990)
- Ultra, by Ricky Tognazzi (1991)
- Felipe ha gli occhi azzurri, by Gianfranco Albano and Felice Farina (1991)
- Ostinato destino, by Gianfranco Albano (1992)
- Mille bolle blu, by Leone Pompucci (1993)
- Fermo posta Tinto Brass, by Tinto Brass (1995)
- Cuba Libre – Velocipedi ai tropici, by David Riondino (1996)
- Penniless Hearts, by Giuseppe Piccioni (1996)
- Bambola, by Juan José Bigas Luna (1996)
- We'll Really Hurt You, by Pino Quartullo (1998)

=== Producer ===
- Testimoni d'amore, by Giacomo Campiotti (1998)
- La vespa e la regina, by Antonello De Leo (1999)
- Libero Burro, by Sergio Castellitto (1999)
- La carbonara, by Luigi Magni (1999)
- The Sweet Sounds of Life, by Giuseppe Bertolucci (1999)
- Il tempo dell'amore, by Giacomo Campiotti (1999)
- Tra(sgre)dire, by Tinto Brass (2000)
- Commedia sexy, by Claudio Bigagli (2001)
- The Good Pope: Pope John XXIII, by Ricky Tognazzi (2003)
- Io no, by Ricky Tognazzi and Simona Izzo (2003)
- Intrigo a Cuba, by Riccardo Leoni (2004)
- Concorso di colpa, by Claudio Fragasso (2005)
- Ma l'amore... sì!, by Tonino Zangardi and Marco Costa (2006)
- Tutte le donne della mia vita, by Simona Izzo (2007)
- Così vanno le cose, by Francesco Bovino (2008)
- Sleepless, by Maddalena De Panfilis (2009)
- Shadow, by Federico Zampaglione (2009)
- Il ritmo della vita, by Rossella Izzo (2010)
- Il generale dei briganti, by Paolo Poeti (2011)
- Delitto d'amore, by Rossella Izzo (2014)
- Le frise ignoranti, by Antonello De Leo and Pietro Loprieno (2015)

=== Actor ===
- My Son, the Hero, by Duccio Tessari (1962)
- Strange Occasion, by Nanni Loy, Luigi Magni, Luigi Comencini (1976)
- Ultra, by Ricky Tognazzi (1991)
- Camerieri, by Leone Pompucci (1995)
- Fermo posta Tinto Brass, by Tinto Brass (1995)
- Do You Mind If I Kiss Mommy?, by Alessandro Benvenuti (2003)
- Tutte le donne della mia vita, by Simona Izzo (2007)
- Così vanno le cose, by Francesco Bovino (2008)
- Poveri ma ricchi, by Fausto Brizzi (2016)
- Vita da Carlo, by Carlo Verdone and Arnaldo Catinari (2021)

== See also ==
- UC Sampdoria
- Livingston Energy Flight

== Bibliography ==
- Ferrero, Massimo; Alciato, Alessandro (2015). Massimo Ferrero – Una vita al massimo (ed è il minimo che posso dirvi) [Massimo Ferrero - A life to the fullest (and that's the least I can tell you)] (in Italian). Rizzoli. ISBN 978-88-17-08233-4.
