= Vittorio Amandola =

Italian actor (1952–2010)

- Born: 4 November 1952; Perugia, Italy
- Died: 22 July 2010 (aged 57); Rome, Italy
- Occupations: Actor; voice actor; dialogue adapter; theatre director
- Years active: 1974–2010
- Spouse: Sonia Scotti
- Children: 1

Vittorio Amandola (4 November 1952 – 22 July 2010) was an Italian actor and voice actor.

== Career ==
Born in Perugia, Amandola began his career in the theatre world in the 1970s and found great success starring in various plays and later went on to direct his own theatre productions. He also starred in several Italian films and television shows. In 2006, he made notable cameos in RIS Delitti Imperfetti and Don Matteo.

Amandola was also known as a voice actor. He voiced Waylon Smithers in the Italian-Language version of The Simpsons until his death in 2010 and he even dubbed many Disney characters into the Italian language, particularly during the Disney Renaissance period. One of these roles included Lumière from Beauty and the Beast. From 1989 to 2000, he was the Italian voice of Goofy as well as Yosemite Sam in Looney Tunes from 1996 to 2006.

=== Personal life ===
Amandola was married to voice actress Sonia Scotti and was also the stepfather to her two children. Additionally, he had one son, Matteo.

== Death ==
Amandola died of cancer in Rome on 22 July 2010, aged 57. The Italian voices of Smithers and Yosemite Sam were passed on to Pasquale Anselmo and Pierluigi Astore respectively.

== Filmography ==
=== Cinema ===
Year	Title	Role(s)	Notes
1979	Belli e brutti ridono tutti		
1986	Ginger and Fred		
1987	Farewell Moscow		
1988	Il volpone	Serse Tessari	
1988	Appointment in Liverpool	Italian Commissioner	
1989	Queen of Hearts	Barbariccia	
1989	Time to Kill		
1990	Panama Sugar	Fox Perry	
1992	Who Wants to Kill Sara?	Lawyer	
1994	Il branco	Raniero’s father	
1994	The Monster	Antiquarian	
1996	Acquario		
1996	Strangled Lives	Antiquario	
1997	Farfalle		
1998	Dio c'è		
1999	Il prezzo	Alvaro	
1999	Il guerriero Camillo		
2000	Incontri di primavera	Italo	
2001	The Last Kiss	Mimmo	
2001	Witches to the North	Baffone	
2002	Ciao America	Professor Angelini	
2002	Gioco con la morte	Alvise	
2002	La rivincita	Marco	
2004	Tartarughe sul dorso	Baker	
2006	Baciami piccina	Attanasio	
2006	Napoleon and Me	Sindaco Egisto Lonzi Tognarini	

=== Television ===
Year	Title	Role(s)	Notes
1982	La veritaaaà	l'infermiere	TV film
1986	Mino	Rignani	TV miniseries
1989	La piovra 4	Uomo fabbrica abbandonata	TV series
1990	A Season of Giants	1st Cardinal	TV film
1991	Jute City	Finetti	TV film
1992	Scoop		TV miniseries
1993	Requiem per voce e pianoforte		TV film
1993	Agatha Christie's Poirot	1st Secretary	1 episode
1995	La voce del cuore	Macellaio	TV miniseries
1996	Il caso Redoli		TV film
1997	Un giorno fortunato	Saverio	TV miniseries
1997	Caro maestro	Saverio Serranti	TV series
1999	Il compagno		TV film
1999	Ama il tuo nemico	Turiello	TV film
1999	Baldini e Simoni		2 episodes
2000	Mary Magdalene	Simone il fariseo	TV film
2001	Distretto di Polizia	Mario Ferri	1 episode
2005	Meucci - L'italiano che inventò il telefono	Capo macchinista	TV miniseries
2005	Rome	Procolo	1 episode
2005	Una famiglia in giallo		1 episode
2006	Distretto di Polizia	Inspector Pinto	2 episodes
2006	RIS Delitti Imperfetti	Placido’s brother	1 episode
2006	Don Matteo	Pietro Garbi	1 episode
2006	Bartali: The Iron Man	Father Berti	TV film
2007	Le ragazze di San Frediano	Sandro	TV miniseries
2008	Il maresciallo Rocca e l'amico d'infanzia	Passina	TV miniseries
2008	Ho sposato uno sbirro	Coroner	8 episodes
2009	Pane e libertà	Giuseppe di Vagno	TV miniseries
2010	I delitti del cuoco		1 episode
2011	Rex	Germano Luccheri	1 episode; Posthumous release

== Voice work ==
Year	Title	Role	Notes
1996	How the Toys Saved Christmas	Skipper the Boat Captain	Animated film
2007	Welcome Back Pinocchio (Bentornato Pinocchio)	The Coachman	Animated film
2008	Mostri & pirati	Prof. Pedrito Espadon	Animated series

=== Dubbing ===
==== Films (Animation, Italian dub) ====
Year	Title	Role(s)	Ref
1981	The Looney Looney Looney Bugs Bunny Movie	King Arthur	
1981	The Looney Looney Looney Bugs Bunny Movie	TV presenter	
1981	The Looney Looney Looney Bugs Bunny Movie	Yosemite Sam (1999 redub)	
1988	Oliver & Company	Old Louie	
1988	My Neighbor Totoro	Totoro	
1989	Little Nemo: Adventures in Slumberland	Oompo	
1989	The Little Mermaid	Chef Louis	
1990	Donald in Mathmagic Land (1990 redub)	Chess King	
1990	Donald in Mathmagic Land (1990 redub)	Pi creature	
1991	Beauty and the Beast	Lumière	
1992	Hanappe Bazooka	Ophisto Bazooka	
1992	FernGully: The Last Rainforest	Goanna	
1995	A Goofy Movie	Goofy	
1996	Beauty and the Beast: The Enchanted Christmas	Lumière	
1997	Space Jam	Yosemite Sam	
1998	Belle's Magical World	Lumière	
1998	A Bug's Life	Molt	
1999	The Iron Giant	General Rogard	
1999	Toy Story 2	Stinky Pete the Prospector	
2000	The Little Mermaid II: Return to the Sea	Chef Louis	
2000	The Magic Pudding	Buncle	
2002	Inspector Gadget's Last Case: Claw's Revenge	Velvetmobile	
2003	Looney Tunes: Back in Action	Yosemite Sam	
2004	Van Helsing: The London Assignment	Dr. Henry Jekyll	
2006	Bah, Humduck! A Looney Tunes Christmas	Yosemite Sam	
2006	Barbie in the 12 Dancing Princesses	Desmond	
2007	The Simpsons Movie	Waylon Smithers	

==== Films (Live action, Italian dub) ====
Year	Title	Role(s)	Original actor	Ref
1984	The Toxic Avenger	Mayor Peter Belgoody Goldberg	R. L. Ryan	
1985	Mezzo destro mezzo sinistro - 2 calciatori senza pallone	Bellei	Filiberto D'Angelo	
1985	Pee-wee's Big Adventure	Mario	Monte Landis	
1987	Predator	Billy Sole	Sonny Landham	
1988	Die Hard	Agent Johnson	Grand L. Bush	
1990	Cry-Baby	Hateful Guard	Willem Dafoe	
1990	Ghost	Workman in Loft	Thom Curley	
1990	Predator 2	Gold Tooth	Michael Mark Edmondson	
1991	Nothing but Trouble	Lil' Debbull	John Daveikis	
1992	Alien 3	Thomas Murphy	Christopher Fairbank	
1992	Split Second	Rat Catcher	Michael J. Pollard	
1995	Billy Madison	Bus Driver	Chris Farley	
1995	Batman Forever	Hawkins	Joe Grifasi	
1997	Mouse Hunt	Alexander Falko	Maury Chaykin	
1999	Life	"Pokerface"	Barry Shabaka Henley	
1999	Deuce Bigalow: Male Gigolo	Bob Bigalow	Richard Riehle	
2001	The Lord of the Rings: The Fellowship of the Ring	Farmer Maggot	Cameron Rhodes	
2001	The Majestic	Doc Stanton	David Ogden Stiers	
2003	Dickie Roberts: Former Child Star	Rob Reiner	Rob Reiner	
2004	Van Helsing	Dr. Henry Jekyll	Stephen Fisher	
2004	Millions	Saint Peter	Alun Armstrong	
2006	Treasure Island Kids: The Battle for Treasure Island	Captain Flint	Randy Quaid	
2007	Hannibal Rising	Paul Momund	Charles Maquignon	
2007	Postal	Candidate Eugene Welles	J. K. Simmons	

==== Television (Animation, Italian dub) ====
Year	Title	Role(s)	Notes	Ref
1980s, 1996–2006	Looney Tunes	Marvin the Martian (1980s redubs); Yosemite Sam (1990s-2000s redubs)	Main cast	
1980s, 1996–2006	Merrie Melodies	Marvin the Martian (1980s redubs); Yosemite Sam (1990s-2000s redubs)	Main cast	
1989–1990	Chip 'n Dale: Rescue Rangers	Professor Norton Nimnul	Recurring role	
1991–2010	The Simpsons	Waylon Smithers	Seasons 1–9, 14–20	
1993	Dinosaurs	Roy Danger Hess	Recurring role	
1993	Darkwing Duck	Negaduck, Tuskernini	Recurring role	
1993–1995	Goof Troop	Goofy	Main cast	
2000–2004	Courage the Cowardly Dog	Dr. Vindaloo	Recurring role	
2001	Futurama	Harold Zoid	1 episode	
2001–2010	Family Guy	Horace	Recurring role; Seasons 2–7	
2002	All Dogs Go to Heaven: The Series	Killer	Main cast	
2002–2008	Codename: Kids Next Door	Captain Stickybeard	9 episodes	
2003–2006	Fimbles	Roly Mo	Main cast	
2004–2005	Flipper & Lopaka	Ottie	Main cast	
2006	Power Rangers Mystic Force	Phineas	Recurring role	

==== Television (Live action, Italian dub) ====
Year	Title	Role(s)	Notes	Original actor	Ref
1976	The High Chaparral	Joe Butler	Recurring role; Seasons 2–4	Bob Hoy	
2000–2001	Oz	Vic D'Agnasti	Recurring role	Douglas Crosby	
2007	Power Rangers Operation Overdrive	Norg	Recurring role	Kelson Henderson	

==== Video games (Italian dub) ====
Year	Title	Role(s)	Ref
1999	Bugs Bunny: Lost in Time	Yosemite Sam	
2000	Bugs Bunny & Taz: Time Busters	Yosemite Sam	
2000	Wacky Races	Dick Dastardly	
2002	Taz: Wanted	Yosemite Sam	
2007	The Simpsons Game	Waylon Smithers	
