= Paolo Buglioni =

Italian actor and voice actor

- Born: 2 November 1950 (age 75); Rome, Italy
- Occupations: Actor; voice actor; dubbing director
- Years active: 1980–present

Paolo Buglioni (born 2 November 1950) is an Italian actor and voice actor.

== Biography ==
Born in Rome, Buglioni started his acting career on stage and he eventually found a place in cinema, television, and the dubbing field. He regularly provides the Italian dubbed voice of Nick Nolte, Alec Baldwin, Samuel L. Jackson and he also dubs John Candy and Brendan Gleeson in some of their movies. Buglioni is well renowned for providing the Italian voice of Eeyore in the Winnie the Pooh franchise as well as his performance as Basil in the Italian dub of The Great Mouse Detective.

Buglioni is also the Italian voice of Gargamel in The Smurfs.

== Filmography ==
=== Cinema ===
- Excellent Cadavers (1999)
- Loro (2018)

=== Television ===
- Edera (1992)
- A Place in the Sun (2003)
- Una donna per amico
- Distretto di Polizia
- La squadra
- Don Matteo
- Lo zio d'America (2002)
- Carabinieri
- Tutti i sogni del mondo (2003)
- RIS Delitti Imperfetti
- Provaci ancora prof
- Cotti e mangiati
- Ho sposato uno sbirro
- Romanzo criminale – La serie
- Fratelli detective (2009) – TV Film
- Il delitto di via Poma (2011) – TV Film
- Rocco Schiavone

== Dubbing roles ==
=== Animation ===
- Basil in The Great Mouse Detective
- Eeyore in The Many Adventures of Winnie the Pooh, Pooh's Grand Adventure: The Search for Christopher Robin, The Tigger Movie, Piglet's Big Movie, Pooh's Heffalump Movie, Winnie the Pooh, The New Adventures of Winnie the Pooh, The Book of Pooh, My Friends Tigger & Pooh
- Gargamel in The Smurfs
- Jack in Oggy and the Cockroaches
- The Brain in Pinky and the Brain (episodes 41–65), Pinky, Elmyra & the Brain
- King Arthur, Captain Achab, Myles Standish and Daniel Boone in Animaniacs
- Jerry Slugworth in Monsters, Inc.
- Cobra Bubbles in Lilo & Stitch, Stitch! The Movie
- Franklin Bean in Fantastic Mr. Fox
- Bender Bending Rodríguez in Futurama (season 7x14-7x26), The Simpsons
- Cloak in The Wild
- Papa Bear in Looney Tunes: Back in Action
- Oscar in Ice Age
- Shaw in Open Season, Open Season: Scared Silly
- Flintheart Glomgold in DuckTales (Ep. 98–100) and The New Adventures Of DuckTales (Ep. 69)
- Nick Fury in Iron Man: Rise of Technovore
- Joe in Help! I'm a Fish
- Nicky Flippers in Hoodwinked!
- Producer in 101 Dalmatians II: Patch's London Adventure
- Murphy in Spirit: Stallion of the Cimarron
- Zaragoza in The Road to El Dorado
- Tennessee O'Neal in The Country Bears
- Mayor Phlegmming in Osmosis Jones
- Corporal in Penguins of Madagascar
- Silversmith in Barbie as Rapunzel
- Alec Baldwin in Team America: World Police
- Rhinokey in The Wuzzles
- Abraham Lincoln in Animaniacs

=== Live action ===
- Mace Windu in Star Wars: Episode I – The Phantom Menace, Star Wars: Episode II – Attack of the Clones, Star Wars: Episode III – Revenge of the Sith
- Nick Fury in Iron Man, Iron Man 2, Thor, Captain America: The First Avenger, The Avengers, Captain America: The Winter Soldier, Avengers: Age of Ultron, Avengers: Infinity War, Captain Marvel, Spider-Man: Far From Home
- Alastor Moody in Harry Potter and the Goblet of Fire, in Harry Potter and the Order of the Phoenix, Harry Potter and the Deathly Hallows – Part 1
- Gargamel in The Smurfs, The Smurfs 2
- Alan Hunley in Mission: Impossible – Rogue Nation, Mission: Impossible – Fallout
- Mick Dugan in Working Girl
- Dr. Jed Hill in Malice
- Lamont Cranston in The Shadow
- Nicholas Kudrow in Mercury Rising
- Stan Indursky in Along Came Polly
- Juan Trippe in The Aviator
- Phil DeVoss in Elizabethtown
- Sam Murach in The Good Shepherd
- John Foy in To Rome with Love
- Hal Francis in Blue Jasmine
- John Howland in Still Alice
- General Dixon in Aloha
- Robert Maheu in Rules Don't Apply
- Dr. Kennebrew Beauregard in BlacKkKlansman
- Learoyd in Farewell to the King
- Lionel Dobie in New York Stories
- Jack Cates in Another 48 Hrs.
- Pete Bell in Blue Chips
- Peter Brackett in I Love Trouble
- Wade Whitehouse in Affliction
- Gordon Tall in The Thin Red Line
- Adam Verver in The Golden Bowl
- David Banner in Hulk
- Socrates in Peaceful Warrior
- Donal Fitzgerald in The Company You Keep
- Samyaza in Noah
- Stephen Katz in A Walk in the Woods
- Frank Stockburn in The Ridiculous 6
- Andrew Stirling in Amos & Andrew
- Dale Deveaux in The New Age
- Colonel Ron in The Search for One-eye Jimmy
- Jimmy in Hard Eight
- Roger Tyrton in Braindead
- John Shaft II in Shaft
- Tom McCourt in Cell
- Gus Polinski in Home Alone
- Gerry Boyle in The Guard
- Joseph Lynch in Assassin's Creed
- Spike Nolan in Brewster's Millions
- Coleman in Trading Places
- Ron Witwicky in Transformers
- John Landon in Rise of the Planet of the Apes
- Clay Morrow in Sons of Anarchy
- Ed Green in Law & Order
- Eugene Young in The Practice
- Frederick Sinclair in Fallout
