= Ricky Memphis =

Italian actor

- Born: Riccardo Fortunati; 29 August 1968 (age 58); Rome, Italy
- Occupation: Actor
- Known for: His role as Inspector Mauro Belli in the police drama series Distretto di Polizia broadcast by Canale 5

Ricky Memphis (stage name of Riccardo Fortunati; born 29 August 1968) is an Italian television and film actor. He is best known for his interpretation of Inspector Mauro Belli, in the police drama series, Distretto di Polizia ("Police District"), which was broadcast weekly for eleven seasons by Italian network Canale 5 from 2000 to 2012.

== Career ==
Ricky Memphis was born in Rome, Italy. His career in the entertainment business began at the end of the 1980s with his first television appearance as an urban poet on the Maurizio Costanzo talk show. He chose his stage name "Memphis" in honour of American singer Elvis Presley.

His first role in a major picture was in the 1990 film Ultra, directed by Ricky Tognazzi. Memphis won the award for Best Supporting Actor for his portrayal of Red at the European Film Awards.

He followed with roles in Pugni di rabbia, La scorta and Il branco. Memphis received national popularity with his interpretation of the compassionate Inspector Mauro Belli in Mediaset's Canale 5 television police drama series Distretto di Polizia ("Police District"), which aired for eight seasons from 26 September 2000 to November 2009. His character left the series in the sixth season of the series. There was talk of Memphis returning to the series in his former role of Inspector Mauro Belli. Memphis's television work also includes the Canale 5/Italia 1 production of Crimini bianchi ("White Crimes"), in which he played the role of lawyer Claudio Bruni, and Rai 1's Caccia al re - La Narcotici in 2011.

== Filmography ==
=== Film ===
Year	Title	Role(s)	Notes
1991	Ultra	Red	
1991	Pugni di rabbia	Danilo Ferranti	
1993	Briganti – Amore e libertà	Frappeste	
1993	The Escort	Fabio Muzzi	
1994	The Heroes	Enzo	
1994	Il branco	Pallesecche	
1995	L'anno prossimo vado a letto alle dieci	Poldo	
1995	Palermo – Milan One Way	Remo Matteotti	
1996	Strangled Lives	Claudio De Santis	
1997	Other Men	Riccardo Zanni	
1998	We'll Really Hurt You	Ruggero	
1998	Kaputt Mundi	Orecchino	
1999	S.O.S.	Policeman	Cameo appearance
2002	Paz!	Man from Latina	Cameo appearance
2007	Milan – Palermo The Return	Remo Matteotti	
2011	The Immature	Lorenzo Coppetti	
2011	Ex 2: Still Friends?	Fabio De Rossi	
2011	Vacanze di Natale a Cortina	Massimo Proietti	
2012	The Immature: The Trip	Lorenzo Coppetti	
2013	Us in the U.S.	Nino	
2013	The Fifth Wheel	Giacinto	
2014	The Move of the Penguin	Salvatore	
2014	A Fairy-Tale Wedding	Daniele Baldini	
2014	Soap Opera	Paolo Bonetti	
2014	What's Your Sign?	Saturno Bolla	
2015	Torno indietro e cambio vita	Claudio Palmerini	
2016	Miami Beach	Lorenzo	
2018	Sconnessi	Achille Catenacci	
2018	Loro	Riccardo Pasta	
2018	A Five Stars Christmas	Walter Bianchini	
2019	Don't Stop Me Now	Dario Carocchi	
2019	Il grande salto	Nello	
2020	Un figlio di nome Erasmus	Pietro	
2020	Divorzio a Las Vegas	Lucio	
2020	Lockdown all'italiana	Walter	
2023	A Freaking Wedding!	Remo	
2023	The Worst Days	Vincenzo	
2025	Poveri noi	Ottavio Crocetti	
2026	Prendiamoci una pausa	Romeo	

=== Television ===
Year	Title	Role(s)	Notes
1999	Excellent Cadavers	Mafioso #1	Television movie
2000–2006	Distretto di Polizia	Inspector Mauro Belli	Main role (season 1-6); 136 episodes
2001	Il morso del serpente	Sante Venuti	Television movie
2001	La Sindone – 24 ore, 14 ostaggi	Alberto	Television movie
2008–2009	Crimini bianchi	Claudio Bruni	Lead role; 12 episodes
2010	Un paradiso per due	Nerone	Television movie
2011	Anti-Drug Squad	Livio Vitale	Main role (season 1); 6 episodes
2011	Così fan tutte	Various	Season 2, episode 1
2011–2012	Tutti pazzi per amore	Giampaolo	Main role (season 3); 26 episodes
2011–2013	Come un delfino	Father Luca Palmisano	Main role; 6 episodes
2012	Area Paradiso	Aurelio	Television movie
2018	The Immature: The Series	Lorenzo Coppetti	Main role; 8 episodes
2019	L'amore, il sole e le altre stelle	Pietro	Television movie
2021–2024	Everything Calls for Salvation	Pino Cogli	Main role; 10 episodes
2024	Mameli	Angelo Brunetti / Ciceruacchio	Main role; 4 episodes
2026	I Cesaroni	Carlo Antonelli	Main role (season 7); 12 episodes
