= Francesco Venditti =

Italian actor and voice actor (born 1976)

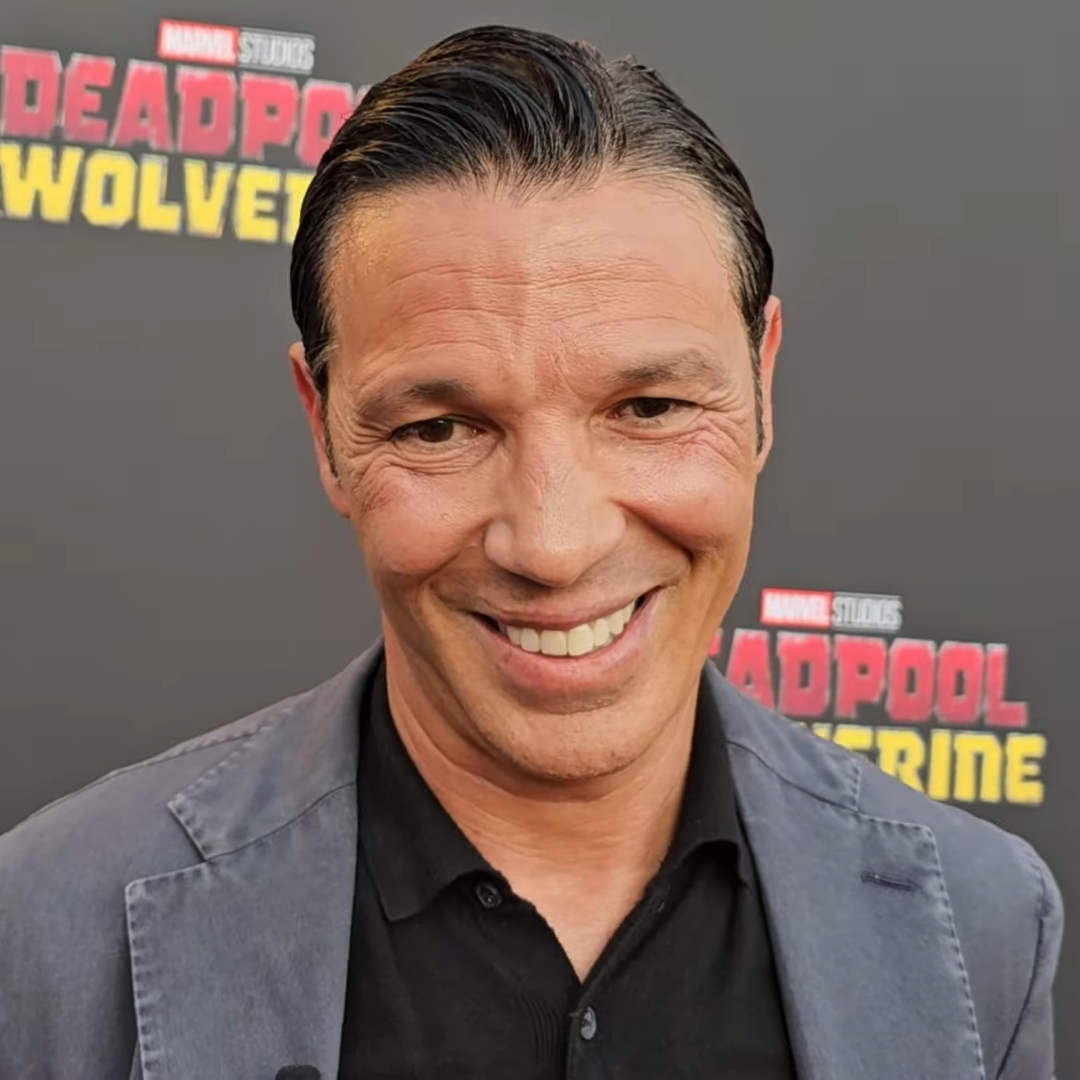
- Venditti in 2024
- Born: Francesco Saverio Venditti; 27 August 1976 (age 49); Rome, Italy
- Occupations: Actor; voice actor
- Years active: 1985–present
- Height: 1.80 m (5 ft 11 in)
- Spouse: Alexandra La Capria (divorced)
- Children: 4
- Parents: Antonello Venditti (father); Simona Izzo (mother)
- Relatives: Ricky Tognazzi (stepfather); Renato Izzo (grandfather); Rossella Izzo (aunt); Fiamma Izzo (aunt); Giuppy Izzo (aunt); Myriam Catania (cousin)

Francesco Saverio Venditti (born 27 August 1976) is an Italian actor and voice actor.

== Biography ==
Born in Rome to singer-songwriter Antonello Venditti and actress Simona Izzo, Venditti made his acting debut on television as a child in 1985 and made his first film appearance in the 1995 film Strangled Lives directed by his stepfather Ricky Tognazzi. He then appeared in a 1995 TV film directed by Paolo Poeti.

Venditti generally made appearances in fiction stories on television, such as Caro maestro as well as Una donna per amico and Lo zio d'America. He also starred as the young Nicola Catania in the television movie The Good Pope: Pope John XXIII.

As a voice actor, Venditti performed the Italian voice of Ryan Reynolds and Nicholas Hoult as Deadpool and Beast respectively in the X-Men film franchise. Other actors he occasionally dubs includes Michael Peña, Giovanni Ribisi, Justin Long, Diego Luna and David Dastmalchian. In his animated roles, he voiced Oliver in the Italian-Language dub of Oliver & Company.

=== Personal life ===
From Venditti's marriage to screenwriter Alexandra La Capria, he had two children, Alice and Tomaso. He also has another two children, Leonardo and Mia, from his current partner Cristina Congiunti. He considers himself Roman Catholic.

== Filmography ==
=== Cinema ===
- Strangled Lives (1995)
- Bedrooms (1997)
- Cuori perduti (1997)
- The Sky in a Room (1999)
- Almost Blue (2000)
- Sottovento! (2001)
- Commedia sexy (2001)
- Tornare indietro (2001)
- Quartetto (2001)
- I giorni dell'amore e dell'odio (2001)
- Fate come noi (2001)
- Io no (2003)
- Romanzo Criminale (2005)
- Gas (2005)
- Il punto rosso (2006)
- Il monastero (2008)
- Polvere (2009)
- Sleepless (2009)
- Ganja Fiction (2009)
- The Last 56 Hours (2009)
- Cinque (2009)
- The Museum of Wonders (2010)
- Alien Exorcism (2011)

=== Television ===
- Un ponte per Terabithia (1985)
- Compagni di branco (1996)
- Caro maestro (1997)
- Amico mio (1998)
- Una donna per amico (1998–1999)
- Valeria medico legale (2000)
- Giornalisti (2000)
- Lo zio d'America (2002)
- Inferno Below (2003) – TV Film
- The Good Pope: Pope John XXIII (2003) – TV Film
- Nero (2004) – TV Film
- Il Grande Torino (2005)
- La freccia nera (2006)
- Questa è la mia terra (2006)
- Eravamo solo mille (2006)
- Amore proibito (2007)
- Dottor Clown (2008)
- Mia madre (2010
- Roma nuda (2010)
- Vi perdono ma inginocchiatevi (2012)
- Il caso Enzo Tortora – Dove eravamo rimasti? (2012)
- L'ultimo papa re (2013)

== Dubbing roles ==
=== Animation ===
- Oliver in Oliver & Company
- Frankie the Frog in Meet the Robinsons
- Tito Lopez in Turbo
- Jet-Vac in Skylanders Academy
- Marm in The Nut Job
- Falcon in Avengers Assemble
- Linus in Pride
- Shawn in Total Drama All-Stars and Pahkitew Island
- Kevin Murphy in F Is for Family
- Swift Wind in She-Ra and the Princesses of Power
- Hawkeye in The Avengers: Earth's Mightiest Heroes
- Egg Boiz in Hazbin Hotel
- Vortex in Helluva Boss

=== Live action ===
- Wade Wilson / Deadpool in X-Men Origins: Wolverine
- Wade Wilson / Deadpool in Deadpool
- Wade Wilson / Deadpool in Deadpool 2
- Wade Wilson / Deadpool in Deadpool & Wolverine
- Hank McCoy / Beast in X-Men: Days of Future Past
- Hank McCoy / Beast in X-Men: Apocalypse
- Rory Adams in Life
- Will Jimeno in World Trade Center
- Cassian Andor in Rogue One
- Parker Selfridge in Avatar
- Kurt in Ant-Man
- Kurt in Ant-Man and the Wasp
- Warren Mears in Buffy the Vampire Slayer
- Leo Fitz in Agents of S.H.I.E.L.D.
- Davis Bloome in Smallville
- Shane Ross in Grey's Anatomy
- Ezra Fitzgerald in Pretty Little Liars
- Ernest Rodriguez in Lions for Lambs
- Javier Suarez in Dirty Dancing: Havana Nights
- Alex in He's Just Not That Into You
- Ron Stallworth in BlacKkKlansman
- Jack Mercer in Four Brothers
- C.C. White in Dreamgirls
- Nate Cooper in The Devil Wears Prada
- Daniel Williams in Bride Wars
- Sam Monroe in Life as a House
- Henry in Crossroads
- Nick Memphis in Shooter
- Rick Meade in Mission: Impossible III
- Sir Lancelot in Night at the Museum: Secret of the Tomb
- Aaron Marker in 12 Monkeys
- Pikachu in Pokémon Detective Pikachu
- Makoto Date in Like a Dragon: Yakuza
