= Myriam Catania =

Italian actress and voice actress

- Born: 12 December 1979 (age 46); Rome, Italy
- Occupations: Actress; voice actress
- Years active: 1985-present
- Spouse: Luca Argentero (m. 2009; div. 2016)
- Children: 1
- Mother: Rossella Izzo
- Relatives: Renato Izzo (grandfather); Simona Izzo (aunt); Fiamma Izzo (aunt); Giuppy Izzo (aunt); Francesco Venditti (cousin)

Myriam Catania (born 12 December 1979) is an Italian actress and voice actress.

== Biography ==
Born in Rome and the daughter of actress and dubber Rossella Izzo, Catania makes frequent acting and dubbing collaborations with members of her family. She began her on-screen career as a child actress on television in 1985 and she made her debut appearance on film in 1999. She appeared in over 16 films and 23 television shows during her career and she also worked as a voice actress. She is the official Italian voice actress of Keira Knightley, Amanda Seyfried and Jessica Alba. Catania is also well known for providing the Italian voices of Anna Paquin, Mary Elizabeth Winstead, Olivia Wilde, Alexis Bledel, Malin Åkerman and more.

Catania’s most popular dubbing contributions include Elizabeth Swann (portrayed by Keira Knightley) in the Pirates of the Caribbean film series and Rogue (portrayed by Anna Paquin) in the X-Men film series (excluding X-Men: The Last Stand). On television, she dubbed Rory Gilmore (portrayed by Alexis Bledel) in Gilmore Girls and Willow Rosenberg (portrayed by Alyson Hannigan in Buffy the Vampire Slayer. In Catania’s animated roles, she voiced Jenny in the Italian version of Oliver & Company. This was among her earliest voice acting contributions.

=== Personal life ===
After five years of dating, Catania married actor Luca Argentero in 2009. They divorced in 2016. She is now in a relationship with French publicist Quentin Kammermann and they have a son, Jacques, who was born in 2017.

== Filmography ==
=== Cinema ===
- Love in the Mirror (1999)
- Break Free (2003)
- Stregeria (2003)
- Io no (2003)
- What Will Happen to Us (2004)
- Dalla parte giusta (2005)
- L'uomo privato (2007)
- La bella gente (2009)
- Alice (2010)
- Tutto l'amore del mondo (2010)
- Some Say No (2011)
- Il sesso aggiunto (2011)
- Ci vediamo a casa (2012)
- Canepazzo (2012)
- The Veil of Maya (2017)
- Lasciami per sempre (2017)
- Anche senza di te (2018)

=== Television ===
- Un ponte per Terabithia (1985)
- Pizzaiolo et Mozzarel (1985)
- Papà prende moglie (1993)
- Caro maestro (1996)
- Una donna per amico (1998-1999)
- Ciao professore (1999)
- Baldini e Simoni (1999)
- Non lasciamoci più (2000)
- The Wings of Life (2000)
- Cuccioli (2002)
- Così com'è la vita (2002)
- Lo zio d'America (2002-2006)
- L'inganno (2003)
- Carabinieri (2005)
- Provaci ancora prof (2005)
- Gente di mare (2005-2007)
- Questa è la mia terra (2006-2008)
- L'ispettore Coliandro (2010)
- È arrivata la felicità (2015)
- Amore a prima vista (2019)

== Dubbing roles ==
=== Animation ===
- Jenny in Oliver & Company
- Susan Murphy / Ginormica in Monsters vs. Aliens
- Susan Murphy / Ginormica in Monsters vs Aliens: The Series (ep. 1-26)
- Anne-Marie in All Dogs Go to Heaven
- Nita in Brother Bear 2
- Augie Shumway in ALF: The Animated Series

=== Live action ===
- Elizabeth Swann in Pirates of the Caribbean: The Curse of the Black Pearl
- Elizabeth Swann in Pirates of the Caribbean: Dead Man's Chest
- Elizabeth Swann in Pirates of the Caribbean: At World's End
- Frankie Almond Smith in The Hole
- Lara Guishar Antipova in Doctor Zhivago
- Guinevere in King Arthur
- Jackie Price in The Jacket
- Elizabeth Bennet in Pride & Prejudice
- Cecilia Tallis in Atonement
- Leah in Stories of Lost Souls
- Hélène Joncour in Silk
- Vera in The Edge of Love
- Joanna Reed in Last Night
- Charlotte in London Boulevard
- Penny Lockhart in Seeking a Friend for the End of the World
- Anna Karenina in Anna Karenina
- Cathy Muller in Jack Ryan: Shadow Recruit
- Gretta James in Begin Again
- Megan Birch in Laggies
- Joan Clarke in The Imitation Game
- Jan Arnold in Everest
- Gabrielle Colette in Colette
- Rachael Morgan in The Aftermath
- Sophie Sheridan in Mamma Mia!
- Chloe Sweeney in Chloe
- Savannah Lynn Curtis in Dear John
- Sylvia Weis in In Time
- Cosette in Les Misérables
- Linda Lovelace in Lovelace
- Louise in A Million Ways to Die in the West
- Darby Massey in While We're Young
- Samantha Jackson in Ted 2
- Ruby in Love the Coopers
- Samantha Swoboda in P.U.N.K.S.
- Nancy Callahan in Sin City
- Nancy Callahan in Sin City: A Dame to Kill For
- Sydney Wells in The Eye
- Sartana Rivera in Machete
- Sartana Rivera in Machete Kills
- Andi Garcia in Little Fockers
- Joyce Lakeland in The Killer Inside Me
- Marissa Wilson in Spy Kids: All the Time in the World
- Charlie in Stretch
- Victoria Knox in Barely Lethal
- Jessica Alba in Entourage
- Maggie Price in The Veil
- Gina Thornton in Mechanic: Resurrection
- Beth Flowers in El Camino Christmas
- Maya Graham in Flipper
- Max Guevara / X5-452 in Dark Angel
- Marie D'Ancanto / Rogue in X-Men
- Marie D'Ancanto / Rogue in X2
- Marie D'Ancanto / Rogue in X-Men: Days of Future Past
- Gwen Grayson / Royal Pain / Sue Tennyson in Sky High
- Ramona Flowers in Scott Pilgrim vs. the World
- Kate Lloyd in The Thing
- Holly Keely in The Spectacular Now
- Rowan Blackshaw in The Returned
- Rory Gilmore in Gilmore Girls
- Willow Rosenberg in Buffy the Vampire Slayer
- Ashley Banks in The Fresh Prince of Bel-Air
- Marti Perkins in Hellcats
- Lila in The Heartbreak Kid
- Ronnie in Couples Retreat
- Kate Harrison in Trophy Wife
- Cady Heron in Mean Girls
- Lindsay Lohan in The Holiday
- Ella Swenson in Cowboys & Aliens
- Suzy Miller in Rush
- Zoe McConnell in The Lazarus Effect
- Abby Dempsey in Life Itself
- Kasumi in DOA: Dead or Alive
- Jasmine Trussell in Parenthood
- Caroline Enys in Poldark
- Kris Furillo in Wildfire
- Lena Kaligaris in The Sisterhood of the Traveling Pants 2
- Kitty Friedman in Jenny's Wedding
- Isabella of Angoulême in Robin Hood
- Mel Ames in Twilight
- Alex Latourno in 8 Mile
- Carly Spencer in Transformers: Dark of the Moon
- Rayna Boyanova in Spy
- Wendy Hood in The Ice Storm
- Bela Talbot in Supernatural
- Riley Perrin in Baby Daddy
- Lana Tisdel in Boys Don't Cry
- Rachel Ashe in Beverly Hills Chihuahua
- Dr. Green / Viper in The Wolverine
- Ann August in Anywhere But Here
- Penny Pinchelow in Dumb and Dumber To
- Skyler Cooper in What to Expect When You're Expecting
- Samantha Shane in Battleship
- Charlotte in About Time
- Caterina da Cremona in Leonardo
