= Camere da letto =

- Directed by: Simona Izzo
- Written by: Simona Izzo; Graziano Diana
- Produced by: Vittorio Cecchi Gori; Rita Rusic
- Starring: Diego Abatantuono; Maria Grazia Cucinotta; Ricky Tognazzi; Simona Izzo; Giobbe Covatta; Giuppy Izzi; Isa Bellini; Chiara Salerno
- Cinematography: Alessio Gelsini Torresi
- Music by: Nicola Piovani
- Distributed by: Variety Distribution
- Release date: 28 March 1997
- Running time: 100 minute
- Country: Italy
- Language: Italian

Camere da letto (Bedrooms) is a 1997 Italian romantic comedy film written, directed and written by Simona Izzo.

== Plot ==
Four couples face challenges in Rome's Ostia neighborhood. Dario and Maddalena confront financial difficulties and family tensions. Sandro, a loner, clings to memories of a past love. Married artists, Margherita and Fabrizio, navigate a marital crisis. Meanwhile, Dario's nephew, Lorenzo, experiences his first love.

== Cast ==
- Diego Abatantuono as Dario
- Maria Grazia Cucinotta as Maddalena
- Giobbe Covatta as Sandro
- Ricky Tognazzi as Fabrizio
- Simona Izzo as Margherita
- Francesco Venditti as Lorenzo
- Chiara Salerno as Anna
- Giuppy Izzo as Tatiana
- Isa Bellini as Grandma
- Alexandra La Capria as Luisa

== Reception ==
The film opened on 74 screens and grossed $390,864 in its opening weekend, being the fifth highest-grossing film in Italy for the weekend.

== See also ==
- List of Italian films of 1997
