= Simpatici & antipatici =

1998 Italian comedy film

- Directed by: Christian De Sica
- Written by: Christian De Sica; Carlo Vanzina; Enrico Vanzina
- Produced by: Pietro Valsecchi
- Starring: Christian De Sica; Leo Gullotta; Marco Messeri; Monica Scattini; Stefano Masciarelli; Paolo Conticini; Barbara Snellenburg; Eva Grimaldi; Simona Izzo; Alessandro Haber; Gianfranco Funari; Cinzia Mascoli; Beatriz Rico; Riccardo Garrone; Piero Natoli; Angelo Bernabucci
- Cinematography: Ennio Guarnieri
- Edited by: Paolo Benassi
- Music by: Manuel De Sica
- Release date: 20 February 1998 (Italy)
- Running time: 92 minutes
- Country: Italy
- Language: Italian

Simpatici & antipatici (lit. 'Nice & mean') is a 1998 Italian comedy film directed by Christian De Sica. The film was released on February 20, 1998.

== Cast ==
- Christian De Sica as Roberto
- Gianfranco Funari as Alberto Cecchini
- Marco Messeri as Ugo
- Cinzia Mascoli as Livia
- Angelo Bernabucci as Doctor Petruzzi
- Leo Gullotta as Gigetto
- Piero Natoli as Mario Bonfanti
- Alessandro Haber as Carlo Medis
- Eva Grimaldi as Michela
- Andrea Roncato as Andrea
- Paolo Conticini as Paolo
- Riccardo Garrone as Fausto
- Remo Remotti as Augusto
- Alberto Molinari as Luca
- Barbara Snellenburg as Viki Bond
- Stefano Masciarelli as Walter
- Beatriz Rico as Dolores
- Monica Scattini as Nicoletta
- Simona Izzo as Simona
- Barbarella as Barbie
- Carlos Alberto Valles as Rafael Muñeco
- Jonis Bascir as Ettore
- Claudia Poggiani as Elena
- Claudia Muzii as Alex
- Francesca Nunzi as Marisa
- Marina Perzy as Marcella
