= Renato Izzo =

Italian voice actor (1929–2009)

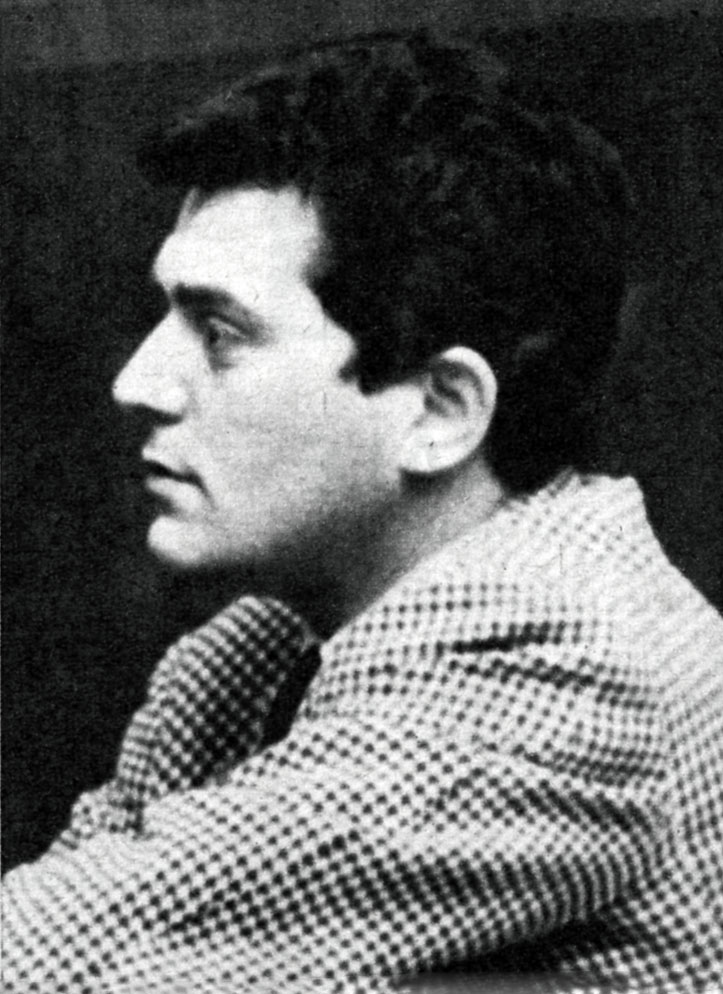
- Izzo in 1963
- Born: 15 June 1929; Campobasso, Kingdom of Italy
- Died: 30 July 2009 (aged 80); Rome, Italy
- Occupations: Actor; voice actor; screenwriter; dubbing director
- Years active: 1945–2009
- Spouse: Liliana D'Amico
- Children: Rossella; Simona; Fiamma; Giuppy
- Relatives: Loredana Nicosia (niece); Myriam Catania (granddaughter); Francesco Venditti (grandson)

Renato Izzo (15 June 1929 – 30 July 2009) was an Italian actor, voice actor and screenwriter.

== Biography ==
Born in Campobasso to Romolo and Giuseppina Izzo and the second of eight children, Izzo was considered to be among the most popular and influential actors and dubbers across Italy. He founded the dubbing society Gruppo Trenta (now Pumais Due) in 1980, and he helped other important dubbers achieve fame, such as Massimo Lodolo, Tonino Accolla, Perla Liberatori, Claudia Catani and Paolo Buglioni. He also incorporated his children and grandchildren into his ventures.

Izzo was known for dubbing actors such as Robert Hoffmann, Paul Newman, Tomas Milian, Mark Damon and Clint Eastwood. He was also renowned for his direction of the Italian dubbed versions of Apocalypse Now and Taxi Driver.

=== Personal life ===
Renato Izzo had four daughters who are all voice actresses: Rossella, Simona, Fiamma and Giuppy Izzo.

== Death ==
Izzo died in Rome on 30 July 2009, following a stroke, at the age of 80.

== Filmography ==
=== Cinema ===
- Altair (1955)
- Wives and Obscurities (1956)
- Il cavaliere dai cento volti (1960)
- Tiger of the Seven Seas (1962)
- Obiettivo ragazze (1963)
- The Hours of Love (1963)
- Excellent Cadavers (1999)
