= Un orso chiamato Arturo =

- Directed by: Sergio Martino
- Written by: Nino Marino; Sergio Martino
- Starring: George Segal; Carol Alt; Doris Von Thury; Birte Berg; Mattia Sbragia; Stefano Masciarelli
- Cinematography: Giancarlo Ferrando
- Edited by: Eugenio Alabiso
- Music by: Luigi Ceccarelli
- Production companies: Dania Film; National Cinematografica; RAI Due
- Distributed by: Warner Bros. Italia
- Release date: 1992
- Languages: Italian; English

Un orso chiamato Arturo (released in some international territories as A Bear Named Arthur) is a 1992 Italian film directed by Sergio Martino. A spy comedy in both English and Italian, it starred George Segal as a successful film composer and Carol Alt as the secret agent that he inadvertently gets mixed up with.

== Cast ==
- George Segal - Billy
- Carol Alt - Alice
- Doris Von Thury - Billy's Wife
- Birte Berg - Psychoanalyst
- Mattia Sbragia - Capone
- Stefano Masciarelli - Inspector
- Hal Yamanouchi - Ohnishi
- Edmund Purdom - Academy Awards Presenter
- David Brandon - Nazi Officer
- Gianfranco Barra - Quaestor
- Clara Colosimo - Maria
- Valeria Marini - Vincent's Woman
