= Sentimental Maniacs =

- Theatrical release poster
- Directed by: Simona Izzo
- Cinematography: Alessio Gelsini Torresi
- Edited by: Angelo Nicolini
- Music by: Antonio Di Pofi
- Production companies: DIR International Film; Union P.N.
- Distributed by: United International Pictures
- Release date: 1994
- Box office: $3.3 million (Italy)

Sentimental Maniacs (Italian: Maniaci sentimentali) is a 1994 Italian romantic comedy film. It marked the directorial debut of the actress and voice actress Simona Izzo, who won the David di Donatello for Best New Director. For her performance, Monica Scattini won the David di Donatello for Best Supporting Actress, while Alessandro Benvenuti received the Ciak d'oro for Best Supporting Actor.

== Cast ==
- Ricky Tognazzi: Luca
- Barbara De Rossi: Mara
- Alessandro Benvenuti: Sandro
- Monica Scattini: Serena
- Veronika Logan: Giusy
- Alessandro Giannini: Maurizio
- Clelia Rondinella: Claudia
- Pat O'Hara: Mamy
