= Us in the U.S. =

- Film poster
- Italian: Mai Stati Uniti
- Directed by: Carlo Vanzina
- Written by: Carlo Vanzina; Enrico Vanzina; Edoardo Falcone
- Produced by: Federica Lucisano
- Starring: Vincenzo Salemme; Ambra Angiolini; Ricky Memphis; Anna Foglietta; Giovanni Vernia; Maurizio Mattioli
- Cinematography: Enrico Lucidi
- Edited by: Luca Montanari
- Release date: 3 January 2013
- Running time: 90 minutes
- Country: Italy
- Language: Italian

Us in the U.S. (Italian: Mai Stati Uniti) is a 2013 Italian road comedy film directed by Carlo Vanzina.

== Cast ==
- Vincenzo Salemme as Antonio
- Ambra Angiolini as Angela
- Ricky Memphis as Nino
- Anna Foglietta as Carmen
- Giovanni Vernia as Michele
- Maurizio Mattioli as Oreste Bracchi
- Andrea Pittorino as Roby
- Paolo Bessegato as Notary Garbarino
- Daniela Piperno as the psychiatrist
