= Crack (film) =

Italian sports drama film

- Directed by: Giulio Base
- Screenplay by: Giulio Base; Franco Bertini
- Produced by: Claudio Bonivento
- Starring: Giulio Base; Gianmarco Tognazzi
- Cinematography: Alessio Gelsini Torresi
- Edited by: Claudio Di Mauro
- Music by: Oscar Prudente
- Release date: 1991
- Language: Italian

Crack is a 1991 Italian sports drama film co-written and directed by Giulio Base, in his directorial debut. It premiered at the 48th Venice International Film Festival.

== Cast ==
- Giulio Base as Wolfango
- Gianmarco Tognazzi as Francesco
- Pietro Genuardi as Sascia
- Giuseppe Pianviti as Michele
- Franco Bertini as Rodolfo
- Antonella Ponziani as Roberta
- Marcello Perracchio as Antonio Forte
- Franco Pistoni as Gino
- Valeria Marini as Moira
- Mario Brega as Trainer

== Production ==
The film is an adaptation of Franco Bertini's play of the same title, with Base reprising the role he had performed on stage. Principal photography began in late February 1991. The film had a budget of about 2 billion lire.

== Release ==
The film had its world premiere at the 48th edition of the Venice Film Festival, in the Mattinate del Cinema Italiano ("Italian Cinema Mornings") sidebar. It was also screened at the 39th San Sebastián International Film Festival, where it won the Zabaltegi Award.

== Reception ==
Italian film critic Maurizio Fantoni Minnella praised the film, which "exhibits a distinctive visual approach to its narrative material", characterized by a directing style that emphasizes immediacy and a clearly identifiable narrative rhythm. Alessandra Levantesi from La Stampa described it as "a melodrama structured around an aesthetic of violence, incorporating rhythmic variations typical of American action cinema", whose "strongest qualities [...] emerge in the more intimate, almost twilight-like scenes, enhanced by Alessio Gelsini's painterly cinematography".

For this film, Base received a David di Donatello nomination as best new director. For his performance, Gianmarco Tognazzi was awarded a Silver Plaque at the 1991 Grolla d'oro Awards.
