= List of 1992 box office number-one films in Italy =

This is a list of films which have placed number one at the weekly box office in Italy during 1992. Amounts are in lire and are based on a sample of key cities.

== Number-one films ==
| † | This implies the highest-grossing movie of the year. |

| # | Week ending | Film | Box office | Notes | Ref |
|---|---|---|---|---|---|
| 1 | 5 January 1992 | Robin Hood: Prince of Thieves | ₤4,940,365,200 | | |
| 2 | 12 January 1992 | Robin Hood: Prince of Thieves | ₤3,847,515,600 | | |
| 3 | 19 January 1992 | Robin Hood: Prince of Thieves | ₤2,117,978,400 | | |
| 4 | 26 January 1992 | Robin Hood: Prince of Thieves | ₤1,430,959,200 | | |
| 5 | 2 February 1992 | Hot Shots! | ₤1,666,680,000 | Hot Shots! reached number one in its second week of release | |
| 6 | 9 February 1992 | Maledetto il giorno che t'ho incontrato | ₤1,898,227,060 | Maledetto il giorno che t'ho incontrato reached number one in its second week of release | |
| 7 | 16 February 1992 | Maledetto il giorno che t'ho incontrato | ₤2,207,856,000 | | |
| 8 | 23 February 1992 | JFK | ₤1,888,645,240 | JFK reached number one in its third week of release | |
| 9 | 1 March 1992 | JFK | ₤1,433,838,000 | | |
| 10 | 8 March 1992 | Cape Fear | ₤1,187,200,800 | | |
| 11 | 15 March 1992 | Cape Fear | ₤1,438,059,600 | | |
| 12 | 22 March 1992 | Cape Fear | ₤1,150,297,200 | | |
| 13 | 29 March 1992 | Hook | ₤1,285,281,080 | | |
| 14 | 5 April 1992 | Hook | ₤2,520,365,720 | | |
| 15 | 12 April 1992 | Hook | ₤1,568,476,000 | | |
| 16 | 19 April 1992 | Hook | ₤1,439,158,880 | | |
| 17 | 26 April 1992 | Beethoven | ₤1,155,570,880 | Beethoven reached number one in its third week of release | |
| 18 | 3 May 1992 | Beethoven | ₤1,183,338,720 | | |
| 19 | 10 May 1992 | Beethoven | ₤406,280,070 | | |
| 20 | 17 May 1992 | The Stolen Children | ₤542,463,600 | The Stolen Children reached number one in its sixth week of release | |
| 21 | 24 May 1992 | The Stolen Children | ₤1,196,322,000 | | |
| 22 | 31 May 1992 | The Stolen Children | ₤908,446,800 | | |
| 23 | 7 June 1992 | The Stolen Children | ₤648,597,600 | | |
| 24 | 14 June 1992 | The Stolen Children | ₤403,101,420 | | |
| 25 | 21 June 1992 | Blue Steel | ₤263,576,550 | Blue Steel reached number one in its fourth week of release | |
| 26 | 28 June 1992 | The Stolen Children | ₤310,668,600 | | |
| 27 | 5 July 1992 | The Stolen Children | ₤158,700,300 | | |
| 28 | 12 July 1992 | Point Break (reissue) | ₤136,693,700 | Point Break reached number one in its second week of release | |
| 29 | 19 July 1992 | Point Break (reissue) | ₤90,670,800 | | |
| 30 | 26 July 1992 | Point Break (reissue) | ₤65,806,400 | | |
| 31 | 6 August 1992 | Point Break (reissue) | TBD | | |
| 32 | 13 August 1992 | Point Break (reissue) | TBD | | |
| 33 | 20 August 1992 | Point Break (reissue) | TBD | | |
| 34 | 27 August 1992 | Tokyo Decadence | ₤163,658,250 | | |
| 35 | 3 September 1992 | Tokyo Decadence | TBD | | |
| 36 | 10 September 1992 | Sleepwalkers | ₤398,357,400 | | |
| 37 | 17 September 1992 | Batman Returns | ₤1,404,393,100 | | |
| 38 | 24 September 1992 | Basic Instinct † | ₤6,800,000,000 | Basic Instinct set an opening week record. It grossed ₤3,065,058,750 for the weekend ended September 20 | |
| 39 | 27 September 1992 | Basic Instinct † | ₤3,070,821,690 | Weekend only | |
| 40 | 4 October 1992 | Basic Instinct † | ₤4,138,110,600 | Weekend only | |
| 41 | 11 October 1992 | Basic Instinct † | ₤3,043,596,910 | Weekend only | |
| 42 | 18 October 1992 | Basic Instinct † | ₤2,726,914,790 | | |
| 43 | 25 October 1992 | Patriot Games | ₤1,777,787,910 | Patriot Games reached number one in its third week of release | |
| 44 | 1 November 1992 | Lethal Weapon 3 | ₤2,471,483,300 | Lethal Weapon 3 reached number one in its second week of release | |
| 45 | 8 November 1992 | Lethal Weapon 3 | ₤2,134,253,880 | | |
| 46 | 15 November 1992 | Anni 90 | ₤2,141,141,640 | Anni 90 reached number one in its third week of release | |
| 47 | 22 November 1992 | Anni 90 | ₤1,386,430,320 | | |
| 48 | 29 November 1992 | Fried Green Tomatoes | ₤1,076,364,960 | | |
| 49 | 6 December 1992 | Beauty and the Beast | ₤1,789,839,060 | | |
| 50 | 17 December 1992 | Beauty and the Beast | ₤4,596,461,730 | 11 day period | |
| 51 | 24 December 1992 | Beauty and the Beast | ₤4,900,361,200 | | |
| 52 | 31 December 1992 | Beauty and the Beast | ₤5,532,382,800 | Weekend only | |

== Highest-grossing films ==
Highest-grossing films in Italy to 13 December 1992

| Rank | Title | Distributor | Gross (US$m) |
|---|---|---|---|
| 1. | Basic Instinct | Penta | 20.0 |
| 2. | Robin Hood: Prince of Thieves | Artisti Associati | 15.7 |
| 3. | Beauty and the Beast | Warner Bros. | 12.0 |
| 4. | Donne con le gonne | Filmauro | 11.7 |
| 5. | Terminator 2: Judgment Day | Penta | 9.3 |
| 6. | Vacanze di Natale '91 | Filmauro | 7.4 |
| 7. | Pensavo fosse amore, invece era un calesse | Penta | 6.9 |
| 8. | Hook | Columbia TriStar | 6.6 |
| 9. | JFK | Warner Bros. | 6.5 |
| 10. | Lethal Weapon 3 | Warner Bros. | 6.5 |

== See also ==
- Lists of box office number-one films

| 1992 | Succeeded by 1993 |
