= Caro maestro =

- Genre: Comedy
- Created by: Massimo Del Frate
- Starring: Marco Columbro; Elena Sofia Ricci; Francesca Reggiani; Nicola Pistoia; Roberta Scardola; Sandra Mondaini
- Country of origin: Italy
- No. of seasons: 2
- No. of episodes: 13

Production
- Running time: 90 minutes

Original release
- Network: Canale 5
- Release: March 8, 1996 – April 17, 1997

Caro maestro (Dear teacher) is an Italian television comedy series which aired from 1996 to 1997 on Canale 5. The series follows Stefano Giusti (Marco Columbro), a bus driver who is allowed to teach at Forte dei Marmi elementary school in which he was raised. There, he meets and falls in love with Elisa (Elena Sofia Ricci), teacher and director of the school, with whom he used to date.

== Cast ==
- Marco Columbro: Stefano Giusti
- Elena Sofia Ricci: Elisa Terenzi
- Sandra Mondaini: zia Ottilia
- Francesca Reggiani: Monica Giusti
- Antonella Elia: Antonella
- Stefania Sandrelli: Francesca Deodato
- Carlotta Tesconi: Alice
- Nicola Pistoia: Carlo Carloni
- Isa Gallinelli: Claudia De Santis
- Francesco Bonelli: Bruno Verticella
- Barbara Cupisti: Giovanna Gimignano
- Edoardo Nevola: padre Andrea Bonelli
- Claudia Vegliante: madre di Carlotta
- Franca Valeri: Elvira Piersanti
- Pino Ammendola: padre di Claudio
- Pino Colizzi: architetto Chiari
- Roberto Alpi: Cesare Catania
- Vittorio Amandola: Saverio Serranti
- Francesco Venditti: Fabio
- Myriam Catania: fidanzata di Fabio
- Margot Sikabonyi: Cristina (2ª season)

== See also ==
- List of Italian television series
