= Lontano da dove =

- Directed by: Stefania Casini; Francesca Marciano
- Written by: Stefania Casini; Francesca Marciano
- Produced by: Renzo Rossellini
- Starring: Claudio Amendola; Stefania Casini
- Cinematography: Romano Albani
- Edited by: Mauro Bonanni
- Music by: Lucio Dalla
- Release date: 1983
- Country: Italy
- Language: Italian

Lontano da dove (Away from where) is a 1983 Italian romantic drama film written and directed by Stefania Casini and Francesca Marciano. For this film Monica Scattini was awarded Nastro d'Argento for best supporting actress.

It was one of the last releases of Gaumont's Italian subsidiary, which shut down the bulk of its activities around this time due to financial losses from its parent company in France.

== Plot ==
Mario, who has just finished his military service, arrives in New York where Giampaolo, a record friend of his, lives. Mario enthusiastically immerses himself in the life of the city, and frequents a group of Italians that includes Daniela, a receptionist at the headquarters of an Italian newspaper, who however cultivates the dream of becoming an actress and for this reason attends an acting school; Giacomini, a political journalist who, on the other hand, seems more interested in costume; and Desideria, an elusive character who boasts of acquaintances with famous artists and actors.

The path of discovery undertaken by Mario is accompanied by the growing sense of disillusionment suffered by Daniela and Giacomini who, during an excursion to Coney Island, compare New York with Rome and conclude that, in the end, the latter, although provincial and less cosmopolitan, it has its merits. Giacomini then decides to return to Rome, while Daniela plans to reconnect with Andrea, a suitor who lives in Italy.

== Cast ==
- Claudio Amendola as Mario
- Stefania Casini as Desideria
- Victor Cavallo as Giacomini
- Monica Scattini as Daniela
- Michael Wright as Sylvester
- Luisella Boni as Eleonora Serpieri Altobilli
- Franco Schipani as Giampaolo

== See also ==
- List of Italian films of 1983
