= Alessio Gelsini Torresi =

Italian cinematographer (born 1951)

- Born: 17 February 1951 (age 75); Rome, Italy
- Occupation: Cinematographer

Alessio Gelsini Torresi (born 17 February 1951) is an Italian cinematographer, sometimes credited as Alessio Gelsini.

Born in Rome, Gelsini made his film debut with Pier Paolo Pasolini's The Decameron in 1971. In 1991, he won the Globo d'oro, the Grolla d'oro and the Ciak d'oro for the cinematography of Americano rosso. He also won the 1993 David di Donatello for Best Cinematography for Marco Risi's The Escort.

== Selected filmography ==
- Bonnie and Clyde Italian Style (1983)
- Snack Bar Budapest (1988)
- Little Misunderstandings (1989)
- The Station (1990)
- Ultra (1991)
- Red American (1991)
- Crack (1991)
- The Escort (1993)
- Sentimental Maniacs (1994)
- Heartless (1995)
- School (1995)
- Jack Frusciante Left the Band (1996)
- Strangled Lives (1996)
- Bedrooms (1997)
- Excellent Cadavers (1999)
- The Emperor's New Clothes (2001)
- Do You Mind If I Kiss Mommy? (2003)
- Pontormo – un amore eretico (2004)
- Ice on Fire (2005)
- Amore che vieni, amore che vai (2008)
- Sul mare (2010)
