= Monica Scattini =

Italian actress (1956–2015)

- Born: 1 February 1956; Rome, Italy
- Died: 4 February 2015 (aged 59); Rome, Italy
- Occupation: Actress
- Years active: 1974–2015
- Height: 1.73 m (5 ft 8 in)
- Father: Luigi Scattini
- Awards: David di Donatello – Best Supporting Actress; 1994 Sentimental Maniacs Nastro d'Argento – Best Supporting Actress; 1984 Away from where

Monica Scattini (1 February 1956 – 4 February 2015) was an Italian actress. The daughter of director Luigi Scattini, her film appearances include Maniaci sentimentali, for which she won a David di Donatello for Best Supporting Actress, and Lontano da dove, for which she was awarded with a Nastro d'Argento for Best Supporting Actress. Her television credits include Un ciclone in famiglia and Recipe for Crime. She also appeared in the films Nine, Le Bal, One from the Heart, and Nora.

Scattini died from cancer on 4 February 2015, aged 59.

== Filmography ==
=== Films ===
Year	Title	Role	Notes
1974	The Murri Affair	Francina	Feature film debut
1977	Blue Nude	Young tourist	Uncredited
1979	Concorde Affaire '79	Woman in the office	Cameo
1982	One from the Heart	Understudy	
1982	Malamore	Sonia	
1983	Lontano da dove	Daniela	
1983	Le Bal	Myope girl	Uncredited
1984	A Boy and a Girl	Carmen	
1987	Il mistero del panino assassino	Lella	
1987	The Family	Aunt Ornella	
1987	Rimini Rimini	Simona	
1988	Love Dream	Nicoletta	
1990	La bocca	Marta	
1990	I'll Be Going Now	Margherita	
1992	Parenti serpenti	Milena	
1992	Un'altra vita	Luisanna	
1994	The True Life of Antonio H.	Herself	
1994	Love Burns	Maria	
1994	Sentimental Maniacs	Serena	
1995	Men Men Men	Simonetta	
1996	Bits and Pieces	Monica	
1996	Un paradiso di bugie	Martina	
1996	Bruno aspetta in macchina	Gisella	
1997	Stressati	Adriana	
1998	Simpatici & antipatici	Nicoletta	
1999	In the Beginning There Was Underwear	Lady driver	Cameo
1999	Vacanze di Natale 2000	Patrizia Covelli	
2000	Nora	Amalia Globonick	
2000	Film	Monica	
2001	Come si fa un Martini	Anna	
2003	Scacco pazzo	Marianna	
2007	Lessons in Chocolate	Letizia	
2009	Nine	Pension matron	Cameo
2009	Feisburn - Il film	Woman with dog	Segment: "L'arte di arrangiarsi"
2010	Due vite per caso	Ilaria Carli	
2010	Tutto l'amore del mondo	Silvia	
2011	Tutta colpa della musica	Grazia	
2012	Baci salati	Virginia	
2014	A Woman as a Friend	Elga	
2016	Prigioniero della mia libertà	Caterina	Final film role; posthumous release

=== Television ===
Year	Title	Role	Notes
1988	Zanzibar	Lola	Episode: "Telefono caldo"
1988–1989	La TV delle ragazze	Herself	Variety show
1989	Ovidio	Silvia	Main role; 35 episodes
1991	Marie Curie, une femme honorable	Missy Melloney	Miniseries
1998	Da cosa nasce cosa	Giovanna Sperlari	Television film
1999	Excellent Cadavers	Francesca's colleague	Television film; cameo appearance
2002	Lo zio d'America	Polissena Vanvitelli	Main role (season 1); 8 episodes
2003	Un papà quasi perfetto	Giovanna	Miniseries
2005	La signora delle camelie	Flora	Television film
2005	Elisa di Rivombrosa	Eugenia Bonomi	Main role (season 2); 13 episodes
2005–2008	Un ciclone in famiglia	Simonetta Ricasoli	Main role; 22 episodes
2008	VIP	Ilaria	Television film
2010	I delitti del cuoco	Carlina Castagna	Main role; 9 episodes
2011	Notte prima degli esami '82	Maria Martinelli	Miniseries
