= Strangled Lives =

1996 film

- DVD cover
- Directed by: Ricky Tognazzi
- Written by: Ricky Tognazzi; Graziano Diana; Simona Izzo; Giuseppe Manfridi
- Produced by: Vittorio Cecchi Gori
- Starring: Vincent Lindon; Sabrina Ferilli; Luca Zingaretti; Ricky Memphis
- Cinematography: Alessio Gelsini Torresi
- Music by: Ennio Morricone
- Release date: 23 February 1996
- Running time: 108 minutes
- Countries: Italy; France
- Language: Italian

Strangled Lives (Italian: Vite strozzate, French: Le jour du chien) is a 1996 French-Italian crime film directed by Ricky Tognazzi. It was entered into the 46th Berlin International Film Festival where it won the Alfred Bauer Prize.

== Cast ==
- Vincent Lindon as Francesco
- Sabrina Ferilli as Miriam
- Luca Zingaretti as Sergio
- Ricky Memphis as Claudio
- Lina Sastri as Sauro
- Francesco Venditti as Robertino
- Violante Placido as Laura
- Vittorio Amandola as Antiquario
- Giuseppe Manfridi as Brizzi
- Marilyn Pater as Consuelo
- Giuppy Izzo as Daniela
- Antonello Morroni as Faina
