= Il cielo in una stanza (film) =

- Directed by: Carlo Vanzina
- Written by: Enrico Vanzina; Carlo Vanzina
- Produced by: Aurelio De Laurentiis
- Starring: Elio Germano; Gabriele Mainetti; Alessandro Cianflone; Francesco Venditti; Cinzia Mascoli; Maurizio Mattioli; Ricky Tognazzi
- Cinematography: Carlo Tafani
- Edited by: Sergio Montanari
- Music by: Pino Nicolosi
- Release date: 1999
- Running time: 103 minutes
- Country: Italy
- Language: Italian

Il cielo in una stanza (Heaven in a Room) is a 1999 Italian comedy film directed by Carlo Vanzina.

== Plot ==
Paolo hates his father because he was too strict with him. One day Paolo tells him that he would prefer never to have been born and to live happy and carefree in the glorious 1960s. Paolo is immediately satisfied by fate, and finds himself transported back into the 1960s, when his father was still a child. Paolo immediately realizes that he desired nonsense from destiny, and tries to replace his trouble, knowing a young man (his father as a man), trying to make him fall in love with the girl of his dreams (Paolo's mother).

== Cast ==
- Gabriele Mainetti: Marco
- Ricky Tognazzi: Paolo, Marco's father
- Elio Germano: Paolo as a teenager
- Alessandro Cianflone: Massimo
- Francesco Venditti: Claudio
- Cinzia Mascoli: Paolo's mother
- Maurizio Mattioli: Paolo's father
- Tosca D'Aquino: Lola
- Cristiana Capotondi
- Elisabetta Pellini
- Sascha Zacharias
