= List of 1993 box office number-one films in Italy =

This is a list of films which have placed number one at the box office in Italy during 1993. Amounts are in lire and are based on a sample of key cities.

== Number-one films ==
| † | This implies the highest-grossing movie of the year. |

| # | Week ending | Film | Box office | Notes | Ref |
|---|---|---|---|---|---|
| 1 | 7 January 1993 | Beauty and the Beast | ₤5,420,836,680 | | |
| 2 | 14 January 1993 | The Bodyguard | ₤4,319,001,120 | The Bodyguard reached number one in its fifth week of release | |
| 3 | 21 January 1993 | The Bodyguard | ₤3,447,230,850 | | |
| 4 | 28 January 1993 | The Bodyguard | ₤2,300,000,000 | | |
| 5 | 4 February 1993 | Bram Stoker's Dracula | ₤3,332,397,600 | | |
| 6 | 7 February 1993 | Bram Stoker's Dracula | ₤2,879,238,000 | | |
| 7 | 14 February 1993 | Sister Act | ₤2,001,846,000 | Sister Act reached number one in its third week of release | |
| 8 | 21 February 1993 | Sister Act | ₤1,714,837,850 | | |
| 9 | 28 February 1993 | Sister Act | ₤1,295,762,800 | | |
| 10 | 7 March 1993 | Sister Act | ₤883,500,230 | | |
| 11 | 14 March 1993 | Sommersby | ₤1,904,449,600 | | |
| 12 | 21 March 1993 | Sommersby | ₤3,176,653,200 | | |
| 13 | 28 March 1993 | Sommersby | ₤2,672,060,800 | | |
| 14 | 4 April 1993 | Sommersby | ₤1,802,705,600 | | |
| 15 | 11 April 1993 | Forever Young | ₤1,333,664,000 | | |
| 16 | 18 April 1993 | Forever Young | ₤1,838,601,000 | | |
| 17 | 25 April 1993 | La Scorta | ₤1,552,857,000 | La Scorta reached number one in its second week of release | |
| 18 | 2 May 1993 | La Scorta | ₤1,417,839,990 | | |
| 19 | 9 May 1993 | Indecent Proposal | ₤2,030,438,970 | | |
| 20 | 16 May 1993 | Indecent Proposal | ₤3,039,476,370 | | |
| 21 | 23 May 1993 | Indecent Proposal | ₤1,855,513,380 | | |
| 22 | 30 May 1993 | Falling Down | ₤639,486,750 | Falling Down reached number one in its second week of release | |
| 23 | 10 June 1993 | The Piano | ₤802,035,680 | | |
| 24 | 17 June 1993 | The Piano | ₤747,977,200 | | |
| 25 | 24 June 1993 | The Piano | TBD | | |
| 26 | 1 July 1993 | The Piano | TBD | | |
| 27 | 8 July 1993 | The Piano | ₤281,763,650 | | |
| 28 | 15 July 1993 | The Piano | ₤249,197,600 | | |
| 29 | 22 July 1993 | The Piano | ₤89,767,700 | 4-day weekend only | |
| 30 | 29 July 1993 | The Piano | ₤75,622,400 | Weekend only | |
| 31 | 5 August 1993 | The Piano | TBD | | |
| 32 | 12 August 1993 | The Piano | TBD | | |
| 33 | 19 August 1993 | The Piano | TBD | | |
| 34 | 26 August 1993 | The Piano | TBD | | |
| 35 | 2 September 1993 | The Piano | TBD | Made in America grossed $328,000 | |
| 36 | 9 September 1993 | The Piano | TBD | Hot Shots! Part Deux grossed $657,800 | |
| 37 | 16 September 1993 | The Fugitive | ₤4,002,625,450 | | |
| 38 | 23 September 1993 | Jurassic Park † | ₤5,914,917,800 | Weekend only. Jurassic Park grossed a record $6.1 million nationwide for the weekend and $8.9 million for the week. | |
| 39 | 30 September 1993 | Jurassic Park † | ₤6,164,925,858 | Weekend only | |
| 40 | 7 October 1993 | Jurassic Park † | TBD | | |
| 41 | 14 October 1993 | Jurassic Park † | ₤2,502,219,140 | Weekend only | |
| 42 | 21 October 1993 | Jurassic Park † | ₤1,559,194,560 | Weekend only | |
| 43 | 28 October 1993 | The Firm | ₤1,742,582,000 | Weekend only | |
| 44 | 4 November 1993 | Cliffhanger | ₤2,110,189,320 | Weekend only | |
| 45 | 11 November 1993 | Cliffhanger | ₤1,821,694,860 | Weekend only | |
| 46 | 18 November 1993 | The Man Without a Face | ₤1,126,228,860 | Weekend only. The Man Without a Face reached number one in its second week of release | |
| 47 | 25 November 1993 | Rising Sun | ₤1,391,973,000 | Weekend only. Rising Sun reached number one in its second week of release | |
| 48 | 2 December 1993 | Rising Sun | ₤1,071,044,700 | Weekend only | |
| 49 | 9 December 1993 | Aladdin | ₤2,754,364,400 | Weekend only. Aladdin set an opening record for a Disney film in Italy | |
| 50 | 16 December 1993 | Aladdin | ₤3,245,975,660 | Weekend only | |
| 51 | 23 December 1993 | Aladdin | TBD | | |
| 52 | 30 December 1993 | Son of the Pink Panther | ₤4,059,507,810 | Weekend only | |

== See also ==
- Lists of box office number-one films

| Preceded by 1992 | 1993 |
