= Giulio Base =

Italian film director (born 1964)

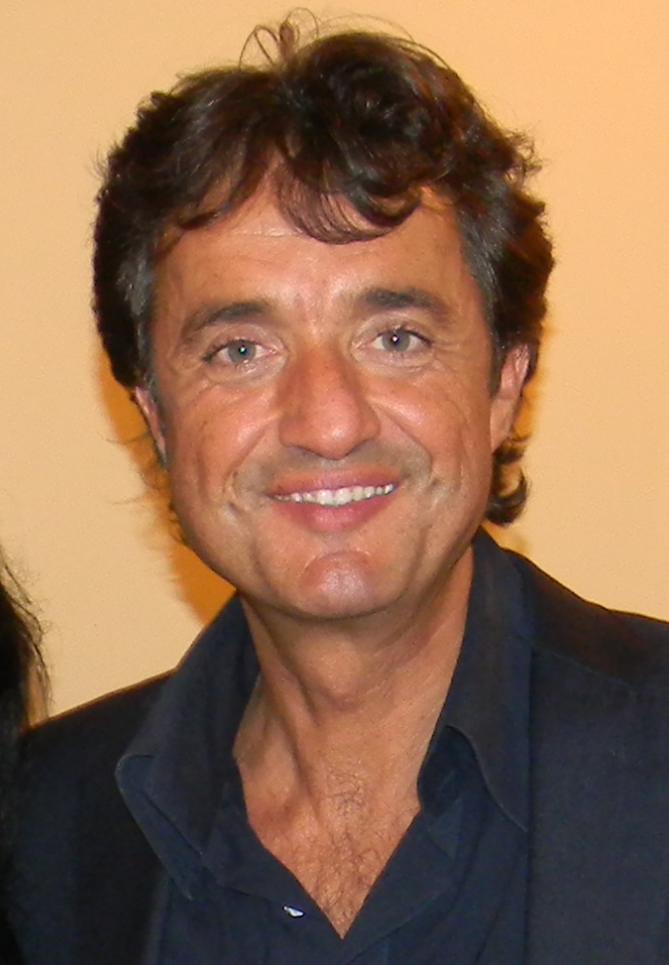
- Born: 6 December 1964 (age 61); Turin, Piedmont, Italy
- Occupations: Film director, screenwriter, film producer, actor

Giulio Base (born 6 December 1964) is an Italian film director. He has received two doctorates, one in Literature and Philosophy and another in Theology, and has been a member of Mensa International since 1996.

== Career ==
Base began his career as an actor, studying in Florence at the School for Dramatic Art under the actor Vittorio Gassman.

After working as an actor, he made his directorial debut with Crack (1991), based on a theatre piece that he had already directed and performed on stage. The movie was shown at the Venice Film Festival in Italy. The film won the best first opera prize at the San Sebastián International Film Festival.

His second film, The East (1992), a road movie, was also shown in Venice and at the Toronto International Film Festival

Base directed Policemen (1996), his first work on a European major film, which was an international co-production including French and Italian actors. This film won a prize as the best movie at the Festival of the Film Policiers in Arcachon, France.

The West (1998) was the sequel to The East, and was a road movie about young boys driving from New York to Los Angeles. It was awarded the Special Jury Award at the Réncontres du Cinema, in Annecy, France.

La Bomba - Once Upon A Time In Little Italy (1999), a comedy about mafia lifestyle in New York City, featured Shelley Winters.

His first role as director of a TV movie was Padre Pio: Between Heaven and Earth (2000).

In 2005, he directed Imperium: Saint Peter, the tale of Peter, the first apostle, played by Omar Sharif. This work introduced him to the Hollywood film industry.

In 2006, he directed The Inquiry (produced by Avi Lerner, with Nu Image) that was released by 20th Century Fox in the United States (as The Final Inquiry), by Sony in Spain, and by IIF in Italy. The cast included actors Max Von Sydow, F. Murray Abraham, Ornella Muti, and Dolph Lundgren.

In 2007, he directed Imperium: Pompeii.

In 2009, he directed a western comedy shot in New Mexico, Doc West, starring Terence Hill, Paul Sorvino and Clare Carey. The movie was shown at the Cannes Film Market.

In 2010, he shot the TV movie A Dog for Two.

In 2011, he directed the film The Sunday Woman, a remake of the 1970s film.

As of 2024, he is the director of the Torino Film Festival.
