= Little Misunderstandings =

- Directed by: Ricky Tognazzi
- Written by: Claudio Bigagli; Simona Izzo; Ruggero Maccari
- Cinematography: Alessio Gelsini Torresi
- Music by: Enzo Jannacci; Paolo Jannacci
- Production company: Massfilm
- Distributed by: United International Pictures
- Release date: 1989
- Country: Italy
- Language: Italian

Piccoli equivoci (internationally released as Little Misunderstandings) is a 1989 Italian comedy film directed by Ricky Tognazzi. It was shown at the 1989 Cannes Film Festival, in the section "Quinzaine des Réalisateurs".

For this film Nancy Brilli won a David di Donatello for Best Supporting Actress and a Silver Ribbon in the same category. The director Ricky Tognazzi was instead awarded with a David di Donatello for Best New Director and a Silver Ribbon in the same category.

== Cast ==
- Sergio Castellitto: Paolo
- Lina Sastri: Francesca
- Roberto Citran: Giuliano
- Nancy Brilli: Sophie
- Nicola Pistoia: Enrico
- Pino Quartullo: Piero
