= Lo zio d'America =

- Genre: Comedy
- Directed by: Rossella Izzo
- Starring: Christian De Sica; Ornella Muti; Eleonora Giorgi; Rosanna Banfi; Karin Proia; Paolo Conticini; Giulia Steigerwalt; Leila Durante; Myriam Catania; Francesco Venditti; Sofia Milos; Mario Maranzana; Monica Scattini; Stefania Barca; Enzo De Caro; Mattia Sbragia; Gino La Monica; Barbara D'Urso; Stefano Benassi; Ray Lovelock; Antonella Ponziani; Lorella Cuccarini; Edoardo Leo; Pino Quartullo; Erika Blanc; Pino Insegno; Enio Drovandi; Roberto Alpi; Francesca Reggiani; Gianni Nazzaro; Riccardo Miniggio; Stefano Masciarelli; Marco Bocci; Ramona Badescu; Matteo Urzia
- Country of origin: Italy
- No. of seasons: 2
- No. of episodes: 12

Original release
- Network: Rai 1
- Release: October 20, 2002 – November 14, 2006

Lo zio d'America is an Italian comedy television series.

== Cast ==
- Christian De Sica: Massimo Ricciardi
- Ornella Muti: Maria Monticelli
- Lorella Cuccarini: Francesca
- Eleonora Giorgi: Beatrice Ricciardi
- Rosanna Banfi: Mercedes Ricciardi
- Karin Proia: Manuela De Crescenzo
- Paolo Conticini: Vanni Ceccarello
- Giulia Steigerwalt: Flaminia De Crescenzo
- Leila Durante: Nené
- Erika Blanc: Giovanna Ricciardi
- Pino Insegno: Alfonso
- Enio Drovandi: Ignazio il portiere
- Roberto Alpi: Federico
- Edoardo Leo: Fabio
- Sofia Milos: Barbara Steele
- Myriam Catania: Claudia
- Mario Maranzana: Svjatoslav
- Monica Scattini: Polissena Vanvitelli
- Stefania Barca: Simona Cavalieri
- Enzo De Caro: Lorenzo Vanvitelli
- Mattia Sbragia: Andrea
- Stefano Benassi: Carlo Gabrieli
- Ray Lovelock: Gianluigi Patrizi
- Pino Ammendola: Jean Pierre
- Pino Quartullo: Domenico

== See also ==
- List of Italian television series
