= The Escort (1993 film) =

1993 film

- A poster bearing the film's Italian title: La scorta
- Directed by: Ricky Tognazzi
- Written by: Graziano Diana; Simona Izzo
- Produced by: Claudio Bonivento
- Starring: Claudio Amendola; Enrico Lo Verso; Carlo Cecchi; Ricky Memphis; Tony Sperandeo; Lorenza Indovina; Ugo Conti; Rita Savagnone; Francesca D'Aloja
- Cinematography: Alessio Gelsini Torresi
- Edited by: Carla Simoncelli
- Music by: Ennio Morricone
- Release date: 15 April 1993
- Running time: 92 minutes
- Country: Italy
- Language: Italian

The Escort (Italian: La scorta) is a 1993 Italian crime film directed by Ricky Tognazzi. It was an entry at the 1993 Cannes Film Festival.

== Plot ==
Sicily, 1990s. Following the killing of the deputy prosecutor Rizzo and the carabinieri marshal Virzì, the magistrate Michele De Francesco arrives in Trapani. His escort consists of Angelo, native of the place, a friend of the slain marshal and determined to do justice; of Andrea, head of the Trapani escort; of Fabio, a Roman who does not accept the risky assignment, and the two drivers, Raffaele and Nicola. Soon the magistrate, investigating the water supply of the city and the construction of a large dam, discovers dangerous collusions between the mafia, politics and law enforcement, in the persons of the M.P. Nestore Bonura, the deputy prefect Scavone and the boss Mazzaria. The decision to close the wells that supply the city causes a scandal to which De Francesco decides to take shelter, giving the men of the escort powers and prerogatives that effectively deprive the staff of the Prosecutor's Office, of which the ambiguous Polizzi seems the probable mole. After initial disagreements between Angelo and Andrea, an increasingly intense friendship arises between the men in the escort, in the midst of a daily odyssey made up of exhausting telephone checks, risky car journeys, threats. The judge's daughter, who arrived in Trapani to celebrate her birthday with her father, miraculously escapes a bomb attack on the car in which she had to travel. Thus dies the driver Raffaele. The pursuit of the investigation also leads to the killing, by the Cosa Nostra, of Bonura, now gripped by overwhelming evidence, despite the silence of a colleague and friend of De Francesco, judge Barresi of Caltanissetta. Worthless is the anger of the escort men who, now in tune with the magistrate, decide, despite everything, to stay by his side, including Fabio who would even give up the long waited transfer. However, an order of the judiciary transfers the judge accusing him of having used the escort beyond his specific duties, of having disturbed public order and offended the prestige of the Prosecutor's staff. Forced by the events De Francesco embarks for the mainland greeted by the men of his escort who have never betrayed him.

== Cast ==
- Claudio Amendola - Angelo Mandolesi
- Enrico Lo Verso - Andrea Corsale
- Carlo Cecchi - Assistant Prosecuting Magistrate Michele De Francesco
- Ricky Memphis - Fabio Muzzi
- Tony Sperandeo - Raffaele Frasca
- Lorenza Indovina - Lia Corsale
- Ugo Conti - Nicola
- Rita Savagnone - Angelo's Mother
- Giovanni Alamia - Nino Carabba
- Francesca D'Aloja - Anna Spano
- Giovanni Pallavicino - Padre Virzi
- Giacinto Ferro - M.P. Nestore Bonura
- Guia Jelo - Rosalia Carabba
- Benedetto Raneli - President Caruso
- Francesco Siciliano - Policeman Marchetti
- Angelo Infanti - Judging Magistrate Barresi

== Reception ==
It spent two weeks at the top of the Italian box office grossing $1.3 million in its first week and $1.9 million after 10 days from 84 screens.

== Year-end lists ==
- Honorable mention – David Elliott, The San Diego Union-Tribune
