= Il branco =

- Directed by: Marco Risi
- Starring: Ricky Memphis; Luca Zingaretti
- Cinematography: Massimo Pau
- Music by: Franco Piersanti
- Release date: 1994
- Language: Italian

Il branco is a 1994 Italian drama film directed by Marco Risi. The film, which is inspired by a 1983 rape case, entered the competition at the 51st Venice International Film Festival.

== Cast ==
- Giampiero Lisarelli: Raniero
- Luca Zingaretti: Ottorino
- Ricky Memphis: Pallesecche
- Giorgio Tirabassi: Sola
- Natale Tulli: Sor Quinto
- Tamara Simunovic: Sylvia
- Angelika Krautzberger: Marion
