= Questa è la mia terra =

- Country of origin: Italy
- Original language: Italian
- No. of seasons: 2
- No. of episodes: 14

Original release
- Network: Canale 5
- Release: 2006 – 2008

Questa è la mia terra is an Italian television series. The second season title was Questa è la mia terra - Vent'anni dopo.

== Cast ==
- Kasia Smutniak: Giulia Corradi
- Roberto Farnesi: Andrea Acciari
- Massimo Poggio: Giacomo De Santis
- Massimo Ciavarro: Giuseppe Aiello
- Cristina Moglia: Bianca Corradi
- Myriam Catania: Silvana Corradi

== See also ==
- List of Italian television series
