= We'll Really Hurt You =

1998 Italian film by Pino Quartullo

- Directed by: Pino Quartullo
- Written by: Pino Quartullo; Claudio Masenza
- Produced by: Fulvio Lucisano
- Starring: Pino Quartullo; Ricky Memphis; Stefania Sandrelli
- Cinematography: Kika Ungaro
- Music by: Pivio and Aldo De Scalzi
- Release date: 1998
- Country: Italy
- Language: Italian

We'll Really Hurt You (Italian: Le faremo tanto male) is a 1998 Italian comedy film written and directed by Pino Quartullo. stars Pino Quartullo, Ricky Memphis, Stefania Sandrelli.

== Cast ==
- Pino Quartullo as Marco
- Ricky Memphis as Ruggero
- Stefania Sandrelli as Federica Birki
- Anna Valle as Monica
- Nathalie Caldonazzo as Cinzia
- Venantino Venantini as Pietro
- Rocco Barbaro as Alvise Mantovani
- Caterina Guzzanti as Verde
- Filippo Corlini as Miro
- Michele Cucuzza as himself
