= The Good Pope: Pope John XXIII =

2003 film by Ricky Tognazzi

- Written by: Fabrizio Bettelli; Ricky Tognazzi; Simona Izzo; Marco Roncalli
- Directed by: Ricky Tognazzi
- Starring: Bob Hoskins
- Composer: Ennio Morricone
- Country of origin: Italy
- Original language: Italian

Production
- Producer: Massimo Ferrero
- Cinematography: Giovanni Canevari
- Editor: Carla Simoncelli
- Running time: 180 min.

Original release
- Network: Canale 5
- Release: 28 January 2003

The Good Pope: Pope John XXIII (Italian: Il Papa Buono, also known with the shorten titles The Good Pope and The Good Pope: John XXIII) is a 2003 Italian television film written and directed by Ricky Tognazzi. The film is based on real life events of Pope John XXIII.

== Plot ==
In this film about the life of Pope John XXIII Bob Hoskins stars as, Pope John XXIII, a man of humble origin who became one of the most influential Popes of the last century. Born Angelo Roncalli, in Sotto Il Monte in 1881, he was known for his profound spirituality as well as his extraordinary goodness from a young age. He was a farmer's son who influenced the world politics of the time; a man of modest character who revolutionised the church.

After the death of Pope Pius XII many Curia cardinals thought that Roncalli would be transitional pope. Nevertheless he was pope during a most extraordinary chapter in history: the Cold War, the Berlin Wall and early space travel (Yuri Gagarin as the first such traveler in 1961). At the time of the Cuba crisis he influenced world politicians to keep the peace. He took the extraordinary step of announcing the Second Vatican Council, because he thought the time ripe for renewal in the Church. In his short time as pope, John XXIII touched the hearts of every creed and color. He visited prisoners and people who were very sick. He was christened by the people as the 'good pope'. This story follows scenes of his life and events he participated to. It will help us understand why thousands flocked to Rome to join Pope John XXIII in his final hours and why millions around the world mourned his death.

== Cast ==
- Bob Hoskins as Angelo Giuseppe Roncalli
- Carlo Cecchi as Cardinal Mattia Carcano
- Roberto Citran as Loris Capovilla
- Fabrizio Vidale as young Angelo Roncalli
- Chiara Caselli as Carla
- Arnoldo Foà as Card. Alfredo Ottaviani
- Ricky Tognazzi as Mons. Giacomo Radini-Tedeschi
- Ivo Garrani as Cardinal Carcano (Mattia Carcano's Uncle)
- Erland Josephson as Franz von Papen
- Sergio Bustric as Guido Gusso
- Francesco Venditti as Young Nicola Catania
- John Light as Young Mattia Carcano
- Rolando Ravello as Cannava
- Francesco Carnelutti as Old Nicola Catania
- Lena Lessing as Marta Von Papen
- Enzo Robutti as Angelo's Grandfather
