= Ultra (film) =

1991 film

- DVD cover
- Directed by: Ricky Tognazzi
- Written by: Graziano Diana; Simona Izzo; Giuseppe Manfridi; Ricky Tognazzi
- Produced by: Claudio Bonivento
- Starring: Claudio Amendola
- Cinematography: Alessio Gelsini Torresi
- Edited by: Carla Simoncelli
- Music by: Antonello Venditti
- Release date: 1 March 1991
- Running time: 95 minutes
- Country: Italy
- Language: Italian

Ultra (Italian: Ultrà) is a 1991 Italian drama film directed by Ricky Tognazzi. It was entered into the 41st Berlin International Film Festival, where Tognazzi won the Silver Bear for Best Director.

== Plot ==
A group of ultras of AS Roma leaves to Turin, Italy, where the guys have to play the game of Juventus FC–AS Roma. The Romans are greeted with stones by enemies, and the leader of the extremist group: Er Prince, orders his followers to stab the fans of Juventus. The two opposing factions are arrested and are forced to tell the facts to the superintendent. Meanwhile, in the stadium of Juventus, the remaining ultras are locked in a brawl between their enemies with exaggerated stabbings and stones.

== Cast ==
- Claudio Amendola as Principe
- Ricky Memphis as Red
- Gianmarco Tognazzi as Ciafretta
- Giuppy Izzo as Cinzia
- Alessandro Tiberi as Fabietto
- Fabrizio Vidale as Smilzo
- Krum De Nicola as Morfino
- Antonello Morroni as Teschio
- Michele Camparino as Nerone
- Fabrizio Franceschi as Nazi
- Fabio Buttinelli as Mandrake
- Fabio Maraschi as Cobra
- Alessandro Amen as Ketchup
- Claudio Del Falco as Capo Drugo
- Bruno Del Turco as Patata

== See also ==
- List of association football films
