= I delitti del cuoco =

- Genre: Black comedy; Crime; Satire
- Starring: Bud Spencer; Enrico Silvestrin; Monica Scattini; Monica Dugo; Lucia Ragni; Giovanni Esposito; Eleonora Sergio; Yari Gugliucci; Pietro Traldi; Andréa Ferréol; Sascha Zacharias; Walter Lippa; Gigi Savoia; Sergio Solli
- Country of origin: Italy
- No. of seasons: 1
- No. of episodes: 11

Production
- Running time: 60 min (episode)

Original release
- Network: Canale 5
- Release: 9 May – 6 June 2010

I delitti del cuoco (English: The Chef's Crimes) is an Italian crime-comedy television series starring Bud Spencer, directed by Alessandro Capone, shot in Ischia and freely inspired by the Nero Wolfe character from the eponymous US 1981 TV series (itself adapted from novels and stories by Rex Stout). Produced by Spencer's son Giuseppe Pedersoli's Smile Productions company, the series ran for only one season in 2010 on Canale 5.

== Plot ==
Carlo Banci (played by Spencer), anagraphically known as Rosario, is a former police constable in Ischia. Once retired, he decides to open a restaurant. In his new venture, Carlo is partnered with three "acquaintances" of his, who he got jailed in the past: poison murderer Castagna, forger Margherita and robber Antonio. The grumpy but golden-hearted chef, who never lost his passion for justice and for upholding weak people's rights, collaborates indirectly to investigations of criminal cases led by his policeman adopted son Francesco.

Soon, the company's routine is upset by the arrival of Elsie, a young woman who pretends she is a nun but is later revealed as an international thief and Carlo's daughter - born out of a relationship with an old crush of his in Germany, a thief as well. Elsie is forced to interrupt her thieving "activity" as she is controlled by her father; in the meantime, having realized she is a good cook, she becomes sous-chef in the restaurant and falls in love with Francesco, who is already engaged to fellow law enforcer Serenella. However, his romance with Elsie ends up as truer and more deeply felt.

== Historical inaccuracy ==
The third episode in the series includes a deliberate historical inaccuracy. It is stated that Gabriele D'Annunzio was killed by two lovers of his, who pushed him down a third-floor balcony. D'Annunzio actually died of intracerebral hemorrhage; however, the incident actually happened, but instead of killing the writer, it resulted in a long agony which he recovered from after several days.

== Cast ==
- Bud Spencer: Carlo Banci
- Enrico Silvestrin: Francesco Fattori
- Monica Scattini: Castagna
- Monica Dugo: Margherita
- Lucia Ragni: Suor Croce
- Giovanni Esposito: Antonio
- Eleonora Sergio: Serenella
- Andrea Ferreol: Gertrude Heine
- Sascha Zacharias: Elsie Keller
- Gigi Savoia: Michele Apicella
- Sergio Solli: Gaetano Morabito

== See also ==
- List of Italian television series
