= Stefano Masciarelli =

Italian actor and comedian

- Born: 14 February 1958 (age 68); Rome, Italy
- Occupations: Actor; Comedian

Stefano Masciarelli (born 14 February 1958) is an Italian actor and comedian, whose career spanned about 40 years.

== Life and career ==
Born in Rome, after getting a degree in electronics, Masciarelli worked as a lifeguard and, for seven years, as a private investigator. After studying voice acting with Gigi Reder, he made his television debut impersonating Gianni Agnelli in the 1987 variety show Quel fantastico tragico venerdì. He became first known in 1988, thanks to the comic caricature of a FIAT worker in the comedy show La TV delle ragazze, and in the early 1990s, he participated in the popular sketch comedy shows Avanzi and Tunnel, and co-hosted the 1994-95 season of Domenica in.

Masciarelli has had an intense acting career, appearing on stage, in films, and in TV series. Also active as a voice actor and a dubber, he voiced Crush in the Italian versions of Finding Nemo and Finding Dory.

== Selected filmography ==
- A Bear Named Arthur, directed by Sergio Martino (1992)
- Mille bolle blu, directed by Leone Pompucci (1993)
- Cemetery Man, directed by Michele Soavi (1994)
- Simpatici & antipatici, directed by Christian De Sica (1998)
- Fantozzi 2000 - La clonazione, directed by Domenico Saverni (1999)
- Se lo fai sono guai, directed by Michele Massimo Tarantini (2001)
- Sympathy for the Lobster, directed by Sabina Guzzanti (2007)
- Torno indietro e cambio vita, directed by Carlo Vanzina (2015)
