= Ho sposato uno sbirro =

Italian television series

Ho Sposato Uno Sbirro (Cop Marriage) is an Italian police detective series, which ran from 2008 to 2010 on Rai 1. It stars Flavio Insinna as police commissioner Diego Santamaria.

It never aired in the U.S.

== Plot ==
The show mostly revolves around murders and the police inspectors, but also deals with Diego's personal family life. Stella, who not only is one of Diego's inspectors, but is his wife as well, is played by German-born actress Christiane Filangieri. Other characters include Diego's mother, Herminia, is played by actress Giovanna Ralli, and Stella's mother, Clarissa, played by Barbara Bouchet. During the first season, 6 episodes have been filmed. In the pilot episode, Diego and Stella meet, fall in love, and get married. In the third episode, Stella thinks she's pregnant, and Diego goes into panic mode. And in the season finale, Stella leaves Diego after catching him having an affair with his ex-girlfriend. This is a very crucial episode. Stella gets hit by a car, ends up in a coma, and Diego's by her bedside, begging her to wake up. When she finally regains consciousness, she forgives him and tells him some shocking news.

In September 2010, the second season of "Ho Sposato Uno Sbirro" premiered on RaiUno in Italy, and on its international channel, RaiItalia, a month later, in other parts of the world. Even though, it was filmed almost 3 years ago, the story where Season 1 ended, picks up at the beginning of Season 2. Stella's about ready to give birth to her and Diego's first child, and they're trying to get to the hospital. Later, Diego's surprised to find out he's the father of twin girls. Diego's very supportive of taking care of the babies, as long as he's not working. In the fourth episode, "Una Piccola Sorpresa", Diego and his inspector receive a hot tip about the hideout of a murder suspect. Instead of finding him, they find his young son, Nikola, hiding in the closet. Diego convinces Nikola to come with him to the police station, where he takes a liking to Lorenza, (played by Luisa Corna) the police psychologist and Diego's ex-wife. The most poignant scene in this episode is when Nikola's told that his father has been arrested and will be in jail for a long time. Diego, Stella, and Lorenza take Nikola to a home for foster kids, where Diego and Nikola have a very emotional goodbye.

== Cast ==
- Flavio Insinna as Diego Santamaria
- Christiane Filangieri as Stella Morini
- Luisa Corna as Lorenza Alfieri
- Antonio Catania as Giuseppe Lojacono
- Barbara Bouchet as Clarissa Morini
- Giovanna Ralli as Herminia Santamaria
- Paolo Buglioni as Ramazza
- Marco Bocci as Simone Ardea
- Giulietta Revel as Rosa Liguori
- Serena Rossi as Barbara Castello
- Francesco Arca as Antonio Branca
- Luca Calvani as Giovanni Vattoli
- Daniel Emilio Baldock as Ernest

== See also ==
- List of Italian television series
