= Excellent Cadavers (film) =

1999 film

- Directed by: Ricky Tognazzi
- Written by: Peter Pruce
- Based on: Excellent Cadavers (1995) by Alexander Stille
- Produced by: Renato Izzo; David Nichols
- Starring: Chazz Palminteri
- Cinematography: Alessio Gelsini Torresi
- Edited by: Roberto Silvi
- Music by: Michael Tavera
- Distributed by: HBO Pictures
- Release date: October 16, 1999
- Running time: 86 minutes
- Countries: Italy; United States
- Language: English
- Budget: $1,500,000

Excellent Cadavers (Italian: I giudici, and also known as "Falcone") is a 1999 television film directed by Ricky Tognazzi.

The film is based on the book with the same name by Alexander Stille and tells the real life events of judge Giovanni Falcone. It was filmed in Palermo and Rome.

The TV movie was broadcast by HBO October 16, 1999.

== Plot ==
In 1978, Judge Giovanni Falcone, while in Favignana attending a mattanza, learns that he has been transferred from the court of Trapani to that of Palermo. There, the investigating judge Gaetano Costa, a friend of Falcone, is assassinated just two months before retirement. After the death of his colleague, Falcone is assigned a bodyguard, Mario Fabbri. In 1984, he interrogates Tommaso Buscetta.

Falcone would then have to fight, alongside his friend and colleague Paolo Borsellino, against Totò Riina and Cosa Nostra, but also against the growing hostility directed at him—even from other magistrates. Both Sicilian judges would lose their lives in two separate attacks, both in 1992.

== Cast ==
- Chazz Palminteri as Giovanni Falcone
- F. Murray Abraham as Tommaso Buscetta
- Tony Sperandeo as Stefano Bontate
- Anna Galiena as Francesca Morvillo
- Andy Luotto as Paolo Borsellino
- Lina Sastri as Agnese Borsellino
- Arnoldo Foà as Judge Antonino Caponnetto
- Ivo Garrani as Judge Gaetano Costa
- Gianmarco Tognazzi as Antonino Cassarà
- Pierfrancesco Favino as Mario Fabbri
- Mattia Sbragia as Judge Quinzi
- Francesco Benigno as Giuseppe Greco
- Mario Erpichini as Judge Rocco Chinnici
- Paolo Paoloni as Salvo Lima
- Victor Cavallo as Totò Riina
- Giuseppe Cederna as Judge Giuseppe Ayala
- Stefano Benassi as Inspector
- Bruno Bilotta as Salvatore Inzerillo
- Luigi Maria Burruano as Luciano Liggio
- Monica Scattini as Francesca's Colleague
- Andrea Tidona as Mayor
- Riccardo Salvino as Magistrate
- Ricky Tognazzi as Prison Director
