= Simona Izzo =

Italian film director (born 1953)

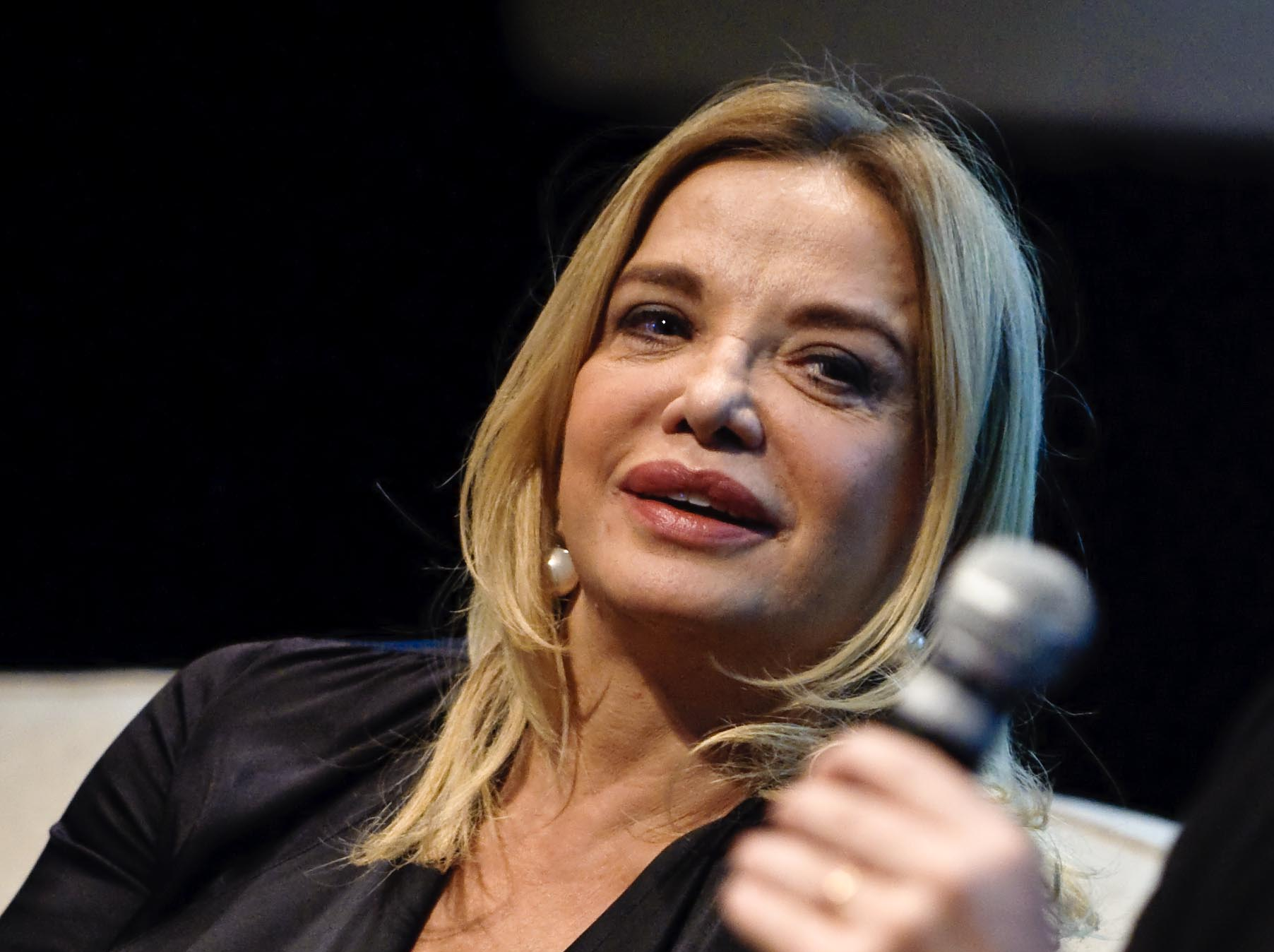
- Izzo in 2012
- Born: Simonetta Izzo; 22 April 1953 (age 72); Rome, Italy
- Occupations: Actress; voice actress; screenwriter; film director; author
- Years active: 1973–present
- Spouses: Antonello Venditti (m. 1975; div. 1978) Ricky Tognazzi (m. 1995)
- Children: Francesco Venditti
- Parents: Renato Izzo (father); Liliana D'Amico (mother)
- Relatives: Rossella Izzo (twin sister); Fiamma Izzo (sister); Giuppy Izzo (sister); Myriam Catania (niece)

Simonetta "Simona" Izzo (born 22 April 1953) is an Italian actress, voice actress, film director and screenwriter.

== Biography ==
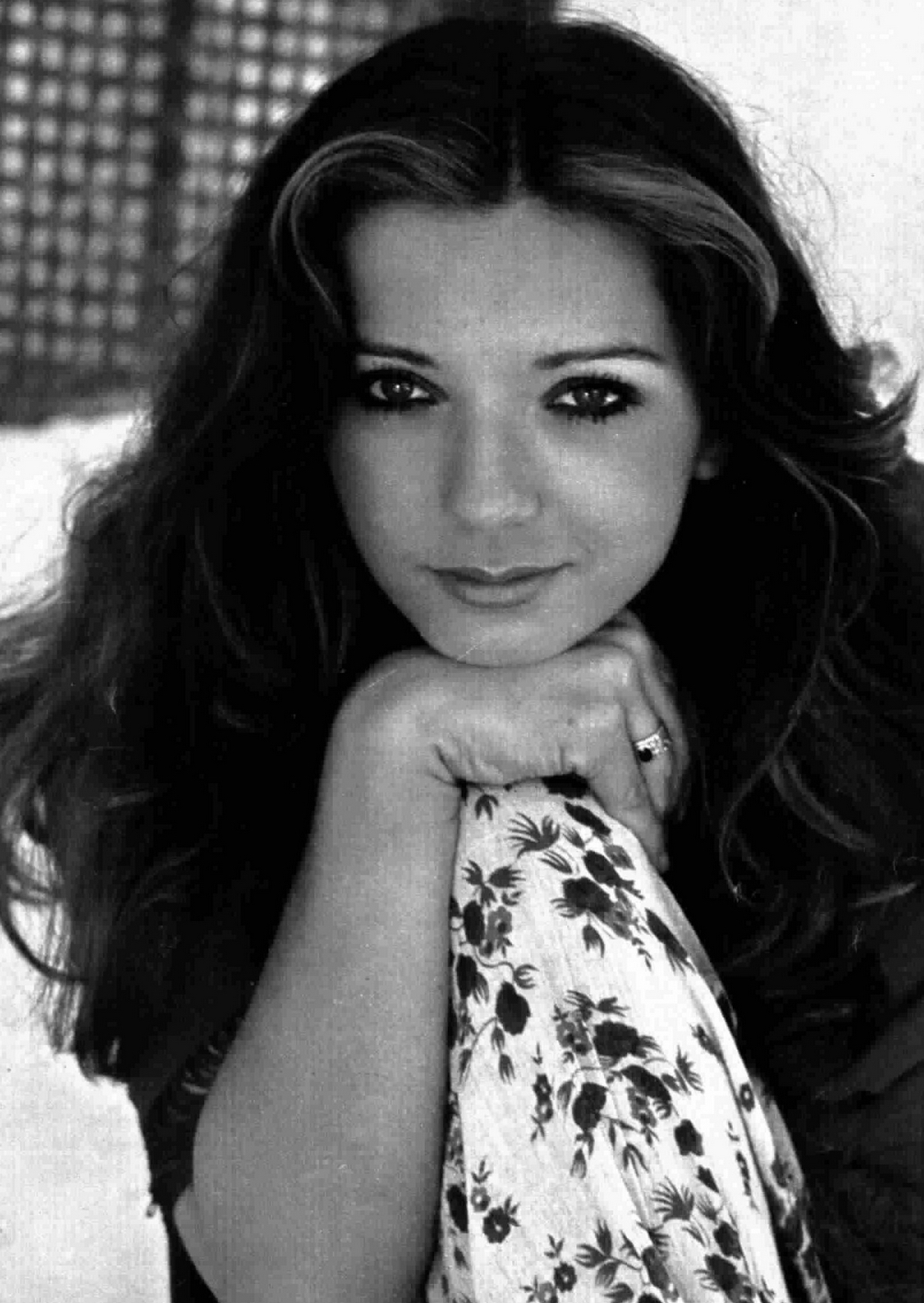
Izzo in 1975

Born in Rome, the daughter of voice actor Renato Izzo, Simona Izzo began working as a dubber at a young age. In 1990, she won the Nastro d'Argento for Best Dubbing for her work on the Italian version of Scenes from the Class Struggle in Beverly Hills, where she dubbed Jacqueline Bisset. After appearing as an actress in a number of TV series and films and collaborating to a number of screenplays written by her husband, Ricky Tognazzi, her directorial debut, Sentimental Maniacs earned her the David di Donatello for Best New Director.

=== Personal life ===
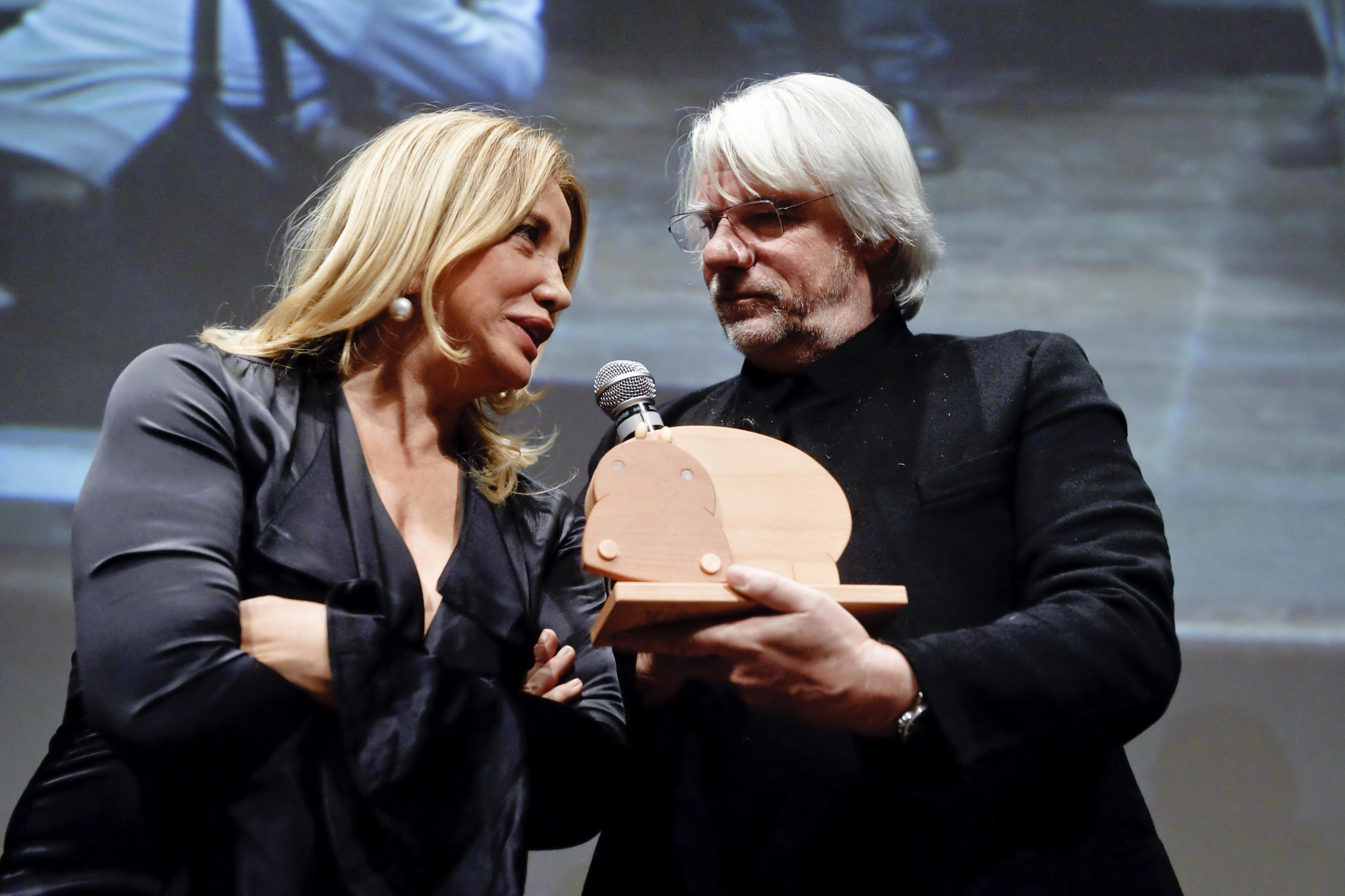
Izzo with Ricky Tognazzi

From her marriage to singer-songwriter Antonello Venditti (1975–1978), Simona Izzo has a son, Francesco. Since 1995, she has been married to director Ricky Tognazzi. She is an atheist.

== Selected television ==
Co-hosted for RAI, and ultimately, Eurovision, the 1982 Italian heat of Jeux sans frontières on Tuesday 25 May at La Maddalena, Italy.

== Selected filmography ==
Screenwriter

- Little Misunderstandings (1989)
- Ultra (1991)
- The Escort (1993)
- Strangled Lives (1996)
- Canone inverso (2000)
- The Good Pope: Pope John XXIII (2003)

Screenwriter and director

- Sentimental Maniacs (1994)
- Bedrooms (1997)
