= Una donna per amico (TV series) =

- Genre: Medical drama
- Created by: Carmela Cicinnati; Peter Exacoustos
- Starring: Elisabetta Gardini; Enzo Decaro; Francesca Messere; Pietro Mannino
- Country of origin: Italy
- Original language: Italian
- No. of seasons: 3
- No. of episodes: 29

Production
- Executive producer: Daniela Valentini
- Running time: 100 minutes
- Production company: RAI

Original release
- Network: Rai 1
- Release: September 27, 1998 – April 16, 2001

Una donna per amico is an Italian television series, which ran on Rai 1 for three seasons from September 27, 1998 to April 16, 2001. The series revolves around a group of doctors and nurses in the obstetrics and gynaecology department of a Roman hospital.

== Plot ==
Laura Andrei and Piero La Torre, both gynecologists in a hospital in Rome, have been married for years and have two children, Francesca and Dado. The couple begins to go through a period of crisis following the appointment of Laura to primary aid at the expense of Piero, who, frustrated and neglected by his wife, weaves an affair with Rita Lanceri Kraus, a pharmaceutical rep who has already had a relationship with Piero's dearest friend, the anesthesiologist Stefano Morandi.

In the department of Gynecology and Obstetrics where Piero and Laura work there are other doctors and nurses, always under the watchful eyes of primary Luigi Conti: there are Sister Mary, an African midwife, the nurses Debora, Gina, Anna, and Caterina, the pediatrician and neonatologist Luca Liberati, the trainees Paoletta Malindri and Sandro Tonini, the primary aid Gianclaudio Russo, and the fellow Paride.

== Series overview ==
Series	Episodes	Originally aired	
Series	Episodes	Series premiere	Series finale
1	8	27 September 1998	9 November 1998
2	8	7 April 2000	29 May 2000
3	13	2 February 2001	16 April 2001
