= Ricky Tognazzi =

Italian actor and director (born 1955)

Ricky Tognazzi in 2010
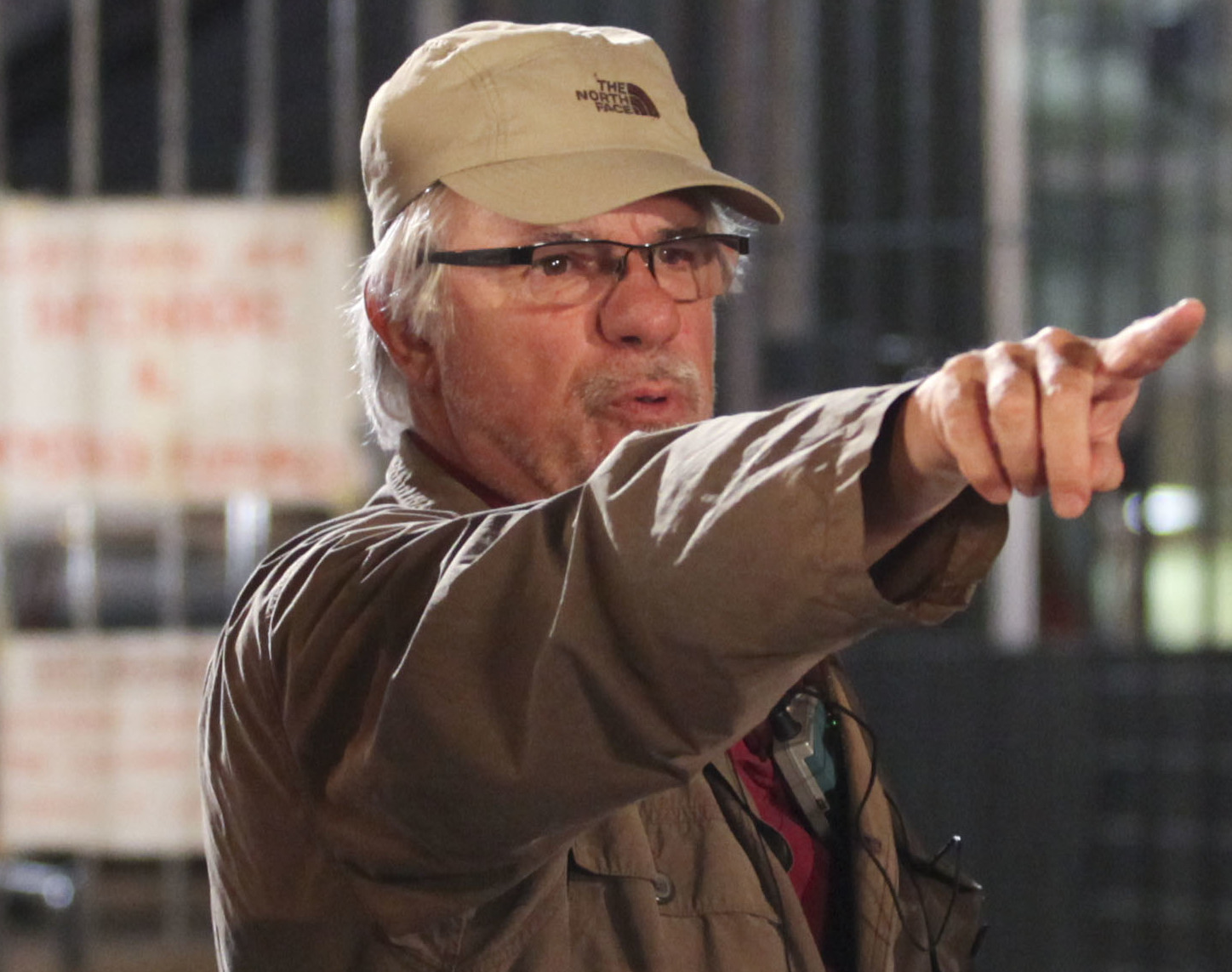
- Tognazzi on set
- Born: Riccardo Tognazzi; 1 May 1955 (age 71); Milan, Italy
- Occupations: Actor, film director
- Years active: 1963–present
- Spouse: Simona Izzo (m. 1995)
- Parents: Ugo Tognazzi (father); Pat O'Hara (mother)
- Relatives: Gianmarco Tognazzi (half-brother); Maria Sole Tognazzi (half-sister); Thomas Robsahm (half-brother)

Riccardo "Ricky" Tognazzi (Italian pronunciation: [ˈriːki toɲˈɲattsi] born 1 May 1955) is an Italian actor and film director. He has appeared in 50 films and television shows since 1963. His film The Escort was entered into the 1993 Cannes Film Festival.

In 1991, he won the Silver Bear for Best Director at the 41st Berlin International Film Festival for his film Ultra. Five years later, his film Strangled Lives won the Alfred Bauer Prize at the 46th Berlin International Film Festival.

He is the son of film actor and director Ugo Tognazzi and the half-brother of actor Gianmarco Tognazzi and film director Maria Sole Tognazzi. In 2016, he appeared as an out-of touch variety show host in the music video for "Tutti Frutti" by English rock band New Order.

He is an outspoken atheist, even if he admires some religious figures such as Saint Thomas, Pope John XXIII and Pope Francis.

== Selected filmography ==
=== Director ===
- Little Misunderstandings (1989)
- Ultra (1991)
- The Escort (1993)
- Strangled Lives (1996)
- Excellent Cadavers (1999)
- Canone inverso - Making Love (2000)
- The Good Pope: Pope John XXIII (2003)
- The Father and the Foreigner (2010)

=== Actor ===
- I mostri (1963)
- Tragedy of a Ridiculous Man (1981)
- Petomaniac (1983)
- Aurora (1984)
- Colpo di fulmine (1985)
- I pompieri (1985)
- Fatto su misura (1985)
- The Family (1987)
- Caruso Pascoski, Son of a Pole (1988)
- Time to Kill (1989)
- A Season of Giants (1990)
- A Simple Story (1991)
- Sentimental Maniacs (1994)
- An Ordinary Hero (1995)
- Il cielo in una stanza (1999)
- Thomas (2001)
- The Best Day of My Life (2002)
- The Good Pope: Pope John XXIII (2003)
- In questo mondo di ladri (2004)
- Nine (2009)
- See You Tomorrow (2013)
