= Rules For a Film about Anabaptists =

Rules for a Film About Anabaptists
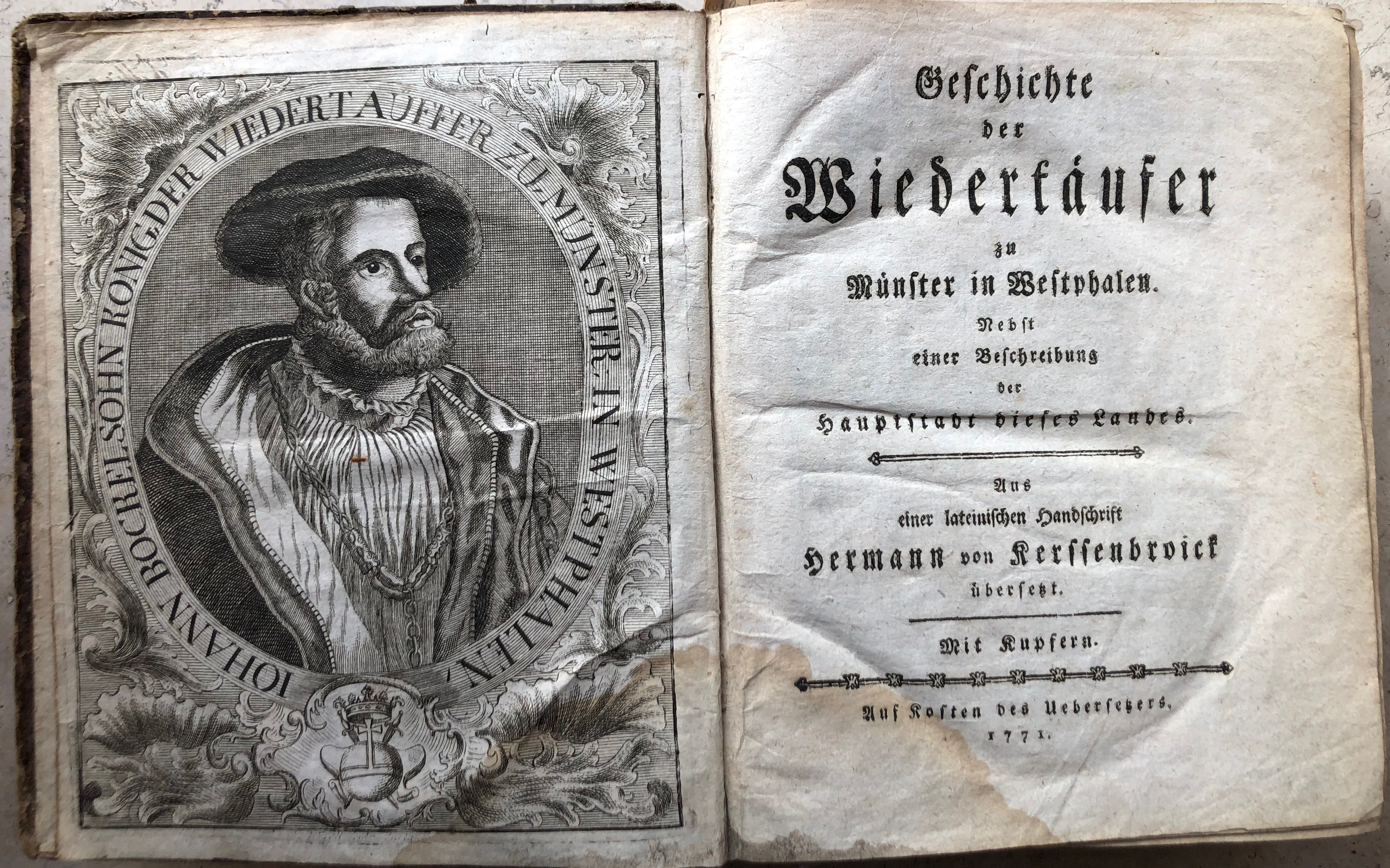
- Opening frame of the film
- Directed by: Georg Brintrup
- Written by: Georg Brintrup; Rudolf Bergmann
- Produced by: La Bottega Cinematografica, Rome; Brintrup Filmproduktion
- Starring: Michael Romat; Wilfried Gronau; Christoph Busch; Tim Sodmann; Petra Gnade; Monika Ernst; Magdalena Storm; Bruno Finke; Ulrike Poerschke
- Cinematography: Ali Reza Movahed
- Edited by: Carlo Carlotto; Georg Brintrup
- Music by: Martin Luther; Arnold Schoenberg
- Release date: 15 November 1976 (Italy)
- Running time: 70 min
- Countries: Germany; Italy
- Language: German

Rules for a Film About Anabaptists (German title: Spielregel für einen Wiedertäuferfilm, lit. 'Playing rule for an Anabaptist film') is a 1976 German–Italian film essay by filmmaker Georg Brintrup. The film compares the policy of the Anabaptists of Münster (1534) with the situation in the Federal Republic of Germany in the mid-1970s, when a so-called "Radicals Decree" (Radikalenerlass, colloquially Berufsverbot) was put into law, aiming to prevent the employment of so-called enemies of the constitution as civil servants.

== Plot ==
Part One – A brief commentary on the events in the city of Münster in the early 1500s regarding the formation of the Anabaptist congregation and its obliteration by the bishop is followed by readings from the introduction to "The History of The Anabaptists" by Hermann von Kerssenbroch. This is a written account which Kerssenbroich, an eye-witness to the disturbances in Münster, wrote in Latin, and which was translated into German anonymously in the 18th century. The text describes the origin of the city of Münster, its buildings, markets, streets, as well as the distribution of the inhabitants, classes, professions and, finally, its constitution. At first, views of the streets and squares in their current form are shown, and then, we see the speaker sitting on a rooftop in Rome, in front of the Vatican Walls. The first part of the film closes with a camera movement from the rooftops of Münster to the Prinzipalmarkt, the center of the city. A fire can be seen while Kerssenbroich relates the portents which foretold the Westphalian turbulences and city destruction.

Part Two – The second part of the film takes place in the streets and squares of the city of Münster. Two young women affected by Berufsverbot (the employment restrictions) on civil servants are shown discussing their individual experiences. One of the women, Monika, explains her case in full, while the other, Magdalena, adds noteworthy details of her own. The case of Bruno Finke is then presented and, during his commentary, Ulrike, another victim, adds details from similar charges against her. Each of these four people is an accredited teacher and a member of the legalized Communist Party of the Federal Republic, the DKP (Deutsche Kommunistische Partei). At the conclusion of this part of the film, the cathedral's astronomical clock is shown. This is the clock constructed in 1542 as a symbol of restoration after the bishop's defeat of the Anabaptists.

== Cast ==
- Michael Romat – Lector
- Wilfried Gronau – Hermann von Kerssenbroch
- Monika Ernst – herself
- Magdalena Storm – herself
- Bruno Finke – himself
- Ulrike Poerschke – herself

== Production ==
Rules for a Film About Anabaptists was first shown at the 1977 International Film Festival Rotterdam. It was also screened at the 1977 Berlin International Film Festival and at the 13th "Mostra Internazionale del Nuovo Cinema" in Pesaro (Italy).
