= Fortunato Santini =

Italian priest, composer and music collector

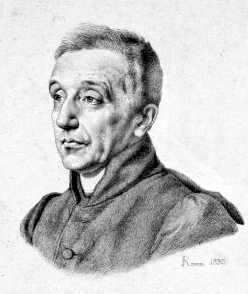
Fortunato Santini in 1823

Fortunato Santini (Rome, 5 January 1777 – Rome, 14 September 1861) was an Italian priest, composer and music collector.

== Life ==
Santini was born in Rome and raised in an orphanage, where he studied counterpoint with Giuseppe Jannacconi. Later on he took organ lessons with G. Giudi. Between 1798 and 1801 he studied theology and philosophy and was ordained a priest in 1801. In those years he already started to copy and collect music manuscripts of the Roman School. He believed that he would only fully understand these old scores if he were able to copy them. Even in the 19th century it was not easy to understand the complicated handwritten scores of the 16th century. These first copies he made, set up the base for his collection which soon became more and more important. To copy musical compositions, Santini went to look for the originals in the different libraries and archives of Rome's churches and monasteries. Thanks to cardinal Carlo Odescalchi, who quartered Santini's collection in his private palace in Rome, Santini had access to private archives held by the Roman nobility, like the Ruspoli family.

In 1820 Santini published a catalog of about a thousand musical scores in his growing collection. This catalog was soon recognized throughout Europe and Santini established contacts with an international range of musicologists, musicians and collectors: Karl Proske, Raphael Georg Kiesewetter, Carl von Winterfeld, Carl Friedrich Zelter and Felix Mendelssohn Bartholdy.

In 1835, through cardinal Odescalchi, Santini became a member of the Congregazione e Accademia di Santa Cecilia; in 1837 of the Sing-Akademie zu Berlin, in 1845 of the Mozarteum in Salzburg and in 1840 of the French Comité historique des arts et monuments du Ministére de l'Instruction Publique.

When in 1838 cardinal Odescalchi decided to give up his title of Cardinal to become a simple member of the Jesuits, Santini moved with his library to an apartment close to the church of Santa Maria dell'Anima, the national church of the whole Holy Roman Empire in Rome and henceforth the national church of Germany and hospice of German-speaking people in Rome. There, Santini started to organize weekly private music soirées where pieces from his precious collection were executed. Mainly vocal sacred music in German by Bach, Händel and Graun who were mostly unknown in Italy in those days. To make German texts more comprehensible he translated them into Italian or into latin.

Between 1830 and 1840 Santini's economic condition became difficult and he considered for the first time selling his collection which then numbered 4.500 handwritten and 1.200 printed scores. All important libraries in Europe, Berlin, Paris, Brussels and Saint Petersburg were interested. But only in 1855, did Santini convey it to the Roman Catholic Diocese of Münster. The exact amount paid is something of a mystery. The only thing certain is that Santini received, in addition to the amount of the sale, an annuity of 465 scudi paid quarterly. At first, the music collection was deposited in rooms at the Campo Santo Teutonico, the German cemetery in Rome. Only a year after Santini's death on 14 September 1861, was his library transported, piece by piece, by donkey cart to Münster.

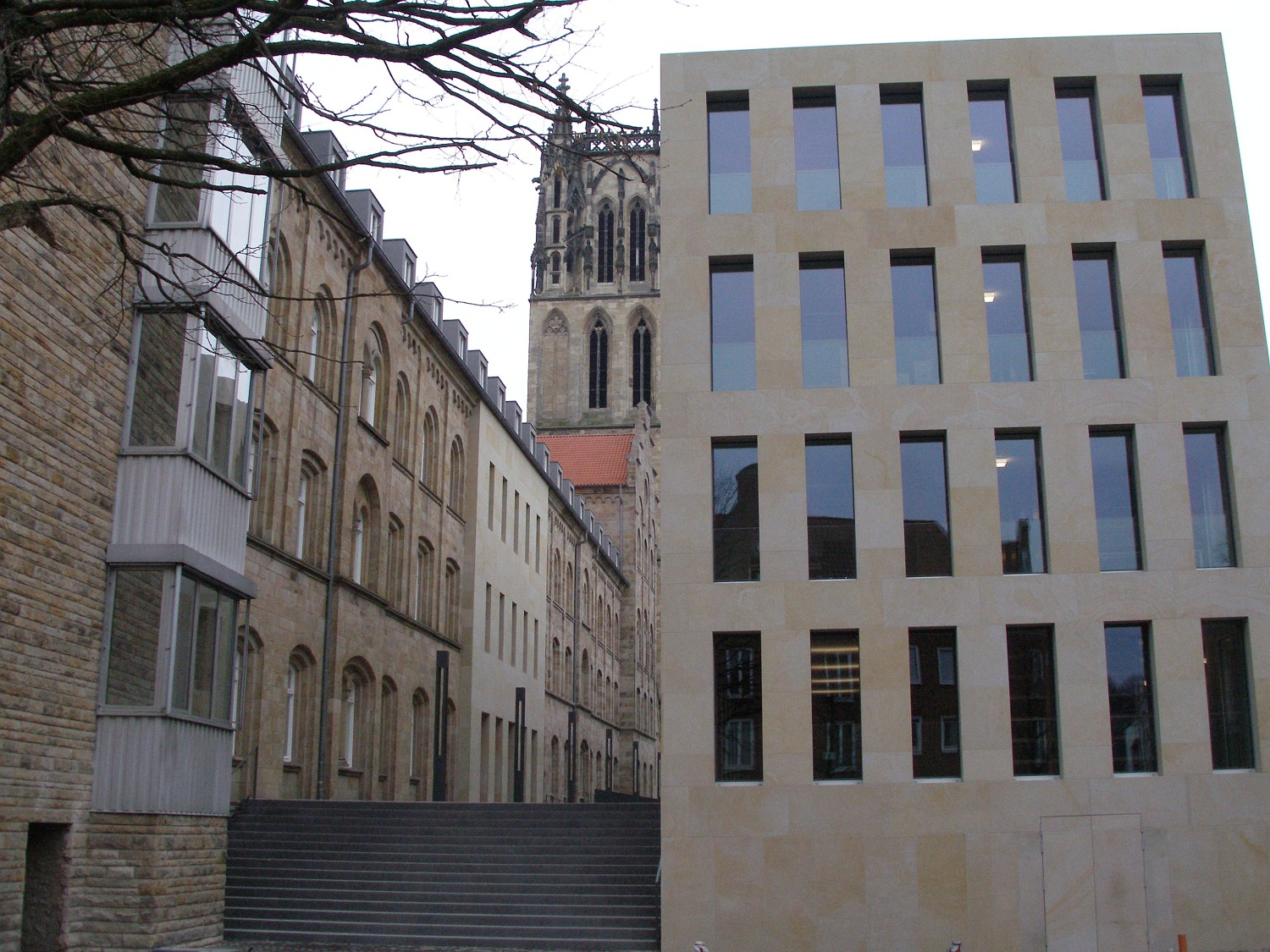
View of the library's west wing, the tower of the Überwasserkirche in the background

In Münster the collection was deposited in the Episcopal Museum of Christian antiquities and fell into disuse and was forgotten for many years. Only in the beginning of the 20th century Santini's library was rediscovered by the English musicologist Edward Dent. In 1923 the Bishop loaned Santini's library to the University of Münster, where the collection could be properly catalogued and analyzed. During World War II two-thirds of the University library were destroyed and the card catalogues were burned. Santini's library however escaped damage. After the first bombardments – as a safety measure – the collection had been moved to a Bishop's country residence. Today the Santini Collection is in the new library of the diocese of Münster. Here the precious manuscripts are deposited in a proper manner and can be consulted by all.

Santini composed sacred music which even today is unpublished. Some of his handwritten letters and scores are also kept in the library of the Conservatorio Giovanni Battista Martini | liceo musicale di Bologna

== Literature ==
- Fortunato Santini: Catalogo della musica esistente presso Fortunato Santini in Roma. Nel Palazzo de'Principi Odescalchi incontro la Chiesa de' SS.XII. Apostoli, Rom 1820
- Franz Sales Kandler: „Über den Musikzustand von Rom“, in: Münchener Allgemeine Musikzeitung 24, 26–30 (1828), Sp. 377–381, 407–415, 426–431, 445–448, 455–458, 471–475
- Alessandro Carcano: Considerazioni sulla Musica Antica. Intitolate All’ Ab. D. Fortunato Santini, Rom 1842
- Alessandro Carcano: Discorso per la inaugurazione del busto in cui per le cure dell’ egregio D. Fortunato Santini, dallo scultore Pietro Galli venne effigiato con mirabile eccellenza d’arte il sommo compositore Giov. Pierluigi da Palestrina detto il principe della musica; letto in Roma il giorno 29 febraro 1844 nella biblioteca Santini, Rom 1845
- Vladimir Stassoff: L’Abbé Santini et sa collection musicale à Rome, Florenz 1854
- Felix Mendelssohn Bartholdy: Reisebriefe von Felix Mendelssohn Bartholdy aus den Jahren 1830 bis 1830, hrsg. Von Paul Mendelssohn Bartholdy, Leipzig 1861
- Edward Joseph Dent: „The library of Fortunato Santini“, in: Monthly Musical Record 34 (1904), S. 64–65
- Joseph Killing: Kirchenmusikalische Schätze der Bibliothek des Abbate Fortunato Santini, Düsseldorf 1910
- Max Paul Killing: „Abbate Fortunato Santini und seine Bibliothek“, in: Musica sacra 44 (1911), S. 183–187
- Heinz Jansen: „Die Musikbibliothek des Abbate Santini“, in: Hochland. Monatsschrift für alle Gebiete des Wissens/der Literatur u. Kunst 23 (1925), S. 762–765
- Joseph Albert Hüntemann: Die Messen der Santini-Bibliothek zu Münster i.W. Ein Beitrag zur Geschichte der Messe, Münster 1928
- Friedrich Smend: „Zur Kenntnis des Musikers Fortunato Santini“, in: Westfälische Studien. Beiträge zur Geschichte der Wissenschaft, Kunst und Literatur in Westfalen. Alois Bömer zum 60. Geburtstag gewidmet, hrsg. von Hermann Degering und Walter Menn, Leipzig 1928, S. 90–98
- Heinrich Stute: Studien über den Gebrauch der Instrumente in dem italienischen Kirchenorchester des 18. Jahrhunderts. Ein Beitrag zur Geschichte der instrumental begleiteten Messe in Italien. Auf Grund des Materials in der Santini-Bibliothek zu Münster i.W., Münster 1929
- Karl Gustav Fellerer: Die musikalischen Schätze der Santinischen Sammlung. Führer durch die Ausstellung der Universitätsbibliothek Münster anlässlich des III. Westfälischen Musikfestes in Münster i. Westf. vom 15. bis 17. Juni 1929, Münster 1929
- Karl Gustav Fellerer: „Fortunato Santini als Sammler u. Bearbeiter Händelscher Werke“, in the Händel-Jahrbuch 2 (1929), pp. 25–40
- Karl Gustav Fellerer: „Bachs Johannes-Passion in der lateinischen Fassung Fortunato Santinis“, in: Festschrift Max Schneider, edited by Walther Vetter, Leipzig 1955, S. 139–145
- Rudolf Ewerhart: „Die Händel-Handschriften der Santini-Bibliothek in Münster“, in: Händel-Jahrbuch 6 (1960), S. 111–150
- Rudolf Ewerhart: Die Bischöfliche Santini-Bibliothek (Das schöne Münster 35), Münster 1962
- Vladimir Féderov: „V. V. Stasov chez l’abb. F. Santini à Rome“, in: Festschrift Anthony van Hoboken zum 75. Geburtstag, edited by Joseph Schmidt-Görg, Mainz 1962, pp. 55–62
- Vladimir Féderov: „A propos de quelques lettres de Santini à Bottée de Toulmon“, in Festschrift Karl Gustav Fellerer zum sechzigsten Geburtstag am 7. Juli 1962. Überreicht von Freunden und Schülern, hrsg. von Heinrich Hüschen, Regensburg 1962, S. 128–136
- Rudolf Ewerhart: Artikel „Santini“, in: Die Musik in Geschichte und Gegenwart, Band 11, Kassel, Basel, London, New York 1963, Sp. 1381–1383
- Keiichiro Watanabe: „Die Kopisten der Handschriften von den Werken G. F. Händels in der Santini-Bibliothek, Münster“, in: Ongaku Gaku 16 (1970), S. 225–262
- I. Medvedeva und S. Sigida: Fortunato Santini (1778–1862): Sobranie notnych rukopisej; annotirovannyj ukazatel’; fond imen’ych kollekcij biblioteki konservatorii; iz sobranija russkogo diplomata A. Ja. Skarjatina (Fortunato Santini (1778–1862): Sammlung der Notenmanuskripte; annotiertes Verzeichnis; Personalsammlungen-Bestand der Bibliothek des Kons.; aus der Sammlung des russ. Diplomaten A. J. Skarjatin), Moskau 1974
- Klaus Kindler: „Verzeichnis der musikalischen Werke Giuseppe Jannaconis (1740–1816) in der Santini-Sammlung in Münster (Westfalen)“, in: Fontes artis musicae 28 (1981), S. 313–319
- Luigi Ferdinando Tagliavini: „Johann Sebastian Bachs Musik in Italien im 18. und 19. Jahrhundert“, in: Festschrift Alfred Dürr, hrsg. von Wolfgang Rehm, Kassel u. a. 1983, pp. 301–324
- Richard Schaal: „Die Briefpartner des Wiener Musikforschers Aloys Fuchs“, in: Mozart-Jahrbuch (1989/90), S. 149–217
- Hans Joachim Marx: „The Santini Collection“, in: Handel Collections and their History, hrsg. von Terence Best, Oxford 1993, S. 184–197
- Martina Janitzek: „Santini – Stasov – Skarjatin. Drei Musiksammler“, in: Festschrift für Winfried Kirsch zum 65. Geburtstag (= Frankfurter Beiträge zur Musikwissenschaft 24), hrsg. von P. Ackermann u. a., Tutzing 1996, S. 219–227
- Heinrich Kettering: „Fortunato Santini in Rom und sein ‚sincero amico‘ Johann Bernhard Quante aus Coesfeld“, in: Eccetera. Das Italien-Kulturmagazin 4 (1996), S. 12–15
- Klaus Kindler: „Die Musiksammlung Fortunato Santinis in der Diözesanbibliothek zu Münster“, in: Mitteilungsblatt der Arbeitsgemeinschaft Katholisch-Theologischer Bibliotheken 45, Trier 1998, S. 137–145
- Siegfried Gmeinwieser: Santini, Fortunato. In: Biographisch-Bibliographisches Kirchenlexikon (BBKL). Band 15, Bautz, Herzberg 1999, ISBN 3-88309-077-8, Sp. 1250–1251.
- Sergio Lattes: Artikel „Santini, Fortunato“, in: The New Grove. Dictionary of Music and Musicians, 2. Aufl., hrsg. von Stanley Sadie, Bd. 22, London 2001, S. 258
- Andrea Ammendola: „Sacrae Musices Cultor et Propagator“. Fortunato Santinis Bearbeitung von Carl Heinrich Grauns "Der Tod Jesu" als Beispiel der Pflege deutscher geistlicher Musik im Italien des frühen 19. Jahrhunderts, Magisterarbeit, Münster 2005
- Andrea Ammendola: Artikel „Santini, Fortunato“, in: Die Musik in Geschichte und Gegenwart, 2. Aufl., Personenteil 14, Kassel 2005, Sp. 942–944
- Andrea Ammendola: „Fortunato Santinis Bearbeitung von Carl Heinrich Grauns Der Tod Jesu als Beispiel der Pflege deutscher geistlicher Musik in Italien des frühen 19. Jahrhunderts“, in: Kirchenmusikalisches Jahrbuch 90 (2006), S. 51–70
- Zsuzsanna Domokos: „Lisztʼs Roman Experience of Palestrina in 1839: The Importance of Fortunato Santiniʼs Library“, in: Journal of the American Liszt Society 22 (2006), S. 45–56
- Christoph Henzel: „Santini, Zelter und das Repertoire der Cappella Sistina um 1830“, in: Jahrbuch des Staatlichen Instituts für Musikforschung 2006/07 (2008), S. 136–149
- Giancarlo Rostirolla: "' Musica Antica'. Collezionismo e biblioteche musicali nella Roma di metà Ottocento. Il contributo di Fortunato Santini", in: Nuova rivista musicale italiana (2008/1), S. 5–56
- Giancarlo Rostirolla: "Riletture: Vladimir Vasilʼevič Stasov. L'abate Santini e la sua collezione musicale a roma", in: Nuova rivista musicale italiana (2008/3), S. 335–384
- Bianca Maria Antolini: "Fortunato Santini: collezionismo ed esecuzioni di musica antica a Roma nella prima metà dell’Ottocento", in: "La la la Maistre Henri …" Mélanges de musicologie offerts à Henri Vanhulst, hrsg. von Christine Ballman und Valérie Dufour, Turnhout 2009, S. 415–428
- Andrea Ammendola: "'… per farne conoscere il merito'. Händels Judas Maccabaeus in der Santini-Sammlung (Münster)", in: Gewalt – Bedrohung – Krieg: Georg Friedrich Händels Judas Maccabaeus. Interdisziplinäre Studien, hrsg. von Dominik Höink und Jürgen Heidrich, Göttingen 2010, S. 125–147
- Peter Schmitz: "Eine wenig bekannte Facette. Überlegungen zum kompositorischen Schaffen Fortunato Santinis", in Musiktheorie. Zeitschrift für Musikwissenschaft 25 (2010), S. 177–188
- Peter Schmitz und Andrea Ammendola (Hrsg.): Sammeln – Komponieren – Bearbeiten. Der römische Abbate Fortunato Santini im Spiegel seines Schaffens [Ausstellungskatalog zur gleichnamigen Ausstellung in der Diözesanbibliothek Münster vom 15. September bis 31. Dezember 2011], Münster 2011
- Andrea Ammendola: „Von Rom nach Münster: Zur Geschichte der Santini-Sammlung“, in: Sammeln – Komponieren – Bearbeiten. Der römische Abbate Fortunato Santini im Spiegel seines Schaffens[Ausstellungskatalog zur gleichnamigen Ausstellung in der Diözesanbibliothek Münster vom 15. September bis 31. Dezember 2011], Münster 2011, S. 40–47
- Andrea Ammendola: „„Per l’esercizio di Musica sagra Antica“: Fortunato Santini als Sammler vokalpolyphoner Werke“, in: Sammeln – Komponieren – Bearbeiten. Der römische Abbate Fortunato Santini im Spiegel seines Schaffens [Ausstellungskatalog zur gleichnamigen Ausstellung in der Diözesanbibliothek Münster vom 15. September bis 31. Dezember 2011], Münster 2011, S. 66–69
- Andrea Ammendola: „„...per farne conoscere il merito“. Fortunato Santinis Bearbeitungspraxis“, in: Sammeln – Komponieren – Bearbeiten. Der römische Abbate Fortunato Santini im Spiegel seines Schaffens [Ausstellungskatalog zur gleichnamigen Ausstellung in der Diözesanbibliothek Münster vom 15. September bis 31. Dezember 2011], Münster 2011, S. 93–97
- Anthony Hart: „A re-evaluation of the manuscripts of the keyboard sonatas of Domenico Scarlatti in the Santini collection in Münster“, in: studi musicali 2011, S. 49–66
- Ulrich Grimpe: "Fortunato Santini. Münsters bedeutendster Musikaliensammler", in: Neue Töne (2012/1), S. 9–12
- Peter Schmitz: "Fortunato Santini und die römische Händel-Pflege in der ersten Hälfte des 19. Jahrhunderts", in: Händel-Jahrbuch 58 (2012), S. 253–270
- Peter Schmitz: "'Questo Omero dell'italiana musica': Bemerkungen zur römischen Palestrina-Rezeption im Umfeld des Abbate Fortunato Santini", in: Kirchenmusikalisches Jahrbuch 96 (2012), S. 49–62
- Michael Werthmann: Zwischen konventionellem A-cappella-Ideal und kompositorischer Individualität: Studien zu Fortunato Santinis Requiemvertonungen, 2 Bde., maschr. Masterarbeit, Münster 2012 (Exemplar in: D-MÜms, D2 Sant 1050:1-2)
- Andrea Ammendola und Peter Schmitz (Hrsg.): „Sacrae Musices Cultor et Propagator“. Internationale Tagung zum 150. Todesjahr des Musiksammlers, Komponisten und Bearbeiters Fortunato Santini, Tagungsbericht Münster 14.–16. September 2011, Münster 2013
- Andrea Ammendola: „Fortunato Santinis Tu es Petrus-Vertonungen“, in: „Sacrae Musices Cultor et Propagator“. Internationale Tagung zum 150. Todesjahr des Musiksammlers, Komponisten und Bearbeiters Fortunato Santini, Tagungsbericht Münster 14.–16. September 2011, Münster 2013, S. 114–142
- Andrea Ammendola und Peter Schmitz: „Dokumente aus der Santini-Sammlung und dem Universitätsarchiv Münster“, in: „Sacrae Musices Cultor et Propagator“. Internationale Tagung zum 150. Todesjahr des Musiksammlers, Komponisten und Bearbeiters Fortunato Santini, Tagungsbericht Münster 14.–16. September 2011, Münster 2013, S. 300–353
- Andrea Ammendola: Art. „Santini, Fortunato“, in: Lexikon der Kirchenmusik (= Enzyklopädie der Kirchenmusik 6/2), edited by Günther Massenkeil and Michael Zywietz, Bd. 2, Laaber 2013, S. 1195–1196.
- Andrea Ammendola: „Längst aus dem ‚Dornröschenschlaf‘ erwacht – Fortunato Santinis Musiksammlung in Münster“, in: Forum Musikbibliothek 39 (2018/1), S. 7–19
- Kirsten Krumeich: „, Musica Sacra, e Profana ... raccolta con sommo incommodo‘ – Schriftspuren des Sammlers Fortunato Santini“, in: klang*erbe – schrift*kultur. Max von Droste-Hülshoffs unbekannte Noten in der Diözesanbibliothek Münster (= ad fontem salientem, Schriften der Diözesanbibliothek Münster, Bd. 2), edited by Kirsten Krumeich, Münster 2018, S. 54–75

== Film ==
- Santini's Network (La rete di Santini, Italy/Germany 2014), director: Georg Brintrup with Renato Scarpa as Fortunato Santini
