= Gian Francesco Malipiero =

Italian composer (1882–1973)

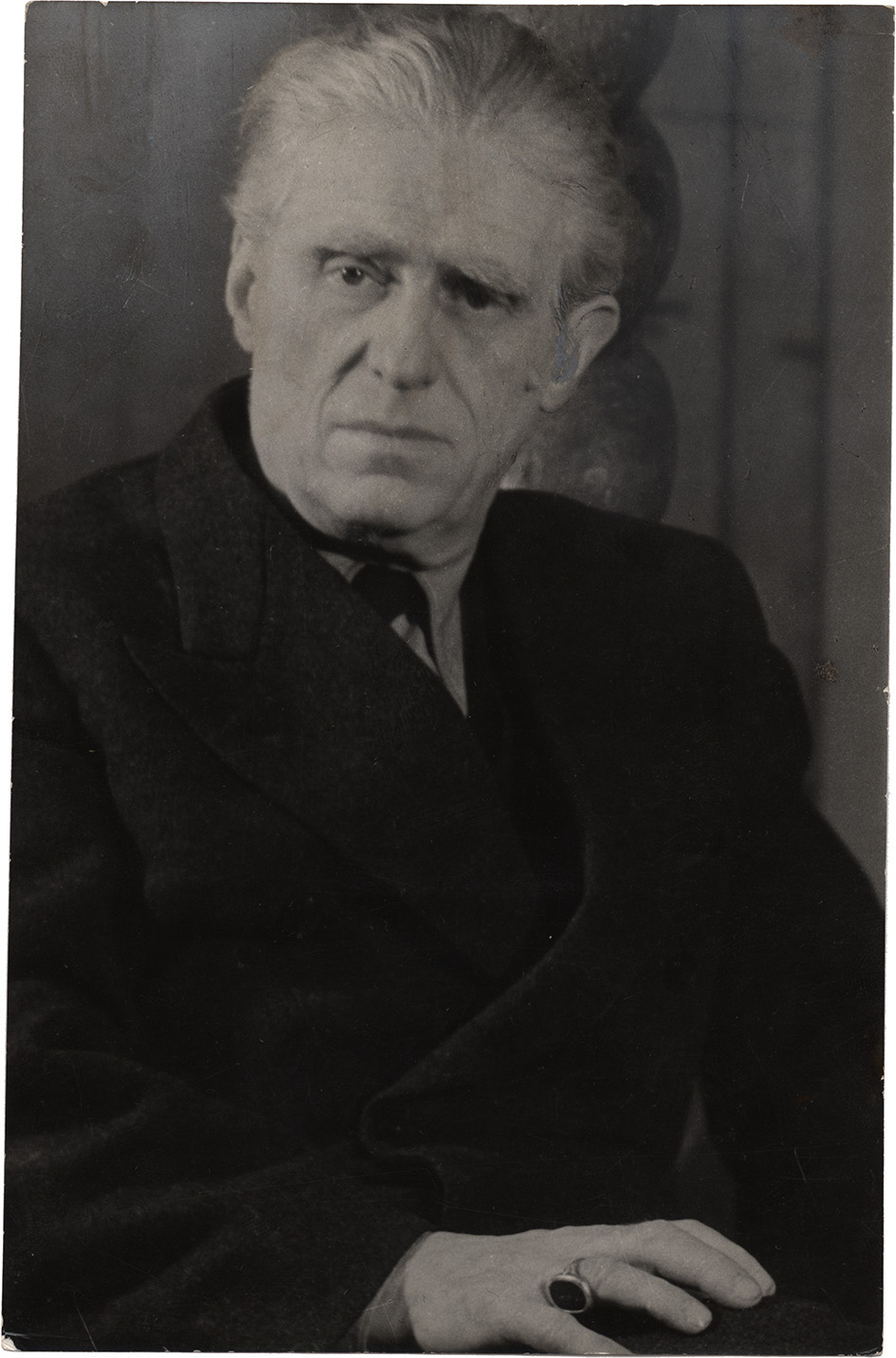
- Malipiero before 1973
- Born: March 18, 1882; Venice, Italy
- Died: August 1, 1973 (aged 91); Treviso, Italy
- Education: Liceo Musicale
- Occupations: Composer, teacher

Gian Francesco Malipiero (Italian pronunciation: [ˈdʒaɱ franˈtʃesko maliˈpjɛːro]; 18 March 1882 – 1 August 1973) was an Italian composer, musicologist, music teacher and editor.

== Early life and education ==
Born on 18 March 1882 in Venice into an aristocratic family, the grandson of the opera composer Francesco Malipiero, Gian Francesco Malipiero was prevented by family troubles from pursuing his musical education in a consistent manner. His father separated from his mother in 1893 and took Gian Francesco to Trieste, to Berlin and eventually to Vienna. The young Malipiero and his father broke up their relationship bitterly, and in 1899 Malipiero returned to his mother's home in Venice, where he entered the Venice Liceo Musicale (now the Conservatorio di Musica Benedetto Marcello di Venezia).

After stopping counterpoint lessons with the composer, organist and pedagogue Marco Enrico Bossi, Malipiero continued studying on his own by copying out music by such composers as Claudio Monteverdi and Girolamo Frescobaldi from the Biblioteca Marciana, in Venice, thereby beginning a lifelong commitment to Italian music of that period. In 1904 he went to Bologna and sought out Bossi to continue his studies, at the Bologna Liceo Musicale (now the Conservatorio Giovanni Battista Martini). In 1906 he returned to the Venice Conservatory Benedetto Marcello of Music to continue his studies. After graduating, Malipiero became an assistant to the blind composer Antonio Smareglia.

== Career ==
In 1905 Malipiero returned to Venice, but from 1906 to 1909 was often in Berlin, following Max Bruch's classes. Later, in 1913, Malipiero moved to Paris, where he became acquainted with compositions by Ravel, Debussy, Falla, Schoenberg, and Berg. Most importantly, he attended the première of Stravinsky's Le Sacre du Printemps, soon after meeting Alfredo Casella and Gabriele d'Annunzio. He described the experience as an awakening "from a long and dangerous lethargy". After that, he repudiated almost all the compositions he had written up to that time, with the exception of Impressioni dal vero (1910–11). At that time he won four composition prizes at the Accademia Nazionale di Santa Cecilia in Rome, by entering five compositions under five different pseudonyms.

In 1917, due to the Italian defeat at Caporetto, he was forced to flee from Venice and settled in Rome.

In 1923, he joined with Alfredo Casella and Gabriele D'Annunzio in creating the Corporazione delle Nuove Musiche. Malipiero was on good terms with Benito Mussolini until he set Pirandello's libretto La favola del figlio cambiato, earning the condemnation of the fascists. Malipiero dedicated his next opera, Giulio Cesare, to Mussolini, but this did not help him.

He was a professor of composition at the Parma Conservatory from 1921 to 1924. In 1932 he became professor of composition at the then Venice Liceo Musicale, which he directed from 1939 to 1952. Among others, he taught Luigi Nono and his own nephew Riccardo Malipiero. See: List of music students by teacher: K to M#Gian Francesco Malipiero.

After permanently settling in the little town of Asolo in 1923, Malipiero began the editorial work for which he would become best known, a complete edition of all of Claudio Monteverdi's oeuvre, from 1926 to 1942, and after 1952, editing much of Vivaldi's concerti at the Istituto Italiano Antonio Vivaldi.

== Death ==
Malipiero died on 1 August 1973 in Treviso, Italy.

== Compositions ==
Malipiero had an ambivalent attitude towards the musical tradition dominated by Austro-German composers, and instead insisted on the rediscovery of pre-19th-century Italian music.

His orchestral works include seventeen compositions he called symphonies, of which however only eleven are numbered. The first was composed in 1933, when Malipiero was already over fifty years old. Prior to that, Malipiero had written several important orchestral pieces but avoided the word "sinfonia" (symphony) almost completely. This was due to his rejection of the Austro-German symphonic tradition. The only exceptions to that are the three compositions Sinfonia degli eroi (1905), Sinfonia del mare (1906) and Sinfonie del silenzio e della morte (1909–1910). In such early works, the label "symphony" should not, however, be interpreted as indicating works in the Beethovenian or Brahmsian symphonic style, but more as symphonic poems.

When asked in the mid-1950s by the British encyclopedia The World of Music, Malipiero listed as his most important compositions the following pieces:

- Pause del Silenzio for orchestra, composed in 1917
- Rispetti e Strambotti for string quartet, composed in 1920
- L'Orfeide for the stage, composed between 1918 and 1922, and first performed in 1924
- La Passione, a mystery play composed in 1935
- his nine symphonies, composed between 1933 and 1955 (he would compose additional symphonies in the years after this list was made)

He regarded Impressioni dal vero, for orchestra, as his earliest work of lasting importance.

== Musical theory and style ==
Malipiero was strongly critical of sonata form and, in general, of standard thematic development in composition. He declared:

As a matter of fact I rejected the easy game of thematic development because I was fed up with it and it bored me to death. Once one finds a theme, turns it around, dismembers it and blows it up, it is not very difficult to assemble the first movement of a symphony (or a sonata) that will be amusing for amateurs and also satisfy the lack of sensitivity of the knowledgeable.

Malipiero's musical language is characterized by an extreme formal freedom; he always renounced the academic discipline of variation, preferring the more anarchic expression of song, and he avoided falling into program music descriptivism. Until the first half of the 1950s, Malipiero remained tied to diatonism, maintaining a connection with the pre-19th-century Italian instrumental music and Gregorian chant, moving then slowly to increasingly eerie and tense territories that put him closer to total chromaticism. He did not abandon his previous style but he reinvented it. In his latest pages, it is possible to recognize suggestions from his pupils Luigi Nono and Bruno Maderna.

His compositions are based on free, non-thematic passages as much as in thematic composition, and seldom do movements end in the keys in which they started.

When Malipiero approached the symphony, he did not do so in the so-called post-Beethovenian sense, and for this reason authors rather described his works as "sinfonias" (the Italian term), to emphasize Malipiero's fundamentally Italian, anti-Germanic approach. He remarked:

The Italian symphony is a free kind of poem in several parts which follow one another capriciously, obeying only those mysterious laws that instinct recognizes

As Ernest Ansermet once declared, "these symphonies are not thematic but 'motivic': that is to say Malipiero uses melodic motifs like everyone else [...] they generate other motifs, they reappear, but they do not carry the musical discourse – they are, rather, carried by it".

== Reception ==
The French conductor Antonio de Almeida led the Moscow Symphony Orchestra in recordings of the complete Malipiero symphonies for Naxos (Marco Polo, 1993–1994).

Recently, Malipiero's piano repertoire, including his complete concertos, has experienced a revival at the hands of noted Italian pianist Sandro Ivo Bartoli.

Malipiero was the subject of the 1985 biographical film Poems of Asolo by Georg Brintrup.

== Selected works ==
=== Operas ===
- L'Orfeide (1919–1922, Düsseldorf 1925), in tre parti:

- I "La morte delle maschere",
- II "Sette canzoni",
- III "Orfeo"

- Tre commedie goldoniane (1920–1922, Darmstadt 1926) :

- I "La bottega da caffè",
- II "Sior Todero Brontolon",
- III "Le baruffe Chiozotte"

- Filomela e l'infatuato (1925, Prague 1928)
- Torneo notturno (1929)
- La favola del figlio cambiato (libretto di Luigi Pirandello, 1933)
- Giulio Cesare (da Shakespeare (1935, Genoa 1936)
- Antonio e Cleopatra (da Shakespeare, 1937, Florence 1938)
- I capricci di Callot (da E.T.A. Hoffmann, 1942, Rome 1942)
- L'allegra brigata (1943, Milan 1950)
- Mondi celesti ed infernali (1949, Venice 1961)
- Il figliuol prodigo (1952, Florence 1957)
- Donna Urraca, atto unico (1954)
- Venere prigioniera (1955, Florence 1957)
- Il marescalco (1960, Treviso 1969)
- Don Giovanni (1963, Naples)
- Rappresentazione e festa di Carnasciale e della Quaresima (Opera balletto, 1961, Venice 1970)
- Le metamorfosi di Bonaventura (Venice 1966)
- Don Tartufo bacchettone (1966, Venice 1970)
- Iscariota (1971)

=== Orchestral music ===
- Dai sepolcri (1904)
- Sinfonia degli eroi (1905)
- Sinfonia del mare (1906)
- Sinfonia del silenzio e de la morte (1909–1910)
- Impressioni dal vero prima parte (1910)
- Impressioni dal vero seconda parte (1915)
- Ditirambo tragico (1917)
- Pause del Silenzio (1917)
- Grottesco (1918)
- Ballet Pantea (1919)
- Cimarosiana (1921), five symphonic fragments from keyboard works of Cimarosa
- Impressioni dal vero terza parte (1922)
- Concerti (1931)
- Concerto n.1 for Piano and Orchestra (1931)
- Inni (1932)
- Concerto n.1 for Violin and Orchestra (1932)
- Sette Invenzioni (1933)
- Sinfonia n.1 "In quattro tempi, come le quattro stagioni" (1933)
- Sinfonia n.2 "Elegiaca" (1936)
- Concerto for Cello and Orchestra (1937)
- Concerto n.2 for Piano and Orchestra (1937)
- Concerto a tre for Violin, Cello, Piano and Orchestra (1938)
- Sinfonia n.3 "Delle campane" (1944–1945)
- Sinfonia n.4 "In memoriam" (1946)
- Sinfonia n.5 "Concertante in eco" (1947)
- Sinfonia n.6 "Degli archi" (1947)
- Ballet Stradivario (1948)
- Sinfonia n.7 "Delle canzoni" (1948)
- Concerto n.3 per pianoforte e orchestra (1948)
- Concerto n.4 per pianoforte e orchestra (1950)
- Sinfonia in un tempo (1950)
- Sinfonia dello Zodiaco "Quattro partite: dalla primavera all'inverno" (1951)
- Ballet El mondo novo (1951)
- Vivaldiana (1952)
- Passacaglie (1952)
- Fantasie di ogni giorno (1953)
- Elegia capriccio (1953)
- Fantasie concertanti (1954)
- Notturno di canti e balli (1957)
- Concerto n.5 for Piano and Orchestra (1958)
- Sinfonia per Antigenida (1962)
- Concerto n.2 for Violin and Orchestra (1963)
- Sinfonia n.8 "Symphonia brevis" (1964)
- Concerto n.6 for Piano and Orchestra (1964)
- Sinfonia n.9 "Dell'Ahimè" (1966)
- Sinfonia n.10 "Atropo" (1966–1967)
- Concerto per flauto e orchestra (1968)
- Sinfonia n.11 "Delle cornamuse" (1969)
- Gabrieliana (1971)
- Omaggio a Belmonte (1971)

=== Chamber music ===
- Sonata for Cello and Piano (1907–1908)
- Canto della Lontananza for Violin and Piano (1919)
- String Quartet n.1 "Rispetti e strambotti" (1920)
- String Quartet n.2 "Stornelli e ballate" (1923)
- String Quartet n.3 "Cantari alla madrigalesca" (1931)
- Epodi e giambi for Violin, oboe, viola e fagotto (1932)
- String Quartet n.4 (1934)
- Sonata a cinque per flauto, arpa, viola, violino e violoncello (1934)
- String Quartet n.5 "dei capricci" (1941–1950)
- Sonatina for Cello and Piano (1942)
- String Quartet n.6 "l'Arca di Noé" (1947)
- String Quartet n.7 (1950)
- Sonata a quattro for flute, oboe, clarinet and bassoon (1954)
- Serenata mattutina per 10 strumenti (1959)
- Serenata per fagotto e 10 strumenti (1961)
- Macchine per 14 strumenti (1963)
- String Quartet n.8 "per Elisabetta" (1964)
- Endecatode per 14 strumenti e percussione (1966)

=== Piano music ===
- 6 morceaux (6 pezzi) (1905)
- Bizzarrie luminose dell'alba, del meriggio, della notte (1908)
- 3 danze antiche (1910)
- Poemetti lunari (1909–10)
- Tre improvvisi per Pianola
- Impressioni (vor 1914)
- Preludi autunnali (1914)
- Poemi asolani (1916)
- Barlumi (1917)
- Maschere che passano (1918)
- Risonanze (1918)
- La siesta (1920)
- A Claude Debussy (1920)
- Omaggi: a un pappagallo, a un elefante, a un idiota (1920)
- Cavalcate (1921)
- Il tarlo (1922)
- Pasqua di resurrezione (1924)
- 3 preludi e una fuga (1926)
- Epitaffio (1931)
- Prélude à une fugue imaginaire (1932)
- I minuetti di Ca'Tiepolo (1932)
- Preludio, ritmi e canti gregoriani (1937)
- Preludio e fuga (1940)
- Hortus conclusus (1946)
- Stradivario für 2 Klaviere (1955)
- Dialogo no.2 für 2 Klaviere (1955)
- 5 studi per domani (1959)
- Variazione sulla pantomima dell'"Amor brujo" di Manuel de Falla (1959)
- Bianchi e neri (1964)

=== Vocal works ===
- Tre poesie di Angelo Poliziano (1920)
- San Francesco d'Assisi, mistero per soli, coro e orchestra (1920–1921, New York 1922)
- Quattro sonetti del Burchiello (1921)
- Due sonetti del Berni (1922)
- Le Stagioni Italiche per soprano e pianoforte (1923, Venise 1925)
- La Cena, cantata per coro e orchestra (1927, Rochester 1929)
- Commiato per una voce di baritono e orchestra (1934)
- La Passione, cantata per coro e orchestra (Rome 1935)
- De Profundis per una voce, viola e bass drum e pianoforte (Venise 1937)
- Missa Pro Mortuis per baritono, coro e orchestra (Rome 1938)
- Quattro Vecchie Canzoni per voce e strumenti (1940, Washington 1941)
- Santa Eufrosina, mistero per soprano, due baritoni, coro e orchestra (Rome 1942)
- Le Sette Allegrezze d'Amore per voce e strumenti (Milan 1945)
- La Terra, dalle Georgiche di Virgilio (1946)
- Mondi celesti for soprano and ten instruments (1948, Capri 1949)
- La Festa della Sensa per baritone, chorus and orchestra (1949–1950, Brussels 1954)
- Cinque favole (1950)
- Preludio e morte di Macbeth for baritone and orchestra (1958, Milan 1960)
- Sette canzonette veneziane for voice and piano (1960)

=== Film scores ===
- Steel (1933)

== Bibliography ==
- Sorce Keller, Marcello. “A Bent for Aphorisms: Some Remarks about Music and about His Own Music by Gian Francesco Malipiero”, The Music Review, XXXIX(1978), no. 3–4, 231–239.
- Lanza, Andrea (2008). "An Outline of Italian Instrumental Music in the 20th Century". Sonus. A Journal of Investigations into Global Musical Possibilities. 29/1: 1–21. ISSN 0739-229X.
