= Sol Negro =

Studio album by Virginia Rodrigues
- Released: 1997
- Label: Natasha; Hannibal
- Producer: Caetano Veloso, Celso Fonseca

Virginia Rodrigues chronology
Sol Negro (1997)	Nós (2000)

Sol Negro is the debut album by the Brazilian musician Virginia Rodrigues. It was released in 1997. The album peaked at No. 7 on Billboard's World Albums chart.

== Production ==
The album was produced by Caetano Veloso and Celso Fonseca; Veloso had "discovered" the singer at a rehearsal. Djavan, Milton Nascimento, and Gilberto Gil contributed to the album. The berimbau was used on several tracks. A few songs are tributes to Rodrigues's Candomblé religion.

Rodrigues sang a cappella on "Verônica". "Manhã de Carnaval" is a cover of the Luiz Bonfá song; "Noite de Temporal" is a cover of the Dorival Caymmi song. "Adeus Batucada" was made famous by Carmen Miranda.

== Critical reception ==
Professional ratings
Review scores
Source	Rating
AllMusic	4.5/5 stars
Robert Christgau	B−
Edmonton Journal	4/5 stars
The Encyclopedia of Popular Music	4/5 stars
MusicHound World: The Essential Album Guide	5/5 stars

JazzTimes wrote that "Rodrigues’s contralto voice is otherwordly, spiritual, exquisite." Robert Christgau noted that she "never stretches her rich, Ella-like highs into a scat—though the few midtempo numbers have a nice jazzy lilt ... her instincts are exceedingly solemn." Rolling Stone stated: "The ancient and the modern, the secular and the sacred seamlessly mingle in this document of Brazilian musical forms."

Miami New Times deemed the album "a simultaneously somber and uplifting cycle of songs focused on the African experience in Brazil." The New York Times concluded that "the record is both modern and roots-conscious in the best ways that Brazilians know how to be: it swings from Roman Catholic church music to carnaval sambas, ancient Afro-Brazilian drum patterns to sophisticated wind-and-string arrangements, all sculpted with delicate care." The Chicago Tribune considered Sol Negro to be the eighth best album of 1998.

AllMusic wrote that Rodrigues's "first major recording succeeds in juxtaposing her ability to carry both lilting Brazilian rhythms and slow harmonious melodies.

== Track listing ==
No.	Title	Length
1.	"Negrume da Noite"
2.	"Lua, Lua, Lua, Lua"
3.	"Adeus Batucada"
4.	"Manhã de Carnaval"
5.	"Verônica"
6.	"Noite de Temporal"
7.	"Terra Seca"
8.	"Nobreza"
9.	"Sol Negro"
10.	"Querubim"
11.	"Israfel"
