= Santini's Network =

- Directed by: Georg Brintrup
- Written by: Georg Brintrup; Mario Di Desidero
- Produced by: Lichtspiel Entertainment; Wulf-Ernst Hoffer; Westdeutscher Rundfunk
- Starring: Renato Scarpa
- Cinematography: Benjamin Hasenclever; Marco Leopardi; Diego D'Innocenzo; Dieter Fietzke; Alessandro Iafulla; Valerio Cesaroni
- Edited by: Georg Brintrup
- Release date: 9 April 2014
- Running time: 85 minutes
- Countries: Italy; Germany
- Languages: Italian, German, English

Santini's Network (original title: La Rete di Santini) (2014) is a biographical film by German filmmaker Georg Brintrup on the life of Roman music collector Fortunato Santini (1777–1861) and how his famous private assembly of manuscript scores grew into the greatest music collection of the age.

== Plot ==
The subject portrays an extraordinary story and a fascinating itinerary of survival through unusual episodes in the progress of culture. When, at the turn of the eighteenth century, the Roman clergyman, Fortunato Santini, played by Italian actor Renato Scarpa, discovers at the age of twenty his fervent passion for music, he decides to dedicate the rest of his life to collecting the manuscript scores of the great composers, either autographs in their own hand or scores written out by professional copyists. These manuscripts kept and preserved the heritage of musical works until their reproduction and publication as printed scores. Over the course of fifty years his music collection swelled to 20,000 titles in 4,500 manuscripts and 1,200 printed copies, making it the most comprehensive collection of its kind anywhere. Santini's secret in preserving all these important works from the history of European music is the elaborate network of friends and acquaintances that he builds. Beginning in the libraries and among the cognoscenti of Italy, its reach extends throughout Europe, stretching from Rome to Vienna, from Paris to London, from Berlin to Moscow. Through his networking skills during his lifetime Santini became an international celebrity in the world of music Compositions of the first importance in music history, otherwise at risk of disappearing into oblivion, were rescued and preserved through his unremitting efforts.

The film deals not only with the inception and growth of Santini's precious collection, but also with its conservation after his death. In 1862 the collection was purchased and transported from Italy to the city of Münster in Germany and lay there forgotten for 40 years. Then in 1902 this trove was rediscovered and brought to the attention of the public through by the work of Edward Dent, the distinguished British musicologist. Subsequently, the collection was saved from firebombs during World War II, and though partially damaged after the war by a devastating flood, the irreplaceable musical opus of Santini has survived.

== Cast ==
- Renato Scarpa: Fortunato Santini
- John Gayford: Edward Dent
- Maximilian Scheidt: Felix Mendelssohn
- Harald Redmer: Carl Friedrich Zelter
- Domenico Galasso: Giuseppe Baini
- Claudio Marchione: Giuseppe Jannacconi
- Pietro M. Beccatini: Carlo Odescalchi
- Antonio Giovannini: Mariano Astolfi
- Florian Steffens: young Edward Dent
- Emanuele Paragallo: young Fortunato Santini

== Film music ==
The Soundtrack is composed of musical pieces from Santini's collection, some performed for the first time under conductor Favio Colusso by the Ensemble Seicentonovecento.

Nr.	Author	Title
1.	Antonio Lotti	Crucifixus
2.	Tomás Luis de Victoria	Salve Regina
3.	Cristóbal de Morales	Lamentabatur Jacob
4.	Giacomo Carissimi	Jephte, Plorate filii Israel
5.	Antonio Caldara	Kyrie from the Missa Dolorosa
6.	Francesco Durante	Lamentationes Jeremiae Prophetae
7.	Palestrina	Kyrie from the Missa Ut-Re-Mi-Fa-So-La
8.	Giovanni Battista Martini	Sonata g-minor for Organ, Sarabanda
9.	Palestrina	Aleph III
10.	Carl Heinrich Graun	Der Tod Jesu
11.	Georg Friedrich Händel	Non esce un guardo mai
12.	Georg Friedrich Händel	Resurrezione
13.	Alessandro Melani	Magnificat
14.	Johann Sebastian Bach	Passio secundum Joannem
15.	Fortunato Santini	Te Deum a Due Cori
16.	Domenico Scarlatti	Sonatas in f-Minor K. 519
17.	Francesco Durante	Requiem Lacrimosa
18.	Alessandro Scarlatti	Agar et Ismaele esiliati, grave
19.	Domenico Scarlatti	sonata in f-Minor L.281 K.239
20.	Georg Friedrich Händel	Israel in Egypt / a thick darkness
21.	Fortunato Santini	Sancte Paule Apostole

Some other background music was composed by Flavio Colusso.

== Release and reception ==
Santini's Network premiered at the Auditorium of Santa Maria dell’Anima in Rome on 1 April 2014 and in Münster's Schloßtheater on 9 April 2014. Film critic Günter Moseler: "A great film about a modest life for the future of Early Music." (Ein großer Film über ein kleines Leben für die Zukunft Alter Musik.). First broadcast was in Westdeutscher Rundfunk on 28 April 2014.
