= Gisela Stein =

German actress (1935–2009)

- Born: 2 October 1935; Swinemünde, Pomerania, Germany, (now Świnoujście, Poland)
- Died: 4 May 2009 (aged 73); Mohrkirch, Schleswig-Holstein, Germany
- Occupation: German actress

Gisela Stein (2 October 1935 – 4 May 2009) was a German actress.

== Biography ==
Stein was born in Swinemünde (now Świnoujście, Poland) and educated at the Wiesbaden actors school. She began her stage career in Koblenz, Krefeld-Mönchengladbach and Essen with Erwin Piscator. In 1960 Stein moved to Berlin, where she worked for the next 19 years. Stein appeared also at the Schauspielhaus Zürich, the Staatstheater Stuttgart and the Salzburg Festival. In 1980 she moved to Munich, where she stood at the Munich Kammerspiele until 2001.

Stein died on 4 May 2009 at Mohrkirch, Schleswig-Holstein, aged 73, from undisclosed causes.

== Selected filmography ==
- Derrick - Season 10, Episode 10: "Dr. Römer und der Mann des Jahres" (1983)
- Putting Things Straight (Ich räume auf) - TV movie with Gisela Stein playing the part of poet Else Lasker-Schüler, a main female representative of German Expressionism. The film was first broadcast on 23 December 1979 by Westdeutscher Rundfunk. It was shown at the 1980 International Film Festival Rotterdam. director: Georg Brintrup

== Awards ==
- 1988 Deutscher Kritikerpreis
- Berliner Kunstpreis
- Berliner Staatsschauspielerin
- Bayerischer Maximiliansorden für Wissenschaft und Kunst
- Bayerischer Verdienstorden
- Bundesverdienstkreuz
- 2001 Oberbayerischer Kulturpreis
- 2004 Hermine Körner-Ring
