= Santini Collection =

The Santini Collection is an archive of musical scores dating back to the 18th century, originally the collection of Fortunato Santini, a Catholic priest born in a Roman orphanage in 1778. The archive contains autograph manuscripts by George Frideric Handel and Alessandro Scarlatti, and in some cases preserved the only copies of these works for many years.
