= Else Lasker-Schüler =

German poet and playwright (1869–1945)

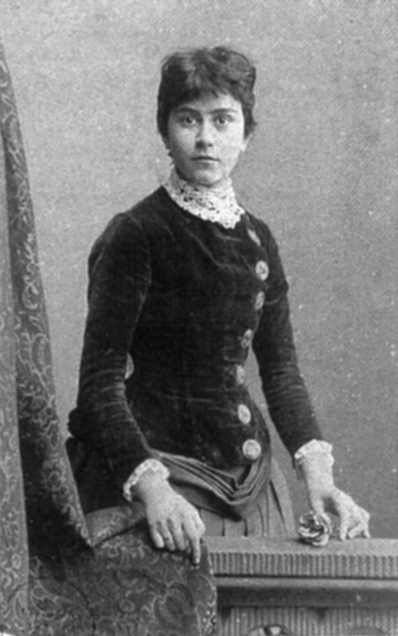
- Born: Elisabeth Schüler; 11 February 1869; Elberfeld, North German Confederation
- Died: 22 January 1945 (aged 75); Jerusalem, Mandatory Palestine
- Occupation: Poet

Else Lasker-Schüler (née Elisabeth Schüler) (German: [ˈɛl.zə ˈlas.kɐ ˈʃyː.lɐ]; 11 February 1869 – 22 January 1945) was a German poet and playwright. She was one of the few women affiliated with the Expressionist movement. Lasker-Schüler, who was Jewish, fled Nazi Germany and lived out the rest of her life in Jerusalem.

== Biography ==
Schüler was born in Elberfeld, now a district of Wuppertal. Her mother, Jeannette Schüler (née Kissing) was a central figure in her poetry; the main character of her play Die Wupper was inspired by her father, Aaron Schüler, a Jewish banker from Wuppertal. Her brother Paul died when she was 13.

Else was considered a child prodigy because she could read and write at the age of four. From 1880 she attended the Lyceum West an der Aue. After dropping out of school, she received private lessons at her parents' home.

In 1894, Else married the physician and chess master Berthold Lasker (the elder brother of Emanuel Lasker, a World Chess Champion) and moved with him to Berlin, where she trained as an artist. On 27 July 1890 her mother died, her father followed 7 years later. On 24 August 1899, her son Paul was born and her first poems were published. She published her first full volume of poetry, Styx, three years later, in 1902. On 11 April 1903, she and Berthold Lasker divorced and on 30 November, she married Georg Lewin, artist, and founder of the Expressionist magazine Der Sturm. His pseudonym, Herwarth Walden, was her invention.

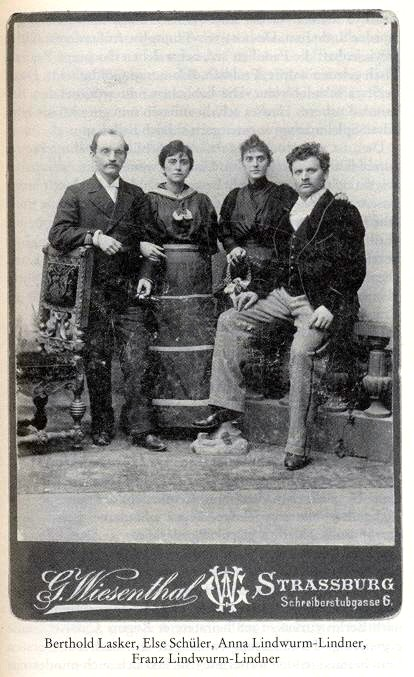
L to R: Berthold Lasker, Else Lasker-Schüler, Anna Lindwurm-Lindner, and Franz Lindwurm-Lindner; around 1900

Lasker-Schüler's first prose work, Das Peter-Hille-Buch, was published in 1906, after the death of Hille, one of her closest friends. In 1907, she published the prose collection Die Nächte der Tino von Bagdad, followed by the play Die Wupper in 1909, which was not performed until later. A volume of poetry called Meine Wunder, published in 1911, established Lasker-Schüler as the leading female representative of German Expressionism.

After separating from Herwarth Walden in 1910 and divorcing him in 1912, she found herself penniless and dependent on the financial support of her friends, in particular Karl Kraus. In 1912, she met Gottfried Benn. An intense friendship developed between them which found its literary outlet in a large number of love poems dedicated to him.

In May 1922 she attended the International Congress of Progressive Artists and signed the "Founding Proclamation of the Union of Progressive International Artists".

In 1927, the death of her son sent her into a deep depression.

Despite winning the Kleist Prize in 1932, as a Jew she was physically harassed and threatened by the Nazis. She emigrated to Zürich but there, too, she could not work and subsequently went to British-ruled Palestine in 1934, and finally settled in Jerusalem in 1937. In 1938 she was stripped of her German citizenship and the outbreak of World War II prevented any return to Europe.

According to her first Hebrew translator, Yehuda Amichai, she lived a life of poverty and the children in the neighborhood mocked her for her eccentric dress and behavior.

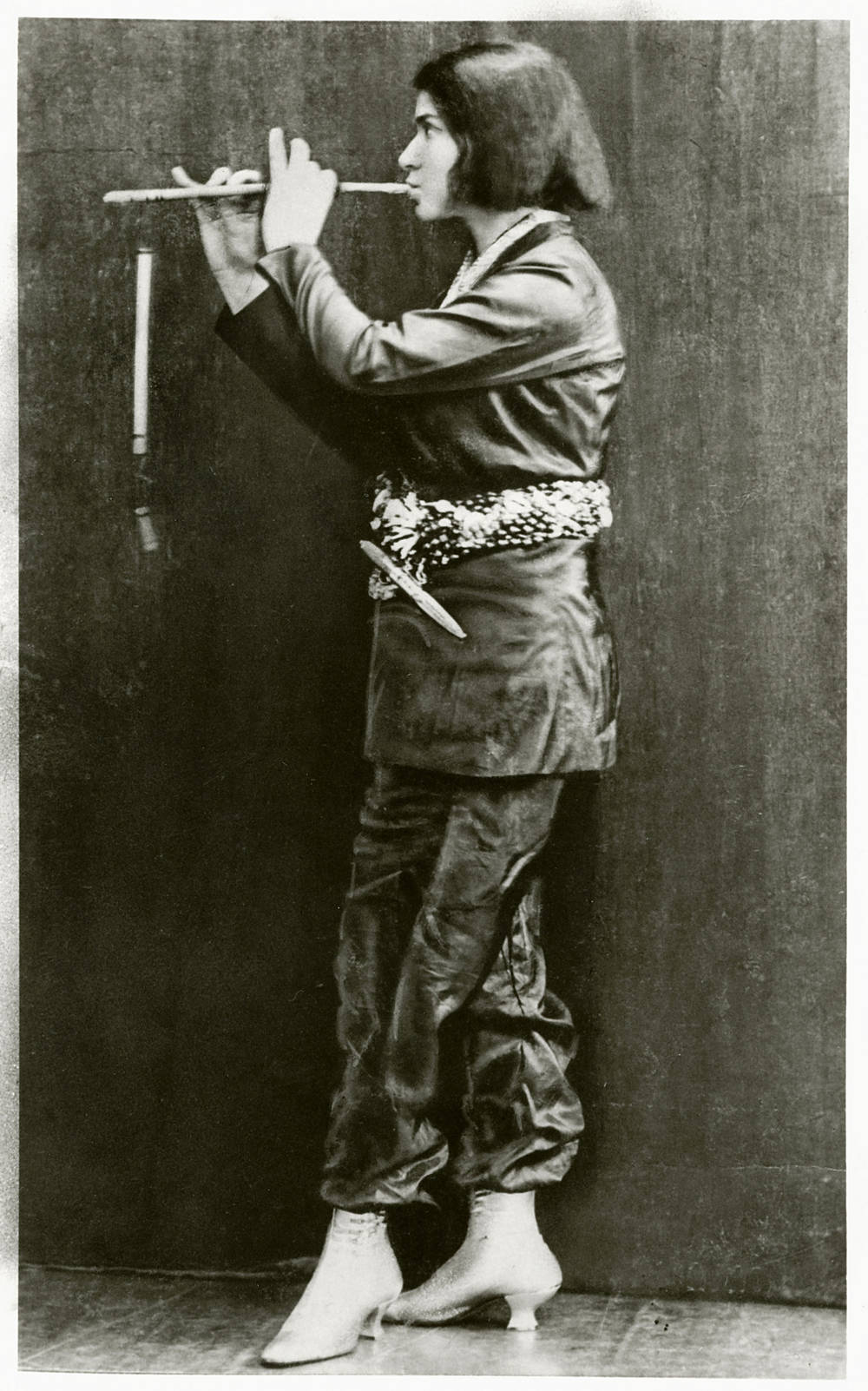
Lasker-Schüler dressed in an Oriental costume as her alternative persona "Prince Yussuf" (1912)

She formed a literary salon called “Kraal,” which philosopher Martin Buber opened on 10 January 1942 at the French Cultural Center.

Some leading Jewish writers and promising poets attended her literary programs, but Lasker-Schüler was eventually banned from giving readings and lectures because they were held in German. She begged the head of the German synagogue in Jerusalem to let her use his Gotteshaus ('house of worship, lit. 'house of God') one more time:

"Wherever I was, German is not allowed to be spoken. I want to arrange the last Kraal evening for a poet who is already broken, to recite from his translations [into German] of a great Hebrew" (Letter to Rabbi Kurt Wilhelm, Else Lasker-Schüler Archive, Jerusalem, cited in Bauschinger, p. 270).

In her final years, Lasker-Schüler worked on her drama IchundIch (IandI), which remained a fragment. She finished her volume of poems, Mein Blaues Klavier (1943, "My Blue Piano"), printed in a limited edition of 330 copies.

"[H]er literary farewell became her last attempt to overcome loneliness. Significantly, she dedicated the work to "my unforgettable friends in the cities of Germany and to those, like me, exiled and dispersed throughout the world, in good faith." In one of her final acts, she asked that her hometown of Wuppertal and its surrounding area be spared from Allied bombing."

She tended to spend whatever money she had all at once which made her go for days without food or shelter. Heinz Gerling, secretary of the Hitachdut Olei Germania (Association of Immigrants from Germany, later renamed to cover all of Central Europe) and the poet Manfred Sturmann came to her aid. Gerling opened a bank account for her and arranged for regular payments to cover her expenses whereas Sturmann edited her work and helped with her dealings with publishers. After her death, Sturmann became the trustee of her legacy and during the 1950s and 1960s dealt extensively with publishers in East and West Germany, Switzerland and Austria who wished to publish her works.

In 1944, Lasker-Schüler's health deteriorated. She suffered a heart attack on 16 January, and died in Jerusalem on 22 January 1945. She was buried on the Mount of Olives Jewish Cemetery.

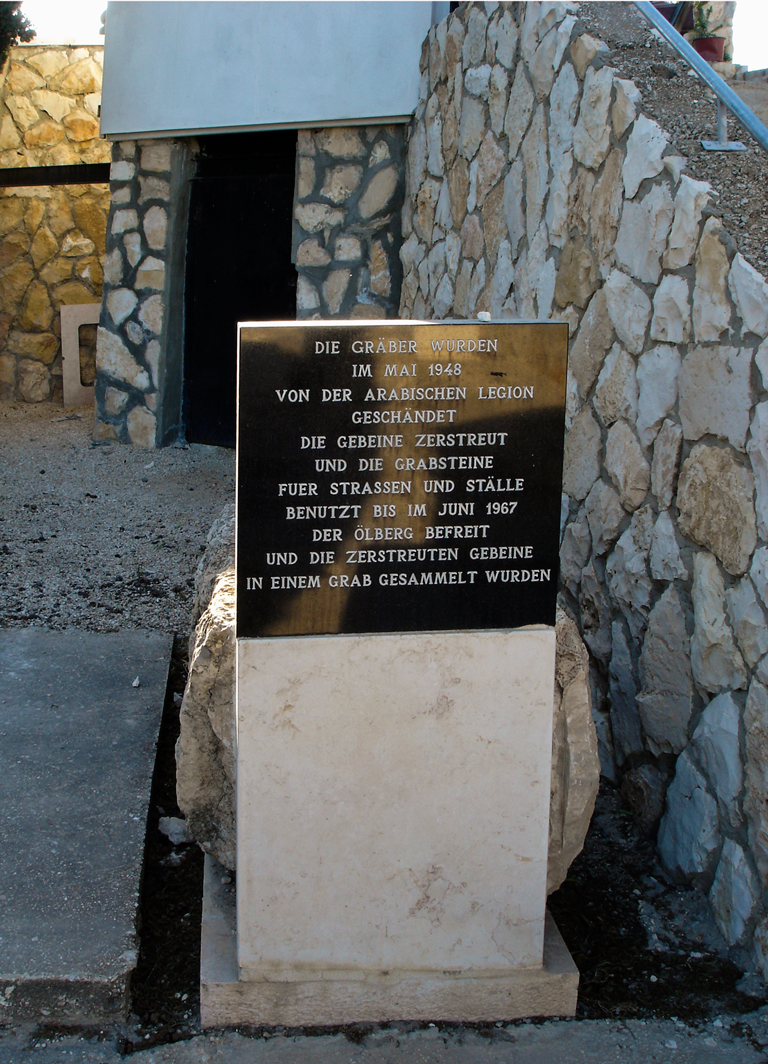
The grave of Else Lasker-Schüler on the Mount of Olives in Jerusalem

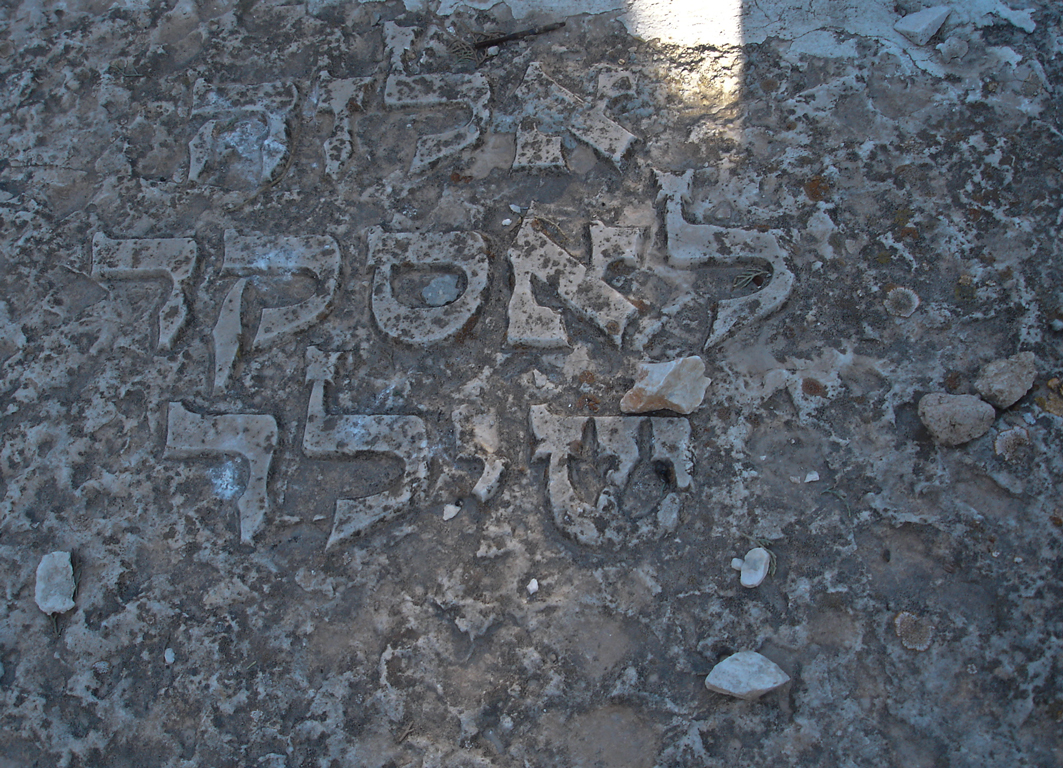
The grave of Else Lasker-Schüler – Hebrew inscription

== Literary career ==
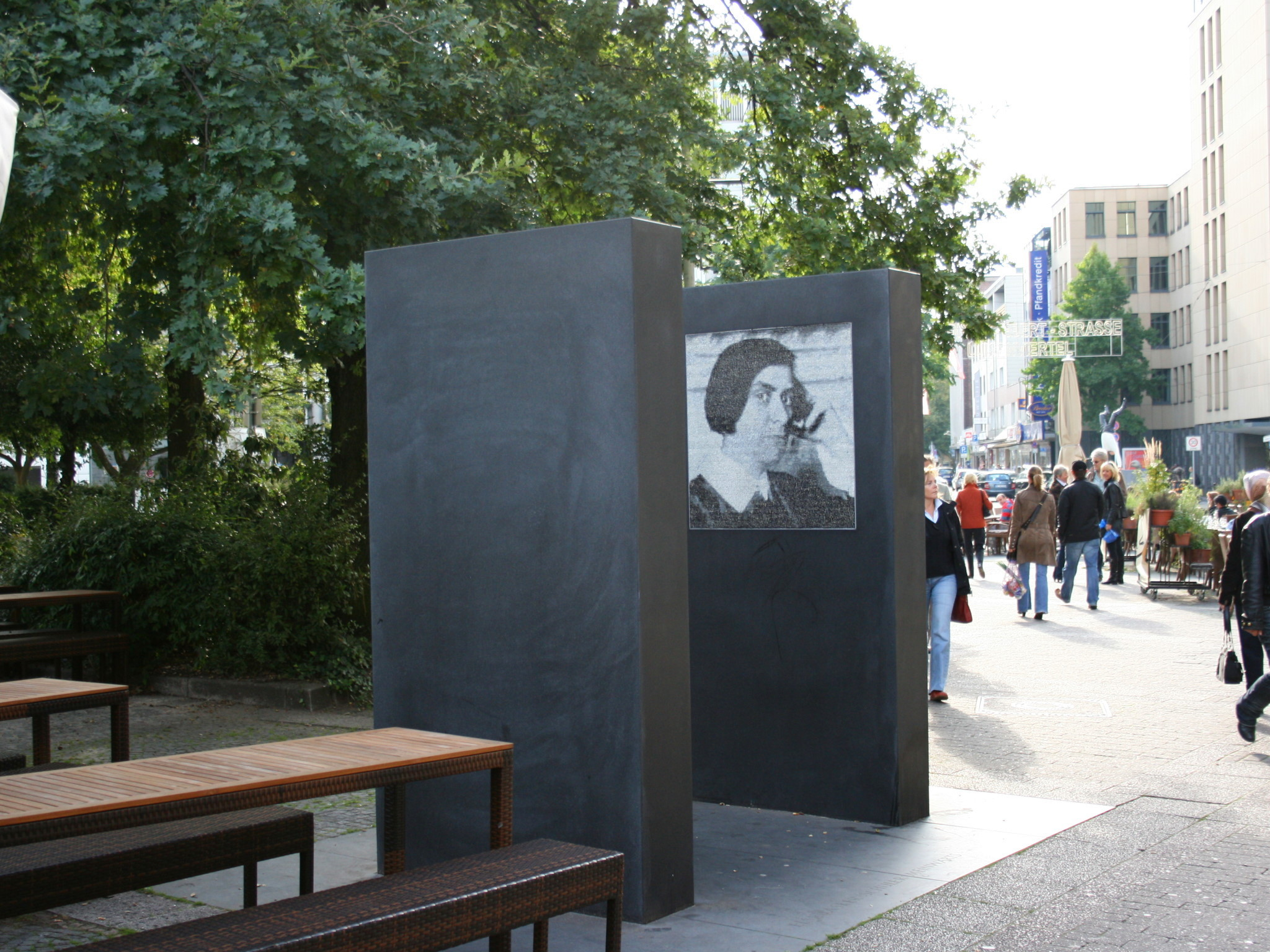
Lasker-Schüler memorial by Stephan Huber in Elberfeld, Wuppertal

Lasker-Schüler left behind several volumes of poetry and three plays, as well as many short stories, essays and letters. During her lifetime, her poems were published in various magazines, among them the journal Der Sturm edited by her second husband, and Karl Kraus' literary journal Die Fackel. She also published many anthologies of poetry, some of which she illustrated herself. Examples are:

- Styx (first published volume of poetry, 1902)
- Der siebente Tag (second volume of poetry, 1905)
- Meine Wunder (first edition, 1911)
- Gesammelte Gedichte (complete poetry) (1917)
- Mein blaues Klavier (1943)

Lasker-Schüler wrote her first and most important play, Die Wupper, in 1908. It was published in 1909 and the first performance took place on 27 April 1919 at the Deutsches Theater in Berlin.

A large part of her work is composed of love poetry, but there are also deeply religious poems and prayers. Transitions between the two are often quite fluid. Her later work is particularly rich in biblical and oriental motifs. Lasker-Schüler was very free with regard to the external rules of poetic form, however her works thereby achieve a greater inner concentration. She was also not averse to linguistic neologisms.

A good example of her poetic art is her 1910 poem "Ein alter Tibetteppich" (lit. "An old Tibetan rug"), which was reprinted many times after its first publication in Der Sturm, the first of these being in Fackel.

"Ein alter Tibetteppich"

Deine Seele, die die meine liebet,
Ist verwirkt mit ihr im Teppichtibet.

Strahl in Strahl, verliebte Farben,
Sterne, die sich himmellang umwarben.

Unsere Füße ruhen auf der Kostbarkeit,
Maschentausendabertausendweit.

Süßer Lamasohn auf Moschuspflanzenthron,
Wie lange küßt dein Mund den meinen wohl
Und Wang die Wange buntgeknüpfte Zeiten schon?

Translation:

"An old Tibetan rug"

Your soul, which loveth mine,
Is woven with it into a Tibetan-rug.

Strand by strand, enamoured colours,
Stars that courted each other across the length of heavens.

Our feet rest on the treasure
Stitches-thousands-and-thousands-across.

Sweet lama-son on your musk-plant-throne
How long has your mouth been kissing mine,
And cheek to cheek colorfully woven times?

== Influence ==
The 20th-century Scottish poet Hugh MacDiarmid included a translation of an extract from Lasker-Schüler's work in his long poem A Drunk Man Looks at the Thistle, 1926. (Lines 401–410.) German composers Margarete Schweikert and Luise Schulze-Berghof set Lasker-Schuler's poems to music.

== Commemoration ==
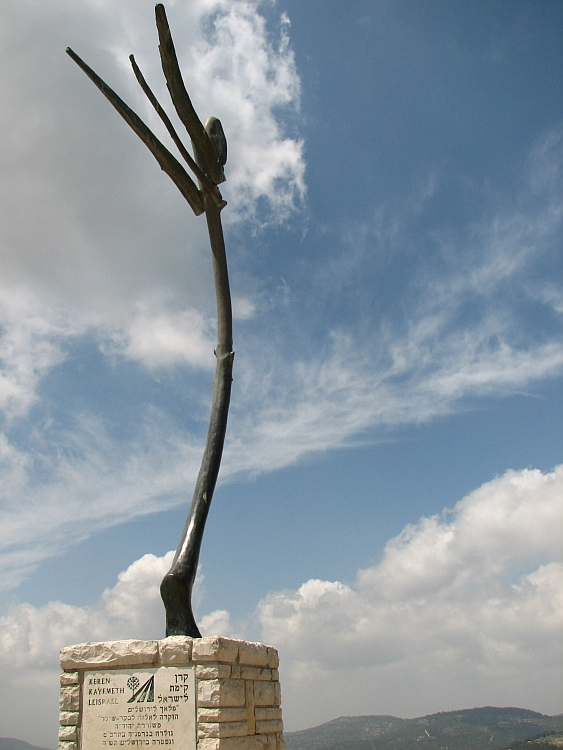
Angel for Jerusalem (1997), Else Lasker-Schüler Memorial in Jerusalem Forest, April 2007 (stolen in July 2007)

There is a memorial plaque to Else Lasker-Schüler at Motzstraße 7, Berlin-Schöneberg, where she lived from 1924 to 1933. Part of this street was renamed Else-Lasker-Schüler-Straße in 1996. In Elberfeld in Wuppertal there is now a school named after her (The "School without Racism"), and a memorial stele was erected on Herzogstraße, Wuppertal.

Composer Lily Reiff (1866-1958) used Lasker-Schüler‘s text in her composition Drei Lieder.

The Else-Lasker-Schüler-Society was founded 1990 in Wuppertal by journalist Hajo Jahn. In more than 20 international symposia from Breslau to Tel Aviv, the works of the poet were introduced and discussed in relation to the relevance for the presence and future.

In 2001, an asteroid, (20074) Laskerschueler was named after her.

In Jerusalem, there is a small street named for Else Lasker-Schüler in the neighborhood of Nayot – Rehov Else. Perched on a ridge in the Jerusalem Forest, very close to the Kennedy Memorial (Yad Kennedy), was a sculpture in her honor resembling a slender tree trunk with wings. It was placed there in 1997, and was stolen, probably by metal thieves, in July 2007.

In 2007, her final days in Jerusalem were commemorated in the BBC radio play My Blue Piano by the Scottish playwright Marty Ross (Radio 4 2007) which combined the facts of her dying days with the fantasies of her inner life.

On 7 February 2020, Google celebrated her with a Google Doodle.

== Film ==
- Ich räume auf ("Putting Things Straight") Germany 1979, German actress Gisela Stein plays the part of Else Lasker-Schüler fighting against her editors. The film was first broadcast by: Westdeutscher Rundfunk Köln, director: Georg Brintrup
- Mein Herz – niemandem! (1997) by Helma Sanders-Brahms features Lena Stolze as the poet. It climaxes with the paradox of her deep bond with Gottfried Benn, an acclaimed poet and physician, who publicly supported the Nazi regime even as Lasker-Schüler was forced into exile.

== Translations into English ==
=== Poetry ===
- Boland, Eavan, ed. (2004). After Every War: Twentieth-Century Women Poets. (translations and introductions). Princeton, New Jersey: Princeton University Press. ISBN 978-0-691-11745-4. OCLC 424103356. Translated poems from nine poets including Lasker-Schüler.
- Star in my Forehead: Selected Poems. Translated by Janine Canan. Duluth, MN: Holy Cow! Press. 2000. ISBN 978-0-930100-88-9. OCLC 43114305.
- Hebrew Ballads and Other Poems. Audri Durchslag and Jeanette Litman-Demeestère (translations and introduction), Yehuda Amichai (preface). Philadelphia: The Jewish Publication Society of America. 1980. ISBN 978-0-8276-0179-6. OCLC 848192782. Claimed to be the first publication of translations in English.
- Selected Poems. Audri Durchslag-Litt and Jeanette Litman-Demeestère (translations and introduction). Los Angeles: Green Integer. 2002. ISBN 978-1-892295-86-6. OCLC 50565214.
- Poems. Nini Ettlinger (translations) and Josef Herman (illustrations). Shropshire: Tern Press. 1980. OCLC 9838607.
- Offering. II : selected poems of Else Lasker-Schüler & more of Rainer Maria Rilke. Bernhard Frank (translations). Buffalo, NY: Goldengrove Press. 2002. OCLC 50672055.
- My Blue Piano. Brooks Haxton (translations and notes). Syracuse University Press. 2015. ISBN 978-0-8156-3420-1. OCLC 922220048. Bilingual edition.
- Your Diamond Dreams Cut Open My Arteries. Robert P. Newton (translations and introduction). University of North Carolina Press. 1982. ISBN 978-0-8078-8100-2. OCLC 906403110.

=== Prose ===
- My Heart. Translated by Sheldon Gilman and Robert Levine. Jakob Hessing (introduction). Amsterdam: November Editions. 2016. ISBN 978-94-92027-07-8. OCLC 964452933. Translation of the novel Mein Herz.
- Concert. Translated by Jean M. Snook. University of Nebraska Press. 1994. ISBN 978-0-8032-2900-6. OCLC 742589376. Translation of Konzert.

=== Plays ===
- Three plays: Dark river, Arthur Aronymus and His Ancestors, and I and I. Jane Curtis (translation) and Inca Molina Rumold (introduction). Northwestern University Press. 2005. ISBN 978-0-8101-2198-0. OCLC 58985776. Translations of Die Wupper, Arthur Aronymus : die Geschichte meines Vaters, and Ich und ich: Ein nachgelassenes Schaauspiel.
