= Palestrina - Prince of Music =

2009 music film

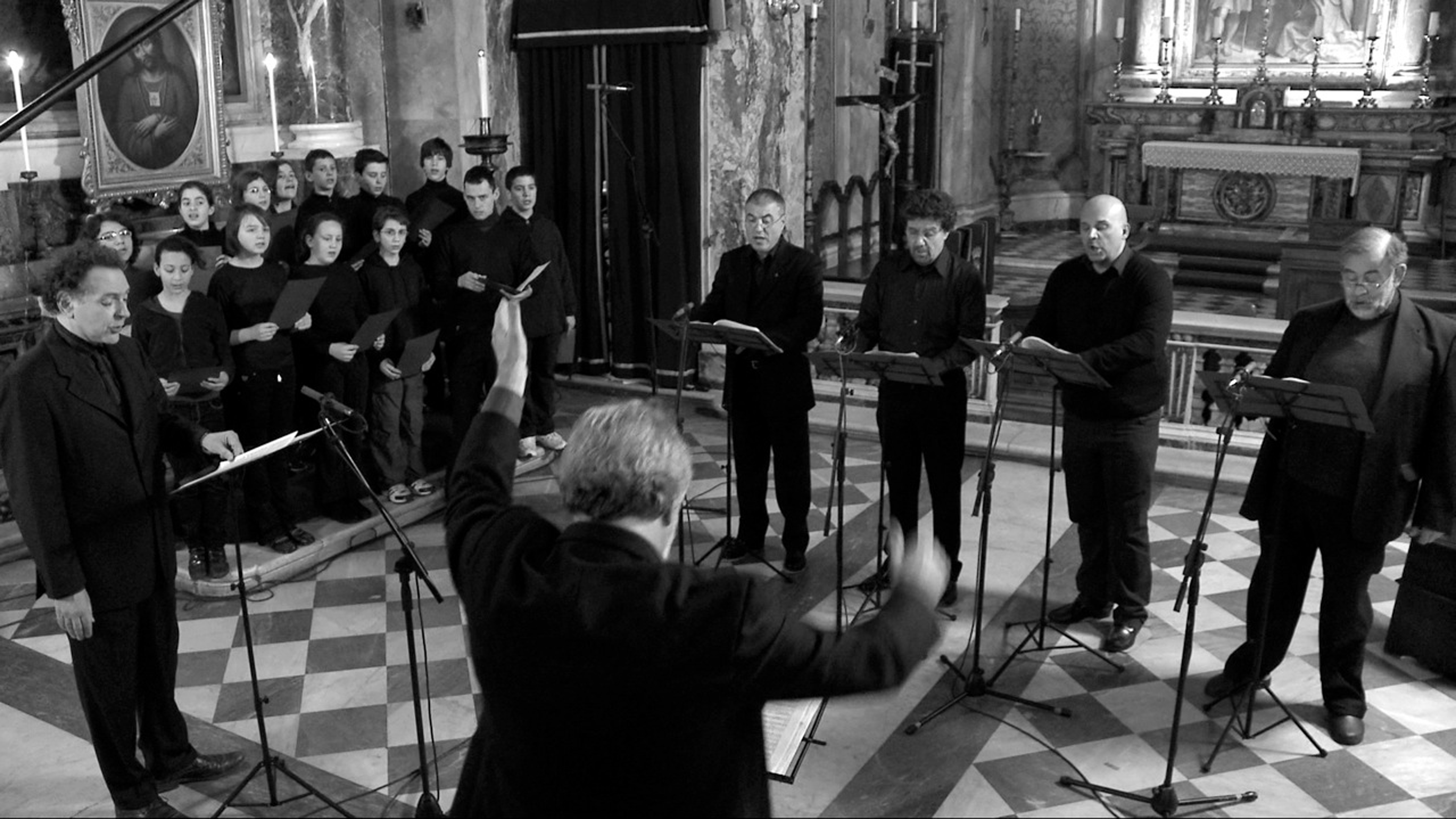
- Flavio Colusso directing the Polyphonic Chorus
- Directed by: Georg Brintrup
- Written by: Georg Brintrup
- Produced by: Christopher Janssen; Arte
- Starring: Renato Scarpa; Remo Remotti; Giorgio Colangeli; Franco Nero
- Cinematography: Paolo Scarfó; Benny Hasenclever; Oliver Kochs
- Edited by: Georg Brintrup
- Music by: Giovanni Pierluigi da Palestrina
- Release date: 15 November 2009 (Parco della Musica)
- Running time: 52 minutes
- Countries: Italy; Germany
- Language: Italian

Palestrina - Prince of Music is an Italian/German 2009 music film directed by Georg Brintrup. The subject is the life and music of Giovanni Pierluigi da Palestrina (ca.1525-1594), a famous 16th-century Italian Renaissance composer of sacred music, which is included in the Roman School. Filmed in March 2009 on locations mainly in and around L'Aquila and Rome, most of the ancient buildings and historical interiors in the city of L'Aquila were destroyed by the 2009 L'Aquila earthquake, only a few days after the end of shooting. Palestrina’s music in the film is directed by Flavio Colusso and the Roman Ensemble Seicentonovecento. The film was also titled The Liberation of Music or Die Befreiung der Musik when released in Germany.

== Plot ==
The film dramatises Palestrina's life across two intertwined timelines: the Renaissance and the present day. In the contemporary setting, a choir and its director, explore the works of Giovanni Pierluigi da Palestrina using fictionalised post-1594 interviews from his son, students, clergy, and peers. In the Renaissance setting the film traces Palestrina's appointment by Pope Julius III, subsequent political setbacks under Pope Paul IV, personal grief from losing family to the plague, and his marriage to a wealthy widow which enabled him to self-publish his music.

The film starts with the death of Giovanni Pierluigi da Palestrina in 1594. Afterwards his son, Iginio, some of his students and colleagues, members of the Cappella Giulia (Julian Chapel) at St. Peter's Basilica, and also members of the Roman clergy give their personal statements or testimony on Palestrina’s life and career: from his childhood, when he is trained as a choir-boy in the circle of the "Roman School" of polyphony founded by Costanzo Festa.

The narrative highlights Giovanni Palestrina's navigation of the Council of Trent's church reforms. By pioneering a new polyphonic approach (genus novus) - most notably in his Missa Papae Marcelli - he shapes the trajectory of European sacred music.

At the height of his career, Giovanni Palestrina is struck a devastating blow by fate: amidst wars and famine, an outbreak of plague and influenza claims the lives of his two eldest sons, followed by his wife. Overcome with despair, the artist falls into a profound depression; he ceases to compose music. However, strength of will and ambition drive him to take control of his life once more, to alter his plans, and to marry again – this time to the wealthy widow of a fur merchant – finally providing him with the funds needed to publish his works independently. In just a few years he brings 16 books to print, leaving behind a musical and artistic legacy that continues to fascinate us to this day.

== Cast ==
- Domenico Galasso as Iginio
- Renato Scarpa as Monsignore Cotta
- Remo Remotti as Philip Neri
- Giorgio Colangeli as L. Barré
- Stefano Oppedisano as Annibale
- Claudio Marchione as Cristoforo
- Achille Brugnini as Giacchino
- Franco Nero as D. Ferrabosco
- Pasquale di Filippo as G. Severini
- Bartolomeo Giusti as old Palestrina
- Daniele Giuliani as young Palestrina
- Patrizia Bellezza as Virginia Dormuli
- Francesca Catenacci as Lucrezia Gori

== Release and reception ==
Palestrina - Prince of Music premiered at the Auditorium Parco della Musica in Rome on November 15, 2009 It was then shown at "Prix International du Documentaire e du Reportage Mediterraneen" - 15th edition, at the 11th International Television Festival ECO, Ohrid Macedonia, at AsoloArtFilmfestival, at Golden Prague International Television Festival 2010, at L´Aquila International Film Festival, L´Aquila Italy 2010, and at FIFA (Festival international du film sur l'art), Montreal, Canada 2011.
