= Poems of Asolo =

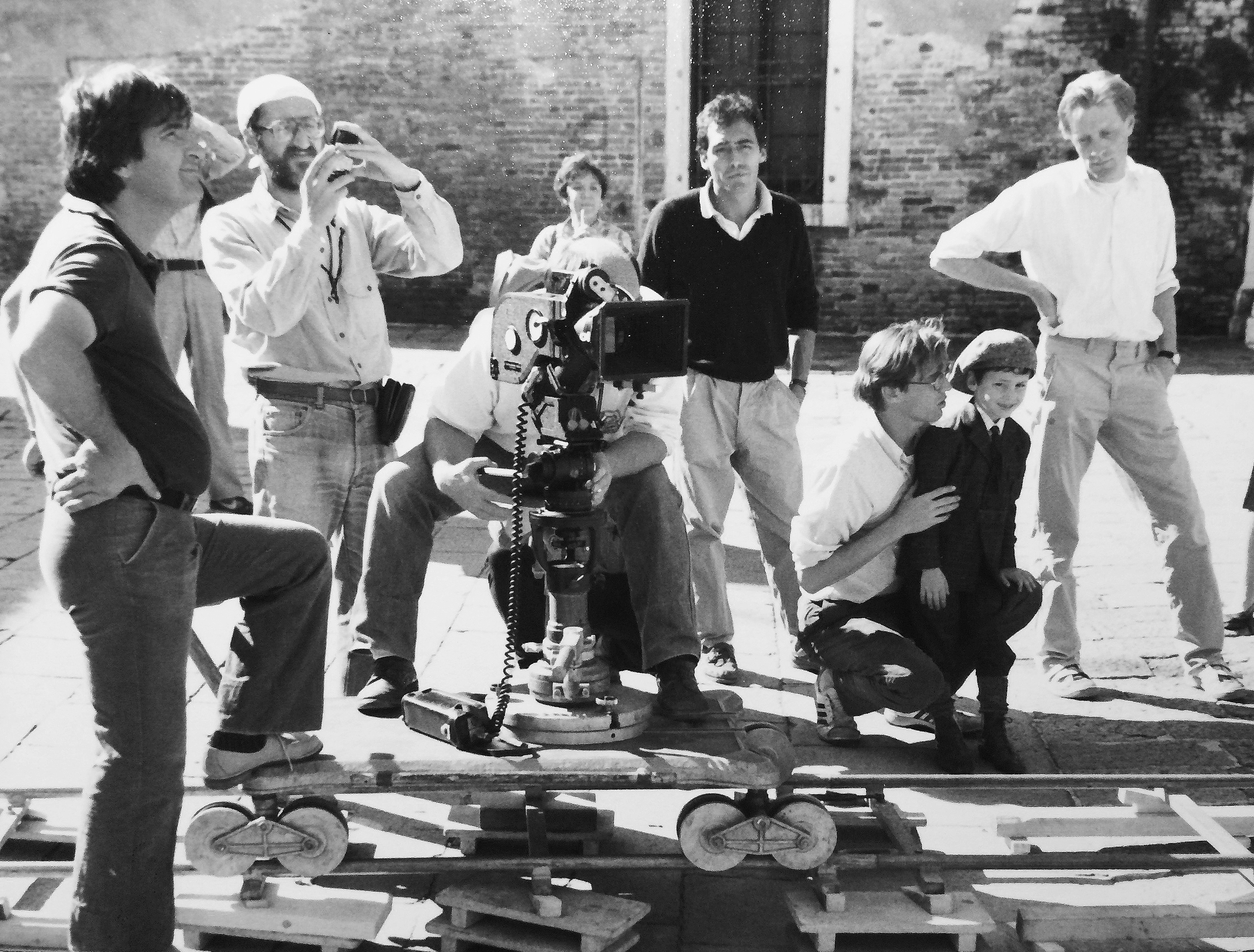
- Film staff while shooting "Poems of Asolo"
- Directed by: Georg Brintrup
- Written by: Georg Brintrup
- Produced by: WDR, Cologne, Brintrup Filmproduktion
- Starring: Philippe Nahoun; Mario Perazzini; Lucia Casagrande; Paola Guccione; Alessandro Bertorello
- Cinematography: Emilio Bestetti
- Edited by: Carlo Carlotto; Georg Brintrup
- Music by: Gian Francesco Malipiero; Igor Stravinsky
- Release dates: 20 April 1985 (Italy); 5 October 1985 (Germany)
- Running time: 60 min
- Countries: Germany; Italy
- Language: German/Italian

Poems of Asolo (Italian title: “Poemi Asolani”) is a 1985 German-Italian biographical film about the Italian music composer Gian Francesco Malipiero, directed by Georg Brintrup.

== Plot ==
"Poems of Asolo" (Poemi Asolani) is also the title of a musical composition by Gian Francesco Malipiero, who was born in Venice but lived most of his life in Asolo, a small town in the Veneto region. The film offers a portrait of the composer and the town he chose as his favorite place to live. Like a “musical with no singing” the film features instrumental music and a narrator. The broken voice of old Malipiero (actor: Heinz Kreuger) delivers an inner monologue which covers the most interesting stages of a life entirely lived by the motto: “I have constantly, inevitably, rejected and destroyed whatever was the outcome of my will instead of my intuition.”

It seems that the real protagonist of the film is Malipiero's music. Each shot and scene have its own precise number of bars or musical notes. The action and the camera movements are arranged to the rhythm of the musical compositions. Environmental noises are often at the origin of Malipiero's music. In the film, in fact, these noises have the same value as the music. The volume of the direct sound is always kept at the same level as the music.

== Cast ==
- Philippe Nahoun – young Malipiero
- Mario Perazzini – old Malipiero
- Alessandro Bertorello –Malipiero as a child
- Paola Guccione – Malipieros mother
- Lucia Casagrande – Malipieros first wife
- Pino Costalunga – friend of Malipiero
- Giovanni Todescato – friend of Malipiero
- Roberto Giglio – friend of Malipiero / mask
- Roberto Cuppone – friend of Malipiero / mask
- Mauro Sassaro – friend of Malipiero / mask
- Giuliana Barbaro – mask
- Gino Gorini – pianist

== Soundtrack ==
The film's soundtrack is made up of musical compositions by Malipiero, except for one piece by Igor Stravinsky:

- San Francesco d'Assisi, mistero per soli, coro e orchestra (1920–1921, New York 1922)
- La bottega da caffè (1926)
- Impressioni dal vero (il capinero) (1910)
- Impressioni dal vero (il chiù) (1910)
- Le sacre du printemps di Igor Stravinsky (1913)
- Impressioni dal vero (il picchio) (1915)
- Poemi asolani (1916)
- Pause del silenzio I, (1917); II Sul fiume del tempo, L'esilio dell'eroe, Il grillo cantarino, (1925–1926)
- Quartetto per archi n.1 "Rispetti e strambotti" (1920)
- Sinfonia n. 1 "In quattro tempi, come le quattro stagioni" (1933)
- Sinfonia n. 6 "Degli archi" (1947)
- L'Orfeide (1919–1922, Düsseldorf 1925), in tre parti:

- I "La morte delle maschere",
- II "Sette canzoni",

- Sinfonia n. 7 "Delle canzoni" (1948)

== Release and reception ==
“Poems of Asolo” was first shown at the 1985 “Salso Film & TV Festival” in Salsomaggiore, as well as at the 1985 Prix Italia. The film was also shown at the “Festival Internazionale d’Oriolo” on 24 July 1986, where it won for best photography.,
