= Francesco Malipiero =

Italian composer

Francesco Malipiero (9 January 1824 – 12 May 1887) was an Italian composer. He was the father of conductor and pianist Luigi Malipiero and the grandfather of composer and musicologist Gian Francesco Malipiero. Trained in Venice, he composed a large number of operas; many of which premiered at La Fenice. He also wrote several symphonic works, sacred songs, chamber music, and art songs.

== Selected works ==
- Giovanna prima Regina di Napoli (1841)
- Alberigo da Romano (1846)
- Fernando Cortez (1851)
