= Drums and Gods =

2001 German/Brazilian film

- Directed by: Georg Brintrup
- Written by: Georg Brintrup
- Produced by: Rudolf Heinemann; Georg Brintrup, Rome; WDR, Cologne; TVE Brasil, Salvador Bahia; Lichtspiel Filmproduktion GmbH
- Starring: Vinícius Nascimento; Cristóvão da Silva; Caetano Veloso; Virginia Rodrigues
- Cinematography: Joaquim Waldyr Dal Moro, Jorge Alvis
- Edited by: Jorge Alvis
- Release dates: 22 September 2001 (Brazil); 13 January 2002 (Germany)
- Running time: 60 minutes
- Country: Brazil
- Language: Portuguese

Drums and Gods is a 2001 German/Brazilian film directed by Georg Brintrup.

== Plot ==
A Brazilian street boy, Antônio, wakes up early in the morning on the beach of Salvador (Bahia). At sunrise, he is overtaken by strange thoughts: The bible says that God created light even before the sun and the stars. Light, but not sunlight! Maybe the light is the light within our interior enlightenment. Nature's biggest catastrophe is when man began to think. However, before God created light, he said: “Let there be light!” So, before light there was the voice of God. A sound ... a big bang ... the sound of thunder ... rolling off a drum. Only this thunder had the power to create light. If it weren't for that sound from the depths, that primal noise, today man wouldn't be able to think.

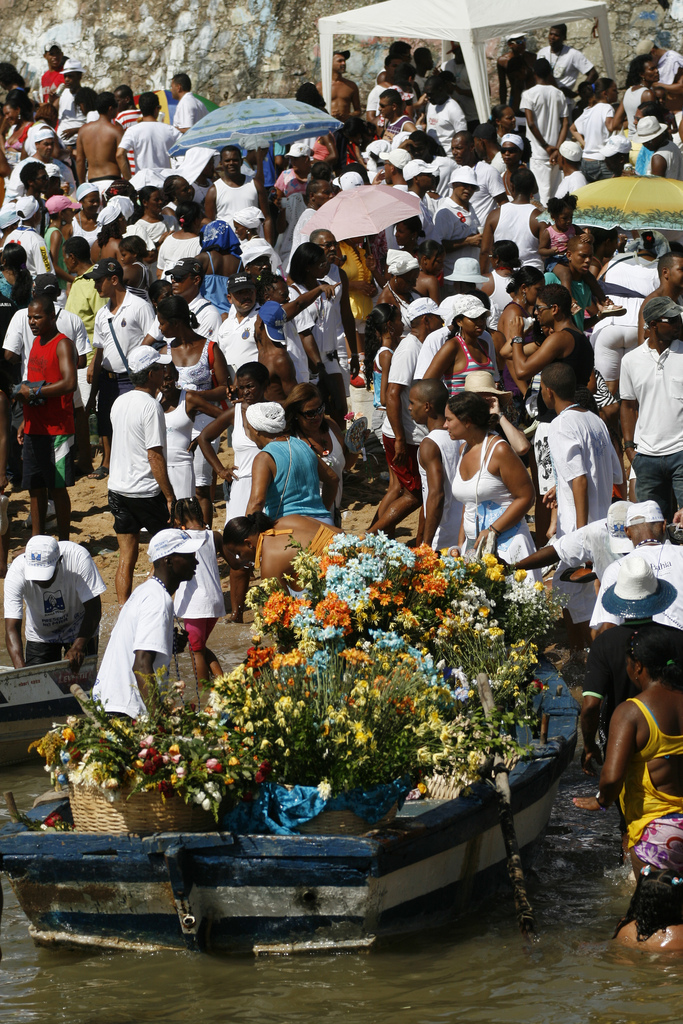
Offerings for lemanjá in Salvador, Brazil.

Antônio meets Valdyr, a blind black man who sees with his ears. The two become friends. Valdyr knows that man has lost his naturalness by thinking. Man gave a name to everything ... with words ... man gave sense to everything around him. For man, the whole world was changed and consequently his problems began. As this spirit invaded man, his inner peace was gone and violence appeared. This is why all men are striving to find that peace again and to recapture that primal wholeness. But how? They try to communicate with the Gods using a sound, similar to the primordial sound. In Brazil they use an instrument: the drum!

Antônio and Valdyr roam through the city of Salvador (Bahia) searching for this primordial sound. (Salvador is also known as “Black Rome” because of its cultural Afro-religious traditions). Along the way, they meet various drummers and learn that the drum is the oldest instrument that man used to communicate with the Gods. The drum calls the Gods. These descend and connect with humans. God and man become one again, one sound. At this point, understanding and reason no longer play a role. He, who understands the world only with his head, lives his life only half way. A man who thinks that he can rule the world with just his head creates danger for himself.

In the noisy carnival hustle and bustle, where nothing follows reason but rather emotion, Antônio senses a strange tension between his head and his stomach, which keeps him from staying calm. Valdyr shows him that this tension is important. There is the same tension between the stretched skin of a drum and the sound that it makes. If the skin is not tightly stretched, the drum cannot make any sound. Antônio realizes that inside we have to be stretched like a drum skin in order to make sound, to become sound ourselves. “We too are instruments. And we have to always be playing.”

== Cast ==
- Vinícius Nascimento: Antônio
- Cristóvão da Silva: Valdyr
- Virginia Rodrigues: Sadness
- Caetano Veloso: Himself
- Edlo Mendes: Conqueror
- Ipojucan Dias: Native Brazilian
- Miller Fragoso: Sailor
- Paolo Ferreira: Sailor
- Fernando Lopes: Dancer
- Antônia Ribeiro da Silva: Goddess Oxum
- Vera Passos: Dancer
- Leonardo Luz: Dancer

== Production ==
„When man began to think, at that moment began the most magnificent, the most monstrous of all natural disasters.“ This sentence and other theses from the book "South American meditations" by Baltic German philosopher Hermann von Keyserling form one of the basis of the filmic essay. Brintrup was also influenced by Stefan Zweig's book “Brazil, Land of the Future” in this film essay.

The Italian composer Aldo Brizzi took over the musical direction of the film. The songs of his album "Brizzi do Brazil", written for Brazilian and Portuguese singers, were recorded during the filming of the movie. Brintrup integrated parts of these songs into the film, including "Mistero di Afrodite", by Caetano Veloso.

== Soundtrack ==
Major drumming groups from Salvador Bahia perform in the film: Kissukila, Terra em Transe, Swingue do Pelò, Banda Percussão do Bairro da Paz. The film's Soundtrack is also made up of excerpts from the following musical compositions:

| Titolo | Compositore | Opera | Performer |
|---|---|---|---|
| 1. | Aldo Brizzi | Earth Heat | Terra em Transe |
| 2. | unknown | Yemanjá | Virginia Rodrigues |
| 3. | Aldo Brizzi | Mistero di Afrodite | Caetano Veloso |
| 4. | Aldo Brizzi | Poetique de la relation | Terra em Transe |
| 5. | unknown | Eligebo | Virginia Rodrigues |
| 6. | Aldo Brizzi | Terre Mer | Terra em Transe |
| 7. | Arnaldo Antunes | O Corpo | Arnaldo Antunes |
| 8. | Aldo Brizzi | Barravento | Terra em Transe |
| 9. | Arnaldo Antunes | O Silêncio | Arnaldo Antunes |
| 10. | Synval Silva | Adeus, Batucada | Virginia Rodrigues |

== Release and reception ==
The World Premiere of the film Drums and Gods (Tambores e Deuses) was on 22 September 2001 in the “Teatro di ICBA”, Salvador da Bahia. The film was the first co-production between German WDR and Brazilian TVB, where it was broadcast on 29 September 2001. The German television station WDR’s broadcast of this film was on 13 January 2002.

The film presents an astute vision of Brazil, both critical and rational. The film studies not only the Brazilian way of being, but also a universal, human one. It is an anthropological study, mixed with philosophical and sociological ideas. However, these ideas would not be sufficient as a prerequisite for an artistic work. The film casts a European gaze on our country which is guided by the magic of music, dance and landscape. The film also explores the openness of our language and the earthly rites of the locals.

— Programme booklet at the world premiere at Teatro ICBA in Salvador de Bahia on 22. September 2001

For several years now, German filmmaker Georg Brintrup has been exploring the interrelationship between sound and image in his works. Author of the films 'Symphonia Colonialis' (1991) and 'O trem caipira' (1994), both about Brazilian music, he now expands on the same subject in 'Tambores e Deuses' (Drums and Gods), which he is now shooting in Salvador. (...) In the considerable list of his works for television, cinema and radio, Brintrup places the most emphasis on the works that deal with music and people's relationship to sound, to noises and to hearing themselves. “A sound is stronger than a picture can ever be”, the filmmaker states, justifying his attitude which might seem contradictory for someone who is actually dependent on the image. However, he sets himself the task of building a bridge from one language to another, from sound to image, from hearing to seeing.

— Cyntia Nogueira in Correio da Bahia, Folha da Bahia, p. 7 on 7 March 2001
