= A Ray of Sun =

- Directed by: Georg Brintrup
- Written by: Georg Brintrup
- Produced by: Brintrup Filmproduktion; José Montes-Baquer; WDR, Cologne; HR, Frankfurt; RAI, Rome
- Starring: Paolo Picardi; Renato Scarpa; Rossana Piano
- Cinematography: Luigi Verga; Eva Piccoli
- Edited by: Jorge Alvis
- Release date: January 5, 1997
- Running time: 57 minutes
- Countries: Italy; Germany
- Languages: Italian, German, English

A Ray of Sun (original title: Ein Sonnenstrahl) (1997) is a biographical film by German filmmaker Georg Brintrup on the life of Roman film music composer Renzo Rossellini and his brother Roberto Rossellini, one of the prominent film directors of the Italian neorealist cinema.

== Plot ==
The film begins with the scrolling title: “Two brothers go through life together. The older one finds a new way to represent reality in film. The younger one expresses this film reality in music. At a mature age both brothers become aware of the shortcomings that limited their arts. From this they draw a conclusion each one in his own way.” The main title “A Ray of Sun” is followed by the static title: “Renzo and Roberto Rossellini – Two Brothers on their Journey towards the Unknown“. The film in the English version is narrated by Edmund Purdom. Very soon, however, we realize that the narration is an inner monologue of Renzo Rossellini himself, who is recalling memories of his life:

Renzo grows up in the shadow of his older brother Roberto: "Roberto had me as his friend and toy: I had him as my companion and despot." The two are inseparable: Roberto the tyrant and Renzo the victim. While Roberto, restless, aggressive and strong-willed, becomes a young man full of charm, Renzo, more quiet and submissive, cultivates a humble and accommodating nature.

In the Rome of the 1910s, the two brothers, inspired by their grandfather, soon come into contact with music and cinema. Maestro Sallustio, specialist in piano accompaniment for silent action films, becomes Renzo's first music teacher. The young man, not yet eighteen, starts to compose and with one of those rare strokes of luck succeeds in publishing his first work by the famous publishing house Casa Ricordi: "La fontana ammalata" (The Sick Fountain). The teaching of some composer friends of his father, such as Ottorino Respighi and Pietro Mascagni, also influence his musical style.

After the death of their father, Renzo dedicates himself to the composition of chamber music and symphonies and begins to teach in various conservatories. Roberto, on the other hand, becomes a filmmaker "out of spite and self-love". He falls in love, in fact, with a well-known young actress and decides to marry her at any cost. She, however, after a successful film, ends up marrying the director of the film. For Roberto it is a very painful separation. Renzo follows his brother and abandons his profession as a teacher for the more lucrative profession of a film music composer.

In the early 1940s, the Rossellinis work on a trilogy of documentaries for the film department of the Italian Navy. Their intent is not to oppose reality, but to represent it in such a way that it itself becomes spectacular. Both, in America as in Europe, Film Music still reflects the passionate romanticism of the 19th century, awakening tearful feelings in the audience and leaving room for illusions. This, in Renzo's opinion, did not help portray reality. "For us, directly involved in war actions, there was not much room for illusions."

In 1943, with the film "Rome, Open City", they achieve their first great success. Italian cinema had miraculously risen from the ruins of war. Roberto is baptized the inventor of Italian neo-realism. The two brothers, however, have doubts: "Theories of any kind are a limitation and do not nourish freedom of expression. And we really had no need of these." They know that in order to rediscover man, you have to be humble, you have to see him as he really is, not as you would like him to be according to ideologies.

Roberto and Renzo continued to collaborate on several other Italian films, working on the relationship between image and music in their film scores.

At this time Hollywood stagnates in a crisis without precedent: production crises, actors’ crises, crises of ideas. Ingrid Bergman falls in love with Rossellini's films. She comes to Italy to join the brothers and makes seven films with them. These become films of success which produced by Roberto, without a studio, without an industrial plant. This only aggravates the crisis in Hollywood ... and also increases interest in demolishing Roberto's reputation.

After years of fruitful collaboration, Ingrid Bergman and Roberto separate. Renzo continues to compose music for other films but, since he refuses compromise, a fracture is soon created between him and the world of cinema. During this time, Roberto wants to see him and talk to him, as he had always done in the grave moments of their lives. Roberto is going through a creative crisis that is destroying him inside. Certain work conditions are mortifying for him. He confesses that he wanted to give up directing films. If he got back behind the camera, it wouldn't be to produce commercial films but to learn something new and to free men from their ignorance. "The important thing is to inform, the important thing is to instruct, but to educate is not important." He believes that cinema has failed its mission to be the art of the 20th century.

From then on, Roberto shoots documentaries and television films. Renzo dedicates himself to the composition of operas. At a late age they learn that "all of the suffering that we are called to endure disappear into nothing. Because, in fact, the balance of our life ends with nothing of consequence. But the most surprising reality is the following: that the world is actually something other than what we, Roberto and me, thought it was and for which we were, both of us called upon to give our contribution. It is a great tragedy that this world is completely unknown to us, because it is made outside of us, while we unawares were busy constructing that which we thought was our world."

== Cast ==
- Paolo Picardi: Renzo Rossellini
- Edmund Purdom: voice of Renzo Rossellini
- Marco Abeni: Renzo Rossellini as a child
- Carlo Abeni: Roberto Rossellini as a child
- Mauro Fontani: father (Giovanni Rossellini)
- Rossana Piano: mother (Elettra Belan)
- Roberto Diano: grandfather
- Vito Pondini: Roberto
- Renato Scarpa: Giacinto Sallustio
- Jobst Grapow: Tito Ricordi
- Michele Mancini: segretario

== Production ==
The reconstruction of Rossellini’s life in this biographical film is based on autobiographical writings by the Rossellini brothers and interviews between Georg Brintrup and Renzo Rossellini's wife, Anita.

== Soundtrack ==
The Soundtrack is composed by Renzo Rossellini's music from the following films:

Number	Title	By	Year
1.	Il signor Max	Mario Camerini	1937
2.	A Pilot Returns	Roberto Rossellini	1942
3.	Rome, Open City	Roberto Rossellini	1945
4.	Paisà	Roberto Rossellini	1946
5.	Germania anno zero	Roberto Rossellini	1948
6.	L'Amore (segment: "Il Miracolo")	Roberto Rossellini	1948
7.	Stromboli terra di Dio	Roberto Rossellini	1950
8.	Europa '51	Roberto Rossellini	1952
9.	Viaggio in Italia	Roberto Rossellini	1953
10.	La paura	Roberto Rossellini	1954
11.	Vanina Vanini	Roberto Rossellini	1961

In addition, the film's soundtrack includes musical excerpts, in part recorded ex novo, from the following works by Renzo Rossellini:

1. Stati d’Animo, 1952
2. Vangelo minimo, 1957
3. Roma cristiana, 1940
4. La fontana malata, 1925
5. Stampe della vecchia Roma, 1937
6. Diagramma No. 1, 1953
7. La Guerra, 1956

The piece La fontana ammalata is interpreted by the Giovani Musicisti Italiani under the direction of Federico Romano Capalbi.

== Release and reception ==
"A Ray of Sun" was first broadcast on WDR on January 5, 1997. Later it was broadcast on German-language public service television channel 3sat and on HR. The original Italian version was shown on RAI in May 1998. RD Studio, Paris, distributed the film in 1998, then the French distributor Point du Jour International took over the film and sold it in a dozen countries from Canada to Australia.

"Ray of Sun" tells the story of the two Rossellini brothers as seen through the eyes of Renzo, the musician.

Roberto Rossellini's career is well publicised. Renzo is far less known by the general public although he composed music for the cinema before his brother even began shooting his first films. His career as a composer for the cinema began in 1937 with "ll Signor Max" by Mario Camerini. "La Nave Bianca" in 1941 marked the beginning of his collaboration with Roberto, followed by those legendary films – "Roma Città Aperta" (Rome, Open City) above all – that lifted the ltalian cinema miraculously out of the post-war ruins. Thus was born what was later referred to as the "ltalian neo-realism" where music had a very clearly defined role.

The film contains extracts of Roberto Rossellini's most celebrated films: "Un Pilota Ritorna", "Rome Open City", "Paisà", "Germany Year Zero", "The Miracle", "Stromboli", "Joumey to ltaly". 1997 commemorates the anniversary of the death of both brothers, who died fifteen and twenty years ago respectively.

— Doris Weitzel in "RD Studio Catalog" (1998) Paris, p. 17
