= Virginia Rodrigues (singer) =

Brazilian singer (born 1964)

Virgínia Rodrigues (born Salvador, Bahia, March 31, 1964) is a Brazilian singer. Her music has an influence of classical music, samba, and jazz, and her lyrics reference Candomblé and Umbanda entities.

== Biography ==
Virgínia Rodrigues was born in Salvador, Bahia on March 31, 1964. She had started her career by singing in both Catholic and Protestant church choirs. In 1997, she was invited by the director Márcio Meirelles to participate in the play Bye Bye Pelô, alongside the Bando de Teatro Olodum. During rehearsals, she discovered by Caetano Veloso.

Her first album Sol Negro (1997) was produced by Celso Fonseca and had arrangements by Eduardo Souto Neto, and the participation of Djavan, Gilberto Gil, and Milton Nascimento. It was released on the Rykodisc label and was well received in the United States and Europe. The Times of London described Rodrigues as "... The new diva of Brazilian music". The album also received good reviews in Le Monde and the magazine Rolling Stone.

Rodrigues second album, Nós (2000), paid homage to the blocos afros of Salvador, featuring songs of Ilê Aiyê, Olodum, Timbalada, Araketu and Afreketê. This album was also well received, with reviews in The New York Times and All-Music Guide.

Her third album, Mares Profundos (2003), was released on the German label Deutsche Grammophon and features 11 African-sambas composed between 1962 and 1966 by guitarist Baden Powell and poet Vinicius de Moraes. The program closes with samba "Lapinha" (Baden-Paulo Cesar Pinheiro).

Her fourth album, Recomeço (2008) was released by Biscoito Fino and features poetry by Chico Buarque.

Rodrigues regularly appears at festivals of jazz and world music throughout the world, participating in several world tours. Former U.S. president Bill Clinton once said that she was the singer who he liked best in the world and mentioned her in his memoir My Life.

== Discography ==
Albums

- Sol Negro (1997)
- Nós (2000)
- Mares Profundos (2003)
- Recomeço (2008)
- Mama Kalunga (2015)
- Cada Voz E Uma Mulher (2019)

Contributing artist

- Unwired: Latin America (2001, World Music Network)

== Filmography ==
Key
†	Denotes films that have not yet been released

Year	Title	Role	Language	Note
1996	Tieta of Agreste	Cantora	Brazil Film	
2001	Drums and Gods	A Tristeza	Brazil Film	
2003	Gregório de Mattos	Cantora de Rua	Brazil Film	Biographical Film.
2007	Ó Paí, Ó	Bioncetão	Brazil Film	
2014	O Casamento de Gorete	Como Raimunda	Brazil Film	
2019	Mahira	Action thriller	Brazil Film	
