= Rispetti e strambotti =

1920 composition by Gian Francesco Malipiero

Rispetti e strambotti is a work for string quartet composed in 1920 by Gian Francesco Malipiero. The piece was first performed on September 25, 1920, in Pittsfield, Massachusetts; it won the Elizabeth Sprague Coolidge Award. The piece takes its title from two early forms of Italian poetry; rispetti were love messages from men to ladies, while strambotti were roundelays. The piece is a single, coherent work meant to depict various aspects of the Renaissance, and is built up of numerous episodic melodic subjects. Among the most significant are those depicting the clergy and peasantry; the former is a sort of plainchant, while the latter is a robust theme with astringent harmonies.
