= Putting Things Straight =

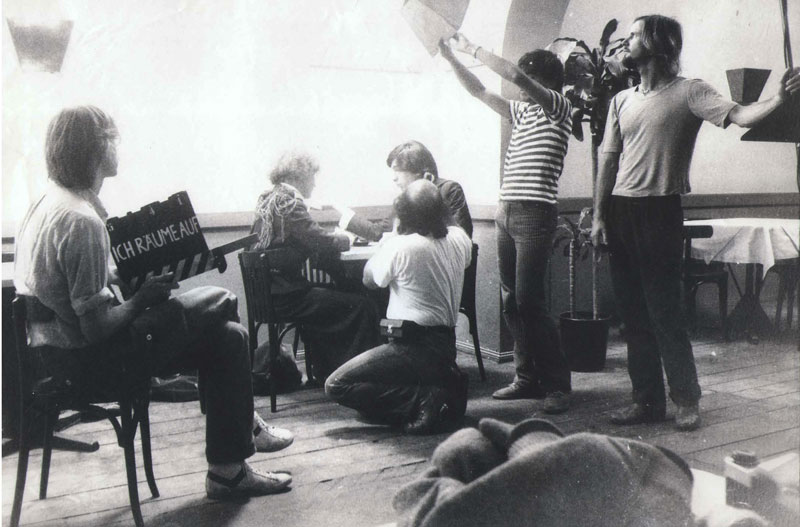
- Film set in Berlin, October 1979
- Directed by: Georg Brintrup
- Written by: Georg Brintrup
- Produced by: Hartmut Bitomsky; Christhardt Burgmann
- Starring: Gisela Stein; Hanns Zischler; Ulrich Gregor; Hans Christoph Buch; Harun Farocki
- Cinematography: Ali Reza Movahed
- Edited by: Carlo Carlotto; Georg Brintrup
- Music by: Arnold Schoenberg; Classical Arabic music
- Release date: 23 December 1979 (Germany)
- Running time: 60 minutes
- Country: Germany
- Language: German

Putting Things Straight (German title: Ich räume auf) is a 1979 film directed and written by Georg Brintrup. It was shot in 16 mm film and was the director's first television release. The script is based on a polemic printed in 1925 ("Ich räume auf - Meine Anklage gegen meine Verleger") by the Jewish German poet Else Lasker-Schüler, the principal woman representative of German Expressionism.

== Premise ==
The film describes a dispute between poet Else Lasker-Schüler and her publishers. The film takes place in Berlin before, during and after World War I. It deals with the rights of the author; quoting from Karl Marx: "a writer is judged as productive not on the amount of ideas he produces, but on the amount of money his publisher is able to profit from his works."

== Cast ==
- Gisela Stein – Else Lasker-Schüler
- Frank Burkner – Paul Cassirer
- Hanns Zischler – Alfred Flechtheim
- Ulrich Gregor – Kurt Wolff
- Hans Christoph Buch – Franz Werfel
- Harun Farocki – Friend of Flechtheim

== Production ==
The film was first broadcast on 23 December 1979, by Westdeutscher Rundfunk. It was then shown at the 1980 International Film Festival Rotterdam.
