= Georg Brintrup =

German film director

- Born: 25 October 1950 (age 75); Münster, Germany
- Occupations: Film director, screenwriter, producer, actor, editor

Georg Brintrup (born 25 October 1950) is a German-Italian film director, screenwriter and producer, known for his non-narrative film essays on poetry and music as well as his biographical films.

== Life and career ==
Georg Brintrup had already made several underground films between the end of the 1960s and the beginning of the 1970s before he started his studies in journalism, the history of art and the Romance languages at the University of Münster. Some of the films he made during this period have been shown at avant-garde theater productions in Münster.

In 1973, he started his studies in film and communication sciences at the I.S.O.P. in Rome. Part of his thesis entitled "Literature in Films" (1975) was his short film My miracles, seven poems by Else Lasker-Schüler, which was shown during the International Short Film Festival Oberhausen in 1978 in German. In 1975 he made his first film essay as an independent filmmaker: Rules For a Film about Anabaptists, which was shown in 1977 at the International Film Festival Rotterdam and the Berlin International Film Festival

In 1978 he wrote his first audio play for the SWF radio station in Baden-Baden. This special form of an audio play is in the tradition of the "acoustical film" by Max Ophüls. Sounds, noises, words and music are treated and used equally while recording. To date, Brintrup has written and directed about 30 "acoustical films" for various German radio stations.

In 1979 he made his first film essay for television Putting Things Straight, based on a polemic pamphlet of expressionistic poet Else Lasker-Schüler. The film's topic is the exploitation and corruption of aesthetic productions.

"Poemi Asolani", which tells of the life and work of Italian composer Gian Francesco Malipiero, was made in 1985 and was his first "music film essay". This film has also been described as a "Musical without Songs" and has won several awards. The idea of this "music film essay" was to create a more sophisticated soundtrack with the intention to not manipulate or influence the audience on an emotional or subconscious level, which usually happens in motion pictures, but to give the audience the possibility to apprehend music on a conscious plane, comparable to the estrangement effect in the theatre of Bertold Brecht.

In the 1990s and 2000s Brintrup continued to develop this form of a music film essay. In addition to the Italian music films "Raggio di Sole" and "Luna Rossa" he shot a comprehensive music trilogy in Brazil. The first of these films, "Symphonia Colonialis", deals with the origin of largely unknown Brazilian Baroque Music in Minas Gerais. In the second film, "O Trem Caipira", no word is spoken. "Pure Brazilian" music, from Brasílio Itiberê da Cunha to Heitor Villa-Lobos to Radamés Gnattali, comments on Brazilian everyday life, revealing its own acoustic origins. The third film of the trilogy, "Drums and Gods", penetrates into the musical psyche of the Brazilian. A blind man and a street boy roam the city of Salvador, Bahia in search of the primal sound.

Brintrup's style, his "musical eyes" and "viewing ears" differs greatly from that of other essay filmmakers. Recently Brintrup made the music film essays Palestrina - Prince of Music and Santini's Network, in which the visual illustration of polyphony is given an important role. We can compare eight or twelve independent melodies being played or sung in unison in the films to the course of independent planets which together follow the higher order of gravity in the universe.

Brintrup is a member of the European Film Academy.

== Films (selection) ==
(D = Director, E = Editor, S = Screenplay, P = Production, A = Actor)

- 2013: Santini's Network – (Santini's Netzwerk) - D, E, S
- 2011: Palazzo Ricci - D, E, S
- 2009: Palestrina - Prince of Music – (Palestrina princeps musicae) - D, E, S
- 2004: Summer Music – (Sommer Musik) - D, E, S, P
- 2001-2007: Enzo’s ABC - Enzo Cucchi - D, E, S, P
- 2000: Drums and Gods – (Tambores e Deuses) - D, E, S, P
- 1999: Red Moon over Naples – (Luna Rossa ) - D, S, P
- 1996: A Ray of Sun, Two Brothers on their Journey towards the Unknown, Roberto Rossellini and Renzo Rossellini – D, E, S, P
- 1991: Colonial Symphony – (Symphonia Colonialis) - D, E, S, P
- 1989: Deruta – (Deruta oder Der Stein der Weisen) - D, E, S, P
- 1987: Empedokles film by Straub-Huillet - A
- 1985: Poems of Asolo – (Poemi Asolani - Gian Francesco Malipiero) - D, S, P
- 1984: Klassenverhältnisse film by Straub-Huillet - A
- 1983: Strada Pia a Street in Rome – (Strada Pia) - D, S, P
- 1981: Penn'a Du – (Penn’a Du - The Pennsylvania Dutch) - D, S
- 1979: Putting Things Straight – (Ich räume auf) - D, S
- 1976: Rules For a Film about Anabaptists – (Spielregel für einen Wiedertäuferfilm) - D, S
- 1975: My Miracles – (Meine Wunder) - D, E, S
- 1973: The Park – (Il parco) - D, E, S
