= Corporazione delle Nuove Musiche =

The Corporazione delle Nuove Musiche (Italian: Corporation for new music) was founded in 1923 by Alfredo Casella as a successor organization to his early Società Italiana di Musica Moderna (1917).
