= Celso Fonseca =

- Genres: Música popular brasileira
- Labels: Dubas, Ziriguiboom/Crammed Discs, Six Degrees, EMI Brasil, Universal

Celso Fonseca (born November 15, 1956) is a Brazilian composer, producer, guitarist and singer. He is noted as part of the Música popular brasileira since the 1980s, initially as accompanist and composer, then producer, and since the mid–1990s as an artist in his own right.

Celso Fonseca was born in Rio de Janeiro. He began on guitar at age 12 and by 19 dedicated himself to music as a profession. He counts Baden Powell de Aquino as an influence. In the beginning of the 1980s he worked as guitarist for Gilberto Gil. In 1983 his collaboration with composer Ronaldo Bastos began. Their song “Sorte” was recorded by Gal Costa and Caetano Veloso and later gave the title for Fonsecas second album in 1994. In 1986 he had released a first recording Minha Cara the same year he began to work as a producer for other musicians, debuting with an album by Vinícius Cantuária followed by productions for Gilberto Gil, Gal Costa, Virgínia Rodrigues, Daniela Mercury, Daúde and others. He also worked with Milton Nascimento, Djavan, Adriana Calcanhotto, Bebel Gilberto and many more.

His third collaborative album with Ronaldo Bastos Juventude / Slow Motion Bossa Nova was nominated for two Latin Grammys as Best MPB Album and the song “A Voz do Coração” as Best Brazilian Song. His best-known international releases so far are the two albums he has recorded for Crammed Discs' sublabel Ziriguiboom: Natural (2003) and Rive Gauche Rio (2005).

Fonseca was nominated again in 2016, earning three nominations for the 17th Annual Latin Grammy Awards. The nominations were Song of the Year for "Céu", Best MPB Album for Like Nice and Best Engineered Album, also for Like Nice.

== Discography ==
- Minha Cara (WEA, 1986)
- Sorte (Dubas, 1994) with Ronaldo Bastos
- O Som do Sim (Natasha, 1995)
- with Ronaldo Bastos – Paradiso (Dubas, 1997) with arrangements by Eduardo Souto Neto and Jaques Morelenbaum, and guest vocalist Milton Nascimento
- with Ronaldo Bastos – Juventude / Slow Motion Bossa Nova (Dubas, 2001)
- Natural (Ziriguiboom/Six Degrees, 2003) with guest vocalist Cibelle
- Rive Gauche Rio (Ziriguiboom/Six Degrees, 2005) with guest artist Jorge Drexler
- Feriado (EMI Brazil, 2007)
- Ao Vivo (EMI Brazil, 2008) with guest vocalists Ana Carolina, Gilberto Gil and Roberta Sá
- Página Central (rec. 2007, Biscoito Fino, 2009) with Marcos Valle
- Voz e Violão (Universal, 2010) solo concert recording
- with Ronaldo Bastos – Liebe Paradiso (Dubas/Membran, 2011) with guest vocals by Nana Caymmi, Milton Nascimento, Luiz Melodia a.o.
- No Meu Filme (Universal, 2011)
- Like Nice (Universal, 2015)
- Nossa Musica (Joia Moderna, 2021)
