= Hermann von Kerssenbroch =

German teacher and historian (c. 1520–1585)

Hermann von Kerssenbrock was a German teacher and historian, b. Mönchshof, Barntrup (Lippe), about 1520; d. Osnabrück, 5 July 1585. He attended school first in Paderborn, and after 1533 in Münster until his parents were banished from that city by the Anabaptists. He completed his studies at Cologne, where, in 1541, he received his degree of Bachelor of Philosophy and the Liberal Arts. In 1545 he left Cologne to teach in a superior school, probably at Düsseldorf, after which he was rector at Hamm (1545–50), and head of the Pauline Gymnasium at Münster, which had formerly held a high reputation. After twenty-five years of fruitful activity there, he was obliged to leave Münster, and he was placed in charge of the Schola Salentina in Düsseldorf, founded by the Electoral Prince Salentin of Cologne, where he remained, however, only three years. In 1578 he took charge of a superior school in Werl, which he soon gave up to return to Osnabrück, where he remained as rector of the cathedral school for the rest of his life.

It is reportedly chiefly owing to his farsightedness that the school system of Westphalia, which was on the decline, began in a short time to show signs of new life. His first care was to place on a better financial footing the poorly paid teachers of the time who were chiefly dependent on the contributions from the parents of their pupils. A still extant programme of studies of the Pauline Gymnasium for the year 1551, entitled Ratio studiorum scholae Monasteriensis, saeculi, XVI, shows that as teacher he laid greatest stress on a thorough grounding in Latin and Greek, advocating also the study of Hebrew, but utterly disregarding the exact and historical sciences (Realien). He required a high degree of skill in the preparation of written work, and careful and constant practice in oral recitation.

While in his capacity of teacher he was held in high repute, as historian he suffered much criticism. His first known work, written while he was in Cologne, was a poem in dactylic hexameters, Brevis descriptio belli Monasteriensis contra anabaptistica monstra gesti. His principal work deals with the same subject, Historia Anabaptistarum Monasteriensium (History of the Anabaptists of Munster). It was written on a broad scale, forming a history of the whole city from 1524 to 1554, including many eyewitness accounts. It is suggested by some that the work, written at the instance and with the assistance of the cathedral chapter, was biased against the municipal authorities and the patricians. They compelled him to retract several passages as being erroneous, to deliver over his manuscript, and to promise on oath to write no more books.

This work was published in 1730 in Leipzig by Meneke in Scriptores Rerum Germanicarum, vol. III, and in a German translation in Frankfurt in 1771 under title Geschichte der Wiedertäufer zu Münster nebst einer Beschreibung der Hauptstadt, Detmer brought out a revised edition: Hermanni a Kerssenbroch anabaptistici furoris Monasterium inclitam Westphaliae metropolim evertentis historica narratio (Münster, 1899). Kerssenbroch's position in Münster having become insupportable, he went to Paderborn, and while there, in spite of his oath, he published Catalogus episcoporum paderbonensium eorumque acta (Lemgo, 1578), availing himself of Person Gobelinus and others. The open violation of his oath lost him the respect of many friends, and forced him to leave Paderborn. At Werl he prepared a vindication, Causarum captivitatis M. Hermanni a Kerssenbrock succinta narratio cum earundem vera et solida confutatione, which, however, was never printed. To revenge himself upon his enemies, he resorted to a means which imperilled his life; he wrote a biting satire, "Noctua", in which he so exasperated his opponents that they sent a delegation to Werl to call him to account for perjury and breaking his oath, and his only safety lay in flight.
