= Giuseppe Jannacconi =

Italian composer

Giuseppe Jannacconi (Janacconi, Gianacconi; 1740 – 16 March 1816) was an Italian composer, one of the last in the style of Palestrina.

Jannaconi was born in Rome, and studied under Don Socorso Rinaldini and Giuseppe Carpani. He is known for scoring many of Palestrina's works, aided by his friend Pasquale Pisari, as well as composing many of pieces of church music himself. Among other positions, towards the end of his life in 1811 he succeeded Niccolò Antonio Zingarelli as maestro di cappella at St. Peter's Basilica.
