= List of Italian films of 1992 =

A list of films produced in Italy in 1992 (see 1992 in film):

Title	Director	Cast	Genre	Notes
1992
Acla's Descent into Floristella	Aurelio Grimaldi	Tony Sperandeo, Luigi Maria Burruano	Historical drama	
Acquitted for Having Committed the Deed	Alberto Sordi	Alberto Sordi, Angela Finocchiaro	Comedy	
Alibi perfetto	Aldo Lado	Michael Woods, Annie Girardot	Giallo	
All Ladies Do It	Tinto Brass	Claudia Koll	Erotic	
Un'altra vita	Carlo Mazzacurati	Silvio Orlando, Adrianna Biedrzyńska, Claudio Amendola	Comedy-Drama	1 David di Donatello
Al lupo al lupo	Carlo Verdone	Carlo Verdone, Francesca Neri, Sergio Rubini	Comedy-Drama	2 Nastro d'Argento
Ambrogio	Wilma Labate	Roberto Citran, Paolo Graziosi, Anita Ekberg	Comedy	
Anni 90	Enrico Oldoini	Christian De Sica, Massimo Boldi, Ezio Greggio	Comedy	
Atlantis	Luc Besson	-	Documentary	
Beyond Justice	Duccio Tessari	Rutger Hauer, Carol Alt, Omar Sharif, Elliott Gould	Action-drama	
La bionda	Sergio Rubini	Nastassja Kinski, Sergio Rubini, Ennio Fantastichini	Thriller	
Body Puzzle	Lamberto Bava	Joanna Pacula, Tomas Arana	Thriller-horror	
Brothers and Sisters	Pupi Avati	Stefano Accorsi, Anna Bonaiuto, Paola Quattrini, Franco Nero	Drama	1 Nastro d'Argento
Cattive ragazze	Marina Ripa Di Meana	Eva Grimaldi, Burt Young	Romantic drama	
Ciao, Professore!	Lina Wertmüller	Paolo Villaggio, Paolo Bonacelli	Comedy-Drama	
Close Friends	Michele Placido	Asia Argento, Claudia Pandolfi	Romance-Drama	
Death of a Neapolitan Mathematician	Mario Martone	Carlo Cecchi, Anna Bonaiuto, Renato Carpentieri, Toni Servillo	Drama	7 Awards
Fish Soup	Fiorella Infascelli	Chiara Caselli, Philippe Noiret	Comedy-Drama	
A Fine Romance	Gene Saks	Julie Andrews, Marcello Mastroianni	Romance	
Flight of the Innocent	Carlo Carlei	Francesca Neri, Jacques Perrin	Drama	nominated at 51st Golden Globe Awards for Best Foreign Language Film
Gangsters	Massimo Guglielmi	Ennio Fantastichini, Isabella Ferrari, Giulio Scarpati	Drama	Entered into the 18th Moscow International Film Festival
Infelici e contenti	Neri Parenti	Renato Pozzetto, Ezio Greggio, Marina Suma	comedy	
Jackpot	Mario Orfini	Adriano Celentano, Kate Vernon, Christopher Lee	sci-fi-adventure	Box office bomb
Maledetto il giorno che t'ho incontrato	Carlo Verdone	Carlo Verdone, Margherita Buy	romantic comedy	3 David di Donatello
Mean Tricks	Umberto Lenzi	Charles Napier	Crime	
Nero	Giancarlo Soldi	Sergio Castellitto, Chiara Caselli	Giallo-comedy	
Non chiamarmi Omar	Sergio Staino	Stefania Sandrelli, Ornella Muti, Gastone Moschin, Elena Sofia Ricci	Comedy	
Oro	Fabio Bonzi	Franco Nero, Vittoria Belvedere, Carlo Cecchi	Historical drama	
Un orso chiamato Arturo	Sergio Martino	George Segal, Carol Alt	Spy comedy	
Ostinato destino	Gianfranco Albano	Monica Bellucci, Alessandro Gassman	Drama	
Parenti serpenti	Mario Monicelli	Marina Confalone, Alessandro Haber, Paolo Panelli	Black comedy	1 Nastro d'Argento
Puerto Escondido	Gabriele Salvatores	Diego Abatantuono, Valeria Golino, Renato Carpentieri	Comedy	2 Nastro d'Argento
Ricky e Barabba	Christian De Sica	Renato Pozzetto, Christian De Sica	Comedy	
Sabato italiano	Luciano Manuzzi	Francesca Neri, Isabelle Pasco, Chiara Caselli	Drama	
Saint Tropez, Saint Tropez	Castellano & Pipolo	Jerry Calà, Debora Caprioglio, Serena Grandi	Comedy	
Il segreto di una donna	Joe D'Amato	Margaux Hemingway, Daniel McVicar, Apollonia Kotero	Erotic thriller	
The Smile of the Fox (Spiando Marina)	Sergio Martino	Debora Caprioglio, Sharon Twomey	Erotic thriller	
Sognando la California	Carlo Vanzina	Massimo Boldi, Nino Frassica, Bo Derek	Comedy	
Stolen Children (Il ladro di bambini)	Gianni Amelio	Enrico Lo Verso, Valentina Scalici, Giuseppe Ieracitano	Drama	6 David di Donatello. 2 Nastro d'Argento. Cannes Award. European Film Awards Best film
Tutti gli uomini di Sara	Gianpaolo Tescari	Nancy Brilli, Giulio Scarpati	Giallo	
The Valley of Stone	Maurizio Zaccaro	Charles Dance	Drama	
Verso Sud	Pasquale Pozzessere	Antonella Ponziani, Stefano Dionisi	drama	2 David di Donatello
Vietato ai minori	Maurizio Ponzi	Alessandro Haber, Mariella Valentini, Sabrina Ferilli	Comedy	
When We Were Repressed	Pino Quartullo	Pino Quartullo, Alessandro Gassman	Comedy	
