= 39th David di Donatello =

1995 Italian film awards

- Date: 18 June 1994
- Site: Campidoglio, Rome
- Hosted by: Rosanna Vaudetti

Highlights
- Best Picture: Caro diario
- Most awards: For Love, Only for Love (3)
- Most nominations: For Love, Only for Love (10)

Television coverage
- Network: Rai 1

The 39th David di Donatello ceremony, presented by the Accademia del Cinema Italiano, was held on 18 June 1994.

== Winners and nominees ==
| Best Film: Caro diario, directed by Nanni Moretti; For Love, Only for Love, directed by Giovanni Veronesi; Let's Not Keep in Touch, directed by Carlo Verdone | Best Producer: Aurelio De Laurentiis – For Love, Only for Love; Angelo Barbagallo, Nanni Moretti – Caro diario; Giovanni Di Clemente – Giovanni Falcone |
| Best Director: Carlo Verdone – Let's Not Keep in Touch; Nanni Moretti – Caro diario; Pasquale Pozzessere – Father and Son | Best New Director: Simona Izzo – Sentimental Maniacs (ex aequo); Francesco Ranieri Martinotti – Abissinia (ex aequo); Leone Pompucci – Mille bolle blu (ex aequo) |
| Best Actor: Giulio Scarpati – Law of Courage; Diego Abatantuono – For Love, Only for Love; Nanni Moretti – Caro diario; Silvio Orlando – Sud | Best Actress: Asia Argento – Let's Not Keep in Touch; Chiara Caselli – Where Are You? I'm Here; Barbara De Rossi – Sentimental Maniacs |
| Best Supporting Actor: Alessandro Haber – For Love, Only for Love; Giancarlo Giannini – Giovanni Falcone; Leopoldo Trieste – Law of Courage | Best Supporting Actress: Monica Scattini – Sentimental Maniacs; Regina Bianchi – Law of Courage; Stefania Sandrelli – For Love, Only for Love |
| David di Donatello for Best Screenplay: Ugo Chiti, Giovanni Veronesi – For Love, Only for Love; Francesca Marciano, Carlo Verdone – Let's Not Keep in Touch; Nanni Moretti – Caro diario | Best Cinematography: Bruno Cascio – Father and Son (ex aequo); Dante Spinotti – The Secret of the Old Woods (ex aequo); Luca Bigazzi – A Soul Split in Two; Giuseppe Lanci – Caro diario |
| Best Production Design: Antonello Geleng – Cemetery Man; Giantito Burchiellaro – Sparrow; Enrico Fiorentini – For Love, Only for Love | Best Score: Nicola Piovani – Caro diario; Federico De Robertis – Sud; Nicola Piovani – For Love, Only for Love |
| Best Editing: Carlo Valerio – Father and Son; Nino Baragli – For Love, Only for Love; Mirco Garrone – Caro diario | Best Sound: Tullio Morganti – Sud; Benito Alchimede – Let's Not Keep in Touch; Franco Borni – Caro diario |
| Best Costumes: Piero Tosi – Sparrow; Maurizio Millenotti – The Secret of the Old Woods; Gabriella Pescucci – For Love, Only for Love | Best Foreign Film: In the Name of the Father, directed by Jim Sheridan; The Remains of the Day, directed by James Ivory; Schindler's List, directed by Steven Spielberg |
| Best Foreign Actor: Anthony Hopkins – The Remains of the Day; Daniel Day-Lewis – In the Name of the Father; Al Pacino – Carlito's Way | Best Foreign Actress: Emma Thompson – The Remains of the Day; Holly Hunter – The Piano; Michelle Pfeiffer – The Age of Innocence |
| Special David: Alberto Sordi; Alberto Lattuada; Stefano Dionisi | Luchino Visconti Award: Manoel de Oliveira |
