= 38th David di Donatello =

1995 Italian film awards

- Date: 5 June 1993
- Site: Campidoglio, Rome
- Hosted by: Massimo Wertmüller; Elena Sofia Ricci

Highlights
- Best Picture: The Great Pumpkin
- Most awards: The Escort (5)
- Most nominations: The Escort (9)

The 38th David di Donatello ceremony, presented by the Accademia del Cinema Italiano, was held on 5 June 1993.

== Winners and nominees ==
Best Film: The Great Pumpkin, directed by Francesca Archibugi; The Escort, directed by Ricky Tognazzi; Jonah Who Lived in the Whale, directed by Roberto Faenza	Best Producer: Claudio Bonivento - The Escort; Guido De Laurentiis, Fulvio Lucisano, Leo Pescarolo - The Great Pumpkin; Elda Ferri - Jonah Who Lived in the Whale
Best Director: Roberto Faenza – Jonah Who Lived in the Whale (ex aequo); Ricky Tognazzi – The Escort (ex aequo); Francesca Archibugi – The Great Pumpkin	Best New Director: Mario Martone – Death of a Neapolitan Mathematician; Pasquale Pozzessere – Going South; Carlo Carlei – Flight of the Innocent
Best Actor: Sergio Castellitto – The Great Pumpkin; Carlo Cecchi – Death of a Neapolitan Mathematician; Silvio Orlando – Un'altra vita	Best Actress: Antonella Ponziani – Going South; Margherita Buy – Cominciò tutto per caso; Carla Gravina – The Long Silence
Best Supporting Actor: Claudio Amendola – Un'altra vita; Renato Carpentieri – Fiorile; Leo Gullotta – The Escort	Best Supporting Actress: Marina Confalone – The Storm Is Coming; Alessia Fugardi – The Great Pumpkin; Monica Scattini – Un'altra vita
David di Donatello for Best Screenplay: Francesca Archibugi – The Great Pumpkin; Graziano Diana, Simona Izzo – The Escort; Roberto Faenza, Filippo Ottoni – Jonah Who Lived in the Whale	Best Cinematography: Alessio Gelsini Torresi – The Escort; Luca Bigazzi – Death of a Neapolitan Mathematician; Giuseppe Lanci – Fiorile
Best Production Design: Gianna Sbarra – Fiorile; Giancarlo Muselli – Death of a Neapolitan Mathematician; Carlo Simi – Stone Valley	Best Score: Ennio Morricone – Jonah Who Lived in the Whale; Ennio Morricone – The Escort; Riz Ortolani – Magnificat
Best Editing: Carla Simoncelli – The Escort; Nino Baragli – Jonah Who Lived in the Whale; Jacopo Quadri – Death of a Neapolitan Mathematician	Best Sound: Remo Ugolinelli – The Escort; Bruno Pupparo – Fiorile; Alessandro Zanon – The Great Pumpkin
Best Costumes: Elisabetta Beraldo – Jonah Who Lived in the Whale; Lina Nerli Taviani – Fiorile; Sissi Parravicini – Magnificat	Best Foreign Film: A Heart in Winter, directed by Claude Sautet; Howards End, directed by James Ivory; The Crying Game, directed by Neil Jordan
Best Foreign Actor: Daniel Auteuil – A Heart in Winter; Anthony Hopkins – Howards End; Stephen Rea – The Crying Game	Best Foreign Actress: Emmanuelle Béart – A Heart in Winter (ex aequo); Tilda Swinton – Orlando (ex aequo); Emma Thompson – Howards End (ex aequo)
Special David: Carlo Cecchi	Luchino Visconti Award: Edgar Reitz; Franco Cristaldi Award: Carlo Ludovico Bragaglia
