= Roberto Tiraboschi =

Italian writer, playwright and screenwriter

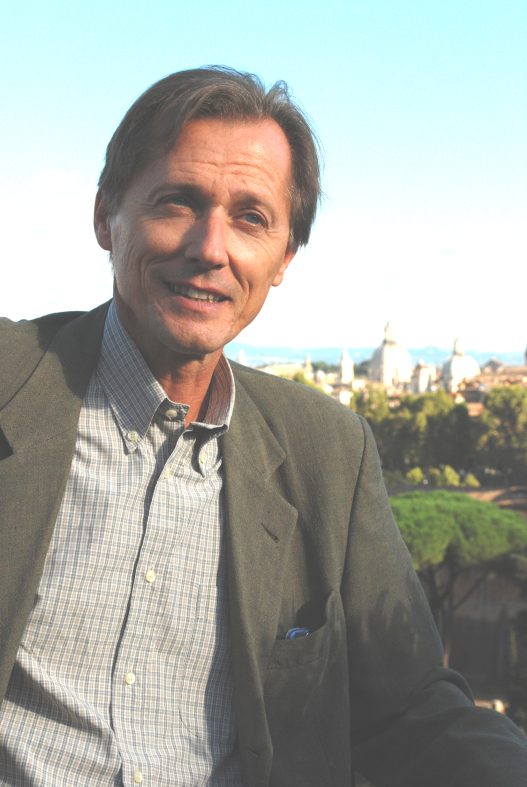
Roberto Tiraboschi

Roberto Tiraboschi is an Italian writer, playwright and screenwriter. He was born in Bergamo, Lombardy, in 1958.

Currently he splits his time between Rome and Venice.

== Life ==
In 1976 Tiraboschi graduated in Letters at the University of Milan and as actor and assistant director at the academy of “Piccolo Teatro” in Milan.

Afterwards, he started to work as a playwright and in 1982 he won his first award (Premio Riccione), with the drama “La madre rovesciata”.

His work as screenwriter began in 1989 with “The Peaceful Air of the West" (L'aria serena dell'Ovest)”, a feature film written together with Silvio Soldini. From there on, he started working with many Italian film directors, as Pasquale Pozzessere, Liliana Cavani, Marco Pontecorvo.

Tiraboschi debuted as a novelist with “La levatrice di Thanatos” in 1995.

Since 2016, he teaches “Screenplay” at Experimental Cinematography Centre and at the Ca’ Foscari University of Venice.

== Awards ==
In 1982 he won the Premio Riccione for the drama “La madre rovesciata”.

With his book “Sonno” he won the Premio Narrativa di Bergamo (in 2007) and the Premio Stresa (in 2009).

== Bibliography ==
=== Novels ===
La levatrice di Thanatos, Dino Audino editore, 1995

Sguardo 11, edizioni e/o, 2002

Sonno, edizioni e/o, 2007

La pietra per gli occhi. Venetia 1106, edizioni e/o, 2015

The eye stone. The first Medieval noir about the birth of Venice, Europa Editions, 2015

La bottega dello speziale. Venetia 1118, edizioni e/o, 2016

The Apothecary's Shop: Venice 1118 A.D., Europa Editions, 2017

=== Theater ===
La madre rovesciata (1982)

Le lacrime del riso (1983)

On-Play-Off (1986)

Domeniche (1991)

=== Cinema ===
The Peaceful Air of the West (L'aria serena dell'Ovest) directed by Silvio Soldini (1989)

A Soul Split in Two (Un'anima divisa in due), directed by Silvio Soldini (1991)

Father and Son (Padre e figlio), directed by Pasquale Pozzessere (1994)

L'anniversario, directed by Mario Orfini (1998)

Pa-ra-da, directed by Marco Pontecorvo (2008)

Troppo amore, directed by di Liliana Cavani, episode of “Mai per amore” TV series (2012)

Partly Cloudy with Sunny Spells Tempo instabile con probabili schiarite, directed by Marco Pontecorvo (2015)
