= Grand Prix (Annecy Film Festival) =

The Grand Prix is an award, born in 1985, of the Annecy Italian Film Festival bestowed by the jury of the festival on one of the competing feature films.

== Grand Prix ==
Year	Film	Director
1985	Così parlo Bellavista	Luciano de Crescenzo
1986	GiovanniSenzaPensieri	Marco Colli
1987	Notte Italiana	Carlo Mazzacurati
1988	Zoo	Cristina Comencini
1989	Il prete bello	Carlo Mazzacurati
1990	L'aria serena dell'ovest	Silvio Soldini
1991	Condominio	Felice Farina
1992	Verso sud	Pasquale Pozzessere
1993	Donne in un giorno di festa	Salvatore Maira
1994	Portami via	Gianluca Maria Tavarelli
1995	Empoli 1921: film in rosso e in nero	Ennio Marzocchini
1996	I magi randagi	Sergio Citti
1997	Il carniere	Maurizio Zaccaro
1998	La stanza dello scirocco	Maurizio Sciarra
1999	Fuori dal mondo	Giuseppe Piccioni
2000	I cento passi	Marco Tullio Giordana
2001	Domani	Francesca Archibugi
2002	Velocità Massima	Daniele Vicari
2003	Il dono	Michelangelo Frammartino
2004	Fame chimica	Paolo Vari and Antonio Bocola
2005	Saimir	Francesco Munzi
2006	Il vento fa il suo giro	Giorgio Diritti
2007	Riparo	Marco Simon Puccioni
2008	Se chiudi gli occhi	Lisa Romano
2009	La Bella Gente	Ivano de Matteo
2010	Le quattro volte	Michelangelo Frammartino
