= Roberto Zibetti =

Italian actor (born 1971)

- Zibetti in 2017
- Born: 11 March 1971 (age 55); Summit, New Jersey, U.S.
- Occupations: Actor; theatre director
- Years active: 1990–present

Roberto Zibetti (born 11 March 1971) is an Italian actor and theatre director.

== Life and career ==
Born in Summit, New Jersey, to Italian parents, Zibetti grew up in Turin, Italy.

He made his stage debut in 1990 in The Last Days of Mankind, directed by Luca Ronconi. He also worked with theatre director Giorgio Strehler. He made his film debut in Nessuno (1992), directed by Francesco Calogero, while his first leading role came in Giacomo Battiato's controversial Diary of a Rapist (1995), in which he portrayed Luca Mariotti, a young man who rapes and manipulates women. In a later interview, Zibetti described the role as a psychologically demanding experience.

His subsequent notable film appearances included Bernardo Bertolucci's Stealing Beauty (1996), Luciano Ligabue's Radiofreccia (1998), Marco Tullio Giordana's One Hundred Steps (2000) and Dario Argento's Sleepless (2001).

Zibetti appeared in the Jackal's science-fiction comedy Addio fottuti musi verdi (2017), in which he played the villain Brandon. In Marco Tullio Giordana's crime drama Yara (2021), he portrayed Massimo Bossetti. In 2025, he appeared in Paolo Sorrentino's La grazia.

From 2024 to 2026, Zibetti portrayed record producer Claudio Cecchetto in the Sky television series Accidentally Famous.

== Filmography (selection) ==
Film
| Year | Title | Role |
|---|---|---|
| 1992 | Nessuno | Alessio |
| 1995 | Diary of a Rapist | Luca Mariotti |
| 1996 | Stealing Beauty | Niccolò Donati |
| 1997 | The Game Bag | Roberto |
| 1998 | Radiofreccia | Boris |
| 1999 | A casa di Irma | Marco |
| 2000 | One Hundred Steps | Carlo |
| 2000 | L'educazione di Giulio | Mario Sturani |
| 2001 | Sleepless | Lorenzo Betti |
| 2001 | Nella terra di nessuno | Talieri |
| 2008 | Anotherworld | Norman |
| 2009 | Vivaldi, the Red Priest | |
| 2023 | Maria Montessori | Journalist |
| 2014 | Pasolini | Carlo |
| 2015 | Shades of Truth | Pope Pius XII |
| 2015 | I Killed Napoléon | Riccardo |
| 2017 | Addio fottuti musi verdi | Brandon |
| 2020 | Romantic Guide to Lost Places | Galberti |
| 2021 | Yara | Massimo Bossetti |
| 2025 | La grazia | Domenico Samaritano |
| 2025 | The Kidnapping of Arabella | Police officer |
| 2025 | My Tennis Maestro | Camillo Cecchetti |
| 2026 | Un weekend artificiale | |

Television
| Year | Title | Role | Notes |
|---|---|---|---|
| 2001 | Distretto di Polizia | Luigi | 3 episodes |
| 2003 | Incantesimo | Dr. Helmut Rudolph | 23 episodes |
| 2006 | Attacco allo Stato | Andrea | Miniseries |
| 2007 | La squadra | Officer Simone Ferro | 26 episodes |
| 2009 | Don Matteo | Amedeo | Episode "Perfetta" |
| 2023 | The Red Door | Ludovico Muric | 8 episodes |
| 2024–2026 | Accidentally Famous | Claudio Cecchetto | Main role; 11 episodes |
