= Ivano De Matteo =

Italian director, screenwriter, and actor

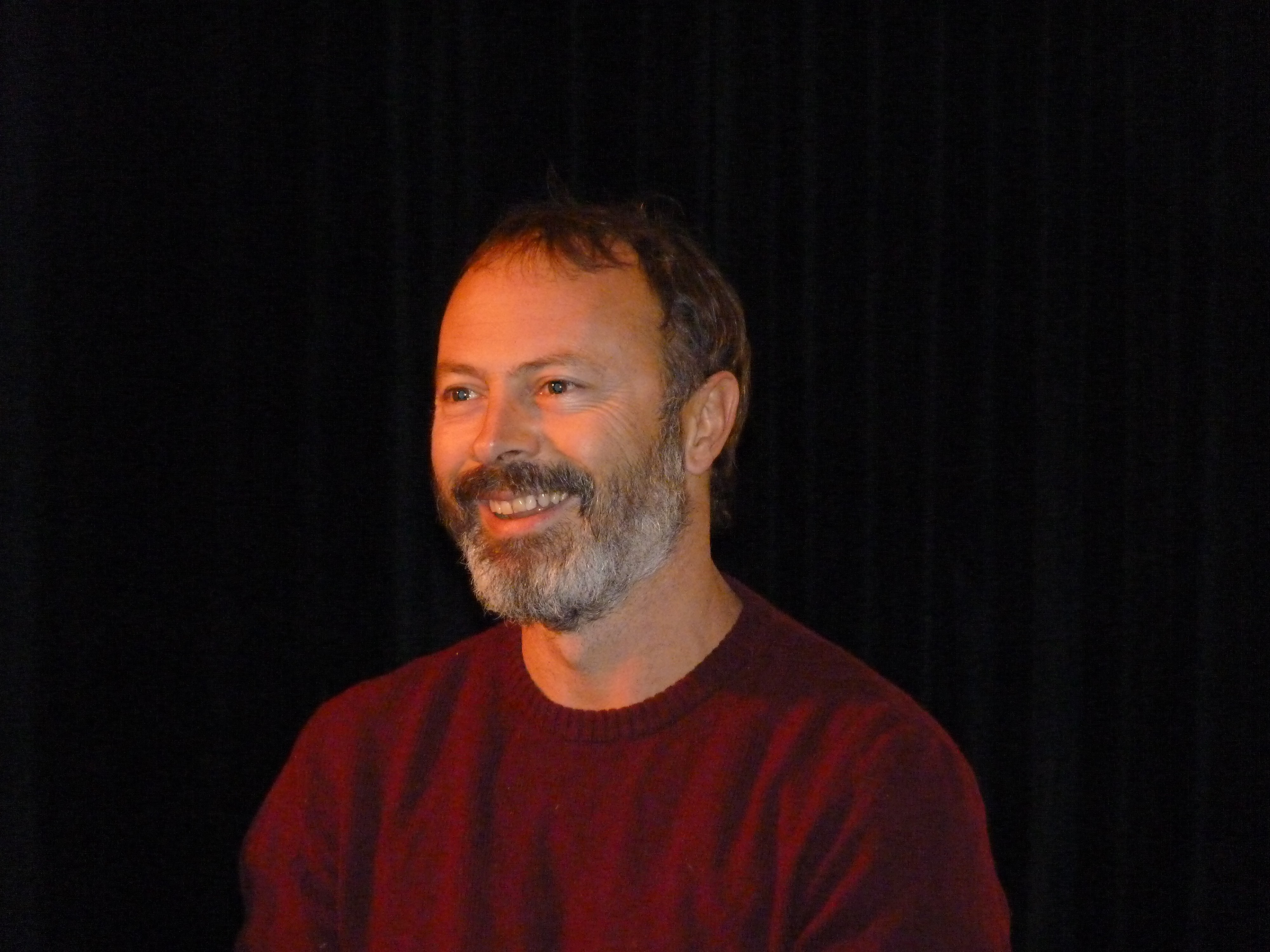
- Ivano De Matteo in 2012
- Born: 22 January 1966 (age 60); Rome, Italy
- Occupations: Director; Screenwriter; Actor

Ivano De Matteo (born 22 January 1966) is an Italian director, screenwriter, and actor.

== Life and career ==
Born in Rome, De Matteo formed as an actor in the drama laboratory "Il Mulino di Fiora", and later formed a stage company together with his romantic partner and longtime collaborator Valentina Ferlan. He made his film debut in Pasquale Pozzessere's Verso Sud. As an actor, he had his breakout in 2008, with the role of Er Puma in the TV-series Romanzo criminale – La serie. The same year, he won the Nastro d'Argento for best actor in a short film for his performance in Giorgio Caputo's Action.

After directing a documentary film, Prigioniero di una fede, which received a special mention at the Turin Film Festival, De Matteo made his feature film directorial debut in 2002 with the comedy-drama Final Stage.

== Selected filmography ==
As director

- Final Stage (2002)
- La bella gente (2009)
- Balancing Act (2012)
- The Dinner (2014)
- La vita possibile (2016)
- Mia (2023)

As actor

- Verso Sud (1992)
- Close Friends (1992)
- Maximum Velocity (V-Max) (2002)
- Gente di Roma (2003)
- Romanzo criminale – La serie (TV, 2008–2010)
- Moana (TV, 2009)
