= Pozzessere =

Pozzessere is a surname. Notable people with the surname include:

- Heather Graham Pozzessere (born 1953), American writer
- Pasquale Pozzessere (born 1957), Italian film director and screenwriter
