= Gambirasio =

Gambirasio is an Italian surname. Notable people with the surname include:

- Patrizio Gambirasio (born 1961), Italian cyclist
- Yara Gambirasio (1997–2010), Italian murder victim
