= Andrea Arcangeli =

Italian actor (born 1993)

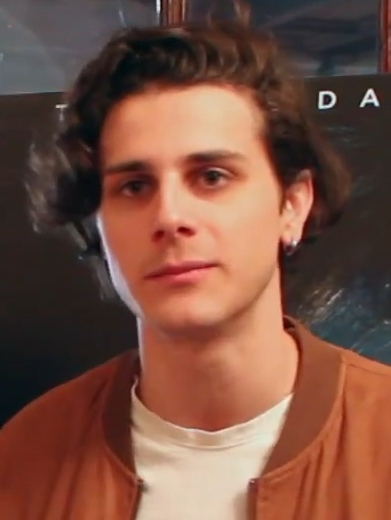
- Arcangeli in 2017
- Born: 3 August 1993 (age 32); Pescara, Italy
- Occupation: Actor

Andrea Arcangeli (born 3 August 1993) is an Italian film, television, and stage actor.

== Life and career ==
Born in Pescara, Arcangeli studied at the S.M.O. drama school, and made his professional debut on stage in 2009. In 2012, he moved to Rome to study performing arts at Sapienza University, and the same year he played a minor role in the Canale 5 TV-series Benvenuti a tavola - Nord vs Sud. After a few television roles, he made his film debut in Marco Pontecorvo's Partly Cloudy with Sunny Spells.

Arcangeli played his first film leading role in 2017, in Alessandro D'Alatri's The Startup. He had his breakout in 2020, playing Yemos in the series Romulus. In 2021, he played footballer Roberto Baggio in the Netflix film Baggio: The Divine Ponytail.

=== Personal life ===
Arcangeli plays drums and occasionally performs as a DJ.

== Filmography ==
=== Film ===
Year	Title	Role	Notes
2015	Partly Cloudy with Sunny Spells	Tito	
2017	The Startup	Matteo Achilli	
2017	Loris sta bene	Loris	Short film
2018	Dei	Ettore	
2019	Domani è un altro giorno	Leo	
2021	Baggio: The Divine Ponytail	Roberto Baggio	
2021	Il muto di Gallura	Bastiano Tansu	
2022	La donna per me	Andrea	
2023	Like Sheep Among Wolves	Bruno	
2024	The First Omen	Paolo	
2024	Casi el paraíso	Ugo Conti / Amedeo Pádula	
2024	La confessione	Giacomo	Short film
2025	I Am Rosa Ricci	Victor	
2025	The Big Fake	Don Vittorio	

=== Television ===
Year	Title	Role	Notes
2014	Romeo e Giulietta	Anthony	Two-parts television film
2014–2015	Fuoriclasse	Michele Tramola	Main role (season 2-3)
2015	FuoriclasseOFF	Michele Tramola	Web episodes of Fuoriclasse
2015–2016	The Ladies' Paradise	Mario Iorio	Recurring role (season 1)
2018	Trust	Angelo	4 episodes
2018	Aldo Moro: Il professore	Emilio	Television film
2020–2022	Romulus	Yemos	Lead role
2025	Martin Scorsese Presents: The Saints	Francis of Assisi	Episode: "Francis of Assisi"
2026	Prima di noi	Lorenzo Sartori	Main role
