= Boom! (1968 film) =

1968 film by Josph Losey

- Theatrical release poster
- Directed by: Joseph Losey
- Screenplay by: Tennessee Williams
- Based on: The Milk Train Doesn't Stop Here Anymore (1963 play) by Tennessee Williams
- Produced by: John Heyman; Norman Priggen
- Starring: Elizabeth Taylor; Richard Burton; Noël Coward
- Cinematography: Douglas Slocombe
- Edited by: Reginald Beck
- Music by: John Barry
- Production company: Universal Pictures; World Film Services; Moonlake Productions
- Distributed by: Universal Pictures
- Release dates: 26 May 1968 (US); October 1968 (UK)
- Running time: 113 minutes
- Country: United Kingdom; United States
- Languages: English; Italian
- Budget: $4,592,762
- Box office: $2,898,079

Boom! is a 1968 drama film directed by Joseph Losey, adapted by Tennessee Williams from his 1963 stage play The Milk Train Doesn't Stop Here Anymore. It stars Elizabeth Taylor, Richard Burton and Noël Coward. The film centers on a wealthy, terminally-ill woman living in seclusion on a Mediterranean island (Taylor), whose existence is disrupted by the arrival of a mysterious, possibly-mystical man (Burton).

The film premiered on May 26, 1968. Though Boom! was a critical and commercial disappointment on initial release, Tennessee Williams considered it the best film adaptation of one of his plays.

== Plot ==
Flora 'Sissy' Goforth is a terminally-ill woman living with a coterie of servants, whom she verbally abuses, in a large mansion on a secluded Italian island. Into her life comes a mysterious man, Christopher Flanders, nicknamed "L'Angelo della morte" ("The Angel of Death"). Christopher claims to have met her previously, while Flora, for her part, affects not to remember having met him before. Flora is said to suffer from neuritis and several other kinds of "-itis."

In her complex of villas wired for sound, so she can at any moment resume her dictation, Flora is dictating her memoirs detailing her multiple marriages, and her affair with her only love - a now-deceased poet. She is interrupted when her guard dogs attack Christopher as he climbs the cliff side to her estate. She has her secretary Miss Black (whom she calls 'Blackie' throughout the film), set him up in a villa for him to recuperate. She also provides him with a samurai warrior's robe, with accompanying sword, to wear in lieu of his clothes that had been shredded from the dog attack.

She invites The Witch of Capri to dinner on her terrace. The 'Witch' informs her of Christopher's nickname and his history of visiting the dying shortly before their demise. Flora becomes convinced that he indeed may be an omen of her own impending doom, though she is in denial of it. Christopher meanwhile flagrantly seduces Miss Black, whose husband had died the year previously.

Flora begins to become enamoured by Christopher, as well as terrified of him. She fluctuates between emotional vulnerability and being bombastic and heated. She drives Miss Black to quit her secretarial job and grows weaker as the day turns into night.

As she lies in bed dying, Christopher tells her a story of how he helped an old man with low quality of life drown and end his suffering. As he speaks, he takes her huge diamond ring—a symbol of taking away his "victim’s" life, but also of relieving her of earthly concerns. Flora dies following the speech and Christopher throws her ring off the cliff. The film ends with the sight of waves crashing and Christopher murmuring, "Boom!"

== Cast ==
- Elizabeth Taylor as Flora 'Sissy' Goforth
- Richard Burton as Christopher Flanders
- Noël Coward as The Witch of Capri
- Joanna Shimkus as Miss Black
- Michael Dunn as Rudi
- Romolo Valli as Dr Luilo
- Fernando Piazza as Etti
- Veronica Wells as Simonetta
- Howard Taylor as Journalist

== Production ==
Elizabeth Taylor's career was in decline by 1968, due to her age and recent box-office failures. She sought to use another adaptation of Tennessee Williams' work to revitalize her career. The Milk Train Doesn't Stop Here Anymore was unsuccessful during its run, but Universal Pictures had already acquired the film rights for the play. These two facts compelled Losey's interest in the project.

The film was retitled multiple times to Boom, Sunburst, and Goforth before Boom! was selected. The film was shot on Sardinia and a mansion set was constructed for $500,000. Production was delayed after Taylor contracted bronchitis the day that filming was meant to start. During filming Taylor's pet monkey stole a $1,600 jewel case and was missing for a year. Taylor received a $60,000 brooch from producer John Heyman and Bulgari loaned $2 million of jewels for the film. The film cost £1,913,650 ($4,592,762) to make.

Donald Sutherland was considered for the role of Rudi, before Michael Dunn was cast.

A trailer that served as her dressing room came loose from its moorings only a few seconds after Taylor stepped out of it, and "plunged over a 150-foot embankment into the sea". Built especially for the film, the mansion of Mrs Flora Goforth is situated high atop the limestone cliffs of Isola de Presa, a small island in the Mediterranean off the coast of Sardinia. Along the bluffs are replicas of the Easter Island moai heads, six of them, representing perhaps the spirits of the six husbands she outlived. Some interiors of the mansion were sets in Rome.

== Release ==
The film grossed $514,725 in the United States, $20,719 in the United Kingdom, and $2,898,079 worldwide during its theatrical run. It was a financial failure and lost $3,795,452. $1,207,681 was earned from television showings in the United States.

== Reception ==
On Rotten Tomatoes it has an approval rating of 20% based on reviews from 15 critics. Variety stated that the film was "one of the biggest box-office losers of the year".

Writing in the Village Voice, critic Andrew Sarris’s assessment is an exception to the generally unflattering contemporary reviews: “Boom! is a prime example of the power of mise-en-scene to translate a relatively trivial enterprise into a beautiful entertainment.”

Time wrote "They display the self-indulgent fecklessness of a couple of rich amateurs hamming it up at the country-club." The film was referred to as a "a pointless, pompous nightmare" by Newsweek, an "ordeal in tedium" by The Hollywood Reporter, "outright junk" by Saturday Review, and the Los Angeles Herald Examiner asked "Why was Boom! ever filmed in the first place?".

Richard Schickel, writing in Life, stated that the "title could not be more apt; it is precisely the sound of a bomb exploding."

Filmink called it "spectacularly miscast" and argued the film help bring an end to Tennessee Williams' popularity with Hollywood studios.

Film critic Dan Callahan at Senses of Cinema writes: “For all its unintentional humor, and far-out miscasting, Boom! is actually a fairly good adaptation of a beautiful late Williams play.”

Contemporary critics were especially disparaging that the Burtons were cast as the protagonists for William's play. Losey biographer Foster Hirsch agrees that Richard Burton was too old to represent the strapping young poet and angel of death Chris Flanders; nor is the physically attractive Elizabeth Taylor convincing as the "dying, withering cortesian" Flora Goforth: "Neither is correct for the parts as Williams originally conceived them." Physical attributes aside, Hirsch argues that Burton and Taylor endow a "belabored" play with a "lively and poignant humanity…anchoring Williams’s and Losey’s abstract allegorizing in an earthy realism."

Stylistically, Hirsch calls Boom! “a work of visual virtuosity, a rapturous employment of color, wide screen, music, and decor, resulting in the most richly textured film in a canon remarkable for its textural qualities.”

Though unsuccessful both critically and financially, Boom! has acquired a camp reputation and a cult following. Filmmaker John Waters admires the film, and chose it as a favorite to present in the first Maryland Film Festival in 1999. The film's poster is visible in Waters' 1972 film Pink Flamingos. In an interview with Robert K. Elder for his book The Best Film You've Never Seen, Waters describes the film as "beyond bad. It's the other side of camp. It's beautiful, atrocious, and it's perfect. It's a perfect movie, really, and I never tire of it."

In retrospect, the filmmakers felt no regret. Joseph Losey acknowledged his affection for the work, "sometimes citing it as his personal favorite." Tennessee Willams considered it the best movie adaptation of one of his plays.

== Documentary ==
In October 2022, the 17th Rome Film Festival saw the premiere of the "making-of" documentary L’estate di Joe, Liz e Richard (A Summer with Joe, Liz & Richard), written and directed by Sergio Naitza, and featuring appearances by John Waters, Joanna Shimkus, Patricia Losey, Michel Ciment, Gianni Bozzacchi, Valerio de Paolis, Gianni Bulgari, and Viram Jasani, with Giulia Naitza acting as tour guide on the film's locations.

== Sources ==
- Callahan, Dan. 2003. Losey, Joseph. Senses of Cinema, March 2003. Great Directors Issue 25.https://www.sensesofcinema.com/2003/great-directors/losey/#:~:text=The%20dominant%20themes%20of%20Losey's,love%20story%20in%20his%20films. Accessed 12 October 2024.
- Caute, David (1994). Joseph Losey: A Revenge on Life. Oxford University Press. ISBN 0-19-506410-0.
- Hirsch, Foster. 1980. Joseph Losey. Twayne Publishers, Boston, Massachusetts. ISBN 0-8057-9257-0
- Medved, Harry; Medved, Michael (1984). The Hollywood Hall of Shame: The Most Expensive Flops in Movie History. Angus & Robertson. ISBN 0207149291.
- Palmer, James and Riley, Michael. 1993. The Films of Joseph Losey. Cambridge University Press, Cambridge, England. ISBN 0-521-38386-2
