= Baggio: The Divine Ponytail =

2021 Italian film

- Italian: Il Divin Codino
- Directed by: Letizia Lamartire
- Written by: Ludovica Rampoldi; Stefano Sardo
- Starring: Andrea Arcangeli; Valentina Bellè; Thomas Trabacchi
- Cinematography: Benjamin Maier
- Music by: Matteo Buzzanca
- Production company: Fabula Pictures
- Distributed by: Netflix
- Release date: 26 May 2021
- Running time: 92 minutes
- Country: Italy
- Language: Italian

Baggio: The Divine Ponytail (Italian: Il Divin Codino) is a 2021 biographical sports film directed by Letizia Lamartire, written by Ludovica Rampoldi and Stefano Sardo and starring Andrea Arcangeli, Valentina Bellè and Thomas Trabacchi. It is based on real life events of Italian footballer Roberto Baggio. Netflix released the film for streaming on 26 May 2021.

== Synopsis ==
A chronicle of the 22-year career of football star Roberto Baggio (Andrea Arcangeli), that includes his relationship with family members, his turbulent debut as a player and differences with some of his coaches, between successes, injuries, and his discovery of Buddhism. The film begins with a young Baggio dreaming to win the FIFA World Cup with Italy against Brazil, to revenge the 1970 final. The most significant moment of Baggio's career is the 1994 FIFA World Cup, where he almost single-handedly carries his team to the final, against Brazil. Baggio has the occasion to lift the World Cup trophy also taking the long dreamed revenge. Unfortunately, the match is decided on a Penalty shoot-out, and Baggio himself fails the last penalty, handing the trophy to Brazil. In 2002, he hopes to participate to the World Cup, but a serious injury towards the end of the Serie A season seems to nullify his hopes. Instead, he returns to football only 77 days from the injury. However, the head coach of the national team, Giovanni Trapattoni, controversially decides not to call him up. The film ends with Baggio supported of his family and friends, as well as in the love of the fans who have accompanied him throughout his career.

== Cast ==
- Andrea Arcangeli as Roberto Baggio
- Valentina Bellè as Andreina
- Thomas Trabacchi as Vittorio Petrone
- Andrea Pennacchi as Florindo
- Anna Ferruzzo as Matilde Baggio
- Simone Colombari as Fiorentina manager
- Antonio Zavatteri as Arrigo Sacchi
- Martufello as Carlo Mazzone
- Beppe Rosso as Giovanni Trapattoni
- Marc Clotet as Josep "Pep" Guardiola
- Roberto Baggio (archival)
- Paolo Maldini (archival)

== Release ==
Netflix released the film for streaming on 26 May 2021.

== Reception ==
On review aggregator website Rotten Tomatoes, the film holds an approval rating of 75% based on 4 reviews. Ben Kenigsberg of The New York Times wrote, "In real-life clips during the credits, an announcer calls him 'probably the most beloved player in Italian football.' It's a measure of how muddled the movie is that it never conveys how or why he became beloved. Even the soccer is perfunctory. Instead of lingering on the pitch, the director, Letizia Lamartire, cuts to Baggio’s friends and family watching on TV. Chronologically malapportioned, the film races through key developments, such as Baggio’s recovery from an injury or commitment to Buddhist meditation, and more than once abruptly flashes forward several years."
