= The Mysterious Enchanter =

- Directed by: Pupi Avati
- Written by: Pupi Avati
- Produced by: Aurelio De Laurentiis; Antonio Avati
- Starring: Stefano Dionisi; Carlo Cecchi
- Cinematography: Cesare Bastelli
- Edited by: Amedeo Salfa
- Music by: Pino Donaggio
- Release date: 1996
- Language: Italian

L'arcano incantatore, internationally released as The Mysterious Enchanter and Arcane Sorcerer, is a 1996 Italian horror film directed by Pupi Avati and set in the 18th century.

== Plot ==
In 1750, the seminarian Giacomo Vigetti is forced to leave Bologna to avoid conviction, after having impregnated a girl and inducing her to have an abortion. The young man, looking for a place to take refuge, is directed to a villa, where he meets an old lady who, hidden behind a fresco, takes an oath of blood with him. She has the sackcloth of Giacomo's mother delivered as a pledge, with the promise that it will be returned to him once the task entrusted to him has been completed.

On the indication of the mysterious lady, the boy takes refuge in Medelana, in the Bolognese Apennines, to perform the function of secretary in the service of an enigmatic character, a monsignor removed from the Church for his studies on the occult that earned him the title of "arcane spellcaster" ("mysterious enchanter" in some translations). The latter lives alone in an isolated house, surrounded by the volumes of a gigantic library, and Giacomo must replace Nerio, his previous assistant, who died in unclear circumstances and about whom ambiguous rumors circulated. The monsignor makes the young man participate in esoteric experiments, and from time to time instructs him to transcribe the encrypted codes dictated by him, which must then be sent to an unknown recipient. The two make a kind of friendship, and the boy quickly convinces himself that in the telepathic and magical searches of his master there is nothing sinister.

Some time later, there is a rumor in the town that Nerio is returning to life. Giacomo learns about it and communicates it to the elderly, who does not give it weight, and also urges him not to believe the malicious rumors about his old helper. One night Giacomo exhumed Nerio's body and brought it to the parish priest of the town; here he discovers with amazement that the corpse is that of the monsignor.

Giacomo thus realizes that the arcane enchanter is actually Nerio and has a scuffle with him, after which he runs away. But, finally going to recover the pledge made for the oath, he will make a bitter discovery.

== Recognition ==
Pupi Avati was awarded a Silver Crow in the Brussels International Fantastic Film Festival of 1998 for the film.

== Cast ==
- Stefano Dionisi as Giacomo Vigetti
- Carlo Cecchi as Nerio
- Arnaldo Ninchi as Aoledo
- Andrea Scorzoni as Don Zanini
- Mario Erpichini as Father Tommaso
- Vittorio Duse as Medelana's parson
- Patrizia Sacchi as Vielma
- Eliana Miglio as prostitute

== See also ==
- The Best Film You've Never Seen
