= Dekalog: Four =

1989 film from cycle directed by Krzysztof Kieślowski

- Directed by: Krzysztof Kieślowski
- Written by: Krzysztof Kieślowski; Krzysztof Piesiewicz
- Produced by: Ryszard Chutkovski
- Starring: Adrianna Biedrzyńska; Janusz Gajos; Adam Hanuszkiewicz
- Cinematography: Krzysztof Pakulski
- Edited by: Ewa Smal
- Music by: Zbigniew Preisner
- Distributed by: Polish Television
- Release date: September 1989 (Venice)
- Running time: 56 minutes
- Country: Poland
- Language: Polish
- Budget: $10,000

Dekalog: Four (Polish: Dekalog, cztery) is the fourth part of Dekalog, the drama series of films directed by Polish director Krzysztof Kieślowski for television, possibly connected to the fifth imperative of the Ten Commandments, "Honour thy father and thy mother".

The ten-part Dekalog series was exhibited in its entirety at the 46th Venice International Film Festival in September 1989, in the Special Events section. Dekalog: Seven premiered on Polish Television on 25 May 1990.

== Plot ==
Anka (Adrianna Biedrzyńska), a drama student, lives with her father, Michał (Janusz Gajos). Her mother has been dead since Anka was born. They get on well together and their relations are more like those between two friends rather than a father-daughter relationship. Michał often travels abroad on business trips and Anka does not feel very happy at home without him.

One Easter Monday, after playing their traditional water tricks on each other, Anka drives Michał to the airport, as he's off on another trip. Earlier that day she had discovered an envelope in her father's handwriting reading "Open after my death." It is later revealed that Anka had known about the envelope for years, but this was the first time that Michał had left it behind while he was on one of his trips. After a couple of days, she finally opens it. Inside, there is another envelope, on which she can read a short message from her mother "To my daughter, Anka." Anka wonders whether to open this envelope.

One week later, Michał is back from his trip and Anka waits for him at the airport. She is sullen and starts immediately quoting her mother's letter, explaining that Michał is not her real father. He slaps her, then explains that, while he is not surprised, he did not know about the content of the letter either. He had meant to give it to her several times but always felt that she was either too young or too old, and finally decided to leave the letter for Anka to find, in order for the inevitable to happen. Anka wonders if her feelings towards Michał have been only as daughter to father, or also as woman to man, since she somehow always felt that she was being unfaithful when sleeping with other men. She subtly tries to seduce Michał, who admits to also having felt jealousy, rather than just parental protectiveness, against Anka's boyfriends.

Finally, Anka surprisingly reveals the truth. She did not open the letter but wrote a new one instead, imitating her mother's handwriting after finding a similar envelope amongst her possessions from the hospital. The original envelope remained closed. After a long discussion they decide to burn the letter. However, the paper doesn't burn completely, Anka and Michał can read part of it, and the words are very similar to the beginning of Anka's fake letter. The film ends with them trying to read the fragments of the partly burnt letter: "My dearest daughter, I have something important to tell you. Michał is not... "

== Cast ==
- Adrianna Biedrzyńska - Anka
- Janusz Gajos - Michał
- Artur Barciś - young man
- Adam Hanuszkiewicz - professor
- Jan Tesarz - taxi driver
- Andrzej Blumenfeld - Michał's friend
- Tomasz Kozłowicz - Jarek
- Elżbieta Kilarska - Jarek's mother
- Helena Norowicz - doctor

=== Cast notes ===
- As in most of the episodes (except 7 and 10), Artur Barciś plays a cameo-observer role, this time as a young man rowing across the river and then carrying his boat away after exchanging glances with Anka. Later, in the scene in which Anka admits having written a fake letter, he walks past again with his boat.
- Of the actors appearing in other episodes, we can see briefly Jan Tesarz, who plays a main role in episode 5, as a taxi driver, as well as the elderly doctor (Aleksander Bardini) from Dekalog: Two.
