= Sleepless (2001 film) =

2001 Italian giallo film by Dario Argento

- Italian theatrical poster
- Italian: Non ho sonno
- Directed by: Dario Argento
- Written by: Dario Argento; Franco Ferrini; Carlo Lucarelli; Asia Argento
- Produced by: Dario Argento; Claudio Argento
- Starring: Max von Sydow; Stefano Dionisi; Chiara Caselli; Roberto Zibetti; Gabriele Lavia
- Cinematography: Ronnie Taylor
- Edited by: Anna Napoli
- Music by: Goblin
- Production companies: Cecchi Gori Group Tiger Cinematografica; Medusa Film; Opera Film Produzione
- Distributed by: Medusa Distribuzione
- Release date: 5 January 2001
- Running time: 117 minutes
- Country: Italy
- Language: Italian
- Budget: $4,000,000

Sleepless (Italian: Non ho sonno, lit. 'I can't sleep') is a 2001 Italian giallo film directed, co-written, and co-produced by Dario Argento. It stars Max von Sydow, Stefano Dionisi, Chiara Caselli, Roberto Zibetti and Gabriele Lavia.

The film marks Argento's return to the giallo genre. Sleepless received mixed reviews, but was a box office success when it opened in Italy, taking in over 5,019,733,505 lira ($3,280,080 US) by the end of its theatrical run.

== Plot ==
Angela, a prostitute, has just had sex with a man now cowering under the bedsheets and angrily harassing her over not being fully satisfied due to shame. As Angela gets her things, she knocks over a chest filled with bladed weapons, scaring her into fleeing. Unwittingly taking a blue envelope with her, she finds it is full of newspaper clippings and memorabilia about the murders committed by an unidentified serial killer in Turin, nicknamed "The Dwarf Killer". The unseen client from before calls Angela and threatens to kill her. She calls her friend Amanda to retrieve the envelope from her at the station. The killer, who has followed Angela onto the train, chases her and cuts off her finger before slashing her throat. After Angela does not meet her at the station, Amanda boards the train and finds Angela's gold pin and the envelope. She narrowly avoids getting stuck on the train and takes the envelope with her to her car. The killer follows her and stabs her to death in the driver's seat before taking the envelope back.

Retired detective Ulisse Moretti (Max von Sydow), the primary investigator of the original series of murders in 1983, has been keeping in close contact with Giacomo Gallo, the only survivor of the original spree, who saw his mother, Maria, stabbed to death with her own English horn. The first three killings in the spree became known as The Dwarf Murders because the main suspect, Vincenzo de Fabritiis, was a crime author with dwarfism, but he died of natural causes, and the case was considered closed. Moretti was never fully convinced of Fabrittis' guilt. Giacomo has taken years to cope with the trauma of his mother's murder, and gaps in his memory of it haunt him. Giacomo's girlfriend Gloria and his best friend Lorenzo Betti have just returned from their time studying abroad, arranged by Lorenzo's wealthy father.

The killings continue to escalate. As nightclub dancer Mel is leaving work, the killer ambushes her. Dragging her to an indoor fountain during a lengthy struggle, he drowns Mel, then aggressively cuts her fingernails very short after she scratched him. Moretti starts trying to solve the case, joined by Giacomo. The differing modus operandi and much larger range in location of the recent murders compared to those in 1983 puzzle them both.

Cab driver Beppe finds an engraved pen belonging to the killer and blackmails him into arranging a meeting, where he is stabbed to death. Giacomo questions de Fabritiis' friend Leone, an alcoholic who also has dwarfism, who lives at the De Fabritiis home. Vincent's mother Laura, still grieving the death and slander of her son, receives Moretti coldly.

The killer murders another woman, Dora, by slamming her face against a wall hard enough to knock her teeth out. While conversing with his pet parrot, Moretti goes over the murders and realizes the modus operandi and the animal-shaped paper tokens left at each murder scene match the violence in a disturbing nursery rhyme, "The Crazy Farmer". He theorizes the killer went mad after hallucinating the noises of the animals, and notes that a swan is the final animal to die. Giacomo rushes to the ballet, fearing for the life of Gloria, who is performing the music from Swan Lake on her harp in a swan costume, but she is safe. The killer violently beheads Mara, the ballet dancer portraying Odette, instead.

Vincent's grave is opened and his casket discovered to be empty, with marks indicating the body was recently taken. Laura confesses to Moretti that she killed Vincent at his own request when the persecution of the public got to be too much to bear. Alone at home, she sees a shadowy figure she believes is Vincent before falling in terror over a banister to her death. At Moretti's home, just after he leaves an answering machine message to Giacomo about a break in the case, the same figure appears and recites the nursery rhyme, frightening Moretti into a fatal heart attack.

Giacomo and Gloria see Leone carrying a life-sized dwarf puppet and follow him to a house where they discover a workshop filled with puppets and Leone dead of a deep wound to his face. Betti's father appears and shoots Giacomo in his shoulder. After changing his mind about killing Giacomo, he apologizes to Lorenzo, who has arrived with Gloria, and shoots himself in the head. Giacomo realizes the killer in both series of murders was the same person, and not a dwarf, but a child in 1983, and now an adult able to kill in a much wider area.

Giacomo confronts the killer, Lorenzo, realizing the hissing sound he heard during his mother Marta's murder was Lorenzo's asthma inhaler. Mr. Betti sent Lorenzo out of the country to stop him, then killed Leone when he was sure Lorenzo was killing again. Lorenzo smugly confesses he doesn't care that his father is dead, and was glad to return for the "game" of Giacomo trying to catch him. Lorenzo was driven mad by hallucinating animal noises coming from women and killing them accordingly based on the Crazy Farmer rhyme. His victims did not fear him in 1983 because of his young age, and when he went to Geneva and New York City, he slaughtered more people since the nursery rhyme was known internationally.

When Giacomo tries to grab a kitchen knife, Lorenzo pulls his own knife on Gloria and threatens to kill her if he doesn't leave. Giacomo complies long enough for Lorenzo to near a window, where the detective on the case shoots Betti through the face, killing him instantly. The police raid the apartment while Giacomo consoles Gloria.

== Cast ==
- Max von Sydow as Ulisse Moretti
- Stefano Dionisi as Giacomo Gallo
- Chiara Caselli as Gloria
- Roberto Zibetti as Lorenzo Betti
- Gabriele Lavia as Dr. Betti
- Paolo Maria Scalondro as Chief Inspector Manni
- Rossella Falk as Laura de Fabritiis
- Roberto Accornero as Fausto
- Barbara Lerici as Angela
- Guido Morbello as Young Detective
- Massimo Sarchielli as Leone
- Diego Casale as Beppe
- Alessandra Comerio as Mrs. Betti
- Elena Marchesini as Mel
- Aldo Massasso as Detective Cascio
- Conchita Puglisi as Amanda
- Barbara Mautino as Dora
- Luca Fagioli as Vincenzo de Fabritiis
- Daniela Fazzolari as Maria Luisa
- Rossella Lucà as Mara

== Critical reception ==
Sleepless received a mixed response from critics. On film review aggregator website Rotten Tomatoes the film has an approval rating of 55% based on 11 reviews, and is certified "rotten". BBC Online wrote, "If this movie commits one crime, it's that the rest of it is never quite as good as the bravura opening. Don't let your guard down, though, because there are some cruelly well executed set-pieces that are enrobed in a constant sense of dread." AllMovie gave the film a generally negative review, writing, "this feels like an Argento retread – the murder mystery recalls his 1971 Cat o' Nine Tails a little too much, and the overly familiar horrific elements (pace, editing, music, screaming) have little impact."

== Home media ==
The film was released on Blu-Ray and 4K Blu-Ray by Vinegar Syndrome in November 2025.
