= Mia (film) =

2023 drama film

- Directed by: Ivano De Matteo
- Screenplay by: Ivano De Matteo; Valentina Ferlan
- Starring: Edoardo Leo; Milena Mancini; Greta Gasbarri
- Cinematography: Giuseppe Maio
- Edited by: Giuliana Sarli
- Music by: Francesco Cerasi
- Release date: 2023
- Language: Italian

Mia is a 2023 Italian drama film co-written and directed by Ivano De Matteo and starring Edoardo Leo, Milena Mancini and Greta Gasbarri.

== Plot ==
Rome, Ostiense neighborhood. Sergio, an ambulance driver, and Valeria are a close-knit couple with an only teenage daughter, Mia. Twenty-year-old Marco suddenly enters their life and becomes Mia's first boyfriend. Marco immediately reveals himself to be a manipulator, disrupting the fifteen-year-old's life by monitoring her phone, distancing her from sports, school, and friends. Gradually, his controlling attitude toward Mia also begins to impact her behavior and habits. She stops wearing makeup, dresses in a way that hides her body from others, and is constantly in touch with Marco, who texts and calls her constantly, criticizing and disdaining everyone else she goes out with.

One night, on the pretext of the Marco's birthday, the boy convinces Mia to run away from home to spend the night with him in his parents' beach house (an element which confirms the boy's high social status). Here Marco insists that Mia drink alcohol, and then rapes her, Marco subsequently abandons her at a gas station.

The girl, helped by her determined and caring father, manages to end the highly toxic and violent relationship in which she ended up, and starts living her life again by avoiding responding to Marco's messages and phone calls but the boy, after Mia's calls are rejected and on the first occasion in which the latter goes out to drink a coffee with another boy, Marco begins to spread photos and videos through social media that portray her naked the night they were together. Devastated, the girl attempts suicide out of desperation and remains in a coma. The father, destroyed by pain and guilt, faced with the inefficiency of justice (Marco is reported but the process seems to be going slowly), comes to the conclusion that only one thing remains: revenge against him.

== Cast ==
- Edoardo Leo as Sergio
- Milena Mancini as Valeria
- Greta Gasbarri as Mia
- Riccardo Mandolini as Marco
- Vinicio Marchioni as Marco's father
- Giorgio Montanini as Piero
- Alessia Manicastri as Anna
- Giorgia Faraoni as Veronica

== Production ==
The film was produced by produced by Lotus in collaboration with Rai Cinema. It was shot in Rome between January and February 2022.

== Release ==
The film premiered at the 14th Bari International Film Festival. It was released on Italian cinemas by 01 Distribution on 6 April 2023.

== Reception ==
The film was awarded two Globo d'oro Awards for best screenplay and best actor (Leo), and won the Ciak d'Oro for best drama film. It was also nominated for three Silver Ribbons, for best original story, best actor (Leo) and best supporting actress (Milena Mancini).
