= The Best Film You've Never Seen =

2013 book of film director interviews

- First edition
- Author: Robert K. Elder
- Publisher: Chicago Review Press
- Publication date: 2013
- Preceded by: The Film That Changed My Life

The Best Film You've Never Seen: 35 Directors Champion the Forgotten or Critically Savaged Movies They Love is a book by the journalist and editor Robert K. Elder.

== Synopsis ==
Published in 2013, the book features interviews with 35 directors about lesser-known movies that influenced them. This is the companion to his previous book, The Film That Changed My Life.

== Interviews ==
The directors include:

- John Woo (Le Samouraï)
- Danny Boyle (Eureka)
- John Dahl (Twin Peaks: Fire Walk with Me)
- Guillermo del Toro (Arcane Sorcerer)
- Rian Johnson (Under the Volcano)
- Jay Duplass (Joe Versus the Volcano)
- Richard Linklater (Some Came Running)
- John Waters (Boom!)
- Kevin Smith (A Man for All Seasons)
- Peter Bogdanovich (Trouble in Paradise)
- Edgar Wright (The Super Cops)
- Bill Condon (Sweet Charity)
- Alex Proyas (The Swimmer)
- Frank Oz (The Trial)

== Reception ==
Reviews of the book have praised both Elder's interviewing style and the depth of information included in the book.
