= Pa-ra-da =

- Directed by: Marco Pontecorvo
- Screenplay by: Marco Pontecorvo; Roberto Tiraboschi
- Produced by: Ute Leonhardt; Marco Valerio Pugini
- Starring: Jalil Lespert
- Cinematography: Vincenzo Carpineta
- Edited by: Alessio Doglione
- Music by: Andrea Guerra
- Release date: 2008
- Countries: Italy; France; Romania
- Languages: Romanian; French

Pa-ra-da, also graphically rendered as PA-RA-DA, is a 2008 biographical drama film co-written and directed by Marco Pontecorvo, in his feature directorial debut. Based on life events of French-Algerian clown Miloud Oukili, it premiered at the 65th Venice International Film Festival.

== Cast ==
- Jalil Lespert as Miloud
- Evita Ciri as Livia
- Gabriel Rauta as Mihai
- Patrice Juiff as Stephane
- Daniele Formica as Don Guido
- Robert Valeanu as Cristi
- Cristina Nita as Tea
- Liviu Bituc as Mosu
- Florin Precup as Vlad
- Andreea Perminov as Alina

== Production ==
The film is based on the real-life story of street clown Miloud Oukili, who founded a circus company in Bucharest made up of orphaned and abandoned children. The film was produced by Panorama Films, with Rai Cinema serving as co-producer, and was shot in nine weeks in Bucharest.

== Release ==
The film premiered at the 65th edition of the Venice Film Festival, as the opening film of the Orizzonti sidebar. It was theatrically released in Italy on 19 September 2008.

== Reception ==
The film won the Audience Award at the Mar del Plata International Film Festival. For this film Pontecorvo was nominated for the David di Donatello for best new director and for the Nastro d'Argento in the same category. Ray Bennett on The Hollywood Reporter called it "engaging" while being able to "steer clear of the sentimental pitfalls".
