= Birdwatchers (film) =

2008 film by Marco Bechis

- Film poster
- Directed by: Marco Bechis
- Written by: Marco Bechis; Luiz Bolognesi
- Produced by: Amedeo Pagani; Marco Bechis; Fabiano Gullane; Caio Gullane
- Starring: Claudio Santamaria; Alicélia Batista Cabreira; Chiara Caselli
- Cinematography: Hélico Alemão Nagamine
- Edited by: Jacopo Quadri
- Music by: Andrea Guerra
- Production companies: Classic; Rai Cinema; Karta Film; Gullane Filmes
- Distributed by: 01 Distribution (Italy); Paris Filmes (Brazil)
- Release dates: 1 September 2008 (Venice); 28 November 2008
- Running time: 104 minutes
- Countries: Italy; Brazil
- Languages: Portuguese; Guarani; English
- Budget: €3 million
- Box office: $7,263

Birdwatchers (Italian: La terra degli uomini rossi) is a 2008 Brazilian-Italian drama film directed by Marco Bechis and starring Claudio Santamaria, Alicélia Batista Cabreira, and Chiara Caselli. It depicts the breakdown of a community of Guarani-Kaiowa native Indians whilst attempting to reclaim their ancestral land from a local farmer.

== Plot ==
A boat with tourists is sailing through the jungle. Suddenly they come face-to-face with Indians, naked apart from their paint, with self-made weapons at the ready. The tourists sail on excitedly. The Indians put on their jeans and collect their wages.

The Guarani, one of Brazil's oldest Indian communities, are forced to live in a reservation. A small group decide to leave and settle in a traditional territory that has belonged to white men for several generations.

== Cast ==
- Claudio Santamaria as Roberto
- Alicélia Batista Cabreira as Lia
- Chiara Caselli as Beatrice
- Abrísio da Silva Pedro as Osvaldo
- Ademilson Concianza Verga as Irineu
- Ambrósio Vilhalva as Nádio
- Matheus Nachtergaele as Dimas
- Fabiane Pereira da Silva as Maria
- Eliane Juca da Silva as Mami
- Nelson Concianza as Nhanderu
- Leonardo Medeiros as Moreira
- Inéia Arce Gonçalves as maid
- Poli Fernandez Souza as Tito
- Urbano Palácio as Josimar

== Production ==
The film was shot in Dourados, Mato Grosso do Sul over ten weeks in 2007 with a cast whose most members had never acted before and without use of a script.

The songs "Sacris solemnis" and "O gloriosa virginum" were composed by the Italian Jesuit Domenico Zipoli who went to South America to live at the Jesuit reductions.

== Reception ==
On review aggregator website Rotten Tomatoes, the film holds an approval rating of 96% based on 25 reviews, with an average rating of 6.8/10.

== Awards ==
- 2010 One World Media Award in the Drama category, by unanimous vote of the jury.

== See also ==
- Survival International
