= Andrzej Blumenfeld =

Polish actor

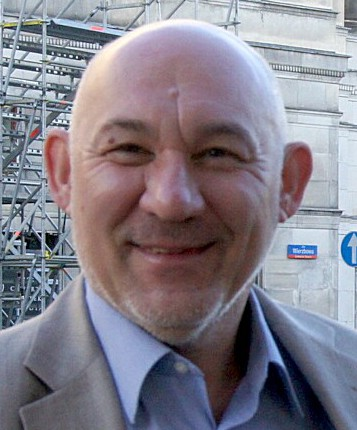
- Andrzej Blumenfeld
- Born: Andrzej Stanisław Blumenfeld; 12 August 1951; Zabrze, Silesia, Poland
- Died: 14 August 2017 (aged 66); Poland
- Occupations: Actor, Voice actor
- Years active: 19??–2017

Andrzej Stanisław Blumenfeld (12 August 1951 – 14 August 2017) was a Polish film, television, and voice actor who worked for SDI Media Polska.

== Filmography ==
- The Young Magician (1987) - Teacher
- Legend of the White Horse (1987) - Bartan
- Dekalog: Four (1988) - Stawinski
- A Tale of Adam Mickiewicz's 'Forefathers' Eve' (1989) - Writer
- Kornblumenblau (1989) - Flecista
- 1968. Szczesliwego Nowego Roku (1992) - Major
- Pierscionek z orlem w koronie (1992)
- Prowokator (1995) - Struwe
- Pulkownik Kwiatkowski (1995) - Army surgeon
- Wezwanie (1997)
- Kiler-ów 2-óch (1997) - Celejski
- Thomas and the Falcon King (2000) - Balador (voice)
- Prymas – trzy lata z tysiąca (2000) - Herbert
- Where Eskimos Live (2002) - Taxi Driver
- The Pianist (2002) - Benek
- Zróbmy sobie wnuka (2003) - Apartment Owner
- Pope John Paul II (2005, TV Mini-Series) - Gierek Edward
- Expecting Love (2003) - Client
- Idealny facet dla mojej dziewczyny (2009) - Milena's father
- Little Rose (2010) - Malkiewicz
- Ojciec Mateusz (2012–2014, TV Series) - Smieszkowski / Emil Grabski
- Delivery Man (2013) - Mikolaj
- Carte Blanche (2015) - Florczak
- Bangistan (2015) - Wilfred
- Persona Non Grata (2015) - Chaim Rosenthal
- Bikini Blue (2017) - Blind Friend
- Mute (2018) - Akim
- Teatroteka: Sprawa Rity G. (2018) - Judge (final film role)

=== Dubbing roles ===
==== Animation ====
Film
| Year | Title | Role | Notes |
|---|---|---|---|
| 1986 | The Great Mouse Detective | Professor Ratigan | |
| 1986 | An American Tail | Honest John | |
| 1988 | Oliver & Company | Fagin | |
| 2000 | Help! I'm a Fish | Crab | |
| 2001 | Scooby-Doo and the Cyber Chase | Officer Wembley | |
| 2002 | Return to Never Land | Captain Hook | |
| 2002 | Ice Age | Soto | |
| 2006 | Brother Bear 2 | Chilkoot | |
| 2007 | Ratatouille | Mustafa | |
| 2008 | WALL-E | John | |
| 2014 | Teenage Mutant Ninja Turtles: Out of the Shadows | Krang | |

==== Television ====
- The Avengers: Earth's Mightiest Heroes - Leader, Mad Thinker, Man-Ape
- The Batman - Hugo Strange
- Batman: The Brave and the Bold - Kanjar Ro, Merlin, Despero, Shrapnel, Slug
- G.I. Joe: Renegades - Cobra Commander
- Hulk and the Agents of S.M.A.S.H. - Abomination, Super-Skrull
- Justice League Unlimited - General Wade Eiling, Ares
- Merry Madagascar - Santa Claus
- Spider-Man - Kraven the Hunter

==== Video games ====
- Afterfall: Insanity - Colonel Henryk Potocki
- God of War: Ghost of Sparta - Thanatos
- Gwent: The Witcher Card Game - Sigismund Dijkstra
- Infamous 2 - Joseph Bertrand III
- Syberia 3 - Helmut Mangöling
- Uncharted - Victor Sullivan
- The Witcher - Jacques de Aldersberg
- The Witcher 3: Wild Hunt - Sigismund Dijkstra
