= Traces of an Amorous Life =

1990 film

- Directed by: Peter Del Monte
- Starring: Luciano Bartoli; Giorgio Biavati; Giovanna Bozzolo; Simona Caramelli; Chiara Caselli; Walter Chiari; George Claisse; Massimo Dapporto; Roberto De Francesco; Stefano Dionisi; Gioele Dix; Valeria Golino; Angela Goodwin; Giovanni Guidelli; Roberto Herlitzka; Alberto Melis; Valeria Milillo; Laura Morante; Andrea Occhipinti; Roberto Picca; Claudia Pozzi; Leonardo Ruta; Fabrizia Sacchi; Stefania Sandrelli; Renato Scarpa; Andrea Toffoli; Ursula Von Baechler
- Cinematography: Alessandro Pesci
- Edited by: Simona Paggi
- Music by: Ennio Morricone; Nicola Piovani
- Release date: 1990
- Country: Italy
- Language: Italian

Traces of an Amorous Life (Italian: Tracce di vita amorosa) is a 1990 Italian romantic drama film directed by Peter Del Monte. It entered the competition at the 47th Venice International Film Festival.

== Cast ==
- Luciano Bartoli as the boss
- Valeria Golino as Lucia Fontana
- Walter Chiari as Giorgio
- Chiara Caselli as Carla
- Laura Morante as Agnese
- Massimo Dapporto as Mario
- Roberto De Francesco as Luigi
- Roberto Herlitzka as the teacher
- Valeria Milillo as Lisa
- Andrea Occhipinti as Agnese
- Claudia Pozzi as Arianna, the secretary
- Stefano Dionisi as the petty thief
- Gioele Dix as the businessman
- Giovanni Guidelli as Lisa's ex-boyfriend
- Fabrizia Sacchi as Beatrice
- Stefania Sandrelli as woman in department store
- Renato Scarpa as Giuseppe Breschi
