= The Film That Changed My Life =

2011 book by Robert K. Elder

The Film That Changed My Life: 30 Directors on Their Epiphanies in the Dark
- Author: Robert K. Elder
- Language: English
- Genre: Non-fiction
- Publisher: Chicago Review Press
- Publication date: 1 January 2011
- Publication place: United States
- Media type: Print (Paperback)
- Pages: 304
- ISBN: 978-1-55652-825-5

The Film That Changed My Life (also known as The Film That Changed My Life: 30 Directors on Their Epiphanies in the Dark) is a non-fiction collection of interviews compiled by American journalist, author and film columnist Robert K. Elder. The book presents interviews with thirty famous directors who share stories about the movies that affected their career paths and directing styles.

== Chapter list ==
1. Edgar Wright on An American Werewolf in London
2. Rian Johnson on Annie Hall
3. Danny Boyle on Apocalypse Now
4. Bill Condon on Bonnie and Clyde
5. Richard Kelly on Brazil
6. Peter Bogdanovich on Citizen Kane
7. John Dahl on A Clockwork Orange
8. Henry Jaglom on 8½
9. Brian Herzlinger on E.T.: The Extra-Terrestrial
10. Alex Gibney on The Exterminating Angel
11. Kimberly Peirce on The Godfather
12. Steve James on Harlan County, USA
13. Austin Chick on Kings of the Road
14. Guy Maddin on L'âge d'Or
15. Michel Gondry on Le voyage en ballon
16. Michael Polish on Once Upon a Time in America
17. Arthur Hiller on Rome, Open City
18. Pete Docter on Paper Moon
19. Atom Egoyan on Persona
20. Gurinder Chadha on Purab aur Pachhim and It's a Wonderful Life
21. Richard Linklater on Raging Bull
22. Jay Duplass on Raising Arizona
23. John Woo on Rebel Without a Cause and Mean Streets
24. John Landis on The 7th Voyage of Sinbad
25. Kevin Smith on Slacker
26. Chris Miller on Sleeper
27. Neil LaBute on The Soft Skin
28. George A. Romero on The Tales of Hoffmann
29. Frank Oz on Touch of Evil
30. John Waters on The Wizard of Oz

== See also ==
- The Best Film You've Never Seen
