= Sabato italiano =

- Directed by: Luciano Manuzzi
- Written by: Luciano Manuzzi; Marco Tullio Giordana; Angelo Pasquini; Pier Vittorio Tondelli
- Produced by: Claudio Bonivento
- Cinematography: Fabio Cianchetti
- Music by: Oscar Prudente
- Release date: 8 August 1992
- Country: Italy
- Language: Italian

Sabato italiano (Italian Saturday) is a 1992 Italian drama film directed by Luciano Manuzzi.

== Cast ==
- Francesca Neri: Marina
- Chiara Caselli: Angela
- Isabelle Pasco: Danielle
- Stefano Dionisi: Ricky
- Yvonne Sciò: Violante
- Francesco Barilli: Roberto / The Boss
- Massimo Di Cataldo: Enzo

== See also ==
- List of Italian films of 1992
