= Yara (2021 film) =

- Poster
- Directed by: Marco Tullio Giordana
- Written by: Graziano Diana
- Starring: Chiara Bono; Isabella Ragonese; Alessio Boni; Roberto Zibetti
- Cinematography: Roberto Forza
- Music by: Andrea Farri
- Release date: 5 November 2021
- Running time: 96 minutes
- Country: Italy
- Language: Italian

Yara is a 2021 Italian true crime drama film directed by Marco Tullio Giordana, written by Graziano Diana and starring Chiara Bono, Isabella Ragonese, Alessio Boni and Roberto Zibetti. Based on a true story, the film follows an Italian prosecutor and her attempts to find the killer of 13-year-old Yara Gambirasio. The film was released by Netflix on November 5, 2021.

== Cast ==
- Chiara Bono as Yara Gambirasio
- Isabella Ragonese
- Alessio Boni
- Roberto Zibetti as Massimo Bossetti
- Aiman Machhour as Mohamed Fikri
- Mario Pirrello
- Sandra Toffolatti
- Thomas Trabacchi
- Lorenzo Acquaviva as Avvocato Claudio Salvagni
- Donatella Bartoli as Yara School Teacher
- Andrea Bruschi
- Guglielmo Favilla as Tenente Colonnello Emiliani
- Nicole Fornaro as Yara Gym Teacher
- Miro Landoni
