= Partly Cloudy with Sunny Spells =

2015 Itialian comedy film by Marco Pontecorvo

- Italian: Tempo instabile con probabili schiarite
- Directed by: Marco Pontecorvo
- Written by: Marco Pontecorvo; Roberto Tiraboschi
- Produced by: Ute Leonhardt, Marco Valerio Pugini
- Starring: Luca Zingaretti; Lillo Petrolo; Carolina Crescentini; John Turturro
- Cinematography: Vincenzo Carpineta
- Edited by: Alessio Doglione
- Music by: Francesco De Luca; Alessandro Forti
- Distributed by: Good Films (Italy), Palace Films (Australia)
- Release date: February 15, 2015 (Los Angeles Italian Film Festival)
- Running time: 95 minutes
- Country: Italy
- Language: Italian

Partly Cloudy with Sunny Spells (Italian: Tempo instabile con probabili schiarite) is a 2015 comedy film written and directed by Marco Pontecorvo and starring Luca Zingaretti, Lillo Petrolo, Carolina Crescentini and John Turturro.

== Plot ==
On the border between Emilia-Romagna and the Marche, a business that produces sofas faces bankruptcy. The founders are two friends: Ermanno and Giacomo. Ermanno has a wife, Elena, and a son, Tito, 17, who lives immersed in the world of Japanese comics. Giacomo lives with his son Gabriele, an 18-year-old baseball fan. One night, Ermanno and Giacomo, digging a hole in the yard, discover something surprising: oil coming from the subsoil. This extraordinary event will create contradictions and conflicts, showing the worst side of the protagonists.

== Cast ==
- Luca Zingaretti as Giacomo
- Lillo Petrolo as Ermanno
- Carolina Crescentini as Paola
- John Turturro as engineer Lombelli
- Lorenza Indovina as Elena
- Paola Lavini as Marisa
- Franco Mescolini as Cecco
- Andrea Arcangeli as Tito
- Romano Reggiani as Gabriele
- Giorgio Montanini as Brugnotti

== See also ==
- List of Italian films of 2015
