= The Secret (1990 film) =

1990 film

- Film poster
- Directed by: Francesco Maselli
- Written by: Francesco Maselli
- Produced by: Giuseppe Giovannini
- Starring: Nastassja Kinski; Franco Citti; Stefano Dionisi; Chiara Caselli
- Cinematography: Pier Luigi Santi
- Edited by: Carla Simoncelli
- Music by: Giovanna Marini
- Release date: February 1990
- Running time: 110 minutes
- Country: Italy
- Language: Italian
- Box office: $106,000 (Italy)

The Secret (Italian: Il segreto) is a 1990 Italian drama film directed by Francesco Maselli. It was entered into the 40th Berlin International Film Festival.

== Cast ==
- Nastassja Kinski as Lucia
- Stefano Dionisi as Carlo
- Franco Citti as Franco
- Chiara Caselli as Lilli
- Alessandra Marson
- Franca Scagnetti
- Raffaela Davi
- Enzo Saturini
- Antonio de Giorgi
- Michela Bruni
- Luigi Diberti
- Maria Giovanna Delfino
