= The Milk Train Doesn't Stop Here Anymore =

Play written by Tennessee Williams

- First US production program
- Written by: Tennessee Williams
- Setting: Italy

Premiere
- Date: 1963

The Milk Train Doesn't Stop Here Anymore (1963) is a play in a prologue and six scenes, written by Tennessee Williams. He told John Gruen in 1965 that it was "the play that I worked on longest," and he premiered a version of it at the Festival dei Due Mondi in Spoleto, Italy, in July 1962.

== Plot ==
The play is set in Italy and centers on an elderly, wealthy, oft-married woman, Mrs. Flora Goforth, who lives in a remote villa with her stenographer, Catherine "Blackie" Black, a recently widowed Vassar graduate whom she dictates her memoirs to; a sadistic bodyguard, Rudy, who keeps a pack of vicious watch dogs; and a retinue of servants. Informed by a doctor that she has Cancer, Mrs. Goforth is dying, but refuses to face the reality of her condition. A young man, Christopher Flanders, is caught trespassing on Mrs. Goforth's estate, his clothes torn by Rudy's guard dogs. Christopher, a once promising poet who has not written in years and now spends his time assembling mobiles instead, recalls meeting Mrs. Goforth at a charity event years earlier, but she claims not to remember him. Regardless, Mrs. Goforth is sexually attracted to Christopher and lets him remain with her at the villa. Mrs. Goforth is visited by her frenemy, the Witch of Capri, who informs her that Christopher is known to people in society as the "Angel of Death", as, according to her, he is a sort of hustler who preys on lonely, elderly patrons that die shortly after taking him up. On Mrs. Goforth's deathbed, Christopher tells her that after spending time in India, he decided that he would dedicate his life to helping people come to terms with their own mortality. Ultimately, Mrs. Goforth dies after Christopher helps her accept her own death. The play ends with a somewhat brusque Christopher toasting Blackie, leaving the audience or reader to question whether he was actually a genuine mystic, or a cynical con-artist.

== Development ==
The play was based on a short story of Williams' called "Man Bring This Up the Road" which he wrote in Italy when he was working on the film Senso. Williams continued working on the story when he returned to the USA by which time it morphed into a play. It had its debut at Gian-Carlo Menotti’s Festival of Two Worlds in Spoleto, Italy, in 1961 starring Hermione Baddeley.

== Production history ==
Its first American production was in January 1963 on Broadway at the Morosco Theatre, starring Hermione Baddeley and produced by Roger Stevens. Reviews of the play were poor, although a newspaper strike prevented them from reaching audiences; the play ran for only 69 performances. Noël Coward saw a production and said "I found it so intolerable and Hermione Baddeley’s acting so vulgar that I left after about twenty minutes and went home."

Williams revised the script for a second production, giving it a kabuki framework, with two actors playing stagehands who comment on the play as it happens. This new production was produced by David Merrick. It opened on January 1, 1964 at the Brooks Atkinson Theatre under the direction of Tony Richardson. It starred Tallulah Bankhead (the part had originally been written for and was loosely based on Bankhead) and Tab Hunter, with Marian Seldes.

Richardson said " I loved doing a new play, especially an American play. I was flattered to be asked, and already thought of becoming a hero by creating success out of failure."

Williams and Merrick wanted Bankhead and Richardson would only agree if they agreed to Tab Hunter in the male lead. Williams was reluctant "since I could not see in Tab a mystic and ambiguous quality which the part demanded" but Richardson said he had a "moral obligation" to Hunter. "I can only surmise what the 'moral obligation' may have been, and I shall leave you in the same uncertainty," wrote Williams. Williams later wrote Hunter "showed more talent than I would have expected, but an ambivalent mysticism was not so apparent in his performance as a lingering talent for exposing his skin and physique."

Hunter said he was recommended by the first choice for the role, Anthony Perkins, who was unable to do the play. Hunter found working with Bankhead difficult, saying "What pissed me off was Tallulah's complete lack of professionalism, her inability to see beyond herself, beyond her reputation. She was dissipating an incredible God-given talent, especially when she'd decide to turn anything — anything — into high camp."

It ran for only five performances after again receiving poor notices. The 2011 revival starring Olympia Dukakis was directed by Michael Wilson.

In 1968, the play was adapted by Williams into the film Boom!, co-starring Elizabeth Taylor and Richard Burton, and directed by Joseph Losey. The film was a disastrous vehicle for both stars.

Williams later wrote "If you write a play with a very strong female role, such as Flora Goforth of The Milk Train Doesn't Stop Here Anymore, it is likely to surface repeatedly, since female stars of a certain age have a rough time finding vehicles suitable to their talents, personalities, and their public images."

In 1987, the play was revived at WPA Theatre in New York City.

== Bibliography ==
- Williams, Tennessee. (2014). Suddenly Last Summer and other plays. Penguin Books Ltd.

== Notes ==
- Richardson, Tony (1993). The long-distance runner.
- Williams, Tennessee (1975). Memoirs.
