= Adrianna Biedrzyńska =

Polish actress (born 1962)

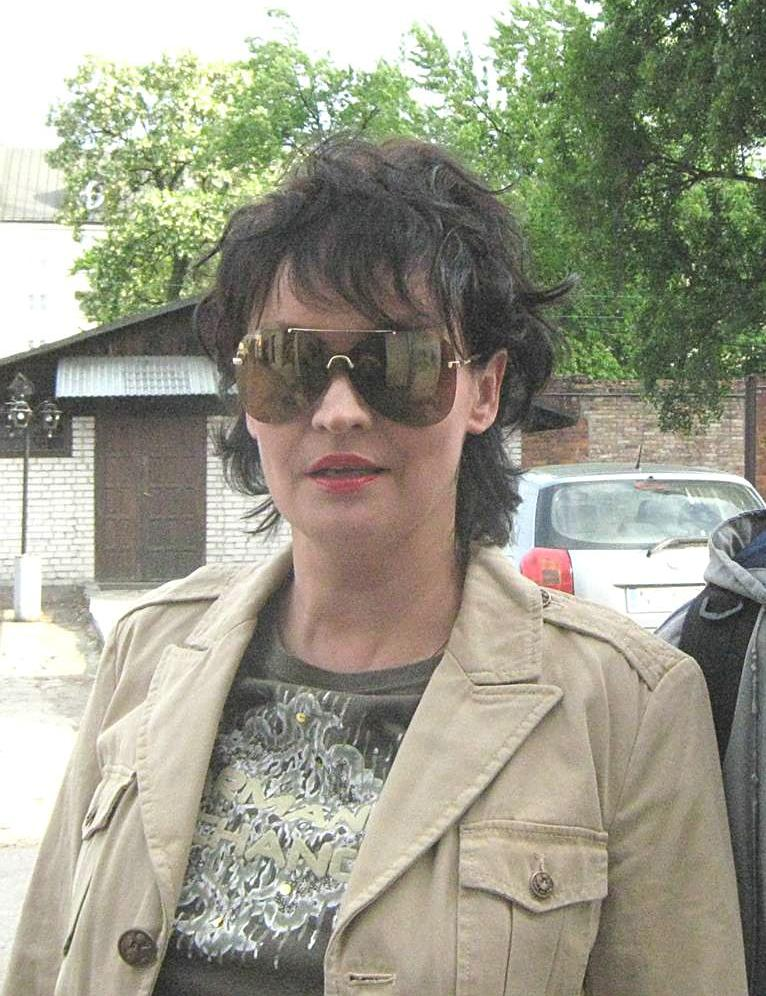
Adrianna Biedrzyńska in 2009

Adrianna Biedrzyńska (born 30 March 1962, in Toruń, Poland) is a Polish actress. She performed in more than thirty films since 1983. She is best known for her performance as Anka in Decalogue IV.

She works well in both dramatic and comedy roles, although the actress herself admits that she feels better in comic roles. In 2008, she made a guest appearance in Katowice at the Rialto Kinoteater in the title role in the musical comedy for children Flea Szachrajka, in which she was partnered with, among others, Rafał Sawicki.

In her theater work, she had the opportunity to collaborate, among others with directors such as Janusz Bukowski, Adam Hanuszkiewicz, Barbara Sass. Critics positively assessed her role as Marina in Pericles, the ruler of Tire (1984), although the performance itself was not successful.

== Selected filmography ==
Film
Year	Title	Role	Notes
1988	Decalogue IV	Anka	
1988	Hanussen	Wally	
1989	300 Miles to Heaven	Journalist	
1992	Un'altra vita	Alia	
