= Nero (1992 film) =

- Directed by: Giancarlo Soldi
- Screenplay by: Tiziano Sclavi; Giancarlo Soldi
- Based on: Nero. by Tiziano Sclavi
- Produced by: Giovanna Romagnoli
- Starring: Sergio Castellitto; Chiara Caselli; Carlo Colnaghi; Luis Molteni; Hugo Pratt
- Cinematography: Luca Bigazzi
- Edited by: Mauro Bonanni
- Music by: Francesco Guccini; Mau Mau
- Production company: Produzioni Intersound
- Distributed by: Titanus Distribuzione
- Release dates: 6 September 1992 (Venice Film Festival); 18 September 1992 (Italy)
- Running time: 100 minutes
- Country: Italy
- Language: Italian

Nero. is a 1992 Italian black comedy crime film co-written and directed by Giancarlo Soldi. Starring Sergio Castellitto and Chiara Caselli, the screenplay was written by Tiziano Sclavi from a novel of the same name. It follows Frederico and Francesca as they struggle to find a suitably quiet place while carrying Francesca's former boyfriend Zardo cut in pieces in a suitcase.

== Plot synopsis ==
Frederico's new girlfriend Francesca may have killed her former boyfriend by slitting his throat. Her lover, Frederico, who believes her guilty, tries to help her by making her corpse disappear. But the body really disappears, passing from the trunk of one car to another. His name was Zardo.

Assuming that Francesca killed her former boyfriend and sent him for cleaning up, Frederico cuts him up in pieces, puts him in a suitcase and tries to get rid of it, but he has a hard time finding a suitably quiet place. Unfortunately there's a witness, who comes back on him. One thing leads to another, and the normally shy and overly fearful Frederico has to rid himself of more and more corpses until the film ends.

== Cast ==
- Sergio Castellitto as Frederico
- Chiara Caselli as Francesca
- Carlo Colnaghi as Contadino
- Luis Molteni as D'Ambrosi
- Hugo Pratt as the Foreign Commissioner

== Release ==
Nero. premiered in the Venice Film Festival on 6 September 1992, and was released in Italy by Titanus Distribuzione on 18 September 1992. It has since acquired a cult following.
