= The Peaceful Air of the West =

- Directed by: Silvio Soldini
- Written by: Silvio Soldini and Roberto Tiraboschi
- Cinematography: Luca Bigazzi
- Music by: Giovanni Venosta
- Release date: 1990
- Country: Italy
- Language: Italian

The Peaceful Air of the West (Italian: L'aria serena dell'ovest) is a 1990 Italian comedy film directed by Silvio Soldini.

== Cast ==
- Fabrizio Bentivoglio: Cesare
- Patrizia Piccinini: Veronica
- Antonella Fattori: Irene
- Ivano Marescotti: Tobia
- Silli Togni: Clara
- Roberto Accornero: Mario
