= Un'altra vita =

- Directed by: Carlo Mazzacurati
- Cinematography: Alessandro Pesci
- Music by: Ralph Towner
- Release date: 1992
- Country: Italy

Un'altra vita (Another Life) is a 1992 Italian comedy drama film directed by Carlo Mazzacurati.

For his performance Claudio Amendola won the David di Donatello for best supporting actor.

== Cast ==
- Silvio Orlando: Saverio
- Adrianna Biedrzyńska: Alia
- Claudio Amendola: Mauro
- Antonello Fassari: Remo
- Monica Scattini: Luisanna
- Pasquale Anselmo: Jacobino
- Giorgio Tirabassi: Vanni
- Luisa De Santis: Assistant of Saverio
- Kim Rossi Stuart: Luciano
- Antonella Ponziani: Rita
- Maciej Robakiewicz: Lev
