= Robert K. Elder =

American journalist, author, and film columnist (born 1976)

- Born: January 20, 1976 (age 50); United States
- Occupations: Publisher, Journalist, author, film columnist
- Writing career
- Language: English
- Genres: Journalism, film

Robert K. Elder (born January 20, 1976) is an American journalist, author, and film columnist. He is currently the president and CEO of the Outrider Foundation. He has written more than a dozen books on topics ranging from the death penalty and movies to Ernest Hemingway and Elvis Presley.

== Early life and education ==
During his academic career at the University of Oregon, Elder ran the campus publication The Oregon Voice. He annotated and archived Ken Kesey's personal papers at the university's Knight Library.

== Professional career ==
Elder has published in The New York Times, Premiere, The Los Angeles Times, The Boston Globe, Salon.com, The Chicago Tribune and The Oregonian, among other publications. In the late 1990s, Elder worked for several publications and changed his byline to "Robert K. Elder" after working with another Rob Elder at the San Jose Mercury News.

He has taught journalism at Northwestern University's Medill School of Journalism, as well as feature writing and entertainment reporting at Columbia College Chicago. A former member of the Chicago Film Critics Association, he has also taught film classes at Facets Film School.

Elder has worked for DNAinfo Chicago as its managing editor, Stop Smiling magazine as a contributing editor, Crain Communications as the director of Digital Production Development and Strategy, 1871 Chicago as a business mentor, Blockchain News as a publisher and president, the Garage Fellows program at Northwestern University's Startup Incubator, the Garage, on the board of advisors, and the Bulletin of the Atomic Scientists as the Chief Digital Officer. As of May 2022, Elder is the president and CEO of the Outrider Foundation.

In June 2006, Elder debunked the long-believed Chicago legend that Del Close had donated his skull for use as a stage prop to the Goodman Theatre. While Close had willed his skull to the theater to serve as Yorick in productions of Hamlet, the delivery of the skull never happened, due to medical and legal issues, and it was cremated along with the rest of Close's body.

In June 2009, he founded the Web 2.0 company Odd Hours Media LLC, which launched the user-generated sites ItWasOverWhen.com and ItWasLoveWhen.com. Both sites attracted more than one million hits within a few months. Later that same year, Sourcebooks signed the sites to a two-book deal. The book It Was Over When: Tales of Romantic Dead Ends was available two years later.

In 2013, he was named the Lake County Editor for the Chicago Sun-Times. He went on to become editor-in-chief of Sun-Times Media Local, overseeing 36 of the company's suburban publications. The next year, he was named vice president of Digital Content, founding a guest editor program featuring people such as Billy Corgan of Smashing Pumpkins, Presumed Innocent author Scott Turow, and astronaut Jim Lovell. Elder also started a podcast network at the Sun-Times, hosting "The Big Questions," one of four initial shows.

In July 2018, Elder was featured on Billings Gazette. It recollects the moment that, "spurred a lifelong love of concert photography," and provoked Elder's journalism career.

== Books ==
Elder has written, researched, edited and/or contributed to over 20 books including:

- A Friendly Game of Poker: 52 Takes on the Neighborhood Game (2003), essays by a diverse group of writers that captures the joys, regrets, friendships, philosophies, and adventures experienced through neighborhood poker. This collection of 52 original pieces features a section of practical and impractical tips for home poker games and a cornucopia of fascinating facts about poker paintings, poker movies, poker books, and other poker-themed masterpieces of popular culture.
- 100 Bullets Vol. 5: The Counterfifth Detective (2003), where Elder was asked by Brian Azzarello to write the introduction for the fifth volume of his hardboiled epic. In this installment, a man named Milo receives an untraceable gun and matching bullets from a man named Agent Graves, who tells him the car accident that shattered his face was deliberate.
- John Woo: Interviews (2005), which Elder edited. The book is the first authoritative English-language chronicle of the life, legacy, and career of film director John Woo who reinvented the modern action movie and helped open the door for Asian filmmakers to the Western world.
- The Neil Gaiman Reader (2006), Darrell Schweitzer's critical look at author Neil Gaiman's legacy includes two lengthy interviews, including a never-before-published conversation Neil and Elder had in 1995, as he was finishing The Sandman and embarking on the novel that would become the Hugo Award-winning American Gods.
- The Last Words of the Executed (2010), after several years of research, captures the history of capital punishment in America, told from the gallows, the chair, and the gurney. Though not a political book, it asks: If these are the most reviled, outcast members of society—why does it remain a cultural value to record what they say? The book includes a foreword by Studs Terkel. In his foreword, Terkel wrote, "What I will remember most about this book is its poetry in the speech of people at the most traumatic moment of their lives." Rob Warden, executive director of the Center on Wrongful Convictions, said, "This is a powerful, haunting book."
- It Was Love When...: Tales from the Beginning of Love (2011), is a freeze frame of that moment when you realize that you're truly, completely in love. Stories collected from Elder's website of the same name.
- It Was Over When...: Tales of Romantic Dead Ends (2011), is dedicated to cataloging the exact moment when you realize a relationship isn't going to work. This could be years into a romance, on the first date or even before the first date. These stories can be funny, poignant, abysmally sad and universal. The aim: To provide a bit of comfort, humor and, hopefully, healing identification. Based on Elder's website of the same name.
- The Film That Changed My Life (2011), which captures the film-going experience that made future directors want to make movies. It explores 30 directors' love of a film they saw at a particularly formative moment, how it influenced their own works, and how it made them think differently. The book includes interviews with Rian Johnson on Annie Hall, Danny Boyle on Apocalypse Now and Kevin Smith on Slacker. Chicago Tribune film critic and former At the Movies co-host Michael Phillips has called the book, "A great and provocative read...it's addictive." Film critic Leonard Maltin said, "You'll have a hard time putting this book down."
- The Best Film You've Never Seen (2013), an attempt to rewrite film history. In this book, 35 directors champion their favorite overlooked or critically-savaged gems. The book received praise by critics such as Adam Kempenaar, Jonathan Rosenbaum, and Roger Ebert who called The Best Film You've Never Seen, "well judged and written! Some of the best films ever made, as Elder proves, are lamentably all but unknown."
- Des Plaines River Anthology (2013), where Elder was asked by Augie Aleksy, owner of Centuries & Sleuths Bookstore in Forest Park, to contribute to this collection about those buried in nearby communities. His chapters include Hollywood mogul Michael Todd (third husband of Elizabeth Taylor) and Smiley, a clown who died in 1918's Hagenbeck-Wallace circus train wreck — along with 85 of his fellow performers. This project was inspired by Edgar Lee Masters' Spoon River Anthology. The book won the Illinois State Historical Society's Superior Achievement Award in 2014.
- Conversations with Ken Kesey (2014), interviews trace his arc through success, fame, prison, farming, and tragedy―the death of his son in a car accident profoundly altered his life. These conversations make clear Kesey's central place in American culture and offer his enduring lesson that the freedom exists to create lives as wildly as can be imagined.
- Hidden Hemingway: Inside the Ernest Hemingway Archives of Oak Park (2016), a hardcover coffee table book that told the author's life story through rare images, objects, and letters. Included in the book: A little-seen poem that revealed Hemingway's first love and a note that suggested an affair with his sister-in-law. The book received praise from authors such as Garrison Keillor, Jonathan Eig and Scott Turow, who called Hidden Hemingway, "an invaluable book for anyone interested in Hemingway or the development of a major creative mind.”
- The Mixtape of My Life: A Do-It-Yourself Music Memoir (2018), a guided journal that offers prompts and questions to unlock memories through the soundtrack of your life. The book received praise from authors such as Mark Caro and Jason Bitner, who called The Mixtape of My Life, "an astonishing tool for unlocking your long-forgotten histories."
- Read Your Partner Like a Book: Everything You Should Know...But Never Thought to Ask: A Book of Questions for Couples (2019), a journal of questions that aims to help promote open communication and bonding—all while getting to know your partner better. It's a playful, light-hearted approach to some serious business.
- Unfinished and Unbroken: The Life of Artist Gilbert Wilson (2019), the lost biography of Gilbert Wilson edited by Elder, written by Pulitzer Prize-nominated biographer Edward K. Spann. Originally slated for publication in the 2000s, the project slipped into limbo when Spann died while editing the book. Once the Great Lost Book of Indiana, Spann's Unfinished and Unbroken: The Life of Artist Gilbert Wilson is an authoritative and expansive look at Wilson's life and art. Includes a foreword by Elder and an introduction by Edward K. Spann.
- Moby-Dick: Illustrated by Gilbert Wilson (2019), edited by Elder, celebrates Herman Melville's 200th birthday with a full-color edition of Moby-Dick, illustrated by the rediscovered art of Gilbert Wilson. Moby-Dick became Wilson's lifetime obsession, producing more than 200 paintings and drawings based on the novel. This large book showcases never-before-published artwork, notes, and meditations on the novel—drawing from unprecedented access to Wilson's estate.
- Hemingway in Comics (2020), a research into author Ernest Hemingway's appearance in comic books alongside figures like Superman, Mickey Mouse, Captain Marvel, and Cerebus. He has even battled fascists alongside Wolverine in Spain and teamed up with Shade to battle adversaries in the Area of Madness.
- Christmas with Elvis: The Official Guide to the Holidays from the King of Rock 'n' Roll (2021), a book designed like a Christmas party Elvis himself would have liked. It's a behind-the-scenes look at the iconic music and songs Elvis sang and recorded for his bestselling holiday albums, alongside favorite stories, trivia, and Yuletide cocktails and munchies—all wrapped up with a merry Christmas twist fit for the King of Rock 'n' Roll. Fully illustrated with color photographs and illustrations throughout.
- Marvel Comics Library. Spider-Man. Vol. 1. 1962–1964 (2022), which Elder worked with Steve Korte and TASCHEN on this inaugural volume of Spider-Man. Elder's contributions include some photos taken at the Library of Congress, where he examined Steve Ditko's original art for Amazing Fantasy #15, the first appearance of Spider-Man.
- Now, Then and in the Future: The Bulletin Turns 75 (2022), which Elder served as project manager on. The book was edited by John Mecklin and designed by Thomas Gaulkin. This 365-page book gathers some of the best writing published by the Bulletin of the Atomic Scientists since its founding in 1945 by Manhattan Project scientists.
- The Doomsday Clock at 75. (2022), which Elder co-edited alongside the Bulletin of the Atomic Scientists. The Doomsday Clock is many things all at once: It's a metaphor, it's a logo, it's a brand, and it's one of the most recognizable symbols of the past 100 years. Throughout the Doomsday Clock's 75 years, the Bulletin has worked to preserve its integrity and its scientific mission to educate and inform the public.

== Bibliography ==
- A Friendly Game of Poker, Chicago Review Press, 2003 (contributor)
- John Woo, Interviews, University Press of Mississippi, 2005 (editor)
- The Neil Gaiman Reader, Wildside Press, 2007 (contributor)
- Last Words of the Executed, University of Chicago Press, 2010 (editor)
- The Film That Changed My Life, Chicago Review Press, 2011 (editor)
- It Was Over When..., Sourcebooks Casablanca, 2011 (editor)
- The Best Film You've Never Seen, Chicago Review Press, 2013 (author)
- Hidden Hemingway: Inside the Ernest Hemingway Archives of Oak Park, Kent State University Press, 2016
- The Mixtape of My Life: A Do-It-Yourself Music Memoir, Running Press, 2018 (author)
