= Chiara Caselli =

Italian actress (born 1967)

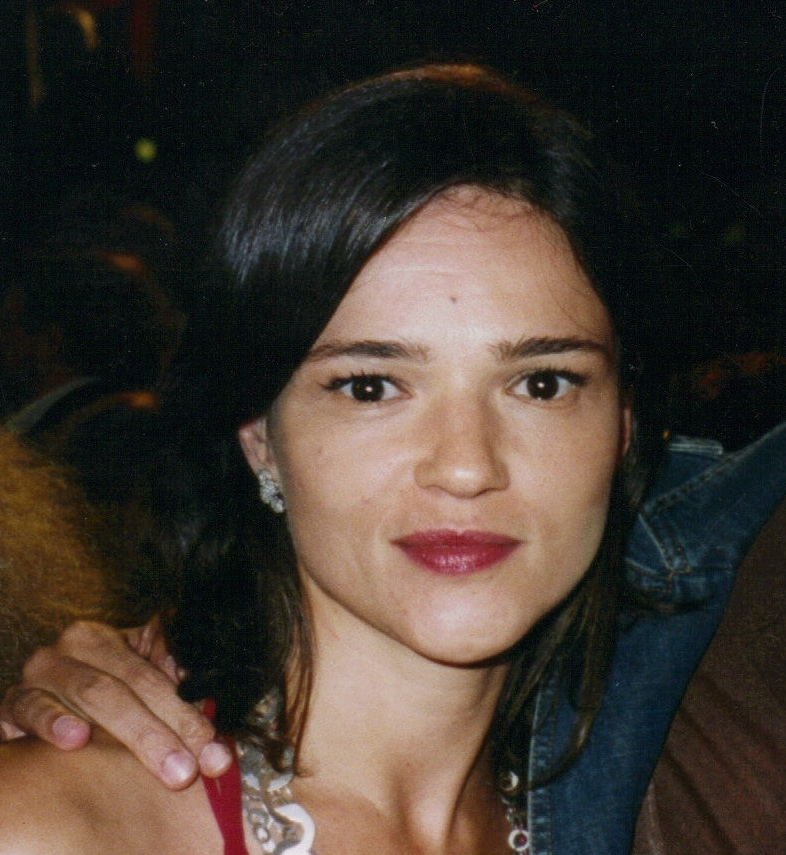
- Caselli in 2002 at the Taormina Film Fest
- Born: 22 December 1967 (age 58); Bologna, Italy
- Occupation: Actress

Chiara Caselli (born 22 December 1967) is an Italian actress. In 1994, Caselli won the Nastro d'Argento for Best Actress award for her role in Where are You? I'm Here as well as the David di Donatello for Best Actress award. Caselli has appeared in American films including My Own Private Idaho opposite River Phoenix and Keanu Reeves.

In 2002 she also appeared opposite John Malkovich in Ripley's Game.

== Filmography ==
=== Films ===
| Year | Title | Role | Notes |
|---|---|---|---|
| 1990 | The Secret | Lilli | |
| 1990 | Traces of an Amorous Life | Carla | |
| 1991 | My Own Private Idaho | Carmela | |
| 1991 | Especially on Sunday | Bride | Segment: "La neve sul fuoco" |
| 1991 | Segno di fuoco | Lidia | |
| 1992 | Nero | Francesca | |
| 1992 | Zuppa di pesce | Isabella Ragonelli | |
| 1992 | Sabato italiano | Angela | |
| 1993 | The Little Apocalypse | Luigi's daughter | |
| 1993 | Fiorile | Chiara | |
| 1993 | Where Are You? I'm Here | Elena Setti | |
| 1994 | OcchioPinocchio | Lucy Light | |
| 1995 | Beyond the Clouds | Mistress | |
| 1995 | Love Story with Cramps | Marcella / Amanda | |
| 1996 | Oui | Alice | |
| 1997 | Five Stormy Days | Loredana | |
| 1999 | The Vivero Letter | Caterina Carrara | |
| 1999 | Olympic Garage | Ana | |
| 2000 | Waiting for the Messiah | Laura | |
| 2000 | Il prezzo | Alba | |
| 2001 | Sleepless | Gloria | |
| 2002 | Ripley's Game | Luisa Harari | |
| 2006 | Cover Boy | Laura | |
| 2008 | The Past Is a Foreign Land | Maria | |
| 2008 | Birdwatchers | Beatrice | |
| 2009 | Mr. Nobody | A beggar | Cameo appearance |
| 2009 | Father of My Children | Sylvia Canvel | |
| 2011 | Beau rivage | Sandra Bandini | |
| 2012 | Un milione di giorni | Costanza d'Altavilla | |
| 2013 | Like the Wind | Rita Rausi | |
| 2014 | Presto farà giorno | Laura | |
| 2014 | Pasolini | Laura Betti | Uncredited |
| 2017 | Gli asteroidi | Teresa | |
| 2019 | Il signor Diavolo | Clara | |
| 2021 | We Still Talk | Elisabetta Sgarbi | |
| 2024 | The American Backyard | Doris | |
| 2026 | Nina Roza | Giulia Mancini | |

=== Television ===
| Year | Title | Role | Notes |
|---|---|---|---|
| 1991–1992 | Il commissario Corso | Andrea | Main role |
| 1993 | La grande collection | Comtesse Livia | Episode: "Senso" |
| 2001 | Senza confini | Fiamma Neumann | Main role |
| 2003 | The Good Pope: Pope John XXIII | Carla | Television film |
| 2004 | Colette, une femme libre | Georgie Duvall | Main role |
| 2018 | Thou Shalt Not Kill | Debora Perrone | Episode: "Episodioo 14" |
| 2020 | Baby | Angela | 4 episodes |
| 2024 | Antonia | Deanna | Main role |
