= Father and Son (1994 film) =

1994 Italian drama film

- Directed by: Pasquale Pozzessere
- Written by: Pasquale Pozzessere; Roberto Tiraboschi
- Cinematography: Bruno Cascio
- Edited by: Carlo Valerio
- Release date: 1994
- Running time: 95 minutes
- Language: Italian

Father and Son (Italian: Padre e figlio) is a 1994 drama film written and directed by Pasquale Pozzessere. It won two David di Donatello Awards, for best cinematography and best editing.

== Cast ==
- Michele Placido: Corrado
- Stefano Dionisi: Gabriele
- Enrica Origo: Angela
- Carlotta Jazzetti: Anna
- Giusy Consoli: Valeria
- Claudia Gerini: Chiara
- Luciano Federico: Aldo
