= Stefano Dionisi =

Italian actor (born 1966)

Stefano Dionisi (born 1 October 1966, in Rome) is an Italian actor. He has performed in more than sixty films since 1986. He is best known for portraying the 18th-century Italian castrato opera singer Farinelli in the movie of the same name.

== Filmography ==
=== Film ===
Year	Title	Role(s)	Notes
1990	The Secret	Carlo	
1990	Traces of an Amorous Life	Petty thief	
1992	Going South	Eugenio	
1992	Lettera da Parigi	Marco	
1992	Sabato italiano	Ricky	
1993	Mille bolle blu	Antonio	
1993	The Rebel	Franchino	
1994	Farinelli	Carlo "Farinelli" Broschi	
1994	Padre e figlio	Gabriele	
1995	Sostiene Pereira	Monteiro Rossi	
1996	Bambola	Flavio	
1996	The Mysterious Enchanter	Giacomo Vigetti	
1997	The Truce	Daniele	
1998	Claudine's Return	Stefano Mauri	
1998	Shooting the Moon	Roberto	
1999	Children of the Century	Pietro Pagello	
1999	The Loss of Sexual Innocence	Luca	
1999	Ein Lied von Liebe und Tod	András	
2000	Lupo mannaro	Rago	
2000	Johnny the Partisan	Johnny	
2000	Il prezzo	Romano	
2001	Sleepless	Giacomo Gallo	
2002	Ginostra	Giovanni Gigli	
2004	Ovunque sei	Leonardo	
2005	Raul: Straight to Kill	Raul	
2005	La porta delle 7 lettere	David	
2006	Antonio Vivaldi, un prince à Venise	Antonio Vivaldi	
2006	Last Minute Marocco	Giorgio	
2007	Family Game	Vittorio Magrini	
2008	Blood of the Losers	Kurt	
2009	La fisica dell'acqua	Daniele	
2010	Ti presento un amico	Giorgio Roversi	
2010	Cocapop	Lorenzo	
2011	L'amore fa male	Aldo	
2014	The Mother	Father Paolo	
2018	Ride	Nicola	
2021	Three Floors	Roberto	
2025	Fuori	Valerio	

=== Television ===
Year	Title	Role(s)	Notes
1990	Pronto soccorso	Fabio Coretti	Main role (season 1)
1990	La piovra	Stefano Pardi	Main role (season 5)
1995	Joseph	Pharaoh	Television movie
1996	Correre contro	Pablo	Television movie
1999	La vita che verrà	Pietro	Main role
2002	Sans famille	Georg von Strauberg	Television movie
2004	Virginia, la monaca di Monza	Gian Paolo Osio	Television movie
2004	The Betrothed	Don Rodrigo	Television movie
2006	Inspector Montalbano	Rocco Pennisi	Episode: "Il gioco delle tre carte"
2007	Caccia segreta	Nicola Bramante	Television movie
2009	L'avvocato Guerrieri: Ad occhi chiusi	Gianluca Sciannatico	Television movie
2010	David Copperfield	Edward Murdstone	Television movie
2011–2015	Anti-Drug Squad	Ivano Consanti	Main role
2012	Inspector Nardone	Sergio Suderghi	Main role
2013	Pupetta: Il coraggio e la passione	Inspector Antonio Imparato	Television movie
2014	Furore	Rino Schivo	Main role (season 1)
2015	L'onore e il rispetto	Michael O'Keefe	Main role (season 4)
2016	Un medico in famiglia	Valerio Petrucci	Recurring role (season 10)
2017	Il bello delle donne… alcuni anni dopo	Dante Trifirò	Episode: "Episode 3"
2017	1993	Sergio Cusani	3 episodes
2017	Thou Shalt Not Kill	Roberto Piastra	Episode: "Eleven"
2018	Il confine	Davide Cattonar	Television movie
2018	L'isola di Pietro	Ignazio Silas	4 episodes
2018	Non dirlo al mio capo	Sergio Marzoni	Episode: "Fantasmi e miraggi"
2019	La Compagnia del Cigno	Antonio Mercanti	3 episodes
2020	La vita promessa	Bruno Morelli	Main role (season 2)
2020	Don Matteo	Renzo Cicogna	Episode: "Non desiderare la roba d'altri"
2023	Blanca	Raffaele Randi	Main role (season 2)
2024	My Brilliant Friend	Franco Mari	2 episodes
2024	Stucky	Pietro	Episode: "A cuore aperto"
