= Going South (1992 film) =

- Directed by: Pasquale Pozzessere
- Written by: Pasquale Pozzessere
- Produced by: Pasquale Pozzessere
- Starring: Antonella Ponziani; Stefano Dionisi
- Cinematography: Bruno Cascio
- Music by: Corrado Rizza; Domenico Scuteri
- Release date: 1992
- Running time: 88 min.
- Language: Italian

Going South (Italian: Verso Sud) is a 1992 Italian drama film produced, written and directed by Pasquale Pozzessere.

For this film Antonella Ponziani was awarded with a David di Donatello for Best Actress and a Silver Ribbon in the same category. The director Pasquale Pozzessere was instead nominated for a David di Donatello for Best New Director and won a Grolla d'oro in the same category. The film also won the Grand Prix at the Annecy Film Festival.

== Plot ==
Rome. Paola is a single mother who has just come out of prison; Eugenio is a homeless young man addicted to alcohol. Paola's son is called Chicco, and he is a little boy who lives in an institution for minors where his mother goes to visit him. Meanwhile, Eugenio steals from the offer boxes in the church to go to the disco. However, he is beaten and robbed in the bathroom of the room by the accomplices of a girl who had pretended to want to go away with him. One evening the boy goes to the Caritas canteen and there he meets Paola, who asks him if he knows a place to sleep. Eugenio takes her to the train station, in a wagon in storage where he usually spends the night. There the two make love. The next morning they say goodbye by making an appointment for the evening at the canteen. Eugenio seeks work from an acquaintance, who throws him in a bad way, so he decides to contact the priest of the church where he was going to steal. The man offers him to lend a hand to a gentleman who gets by, by picking up the cardboard: Eugenio accepts. In the evening he goes to Caritas, waits until closing time but Paola does not arrive. Then he goes disconsolately to the station, where he meets her. He decides to take her to a seized building he had noticed in the afternoon. He hopes that he has found a better place to live with the girl. Their bond seems to be strengthening, but Paola is frightened at the idea of having her son taken away from her, and one day, returning home, Eugenio discovers that she is gone. He goes out and meets a friend who invites him for a drink in a bar. Later, completely drunk, he goes to the station and collapses on a sidewalk. Upon awakening he realizes that his shoes have been stolen and returns to the apartment. Here he finds Paola who shows him little Chicco and tells him how, by chance, she managed to take him away from the institute.

Eugenio soon realizes that by staying in the apartment they would be discovered, so he steals a car to go, with what he now considers his family, to a friend who is a carousel in Puglia who can have them boarded illegally for Greece. Arriving at his destination, having to obtain the money necessary for the trip, his friend and two of his accomplices get involved in a robbery at a supermarket. The shot seems to have landed without being injured, despite a shooting. Eugenio, Paola and Chicco leave for Brindisi, where a man is waiting for them to hide them in a truck to be loaded on their way to Patras. Along the way - however - it turns out that Eugenio was injured in the robbery, but refuses to be taken to the hospital. Having reached their destination, the young man, exhausted, asks the girl to stop the car. He takes a few steps and collapses in agony at the foot of a tree. Here he hands the money to Paola and tells her who to contact when she arrives at the freight yard, so she dies. Paola and Chicco manage to embark.

== Cast ==
- Antonella Ponziani: Paola
- Stefano Dionisi: Eugenio
- Pierfrancesco Pergoli: Chicco
- Irene Grazioli: Teresa
- Tito Schipa Jr.: Prete

== See also ==
- List of Italian films of 1992
