= Marco Pontecorvo =

Italian cinematographer and film director

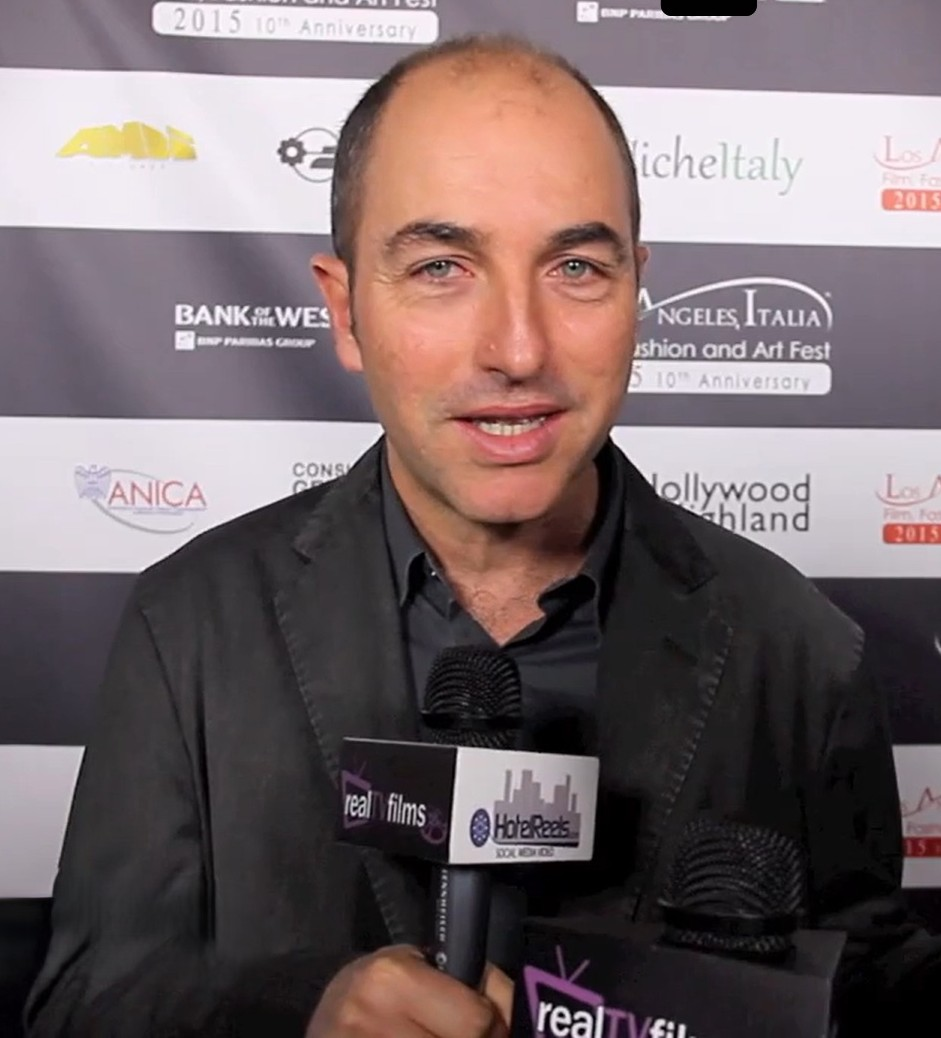
- Pontecorvo in 2015
- Born: 8 November 1966 (age 59); Rome, Italy
- Occupation: Cinematographer
- Parent: Gillo Pontecorvo (father)

Marco Pontecorvo (born November 8, 1966, Rome) is an Italian cinematographer and film director.

Marco Pontecorvo was initially interested in black and white photography, but eventually became a filmmaker like his father Gillo. He debuted as director of photography on In sailing in the wrong direction (1997). Some of his best known works are Rome, The Last Legion, Letters to Juliet and Game of Thrones.

He has also directed films. His first film Pa-ra-da received several award nominations, including the Silver Ribbon for the best debutant director and the David di Donatello for Best Debut Director, and won the Pasinetti Award at the 65th Venice International Film Festival and the Francis Laudadio Award for Best First Feature at the Bari International Film Festival.

== Filmography ==
| Year | Title | Genre | Notes |
|---|---|---|---|
| 1996 | Binari | short | |
| 1997 | The Many Women of Fassbinder | TV documentary | |
| 1997 | La tregua | | |
| 1997 | In sailing in the wrong direction | TV series | 2000 |
| 1998 | Bambina in metro B | short | |
| 1998 | Fuochino | short | |
| 1998 | Greener Fields | TV movie | |
| 1998 | The Guest | | |
| 1998 | Le ragazze di Piazza di Spagna | TV series | 2000 |
| 1999 | Banana Splatter | short | |
| 1999 | Katja's Adventure | | |
| 2000 | Voci | | |
| 2000 | On the Beach Beyond the Pier | | |
| 2002 | La prossima volta | short | |
| 2002 | Una seconda occasione | short | |
| 2003 | My House in Umbria | TV movie | |
| 2003 | Perduto amor | | |
| 2004 | Eros | | |
| 2005 | Rome | TV series | 2005 - 2007 |
| 2006 | Firewall | | |
| 2007 | The Last Legion | | |
| 2009 | My One and Only | | |
| 2009 | Evidence for a Sicilian Tragedy | | |
| 2010 | Letters to Juliet | | |
| 2010 | Passione | | |
| 2011 | Game of Thrones | TV series | |
| 2013 | Fading Gigolo | | |
| 2015 | Partly Cloudy with Sunny Spells | | |
| 2018 | Carlo & Malik | TV series | |
| 2020 | Fatima | | |
