= Murder of Yara Gambirasio =

2010 child murder in Italy

Yara Gambirasio
- Born: 21 May 1997; Bergamo, Italy
- Died: 26 November 2010 (aged 13); Chignolo d'Isola, Italy
- Cause of death: Blunt force trauma, frostbite
- Body discovered: 26 February 2011
- Education: Middle school
- Occupations: Student, gymnast
- Known for: Murder victim
- Parents: Fulvio Gambirasio (father); Maura Panarese (mother)

The investigation following the murder of Yara Gambirasio in 2010 was one of the most extensive in Italian criminal history. In the early evening of 26 November 2010, Gambirasio, a 13-year-old Italian schoolgirl, disappeared after being at the sports centre in her city, Brembate di Sopra, Lombardy, Italy. She had gone there to bring a stereo for a gymnastics competition scheduled for the following weekend. Her body was found on 26 February 2011 in a field near the industrial area of Chignolo d’Isola, 10 km from Brembate. The body, now decomposed, showed multiple deep cuts and a head wound, inflicted when the victim was still alive and not individually lethal. The cause of death was determined as a combination of a head blow, non-lethal cuts, and hypothermia. There was no sign of sexual assault.

Yara's funeral was held on 28 May 2011, led by Bishop Francesco Beschi of Bergamo. Initially, a young Moroccan man, Mohamed Fikri, was wrongfully arrested due to a mistranslation of his words.

The investigation found 11 different DNA traces on the body, of which only two have been identified and attributed to individuals. Forensic scientists analyzed 22,000 DNA profiles from a trace found on Yara's underwear and leggings, eventually leading to the arrest of Massimo Bossetti, a local construction worker, in June 2014. Bossetti pleaded not guilty to the abduction and killing, arguing his DNA was either contaminated or fabricated, but police maintained the sample was of excellent quality. Despite questions about the DNA evidence, Bossetti was sentenced to life imprisonment by the Corte d'Assise of Bergamo in July 2016, with the verdict upheld on appeal and confirmed by the Court of Cassation in October 2018. In November 2019, Bossetti's lawyers requested a review of the DNA evidence, which was denied in March 2021 due to insufficient DNA remaining.

In December 2022, an investigation was launched into the chief investigator Letizia Ruggeri, over accusations of misdirection and trial fraud. The case was dismissed in 2024, the judge finding that she had not intentionally destroyed evidence.

== Murder ==
At 6:44 PM on 26 November 2010, Yara Gambirasio left the Brembate di Sopra sports centre alone, but never reached her home 700 meters away. Her family soon called the Carabinieri, but despite a search involving hundreds of volunteers, her body was not found until 26 February 2011 in Chignolo d'Isola, 10 kilometres from Brembate. The body was found by chance, when a man was flying a model airplane and the model fell near Yara's body. The man called the police, who confirmed it was indeed Yara's corpse in a state of decomposition. The body showed multiple cuts, possibly made by a pointed object such as a nail or a knife, and a large wound on the head. All those wounds were not found to be lethal by themselves, and she actually died because she was left alone, bleeding during a cold winter. There was no clear sign of sexual assault, but DNA traces were found over the upper part of her leggings and her intimate clothing as well.

== Investigation ==
In August 2011 a final autopsy report had not yet been released and not even the exact cause of death had been ascertained, but leaked details from the investigation suggested that the death was caused by the combination of a head blow (as from falling on a hard surface or being hit with a stone), at least six cut wounds (none deadly) and hypothermia. It did not appear that Gambirasio had been raped. Yara's funeral took place on 28 May 2011 and was presided over by the bishop of Bergamo Francesco Beschi. The first suspect was a young Moroccan man, Mohamed Fikri. He was arrested on the basis of an overheard but mistranslated comment. The comment he made was "Allah, make her answer (the phone)" but it was translated as "Allah forgive me, I didn't kill her" However, after other translators listened to what he said, Fikri was declared innocent.

After a trace of genetic material was taken from the victim's underwear and leggings, forensic scientists analyzed and compared about 22,000 DNA profiles and the search began for a suspect with matching DNA, referred to as "Ignoto 1" (Unknown 1, the identifying nickname given by investigators to the murderer of Gambirasio). The first person who had a trace of DNA that had much in common with Ignoto 1 was a young man called Damiano Guerinoni, who was related in some way to Ignoto 1. The deceased father of "Ignoto 1", Giuseppe Guerinoni, who had died in 1999, was identified relatively quickly thanks to the DNA of Damiano Guerinoni (nephew of Giuseppe Guerinoni). However, the search for the actual suspect was much longer and complicated because he turned out to be an illegitimate son of Giuseppe Guerinoni - a circumstance apparently totally unknown to anyone else previously. The suspect only became the target of investigations after his mother, Ester Arzuffi, was tested for DNA, and the tests showed it was likely that the suspect was one of her sons. The investigators wanted to observe the suspect, Massimo Giuseppe Bossetti, an Italian bricklayer living and working in the area, for several months before confronting him. His DNA match with that of "Ignoto 1" was confirmed during an apparently routine breathalyzer test, which was performed specifically with the intention of obtaining his DNA.

On 16 June 2014, Bossetti was arrested and accused of being the murderer. He consistently proclaimed his innocence, stating he suffered from nosebleeds and that someone had stolen his work tools, including a knife, an awl and a trowel, possibly blood-soiled, and that the DNA proof was fabricated, due to either excessive exposure to the weather or cross-contamination. He said "The tools may be mine, but the hand that killed her wasn't mine" Yet police maintained that the sample was "of excellent quality" and Bossetti was denied any chance of a plea bargain or confession, despite his charge of life imprisonment, because apparently, there was not enough DNA trace to make another test. His wife confirmed his alibi, but she was not believed, also based on some phone recordings.

In January 2015, a scientific adviser to the court stated that the MtDNA of "Ignoto 1" might not match that of Bossetti, and that there might be the possibility of an error. According to rumours, as early as July 2013, the DNA showed no correspondence with the genetic maternal line of Massimo Bossetti (a fact explained with a comparison error among thousands of samples), while that correspondence was found after a further analysis on the illegitimate child - after the suggestion of an acquaintance of Ester Arzuffi (the mother of the suspect). If Bossetti appears to be Guerinoni's son, there are still doubts even on the nuclear DNA and its correspondence with the profile of the suspect. The attorney refused, however, to question the evidence, as requested by the lawyers of Bossetti, who have repeated several times the request for release of their client, and asked to declare him not guilty in a future trial. Bossetti's lawyer said that "there is an obvious anomaly, the mitochondrial DNA does not match the nuclear DNA. This should at least make us raise a question: whether the whole process which led to the identification of DNA has been done with the most absolute correctness, or not."

An instructor at the gym, Silvia Brena, has been the focus of attention of Bossetti's defence. Her blood was found on the sleeves of Yara's jacket, identified by DNA. On the night of Yara's disappearance, Silvia Brena's father said that she cried all night, although she gave no reason for this. Under questioning, she said that she remembered nothing and could not explain why she and her brother had sent text messages to each other at the time of Yara's disappearance, which they had almost immediately deleted without deleting other messages sent before and after.

The search for the culprit of Gambirasio's murder was one of the most extensive in Italian criminal history.

== Aftermath ==
On 1 July 2016, the Corte d'Assise of Bergamo sentenced Bossetti to life imprisonment. In July 2017, the Corte d'Assise d'Appello di Brescia upheld the verdict. On 12 October 2018, the Court of Cassation confirmed Bossetti's life sentence.

In November 2019, Bossetti's defence lawyers asked for a review of the DNA evidence. In March 2021, their request was not accepted because there was no more DNA to be analysed. This led in December 2022 to an investigation of Letizia Ruggeri, chief investigator on the case, accused of misdirection and trial fraud. In September 2024, the case against Ruggeri was dismissed, the judge finding that she had not intentionally destroyed evidence.

In 2024, Netflix released a documentary series, named The Yara Gambirasio Case: Beyond Reasonable Doubt, covering the abduction, trial and issues surrounding the DNA.

== See also ==
- List of solved missing person cases (2010s)

== Further information ==
- Bella, Salvo (2014). Yara, orrori e depistaggi. Gruppo Edicom. ISBN 9788882363482.
- Unknown Male Number 1, documentary about the case
- Yara (2021), a Netflix film
