= Antonella Ponziani =

Italian actress

- Born: 29 February 1964 (age 62); Rome, Italy
- Occupation: Actress

Antonella Ponziani (born 29 February 1964) is an Italian actress.

Born in Rome, she attended the academy Mimo Teatro Movimento, under the guidance of Lidia Biondi. She debuted in 1986, in Salvatore Samperi's La Bonne, and appeared in Federico Fellini's Intervista (1987) and as Donald Pleasence's daughter in Ruggero Deodato's 1988 giallo film Phantom of Death.

In 1992, Ponziani won a Nastro d'Argento for Best Actress and a David di Donatello in the same category for the film Verso Sud. She appeared in the 1994 comedy Dear Goddamned Friends, and won a Ciak d'oro for Best Supporting Actress in 1996 for her performance in Ferie d'Agosto by Paolo Virzì.

In 1999 she debuted as director and screenwriter with the comedy film L'ultimo Mundial, in which she also appeared as an actress.
