= Pasquale Pozzessere =

Italian film director and screenwriter (born 1957)

- Born: 1957 (age 67–68); Lizzano
- Occupation(s): film director, screenwriter

Pasquale Pozzessere (born in 1957) is an Italian film director and screenwriter.

== Life and career ==
Born in Lizzano, Taranto in the mid-1980s Pozzessere abandoned his medicine university studies to enter the cinema industry working as a script supervisor for Pupi Avati and as assistant director of Francesco Maselli. After directing a number of short films, he made his feature film debut in 1992, with Verso Sud, for which he was nominated to a David di Donatello for Best New Director and won the Grolla d'oro in the same category. The film also won the Grand Prix at the Annecy Film Festival.

== Filmography ==
- Verso Sud (1992)
- Father and Son (1994)
- An Eyewitness Account (1997)
- La vita che verrà (TV, 1999)
- La porta delle sette stelle (2005)
- La provinciale (TV, 2006)
- Cocapop (2010)
- Mine (2016)
