= List of Italian films of 1993 =

A list of films produced in Italy in 1993 (see 1993 in film):

Title	Director	Cast	Genre	Notes
1993
Amami	Bruno Colella	Moana Pozzi, Novello Novelli	comedy	
Un'anima divisa in due	Silvio Soldini	Fabrizio Bentivoglio, Philippine Leroy-Beaulieu	drama	Volpi Cup at the 50th Venice Film Festival
Anni 90: Parte II	Enrico Oldoini	Christian De Sica, Massimo Boldi, Nino Frassica	comedy	
The Bilingual Lover	Vicente Aranda	Imanol Arias, Ornella Muti	erotic comedy-drama	Spanish-Italian co-production
Benito	Gianluigi Calderone	Antonio Banderas, Claudia Koll, Susanne Lothar	biographical	
Briganti	Marco Modugno	Claudio Amendola, Monica Bellucci, Ricky Memphis	comedy-drama	
Caino e Caino	Alessandro Benvenuti	Alessandro Benvenuti, Enrico Montesano	comedy	
Caro diario	Nanni Moretti	Nanni Moretti, Carlo Mazzacurati, Jennifer Beals	Comedy	2 David di Donatello including Best Film. Cannes Award
Condannato a nozze	Giuseppe Piccioni	Sergio Rubini, Margherita Buy, Valeria Bruni Tedeschi, Asia Argento	comedy	
Diary of a Maniac	Marco Ferreri	Jerry Calà, Sabrina Ferilli	drama	Entered into the 43rd Berlin International Film Festival
The End Is Known	Cristina Comencini	Fabrizio Bentivoglio, Carlo Cecchi, Valérie Kaprisky	Drama	
The Escort (La scorta)	Ricky Tognazzi	Claudio Amendola, Enrico Lo Verso, Carlo Cecchi, Ricky Memphis	crime-drama	Entered into the 1993 Cannes Film Festival
Fantozzi in paradiso	Neri Parenti	Paolo Villaggio, Milena Vukotic	comedy	
Fiorile	Paolo and Vittorio Taviani	Claudio Bigagli, Galatea Ranzi, Renato Carpentieri	Drama	Entered into the 1993 Cannes Film Festival
For Love, Only for Love	Giovanni Veronesi	Penélope Cruz, Diego Abatantuono, Alessandro Haber	historical drama	
Giovanni Falcone	Giuseppe Ferrara	Michele Placido, Anna Bonaiuto, Giancarlo Giannini	biographical drama	
The Great Pumpkin (Il grande cocomero)	Francesca Archibugi	Sergio Castellitto, Anna Galiena, Alessia Fugardi	Drama	3 David di Donatello, 2 Nastro d'Argento
I Don't Want to Talk About It	Marcello Mastroianni	María Luisa Bemberg, Luisina Brando	drama	
Jonah Who Lived in the Whale	Roberto Faenza	Jean-Hugues Anglade, Juliet Aubrey	drama	Entered into the 18th Moscow International Film Festival
Jonathan of the Bears	Roberto Faenza	Franco Nero, John Saxon, Floyd Red Crow Westerman, David Hess	western	
Let's Not Keep in Touch	Carlo Verdone	Carlo Verdone, Asia Argento, Aldo Maccione	drama	Entered into the 43rd Berlin International Film Festival
Libera	Pappi Corsicato	Iaia Forte	comedy	
Little Buddha	Bernardo Bertolucci	Chris Isaak, Bridget Fonda, Keanu Reeves	drama	Italian-French-British co-production
The Long Silence	Margarethe von Trotta	Carla Gravina, Jacques Perrin, Paolo Graziosi	Drama	Italian-French-German co-production
Magnificat	Pupi Avati	Luigi Diberti, Arnaldo Ninchi	drama	Entered into the 1993 Cannes Film Festival
Mario, Maria and Mario	Ettore Scola	Giulio Scarpati, Valeria Cavalli, Enrico Lo Verso	Drama	
Mille bolle blu	Leone Pompucci	Claudio Bigagli, Antonio Catania	comedy	
Nel continente nero	Marco Risi	Diego Abatantuono, Corso Salani, Anna Falchi	comedy	
Next Time the Fire	Fabio Carpi	Jean Rochefort, Marie-Christine Barrault	drama	
Pacco, doppio pacco e contropaccotto	Nanni Loy	Leo Gullotta, Marina Confalone, Enzo Cannavale	comedy	Last film of Nanni Loy
Piccolo grande amore	Carlo Vanzina	Raoul Bova, Barbara Snellenburg, David Warner, Susannah York	romantic comedy	
Quattro bravi ragazzi	Claudio Camarca	Michele Placido	Crime-drama	
The Rebel	Aurelio Grimaldi	Penélope Cruz, Marco Leonardi, Stefano Dionisi	Drama	
The Secret of the Old Woods	Ermanno Olmi	Paolo Villaggio, Giulio Brogi	fantasy-drama	
Sparrow	Franco Zeffirelli	Angela Bettis, Johnathon Schaech, Vanessa Redgrave	Drama	
Stefano Quantestorie	Maurizio Nichetti	Maurizio Nichetti, Elena Sofia Ricci	comedy	
The Storm Is Coming	Daniele Luchetti	Diego Abatantuono, Margherita Buy, Silvio Orlando	comedy	
Sud	Gabriele Salvatores	Silvio Orlando, Francesca Neri, Gigio Alberti, Claudio Bisio	comedy-drama	
Teste rasate	Claudio Fragasso	Gianmarco Tognazzi, Flavio Bucci	action-drama	
Trauma	Dario Argento	Asia Argento, Piper Laurie	giallo	
Troll 3	Fabrizio Laurenti	Mary Sellers	horror	
Where Are You? I'm Here	Liliana Cavani	Chiara Caselli, Anna Bonaiuto	drama	Volpi Cup at the 50th Venice Film Festival
Women Don't Want To	Pino Quartullo	Pino Quartullo, Lucrezia Lante della Rovere, Antonella Ponziani	Comedy	
