= Luis Molteni =

Italian actor (1950–2024)

- Born: Gianluigi Molteni; 5 November 1950; Seregno, Italy
- Died: 28 February 2024 (aged 73); Rome, Italy

Gianluigi "Luis" Molteni (5 November 1950 – 28 February 2024) was an Italian actor whose career spanned over 40 years.

== Life and career ==
Born in Seregno, Molteni started his career in 1979, as a member of the theatrical company Quelli di Grok. He made his film debut in 1980 in I Made a Splash, directed by Maurizio Nichetti, with whom he frequently collaborated until mid-1990s.

A character actor mainly active in the comedy and thriller genres, Molteni often worked with Giovanni Veronesi, and his credits include works by Giuseppe Tornatore, Dario Argento, Gabriele Muccino, Carlo Verdone, Sergio Castellitto, Sergio Rubini. In 1993, he was nominated for the Ciak d'Oro for best supporting actor for his performance in Nero. Also a visual artist, Molteni died on 28 February 2024, at the age of 73.

== Selected filmography ==
- Tomorrow We Dance (1983)
- The Icicle Thief (1989)
- Nero (1992)
- The Blonde (1993)
- Let's Not Keep in Touch (1994)
- Viaggi di nozze (1995)
- Snowball (1995)
- The Phantom of the Opera (1998)
- The Legend of 1900 (1998)
- Dangerous Beauty (1998)
- 20 - Venti (1999)
- But Forever in My Mind (1999)
- Guardami (1999)
- Libero Burro (1999)
- Almost Blue (2000)
- Triumph of Love (2001)
- Pinocchio (2002)
- The Vanity Serum (2004)
- What Will Happen to Us (2004)
- Il ritorno del Monnezza (2005)
- I Love You in Every Language in the World (2005)
- Manual of Love (2005)
- Really SSSupercool: Chapter Two (2006)
- Olé (2006)
- Ten Winters (2009)
- Giallo (2009)
- Lightning Strike (2012)
- The Fifth Wheel (2013)
- What's Your Sign? (2014)
- Amici come prima (2018)
- The King's Musketeers (2018)
