= I Made a Splash =

1980 comedy film

- Directed by: Maurizio Nichetti
- Written by: Maurizio Nichetti; Guido Manuli
- Produced by: Franco Cristaldi; Nicola Carraro
- Starring: Maurizio Nichetti
- Cinematography: Mario Battistoni
- Edited by: Giancarlo Rossi
- Music by: Detto Mariano
- Distributed by: Cineriz
- Release date: 1980
- Country: Italy
- Language: Italian

I Made a Splash (Italian: Ho fatto splash) is a 1980 comedy film co-written and directed by Maurizio Nichetti.

== Plot ==
In the 1950s, a child falls into a long sleep in front of the TV during a performance by Nilla Pizzi. He awakens in the early 1980s and must face an entirely changed world dominated by consumism and advertising.

== Cast ==
- Maurizio Nichetti as Maurizio
- Luisa Morandini as Luisa
- Angela Finocchiaro as Angela
- Carlina Torta as Carlina
- Daniel Bongiovanni as Mimi's son
- Flavio Bonacci as photographer
- Walter Valdi as robber
- Ugo Bologna as customer
- Massimo Sacelotti as Massimo
- Guido Spadea as impresario
- Lyall Crawford as English director
- Renato Dondi as waiter
- Giulia Lazzarini as Ariel
- Corrado Lojacono as fireman
- Enzo Radicchio as publicist
- Manuela Blanchard as advertising girl
- Mirella Falco as woman in church
- Luis Molteni as man at reception

== Production ==
Principal photography started in May 1980. The film was shot at Icet-De Paolis studios in Cinecittà.

== Reception ==
Piero Perona in La Stampa noted how the film, "rich in wit and style, consisted mainly of a revisiting of the silent cinema that directly inspired it", particularly Harry Langdon, Max Linder, Larry Semon and Charlie Chaplin. According to Giovanni Grazzini from Corriere della Sera, in this film Nichetti displayed a "a greater maturity in narrative structure but a more fragile inspiration" than in his debut film Ratataplan. Cinema Nuovo's Ivo Franchi described the film as "structurally weak", with "flimsy characters" and comic situations he compared to TV variety show sketches.
