= List of Italian films of 1996 =

A list of films produced in Italy in 1996 (see 1996 in film):

Title	Director	Cast	Genre	Notes
1996
Albergo Roma	Ugo Chiti	Alessandro Benvenuti, Debora Caprioglio, Claudio Bisio, Tchéky Karyo	comedy	
Anni Ribelli	Rosalia Polizzi	Massimo Dapporto, Leticia Brédice	romantic drama	
A spasso nel tempo	Carlo Vanzina	Christian De Sica, Massimo Boldi, Dean Jones	comedy	
Il barbiere di Rio	Giovanni Veronesi	Diego Abatantuono, Rocco Papaleo, Margaret Mazzantini	comedy	
Bits and Pieces (Il cielo è sempre più blu)	Antonello Grimaldi	Claudio Bisio, Margherita Buy, Asia Argento, Francesca Neri, Monica Bellucci	comedy-drama	
The Blue Collar Worker and the Hairdresser in a Whirl of Sex and Politics	Lina Wertmüller	Tullio Solenghi, Gene Gnocchi, Veronica Pivetti, Piera Degli Esposti	comedy	
The Border	Franco Giraldi	Raoul Bova, Marco Leonardi, Claudia Pandolfi, Giancarlo Giannini	war-drama	
Bruno aspetta in macchina	Duccio Camerini	Nancy Brilli, Leo Gullotta, Valerio Mastandrea	comedy	
Celluloide	Carlo Lizzani	Giancarlo Giannini, Massimo Ghini, Anna Falchi, Lina Sastri, Christopher Walken	Film making	About the shooting of Rome, Open City. 3 David di Donatello
Il ciclone	Leonardo Pieraccioni	Leonardo Pieraccioni, Lorena Forteza	comedy	
Cresceranno i carciofi a Mimongo	Fulvio Ottaviano	Daniele Liotti, Valerio Mastandrea	comedy	
The Elective Affinities	Paolo and Vittorio Taviani	Isabelle Huppert, Fabrizio Bentivoglio, Jean-Hugues Anglade	comedy	Screened at the 1996 Cannes Film Festival
Escoriandoli	Antonio Rezza	Valentina Cervi, Isabella Ferrari, Claudia Gerini, Valeria Golino	comedy	Screened at the 53rd Venice International Film Festival
Fatal Frames	Al Festa	Stefania Stella, Rick Gianas, David Warbeck		
Giovani e belli	Dino Risi	Anna Falchi, Ciccio Ingrassia	comedy	Last film of Dino Risi
How the Toys Saved Christmas	Enzo D'Alò	Mary Tyler Moore, Tony Randall	animation	
Ilona Arrives with the Rain	Sergio Cabrera	Margarita Rosa de Francisco, Imanol Arias	drama	
Jane Eyre	Franco Zeffirelli	Charlotte Gainsbourg, William Hurt, Anna Paquin	drama	
Jack Frusciante Left the Band	Enza Negroni	Stefano Accorsi, Violante Placido	teen drama	
Luna e l'altra	Maurizio Nichetti	Maurizio Nichetti, Iaia Forte, Aurelio Fierro	Comedy, Fantasy	2 Nastro d'Argento. Golden Globe nominee
La lupa	Gabriele Lavia	Monica Guerritore, Raoul Bova, Michele Placido, Giancarlo Giannini	drama	
La mia generazione	Wilma Labate	Francesca Neri, Silvio Orlando, Claudio Amendola, Stefano Accorsi	Drama	4 Awards
The Mysterious Enchanter	Pupi Avati	Stefano Dionisi, Carlo Cecchi	horror	
The Nymph	Sergio Cabrera	Raoul Bova, Stefania Sandrelli	comedy-drama	
Opening Day of Close-Up	Nanni Moretti	Nanni Moretti	Short film	Screened at the 1996 Cannes Film Festival
Papà dice messa	Renato Pozzetto	Renato Pozzetto, Teo Teocoli	comedy	
Un paradiso di bugie	Stefania Casini	Antonella Ponziani, Claudio Amendola, Monica Scattini	comedy	
Penniless Hearts	Giuseppe Piccioni	Margherita Buy, Giulio Scarpati	comedy	
Pianese Nunzio, Fourteen in May (Pianese Nunzio, 14 anni a maggio)	Antonio Capuano	Fabrizio Bentivoglio	Gay Drama	
The Quiet Room	Rolf de Heer	Celine O'Leary, Chloe Ferguson, Paul Blackwell	Drama	Australian-Italian-French co-production
Return to Home Gori	Alessandro Benvenuti	Alessandro Benvenuti, Sabrina Ferilli	comedy	
Silenzio si nasce	Giovanni Veronesi	Sergio Castellitto, Paolo Rossi	comedy	
Sostiene Pereira	Roberto Faenza	Marcello Mastroianni, Daniel Auteuil, Joaquim de Almeida, Nicoletta Braschi, Stefano Dionisi, Marthe Keller	Drama	Based on Antonio Tabucchi's novel. David di Donatello for Best Actor (Mastroianni)
Stealing Beauty (Io ballo da sola)	Bernardo Bertolucci	Liv Tyler, Joseph Fiennes, Jeremy Irons	Drama	
Stella's Favor (Mi fai un favore)	Giancarlo Scarchilli	Ornella Muti, Claudio Bigagli, Jo Champa	comedy	
The Stendhal Syndrome	Dario Argento	Asia Argento, Thomas Kretschmann	Thriller	
Strangled Lives	Ricky Tognazzi	Vincent Lindon, Sabrina Ferilli	crime	Entered into the 46th Berlin International Film Festival
The Teddy Bear	Jacques Deray	Alain Delon, Francesca Dellera	thriller	
Traveling Companion	Peter Del Monte	Asia Argento, Michel Piccoli	drama	Screened at the 1996 Cannes Film Festival
Tre	Christian De Sica	Christian De Sica, Anna Galiena, Leo Gullotta	comedy	
Va' dove ti porta il cuore	Cristina Comencini	Virna Lisi, Margherita Buy, Tchéky Karyo	romance drama	
Vesna Goes Fast	Carlo Mazzacurati	Tereza Zajickova, Antonio Albanese, Silvio Orlando	drama	
We Free Kings (I magi randagi)	Sergio Citti	Silvio Orlando, Patrick Bauchau, Rolf Zacher, Laura Betti, Franco Citti, Ninetto Davoli, Gastone Moschin	Comedy	Nastro d'Argento for Best Script
