= Nastro d'Argento for Best Director =

Italian film award

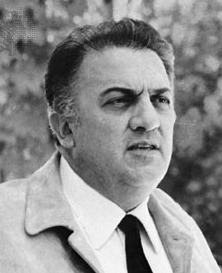
Frederico Fellini holds the record for most Nastro d'Argento awards (7).

The Nastro d'Argento (Silver Ribbon) for Best Director (Italian: Nastro d'argento al regista del miglior film) is a film award bestowed annually as part of the Nastro d'Argento awards since 1946, organized by the Italian National Association of Film Journalists (Sindacato Nazionale dei Giornalisti Cinematografici Italiani or SNGCI), the national association of Italian film critics.

This is the list of Nastro d'Argento awards for Best Director. Federico Fellini is the record holder with seven Nastro d'Argento awards for Best Director received from 1954 to 1984 (also the only one awarded in two consecutive editions, in 1954 in 1955 for the films I vitelloni and La Strada), followed by Luchino Visconti, Gianni Amelio, and Giuseppe Tornatore, with four awards each.

== 1940s ==
- 1946
  - Alessandro Blasetti - Un giorno nella vita
  - Vittorio De Sica - Shoeshine
- 1947 - Roberto Rossellini - Paisan
- 1948
  - Alberto Lattuada - Flesh Will Surrender
  - Giuseppe De Santis - Tragic Hunt
- 1949 - Vittorio De Sica - Bicycle Thieves

== 1950s ==
- 1950 - Augusto Genina - Heaven over the Marshes
- 1951 - Alessandro Blasetti - Father's Dilemma
- 1952 - Renato Castellani - Two Cents Worth of Hope
- 1953 - Luigi Zampa - The City Stands Trial
- 1954 - Federico Fellini - I Vitelloni
- 1955 - Federico Fellini - La Strada
- 1956 - Michelangelo Antonioni - Le Amiche
- 1957 - Pietro Germi - The Railroad Man
- 1958 - Federico Fellini - Nights of Cabiria
- 1959 - Pietro Germi - A Man of Straw

== 1960s ==
- 1960 - Roberto Rossellini - General della Rovere
- 1961 - Luchino Visconti - Rocco and His Brothers
- 1962 - Michelangelo Antonioni - La Notte
- 1963
  - Nanni Loy - The Four Days of Naples
  - Francesco Rosi - Salvatore Giuliano
- 1964 - Federico Fellini - 8½
- 1965 - Pier Paolo Pasolini - The Gospel According to St. Matthew
- 1966 - Antonio Pietrangeli - I Knew Her Well
- 1967 - Gillo Pontecorvo - The Battle of Algiers
- 1968 - Elio Petri - We Still Kill the Old Way
- 1969 - Franco Zeffirelli - Romeo and Juliet

== 1970s ==
- 1970 - Luchino Visconti - The Damned
- 1971 - Elio Petri - Investigation of a Citizen Above Suspicion
- 1972 - Luchino Visconti - Death in Venice
- 1973 - Bernardo Bertolucci - Last Tango in Paris
- 1974 - Federico Fellini - Amarcord
- 1975 - Luchino Visconti - Conversation Piece
- 1976 - Michelangelo Antonioni - The Passenger
- 1977 - Valerio Zurlini - The Desert of the Tartars
- 1978 - Paolo and Vittorio Taviani - Padre Padrone
- 1979 - Ermanno Olmi - The Tree of Wooden Clogs

== 1980s ==
- 1980 - Federico Fellini - City of Women
- 1981 - Francesco Rosi - Tre fratelli
- 1982 - Marco Ferreri - Tales of Ordinary Madness
- 1983 - Paolo and Vittorio Taviani - The Night of the Shooting Stars
- 1984
  - Pupi Avati - A School Outing
  - Federico Fellini - And the Ship Sails On
- 1985 - Sergio Leone - Once Upon a Time in America
- 1986 - Mario Monicelli - Speriamo che sia femmina
- 1987 - Ettore Scola - The Family
- 1988 - Bernardo Bertolucci - The Last Emperor
- 1989 - Ermanno Olmi - The Legend of the Holy Drinker

== 1990s ==
- 1990 - Pupi Avati - The Story of Boys & Girls
- 1991 - Gianni Amelio - Open Doors
- 1992 - Gabriele Salvatores - Mediterraneo
- 1993 - Gianni Amelio - The Stolen Children
- 1994 - Nanni Moretti - Caro diario
- 1995 - Gianni Amelio - Lamerica
- 1996 - Giuseppe Tornatore - The Star Maker
- 1997 - Maurizio Nichetti - Luna e l'altra
- 1998 - Roberto Benigni - Life Is Beautiful
- 1999 - Giuseppe Tornatore - The Legend of 1900

== 2000s ==
- 2000 - Silvio Soldini - Bread and Tulips
- 2001 - Nanni Moretti - The Son's Room
- 2002 - Marco Bellocchio - My Mother's Smile
- 2003 - Gabriele Salvatores - I'm Not Scared
- 2004 - Marco Tullio Giordana - The Best of Youth
- 2005 - Gianni Amelio - The Keys to the House
- 2006 - Michele Placido - Romanzo Criminale
- 2007 - Giuseppe Tornatore - The Unknown Woman
- 2008 - Paolo Virzì - Tutta la vita davanti
- 2009 - Paolo Sorrentino - Il Divo

== 2010s ==
- 2010 - Paolo Virzì - The First Beautiful Thing
- 2011 - Nanni Moretti - Habemus Papam
- 2012 - Paolo Sorrentino - This Must Be the Place
- 2013 - Giuseppe Tornatore - The Best Offer
- 2014 - Paolo Virzì - Human Capital
- 2015 - Paolo Sorrentino - Youth
- 2016 - Paolo Virzì - Like Crazy
- 2017 - Gianni Amelio - Tenderness
- 2018 - Matteo Garrone - Dogman
- 2019 - Marco Bellocchio - The Traitor

== 2020s ==
- 2020 - Matteo Garrone - Pinocchio
- 2021 - Emma Dante - The Macaluso Sisters
- 2022 - Mario Martone - Nostalgia and The King of Laughter
- 2023 - Marco Bellocchio - Kidnapped
- 2024 - Matteo Garrone - Io capitano
- 2025 - Gabriele Mainetti - Forbidden City

== See also ==
- David di Donatello for Best Director
- Cinema of Italy
