= Mariella Valentini =

Italian actress

- Born: 23 June 1959 (age 67); Milan, Italy
- Occupation: actress

Mariella Valentini (born 23 June 1959) is an Italian actress.

== Life and career ==
Born in Milan, Valentini studied acting at the Accademia dei Filodrammatici and in a mime school. In 1983, she made her film debut in the comedy film Come dire. Prolific in film, television, and on stage, she was nominated twice in the best supporting actress category at the David di Donatello, in 1989 for Nanni Moretti's Red Wood Pigeon and in 1991 for Maurizio Nichetti's To Want to Fly.

== Selected filmography ==
- The Mass Is Ended (1985)
- Red Wood Pigeon (1988)
- Maya (1989)
- To Want to Fly (1990)
- Traces of an Amorous Life (1990)
- Vietato ai minori (1992)
- Love Burns (1994)
- Weird Tales (1994)
- State Secret (1995)
- Porzûs (1997)
- Commercial Break (1997)
- Gasoline (2001)
- To Sleep Next To Her (2004)
- In questo mondo di ladri (2004)
- The Tiger and the Snow (2005)
- Piano, solo (2007)
- Il bambino cattivo (2013)
- A Brighter Tomorrow (2023)
