= Lidia Broccolino =

Italian film, television and stage actress

- Born: 10 July 1958 (age 68); Chieti, Italy
- Occupation: Actress

Lidia Broccolino (born 10 July 1958) is an Italian film, television and stage actress.

== Life and career ==
Born Lidia Broccolini in Chieti, she debuted in 1982, in the indie drama Fuori dal giorno. She became first known thanks to Pupi Avati, who chose her to play one of the main roles, the delicate Laura, in his critically appreciated Una gita scolastica. For her performance Broccolino won the Silver Ribbon for best new actress. In the following years Broccolino worked again with Avati in two films, as well as with other notable directors including Marco Bellocchio, Peter Del Monte, Maurizio Nichetti and Francesca Archibugi.

== Selected filmography ==
- A School Outing (1983)
- Summer Games (1984)
- Graduation Party (1985)
- Sweets from a Stranger (1987)
- Julia and Julia (1987)
- The Belt (1989)
- Brothers and Sisters (1992)
- The Great Pumpkin (1993)
- Stefano Quantestorie (1993)
- Never Again as Before (2005)
