= To Want to Fly =

Volere volare
- Theatrical release poster.
- Directed by: Guido Manuli; Maurizio Nichetti
- Written by: Guido Manuli; Maurizio Nichetti
- Produced by: Mario Cecchi Gori; Vittorio Cecchi Gori; Ernesto Di Sabro
- Starring: Maurizio Nichetti; Angela Finocchiaro; Mariella Valentini; Patrizio Roversi
- Cinematography: Mario Battistoni
- Edited by: Rita Rossi
- Music by: Manuel De Sica; Peter Westheimer
- Production company: Pentafilm - Bambù
- Distributed by: Variety Distribution (Italy) Fine Line Features (United States)
- Release date: 1 March 1991
- Running time: 94 minutes
- Country: Italy
- Language: Italian

Volere volare (To Want to Fly) is a 1991 Italian comedy film co-written, co-directed by and starring Maurizio Nichetti. It is a live-action animated film. The male lead is a man who dubs sound effects for cartoons and who is slowly turning into a cartoon. Right before becoming a cartoon, he meets a woman with a very unusual job with whom he falls in love. His transformation complicates both his private and professional life.

== Plot summary ==
Maurizio is a funny and clumsy Italian voice actor and sound effects artist for old American cartoons, while his brother and business partner does the same for pornographic films. Martina is a self-styled "social worker" who charges harmless men with unusual desires a fee to act out their fantasies, such as a taxi driver who enjoys terrifying passengers with stunt driving. The two meet, and fall in love. One day, however, Maurizio suffers an accident that slowly starts to turn him into a cartoon.

== Cast ==
- Maurizio Nichetti ... Maurizio 'Sbaffino'
- Angela Finocchiaro ... Martina
- Mariella Valentini ... Loredana
- Patrizio Roversi ... Patrizio
- Remo Remotti ... The 'Child'
- Mario Gravier ... Architect at Home #1
- Luigi Gravier ... Architect at Home #2
- Renato Scarpa ... Clerk
- Massimo Sarchielli ... Chef
- Osvaldo Salvi ... Necrophyle man
- Lisa Biondi ... Necrophyle woman
- Enrico Grazioli ... Taxi driver
- Mario Pardi ... Thief
- Valeria Cavalli ... Woman on the street
- Rocco Cosentino ... Shop assistant
- Sergio Cosentino ... Shop assistant
- Aldo Izzo ... Client
- Riccardo Magherini ... Client in store of Loredana
- Rosanna Olmo ... Dubber
- Regina Stagnitti ... Actress in movie
- Lidia Biondi
