= 50th Venice International Film Festival =

1993 film festival in Italy

- Festival poster
- Location: Venice, Italy
- Founded: 1932
- Awards: Golden Lion: Short Cuts; Three Colours: Blue
- Festival date: 31 August – 11 September 1993
- Website: Website

Venice Film Festival chronology
- 51st 49th

The 50th annual Venice International Film Festival was held on 31 August to 11 September 1993.

Australian filmmaker Peter Weir was the Jury President of the main competition.

The Golden Lion winners were: Short Cuts directed by Robert Altman, and Three Colours: Blue directed by Krzysztof Kieślowski.

== Jury ==
=== Main Competition ===
The following people comprised the 1993 jury:

- Peter Weir, Australian filmmaker - Jury President
- Mohamed Camara, Guinean filmmaker and actor
- Nelson Pereira dos Santos, Brazilian filmmaker
- Carla Gravina, Italian actress
- James Ivory, British filmmaker and producer
- Chen Kaige, Chinese filmmaker
- Abdulah Sidran, Bosnian writer
- Giuseppe Tornatore, Italian filmmaker

== Official Sections ==
=== In competition ===
English title	Original title	Director(s)	Production country
1, 2, 3, Sun	Un, deux, trois, soleil	Bertrand Blier	France
Alas for Me	Hélas pour moi	Jean-Luc Godard	France
Bad Boy Bubby		Rolf de Heer	Australia, Italy
Chatterbox	杂嘴子	Liu Miaomiao	China
Conversation with a Cupboard Man	Rozmowa z człowiekiem z szafy	Mariusz Grzegorzek	Poland
Dangerous Game	Snake Eyes	Abel Ferrara	Italy, United States
Even Cowgirls Get the Blues		Gus Van Sant	United States
Here on Earth	Aqui na Terra	João Botelho	Portugal, United Kingdom
I Don't Want to Talk About It	De eso no se habla	María Luisa Bemberg	Argentina, Italy
Kosh ba kosh	Кош-ба-кош	Bakhtyar Khudojnazarov	Tajikistan, Russia, Switzerland, Germany, Japan
Next Time the Fire	La prossima volta il fuoco	Fabio Carpi	Italy, France, Switzerland
Outrage!	¡Dispara!	Carlos Saura	Spain, Italy
Shadow of a Doubt	L'ombre du doute	Aline Issermann	France
Short Cuts		Robert Altman	United States
A Soul Split in Two	Un'anima divisa in due	Silvio Soldini	Italy, Switzerland, France
Temptation of a Monk	誘僧	Clara Law	Hong Kong
Three Colours: Blue	Trois couleurs: Bleu	Krzysztof Kieślowski	France, Poland, Switzerland
Where Are You? I'm Here	Dove siete? Io sono qui	Liliana Cavani	Italy

=== Out of competition ===
- The Age of Innocence (Martin Scorsese)
- A Bronx Tale (Robert De Niro)
- Jurassic Park (Steven Spielberg)
- The Secret of the Old Woods (Ermanno Olmi)
- Manhattan Murder Mystery (Woody Allen)

=== Special Screenings ===
- Pursued (restored, Raoul Walsh)
- La naissance de l'amour (Philippe Garrel)
- Johnny Guitar (restored, Nicholas Ray)
- Donersen Islic Cal (Orhan Oguz)
- High Boot Benny (Joe Comerford)
- Sono Kido Wo Tohtte (Kon Ichikawa)
- Searching for Bobby Fischer (Steven Zaillian)
- Fermière à Montfaucon (Éric Rohmer)
- L'Arbre, le maire et la médiathèque (Éric Rohmer)
- Vigyazok (Sándor Sára)
- The Hollow Men (Joseph Kay, John Yorick)
- La estrategia del caracol (Sergio Cabrera)
- Succede un quarantotto (Nicola Caracciolo, Valerio E. Marino)

=== Venetian Nights ===
- L'Enfant lion (Patrick Grandperret)
- Posse (Mario Van Peebles)
- La madre muerta (Juanma Bajo Ulloa)
- In the Line of Fire (Wolfgang Petersen)
- Diki Vostok (Rachid Nougmanov)
- What' s Love Got to Do with It (Brian Gibson)
- The Fugitive (Andrew Davis)
- Boxing Helena (Jennifer Chambers Lynch)
- Kalifornia (Dominic Sena)
- Dave (Ivan Reitman)
- Quattro bravi ragazzi (Claudio Camarca)

=== Italian Panorama ===
- Il giorno di San Sebastiano (Pasquale Scimeca)
- Condannato a nozze (Giuseppe Piccioni)
- E quando lei morì fu lutto nazionale (Lucio Gaudino)
- Portagli i miei saluti (Gianna Maria Garbelli)
- Mille bolle blu (Leone Pompucci)
- Lest (Giulio Base)

=== Window on Images ===
- Zeit Der Goetter (Lutz Dammbeck)
- Hercules Returns (David Parker)
- Terre d' Avellaneda (Daniele Incalcaterra)
- Strapped (Forest Whitaker)
- Children of Fate: Life and Death in a Sicilian Family (Andrew Young, Susan Todd)
- 80 mq - Ottantametriquadri (Cecilia Calvi, Dido Castelli, Luca D'Ascanio, Luca Manfredi, Ignazio Agosta)
- Lettre pour l... (Roman Goupil)
- Manhattan by Numbers (Amir Naderi)
- Utopia, utopia, per piccina che tu sia (Umberto Marino)
- Thirty Two Short Films About Glenn Gould (François Girard)
- Metisse (Mathieu Kassovitz)
- Bells from the Deep (Werner Herzog)
- Memories and Dreams (Lynn Maree Milburn)
- The Clean Up (Jane Weinstock)
- Echoes of Time (Ian Rosenfeld)
- L' écriture de Dieu (H.P.Schwerfel)
- Der Fenster Putzer (Veit Helmer)
- La memoria permessa (Pier Paolo Gandini)
- Le jour du bac (Thomas Bardinet)
- The Obit Writer (Brian Cox)
- Oreste a Tor Bella Monaca (Carolos Zonars)
- Otonal (Maria Novaro)
- Swan Song (Kenneth Branagh)

== Independent Sections ==
=== Venice International Film Critics' Week ===
The following feature films were selected to be screened as In Competition for this section:

English title	Original title	Director(s)	Production country
Il Tuffo		Massimo Martella	Italy
Moonlight Boy	Yue guang shao nian	Yu Wei-Yen	Taiwan
New Germany	Neues Deutschland	Philip Gröning, Uwe Janson, Gerd Kroske, Dani Levy, Maris Pfeiffer	Germany
Public Access		Bryan Singer	United States
Son of the Shark	Le fils du requin	Agnès Merlet	France
Supplì		Vincenzo Verdecchi	Italy
Touchia		Rachid Benhadj	Algeria, France

== Official Awards ==
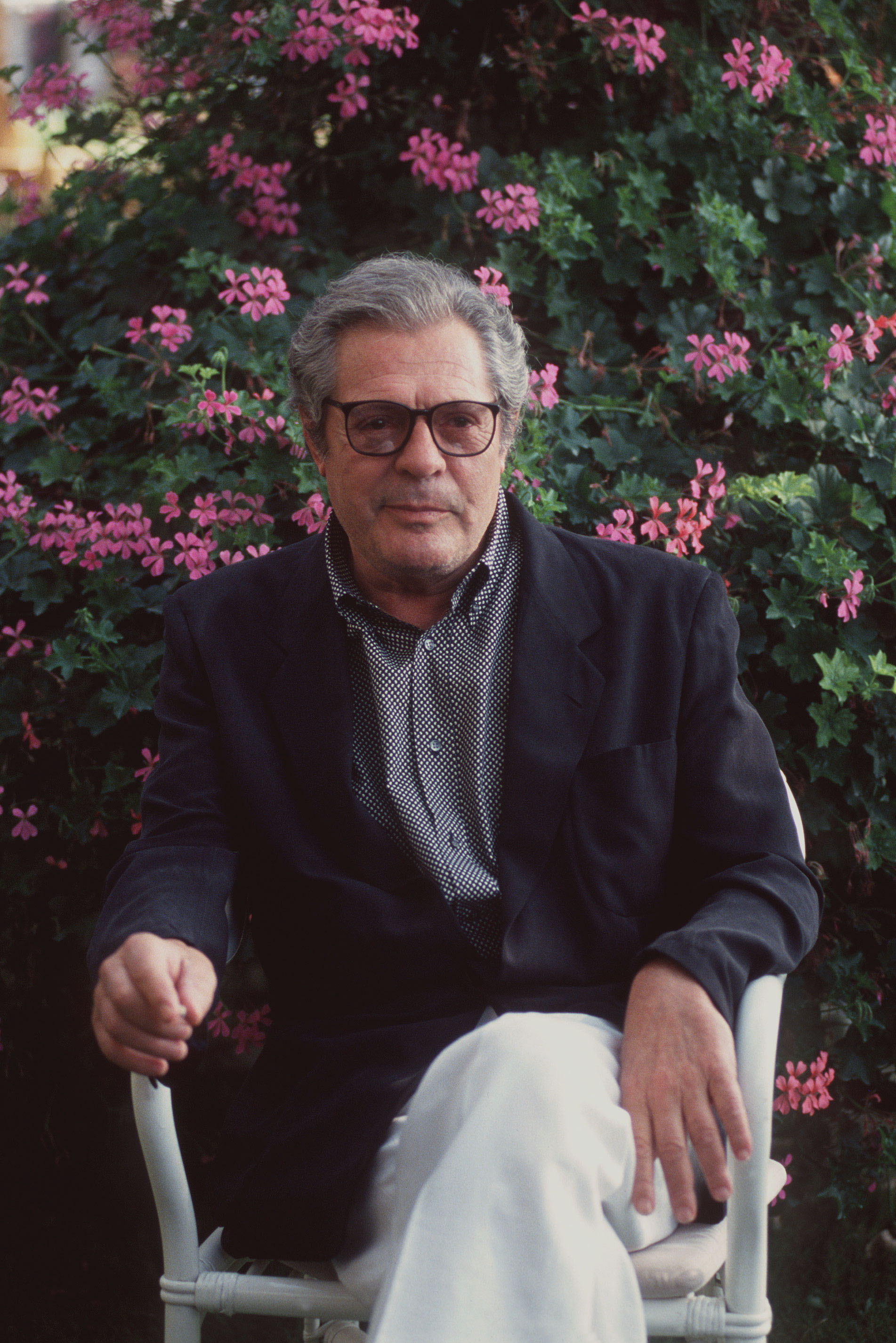
Marcello Mastroianni, Volpi Cup Best Supporting Actor winner at 50th Venice International Film Festival

=== Main Competition ===
- Golden Lion:
  - Short Cuts by Robert Altman
  - Three Colours: Blue by Krzysztof Kieślowski
- Silver Lion: Kosh ba kosh by Bakhtyar Khudojnazarov
- Grand Special Jury Prize: Bad Boy Bubby by Rolf de Heer
- Golden Osella:
  - Best Cinematography: Slawomir Idziak for Three Colors: Blue
  - Best Music: Cheb Khaled for 1, 2, 3, Sun
- Volpi Cup for Best Actor: Fabrizio Bentivoglio for Un'anima divisa in due
  - Best Supporting Actor: Marcello Mastroianni for 1, 2, 3, Sun
- Volpi Cup for Best Actress: Juliette Binoche for Three Colors: Blue
  - Best Supporting Actress: Anna Bonaiuto for Dove siete? Io sono qui
- Volpi Cup for Best Ensemble Cast: Short Cuts

=== Career Golden Lion ===
- Claudia Cardinale
- Robert De Niro
- Roman Polanski
- Steven Spielberg

== Independent Awards ==
=== The President of the Italian Senate's Gold Medal ===
- Za zui zi by Miaomiao Liu

=== Pietro Bianchi Award ===
- Suso Cecchi d'Amico

=== Elvira Notari Prize ===
- Martin Scorsese and Michelle Pfeiffer for The Age of Innocence

=== Grand Prize of the European Academy ===
- 1, 2, 3, Sun by Bertrand Blier

=== AIACE Award ===
- La donna del moro by Mauro Borrelli
- Fuori da Qui by Alessandro Tannoia
