= Silvia Cohen =

Italian actress (born 1959)

- Born: 24 April 1959 (age 67); Paris, France
- Occupation: Actress

Silvia Cohen (born 24 April 1959) is an Italian actress.

== Life and career ==
Born in Paris into a family of Jewish origins, at young age Cohen moved with her family to Milan, where she studied acting at the Accademia dei Filodrammatici. She debuted on stage at just 18 years old in 1977, and made her film debut in 1983 in Pasquale Festa Campanile's comedy film Segni particolari: bellissimo. In the early 1990s, she started appearing in main roles, in art films and high-profile television productions. She was nominated twice at the Nastro d'Argento awards, in 1996 as best supporting actress for Weird Tales and in 1998 as best actress for Commercial Break.
