= Liu Miaomiao =

Liu Miaomiao may refer to:

- Liu Miaomiao (director) (born 1962), Chinese film director
- Liu Miaomiao (film editor), see A World Without Thieves
- Liu Miaomiao (athlete) (born 1989), Paralympic long jumper from China
