= Ornaghi =

Ornaghi is a surname. Notable people with the surname include:

- Lorenzo Ornaghi (born 1948), Italian academic and politician
- Luigi Ornaghi (1931-2006), Italian actor and farmer
