= Renato Scarpa =

Italian actor (1939–2021)

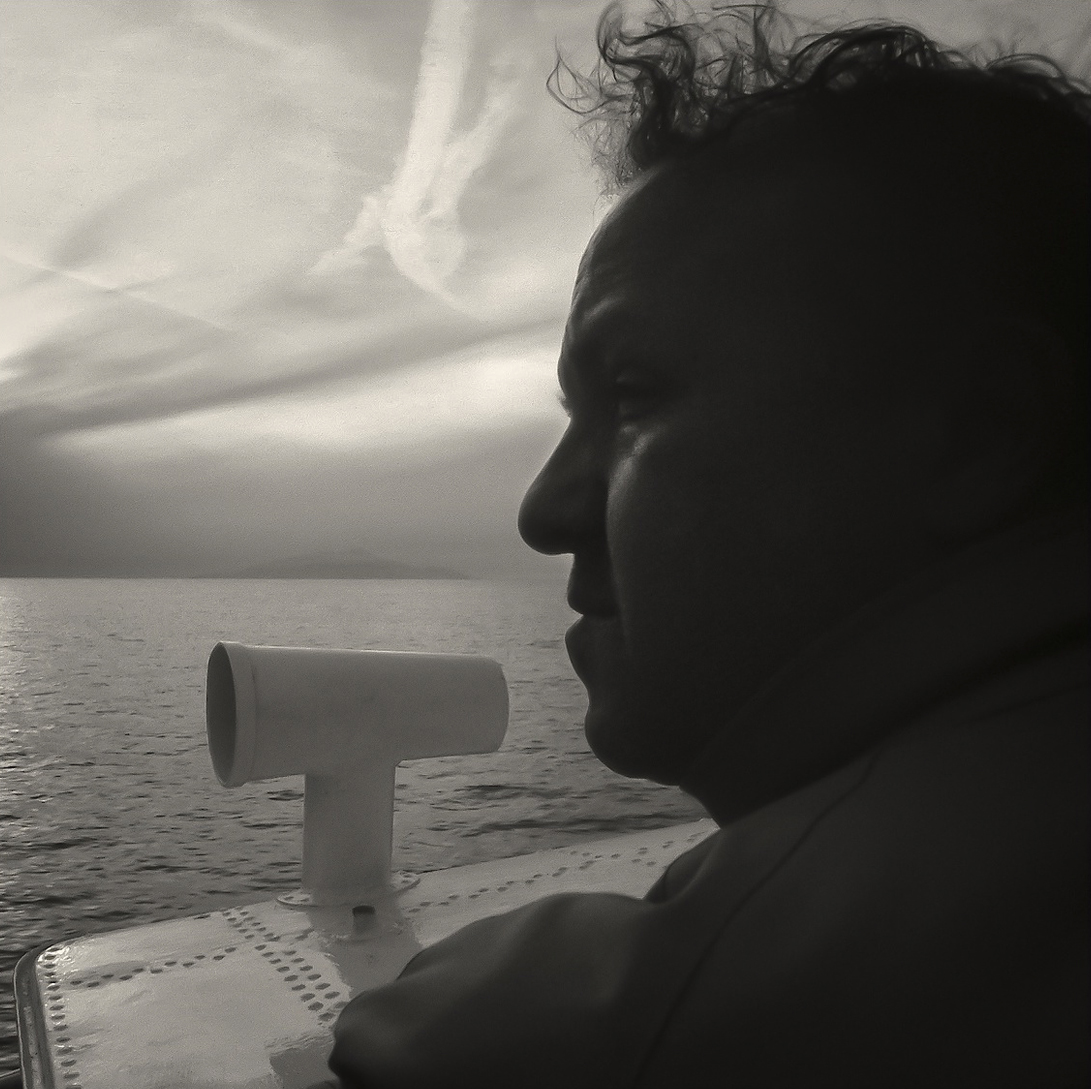
- Scarpa in 1988
- Born: 14 September 1939; Milan, Italy
- Died: 30 December 2021 (aged 82); Rome, Italy
- Occupation: Actor
- Years active: 1969–2021

Renato Scarpa (14 September 1939 – 30 December 2021) was an Italian film actor. He appeared in 85 films from 1969 to 2019.

Scarpa died on 30 December 2021, at the age of 82.

== Selected filmography ==
- Under the Sign of Scorpio (1969)
- Nel nome del padre (1971) – Father Corazza
- St. Michael Had a Rooster (1972) – Battistrada
- Don't Look Now (1973) – Inspector Longhi
- Giordano Bruno (1973) – Fra Tragagliolo
- Somewhere Beyond Love (1974) – Doctor
- E cominciò il viaggio nella vertigine (1974)
- Policewoman (1974) – Dottor Camillotti, il farmacista
- Piedone a Hong Kong (1975) – Inspector Morabito
- The Messiah (1975) – Herod's brother
- I giorni della chimera (1975)
- Colpita da improvviso benessere (1976) – Director
- Suspiria (1977) – Prof. Verdegast
- An Average Little Man (1977) – Prete
- Il mostro (1977) – Livraghi
- Beyond Good and Evil (1977) – Psychiatrist
- Standard (1978)
- A Dangerous Toy (1979) – The Gun Dealer
- Fun Is Beautiful (1980) – Sergio
- Men or Not Men (1980) – Cane Nero
- Bionda fragola (1980) – Lo psicanalista
- Buddy Goes West (1981) – Logan
- I'm Starting from Three (1981) – Robertino
- West of Paperino (1981) – Don Vincenzo
- Grog (1982)
- Spaghetti House (1982) – Il ragioniere
- I'm Going to Live by Myself (1982)
- Love Letters (1983) – Le journaliste
- Signore e signori (1984) – Misoni
- Così parlò Bellavista (1984) – Il dottor Cazzaniga
- Fatto su misura (1985)
- A.D. (1985, TV Mini-Series) – Lucius Marinus
- A me mi piace (1985)
- Il mistero di Bellavista (1985) – Dr. Cazzaniga
- Via Montenapoleone (1987) – Marito di Francesca
- L'estate sta finendo (1987) – Biacciconi
- Julia and Julia (1987) – Il commissario
- Laggiù nella giungla (1988) – Spartaco
- 32 dicembre (1988) – Oscar Tricarico, il figlio (segment "La gialla farfalla")
- The Icicle Thief (1989) – Don Italo
- Traces of an Amorous Life (1990) – Giuseppe Breschi
- To Want to Fly (1991) – Clerk
- Les secrets professionnels du Dr Apfelglück (1991) – Michel Martinelli
- The Raffle (1991)
- Ordinaria sopravvivenza (1992)
- Stefano Quantestorie (1993) – Stefano's Father
- A Soul Split in Two (1993) – Direttore del grande magazzino
- Gli extra... (1994)
- Il Postino (1994) – Telegrapher
- Only You (1994) – Alitalia Gate Attendant
- Fade out (Dissolvenza al nero) (1994)
- Joseph (1995, TV Mini-Series) – Baker
- Sons of Trinity (1995) – Pablo
- Croce e delizia (1995) – Il produttore
- A Ray of Sun (1997) – Pianista
- Roseanna's Grave (1997) – Doctor
- On Guard (1997) – Paolo
- Esther (1999, TV Movie) – Eunuch
- The Talented Mr. Ripley (1999) – Tailor
- A casa di Irma (1999) – Sciur Franco
- Tobia al caffè (2000) – Proprietario caffè
- Azzurro (2000) – Giorgio
- The Son's Room (2001) – Headmaster
- Honolulu Baby (2001) – Dott. Anselmi
- Ravanello pallido (2001) – Serafino Pace
- Ribelli per caso (2001) – Armando
- Una cosa in mente. Giuseppe Benedetto Cottolengo (2004) – Ministro degli Interni
- Incidenti (2005) – Fantasma di un collega
- Un amore su misura (2007) – Giudy
- Marcello Marcello (2008) – Don Tommaso
- Palestrina - Prince of Music (2009) – Monsignor Cotta
- The Tourist (2010) – Arturo the Tailor
- We Have a Pope (2011) – Cardinal Gregori
- Diaz – Don’t Clean Up This Blood (2012) – Anselmo Vitali
- Long Live Freedom (2013) – Arrighi
- Santini's Network (2013) – Fortunato Santini
- Cain (2014) – Bartolomeo Zurletti
- L'ultimo tango (2015) – God
- Mia Madre (2015) – Luciano
- Tale of Tales (2015) – Barber
- Tommaso (2016) – Mario
- Sweet Democracy (2016) – Senatore Calcaterra
- Le verità (2017) – Prof. Attanasio
- Manuel (2017) – Sor Attilio
- The Stolen Caravaggio (2018) – Arturo Onofri
- Nevermind (2018)
- Domani è un altro giorno (2019) – Direttore Teatro
- The Two Popes (2019) – Camerlengo
- Per tutta la vita (2021) – Emilio (final film role)
