= Weird Tales (film) =

- Directed by: Sandro Baldoni
- Written by: Johnny Dell Orto; Sandro Baldoni
- Produced by: Film Master Film
- Starring: Ivano Marescotti; Silvia Cohen; Mariella Valentini; Alfredo Pea
- Cinematography: Renato Alfarano
- Edited by: Dede Dedevitis; Vilma Conti
- Release date: 1994
- Country: Italy
- Language: Italian

Weird Tales (Italian: Strane storie, also known as Strange Stories) is a 1994 Italian anthology surreal black comedy film written and directed by Sandro Baldoni. For this film Baldoni won the Nastro d'Argento for Best New Director.

== Cast ==
- Ivano Marescotti: cittadino, uomo al supermarket, marito famiglia del nord
- Silvia Cohen: donna single, moglie famiglia del sud
- Mariella Valentini: moglie famiglia del nord
- Alfredo Pea: marito famiglia del sud
- Stefano Accorsi: trasgressivo
