= Mille bolle blu =

- Directed by: Leone Pompucci
- Written by: Paolo Rossi; Leone Pompucci; Filippo Pichi
- Cinematography: Massimo Pau
- Music by: Franco Piersanti
- Distributed by: Penta Distribuzione
- Release date: 1993
- Language: Italian

Mille bolle blu ("A thousand blue bubbles") is a 1993 Italian comedy film written and directed by Leone Pompucci.

It was screened in the Italian Panorama section at the 50th Venice International Film Festival. For this film Leone Pompucci won the David di Donatello for Best New Director.

== Cast ==
- Claudio Bigagli: Guido
- Antonio Catania: Fugitive
- Clelia Rondinella: Fugitive's Wife
- Stefano Dionisi: Antonio
- Evelina Gori: Guido's Mother
- Paolo Bonacelli: Mario
- Orazio Stracuzzi: Gino
- Ludovica Modugno: Gino's Wife
- Gina Rovere: Maid
- Matteo Fadda: Sandrino
- Stefano Masciarelli: Sandrino's Father
- Carla Benedetti: Sandrino's Mother
- Stefania Montorsi: Bride
- Maurizio Mattioli: Cantoni
- Gigi Proietti: Narrator (voice)

== See also ==
- List of Italian films of 1993
