= Stefano Quantestorie =

- Italian theatrical release poster
- Directed by: Maurizio Nichetti
- Written by: Maurizio Nichetti; Laura Fischetto
- Produced by: Ernesto Di Sarro
- Starring: Maurizio Nichetti; Elena Sofia Ricci; Amanda Sandrelli; Caterina Sylos Labini; James Thierrée; Renato Scarpa; Milena Vukotic
- Cinematography: Mario Battistoni
- Music by: Rocco Tanica & Feiez
- Distributed by: Variety Distribution
- Release date: 1993
- Country: Italy
- Language: Italian

Stefano Quantestorie is a 1993 Italian comedy film co-written, directed and starring Maurizio Nichetti.

== Plot ==
Stefano, forty years old, is looking back at his past and the lost opportunities to live it in a different way: if at seventeen he had moved to America, if he had become an aviator, if he had graduated and had become a professor, if he had become a police officer... destiny will give him a chance to meet all his doppelgangers.

== Cast ==
- Maurizio Nichetti: Stefano
- James Thiérrée: Stefano at 17
- Elena Sofia Ricci: Angela
- Caterina Sylos Labini: Costanza
- Amanda Sandrelli: Chiara
- Milena Vukotic: Mother of Stefano
- Renato Scarpa: Father of Stefano
- Lidia Broccolino: Marta

== See also ==
List of Italian films of 1993
