= Luna e l'altra =

- Directed by: Maurizio Nichetti
- Written by: Maurizio Nichetti; Stefano Albé; Nello Correale; Laura Fischetto
- Starring: Iaia Forte; Maurizio Nichetti
- Cinematography: Luca Bigazzi
- Music by: Carlo Siliotto
- Release date: 1996
- Running time: 100 minutes
- Country: Italy
- Language: Italian

Luna e l'altra is a 1996 Italian fantasy film directed, written and starred by Maurizio Nichetti.

For this film Iaia Forte was awarded with a Silver Ribbon for Best Actress. Maurizio Nichetti also won a Silver Ribbon for Best Director and was awarded best actor at the Malaga International Fantastic Film Festival.

The film was also nominated for a Golden Globe Award for Best Foreign Language Film, and won the Corbeau D'Or at the Brussels International Fantastic Film Festival.

== Cast ==
- Iaia Forte: Luna di Capua/Ombra
- Maurizio Nichetti: Angelo Franchini
- Aurelio Fierro: Luna's father
- Luigi Maria Burruano: The director
- Ivano Marescotti: Caimi
- Eva Robin's
- Eraldo Turra

== See also ==
- List of Italian films of 1996
