= Ratataplan =

1979 Italian comedy film

- Directed by: Maurizio Nichetti
- Written by: Maurizio Nichetti
- Produced by: Franco Cristaldi; Nicola Carraro
- Starring: Maurizio Nichetti
- Cinematography: Mario Battistoni
- Music by: Detto Mariano
- Release date: 1979
- Country: Italy
- Language: Italian

Ratataplan is a 1979 Italian low budget comedy film directed, written by and starring Maurizio Nichetti. The film turned out to be highly successful, launching Nichetti's career and earning him a Silver Ribbon for Best New Director.

== Plot ==
Life offers little satisfaction to the recent graduate engineer Colombo: in a job interview in which candidates are asked to draw a tree, he is the only one not hired by the company since his drawing, instead of being monochromatic and schematic as the executives would like, is colorful and lush. Colombo lives in a battered but lively palace with a railing; he has four neighbors: a woman who is perpetually pregnant, the members of the theater cooperative "Quelli di Grock", a girl always intent on carrying heaps of rags, and a ramshackle dance school attended by a student he is in love with, but she won't even look at him.

He is, in his own way, a genius of electronics and automation (he has built a contraption that prepares his breakfast and brings it to him in bed, and which hands him his clothes for the day), however his job is that of a waiter at a remote drinks kiosk at the top of Montagnetta di San Siro. The owner is a fat and alcoholic hag who is the only customer of herself and spends her days being served beers by Colombo. The routine is interrupted when the wheelchair-using manager of an international summit has a heart attack: one of those present at the summit calls a nearby bar to bring a glass of water, but by mistake dials the number of the kiosk.

Colombo finds himself having to run across Milan carrying the glass of water on a tray, which during the journey suffers a sequence of ridiculous accidents: it is first poured into the helmet of a traffic cop, then some painters accidentally dip the brushes in it, it is soiled by the unloading of a truck, pigeons eat birdseed in it and finally an insect falls into it. Once at its destination, the concoction is still drunk by the now cyanotic boss, who not only recovers, but miraculously gets up from his wheelchair laughing and hopping. It would therefore seem that Colombo's life is at a turning point: at the kiosk a long line of paralytics is queuing to drink the miraculous concoction, which Colombo prepares by skilfully reproducing on the spot all the previous misadventures. But then the boss buys the entire kiosk with millions to turn it into a sanctuary.

The hag, who now advertises herself as a saint, is enthusiastic about the project while Colombo is suddenly unemployed. The engineer, to make ends meet, improvises himself as a violinist for the deranged theatrical cooperative which is based in his condominium. His life, however, does not improve much: the impresario, strict and grim, comes to the courtyard to gather the actors and leave for a show but, not seeing them arrive, goes up to the messy apartment where they sleep and wakes them up with a trumpet; they rush to wash up the dishes, throwing them from one part of the kitchen to the other in a sort of hilarious assembly line, and are finally loaded badly into the van.

Colombo, who finds himself sleeping in the condominium garbage can, is also awakened abruptly. After grotesque incidents along the way, the company arrives in the courtyard of a rural town scattered in the fog, where it sets up a pathetic show (the improbable Magic Show) in the midst of chickens, geese and cows. In the meantime, the impresario does nothing but devour everything that comes his way, even the flowers that the local children give him. The spectators, at first only perplexed by the insipid staging, then take up shovels and pitchforks and force the actors to a long and ruinous escape on foot.

Back home exhausted, Colombo is again snubbed by the dancer he is in love with, who instead rushes to help a neighbor. He then decides to take action but, too shy to woo the girl himself, builds a remote controlled automaton made in his own image. The animatronic is sent to the balcony, and Colombo finally manages to attract the attention of the dancer. The two go to the disco; Colombo, who remains at home to pilot the automaton, follows the evening on a screen and all seems to go well until the control system explodes: the automaton is jammed and continually orders the waiter two drinks, sitting next to the now completely drunk girl.

Alerted by the explosion, the girl who constantly collects rags rushes to Colombo's house. She expresses her liking for his cheerful and extravagant home, and then invites him to follow her into a warehouse full of colorful rags. There the two take turns dressing up and rolling around, having finally found happiness in a completely unexpected way.

== Cast ==
- Maurizio Nichetti as Colombo
- Angela Finocchiaro as the girl of the rags
- Edi Angelillo as the girl of the robot
- Lidia Biondi as the pregnant woman
- Roland Topor as the boss
- Luigi Ornaghi as the farmer

== See also ==
- List of Italian films of 1979
