= A Soul Split in Two =

- Directed by: Silvio Soldini
- Written by: Silvio Soldini; Roberto Tiraboschi
- Starring: Fabrizio Bentivoglio; Mária Bakó
- Cinematography: Luca Bigazzi
- Music by: Giovanni Venosta
- Release date: 1993
- Running time: 124 minutes
- Language: Italian

A Soul Split in Two (Italian: Un'anima divisa in due, also known as A Soul Divided in Two) is a 1993 Italian romance-drama film directed by Silvio Soldini.

The film entered into the 50th Venice International Film Festival, where Fabrizio Bentivoglio was awarded with the Volpi Cup for best actor.

== Plot ==
Pietro Di Leo, security officer of a department store in Milan, where the girl he is dating also works as a make-up artist, is separated from his wife and with a son that he only sees on weekends. He is a very dissatisfied man, whose psychosomatic suffering (loss of nose bleeds, outbursts of anger, visions) reveals a situation of profound discomfort. One day, however, he meets Pabe, a young Roma who has to get rid of the warehouse and who will then let go when she is caught stealing a perfume. At first intrigued, but then increasingly fascinated, Pietro decides to help her, first giving false testimony in a theft trial of which Pabe was accused, and then taking her away from Milan and her family, running away together in a car without destination, from hotel to hotel. hotel. Initially Pabe does not let herself be touched, she wears her clothing that identifies her as Roma at all and finds it hard to get used to living in a closed room, without begging or stealing. Having failed to work as a seamstress, Pabe is hired as a waitress in a hotel when she has already cut her hair, put on ordinary clothes, removed her earrings, and passes herself off as an Italian raised with a Greek accent. This happens in the evolution of the sentimental story between Pietro and Pabe, between intimate fears and public embarrassments.

Their life takes a turn: they move to Ancona and get married (it is not clear whether it is a civil or symbolic marriage), to start a new life. Their relationship has the approval of Pietro's ex-father-in-law, who forges an emotional bond with the girl. Pietro is totally immersed in his new life, he no longer has psychosomatic attacks, he takes off his bourgeois suit and has his mustache lengthened; Pabe, who was a virgin and perhaps now is also pregnant, is in love and happy with him, but from the outside she continually suffers moral violence (the sight of a Roma expelled from the bar where she is instead sitting because she is believed to be Italian; the encounter with another Roma in poverty who stops her by asking her for money first and then, recognizing her as a gypsy, tries to talk to her) and physical violence (a hotel customer tries to rape her).

Pietro's father-in-law is found dead in bed by Pabe herself who is shocked by the emotional misery of the funeral that is dedicated to the old man she had grown fond of in the meantime (here is a beautiful scene in which the girl describes what death means and the value of the funeral party for gypsies). The final blow comes when the hotel manager asks her if the rumors circulating about her real ethnic identity are true, because in this case, the first person to be suspected of any theft would be her. At this point Pabe leaves the apartment without leaving any notice to Pietro (except the chain that had united them from the beginning), returns to Milan to the nomad camp from which she had escaped, but after getting out of the taxi she sees that the camp is no longer there.

== Cast ==
- Fabrizio Bentivoglio as Pietro De Leo
- Maria Bakò as Pabe
- Felice Andreasi as Savino
- Philippine Leroy-Beaulieu as Miriam
- Zinedine Soualem as Abid
- Renato Scarpa
- Ivano Marescotti
- Giuseppe Cederna
- Moni Ovadia
- Giuseppe Battiston
- Antonio Albanese

== See also ==
- List of Italian films of 1993
