= Maya (1989 film) =

1989 film

- Directed by: Marcello Avallone
- Screenplay by: Marcello Avallone; Andrea Purgatori; Maurizio Tedesco
- Produced by: Maurizio Tedesco
- Starring: Peter Phelps; Mariella Valentini
- Cinematography: Silvano Ippoliti
- Edited by: Adriano Tagliavia
- Music by: Gabriele Ducros
- Release date: 1989
- Country: Italy
- Language: English

Maya is a 1989 Italian horror film co-written and directed by Marcello Avallone and starring Peter Phelps and Mariella Valentini.

== Cast ==
- Peter Phelps as Peter
- Mariella Valentini as Lisa Slivak
- William Berger as Salomon Slivak
- Cyrus Elias as Dr. Santos
- Mariangélica Ayala as Jahaira
- Mirella D'Angelo as Laura
- Erich Wildpret as Larry
- Antonello Fassari as Sid
- Antonella Antinori as Maria
- Gustavo Camacho

== Production ==
The film was produced by Reteitalia. It was shot between Yucatán, Venezuela and Elios Studios in Rome. It had a budget of about two and a half billion lire. The director cited Carlos Castaneda's books as a major source of inspiration for the script.

== Reception ==
The film was a box office disappointment. In his book Spinegrinder, Clive Davies panned the film, referring to it as "useless, boring crap" in which "the best part is a bloody finger wrestling match near the beginning. After that, tune out". La Stampa described it as "100 minutes of cheap thrills", noting that "the best thing about the film will be the finale shot in the right atmosphere of suspense, which does not justify certain earlier bloody narrative excesses." In his book Italian Horror Film Directors, Robert Paul praised it, referring to it as "an obscure gem" and "an overlooked film". Film historian Roberto Curti described it as very ambitious, but with a "confused" script and "unlikely", "bland" characters.
