= Stefania Montorsi =

Italian director and actress (born 1968)

- Born: 12 April 1968 (age 58); Bari, Italy
- Occupation: Actress
- Years active: 1988-present

Stefania Montorsi (born 12 April 1968) is an Italian director and actress. She has appeared in more than ten films since 1988.

== Early life and career ==
Born in Bari, in the Carbonara-Santa Rita district, she has always lived in Rome; after a theatrical training, she made her debut on television and later in cinema, where she starred, among other things, in Mille bolle blu, directed by Leone Pompucci, Bits and Pieces, directed by Antonello Grimaldi, and Other Men, directed by Claudio Bonivento.

The 1993 film by Daniele Luchetti, The Storm Is Coming, which marks the beginning of an artistic and sentimental partnership, becoming his wife. With Luchetti she acts in Little Teachers and in Ginger and Cinnamon. In 2000 she starred in the international production Nora, with Ewan McGregor and Susan Lynch.

Among his productions for the small screen, we remember the tv films The Ogre, directed by Lamberto Bava, and Cuore in gola, directed by Stefania Casini, both from 1988, the tv miniseries Classe di ferro (1989), directed by Bruno Corbucci, and the TV movie Moses, directed by Roger Young.

In October 2010 her first novel Amori fuoricorso was released for the publisher Sonzogno RCS.

== Selected filmography ==
Year	Title	Role	Notes
1988	The Ogre		
1992	The Storm Is Coming		
1993	Mille bolle blu		
1997	Other Men		
1997	Little Teachers		
2002	Ginger and Cinnamon		
2010	La nostra vita		
2016	Worldly Girl		
