= Julia and Julia =

1987 film by Peter Del Monte

- Italian Poster
- Directed by: Peter Del Monte
- Written by: Peter Del Monte; Silvia Napolitano; Sandro Petraglia
- Produced by: Francesco Pinto; Gaetano Stucchi
- Starring: Kathleen Turner; Gabriel Byrne; Sting; Gabriele Ferzetti
- Cinematography: Giuseppe Rotunno
- Edited by: Michael Chandler
- Music by: Maurice Jarre
- Production company: Radiotelevisione Italiana (RAI)
- Release date: 3 September 1987 (Italy)
- Running time: 97 minutes
- Country: Italy
- Languages: Italian; English
- Budget: $10 million
- Box office: $901,364

Julia and Julia (Italian: Giulia e Giulia) is a 1987 Italian drama film directed by Peter Del Monte. The screenplay by Silvia Napolitano, Sandro Petraglia, Joseph Minion, and Del Monte is based on a story by Napolitano.

== Plot ==
Julia, a young American woman living in Trieste, Italy, is widowed on her wedding day when her husband Paolo is killed in a car accident for which she is partly responsible. Six years later, Julia still lives in Trieste and works full-time at a local tourist travel office. She still keeps in close touch with Paolo's parents, but is cold and distant to her co-workers at the office and refuses to move on with her life or resume dating.

One evening after work, Julia drives her car through a mysterious supernatural mist before returning to her apartment, where she discovers a strange woman living there. Across the street, in the elegant home she and Paolo had purchased and which she never sold, she finds him and their five-year-old son Marco treating her as if they have been together all along and the fatal car accident never happened. Paolo is a workaholic dedicated to his career as a ship designer, and a restless Julia has taken a lover: British photographer Daniel.

Bewildered but happy to have her husband back, Julia tries to mend her marriage, but suddenly finds herself once again widowed and alone two days later when she finds herself transported back to the current reality that she knows. Over the next several weeks, Julia begins to slip back and forth between two different worlds, but she finds it increasingly difficult to determine which is reality and which is fantasy and starts to question her own sanity.

Julia's two worlds become more similar when, in her widowed world, she meets Daniel after he walks into the travel office; smitten with him, she asks him out on a date. Reluctant at first, Daniel accepts, and they become involved in a sexual relationship just like her extramarital tryst with Daniel in her fantasy world in which her husband is alive. When Daniel becomes more possessive and controlling with Julia, she tries to break it off but he refuses to let their relationship end. Determined to free herself from a loveless romance, Julia ends up stabbing him to death in his hotel room one evening and dumping the body into the bay.

Finally free from her relationship with Daniel, Julia quits her job and focuses entirely on her romance with Paolo and their son. However, several days later, while walking to the market to do food shopping, Julia is picked up by the police, who question her about Daniel's disappearance. When pressed to give an alibi for the day Daniel went missing, Julia tells the police investigator that she was with her husband despite having a sexual romance with Daniel. When the inspector tells Julia that her husband has been dead for the last six years, she breaks down, refusing to believe that Paolo is dead. Soon after, she confesses to killing Daniel.

In the final scene, Julia is seen residing in a mental hospital where she tells Paolo's visiting mother that she now feels at peace with herself. She spends all her time alone in her room writing letters to Paolo and his parents while she keeps one memento that she took from her fantasy world: a photo of her, Paolo, and Marco together. It is left ambiguous whether this photo is real or just a figment of her fantasy world.

== Cast ==
- Kathleen Turner as Julia Finzi
- Gabriel Byrne as Paolo Finzi
- Sting as Daniel Osler
- Gabriele Ferzetti as Paolo's Father
- Angela Goodwin as Paolo's Mother
- Alexander Van Wyk as Marco Finzi
- Renato Scarpa as Police Inspector
- John Steiner as Alex
- Yorgo Voyagis as Goffredo
- Lidia Broccolino as Carla

== Production ==
This was the first feature shot using the Sony HDVS wideband analog high-definition video technique and then transferred to 35mm film. All but a few scenes were shot in high-definition. The film was shot over 79 days.

== Release ==
The film debuted at the Venice Film Festival in 1987 and received a limited release in the United States in January the following year by Cinecom, earning $901,364. It was released in foreign markets as Giulia e Giulia.

== Critical reception ==
In his review in The New York Times, Vincent Canby called the film "a not-very-spooky melodrama" and added, "[it] is minor movie making, but it does prove two things: that Kathleen Turner has become the kind of star who can carry even third-rate fiction without losing her beautiful, voluptuous cool, and that high-definition tape (on which this was initially shot) can be transferred to film and look as good as anything shot on film to start with."

Roger Ebert of the Chicago Sun-Times observed "The construction of the story is ingenious and perverse and has a kind of inner logic of its own...This is the kind of movie that proves unbearably frustrating to some people, who demand explanations and resent obscurity. I have seen so many movies recently in which absolutely everything could be predicted that I found Julia and Julia perversely entertaining."

In the Washington Post, Rita Kempley described the film as "peculiar" and added "The unstable Julia must have seemed like a juicy opportunity for Turner, who likes to test herself with diverse roles."
