= Commercial Break =

- Directed by: Sandro Baldoni
- Cinematography: Renato Alfarano
- Music by: Carlo Siliotto
- Release date: 1997
- Country: Italy
- Language: Italian

Commercial Break (Italian: Consigli per gli acquisti, also known as Satisfaction, or Your Money Back) is a 1997 Italian black comedy film written and directed by Sandro Baldoni.

== Plot ==
An importer of Argentine meat has to deal with a large amount of rotting flesh, which is full of maggots. He decides to recycle it as dog food. An advertisement is produced that tries to get people to feed their pets with nutritious worms.

== Cast ==
- Ennio Fantastichini: Giulio Stucchi
- Ivano Marescotti: Gianfranco Pedone
- Silvia Cohen: Wanda Crespi Cicogna
- Mariella Valentini: Titti Melidoni
- Carlo Croccolo: Ciro Esposito
- Maurizio Crozza: Bonelli
- Cosimo Cinieri: Prof. Gianluigi Querciasecca
- Barbara Cupisti: Mary Cantucci
