= Malo, Veneto =

Malo
- Comune
- Comune di Malo
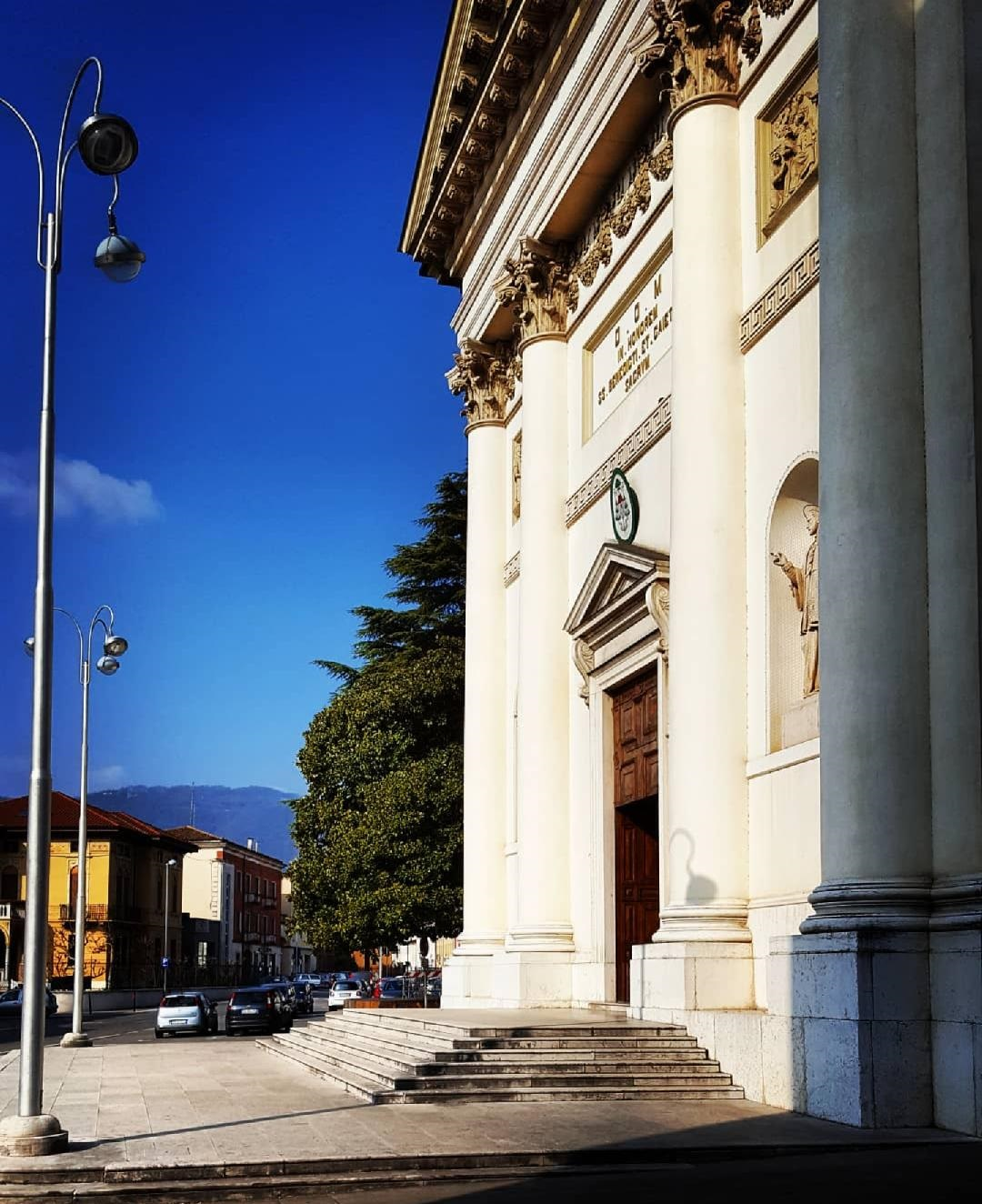
- View of Malo

- Location within Italy Location within Veneto
- Coordinates: 45°40′N 11°25′E
- Country: Italy
- Region: Veneto
- Province: Vicenza (VI)
- Frazioni: Case, Molina, San Tomio

Government
  - Mayor: Moreno Marsetti

Area
  - Total: 30.53 km^{2} (11.79 sq mi)
- Elevation: 116 m (381 ft)

Population (31 December 2015)
  - Total: 14,951
  - Density: 489.7/km^{2} (1,268/sq mi)
- Demonym: Maladensi
- Time zone: UTC+1 (CET)
  - Summer (DST): UTC+2 (CEST)
- Postal code: 36034
- Dialing code: 0445
- Website: Official website

Malo is a town in the province of Vicenza, Veneto, Italy. SP46 goes through it.

Italian writer Luigi Meneghello was born in Malo in 1922 and remembered it in his first book Libera nos a Malo. Sights include the Villa Porto, a Renaissance patrician villa designed by Andrea Palladio.

== Twin towns ==
- Peuerbach, Austria, since 1997

== Sources ==
- (Google Maps)
