= Next Time the Fire =

- Film poster
- Directed by: Fabio Carpi
- Cinematography: Renato Berta
- Edited by: Alfredo Muschietti
- Release date: 1993
- Running time: 78 minutes

Next Time the Fire (Italian: La prossima volta il fuoco, French: Et ensuite le feu) is a 1993 Italian-French-Swiss drama film written and directed by Fabio Carpi.

The film was entered into the main competition at the 50th Venice International Film Festival.

== Cast ==
- Jean Rochefort as Amedeo
- Marie-Christine Barrault as Elena
- Jacqueline Lustig as Gloria
- Lidija Kozlovič as Diana
- Lila Kedrova as The Mother

== See also ==
- List of Italian films of 1993
