= L'albero delle zoccole =

1995 pornographic film by Leo Salemi

- Directed by: Leo Salemi
- Written by: Leo Salemi
- Starring: Luigi Ornaghi: Batistì; Barbarella (actress): Bimba
- Cinematography: Enzo Lanni
- Music by: Antonello Pesenti
- Release date: 1995
- Running time: 85 minutes
- Country: Italy
- Language: Italian

L'albero delle zoccole is a 1995 Italian pornographic film written and directed by Leo Salemi, and starring Luigi Ornaghi and Barbarella. It is considered the sexy parody of the film The Tree of Wooden Clogs.

== Plot ==
The main protagonist, Batistì lives on a farm with his granddaughter Teresì and often has erotic dreams.

== Cast ==
- Luigi Ornaghi as Batistì
- Barbarella (actress) as Bimba
- Boris Bianco
- Cristina Colecchia as Manya
- Adriano Galli
- Katia Kargo
- Francesca Ray
- Gina Rome

== Production and Release ==
The film was a porn-parody of The Tree of Wooden Clogs, in which Luigi Ornaghi played the lead role of Batistì. Ornaghi's decision to star in the porn-parody as well angered the director of the original film, Ermanno Olmi .

In popular Italian slang, the word zoccole means sluts, and its phonetic similarity to zoccoli (clogs) inspired a marketing campaign that, however, failed to gain much traction.

== See also ==
- List of Italian films of 1995
