= Little Teachers =

- Directed by: Daniele Luchetti
- Written by: Luigi Meneghello; Daniele Luchetti; Domenico Starnone; Stefano Rulli; Sandro Petraglia
- Produced by: Vittorio Cecchi Gori; Rita Rusic
- Starring: Stefano Accorsi; Stefania Montorsi; Giorgio Pasotti
- Cinematography: Beppe Lanci
- Music by: Dario Lucantoni
- Release date: 1998
- Running time: 122 minutes
- Language: Italian

Little Teachers (Italian: I piccoli maestri) is a 1998 Italian war drama film written and directed by Daniele Luchetti. Based on the novel I piccoli maestri by Luigi Meneghello, it entered the main competition at the 55th Venice International Film Festival.

== Plot ==
Autumn of 1943: a group of university students from Vicenza opposes the Nazi invasion by joining the partisans at the plateau of the Sette Comuni. Soon, however, the youngsters realize that they are unable to face the horrors of war and receive the support of a worker, a sailor, a sergeant of the alpini and their esteemed professor, Toni Giuriolo.

== Cast ==
- Stefano Accorsi as Gigi
- Stefania Montorsi as Simonetta
- Giorgio Pasotti as Enrico
- Diego Gianesini as Lelio
- Filippo Sandon as Bene
- Marco Paolini as Toni
- Massimo Santelia as Marietto
- Marco Piras as Dante
- Stefano Scandaletti as Rodino
- Manuel Donato as Nello
- Luigi Mercanzin as Moretto
