= Libera (film) =

- Directed by: Pappi Corsicato
- Written by: Pappi Corsicato
- Produced by: Claudio Vecchio
- Starring: Iaia Forte
- Cinematography: Roberto Meddi; Raffaele Mertes
- Edited by: Fabio Nunziata
- Release date: 1993
- Language: Italian

Libera (also known as Free) is a 1993 Italian comedy film written and directed by Pappi Corsicato. It consists of three segments, the last of them ("Libera!") was originally a separate short film shot in 1991.

== Plot ==
Each episode is named after the protagonist.

In the first, Aurora, a young woman is married to a very rich man who is never at home and allows her to live comfortably as a "maintained". His only amusement is to help a local priest, singing and irreverent; but soon her husband is arrested for fraud and she, who had had to renounce true love to choose this type of life, will see the house robbed by her ex "Pistoletta", a bricklayer, to whom she had asked for help.

In the second, Carmela, an adolescent ephebic leaves the reformatory and returns to live with his mother in the lower area where he was born. He falls in love with the neighborhood cassette seller, arousing the ire of a girl who is in love with him, who will accuse him of theft in revenge and have him arrested again; shortly before the police arrive, he will discover that what he believed to be his mother is actually the father, a trans who had been abandoned by his wife when he was a baby.

In the third and final episode, Libera, a newsagent who lives from her modest job, discovers her husband's betrayals. With the help of a prostitute friend of hers who introduces him into the house as a maid, she films the cheating spouse with a hidden video camera with the intention of denouncing him. Except that, by mistake, she sells the videotape to a "voyeurist" client who, being satisfied with the film, asks her to get him other similar ones. Thanks to her husband's hot performances, punctually filmed and sold on newsstands, the newsagent becomes rich.

== Cast ==
- Iaia Forte as Aurora/Libera
- Cristina Donadio as Carmela/Aurora's Friend
- Ciro Piscopo as Sebastiano
- Enzo Moscato as Don Arcangelo
- Ninni Bruschetta as Pistoletta
- Vincenzo Peluso as The Compact Cassettes' Vendor
- Cinzia Mirabella as Miriam
- Tosca D'Aquino as Aurora's Friend

== Reception ==
The film premiered at the Forum section of the 43rd Berlin International Film Festival, receiving critical acclaim.

For this film Corsicato won the Nastro d'Argento for Best New Director.

== See also ==
- List of Italian films of 1993
