= Tomorrow We Dance =

- Directed by: Maurizio Nichetti
- Written by: Maurizio Nichetti; Guido Manuli
- Produced by: Franco Cristaldi; Nicola Carraro
- Starring: Mariangela Melato; Maurizio Nichetti
- Cinematography: Mario Battistoni
- Music by: Eugenio Bennato
- Release date: 1982
- Country: Italy
- Language: Italian

Tomorrow We Dance (Italian: Domani si balla!) is a 1982 Italian comedy film written, directed and starring Maurizio Nichetti.

== Plot ==
Aliens send a hypnotic signal through a TV channel, and the signal makes people dance and makes them forget their fears.

== Cast ==
- Mariangela Melato as Mariangela
- Maurizio Nichetti as Maurizio
- Paolo Stoppa as the father
- Elisa Cegani as the mother

== See also ==
- List of Italian films of 1982
