= The Belt (film) =

- UK VHS cover
- Directed by: Giuliana Gamba
- Written by: Piero De Bernardi; Francesca Archibugi; Claudia Sbarigia; Gloria Malatesta
- Cinematography: Luigi Verga
- Music by: Nicola Piovani
- Release date: 1989
- Running time: 93 minutes
- Country: Italy
- Language: Italian

The Belt (Italian: La cintura) is a 1989 Italian erotic drama film directed by Giuliana Gamba. It is based on the drama play with the same name by Alberto Moravia.

== Cast ==
- Eleonora Brigliadori: Bianca Ravelli
- James Russo: Vittorio Di Simone
- Giuliana Calandra: Bianca's Mother
- Riccardo Salvino: Prof. Achille Biondelli
- Anna Bonaiuto: The Judge
- Lidia Broccolino: Bianca's Friend
- Ivano Marescotti: Friend of Bianca's Mother
