= Luigi Ornaghi =

Italian actor and farmer

- Born: 9 December 1931; Treviglio, Kingdom of Italy
- Died: 10 December 2006 (aged 75); Treviglio, Italy
- Occupations: Actor, farmer

Luigi Ornaghi (Treviglio, 9 December 1931 - Treviglio, 10 December 2006) was an Italian actor and farmer.

== Biography ==
Born in Castello Cerreto, a frazione of Treviglio, Ornaghi spent his life working in the fields. He was chosen by Ermanno Olmi to play Batistì, the protagonist of the film The Tree of Wooden Clogs, because the director decided to cast real farmers from Bassa Bergamasca. After the film, Ornaghi came back to his work as a farmer.

There were two exceptions: in 1979, when Ornaghi and other actors from The Tree of Wooden Clogs appeared in Ratataplan, in a sort of cameo; the second was in 1995, when he reprised the role of Batistì in a hardcore pornographic version of Olmi’s film, titled L'albero delle zoccole, that drew scathing criticism from Olmi himself.

He continued working as a farmer until his death from a heart attack on 10 December 2006, the day after his 75th birthday, while working in the fields.

== Filmography ==
=== Cinema ===
- 1978: The Tree of Wooden Clogs, directed by Ermanno Olmi
- 1979: Ratataplan, directed by Maurizio Nichetti
- 1995: L'albero delle zoccole, directed by Leo Salemi
