= Ginger and Cinnamon =

2002 film by Daniele Luchetti

- Italian film poster
- Directed by: Daniele Luchetti
- Written by: Ivan Cotroneo; Daniele Luchetti; Stefania Montorsi
- Produced by: Conchita Airoldi
- Starring: Stefania Montorsi; Giampaolo Morelli; Martina Merlino; Alberto Cucca; Marco Piras; Isabella Cecchi
- Cinematography: Paolo Carnera
- Edited by: Angelo Nicolini
- Music by: Danilo Cherni; Gianfranco Salvatore; Eldar Mansurov
- Release date: 4 April 2003
- Running time: 109 minutes
- Country: Italy
- Language: Italian

Ginger and Cinnamon or Dillo con parole mie is a 2003 Italian comedy film directed by Daniele Luchetti. It was filmed in Greece, on the Ios Island.

== Plot ==
While vacationing on the Greek Isle of Love, a repressed 30-year-old Stefania reluctantly plays chaperon to her precocious and sometimes annoying 14-year-old niece, Meggy, who plans to lose her virginity before the summer is over. Unbeknownst to Stefania, Meggy's chosen man is in fact Stefania's ex-boyfriend. Amidst a mélange of sun rash, broken diets, nervous girls, sleeping bags, orgasms, '80s music, and a little ginger and cinnamon, the two women discover themselves and their sexuality.

== Cast ==
- Stefania Montorsi as Stefania
- Giampaolo Morelli as Andrea
- Martina Merlino as Megghy
- Alberto Cucca as Pippo
- Marco Piras as Marco
- Isabella Cecchi as Amica di Stefania (Stefania's friend)
- Karen Ann McLoughlin as Amica di Marco (Marco's friend)
- Martin Maloney as Party Goer
