= Chatterbox (1993 film) =

- Film poster
- Directed by: Liu Miaomiao
- Written by: Liu Miaomiao; Yang Zhengguang
- Cinematography: Wang Jiuwen
- Edited by: Feng Sihai
- Music by: Wen Zhongjia
- Production company: Children's Film Studio
- Release date: 1993
- Running time: 90 minutes
- Country: China
- Language: Chinese

Chatterbox (Chinese: 杂嘴子, Za zui zi, also known as An Innocent Babbler) is a 1993 Chinese comedy-drama film written and directed by Liu Miaomiao.

The film was entered into the main competition at the 50th edition of the Venice Film Festival, in which it won the President of the Italian Senate's Gold Medal. It also won the Special Jury Prize at the first Beijing College Student Film Festival.

== Plot ==
In the 1980s, there was a child named Minsheng in Jixiang Village in the northwestern mountainous area. He was called "the chatterbox" because of his talkativeness. Minsheng's brother Qunsheng brought his fiancée, Yanmai, home, but Yanmai's father, Ma Liu, forced his daughter to break off the engagement and made a big fuss in Jixiang Village. Minsheng couldn't help but blurt out the truth that Yanmai was hiding in his house, which almost caused a disaster. Fortunately, Yanmai finally married Qunsheng. Shuying's mother warned her son Minsheng to talk less and not cause trouble in the future, but Minsheng still couldn't help his talkative habit and continued to cause trouble. In the end, Qunsheng was killed in the kiln while making firecrackers, and Yanmai returned to her mother's home. The changes in the family made Minsheng gradually become depressed and withdrawn. In the predicament, Minsheng gradually grew up, and later became the first person in the village to be admitted to university.

== Cast ==
- Cao Cuifen as Shu Ying
- Guo Shaoxiong as Wang Laoshi
- Lei Li as Min Sheng
- Lu Xiaoyan as Yan Wai
- Yuan Jing as Qun Sheng
