= Snowball (1995 film) =

- Directed by: Maurizio Nichetti
- Produced by: Ciro Ippolito; Fulvio Lucisano
- Starring: Paolo Villaggio
- Cinematography: Cristiano Pogany
- Music by: Carlo Siliotto
- Release date: 1995
- Country: Italy
- Language: Italian

Snowball (Italian: Palla di neve) is a 1995 Italian adventure comedy film written and directed by Maurizio Nichetti.

== Cast ==
- Paolo Villaggio: Billy Bolla
- Fabiano Vagnarelli: Theo
- Alessandro Haber: Marcov
- Monica Bellucci: Melina
- Leo Gullotta: Sidik
- Anna Falchi: Elena
- Luis Molteni
- Angelo Orlando
- Dong Mei Xiao
- Pietro Ghislandi
- Néstor Garay
- Maurizio Nichetti
