= Luigi Meneghello =

Italian writer and politician (1922–2007)

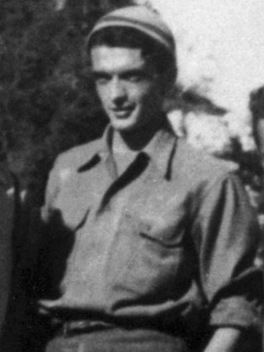
- Born: 16 February 1922; Malo, Veneto, Kingdom of Italy
- Died: 26 June 2007 (aged 85); Thiene, Veneto, Italy
- Occupations: novelist, essayist, academic
- Writing career
- Period: 1963–2004
- Subjects: recent Italian history, the Italian Resistance, teaching

Luigi Meneghello (16 February 1922 – 26 June 2007) was an Italian contemporary writer and scholar.

== Biography ==
Luigi Meneghello was born in Malo, a small town in the countryside near Vicenza, on 16 February 1922. His father was a craftsman and his mother was a teacher. Meneghello entered in 1939 the University of Padua to study philosophy. From 1940 to 1942 worked for Paduan newspaper Il Veneto. In the early Forties, he had his first contacts with anti-fascism and, after a short time in the Army, entered the Partito d'azione and became active in the resistance movement in 1943. Of his early life, he said:

My studies, at Vicenza and Padua, were absurdly 'brilliant', but useless and partly damaging. I was exposed, as a youth, to the effects of a fascist education, and then somehow was re-educated during the war and the civil war, under the protective wings of the Partito d'Azione (Party of Action). I expatriated in 1947-48 and settled in England with my wife Katia. We have no children. My encounter with the culture of the English, and the shock of their language, were for me a determining factor.

— Luigi Meneghello, The Guardian, 17/08/07

In 1945 Meneghello graduated cum laude with a thesis on the philosophy of Benedetto Croce. In 1947 he moved to the University of Reading (England) with a one-year British Council scholarship and afterwards he began teaching aspects of the Italian Renaissance in the English Department. In 1948 he married Katia Bleier, a survivor of Auschwitz. In 1955 a separate Italian section was formed followed by the founding of a Department of Italian Studies in 1961, headed by himself until his retirement in 1980. He was offered, and accepted, a chair as Professor of Italian Literature. After an intense academic activity and as a translator (often with the pseudonym Ugo Varnai), in 1963 he published his first book, part novel, part autobiography, Libera nos a Malo (English translation titled Deliver Us) about the narrow-minded but vital milieu of his home town, Malo. The title is a pun on the Latin words for deliver us from evil and the name of the town. One year later, he published I piccoli maestri (literally, "The Little Teachers"). This book was translated into English in 1967 and published as The Outlaws. This book was considered "one of the few non-rhetorical, and therefore all the more effective, memoirs of the Italian resistance, which is true in every detail." A film version with the same title was directed in 1998 by Daniele Luchetti.

In 1980, Meneghello retired from the University of Reading to devote his time to writing. He lived in London and later in Thiene (near Vicenza), where he moved permanently after his wife's death in 2004. He died there in June 2007.

== Bibliography ==
- Libera nos a Malo (1963, translated into English as Deliver Us by Frederika Randall, Northwestern University Press, 2011)
- I piccoli maestri (1964, translated into English in 1967 as The Outlaws by Raleigh Trevelyan)
- Pomo Pero (1974)
- Fiori italiani (1976)
- L’acqua di Malo (1986)
- Il Tremaio. Note sull’interazione tra lingua e dialetto nelle scritture letterarie (1986)
- Jura (1987)
- Bau-Sète! (1988)
- Leda e la schioppa (1989)
- Rivarotta (1989)
- Che fate quel giovane? (1990)
- Maredè, Maredè (1991)
- Il dispatrio (1993)
- Promemoria (1994)
- Il Turbo e il Chiaro (1996)
- La materia di Reading (1997)
- Le Carte. Volume I: Anni sessanta (1999)
- Le Carte. Volume II: Anni settanta (2000)
- Le Carte. Volume III: Anni ottanta (2001)
- Trapianti. Dall'inglese al vicentino (2002)
- Quaggiù nella biosfera. Tre saggi sul lievito poetico delle scritture (2004)
- La materia di Reading e altri reperti (2005)
