= Iaia Forte =

Italian actress (born 1962)

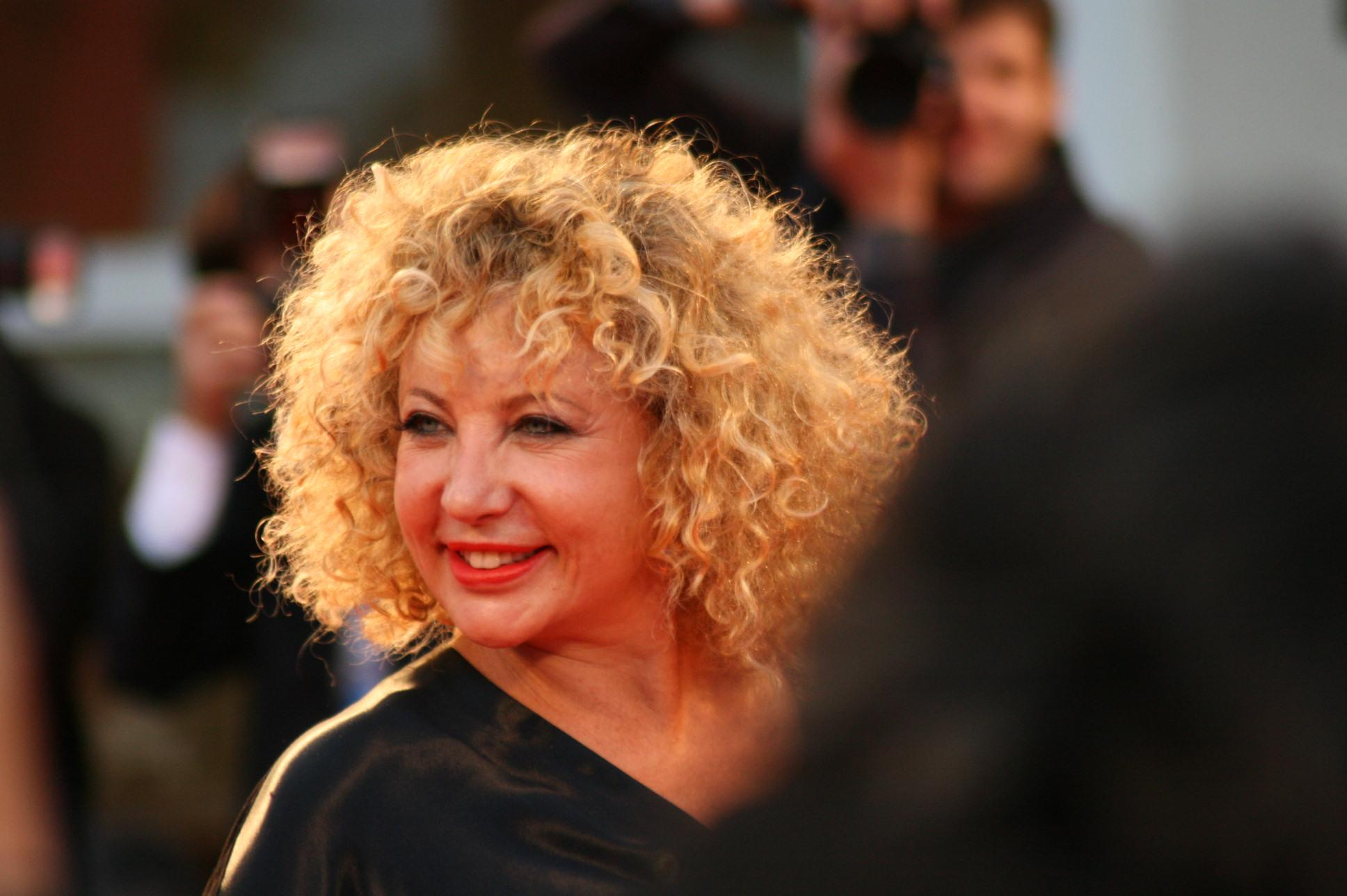
- Forte at the 71st Venice International Film Festival
- Born: Maria Rosaria Forte; 16 March 1962 (age 64); Naples, Italy
- Occupation: Actress

Iaia Forte (born 16 March 1962) is an Italian actress. She is well known for the Maurizio Nichetti's comedy film Luna e l'altra, for which she won a Nastro d'Argento for Best Actress, a Globo d'oro for Best Actress and she was nominated for David di Donatello in the same category.

== Life and career ==
Born in Naples, Forte studied acting at the Centro Sperimentale di Cinematografia in Rome, and made her professional debut with Mario Martone's stage company Teatri Uniti. After several minor roles, she had her breakout with Pappi Corsicato's 1993 anthology film Libera, in which she played three different characters. She was nominated for the Nastro d'Argento as Best Supporting Actress twice, for her roles in Renato De Maria's Paz! and Marco Risi's Three Wives.

== Selected filmography ==
- Grandi magazzini (1986)
- Il burbero (1986)
- Stradivari (1988)
- 'O Re (1989)
- Libera (1993)
- Black Holes (1995)
- Bits and Pieces (1996)
- Luna e l'altra (1996)
- The Vesuvians (1997)
- Rehearsals for War (1998)
- Appassionate (1999)
- Chimera (2001)
- Three Wives (2001)
- Paz! (2002)
- Bimba - È clonata una stella (2002)
- Night Bus (2007)
- The Seed of Discord (2008)
- Bets and Wedding Dresses (2009)
- News from the Excavations (2010)
- Miele (2013)
- The Great Beauty (2013)
- Mafia and Red Tomatoes (2014)
- Leopardi (2014)
- I Killed Napoléon (2015)
- Stories of Love That Cannot Belong to This World (2017)
- Euphoria (2018)
- 5 Is the Perfect Number (2019)
- The King of Laughter (2021)
- The Price of Family (2022)
- Born for You (2023)
- Damned If You Do, Damned If You Don't (2025)
