= The Storm Is Coming =

- Directed by: Daniele Luchetti
- Written by: Stefano Rulli; Sandro Petraglia; Daniele Luchetti
- Starring: Diego Abatantuono; Margherita Buy; Silvio Orlando; Marina Confalone; Eros Pagni
- Cinematography: Franco Di Giacomo
- Edited by: Mirco Garrone
- Music by: Dario Lucantoni
- Distributed by: Variety Distribution
- Release date: 1993
- Language: Italian

The Storm Is Coming (Italian: Arriva la bufera) is a 1993 Italian comedy film written and directed by Daniele Luchetti.

For her performance in this film Marina Confalone won the David di Donatello for Best Supporting Actress.

== Cast ==
- Diego Abatantuono: Damiano Fortezza
- Margherita Buy: Eugenia Fontana
- Silvio Orlando: Mario Solitudine
- Marina Confalone: Emma Fontana
- Stefania Montorsi: Esmeralda Fontana
- Angela Finocchiaro: Concettina
- Eros Pagni: Gerolamo Adelante
