= Guido Manuli =

Italian cartoon animator

- Born: 11 June 1939 (age 86); Cervia, Ravenna, Italy
- Occupation: Animation director
- Years active: 1960–present

Guido Manuli (born 11 June 1939) is an Italian cartoon animator, screenwriter and director.

== Biography ==
Born in Cervia, Manuli started working in the animation field in 1960, and was a close collaborator of Bruno Bozzetto for 18 years, working as a gagman, scriptwriter, and director of animation at Bozzetto Films. He co-directed with Bozzetto the shorts Opera (1973) and Striptease (1977), and made his debut as a sole director with the science-fiction satirical short Fantabiblical (1977). He directed the animation sequences of Maurizio Nichetti's To Want to Fly (1991), and in 2001 the Giuseppe Verdi's Aida-inspired animated film Aida of the Trees. Manuli also directed music videos, advertising shorts, and openings for television shows.

== Selected filmography ==
Shorts

- Fantabiblical (1977)
- Count-Down (1979)
- S.O.S. (1979)
- Erection: To Each His Own (1981)
- Only a Kiss (1983)
- Anijam (1984)
- Incubus (1985)
- +1 -1 (1987)
- Istruzioni per l’uso (1989)
- Trailer (1993)
- Casting (1997)
- Loading (2004)

Feature-length films

- To Want to Fly (1991, co-directed with Maurizio Nichetti)
- L'eroe dei due mondi (1994)
- Monster Mash (2000)
- Aida of the Trees (2001)

Music videos

- La Bionda - "I Wanna Be Your Lover" (1981)
- Rondò Veneziano - "La Serenissima" (1984)
