= A School Outing =

- Italian theatrical release poster by Enzo Sciotti
- Directed by: Pupi Avati
- Written by: Pupi Avati; Antonio Avati
- Starring: Giancarlo Torri; Tiziana Pini; Carlo Delle Piane
- Cinematography: Pasquale Rachini
- Edited by: Amedeo Salfa
- Music by: Riz Ortolani
- Release date: 1983
- Country: Italy
- Language: Italian

A School Outing (Italian: Una gita scolastica) is a 1983 Italian comedy-drama film written and directed by Pupi Avati. It entered the 40° Venice Film Festival. The film won the Nastro d'Argento Awards for Best Director, Best Score, Best Actor, Best New Actress and Best Original Script.

== Plot ==
An old lady recalls the most beautiful memory of her life: a school trip from Bologna to Florence, through the Apennines, on the eve of graduation exam in the early twentieth century. The thirty boys and girls are accompanied by the teacher of letters and drawing. The latter will have a love affair with one of the pupils. But the professor, in love with her, will defend her from scandal.

== Cast ==
- Giancarlo Torri: Augusto Baldi
- Tiziana Pini: Professor Serena Stanzani
- Carlo Delle Piane: Professor Balla
- Lidia Broccolino: Laura
- Rossana Casale: Rossana
- Nik Novecento
- Bob Messini

== See also ==
- List of Italian films of 1983
