= The Tree of Wooden Clogs =

1978 Italian film by Ermanno Olmi

- Original film poster
- Italian: L'albero degli zoccoli
- Directed by: Ermanno Olmi
- Written by: Ermanno Olmi
- Starring: Luigi Ornaghi; Francesca Moriggi; Omar Brignoli
- Cinematography: Ermanno Olmi
- Edited by: Ermanno Olmi
- Release dates: September 21, 1978 (Italy); June 1, 1979 (U.S.)
- Running time: 186 minutes
- Country: Italy
- Language: Lombard

The Tree of Wooden Clogs (Italian: L'albero degli zoccoli) is a 1978 Italian film written and directed by Ermanno Olmi. The film depicts the life of Lombard peasants in a cascina (farmhouse) during the late 19th century. It shares similarities with the earlier Italian neorealist movement, focusing on the lives of the poor and casting actual farmers and locals instead of professional actors.

The Tree of Wooden Clogs received critical acclaim, winning fourteen awards, including the Palme d'Or at Cannes and the César Award for Best Foreign Film. The original version of the movie is spoken in Lombard (the Bergamasque variety, an Eastern Lombard dialect).

In 2008, the film was included in the Italian Ministry of Cultural Heritage's 100 Italian Films to be Saved, recognising it as one of the films that "have changed the collective memory of the country between 1942 and 1978."

== Plot ==
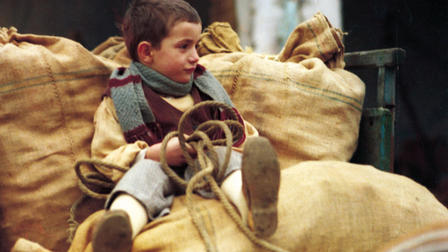
Screenshot

The narrative of The Tree of Wooden Clogs revolves around four peasant families working on farms for the same landlord, striving to maintain a meager existence in the countryside around Bergamo in 1898. Over the course of a year, the film portrays the cycles of life.

Despite noticing the undercurrents of revolution, the peasants largely remain detached from the political unrest. A communist agitator delivers a speech at a local fair, and a newlywed couple witnesses the arrest of political prisoners during a visit to Milan. As spring arrives, the father of one of the families cuts down a tree to craft wooden clogs (an alder tree, referenced in the title, as its wood was traditionally used for this purpose) for his son to wear to school. This incurs the wrath of the land-owner, resulting in the family's eviction. The remaining families watch them depart, offering prayers and reflecting on their own precarious circumstances.

== Cast ==
- Luigi Ornaghi as Batistì
- Francesca Moriggi as Batistina
- Omar Brignoli as Minec
- Antonio Ferrari as Tuni
- Teresa Brescianini as Widow Runk
- Giuseppe Brignoli as Anselmo
- Carlo Rota as Peppino
- Pasqualina Brolis as Teresina
- Massimo Fratus as Pierino
- Francesca Villa as Annetta
- Maria Grazia Caroli as Bettina
- Battista Trevaini as Il Finard
- Giuseppina Langalelli as La Moglie Finarda
- Lorenzo Pedroni as Il nonno Finard
- Felice Cervi as Uslì

== Critical acclaim ==
British filmmaker Mike Leigh praised the film in The Daily Telegraph's 'Film makers on film' interview series, on 19 October 2002. Leigh pays tribute to the film’s humanity, realism, and vast scale. He called the film “extraordinary on a number of levels”, before concluding “this guy [Olmi] is a genius, and that's all there is to it”. Leigh has described Olmi's epic of peasant life in Lombardy as the ultimate location film: " Directly, objectively, yet compassionately, it puts on the screen the great, hard, real adventure of living and surviving from day to day, and from year to year, the experience of ordinary people everywhere...the camera is always in exactly the right place...but the big question, arising out of these truthful and utterly convincing performances achieved by non-actors, always remains: how does he really do it?" When Al Pacino was asked by the AFI what his favourite movie was, he admitted that he "always liked The Tree Of Wooden Clogs." Gene Siskel loved the movie and put it on his list of the 10 Best Films of 1980.

In 2003, The New York Times placed the film on its Best 1000 Movies Ever list.

The film was included by the Vatican in a list of important films compiled in 1995, under the category of "Values".

In 1995, was shot L'albero delle zoccole a pornographic parody of the film, once again starring Luigi Ornaghi in the principal role. In popular Italian, the word zoccole means prostitutes, and its phonetic similarity to zoccoli (clogs) inspired a marketing campaign that, however, failed to gain much traction. Olmi got very angry with Ornaghi for accepting this role.;
