= Fabio Carpi =

Italian director, screenwriter, and author (1925–2018)

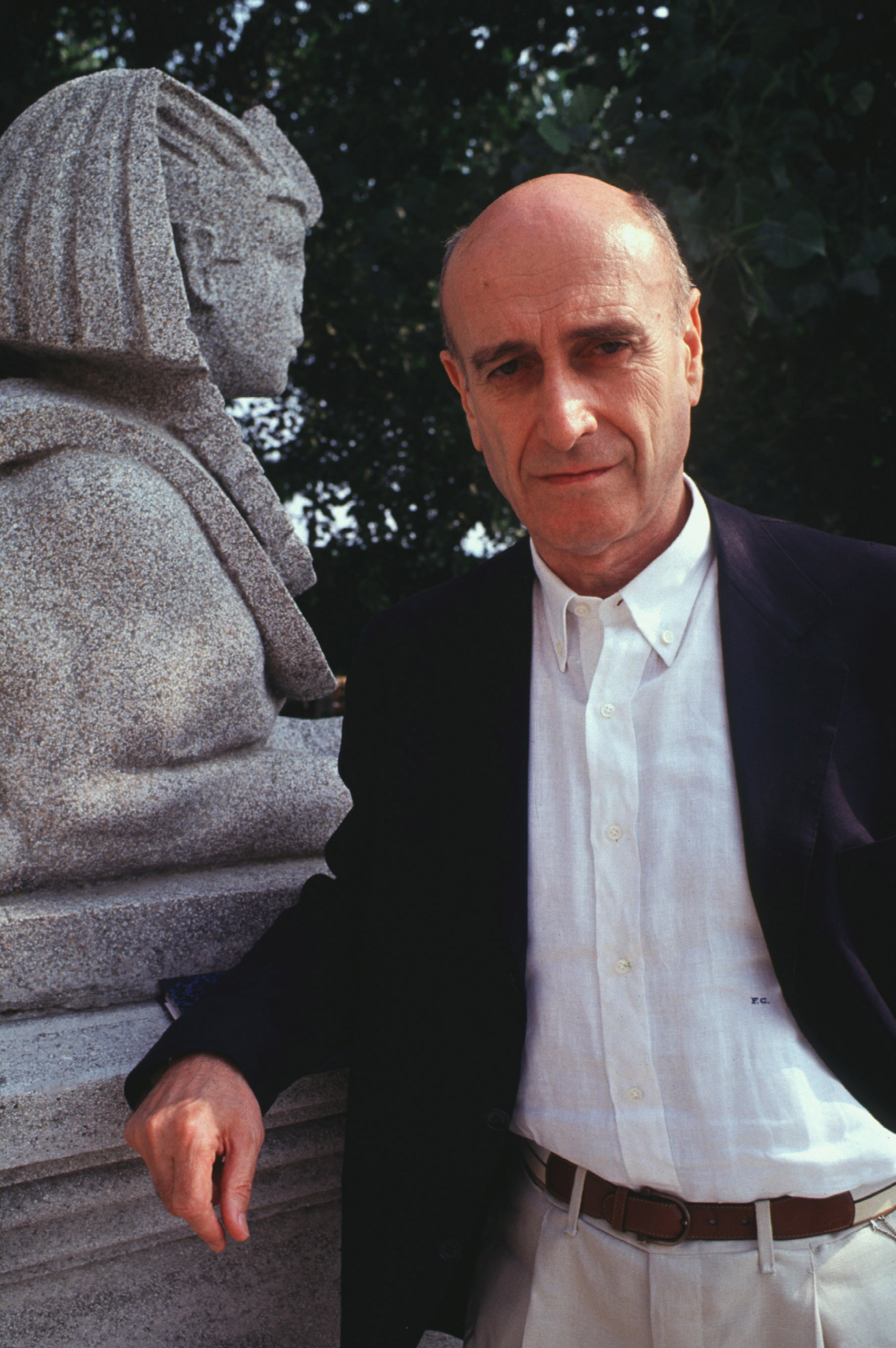
- Born: 19 January 1925; Milan, Italy
- Died: 26 December 2018 (aged 93); Italy
- Occupations: Director, screenwriter

Fabio Carpi (19 January 1925 – 26 December 2018) was an Italian director, screenwriter, and author.

== Life and career ==
Born in Milan, Carpi began his career in the 1940s as a film critic for the newspapers Libera Stampa and L'Unità. He moved to Brazil in 1951 where he started collaborating on some screenplays. He returned to Italy in 1954, and until 1971, he was active as a screenwriter for notable directors such as Antonio Pietrangeli, Dino Risi, and Vittorio De Seta. He won a Nastro d'Argento for the screenplay of Nelo Risi's Diary of a Schizophrenic Girl in 1971. From 1957 he was also a critically acclaimed novelist and essayist. His novel Patchwork won the Bagutta Prize in 1998.

After a 1968 documentary short, in 1972 Carpi made his feature film debut with the drama Corpo d'amore. His films were referred to as "figuratively accurate, literary, often metaphorical and difficult to understand", and "deep explorations of the human psyche".

== Selected filmography ==
- A Flea on the Scales (1953, only screenwriter)
- The Peaceful Age (1974)
- Basileus Quartet (1983)
- Barbablù, Barbablù (1987)
- Necessary Love (1991)
- Next Time the Fire (1993)
