= Lidia Biondi =

Italian actress (1941–2016)

Lidia Biondi (3 February 1941 – 14 June 2016), often credited as Lydia Biondi, was an Italian film and television actress who appeared in more than 40 Italian and foreign films since the 1960s. Her international film credits included Eat Pray Love (2010), starring Julia Roberts, and Letters to Juliet (2010), directed by Gary Winick, in which she appeared opposite Amanda Seyfried and Vanessa Redgrave. Most recently, Biondi appeared in a series of television dramas, including La squadra, Compagni di banco, Il bello delle donne, Diritto di difesa, L'onore e il rispetto, Il Sangue e la Rosa, and Aldo Moro - Il presidente during the 2000s and 2010s.

Biondi was born and brought up in Livorno, Tuscany. She died in Rome on 14 June 2016, at the age of 75.
