= Accademia dei Filodrammatici =

Italian drama school

Coordinates: 45.4672°N 9.1886°E

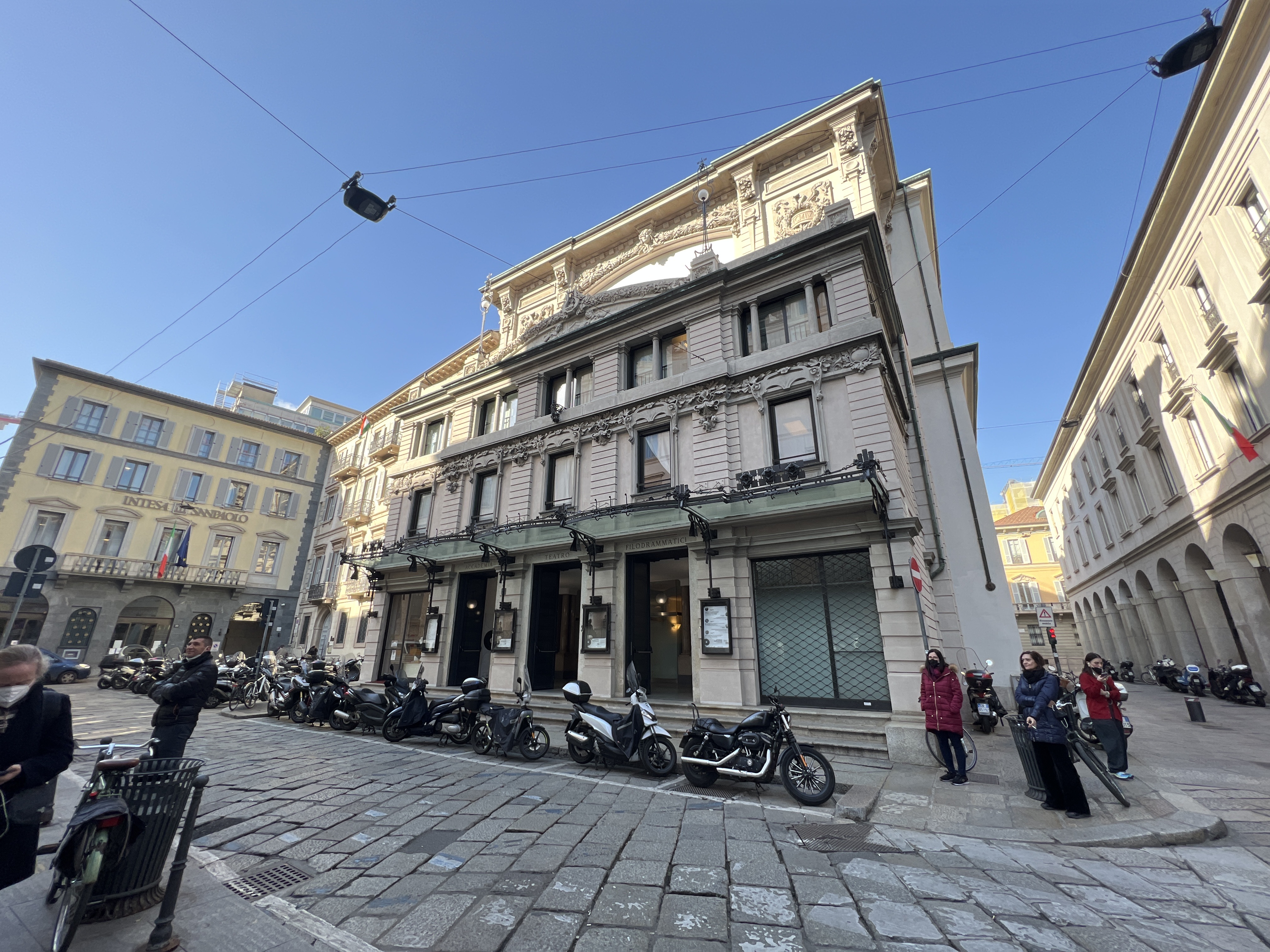
Accademia dei Filodrammatici

The Accademia dei Filodrammatici (literally "Academy of Drama Lovers"), is a drama school located in Milan, Italy and founded in 1796. It is the oldest theatre school in Italy.

The theatre was designed by neoclassic architect Luigi Canonica, based on Giuseppe Piermarini’s drawings. The original structure was replaced in 1904 with an Art Nouveau building by architects Laveni and Avati. Of that structure, only the façade was preserved, with stucco and iron decorations and floral weaving, typical of the time. The interior was completely rebuilt by the architect Luigi Caccia Dominioni in the 1960s, due to its partial destruction during Second World War bombings.

Tutors and staff members who worked at the school over the years include Vincenzo Monti, Carlo Porta, Ugo Foscolo, Cesare Beccaria, Giuseppe Giacosa and Giuseppe Verdi.
