= Liu Miaomiao (director) =

Chinese film director (born 1962)

- Born: 1962; Guyuan, Ningxia, China
- Occupation(s): Film and television director
- Years active: 1980s – present

Chinese name
- Traditional Chinese: 劉苗苗
- Simplified Chinese: 刘苗苗
Transcriptions
Standard Mandarin
- Hanyu Pinyin: Líu Miáomiáo

Liu Miaomiao (simplified Chinese: 刘苗苗; traditional Chinese: 劉苗苗; born 1962 in Guyuan, Ningxia) is a Chinese film director. Liu, a Hui Muslim, was the youngest member of the 1982 class of the Beijing Film Academy, commonly referred to as the Fifth Generation. Her career has spanned both film and television, though she remains less well known than many of her male counterparts to international audiences.

== Career ==
Liu graduated from the BFA's directing program, in which she enrolled at the age of sixteen, along with directors such as Tian Zhuangzhuang and Chen Kaige. Upon graduation, she was assigned to the Xiaoxing Film Studio where she directed her first solo work, Stories of the Voyage in 1985 at the age of 23.

In 1987, she directed the war film Women on the Long March, about eight female Red Army soldiers who find themselves separated from their main force during the Long March. In the early 1990s, Liu filmed two important works, 1993's Chatterbox, and 1994's Family Scandal (co-directed with Cui Xiaoqin). Both films garnered international notice, particularly the former, which won an award at the Venice International Film Festival. Chatterbox was a personal work as well, with Liu receiving no salary for the film and borrowing heavily to bring it to an international venue.

Liu Miaomiao has also shifted her career into filming television programs and films.

== Selected filmography ==
Year	English Title	Chinese Title	Notes
1985	Stories of the Voyage		Directorial debut
1987	Women on the Long March	马蹄声碎	
1988	The Boxer	拳击手	
1993	Chatterbox	杂嘴子	*Also known as An Innocent Babbler; *Winner of The President of the Italian Senate's Gold Medal at the Venice Film Festival
1994	Family Scandal	家丑	Co-directed with Cui Xiaoqin
