= Maurizio Nichetti =

Italian film screenwriter, actor, and director

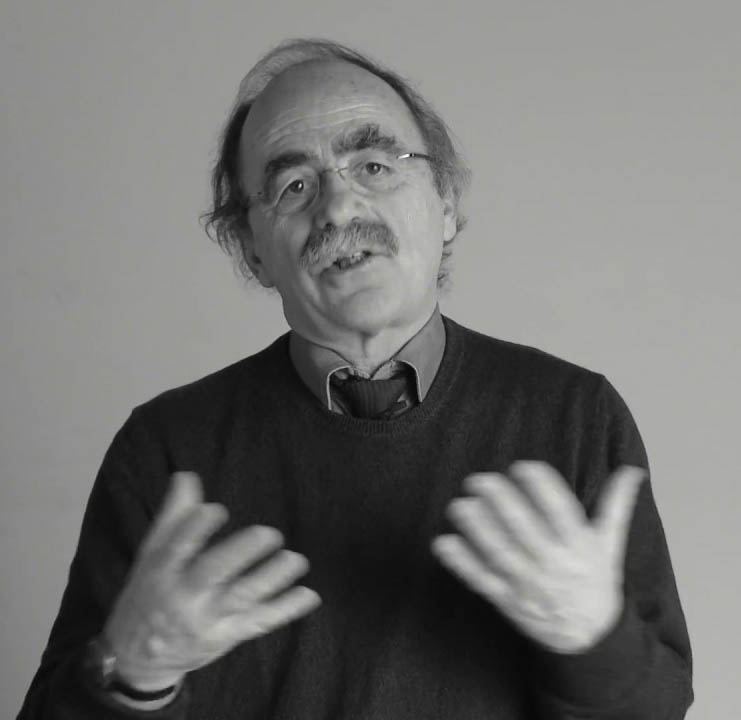
- Nichetti in 2016
- Born: 8 May 1948 (age 78); Milan, Italy
- Occupations: Film director; screenwriter; actor
- Years active: 1976–present
- Height: 1.61 m (5 ft 3 in)
- Awards: Nastro d'Argento for Best New Director (1997); Nastro d'Argento for Best Director (1997); U Giancu's Prize (2006)

Maurizio Nichetti (born 8 May 1948) is an Italian film director, screenwriter and actor.

== Life and career ==
Born in Milan, Nichetti graduated in architecture at the Polytechnic University of Milan. In 1971, after attending a mime course at the Piccolo Teatro, he became a collaborator of Bruno Bozzetto at his production company. In 1974, he founded a mime school, Quelli di Grok. After playing a major role in Bozzetto's Allegro non troppo, he made his directorial debut with the silent comedy film Ratataplan; the film premiered at the 36th Venice International Film Festival to critical acclaim, and was a surprise commercial success, marking Nichetti's breakout.

Nichetti's 1989 film The Icicle Thief won the Golden St. George at the 16th Moscow International Film Festival. It received international critical acclaim and got Nichetti a Nastro d'Argento for best original story. His following film, the mixture of animation and live action To Want to Fly, got him a David di Donatello for best screenplay. His 1996 film Luna e l'altra was nominated for a Golden Globe Award for Best Foreign Language Film, and got Nichetti a Silver Ribbon for Best Director. In 1998, he was a member of the jury at the 48th Berlin International Film Festival, and the following year he was a member of the jury at the 52nd Cannes Film Festival. Between 2004 and 2010, he was artistic director of the Trento Film Festival. He has also been active on stage and on television.

== Filmography ==
=== Film Director ===
- 1979 – Ratataplan
- 1980 – I Made a Splash
- 1983 – Tomorrow We Dance (Domani si balla!)
- 1986 – Il Bi e il Ba
- 1989 – The Icicle Thief (Ladri di saponette)
- 1991 – To Want to Fly (Volere volare)
- 1993 – Stefano Quantestorie
- 1995 – Snowball (Palla di neve)
- 1996 – Luna e l'altra
- 2001 – Honolulu Baby
- 2008 – Dottor Clown (TV)
- 2025 – AmicheMai

=== Actor ===
- 1976 – Allegro non troppo
- 1979 – Ratataplan
- 1982 – Tomorrow We Dance (Domani si balla!)
- 1983 – Hearts and Armour (I Paladini: Storia d'armi e d'amori)
- 1984 – Bertoldo, Bertoldino e Cacasenno
- 1989 – The Icicle Thief (Ladri di saponette)
- 1991 – To Want to Fly (Volere volare)
- 1993 – Stefano Quantestorie
- 1994 – Seven Sundays (Tous les jours dimanche)
- 1995 – Snowball (Palla di neve)
- 1996 – Luna e l'altra
- 2002 – Ciao America
- 2010 – Somewhere
- 2015 – Arrivano i prof
- 2021 – On Our Watch
